= Up to date (disambiguation) =

Up to Date is a studio album by The Partridge Family.

Up to date may also refer to:

- UpToDate, a company in the Health division of Wolters Kluwer
- Up to date, a sherry based cocktail
- Up to Date, a Japanese racehorse born in 2010
