= Nishino Daisy =

Japanese Thoroughbred racehorse (foaled 2016)

Nishino Daisy; ニシノデイジー
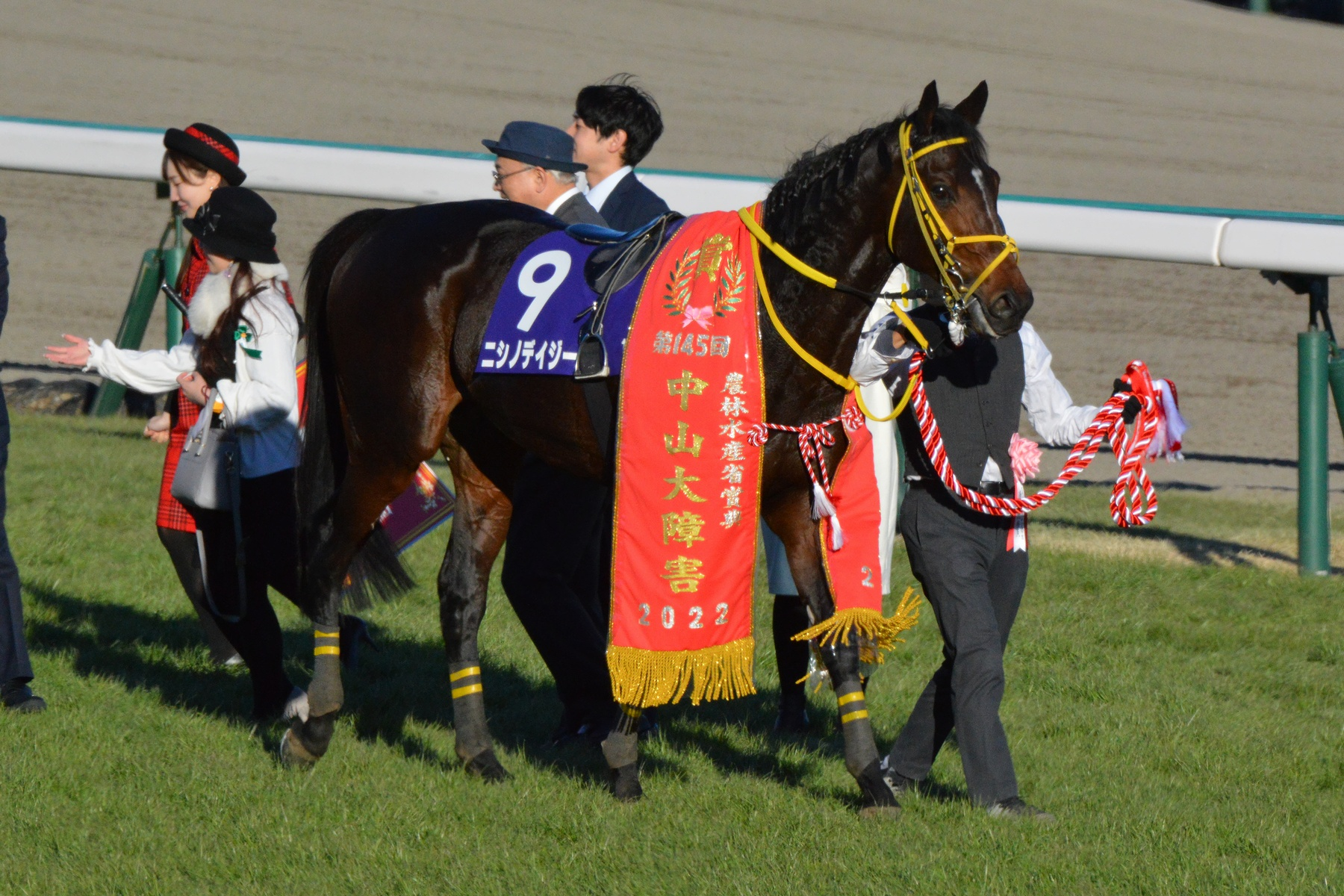
- Nishino Daisy after winning the 2022 Nakayama Daishogai
- Breed: Thoroughbred
- Sire: Harbinger
- Grandsire: Dansili
- Dam: Nishino Hinagiku
- Damsire: Agnes Tachyon
- Sex: Stallion
- Foaled: 18 April 2016 (age 10)
- Country: Japan
- Colour: Bay
- Breeder: Tanikawa Farm
- Owner: Shigeyuki Nishiyama
- Racing colours
- Trainer: Noboru Takagi
- Jockey: Masaki Katsuura; Yusuke Igarashi
- Record: 32: 6-3-4
- Earnings: ¥339,428,000

Major wins
- Nakayama Daishogai (2022, 2024); Sapporo Nisai Stakes (2018); Tokyo Sports Hai Nisai Stakes (2018)

Awards
- JRA Award for Best Steeplechase Horse (2024)

Nishino Daisy (Japanese: ニシノデイジー, Nishino Deijī; foaled 18 April 2016) is a Japanese Thoroughbred racehorse and sire. He competed from 2018 to 2024, recording six wins from thirty-two starts on both the flat and over jumps. On the flat, he won the Sapporo Nisai Stakes (GIII) and the Tokyo Sports Hai Nisai Stakes (GIII) in 2018. After switching to steeplechase racing in 2022, he won the Nakayama Daishogai (J-GI) in 2022 and 2024. His 2022 Nakayama Daishogai victory came in the retirement race of the champion Oju Chosan, and he became the second horse in JRA history to win a J-GI race after winning a flat graded stakes. He was named JRA Award for Best Steeplechase Horse in 2024.

== Background ==
Nishino Daisy is a bay stallion bred in Urakawa, Hokkaido, by Tanikawa Farm. He was sired by Harbinger, a British-bred stallion by Dansili, and his dam was Nishino Hinagiku (ニシノヒナギク), a mare by Agnes Tachyon. His third dam is Nishino Flower, winner of the 1992 Oka Shō and Sprinters Stakes, and his female line also carries the blood of Seiun Sky. He is owned by Shigeyuki Nishiyama, whose father Masayuki Nishiyama owned Seiun Sky and Nishino Flower, and was trained by Noboru Takagi at the JRA's Miho Training Center. His name combines the owner's prefix with "daisy" (雛菊), meaning "something wonderful" in reference to his dam.

== Racing career ==
=== 2018: two-year-old season ===
Nishino Daisy debuted on 8 July 2018 in a maiden race at Hakodate Racecourse, finishing second. He won his maiden on 21 July at Hakodate. On 1 September, he won the Sapporo Nisai Stakes (GIII) at 6th favourite. On 17 November, he won the Tokyo Sports Hai Nisai Stakes (GIII) at Tokyo Racecourse at 8th favourite in a four-horse photo finish. He finished third in the Hopeful Stakes (GI) at Nakayama Racecourse on 28 December.

=== 2019: three-year-old season ===
Nishino Daisy finished fourth in the Yayoi Sho (GII) on 3 March and seventeenth in the Satsuki Shō (GI) on 14 April. On 26 May, he finished fifth in the Tōkyō Yūshun (Japanese Derby) at odds of 107.9 (13th favourite). He finished fifth in the St. Lite Kinen (GII) on 16 September and ninth in the Kikuka Shō (GI) on 20 October, ridden by Christophe Lemaire.

=== 2020: four-year-old season ===
Nishino Daisy finished sixth in the American Jockey Club Cup (GII) on 26 January and sixth in the Kinkō Shō (GII) on 15 March. He struggled thereafter, finishing eighteenth in the Meguro Kinen (GII) on 31 May and thirteenth in the Hakodate Kinen (GIII) on 19 July.

=== 2021: five-year-old season ===
Nishino Daisy failed to place in his starts this year, finishing thirteenth in the Tokyo Shimbun Hai (GIII) on 7 February, twelfth in the Niigata Daishoten (GIII) on 9 May, and eighteenth in the Epsom Cup (GIII) on 13 June. He later finished eleventh in the Shimotsuki Stakes on 21 November and twelfth in the Betelgeuse Stakes on 28 December.

=== 2022: six-year-old season ===
After finishing twelfth in the Shirafuji Stakes in January, Nishino Daisy was switched to steeplechase racing. He finished third in his jump debut on 28 May at Niigata before winning his jump maiden on 19 June at Tokyo. He finished second in the Shuyo Jump Stakes on 19 November. On 24 December, he won the Nakayama Daishogai (J-GI) at 5th favourite, defeating the retiring Oju Chosan and recording his first J-GI victory in only his fourth jump start. In the JRA Award for Best Steeplechase Horse voting, he lost to Oju Chosan by a single vote (137–138).

=== 2023: seven-year-old season ===
Nishino Daisy finished third in the Hanshin Spring Jump (J-GII) on 11 March and ninth in the Nakayama Grand Jump (J-GI) on 15 April. He finished eleventh in the Tokyo High Jump (J-GII) on 15 October. On 23 December, he finished second in the Nakayama Daishogai (J-GI), beaten 1.8 seconds by Meiner Grand.

=== 2024: eight-year-old season ===
Nishino Daisy finished fourth in the Hanshin Spring Jump (J-GII) on 9 March and third in the Nakayama Grand Jump (J-GI) on 13 April. He finished fourth in the Tokyo High Jump (J-GII) on 13 October. On 21 December, he won the Nakayama Daishogai (J-GI) for the second time, defeating Ecoro Duel by 0.8 seconds. He was named JRA Award for Best Steeplechase Horse for 2024. He officially retired on 26 December 2024.

== Statistics ==
The following table details all 32 starts of Nishino Daisy's racing career. Record current as of 21 December 2024.

Date	Distance (Condition)	Race	Class	Course	Odds (Favourite)	Field	Finish	Time	Jockey	Winning (Losing) Margin	Winner (2nd Place)	Ref
2018 – two-year-old season (flat)
Jul 8	Turf 1800 m (Yielding)	2-Y-O Newcomer	Maiden	Hakodate	5.3 (2nd)	7	2nd	1:53.6	Masaki Katsuura	0.2	Love Me Fine	
Jul 21	Turf 1800 m (Good)	2-Y-O Maiden	Maiden	Hakodate	1.5 (1st)	12	1st	1:49.7	Masaki Katsuura	–0.2	(Tuareg)	
Sep 1	Turf 1800 m (Good)	Sapporo Nisai Stakes	GIII	Sapporo	28.2 (6th)	14	1st	1:50.1	Masaki Katsuura	–0.0	(Naimama)	
Nov 17	Turf 1800 m (Good)	Tokyo Sports Hai Nisai Stakes	GIII	Tokyo	38.4 (8th)	16	1st	1:46.6	Masaki Katsuura	–0.0	(Agaras)	
Dec 28	Turf 2000 m (Good)	Hopeful Stakes	GI	Nakayama	6.6 (3rd)	13	3rd	2:01.9	Masaki Katsuura	0.3	Saturnalia	
2019 – three-year-old season (flat)
Mar 3	Turf 2000 m (Heavy)	Yayoi Sho	GII	Nakayama	2.7 (1st)	10	4th	2:03.7	Masaki Katsuura	0.4	Meisho Tengen	
Apr 14	Turf 2000 m (Good)	Satsuki Shō	GI	Nakayama	30.2 (6th)	18	17th	2:00.1	Masaki Katsuura	2.0	Saturnalia	
May 26	Turf 2400 m (Good)	Tōkyō Yūshun	GI	Tokyo	107.9 (13th)	18	5th	2:23.1	Masaki Katsuura	0.5	Roger Barows	
Sep 16	Turf 2200 m (Heavy)	St. Lite Kinen	GII	Nakayama	5.8 (2nd)	18	5th	2:12.1	Masaki Katsuura	0.6	Lion Lion	
Oct 20	Turf 3000 m (Good)	Kikuka Shō	GI	Kyoto	6.0 (2nd)	18	9th	3:06.7	Christophe Lemaire	0.7	World Premiere	
2020 – four-year-old season (flat)
Jan 26	Turf 2200 m (Yielding)	American Jockey Club Cup	GII	Nakayama	8.2 (6th)	12	6th	2:16.1	Hironobu Tanabe	1.1	Blast Onepiece	
Mar 15	Turf 2000 m (Good)	Kinkō Shō	GII	Chukyo	20.6 (4th)	12	6th	2:02.3	Hironobu Tanabe	0.7	Saturnalia	
May 31	Turf 2500 m (Good)	Meguro Kinen	GII	Tokyo	19.2 (9th)	18	18th	2:31.9	Hironobu Tanabe	2.3	King of Koji	
Jul 19	Turf 2000 m (Good)	Hakodate Kinen	GIII	Hakodate	10.3 (6th)	16	13th	2:01.4	Masaki Katsuura	1.7	Admire Justa	
2021 – five-year-old season (flat)
Feb 7	Turf 1600 m (Good)	Tokyo Shimbun Hai	GIII	Tokyo	68.7 (13th)	16	13th	1:33.5	Masaki Katsuura	1.1	Karate	
May 9	Turf 2000 m (Good)	Niigata Daishoten	GIII	Niigata	64.4 (12th)	14	12th	2:01.4	Masaki Katsuura	2.1	Sanrei Pocket	
Jun 13	Turf 1800 m (Good)	Epsom Cup	GIII	Tokyo	92.9 (16th)	18	18th	1:47.0	Teruo Eda	1.9	Zadar	
Nov 21	Dirt 1400 m (Good)	Shimotsuki Stakes	Open	Tokyo	66.3 (14th)	16	11th	1:24.7	Hiroyuki Uchida	1.0	Helios	
Dec 28	Dirt 1800 m (Good)	Betelgeuse Stakes	Listed	Hanshin	87.1 (16th)	16	12th	1:53.5	Fuma Matsuwaka	1.8	Iolite	
2022 – six-year-old season (flat / jump)
Jan 29	Turf 2000 m (Good)	Shirafuji Stakes	Listed	Tokyo	236.3 (13th)	14	12th	1:58.6	Genki Maruyama	1.2	Jack d'Or	
May 28	Jump 2890 m (Yielding)	Jump 4-Y-O+ Maiden	Maiden	Niigata	7.4 (5th)	14	3rd	3:12.0	Yusuke Igarashi	0.5	Be My Ocean	
Jun 19	Jump 3000 m (Good)	Jump 3-Y-O+ Maiden	Maiden	Tokyo	1.7 (1st)	11	1st	3:23.1	Yusuke Igarashi	–0.5	(Fervore)	
Nov 19	Jump 3110 m (Good)	Shuyo Jump Stakes	Open	Tokyo	2.6 (1st)	14	2nd	3:27.4	Yusuke Igarashi	0.1	Kouyu Nureyev	
Dec 24	Jump 4100 m (Good)	Nakayama Daishogai	J-GI	Nakayama	15.4 (5th)	11	1st	4:45.9	Yusuke Igarashi	–0.5	(Xenoverse)	
2023 – seven-year-old season (jump)
Mar 11	Jump 3900 m (Good)	Hanshin Spring Jump	J-GII	Hanshin	2.2 (1st)	12	3rd	4:23.0	Shinichi Ishigami	1.4	Gemini King	
Apr 15	Jump 4250 m (Heavy)	Nakayama Grand Jump	J-GI	Nakayama	1.8 (1st)	10	9th	5:00.2	Shinichi Ishigami	6.1	Irogotoshi	
Oct 15	Jump 3110 m (Heavy)	Tokyo High Jump	J-GII	Tokyo	5.6 (3rd)	12	11th	3:37.0	Yusuke Igarashi	5.0	Meiner Grand	
Dec 23	Jump 4100 m (Good)	Nakayama Daishogai	J-GI	Nakayama	6.6 (3rd)	12	2nd	4:39.6	Yusuke Igarashi	1.8	Meiner Grand	
2024 – eight-year-old season (jump)
Mar 9	Jump 3900 m (Good)	Hanshin Spring Jump	J-GII	Hanshin	10.3 (3rd)	10	4th	4:26.4	Yusuke Igarashi	2.5	Meiner Grand	
Apr 13	Jump 4250 m (Good)	Nakayama Grand Jump	J-GI	Nakayama	14.2 (3rd)	12	3rd	4:48.1	Yusuke Igarashi	0.6	Irogotoshi	
Oct 13	Jump 3110 m (Good)	Tokyo High Jump	J-GII	Tokyo	6.5 (2nd)	9	4th	3:26.0	Yusuke Igarashi	0.8	June Velocity	
Dec 21	Jump 4100 m (Good)	Nakayama Daishogai	J-GI	Nakayama	6.0 (4th)	9	1st	4:40.4	Yusuke Igarashi	–0.8	(Ecoro Duel)	

== Stud career ==
Nishino Daisy entered stud at Hakuba Farm in Niikappu, Hokkaido, in 2025.

== Pedigree ==
Pedigree of Nishino Daisy (JPN)
Sire Harbinger (GB) 2006	Dansili (GB); 1996	Danehill	Danzig
Sire Harbinger (GB) 2006	Dansili (GB); 1996	Danehill	Razyana
Sire Harbinger (GB) 2006	Dansili (GB); 1996	Hasili	Kahyasi
Sire Harbinger (GB) 2006	Dansili (GB); 1996	Hasili	Kerali
Sire Harbinger (GB) 2006	Penang Pearl (FR); 1996	Bering	Arctic Tern
Sire Harbinger (GB) 2006	Penang Pearl (FR); 1996	Bering	Beaune
Sire Harbinger (GB) 2006	Penang Pearl (FR); 1996	Guapa	Shareef Dancer
Sire Harbinger (GB) 2006	Penang Pearl (FR); 1996	Guapa	Sauceboat
Dam Nishino Hinagiku (JPN) 2008	Agnes Tachyon (JPN); 1998	Sunday Silence	Halo
Dam Nishino Hinagiku (JPN) 2008	Agnes Tachyon (JPN); 1998	Sunday Silence	Wishing Well
Dam Nishino Hinagiku (JPN) 2008	Agnes Tachyon (JPN); 1998	Agnes Flora	Royal Ski
Dam Nishino Hinagiku (JPN) 2008	Agnes Tachyon (JPN); 1998	Agnes Flora	Agnes Lady
Dam Nishino Hinagiku (JPN) 2008	Nishino Mirai (JPN); 2003	Seiun Sky	Sheriff's Star
Dam Nishino Hinagiku (JPN) 2008	Nishino Mirai (JPN); 2003	Seiun Sky	Sister Mill
Dam Nishino Hinagiku (JPN) 2008	Nishino Mirai (JPN); 2003	Nishino Flower	Majestic Light
Dam Nishino Hinagiku (JPN) 2008	Nishino Mirai (JPN); 2003	Nishino Flower	Duplicit

- Nishino Daisy is inbred 4 × 5 to Danzig and 5 × 5 to Northern Dancer (sire side).
- His third dam Nishino Flower won the 1992 Oka Shō and Sprinters Stakes.
- His female line belongs to the Somethingroyal family, which also produced Secretariat and Lord Kanaloa.
