= Ecoro Duel =

Japanese Thoroughbred racehorse (foaled 2019)

Ecoro Duel; エコロデュエル
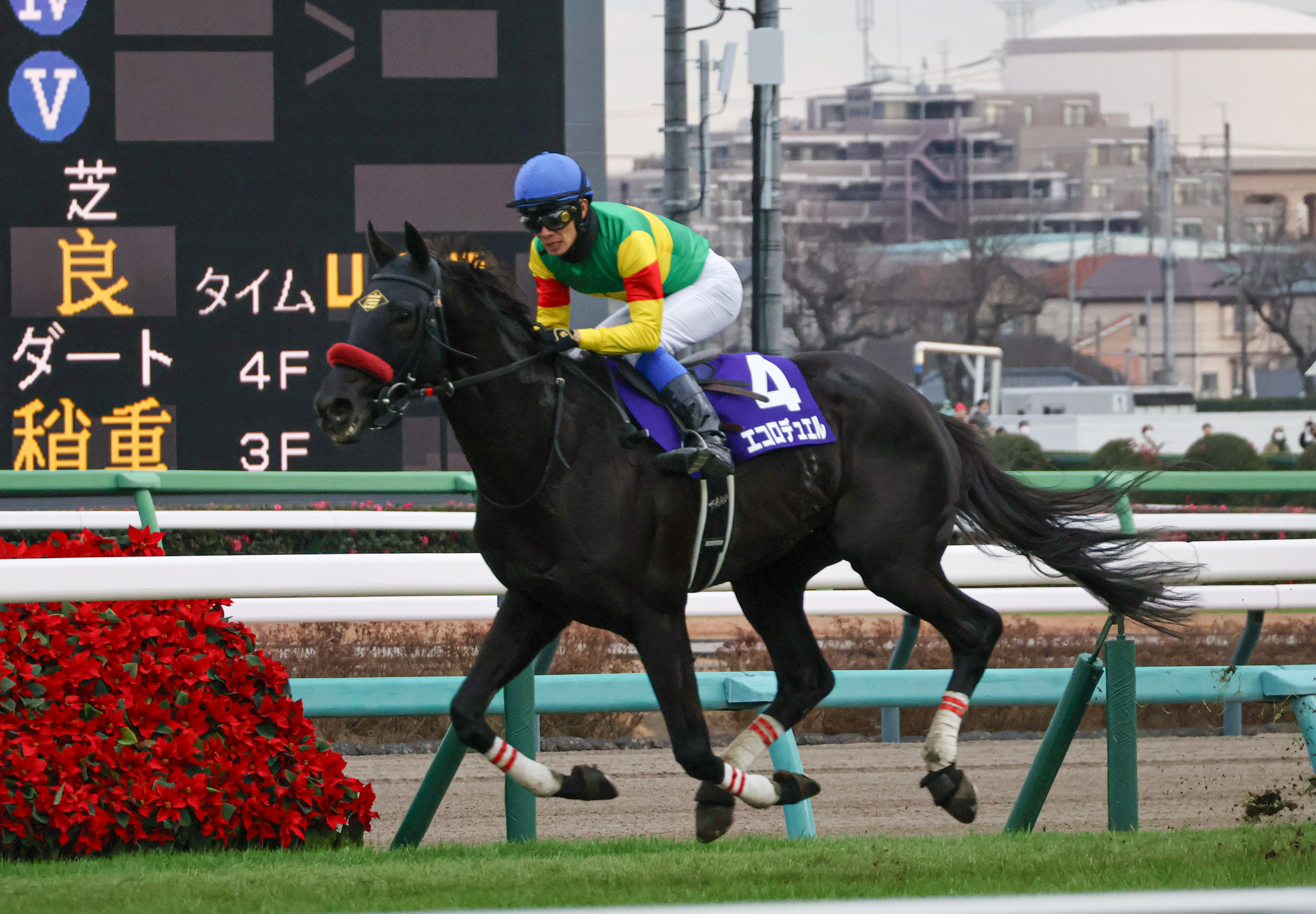
- Ecoro Duel at the 2025 Nakayama Daishogai
- Breed: Thoroughbred
- Sire: Kitasan Black
- Grandsire: Black Tide
- Dam: Clarinet
- Damsire: Giant's Causeway
- Sex: Stallion
- Foaled: 4 May 2019
- Country: Japan
- Colour: Dark bay
- Breeder: Shimokobe Farm
- Owner: Masatoshi Haramura
- Racing colours
- Trainer: Makoto Saito; Takaki Iwato
- Jockey: Taro Kusano
- Record: 27: 7-6-3 (10 flat: 1-1-1; 17 jump: 6-5-2)
- Earnings: ¥412,296,000

Major wins
- Nakayama Grand Jump (2025, 2026); Nakayama Daishogai (2025); Kyoto Jump Stakes (2023)

Awards
- JRA Award for Best Steeplechase Horse (2025)

Ecoro Duel (Japanese: エコロデュエル, Ecoro Duel; foaled 4 May 2019) is a Japanese Thoroughbred steeplechase racehorse. He has competed since 2022, recording seven wins from twenty-six starts, including the Nakayama Grand Jump (J-GI) in 2025 and 2026, the Nakayama Daishogai (J-GI) in 2025, and the Kyoto Jump Stakes (J-GIII) in 2023. He is the third horse in JRA history to win three J-GI steeplechase races. He was named Best Steeplechase Horse at the 2025 JRA Awards. His racing name combines "Ecoro," the owner's prefix, with "Duel" (決闘).

== Background ==
Ecoro Duel is a dark bay stallion bred in Hidaka, Hokkaido, by Shimokobe Farm. He was sired by Kitasan Black, a son of Black Tide, and his dam was Clarinet, an American-bred mare by Giant's Causeway. He is owned by Masanori Hara and was initially trained by Makoto Saito at the Miho Training Center before being transferred to Takaki Iwato.

== Racing career ==
=== 2022: three-year-old season ===
Ecoro Duel debuted on 23 January 2022 in a maiden race on the turf at Kokura Racecourse, finishing seventh. He finished unplaced in three subsequent maiden races before winning his fifth start at Tokyo Racecourse on 5 June. He did not win again on the flat, finishing the season with one win from ten starts.

=== 2023: four-year-old season ===
Ecoro Duel was switched to steeplechase racing in May 2023. He finished seventh in his first jump race at Niigata Racecourse on 7 May, then won a jump maiden race at Kyoto Racecourse on 28 May by 2.2 seconds. He won a jump open race at Chukyo Racecourse on 22 July. He finished tenth in the Hanshin Jump Stakes (J-GIII) on 16 September. On 11 November, he won the Kyoto Jump Stakes (J-GIII) at Kyoto, defeating Asakusa Genki by 0.1 seconds. He finished third in the Nakayama Daishogai (J-GI) on 23 December.

=== 2024: five-year-old season ===
Ecoro Duel finished second in the Hanshin Spring Jump (J-GII) on 9 March and fourth in the Nakayama Grand Jump (J-GI) on 13 April. He finished second in the Tokyo High Jump (J-GII) on 13 October and second in the Nakayama Daishogai (J-GI) on 21 December.

=== 2025: six-year-old season ===
Ecoro Duel finished fourth in the Hanshin Spring Jump (J-GII) on 15 March. On 19 April, he won the Nakayama Grand Jump (J-GI) at Nakayama Racecourse in a race-record time of 4:50.5, recording his first J-GI victory. After a break, he finished second in the Tokyo High Jump (J-GII) on 19 October. On 27 December, he won the Nakayama Daishogai (J-GI) at Nakayama as the 1.5 favourite, recording his second J-GI victory.

=== 2026: seven-year-old season ===
Ecoro Duel finished second in the Hanshin Spring Jump (J-GII) on 14 March. On 18 April, he won the Nakayama Grand Jump (J-GI) at Nakayama in a race-record time of 4:49.0, defeating Dinasta by 2.0 seconds and recording his third consecutive J-GI victory. He is the third horse in JRA history to win three J-GI steeplechase races, and the fifth to win the Nakayama Grand Jump in consecutive years. Ecoro Duel made his comeback in the autumn session at the Tokyo High Jump (J-GII) in October, in which he finished in third place seven lengths behind the winner, June Velocity.

== Statistics ==
Record current as of 18 October 2026.

Date	Distance (Condition)	Race	Class	Course	Odds (Favourite)	Field	Finish	Time	Jockey	Winning (Losing) Margin	Winner (2nd Place)	Ref
2022 – three-year-old season (flat)
Jan 23	Turf 1800 m (Heavy)	3-Y-O Newcomer	Maiden	Kokura	42.9 (11th)	16	7th	1:53.6	Akatsuki Tomita	1.7	Tsutchi Faith	
Feb 5	Turf 2000 m (Good)	3-Y-O Maiden	Maiden	Kokura	80.7 (11th)	14	11th	2:03.4	Akatsuki Tomita	1.4	Licancabur	
Apr 24	Turf 1800 m (Good)	3-Y-O Maiden	Maiden	Tokyo	42.8 (7th)	17	7th	1:48.5	Yukito Ishikawa	1.2	Spider Gold	
May 15	Turf 2000 m (Good)	3-Y-O Maiden	Maiden	Tokyo	117.7 (9th)	11	2nd	2:01.0	Yukito Ishikawa	0.0	Simon Baron	
Jun 5	Turf 2000 m (Good)	3-Y-O Maiden	Maiden	Tokyo	3.7 (2nd)	10	1st	2:01.9	Yukito Ishikawa	0.0	(High Esteem)	
Jun 19	Turf 2000 m (Good)	3-Y-O+ 1-Win	Allowance	Tokyo	28.1 (5th)	9	5th	1:59.5	Yukito Ishikawa	1.5	Parallel Vision	
Sep 3	Turf 2200 m (Good)	Hyoko Tokubetsu	Allowance	Niigata	17.1 (5th)	12	5th	2:14.9	Yukito Ishikawa	0.8	Justin Ver	
Sep 17	Turf 2000 m (Good)	3-Y-O+ 1-Win	Allowance	Nakayama	19.9 (8th)	12	11th	2:01.8	Arata Saito	2.1	Success Shoot	
Nov 12	Turf 1800 m (Good)	3-Y-O+ 1-Win	Allowance	Tokyo	117.1 (14th)	15	14th	1:47.9	Yukito Ishikawa	1.4	Seraphinite	
Nov 26	Turf 2400 m (Good)	3-Y-O+ 1-Win	Allowance	Tokyo	35.7 (6th)	7	3rd	2:27.0	Ryuto Yokoyama	0.9	Struve	
2023 – four-year-old season (jump)
May 7	Jump 2890 m (Soft)	Jump 4-Y-O+ Maiden	Maiden	Niigata	13.3 (7th)	8	7th	3:20.5	Taro Kusano	1.4	Shonan Baldi	
May 28	Jump 2910 m (Good)	Jump 4-Y-O+ Maiden	Maiden	Kyoto	10.1 (4th)	9	1st	3:14.5	Taro Kusano	–2.2	(Grand Shark)	
Jul 22	Jump 3330 m (Good)	Jump 3-Y-O+ Open	Open	Chukyo	2.9 (1st)	9	1st	3:42.3	Taro Kusano	–0.5	(Hoshi Lumiere)	
Sep 16	Jump 3140 m (Good)	Hanshin Jump Stakes	J-GIII	Hanshin	6.2 (2nd)	14	10th	3:31.7	Taro Kusano	6.0	June Velocity	
Nov 11	Jump 3170 m (Yielding)	Kyoto Jump Stakes	J-GIII	Kyoto	6.5 (4th)	12	1st	3:38.7	Taro Kusano	–0.1	(Asakusa Genki)	
Dec 23	Jump 4100 m (Good)	Nakayama Daishogai	J-GI	Nakayama	9.6 (4th)	12	3rd	4:40.9	Taro Kusano	2.8	Meiner Grand	
2024 – five-year-old season (jump)
Mar 9	Jump 3900 m (Good)	Hanshin Spring Jump	J-GII	Hanshin	16.7 (5th)	10	2nd	4:25.1	Taro Kusano	1.2	Meiner Grand	
Apr 13	Jump 4250 m (Good)	Nakayama Grand Jump	J-GI	Nakayama	14.7 (4th)	12	4th	4:48.6	Yuta Onodera	1.6	Irogotoshi	
Oct 13	Jump 3110 m (Good)	Tokyo High Jump	J-GII	Tokyo	6.9 (3rd)	9	2nd	3:25.1	Taro Kusano	0.3	June Velocity	
Dec 21	Jump 4100 m (Good)	Nakayama Daishogai	J-GI	Nakayama	5.9 (3rd)	9	2nd	4:41.2	Taro Kusano	0.8	Nishino Daisy	
2025 – six-year-old season (jump)
Mar 15	Jump 3900 m (Good)	Hanshin Spring Jump	J-GII	Hanshin	2.3 (1st)	8	4th	4:32.6	Taro Kusano	0.9	Veil Nebula	
Apr 19	Jump 4260 m (Good)	Nakayama Grand Jump	J-GI	Nakayama	6.2 (5th)	12	1st	R4:50.5	Taro Kusano	–1.3	(Neviim)	
Oct 19	Jump 3110 m (Good)	Tokyo High Jump	J-GII	Tokyo	3.1 (2nd)	10	2nd	3:26.8	Taro Kusano	0.0	June Velocity	
Dec 27	Jump 4100 m (Good)	Nakayama Daishogai	J-GI	Nakayama	1.5 (1st)	10	1st	4:46.8	Taro Kusano	–0.8	(Neviim)	
2026 – seven-year-old season (jump)
Mar 14	Jump 3900 m (Good)	Hanshin Spring Jump	J-GII	Hanshin	1.5 (1st)	10	2nd	4:30.7	Taro Kusano	0.0	Dinasta	
Apr 18	Jump 4260 m (Good)	Nakayama Grand Jump	J-GI	Nakayama	1.5 (1st)	10	1st	R4:49.0	Taro Kusano	–2.0	(Dinasta)	
Oct 18	Jump 3110 m (Good)	Tokyo High Jump	J-GII	Tokyo	1.7 (1st)	9	3rd	3:24.4	Taro Kusano	1.2	June Velocity	

== Pedigree ==
Pedigree of Ecoro Duel (JPN), dark bay stallion, 2019
Sire Kitasan Black (JPN) 2012	Black Tide (JPN); 2001	Sunday Silence	Halo
Sire Kitasan Black (JPN) 2012	Black Tide (JPN); 2001	Sunday Silence	Wishing Well
Sire Kitasan Black (JPN) 2012	Black Tide (JPN); 2001	Wind in Her Hair	Alzao
Sire Kitasan Black (JPN) 2012	Black Tide (JPN); 2001	Wind in Her Hair	Burghclere
Sire Kitasan Black (JPN) 2012	Sugar Heart (JPN); 2005	Sakura Bakushin O	Sakura Yutaka O
Sire Kitasan Black (JPN) 2012	Sugar Heart (JPN); 2005	Sakura Bakushin O	Sakura Hagoromo
Sire Kitasan Black (JPN) 2012	Sugar Heart (JPN); 2005	Otomegokoro	Judge Angelucci
Sire Kitasan Black (JPN) 2012	Sugar Heart (JPN); 2005	Otomegokoro	Tizly
Dam Clarinet (USA) 2007	Giant's Causeway (USA); 1997	Storm Cat	Storm Bird
Dam Clarinet (USA) 2007	Giant's Causeway (USA); 1997	Storm Cat	Terlingua
Dam Clarinet (USA) 2007	Giant's Causeway (USA); 1997	Mariah's Storm	Rahy
Dam Clarinet (USA) 2007	Giant's Causeway (USA); 1997	Mariah's Storm	Immense
Dam Clarinet (USA) 2007	Legs Lawlor (USA); 2002	Unbridled	Fappiano
Dam Clarinet (USA) 2007	Legs Lawlor (USA); 2002	Unbridled	Gana Facil
Dam Clarinet (USA) 2007	Legs Lawlor (USA); 2002	Evil Elaine	Medieval Man
Dam Clarinet (USA) 2007	Legs Lawlor (USA); 2002	Evil Elaine	Distinctive Elaine

- Ecoro Duel is inbred 5 × 5 to Lyphard (sire side).
- His sire Kitasan Black won the 2016 Kikuka Shō and 2017 Tennō Shō (Spring).
- His dam Clarinet was imported from the United States.

== See also ==
- Thoroughbred racing in Japan
- Nakayama Grand Jump
- Nakayama Daishogai
