= Harbinger (horse) =

British-bred Thoroughbred racehorse

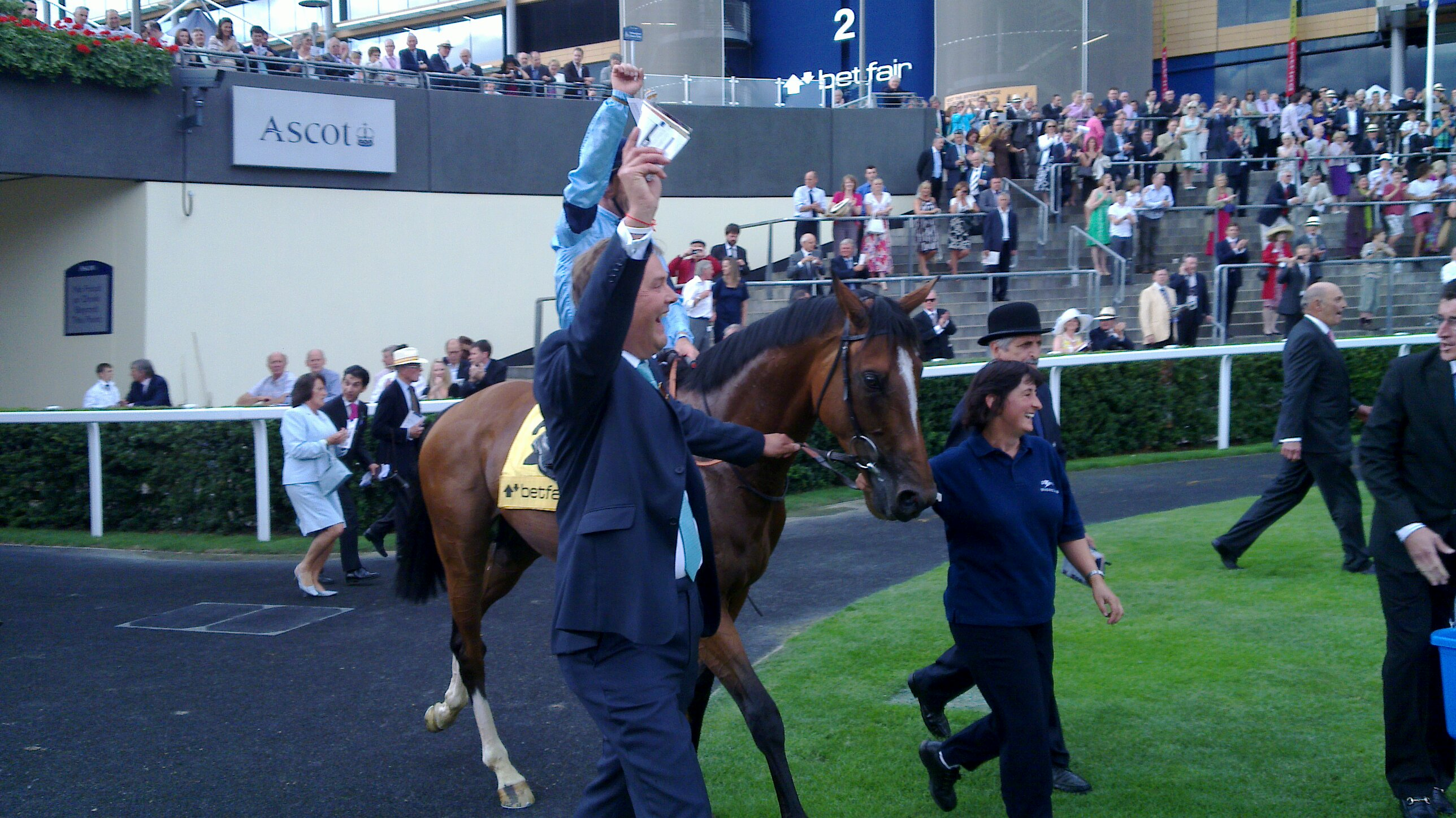
- Harbinger ridden by Olivier Peslier led in by Harry Herbert after winning King George VI & Queen Elizabeth Stakes.
- Sire: Dansili
- Grandsire: Danehill
- Dam: Penang Pearl
- Damsire: Bering
- Sex: Stallion
- Foaled: 12 March 2006
- Country: Great Britain
- Colour: Bay
- Breeder: Mrs. A.K.H. Ooi
- Owner: Highclere Thoroughbred Racing (Adm. Rous)
- Trainer: Sir Michael Stoute
- Record: 9: 6-1-1
- Earnings: £765,003

Major wins
- Gordon Stakes (2009); John Porter Stakes (2010); Ormonde Stakes (2010); Hardwicke Stakes (2010); King George VI and Queen Elizabeth Stakes (2010)

Honours
- 1st in World Thoroughbred Rankings (2010); Timeform rating: 140
- Last updated on 22 Nov 2026

Harbinger (foaled 12 March 2006) is a retired British Thoroughbred racehorse best known for winning the King George VI and Queen Elizabeth Stakes in 2010.

== Background ==
Harbinger is a bay horse with a white blaze and white socks on his hind legs. He was sold at yearling auction for 180,000 guineas and entered into the ownership of the Admiral Rous group, one of several syndicates operated by Highclere Throroughbred Racing. Harbinger was trained by Sir Michael Stoute at his Freemason Lodge stable in Newmarket, Suffolk.

== Racing career ==
His first season of racing was as a three-year-old in 2009, where he won two of his five starts including the Gordon Stakes at Goodwood. He returned as a four-year-old with a win in the John Porter Stakes, which was followed by wins in the Ormonde Stakes and Hardwicke Stakes.

Those performances saw him start second favourite in the King George behind his stable companion Workforce, the winner of the 2010 Epsom Derby. Ryan Moore, who had ridden Harbinger in all his previous races, elected to ride Workforce, with the ride on the second favourite being taken by the French jockey Olivier Peslier. However, Harbinger proved to be far too good in the King George, winning by 11 lengths over a field which also included Irish Derby winner Cape Blanco, triple Prix de l'Arc de Triomphe runner-up Youmzain and Hong Kong Vase winner Daryakana. The time was a track record, beating the previous race record set by Grundy in 1975, albeit at the old Ascot track. He was then made a short-priced favourite for the Prix de l'Arc de Triomphe and officially rated the best flat horse in the world.

Before running in the Prix de l'Arc de Triomphe, Harbinger prepared to run in the International Stakes. Harbinger suffered a leg fracture while on the gallops at Sir Michael Stoute's yard. He was subsequently retired from racing.

== Stud record ==
Harbinger was retired in 2011 to the Shadai Stallion Station in Japan. In the autumn of 2017, he had his first Grade 1 winners when his three-year-old daughters Deirdre and Mozu Katchan won the Shūka Shō and the Queen Elizabeth II Cup respectively before the colt Persian Knight took the Mile Championship. His fourth Grade 1 followed in 2018 when Blast Onepiece won the Arima Kinen. Deirdre gave Harbinger a European Group 1 win in August 2019 when taking the Nassau Stakes. Normcore won the Victoria Mile in 2019 and the Hong Kong Cup in 2020.

In addition, Harbinger is also the damsire of Regaleira (Hopeful Stakes, Arima Kinen, Queen Elizabeth II Cup), Urban Chic (Kikuka-shō) and Meikei Yell.

=== Major winners ===
c = colt, f = filly, g = gelding
Bold = Grade 1 stakes

Grade One winners
Foaled	Name	Sex	Major Wins
2014	Deirdre	f	Shion Stakes, **Shūka Shō**, Queen Stakes, Fuchu Himba Stakes, **Nassau Stakes**
2014	Mozu Katchan	f	Flora Stakes, **Queen Elizabeth II Cup**
2014	Persian Knight	c	Arlington Cup, **Mile Championship**
2015	Blast Onepiece	c	Mainichi Hai, Niigata Kinen, **Arima Kinen**, Sapporo Kinen, American Jockey Club Cup
2015	Normcore	f	Shion Stakes, **Victoria Mile**, Fuji Stakes, Sapporo Kinen, **Hong Kong Cup**
2016	Nishino Daisy	c	Sapporo Nisai Stakes, Tokyo Sports Hai Nisai Stakes, **Nakayama Daishogai** (twice)
2019	Namur	f	Tulip Sho, Fuji Stakes, **Mile Championship**
2021	Cervinia	f	Artemis Stakes, **Yushun Himba**, **Shūka Shō**
2022	Arma Veloce	f	**Hanshin Juvenile Fillies**

Other winners
Foaled	Name	Sex	Major Wins
2012	Beruf	c	Keisei Hai
2013	Dreadnoughtus	g	Kyoto Nisai Stakes, Kyōto Daishōten
2013	He's in Love	c	Lord Derby Challenge Trophy
2013	Prophet	g	Keisei Hai
2013	Yokagura	g	Kokura Summer Jump
2015	Harbin Mao	f	Kanto Oaks
2015	K T Clever	c	Tokyo Jump Stakes
2016	Figlia Pura	f	Fairy Stakes
2016	Happy Hour	c	Falcon Stakes
2016	Hindu Times	g	Kokura Daishoten
2016	Summer Scent	f	Mermaid Stakes
2019	Gran Dia	g	Niigata Daishoten
2019	Presage Lift	f	Queen Cup
2019	Rousham Park	c	Hakodate Kinen, Sankei Sho All Comers
2020	Emu	f	Flower Cup
2020	Phantom Thief	c	Kyodo Tsushin Hai
2020	Suzuka Harbin	c	Tokyo Jump Stakes
2023	Shonan Gulf	c	Sapporo Nisai Stakes

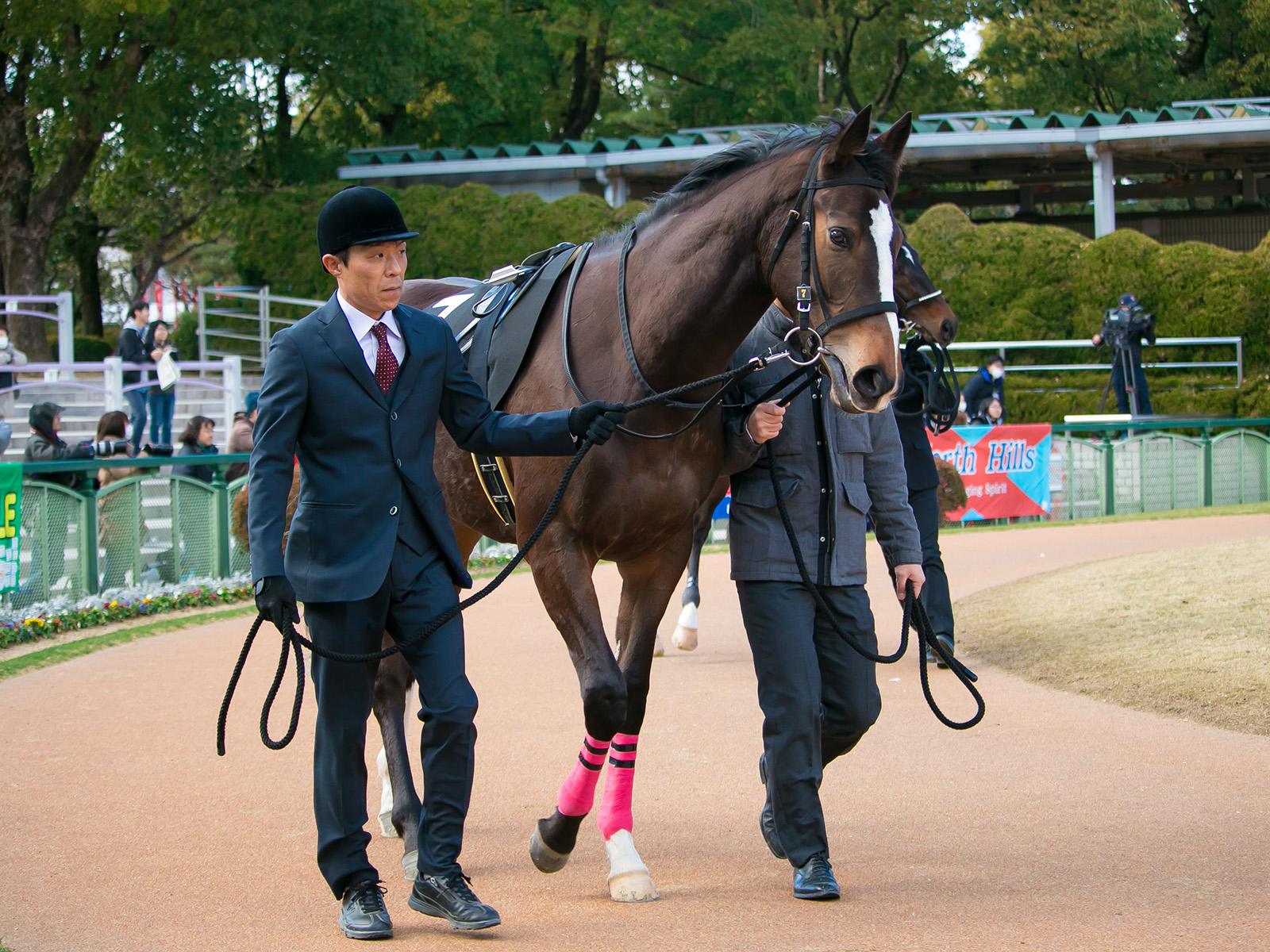
Deirdre

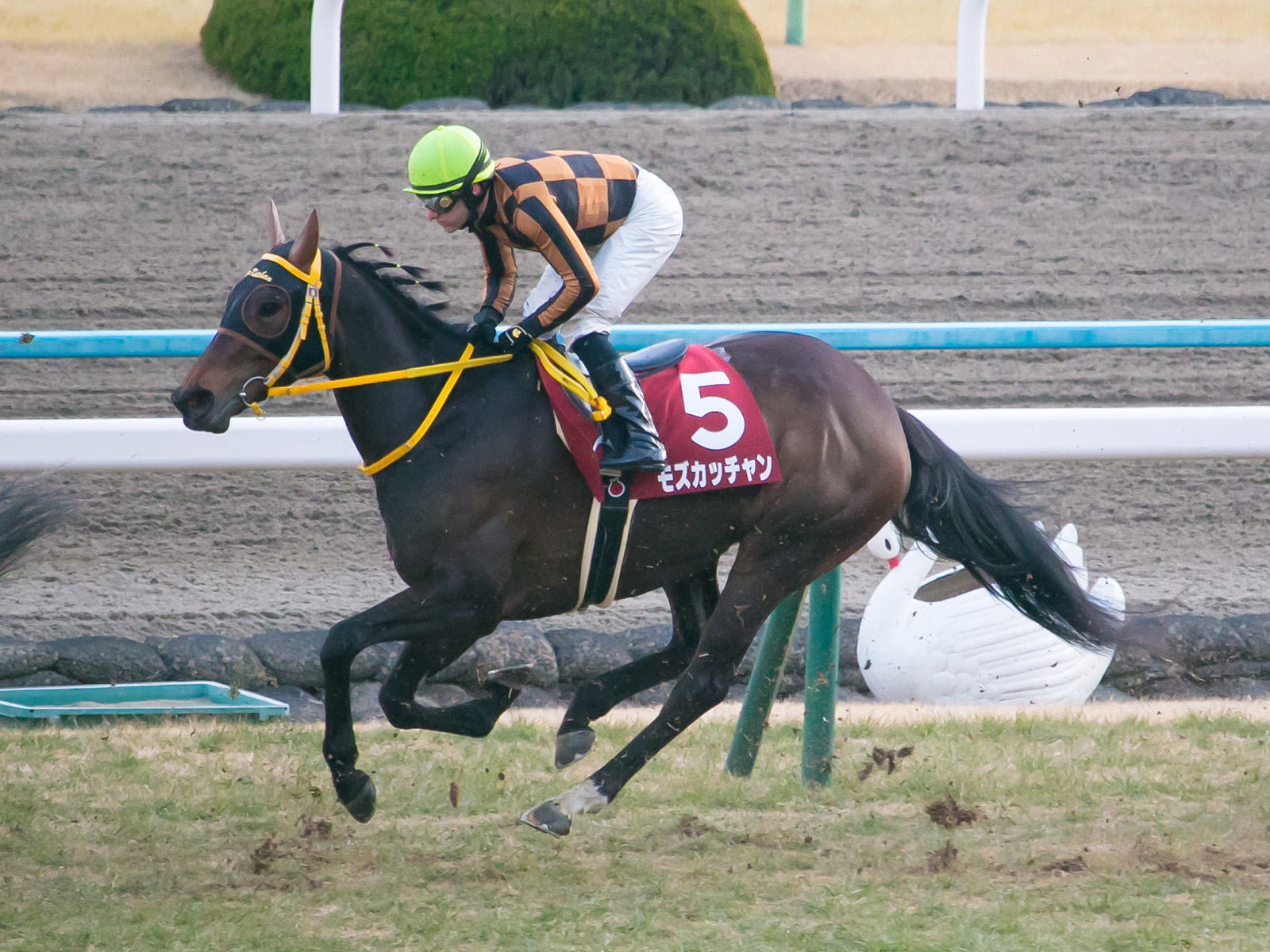
Mozu Katchan

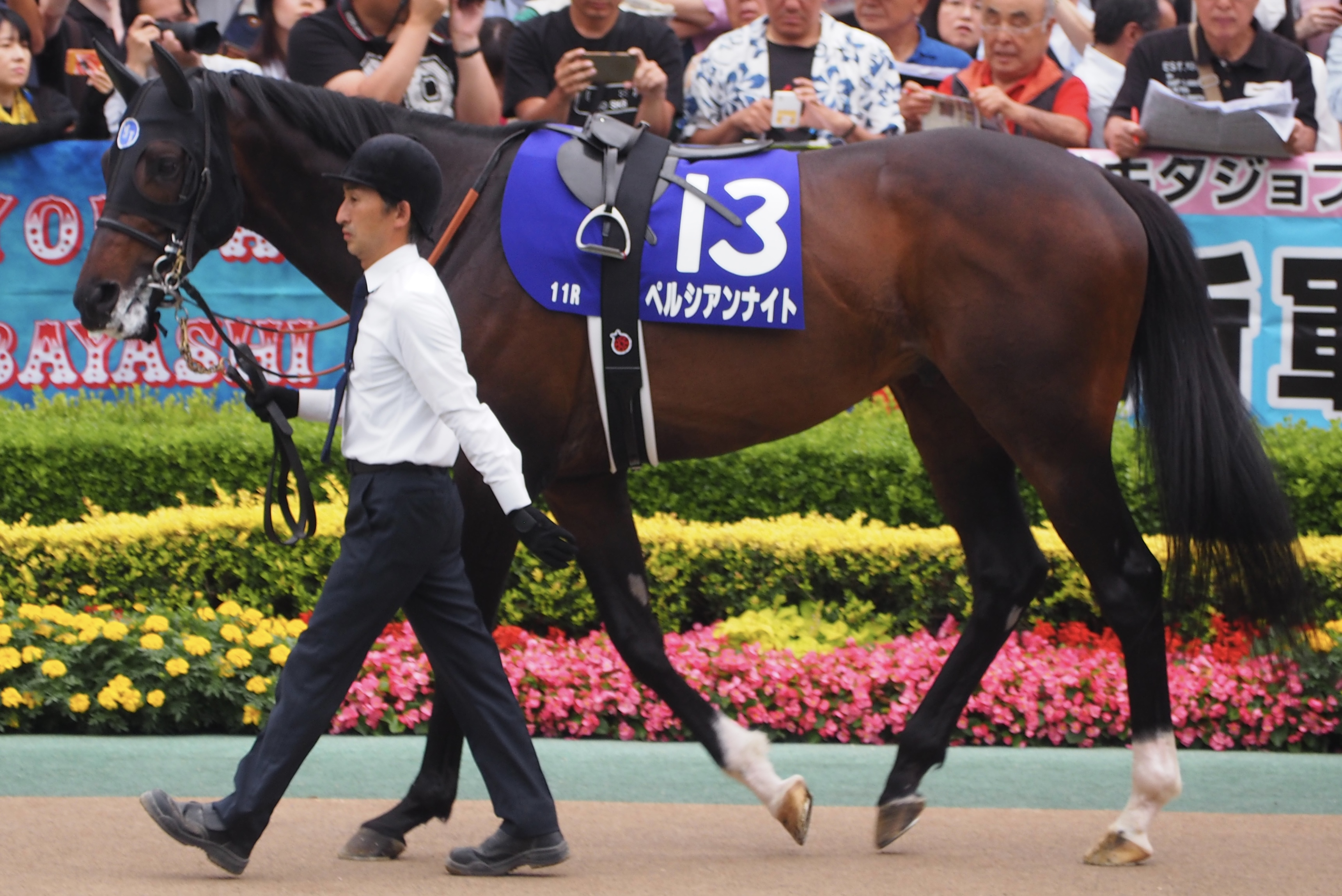
Persian Knight

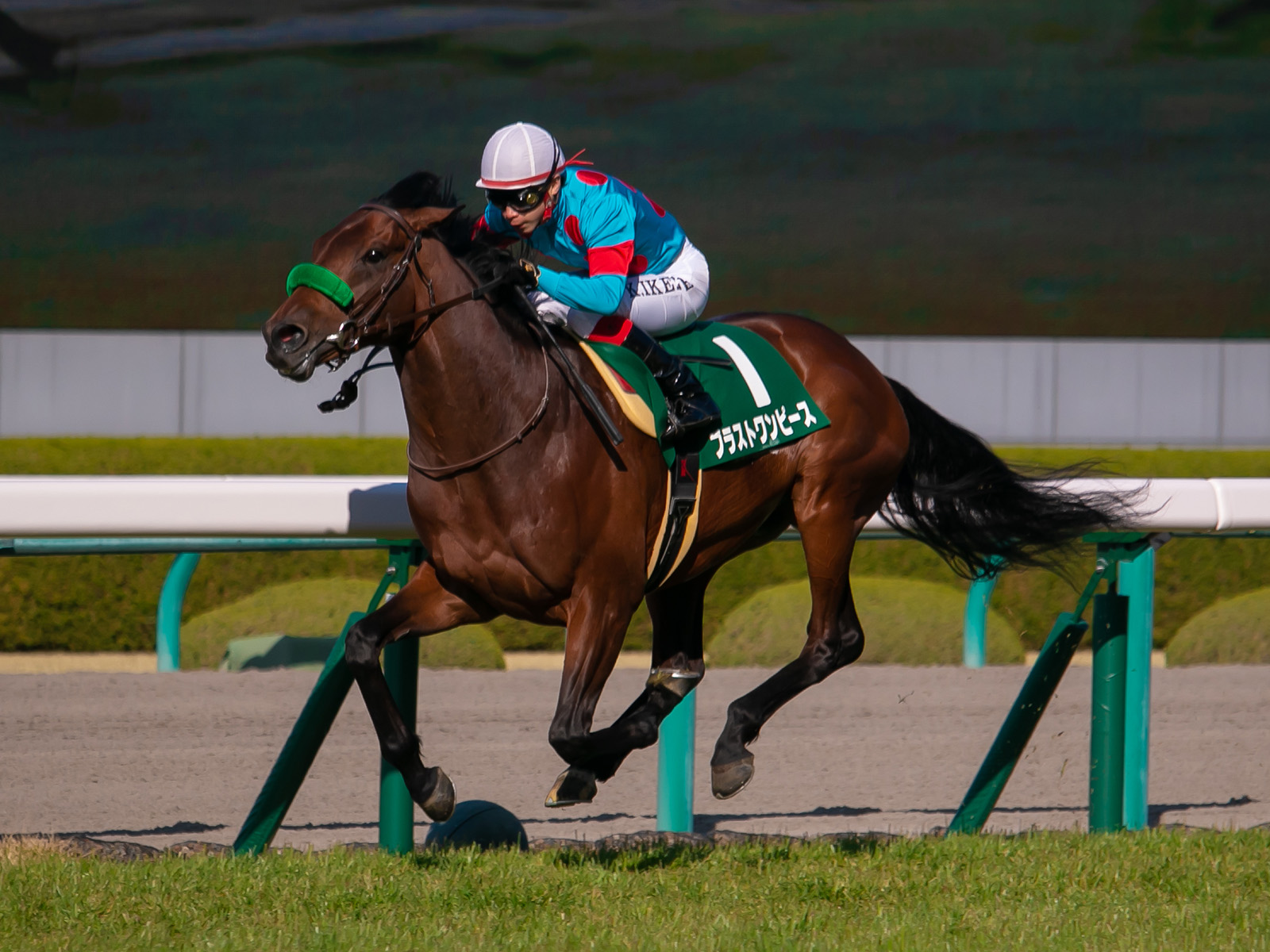
Blast Onepiece

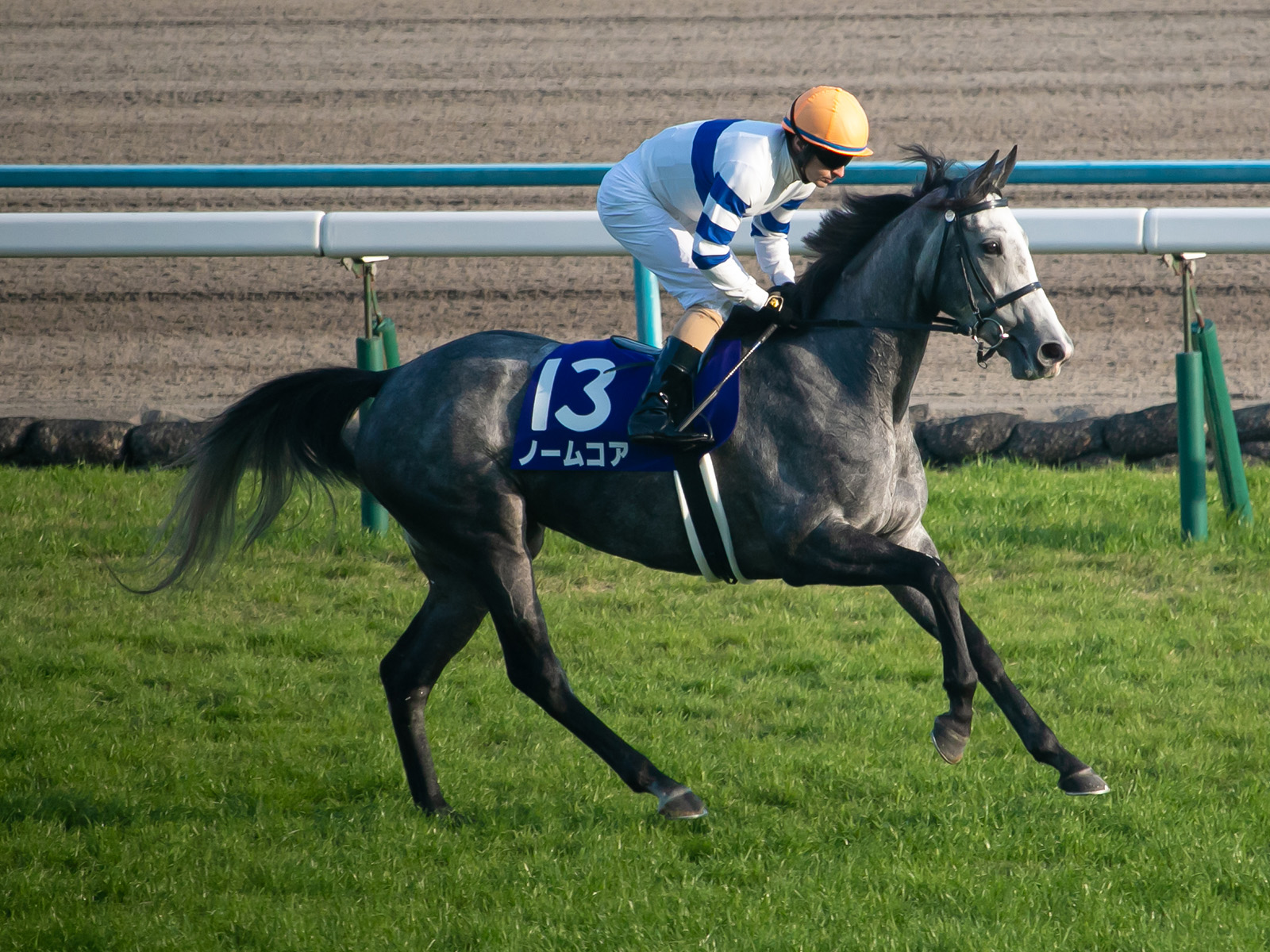
Normcore

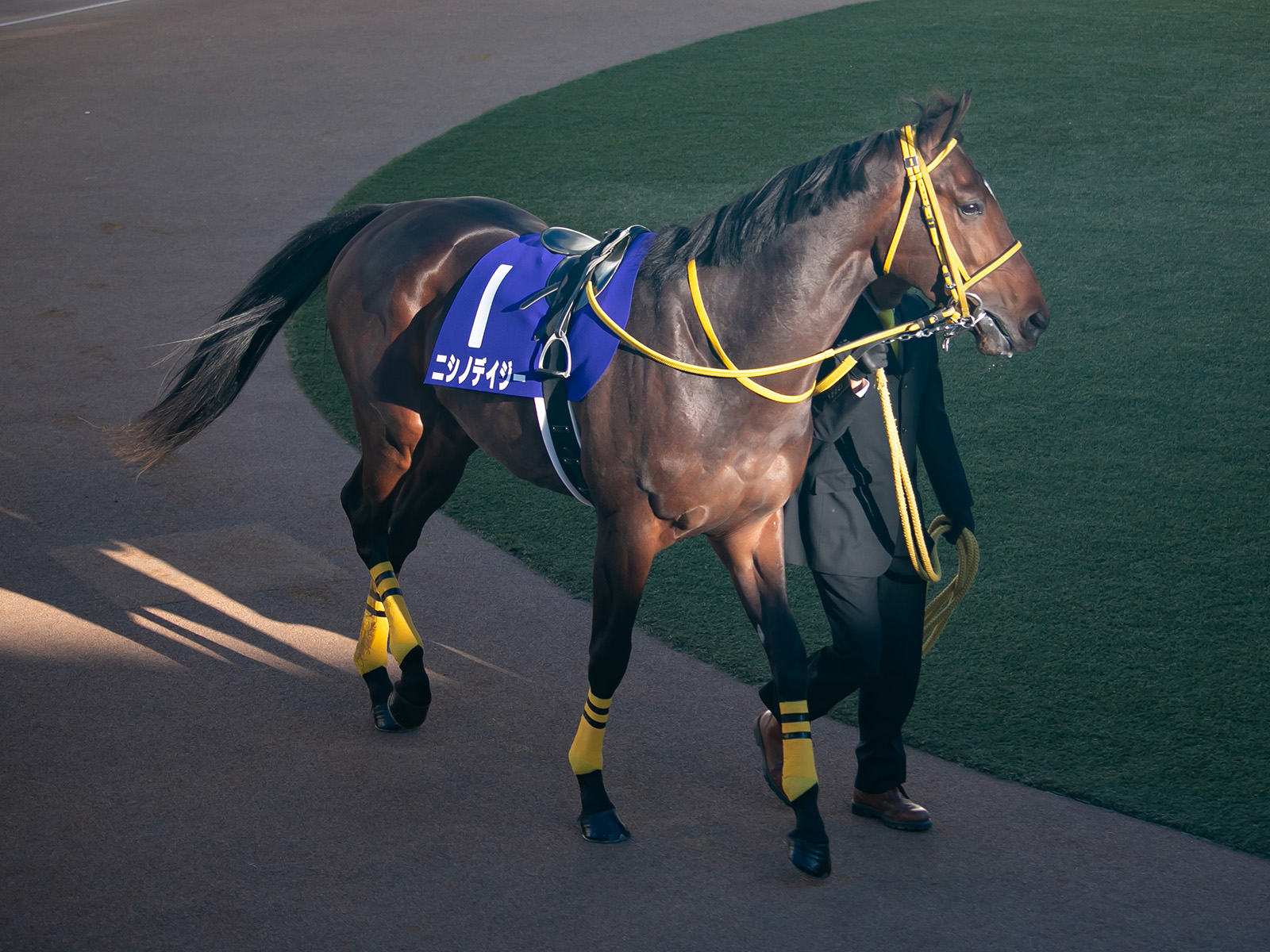
Nishino Daisy

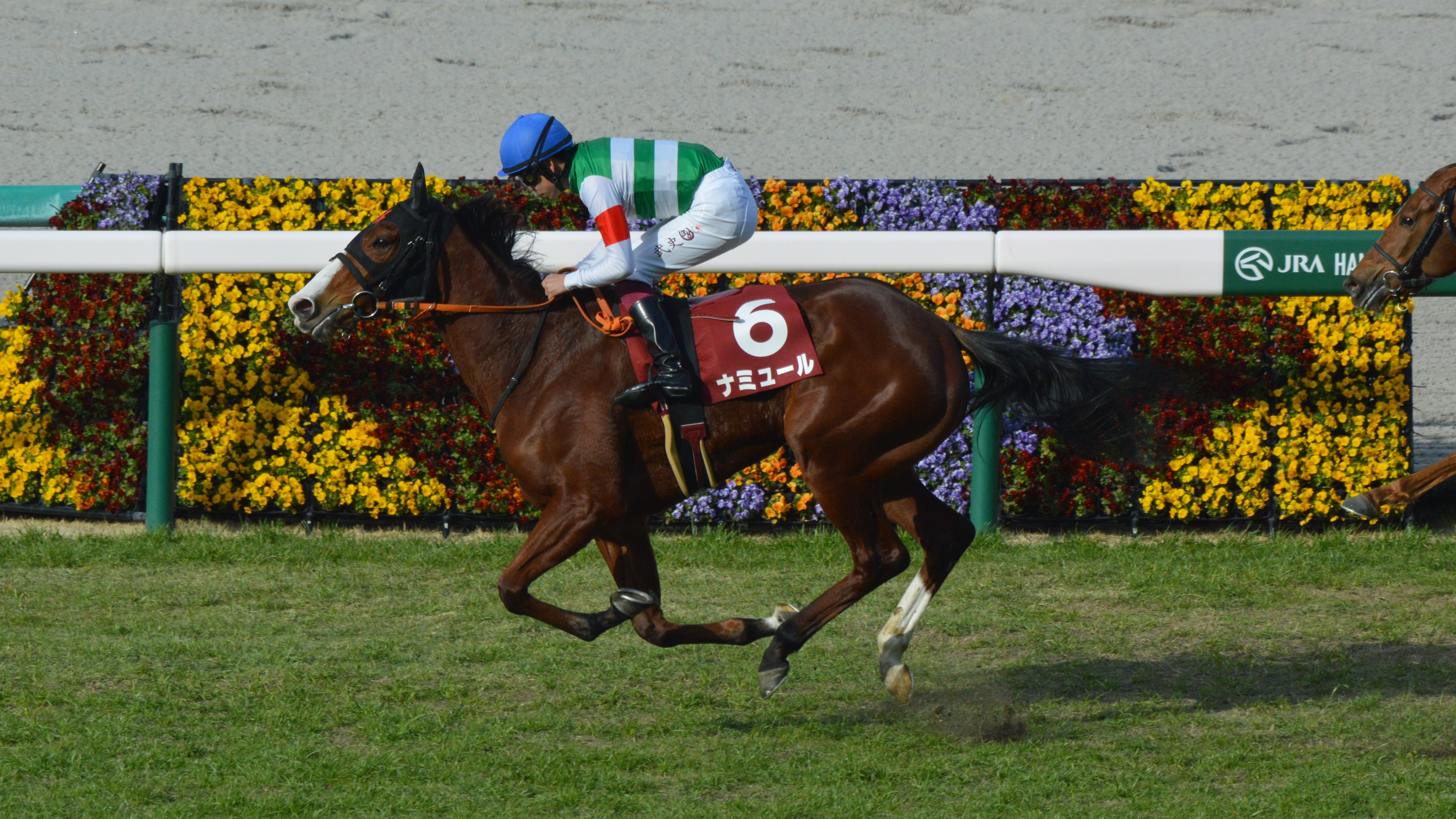
Namur

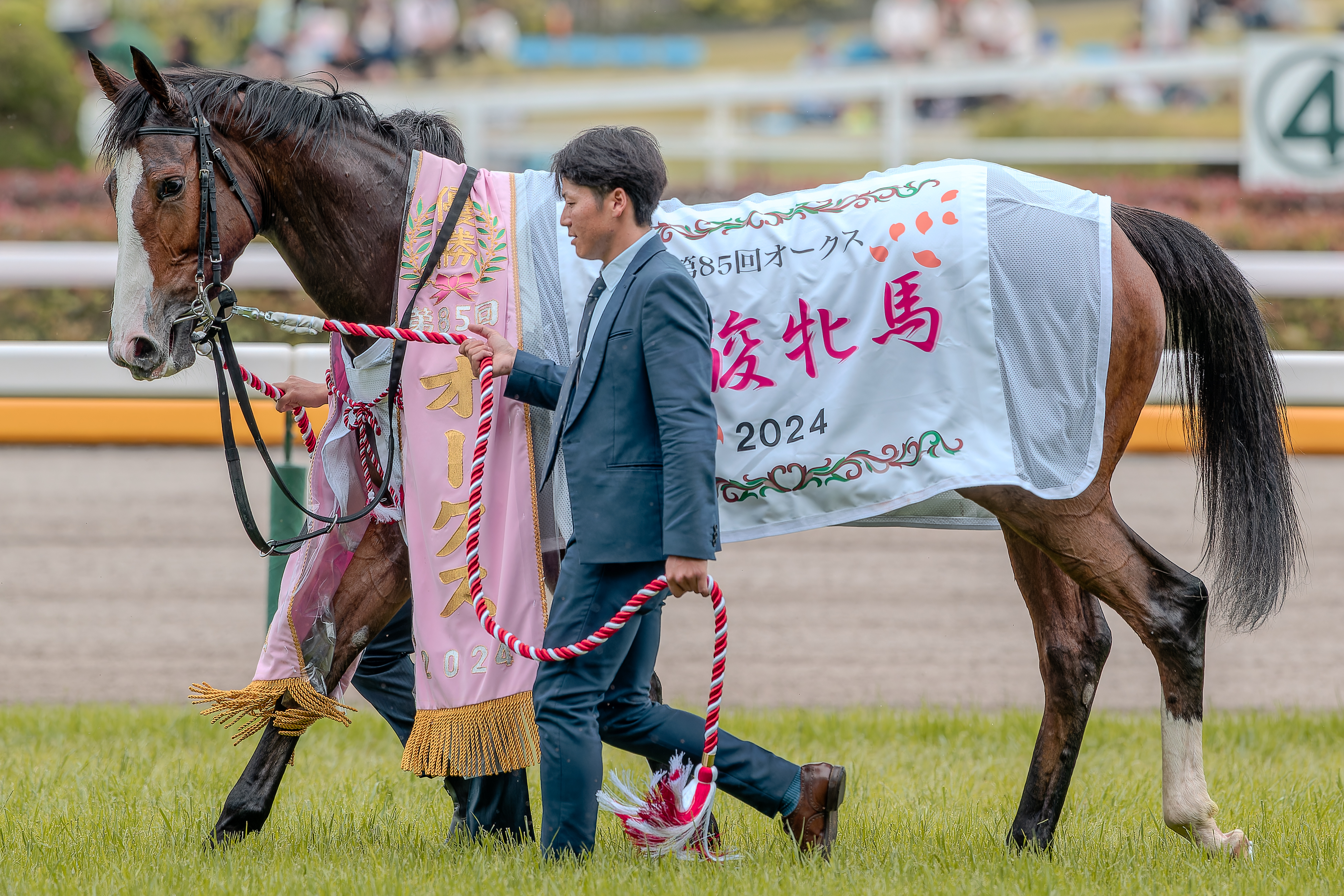
Cervinia

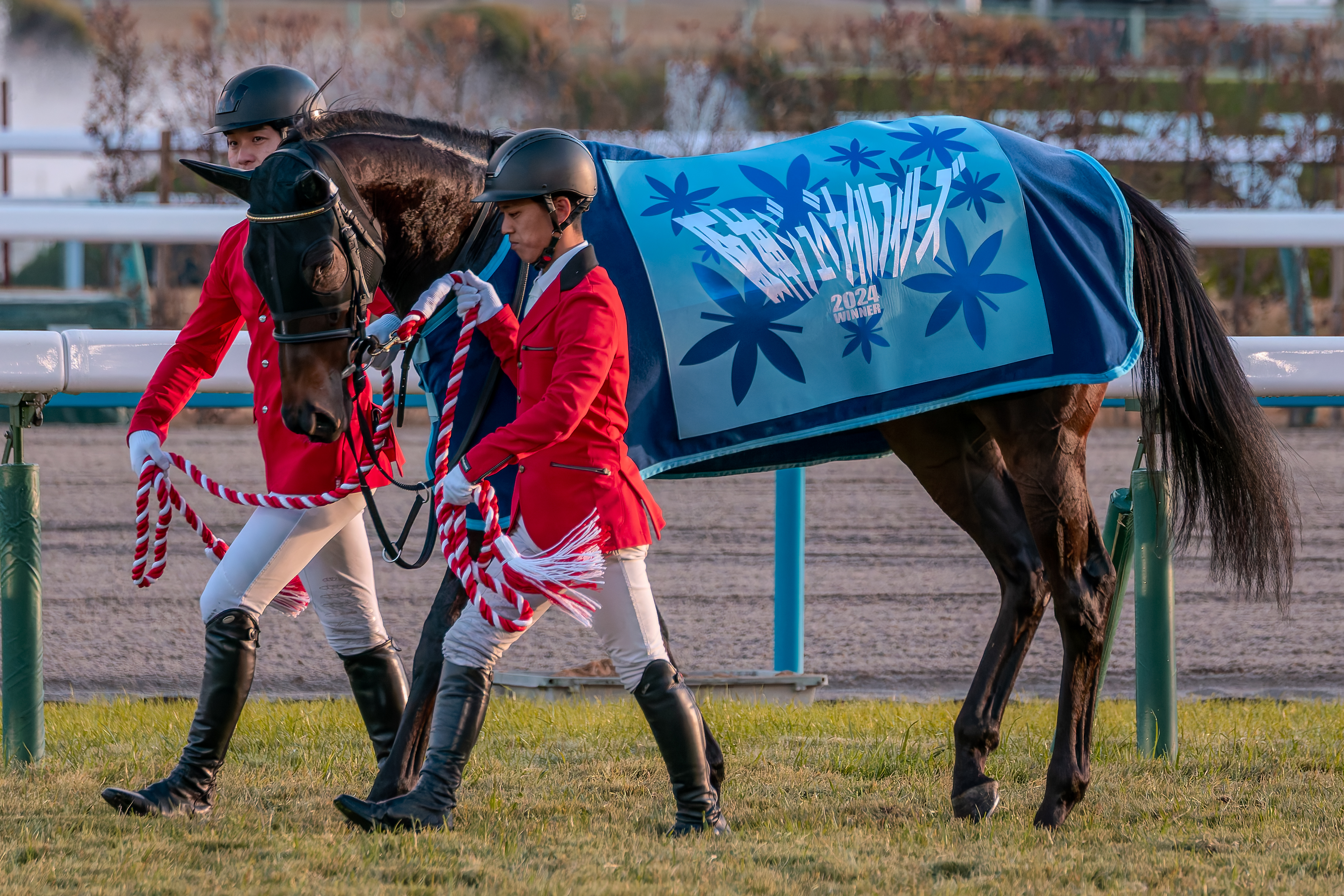
Arma Veloce

== Pedigree ==
Pedigree of Harbinger (GB), bay horse, 2006
Sire Dansili (GB) 1996	Danehill (USA); 1986	Danzig	Northern Dancer
Sire Dansili (GB) 1996	Danehill (USA); 1986	Danzig	Pas de Nom
Sire Dansili (GB) 1996	Danehill (USA); 1986	Razyana	His Majesty
Sire Dansili (GB) 1996	Danehill (USA); 1986	Razyana	Spring Adieu
Sire Dansili (GB) 1996	Hasili (IRE); 1991	Kahyasi	Ile de Bourbon
Sire Dansili (GB) 1996	Hasili (IRE); 1991	Kahyasi	Kadissya
Sire Dansili (GB) 1996	Hasili (IRE); 1991	Kerali	High Line
Sire Dansili (GB) 1996	Hasili (IRE); 1991	Kerali	Sookera
Dam Penang Pearl (FR) 1996	Bering (GB); 1983	Arctic Tern	Sea Bird
Dam Penang Pearl (FR) 1996	Bering (GB); 1983	Arctic Tern	Bubbling Beauty
Dam Penang Pearl (FR) 1996	Bering (GB); 1983	Beaune	Lyphard
Dam Penang Pearl (FR) 1996	Bering (GB); 1983	Beaune	Barbra
Dam Penang Pearl (FR) 1996	Guapa (GB); 1988	Shareef Dancer	Northern Dancer
Dam Penang Pearl (FR) 1996	Guapa (GB); 1988	Shareef Dancer	Sweet Alliance
Dam Penang Pearl (FR) 1996	Guapa (GB); 1988	Sauceboat	Connaught
Dam Penang Pearl (FR) 1996	Guapa (GB); 1988	Sauceboat	Cranberry Sauce (Family 1-k)

- Harbinger was inbred 4 × 4 × 5 to Northern Dancer, meaning that this stallion appears twice in the fourth, and once (as the sire of Lyphard) in the fifth generation of his pedigree.
