= Oju Chosan =

Thoroughbred racehorse

Oju Chosan オジュウチョウサン
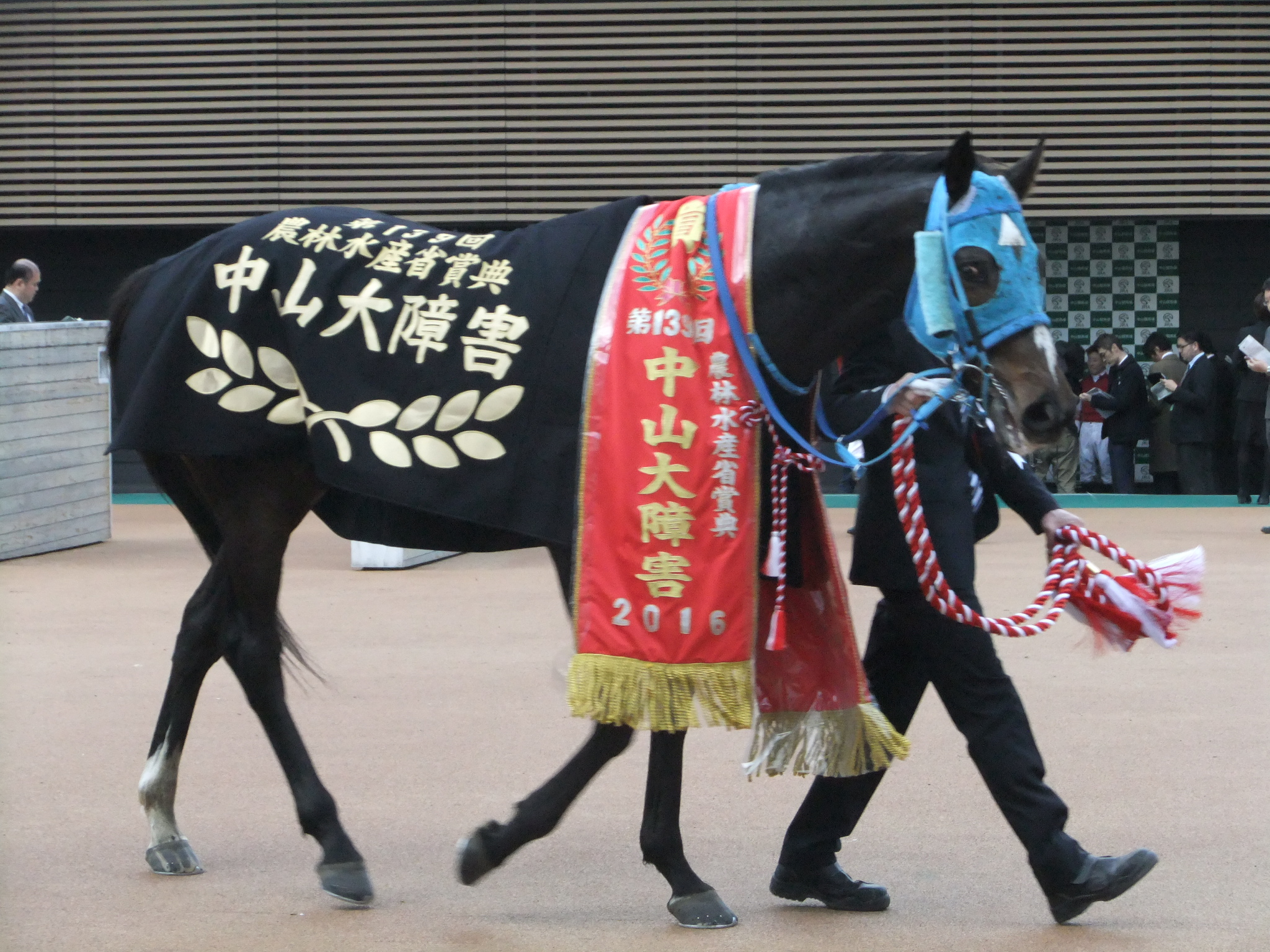
- Oju Chosan after winning the 2016 Nakayama Daishogai.
- Breed: Thoroughbred
- Sire: Stay Gold (JPN)
- Grandsire: Sunday Silence (USA)
- Dam: Shadow Silhouette (JPN)
- Damsire: Symboli Kris S (USA)
- Sex: Stallion
- Foaled: April 3, 2011 (age 15)
- Country: Japan
- Color: Bay
- Breeder: Bando Bokujo
- Owner: Chosan Co. Ltd.
- Racing colours
- Trainer: Shoichiro Wada
- Jockey: Shinichi Ishigami
- Record: 40: 20-2-4
- Earnings: ¥941,377,000

Major wins
- Nakayama Grand Jump (2016, 2017, 2018, 2019, 2020, 2022); Nakayama Daishogai (2016, 2017, 2021); Tokyo High Jump (2016, 2017); Hanshin Spring Jump (2017, 2019, 2020); Tokyo Jump Stakes (2016)

Awards
- JRA Award for Best Steeplechase Horse (2016, 2017, 2018, 2021, 2022)

Honours
- Japan Racing Association Hall of Fame (2026)
- Last updated on June 15, 2026

Oju Chosan (Japanese: オジュウチョウサン, Hepburn: Ojuu Chousan; foaled April 3, 2011) is a retired champion Japanese Thoroughbred racehorse and active breeding stallion who is best known for his multiple victories in Japan's major steeplechase races. He owns speed records in Nakayama Racecourse's two annual Grade 1 jump races: the Nakayama Grand Jump, which he has won six times (including five consecutive victories from 2016 to 2020), and the Nakayama Daishogai, which he has won on three occasions.

The Japan Racing Association (JRA) has gone so far as to release merchandise for Oju Chosan, the first such item to be unveiled for a steeplechase horse. In 2026, he was inducted into the Japan Racing Association Hall of Fame, becoming only the second steeplechase horse ever to do so, following Grand Marchs in 1985.

== Background ==
Oju Chosan's father is Stay Gold, a winner of 7 races from 50 starts who would later become one of Japan's most influential stallions, siring such flat champions as Orfevre and Gold Ship. Stay Gold's father is American Horse of the Year and Triple Crown contender Sunday Silence.

Oju Chosan's mother is Shadow Silhouette, sired by two-time Japanese Horse of the Year Symboli Kris S.

== Racing career ==
Oju Chosan made his debut at the Tokyo Racecourse under the training of Mitsuhiro Ogata in October 2013 in a flat race but finished in 11th place and his second race in 8th place, before a broken front leg forced him to take a year off, by which point maiden races that suited Oju Chosan had finished. They then had him run in a steeplechase race in November 2014, but he came in last.

Training role was passed from Ogata to Shoichirō Wada soon after, with Shinichi Ishigami being his primary jockey. From there, Oju Chosan's performance gradually improved, as he would go on to win 11 steeplechase races in a row from 2016 to 2019, and ultimately win 20 races from 38 starts as of April 2022. In addition to his victories in the Nakayama Grand Jump and Nakayama Daishogai, he has won the Grade 2 Tokyo High Jump at Tokyo Racecourse two times and the Grade 2 Hanshin Spring Jump at Hanshin Racecourse three times.

Oju Chosan's victory at the Nakayama Grand Jump in 2022 made him the oldest horse in Japan to win a graded race, as well as the most wins in a JRA G1 steeplechase races.

Oju Chosan retired in December 2022 after finishing in 6th place at the 2022 Nakayama Daishogai behind Nishino Daisy. He went to stand stud at the Versailles Farm in Hokkaido starting from 2023.

== Racing statistics ==
The following form is based on information available on netkeiba.com and JBIS-Search.

Date	Distance (Condition)	Race	Class	Course	Field	Odds (Favourite)	Finish	Time	Winning (Losing) Margin	Winner (2nd Place)	Jockey	Ref
2013 – Two-year-old season
Oct 19	Turf 1800 m (Firm)	Two Year Old Debut		Tokyo	15	66.5 (12th)	11th	1:54.3	(5 1/4 lengths)	Logi Taste	Masami Matsuoka	
Nov 16	Turf 2000 m (Firm)	Two Year Old		Tokyo	13	219.1 (11th)	8th	2:02.9	(11 1/4 lengths)	Bell Canyon	Kosei Miura	
2014 – Three-year-old season
Nov 15	Jump 2800 m (Firm)	Three Year Old and Up		Fukushima	14	99.1 (14th)	14th	3:19.6	(~75 lengths)	Shigeru Hitachi	Kei Oehara	
2015 – Four-year-old season
Jan 5	Jump 2880 m (Firm)	Four Year Old and Up		Nakayama	12	101.7 (11th)	2nd	3:19.6	(1/4 length)	Ace One	Koshi Yamamoto	
Jan 24	Jump 3000 m (Soft)	Four Year Old and Up		Chukyo	13	5.8 (2nd)	3rd	3:24.3	(3 lengths)	Kau Wela	Koshi Yamamoto	
Feb 21	Jump 3000 m (Firm)	Four Year Old and Up		Tokyo	14	6.3 (4th)	1st	3:25.0	3 1/2 lengths	(Ifu Dodo)	Koshi Yamamoto	
Mar 21	Jump 3300 m (Good)	Four Year Old and Up Open	OP	Chukyo	14	6.0 (3rd)	1st	3:39.9	1 1/4 lengths	(Admire Simon)	Koshi Yamamoto	
Jun 6	Jump 3100 m (Heavy)	Three Year Old and Up Open	OP	Tokyo	13	8.0 (4th)	9th	3:34.6	(17 3/4 lengths)	Sanacion	Koshi Yamamoto	
Jun 27	Jump 3110 m (Good)	Tokyo Jump Stakes	J・GIII	Tokyo	14	62.0 (9th)	4th	3:28.3	(6 3/4 lengths)	Osumi Moon	Shinichi Ishigami	
Jul 25	Jump 3380 m (Firm)	Three Year Old and Up Open	OP	Fukushima	8	3.5 (2nd)	1st	3:44.0	3 lengths	(Kashima Shinsei)	Shinichi Ishigami	
Dec 5	Jump 3570 m (Firm)	Illumination Jump Stakes	OP	Nakayama	15	12.7 (4th)	4th	3:59.9	(10 1/2 lengths)	Sanacion	Shinichi Ishigami	
Dec 26	Jump 4100 m (Firm)	Nakayama Daishogai	J・GI	Nakayama	14	21.3 (6th)	6th	4:42.2	(~25 1/2 lengths)	Up to Date	Shinichi Ishigami	
2016 – Five-year-old season
Mar 6	Jump 3200 m (Firm)	Four Year Old and Up Open	OP	Nakayama	14	5.8 (2nd)	2nd	3:32.5	(1 1/4 lengths)	Nihonpiro Baron	Shinichi Ishigami	
Apr 16	Jump 4250 m (Firm)	Nakayama Grand Jump	J・GI	Nakayama	10	6.5 (2nd)	1st	4:49.4	3 1/2 lengths	(Sanacion)	Shinichi Ishigami	
Jun 25	Jump 3110 m (Good)	Tokyo Jump Stakes	J・GIII	Tokyo	14	2.0 (1st)	1st	3:26.2	1 1/2 lengths	(Win Yard)	Shinichi Ishigami	
Oct 16	Jump 3110 m (Firm)	Tokyo High Jump	J・GII	Tokyo	10	2.1 (1st)	1st	3:27.6	1 1/2 lengths	(Makio Bowler)	Shinichi Ishigami	
Dec 23	Jump 4100 m (Firm)	Nakayama Daishogai	J・GI	Nakayama	11	1.4 (1st)	1st	4:45.6	9 lengths	(Up to Date)	Shinichi Ishigami	
2017 – Six-year-old season
Mar 11	Jump 3900 m (Firm)	Hanshin Spring Jump	J・GII	Hanshin	11	1.3 (1st)	1st	4:28.1	2 1/2 lengths	(Up to Date)	Shinichi Ishigami	
Apr 15	Jump 4250 m (Firm)	Nakayama Grand Jump	J・GI	Nakayama	13	1.3 (1st)	1st	4:50.8	3 1/2 lengths	(Sanrei Duke)	Shinichi Ishigami	
Oct 15	Jump 3110 m (Soft)	Tokyo High Jump	J・GII	Tokyo	10	1.4 (1st)	1st	3:32.5	~12 lengths	(Good Sky)	Shinichi Ishigami	
Dec 23	Jump 4100 m (Firm)	Nakayama Daishogai	J・GI	Nakayama	15	1.1 (1st)	1st	R4:36.1	1/2 length	(Up to Date)	Shinichi Ishigami	
2018 – Seven-year-old season
Apr 14	Jump 4250 m (Firm)	Nakayama Grand Jump	J・GI	Nakayama	12	1.5 (1st)	1st	R4:43.0	15 lengths	(Up to Date)	Shinichi Ishigami	
Jul 7	Turf 2600 m (Good)	Kaiseizan Tokubetsu	1 Win	Fukushima	12	2.0 (1st)	1st	2:42.3	3 lengths	(Dream Spirit)	Yutaka Take	
Nov 3	Turf 2400 m (Firm)	Nambu Tokubetsu	2 Win	Tokyo	7	3.1 (3rd)	1st	2:25.0	1/2 length	(Black Platinum)	Yutaka Take	
Dec 23	Turf 2500 m (Good)	Arima Kinen	GI	Nakayama	16	9.2 (5th)	9th	2:33.0	(5 lengths)	Blast Onepiece	Yutaka Take	
2019 – Eight-year-old season
Mar 9	Jump 3900 m (Firm)	Hanshin Spring Jump	J・GII	Hanshin	12	1.1 (1st)	1st	4:23.6	2 1/2 lengths	(Taisei Dream)	Shinichi Ishigami	
Apr 13	Jump 4250 m (Firm)	Nakayama Grand Jump	J・GI	Nakayama	11	1.1 (1st)	1st	4:47.6	2 1/2 lengths	(Thinking Dancer)	Shinichi Ishigami	
Oct 6	Turf 2400 m (Firm)	Rokusha Stakes	3 Win	Tokyo	15	3.4 (1st)	10th	2:26.6	(5 1/2 lengths)	African Gold	Shinichi Ishigami	
Nov 3	Turf 2500 m (Firm)	Copa Republica Argentina	GII	Tokyo	13	19.4 (7th)	12th	2:32.8	(7 3/4 lengths)	Muito Obrigado	Masami Matsuoka	
Nov 30	Turf 3600 m (Firm)	Stayers Stakes	GII	Nakayama	13	6.5 (4th)	6th	3:46.5	(2 1/4 lengths)	Mondo Intero	Mirco Demuro	
2020 – Nine-year-old season
Mar 14	Jump 3900 m (Good)	Hanshin Spring Jump	J・GII	Hanshin	9	1.7 (1st)	1st	R4:19.1	9 lengths	(Shingun Michael)	Shinichi Ishigami	
Apr 18	Jump 4250 m (Heavy)	Nakayama Grand Jump	J・GI	Nakayama	11	1.1 (1st)	1st	5:02.9	3 lengths	(Meisho Dassai)	Shinichi Ishigami	
Nov 14	Jump 3140 m (Firm)	Kyoto Jump Stakes	J・GIII	Hanshin	6	1.1 (1st)	3rd	3:29.8	(1 1/2 lengths)	Tagano Espresso	Shinichi Ishigami	
2021 – Ten-year-old season
Apr 17	Jump 4250 m (Firm)	Nakayama Grand Jump	J・GI	Nakayama	8	2.2 (2nd)	5th	4:52.6	(14 3/4 lengths)	Meisho Dassai	Shinichi Ishigami	
Oct 17	Jump 3110 m (Good)	Tokyo High Jump	J・GII	Tokyo	12	2.1 (1st)	3rd	3:29.1	(2 lengths)	Love and Pop	Shinichi Ishigami	
Dec 25	Jump 4100 m (Good)	Nakayama Daishogai	J・GI	Nakayama	14	3.3 (2nd)	1st	4:46.6	3 lengths	(Blason d'Amour)	Shinichi Ishigami	
2022 – Eleven-year-old season
Mar 12	Jump 3900 m (Firm)	Hanshin Spring Jump	J・GII	Hanshin	11	1.7 (1st)	3rd	4:21.5	(1 3/4 lengths)	A Shin Click	Shinichi Ishigami	
Apr 16	Jump 4250 m (Good)	Nakayama Grand Jump	J・GI	Nakayama	9	2.1 (1st)	1st	4:52.3	1 1/4 lengths	(Blason d'Amour)	Shinichi Ishigami	
Oct 16	Jump 3110 m (Firm)	Tokyo High Jump	J・GII	Tokyo	12	2.7 (2nd)	9th	3:33.4	(~45 lengths)	Xenoverse	Shinichi Ishigami	
Dec 24	Jump 4100 m (Firm)	Nakayama Daishogai	J・GI	Nakayama	11	2.4 (1st)	6th	4:48.2	(13 1/2 lengths)	Nishino Daisy	Shinichi Ishigami	

- R in the chart and the time written in red indicates the horse finished in record time.

== Pedigree ==
Pedigree of Oju Chosan (JPN), bay horse, April 3, 2011
Sire Stay Gold (JPN) (1994)	Sunday Silence (USA) (1986)	Halo	Hail to Reason
Sire Stay Gold (JPN) (1994)	Sunday Silence (USA) (1986)	Halo	Cosmah
Sire Stay Gold (JPN) (1994)	Sunday Silence (USA) (1986)	Wishing Well	Understanding
Sire Stay Gold (JPN) (1994)	Sunday Silence (USA) (1986)	Wishing Well	Mountain Flower
Sire Stay Gold (JPN) (1994)	Golden Sash (1988)	Dictus (FR)	Sanctus
Sire Stay Gold (JPN) (1994)	Golden Sash (1988)	Dictus (FR)	Doronic
Sire Stay Gold (JPN) (1994)	Golden Sash (1988)	Dyna Sash	Northern Taste (CAN)
Sire Stay Gold (JPN) (1994)	Golden Sash (1988)	Dyna Sash	Royal Sash (GB)
Dam Shadow Silhouette (JPN) (2005)	Symboli Kris S (USA) (1999)	Kris S.	Roberto
Dam Shadow Silhouette (JPN) (2005)	Symboli Kris S (USA) (1999)	Kris S.	Sharp Queen
Dam Shadow Silhouette (JPN) (2005)	Symboli Kris S (USA) (1999)	Tee Kay	Gold Meridian
Dam Shadow Silhouette (JPN) (2005)	Symboli Kris S (USA) (1999)	Tee Kay	Tri Argo
Dam Shadow Silhouette (JPN) (2005)	Yuwa Joyner (1990)	Mill George (USA)	Mill Reef
Dam Shadow Silhouette (JPN) (2005)	Yuwa Joyner (1990)	Mill George (USA)	Miss Charisma II
Dam Shadow Silhouette (JPN) (2005)	Yuwa Joyner (1990)	Sashima Thunder	Never Beat (GB)
Dam Shadow Silhouette (JPN) (2005)	Yuwa Joyner (1990)	Sashima Thunder	Shara (GB) (Family 4-i)

- Oju Chosan was inbred 4 × 5 to Hail to Reason, meaning that this stallion appears in both the fourth and fifth generations of his pedigree.

== See also ==
- List of racehorses
