= Up to Date (horse) =

Japanese Thoroughbred racehorse (foaled 2010)

Up to Date; アップトゥデイト
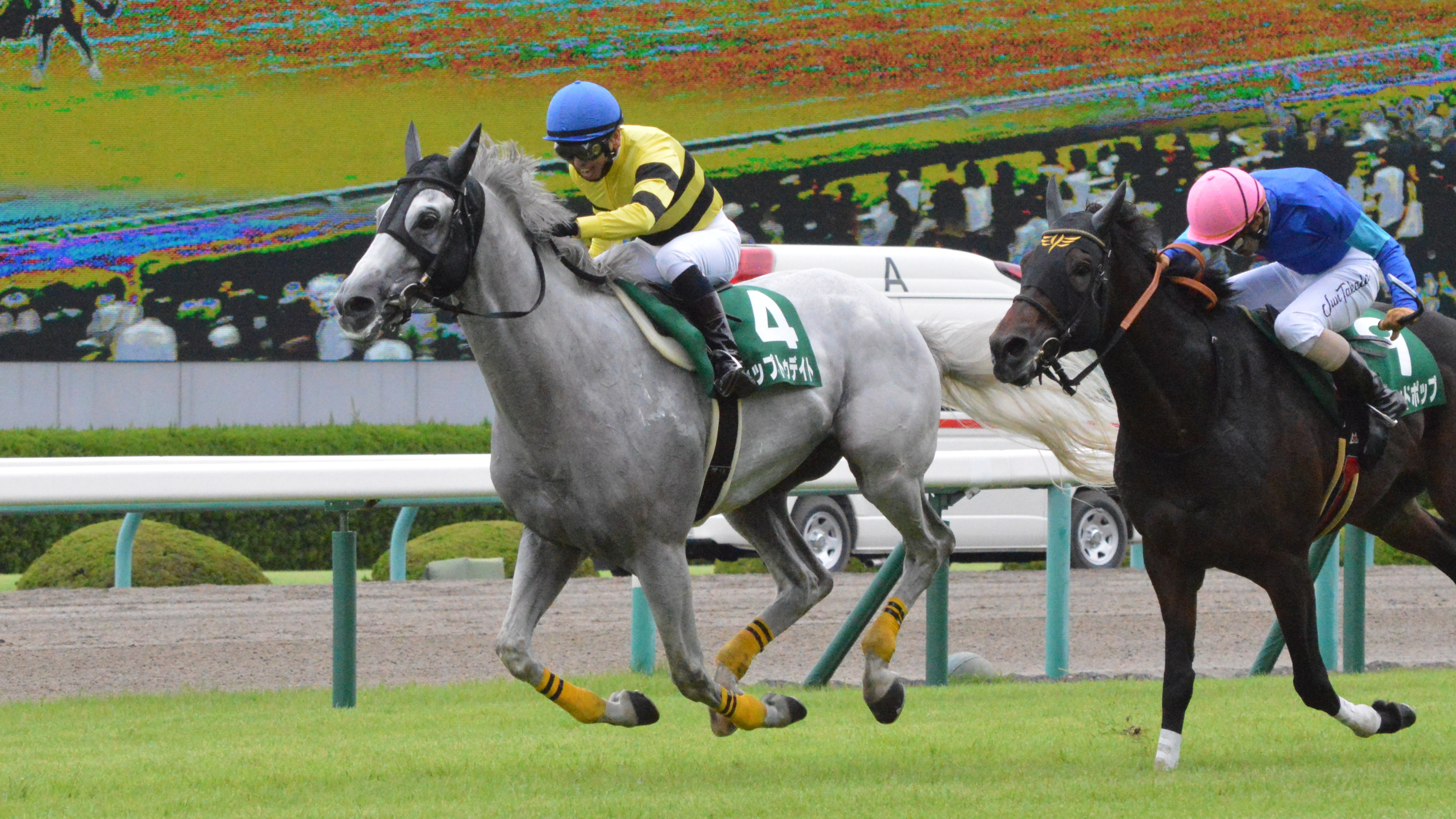
- Up to Date at the 2018 Hanshin Jump Stakes
- Breed: Thoroughbred
- Sire: Kurofune
- Grandsire: French Deputy
- Dam: Linear Muse
- Damsire: Tony Bin
- Sex: Stallion
- Foaled: 18 February 2010 (age 16)
- Country: Japan
- Colour: Grey
- Breeder: North Hills
- Owner: Kazuo Imanishi; ->Koji Maeda; ->Hiroe Imanishi
- Racing colours
- Trainer: Shozo Sasaki
- Jockey: Mitsuaki Hayashi; Yuzo Shirahama; Tetsuzo Sato; Yuya Mizuguchi; Yasunari Iwata; Osamu Shimohara; Shu Ishibashi; Shinichiro Akiyama; Hayato Yoshida; Toru Ojima; Yutaka Take; Futoshi Komaki
- Record: 37: 10-11-2
- Earnings: ¥476,095,000

Major wins
- Nakayama Grand Jump (2015); Nakayama Daishogai (2015); Hanshin Spring Jump (2018); Kokura Summer Jump (2015); Hanshin Jump Stakes (2017, 2018)

Awards
- JRA Award for Best Steeplechase Horse (2015)

Up to Date (Japanese: アップトゥデイト, Appu Tu Deito; foaled 18 February 2010) is a retired Japanese Thoroughbred racehorse who competed on the flat and over steeplechase obstacles. He recorded ten wins from thirty-seven starts, including the Nakayama Grand Jump (J-GI) and the Nakayama Daishogai (J-GI) in 2015, and was named Best Steeplechase Horse that year. He was the first horse to complete the spring-autumn J-GI steeplechase double since the introduction of the jump grade system, and was regarded as the chief rival of Oju Chosan.

== Background ==
Up to Date is a grey stallion bred in Niikappu, Hokkaido, by North Hills. He was sired by Kurofune, and his dam was Linear Muse, a mare by Tony Bin. He was owned by Kazuo Imanishi, before briefly being transferred to Koji Maeda and later to Hiroe Imanishi. He was trained by Shozo Sasaki at the JRA's Ritto Training Center. He had a habit of yawning during the paddock parade.

== Racing career ==
=== 2012: two-year-old season ===
Up to Date debuted on 7 July 2012 in a 2-year-old newcomer race over 1400 metres on dirt at Chukyo Racecourse, winning by 0.1 seconds. After a seventh in the Chukyo Nisai Stakes, he won the Yamaboshi Sho at Hanshin Racecourse on 29 September. He then finished second in the Hyogo Junior Grand Prix at Sonoda and third, as the 1st favourite, in the Zen-Nippon Nisai Yushun at Kawasaki.

=== 2013: three-year-old season ===
On the flat, Up to Date failed to reproduce his early form. His only placing in this period was a fifth in the Okehazama Stakes on 20 July at Chukyo. He finished unplaced in the Hyacinth Stakes, Fukuryu Stakes, Busan Stakes, Osaka Sports Hai, and Heijokyo Stakes.

=== 2014: four-year-old season ===
Up to Date continued to struggle on the flat, finishing unplaced in the Moji Stakes, Harima Stakes, Nobi Tokubetsu, and Kyushu Sports Hai. On 6 September, he was switched to steeplechase races with Mitsuaki Hayashi. Trainer Shozo Sasaki, who had avoided training jump horses after a riding accident, reasoned that a timid horse would jump carefully. After a second on his jump debut at Kokura, he won his next two starts at Hanshin and Kyoto Racecourse.

=== 2015: five-year-old season ===
He began the year with a second in the Nakayama Shinsun Jump Stakes and a fourth in the Hanshin Spring Jump (J-GII). On 18 April, he contested the Nakayama Grand Jump (J-GI) at Nakayama Racecourse. He won by a wide margin in a record time of 4:46.6, recording his first J-GI victory and the first J-GI victory for jockey Mitsuaki Hayashi in his 30th year as a rider. He then won the Kokura Summer Jump (J-GIII), and on 26 December he won the Nakayama Daishogai (J-GI), catching Sanacion in the final straight. He became the first horse to win both spring and autumn J-GI steeplechase races in the same year since the jump grade system was introduced, and was named Best Steeplechase Horse at the 2015 JRA Awards.

=== 2016: six-year-old season ===
He began the year in the Hanshin Spring Jump, ridden by Yuzo Shirahama after Hayashi was injured in a fall. He finished second behind Sanacion. He missed the Nakayama Grand Jump with a bone bruise in his left foreleg. He then finished eighth in the Niigata Jump Stakes, second in the Hanshin Jump Stakes, and second in the Nakayama Daishogai behind Oju Chosan.

=== 2017: seven-year-old season ===
Up to Date finished second in the Hanshin Spring Jump, third in the Nakayama Grand Jump, and second in the Kokura Summer Jump, all behind or beside Oju Chosan. On 16 September, he won the Hanshin Jump Stakes by 1.0 seconds. On 23 December, he finished second to Oju Chosan in the Nakayama Daishogai.

=== 2018: eight-year-old season ===
He won the Hanshin Spring Jump (J-GII) on 10 March, then finished second to Oju Chosan in the Nakayama Grand Jump and the Kokura Summer Jump. On 15 September, he won the Hanshin Jump Stakes for the second consecutive year, his sixth jump graded stakes victory. On 22 December, he started 1st favourite in the Nakayama Daishogai in the absence of Oju Chosan, but fell at the final obstacle and was pulled up. He did not race again. His JRA registration was cancelled on 26 July 2019, and he became a riding horse at the JRA Equestrian Park.

== Race record ==
The following table details all 37 starts of Up to Date's racing career based on official JBIS and netkeiba records. Record current as of his final start on 22 December 2018.

Date	Distance (Condition)	Race	Class	Course	Odds (Favourite)	Field	Finish	Time	Jockey	Winning (Losing) Margin	Winner (2nd Place)	Ref
2012 – two-year-old season
Jul 7	Dirt 1400 m (Heavy)	2-Y-O Newcomer	Maiden	Chukyo	17.7 (5th)	12	1st	1:25.0	Tetsuzo Sato	–0.1	(Chrysolite)	
Jul 22	Turf 1400 m (Yielding)	Chukyo Nisai Stakes	Open	Chukyo	22.1 (7th)	8	7th	1:25.0	Tetsuzo Sato	1.1	A Shin Top	
Sep 29	Dirt 1400 m (Good)	Yamaboshi Sho	1-win	Hanshin	8.1 (4th)	14	1st	1:25.4	Tetsuzo Sato	–0.0	(Malvern Hills)	
Nov 29	Dirt 1400 m (Yielding)	Hyogo Junior Grand Prix	JpnII	Sonoda	2.6 (2nd)	11	2nd	1:27.3	Osamu Shimohara	0.9	Keiai Leone	
Dec 19	Dirt 1600 m (Good)	Zen-Nippon Nisai Yushun	JpnI	Kawasaki	3.2 (1st)	14	3rd	1:42.6	Yasunari Iwata	0.7	Someries	
2013 – three-year-old season
Feb 17	Dirt 1600 m (Good)	Hyacinth Stakes	Open	Tokyo	14.8 (5th)	16	10th	1:38.2	Yasunari Iwata	1.6	Charlie Brave	
Mar 31	Dirt 1800 m (Good)	Fukuryu Stakes	Open	Nakayama	73.3 (12th)	15	14th	1:55.4	Shu Ishibashi	1.8	Copano Rickey	
Jul 20	Dirt 1400 m (Good)	Okehazama Stakes	3-win	Chukyo	76.7 (14th)	16	5th	1:23.3	Yuya Mizuguchi	0.2	Narita Spring	
Aug 24	Dirt 1700 m (Heavy)	Busan Stakes	3-win	Kokura	13.3 (3rd)	16	10th	1:45.2	Yuya Mizuguchi	1.6	Machan Tamer	
Sep 21	Dirt 1400 m (Good)	Osaka Sports Hai	3-win	Hanshin	24.8 (6th)	10	8th	1:25.0	Yuya Mizuguchi	1.8	Qismah	
Oct 6	Dirt 1800 m (Good)	Heijokyo Stakes	3-win	Kyoto	39.0 (8th)	12	8th	1:52.5	Shinichiro Akiyama	0.8	Vent Nouveau	
2014 – four-year-old season
Feb 16	Dirt 1700 m (Yielding)	Moji Stakes	3-win	Kokura	77.4 (12th)	15	13th	1:44.7	Hayato Yoshida	1.6	Sambista	
Mar 16	Dirt 1400 m (Yielding)	Harima Stakes	3-win	Hanshin	150.7 (13th)	16	14th	1:25.2	Toru Ojima	1.3	Graceful Leap	
Jul 6	Dirt 1800 m (Yielding)	Nobi Tokubetsu	2-win	Chukyo	34.3 (10th)	15	9th	1:51.6	Yutaka Take	1.4	Asukano Roman	
Aug 9	Turf 2000 m (Yielding)	Kyushu Sports Hai	2-win	Kokura	82.0 (8th)	9	8th	2:00.4	Futoshi Komaki	1.5	Satono Aladdin	
Sep 6	Jump 2900 m (Good)	Jump 3-Y-O+ Maiden	Maiden	Kokura	5.0 (2nd)	8	2nd	3:11.4	Mitsuaki Hayashi	0.4	Amakusa Haiya	
Oct 5	Jump 2970 m (Good)	Jump 3-Y-O+ Maiden	Maiden	Hanshin	1.6 (1st)	10	1st	3:20.5	Mitsuaki Hayashi	–2.5	(Admire Parthia)	
Nov 30	Jump 3170 m (Yielding)	Jump 3-Y-O+ Open	Open	Kyoto	1.8 (1st)	13	1st	3:35.6	Mitsuaki Hayashi	–0.2	(Sunrise Royal)	
2015 – five-year-old season
Jan 10	Jump 3200 m (Good)	Nakayama Shinsun Jump Stakes	Open	Nakayama	1.7 (1st)	14	2nd	3:35.6	Mitsuaki Hayashi	0.0	Wanted	
Mar 14	Jump 3900 m (Yielding)	Hanshin Spring Jump	J-GII	Hanshin	3.3 (1st)	13	4th	4:23.4	Mitsuaki Hayashi	0.0	Sanrei Duke	
Apr 18	Jump 4250 m (Good)	Nakayama Grand Jump	J-GI	Nakayama	12.0 (4th)	15	1st	R4:46.6	Mitsuaki Hayashi	–1.7	(Sombrero)	
Aug 1	Jump 3390 m (Good)	Kokura Summer Jump	J-GIII	Kokura	2.5 (2nd)	8	1st	3:42.8	Mitsuaki Hayashi	–0.2	(Biko Pililani)	
Dec 26	Jump 4100 m (Good)	Nakayama Daishogai	J-GI	Nakayama	3.5 (2nd)	14	1st	4:37.9	Mitsuaki Hayashi	–0.1	(Acorn Path)	
2016 – six-year-old season
Mar 12	Jump 3900 m (Yielding)	Hanshin Spring Jump	J-GII	Hanshin	2.1 (1st)	13	2nd	4:23.4	Yuzo Shirahama	0.9	Sanacion	
Aug 27	Jump 3250 m (Good)	Niigata Jump Stakes	J-GIII	Niigata	1.7 (1st)	14	8th	3:32.4	Mitsuaki Hayashi	2.5	Taisei Dream	
Sep 17	Jump 3140 m (Good)	Hanshin Jump Stakes	J-GIII	Hanshin	3.1 (2nd)	11	2nd	3:28.3	Mitsuaki Hayashi	0.1	Nihonpiro Baron	
Dec 23	Jump 4100 m (Good)	Nakayama Daishogai	J-GI	Nakayama	3.2 (2nd)	11	2nd	4:47.1	Mitsuaki Hayashi	1.5	Oju Chosan	
2017 – seven-year-old season
Mar 11	Jump 3900 m (Good)	Hanshin Spring Jump	J-GII	Hanshin	4.9 (2nd)	11	2nd	4:28.5	Mitsuaki Hayashi	0.4	Oju Chosan	
Apr 15	Jump 4250 m (Good)	Nakayama Grand Jump	J-GI	Nakayama	4.4 (2nd)	13	3rd	4:51.4	Mitsuaki Hayashi	1.9	Oju Chosan	
Jul 29	Jump 3390 m (Good)	Kokura Summer Jump	J-GIII	Kokura	1.6 (1st)	14	2nd	3:42.7	Mitsuaki Hayashi	0.0	Solor	
Sep 16	Jump 3140 m (Yielding)	Hanshin Jump Stakes	J-GIII	Hanshin	1.8 (1st)	7	1st	3:29.3	Mitsuaki Hayashi	–1.0	(Le Pere Noel)	
Dec 23	Jump 4100 m (Good)	Nakayama Daishogai	J-GI	Nakayama	6.8 (2nd)	15	2nd	4:36.2	Mitsuaki Hayashi	0.1	Oju Chosan	
2018 – eight-year-old season
Mar 10	Jump 3900 m (Good)	Hanshin Spring Jump	J-GII	Hanshin	1.2 (1st)	9	1st	4:23.4	Mitsuaki Hayashi	–1.3	(Good Sky)	
Apr 14	Jump 4250 m (Good)	Nakayama Grand Jump	J-GI	Nakayama	2.3 (2nd)	12	2nd	4:45.4	Mitsuaki Hayashi	2.4	Oju Chosan	
Jul 28	Jump 3390 m (Good)	Kokura Summer Jump	J-GIII	Kokura	1.2 (1st)	11	2nd	3:41.7	Yuzo Shirahama	0.4	Yokagura	
Sep 15	Jump 3140 m (Good)	Hanshin Jump Stakes	J-GIII	Hanshin	1.1 (1st)	9	1st	3:27.2	Yuzo Shirahama	–0.1	(Love and Pop)	
Dec 22	Jump 4100 m (Good)	Nakayama Daishogai	J-GI	Nakayama	1.4 (1st)	13	DNF	–	Yuzo Shirahama	–	Nihonpiro Baron	

- R indicated that it was a record time finish

== After racing ==
Following his retirement, Up to Date became a riding horse at the JRA Equestrian Park.

== Pedigree ==
Pedigree of Up to Date (JPN)
Sire Kurofune (USA) 1998	French Deputy (USA); 1992	Deputy Minister	Vice Regent
Sire Kurofune (USA) 1998	French Deputy (USA); 1992	Deputy Minister	Mint Copy
Sire Kurofune (USA) 1998	French Deputy (USA); 1992	Mitterand	Hold Your Peace
Sire Kurofune (USA) 1998	French Deputy (USA); 1992	Mitterand	Laredo Lass
Sire Kurofune (USA) 1998	Blue Avenue (USA); 1990	Classic Go Go	Pago Pago
Sire Kurofune (USA) 1998	Blue Avenue (USA); 1990	Classic Go Go	Classic Perfection
Sire Kurofune (USA) 1998	Blue Avenue (USA); 1990	Eliza Blue	Icecapade
Sire Kurofune (USA) 1998	Blue Avenue (USA); 1990	Eliza Blue	Corella
Dam Linear Muse (JPN) 1998	Tony Bin (IRE); 1983	Kampala	Kalamoun
Dam Linear Muse (JPN) 1998	Tony Bin (IRE); 1983	Kampala	State Pension
Dam Linear Muse (JPN) 1998	Tony Bin (IRE); 1983	Severn Bridge	Hornbeam
Dam Linear Muse (JPN) 1998	Tony Bin (IRE); 1983	Severn Bridge	Priddy Fair
Dam Linear Muse (JPN) 1998	Thrilling Day (USA); 1990	Prego	Be My Guest
Dam Linear Muse (JPN) 1998	Thrilling Day (USA); 1990	Prego	Audrey Joan
Dam Linear Muse (JPN) 1998	Thrilling Day (USA); 1990	Leica Pretender	Sir Tristram
Dam Linear Muse (JPN) 1998	Thrilling Day (USA); 1990	Leica Pretender	Pretend to Leica

- Up to Date is inbred 5 × 5 to Northern Dancer.

== See also ==
- Thoroughbred racing in Japan
