= JRA Award for Best Steeplechase Horse =

Japanese thoroughbred horse racing award

The JRA Award for Best Steeplechase Horse is a title awarded annually by the Japan Racing Association (JRA) to the outstanding horse of that category in horse racing in Japan. Since 1987 the honor has been part of the JRA Awards.

== Records ==
Most successful horse (5 wins):

- Oju Chosan – 2016, 2017, 2018, 2021, 2022

== Winners ==
Year	Horse	Trainer	Owner	Age
1987	No Award
1988	Yamanin Appeal	Hitoshi Nakamura	Koji Doi	5
1989	Mejiro Maskette	Mitsuhiro Ogata	Mejiro Shoji Co	4
1990	Waka Taisho	Yukio Inaba	Kihachiro Watanabe	5
1991	Symboli Kriens	Masakatsu Sakai	Symboli Ranch	6
1992	Symboli Kriens	Masakatsu Sakai	Symboli Ranch	7
1993	Broad Mind	Susumu Yano	Teruya Yoshida	5
1994	Broad Mind	Susumu Yano	Teruya Yoshida	6
1995	Return Ace	Iwasa Shunsaku	Akihiro Iida	7
1996	Polaire	Iwamoto Ichizo	Susumu Hayashi	5
1997	Our Paragon	Shigeki Matsumoto	Akira Hiroshi Kudo	6
1998	Northern Rainbow	Yasuhiro Suzuki	Teruya Yoshida	8
1999	Godspeed	Tsutomu Setoguchi	Toshinori Kondo	5
2000	Gokai	Hiroyuki Gohara	Kei Yoshihashi	7
2001	Gokai	Hiroyuki Gohara	Kei Yoshihashi	8
2002	Gilded Age	Shigeki Matsumoto	North Hills Management	5
2003	Big Taste	Tadashi Nakao	Big Co.	5
2004	Blandices	Tatsuo Fujiwara	Sunday Racing	7
2005	T M Dragon	Sadahiro Kajima	Masatsugu Takezono	3
2006	Maruka Rascal	Yutaka Masumoto	Kawacho Sangyo	4
2007	Mercy A Time	Takeshi Kohei	Yasuo Nagai	5
2008	King Joy	Yutaka Masumoto	Takao Matsuoka	6
2009	King Joy	Yutaka Masumoto	Takao Matsuoka	7
2010	Bashi Ken	Yoshihiro Takahashi	Hideo Ishibashi	5
2011	Majesty Bio	Tsuyoshi Tanaka	Bio Co. Ltd.	4
2012	Majesty Bio	Tsuyoshi Tanaka	Bio Co. Ltd.	5
2013	Apollo Maverick	Masahiro Horii	Apollo Thoroughbred Club	4
2014	Apollo Maverick	Masahiro Horii	Apollo Thoroughbred Club	5
2015	Up to Date	Shozo Sasaki	Kazuo Imanishi	5
2016	Oju Chosan	Shoichiro Wada	Chosan Co. Ltd.	5
2017	Oju Chosan	Shoichiro Wada	Chosan Co. Ltd.	6
2018	Oju Chosan	Shoichiro Wada	Chosan Co. Ltd.	7
2019	Shingun Michael	Keiji Takaichi	Shigenori Isaka	5
2020	Meisho Dassai	Yuji Iida	Kazuma Mori	7
2021	Oju Chosan	Shoichiro Wada	Chosan Co. Ltd.	10
2022	Oju Chosan	Shoichiro Wada	Chosan Co. Ltd.	11
2023	Meiner Grand	Takafumi Aoki	Thoroughbred Club Ruffian Co. Ltd.	5
2024	Nishino Daisy	Noboru Takagi	Shigeyuki Nishiyama	8
2025	Ecoro Duel	Takaki Iwato	Masatoshi Haramura	6
