= Up to date (cocktail) =

Cocktail with sherry and whiskey

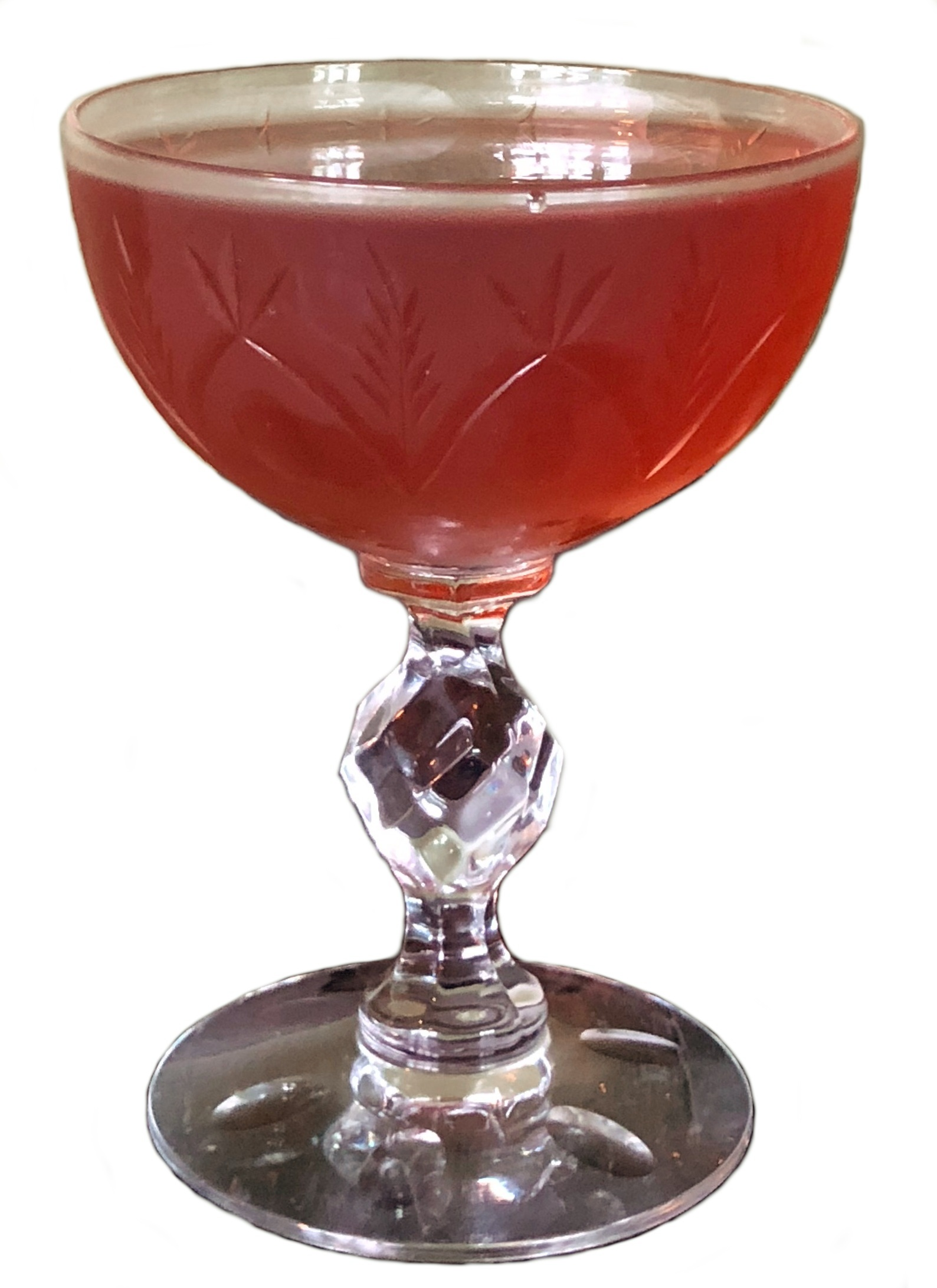
- Ingredients: 1.25 oz dry sherry; 1.25 oz rye whiskey; 0.25 oz Grand Marnier; 2 dashes Angostura bitters
- Standard drinkware: Champagne coupe
- Standard garnish: Lemon twist
- Preparation: Add sherry, rye whiskey, mariner, and bitters to a mixing glass with ice. Stir until chilled. Strain into a chilled glass, garnish with a lemon twist.

The up to date is a sherry based cocktail. The drink originated in Hugo Ensslin's (creator of the Aviation cocktail) 1916 edition of Recipes for Mixed Drinks. The taste of the cocktail has been described as savory and oily, similar to that of a Manhattan.

== See also ==
- List of cocktails
