= Nakayama Daishogai =

Nakayama Daishogai 中山大障害
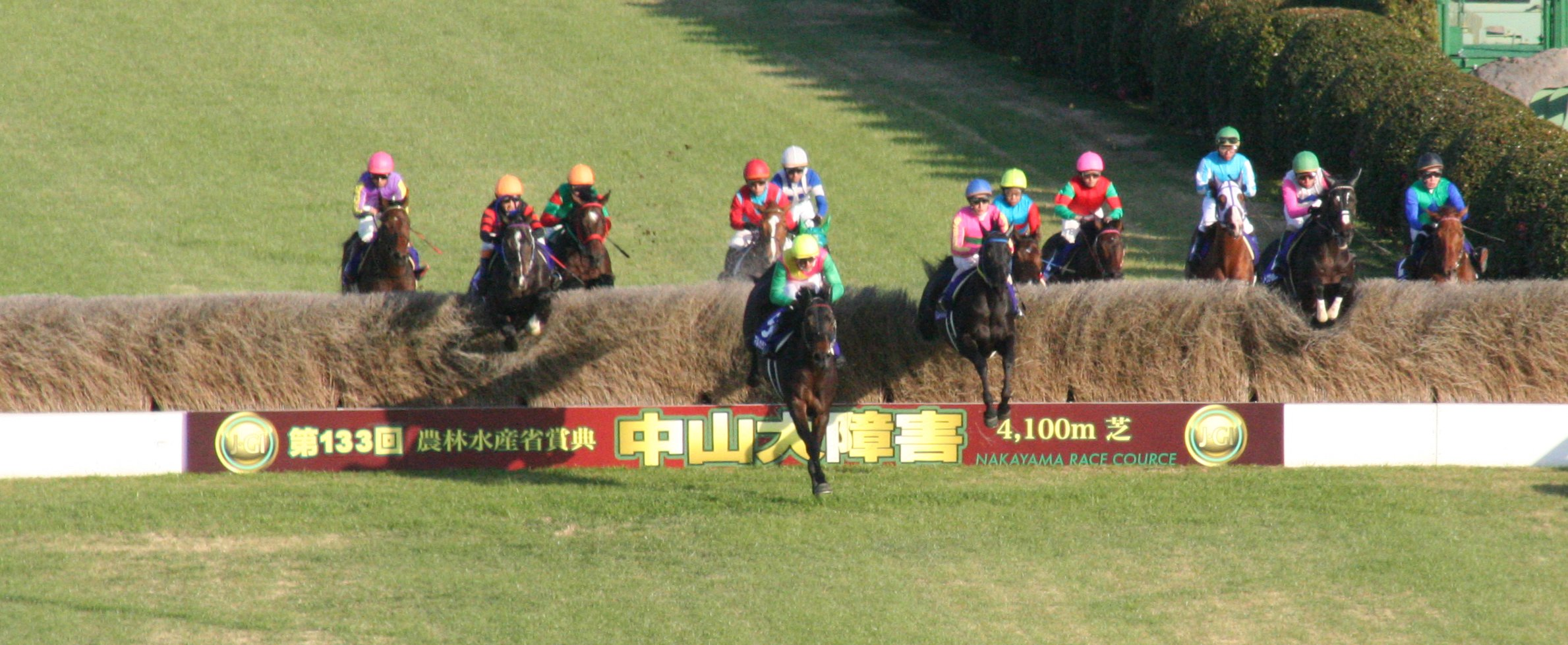
- 2010 Nakayama Daishogai
- Class: Jump Grade 1
- Location: Nakayama Racecourse
- Inaugurated: 1934
- Race type: Thoroughbred-Steeplechase

Race information
- Distance: 4100 meters
- Surface: Turf
- Track: Right and Left-handed
- Qualification: 3-y-o & Up
- Weight: 61 kg (3yo); 63 kg (4yo+); Allowances; 2 kg for fillies and mares
- Purse: ¥ 151,700,000 (as of 2025): 1st: ¥ 70,000,000; 2nd: ¥ 28,000,000; 3rd: ¥ 18,000,000

The Nakayama Daishogai (中山大障害) is a Group 1 steeplechase horse race in Japan open to thoroughbreds which are three-years-old or above. It is run over a distance of 4100m (2 1/2 miles + 84 feet) at Nakayama Racecourse every year in late December. It is one of Japan's two Group 1 jump races of the year, the other being the Nakayama Grand Jump.

Inaugurated as the Daishogai Tokubetsu in 1934, the Nakayama Daishogai had originally been run twice annually, once in the spring and once at the end of the year. In 1999, the spring race was discontinued and replaced by the Nakayama Grand Jump. The 147th running of the Daishogai was held in 2024. Nishino Daisy regained his Nakayama Daishogai title by five lengths in this edition.

== Winners since 1999 ==
Year	Winner	Age	Jockey	Trainer
1999	Godspeed	5	Makoto Nishitani	Tsutomu Setoguchi
2000	Land Power	5	Tomonori Kanaori	Masaru Hukushima
2001	Yu Fuyoho	4	Yasunari Imamura	Shigeki Matsumoto
2002	Gilded Age	5	Rochelle Lockett	Shigeki Matsumoto
2004*	Blandices	7	Takashi Oehara	Tatsuo Fujiwara
2004	Merci Taka O	5	Koichi Idetsu	Kohei Take
2005	T M Dragon	3	Yuzo Shirahama	Sadahiro Kojima
2006	Maruka Rascal	4	Makoto Nishitani	Tsutomu Setoguchi
2007	Merci A Time	5	Yoshiyuki Yokoyama	Kohei Take
2008	King Joy	6	Jun Takada	Yutaka Masumoto
2009	King Joy	7	Makoto Nishitani	Yutaka Masumoto
2010	Bashi Ken	5	Yasunori Minoshima	Yoshihiro Takahashi
2011	Majesty Bio	4	Koshi Yamamoto	Tsuyoshi Tanaka
2012	Marvelous Kaiser	4	Shigefumi Kumazawa	Masami Shibata
2013	Apollo Maverick	4	Yusuke Igarashi	Masahiro Horii
2014	Red Kingdom	5	Shinya Kitazawa	Mikio Matsunaga
2015	Up To Date	5	Mitsuaki Hayashi	Shozo Sasaki
2016	Oju Chosan	5	Shinichi Ishigami	Shoichiro Wada
2017	Oju Chosan	6	Shinichi Ishigami	Shoichiro Wada
2018	Nihonpiro Baron	8	Shinichi Ishigami	Hidetaka Tadokoro
2019	Shingun Michael	5	Mitsuki Kaneko	Keiji Takaichi
2020	Meisho Dassai	7	Kazuma Mori	Yūji Iida
2021	Oju Chosan	10	Shinichi Ishigami	Shoichiro Wada
2022	Nishino Daisy	6	Yusuke Igarashi	Noboru Takagi
2023	Meiner Grand	5	Shinichi Ishigami	Takafumi Aoki
2024	Nishino Daisy	8	Yusuke Igarashi	Noboru Takagi
2025	Ecoro Duel	6	Taro Kusano	Takaki Iwato

*There were two runnings of the Nakayama Daishogai in 2004, as the 2003 race was originally postponed due to weather.
