= Nakayama Grand Jump =

Nakayama Grand Jump 中山グランドジャンプ
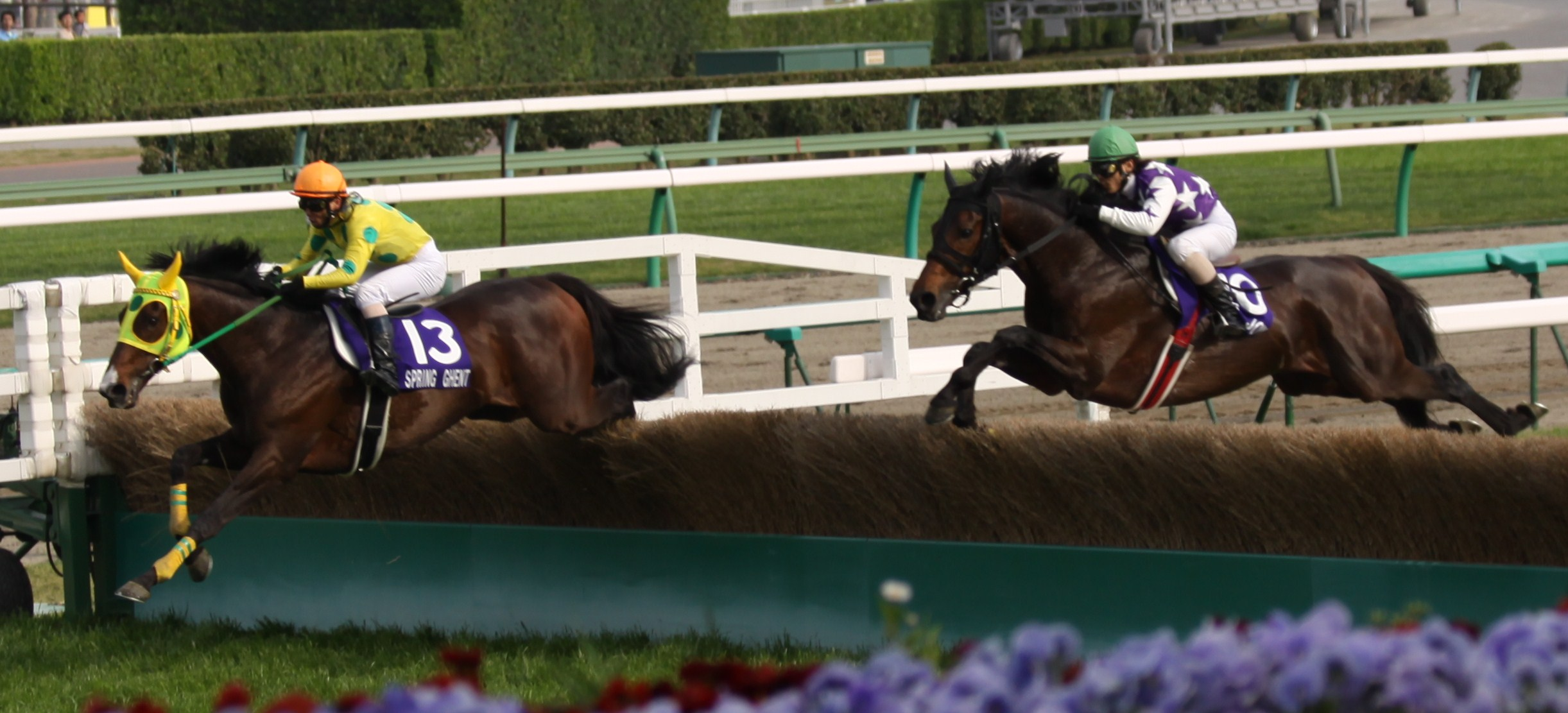
- 2009 Nakayama Grand Jump winner Spring Ghent
- Class: Jump Grade 1
- Location: Nakayama Racecourse
- Inaugurated: 1999
- Race type: Thoroughbred-Steeplechase

Race information
- Distance: 4260 meters (About 2 2/3 miles)
- Surface: Turf
- Track: Right and Left-handed
- Qualification: 4-y-o & Up, Thoroughbreds
- Weight: 4-y-o 62 kg, 5-y-o + 63 kg Allowance: Fillies & mares 2 kg
- Purse: ¥ 151,700,000 (as of 2025): 1st: ¥ 70,000,000; 2nd: ¥ 28,000,000; 3rd: ¥ 18,000,000

The Nakayama Grand Jump (中山グランドジャンプ) is a Japanese horse racing steeplechase, held at Nakayama Racecourse every year in mid-April. It is for thoroughbreds, four years old and older, run at a distance of 4,260 meters. (about 2 5/8 miles and 38 yards)

With a purse of over 142,660,000 yen, (about US$1.3 million), the Nakayama Grand Jump is one of the richest steeplechase races in the world. Held as "Nakayama Daishogai spring" until 1998, it was first run in 1999 as a 4100m race. It is one of two Grade I steeplechase races on Japanese turf, beside the Nakayama Daishogai, which slightly reconfigures the same racecourse.

The race is run on Nakayama's steeplechase course, which follows a twisted path on the racecourse interior over a series of jumps, inclines and declines. The dirt course is also crossed several times. On the final lap, with about 1200 m (3/4 mile) remaining, horses enter the outer turf course along the backstretch for the race's final three jumps. Since the inauguration of the race in 1999, it has been won by five foreign runners: St Steven (New Zealand 2002), Karasi (Australia 2005, 2006, 2007) and Blackstairmountain (Ireland 2013).

== Winners ==
Year	Winner	Age	Jockey	Trainer	Owner	Time
1999 (Note: The 1999 race was open to Japanese trained horses only.)	Mejiro Pharaoh	6	Takashi Oehara	Yokichi Okubo	Mejiro Shoji co.	4:56.2
2000	Gokai	7	Yoshiyuki Yokoyama	Hiroyuki Gohara	Kei Yoshihashi	4:43.1
2001	Gokai	8	Yoshiyuki Yokoyama	Hiroyuki Gohara	Kei Yoshihashi	4:52.3
2002	St Steven	8	Craig Thornton	John Wheeler	John Wheeler	4:50.9
2003	Big Taste	5	Katsuyoshi Tsuneishi	Tadashi Nakao	Big co.	4:48.9
2004	Blandices	7	Takashi Oehara	Tatsuo Fujiwara	Sunday Racing Co. Ltd.	4:47.0
2005	Karasi	10	Brett Scott	Eric Musgrove	Pearse Morgan	4:50.4
2006	Karasi	11	Brett Scott	Eric Musgrove	Pearse Morgan	4:50.8
2007	Karasi	12	Brett Scott	Eric Musgrove	Pearse Morgan	4:50.4
2008	Maruka Rascal	6	Makoto Nishitani	Yutaka Masumoto	Kawacho Sangyo	4:57.7
2009	Spring Ghent	9	Yuzo Shirahama	Akihiko Nomura	Haruo Kato	4:49.1
2010	Merci Mont Saint	5	Yosuke Kono	Kohei Take	Mitsuishi Farm	5:03.5
2011 (Note: As a result of 2011 Tōhoku earthquake and tsunami, the 2011 race was postponed to July 2, and run over a distance of 4260m. For this year only, three-year-olds were allowed to enter the race. The weight conditions were changed to 61.5 kg for three-year-olds and 63.5 for four-year-olds or above.)	Meiner Neos	8	Daichi Shibata	Ryuichi Inaba	K Thoroughbred Club Ruffian	4:51.6
2012	Majesty Bio	5	Daichi Shibata	Tsuyoshi Tanaka	Bio Co. Ltd.	5:02.9
2013	Blackstairmountain	8	Ruby Walsh	Willie Mullins	Susannah Ricci	4:50.5
2014	Apollo Maverick	5	Yusuke Igarashi	Masahiro Horii	Apollo Thoroughbred Club	4:50.7
2015	Up To Date	5	Mitsuaki Hayashi	Shozo Sasaki	Kazuo Imanishi	4:46.6
2016	Oju Chosan	5	Shinichi Ishigami	Shoichiro Wada	Chosan Co Ltd	4:49.64
2017	Oju Chosan	6	Shinichi Ishigami	Shoichiro Wada	Chosan Co Ltd	4:50.8
2018	Oju Chosan	7	Shinichi Ishigami	Shoichiro Wada	Chosan Co Ltd	4:43.0
2019	Oju Chosan	8	Shinichi Ishigami	Shoichiro Wada	Chosan Co Ltd	4:47.6
2020	Oju Chosan	9	Shinichi Ishigami	Shoichiro Wada	Chosan Co Ltd	5:02.9
2021	Meisho Dassai	8	Kazuma Mori	Yuji Iida	Yoshio Matsumoto	4:50.1
2022	Oju Chosan	11	Shinichi Ishigami	Shoichiro Wada	Chosan Co Ltd	4:52.3
2023	Irogotoshi	6	Yu Kuroiwa	Kazuya Makita	Gensho Uchida	4:54.1
2024	Irogotoshi	7	Yu Kuroiwa	Kazuya Makita	Gensho Uchida	4:47.2
2025	Ecoro Duel	6	Taro Kusano	Takaki Iwato	Masatoshi Haramura	4:50.5
2026	Ecoro Duel	7	Taro Kusano	Takaki Iwato	Masatoshi Haramura	4:49.0
