= Nakayama Racecourse =

Horse racing venue in Funabashi, Japan

Coordinates: 35°43′32″N 139°57′45″E

Nakayama Racecourse 中山競馬場
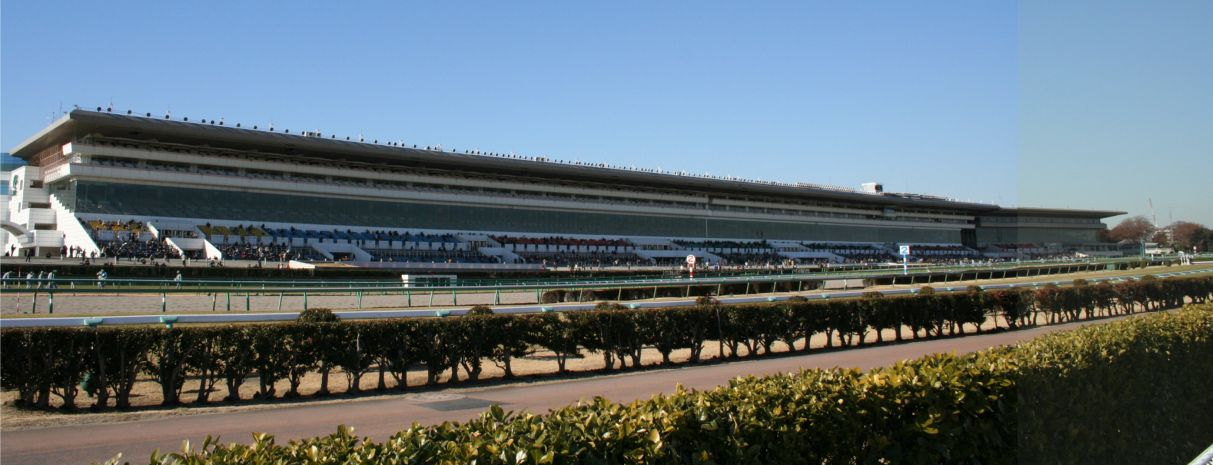
- Nakayama Racecourse Grandstand
- Interactive map of Nakayama Racecourse 中山競馬場
- Location: Funabashi, Chiba, Japan
- Owned by: Japan Racing Association
- Date opened: 1907
- Screened on: TV Tokyo (Sat); Fuji TV (Sun); TVG Network (USA); NHK (both General TV and BS-hi) (selected races)
- Course type: Flat, Steeplechase
- Notable races: Arima Kinen (Grand Prix); Satsuki Sho; Nakayama Grand Jump; Sprinters Stakes; Hopeful Stakes; Nakayama Daishogai

Nakayama Racecourse (中山競馬場, Nakayama-keibajō) is a horse-racing venue for Japan's central horse-racing circuit, located in Funabashi, Chiba Prefecture, with part of the grounds extending into Ichikawa. It is operated and administered by the Japan Racing Association, and is considered one of Japan's four major racecourses.

Among the Grade 1 races held at Nakayama are the Satsuki Shō, Sprinters Stakes, and the Arima Kinen. The racecourse is also the venue for the Nakayama Grand Jump and the Nakayama Daishogai, two of Japan's principal Steeplechase events.

Built in 1907, the venue can accommodate up to 165,676 spectators.

== Physical attributes ==
Nakayama Race Course has two grass courses, a dirt course and a jump course.

The turf's outer oval (外回り, sotomawari) measures 1840m (1 1/8 miles + 97 feet) with 1600m and 2200m chutes, and the inner oval (内回り, uchimawari) measures 1667m (1 mile + 189 feet) with a 1400m chute. Races can be run on the "A Course" rail setting (on the hedge), the "B Course" setting (rail out 3 meters), or the "C Course" setting (rail out 7 meters).

1000m, 1400m, 1800m, 2000m, 2500m and 3600m races run on the inner oval, while 1200m, 1600m, 2200m, 2600m and 4000m races run on the outer oval. 3200m races run on the outer oval first, then the inner oval.

The dirt course measures 1493 meters (7/8 mile + 278 feet), with a 1200m chute.

The jump course is unique because several different configurations can be used. In all races, horses must drop and climb over steep embankments at the rear of the course. One configuration contains the two most difficult jumps on the course, and is used only a few times a year, particularly for the Nakayama Grand Jump and Nakayama Daishogai races.

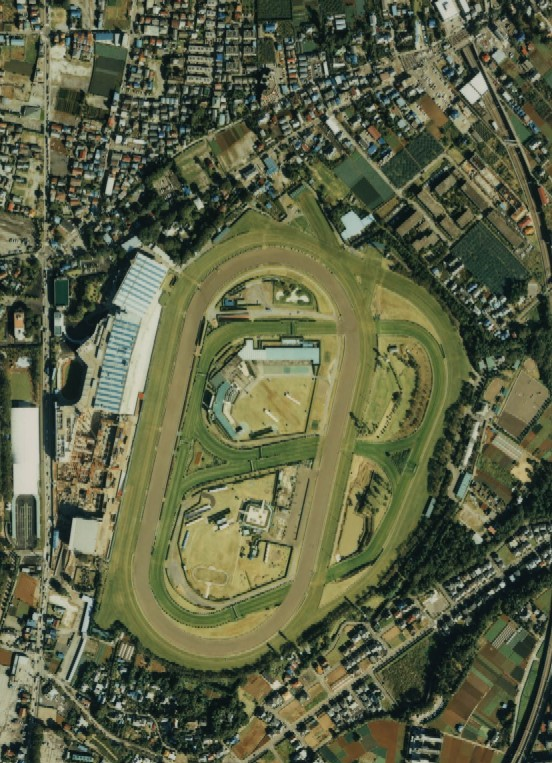
Nakayama Racecourse in 1989

== Notable races ==
Month	Race	Distance	Age/Sex
Grade I
Apr.	Satsuki Sho (Japanese 2,000 Guineas)	Turf 2000m	3yo c&f
Sep. / Oct.	Sprinters Stakes	Turf 1200m	3yo +
Dec.	Arima Kinen (Grand Prix)	Turf 2500m	3yo +
Dec.	Hopeful Stakes	Turf 2000m	2yo c&f
Grade II
Jan.	American Jockey Club Cup	Turf 2200m	4yo +
Feb. / Mar.	Nakayama Kinen	Turf 1800m	4yo +
Mar.	Yayoi Sho (Satsuki Sho Trial)	Turf 2000m	3yo
Mar.	Spring Stakes (Satsuki Sho Trial)	Turf 1800m	3yo c&f
Mar.	Nikkei Sho (Tenno Sho Trial)	Turf 2500m	4yo +
Apr.	New Zealand Trophy (NHK Mile Cup Trial)	Turf 1600m	3yo c&f
Sep.	Shion Stakes (Shuka Sho Trial)	Turf 2000m	3yo f
Sep.	St. Lite Kinen (Kikuka Sho Trial)	Turf 2200m	3yo
Sep.	All Comers (Tenno Sho Trial)	Turf 2200m	3yo +
Dec.	Stayers Stakes	Turf 3600m	3yo +
Grade III
Jan.	Nakayama Kimpai (Handicap)	Turf 2000m	4yo +
Jan.	Fairy Stakes	Turf 1600m	3yo f
Mar.	Ocean Stakes (Takamatsunomiya Kinen Trial)	Turf 1200m	4yo +
Mar.	Flower Cup	Turf 1800m	3yo f
Mar.	Nakayama Himba Stakes (Handicap)	Turf 1800m	4yo+ f
Mar.	March Stakes (Handicap)	Dirt 1800m	4yo +
Apr.	Lord Derby Challenge Trophy (Handicap)	Turf 1600m	4yo +
Sep.	Keisei Hai Autumn Handicap (Handicap)	Turf 1600m	3yo +
Dec.	Turquoise Stakes (Handicap)	Turf 1600m	3yo+ f
Dec.	Capella Stakes	Dirt 1200m	3yo +
J-Grade I (Steeplechase)
Apr.	Nakayama Grand Jump	Turf 4250m	4yo +
Dec.	Nakayama Daishogai	Turf 4100m	3yo +

== Track records ==
Source：レコードタイム表 (Record time table) -> 中山競馬場 (Nakayama Racecourse)

- † Reference Time.
- Last updated on October 15, 2026.

=== Turf course (2yo) ===
Distance	Time	Racehorse	Sex	Weight	Jockey	Date Recorded
1200m	1:07.2	Ecoro Sieg	Colt	55 kg	Christophe Lemaire	September 21, 2024
1400m	1:23.4	Hisano Maya	Filly	53 kg	Sueo Masuzawa	November 30, 1991
1600m	1:32.4	Denkmal	Colt	56 kg	Christophe Lemaire	December 14, 2024
1800m	1:46.4	Miyaji Taiga	Colt	54 kg	Ryuji Wada	September 8, 2012
2000m	1:58.2	Sanono Greater	Colt	56 kg	Takeshi Yokoyama	December 6, 2025

=== Turf course (3yo+) ===
Distance	Time	Racehorse	Sex	Weight	Jockey	Date Recorded
1200m	1:06.7	Lord Kanaloa	Horse 4	57 kg	Yasunari Iwata	September 30, 2012
1400m	1:23.2	Lindo UFO	Colt 3	55 kg	Sueo Masuzawa	April 11, 1987
1600m	1:30.3	Trois Etoiles	Mare 4	52 kg	Norihiro Yokoyama	September 8, 2019
1800m	1:44.8	Sixpence	Horse 4	58kg	Christophe Lemaire	March 7, 2025
2000m	1:56.5	Lovcen	Colt 3	57kg	Kohei Matsuyama	April 19th, 2026
2200m	2:10.1	Cosmo Bulk	Colt 3	56 kg	Fuyuki Igarashi	September 19, 2004
2500m	2:29.5	Zenno Rob Roy	Horse 4	57 kg	Olivier Peslier	December 26, 2004
2600m	2:40.3	Kikuno Flash	Horse 4	56 kg	Masamitsu Tamura	December 2, 1984
3200m	3:19.3	Kiri Spurt	Mare 5	54 kg	Yukio Okabe	April 3, 1993
3600m	3:41.6	Air Dublin	Colt 3	57.5 kg	Yukio Okabe	December 10, 1994

=== Dirt course (2yo) ===
Distance	Time	Racehorse	Sex	Weight	Jockey	Date Recorded
1000m	59.4	Sunny Shaver	Colt	53 kg	Naohiro Onishi	September 26, 1998
1200m	1:10.2	I Am Ruby	Filly	54 kg	Masami Matsuoka	December 6, 2009
1800m	1:50.0	Winter Breeze	Colt	55 kg	Christophe Lemaire	September 20, 2026

=== Dirt course (3yo+) ===
Distance	Time	Racehorse	Sex	Weight	Jockey	Date Recorded
1000m	58.4	Nishino Green	Filly 3	52 kg	Shigekatsu Moriyasu	July 1, 1978
1200m	1:08.4	Hakodate Busho	Horse 4	56 kg	Yukito Ishikawa	September 24, 2022
1700m	1:43.1	Erfolg	Horse 4	53 kg	Kazumi Iijima	June 27, 1976
1800m	1:48.5	Kiyo Hidaka	Horse 5	57 kg	Hiroyuki Gohara	January 6, 1983
2400m	2:28.8	Peach Shadai	Horse 6	56 kg	Tomio Yasuda	January 6, 1983
2500m	2:38.6	Satono Top Gun	Colt 3	55 kg	Hiroyuki Uchida	December 12, 2009
