= Saint Lite =

Japanese-bred Thoroughbred racehorse

Saint Lite セントライト
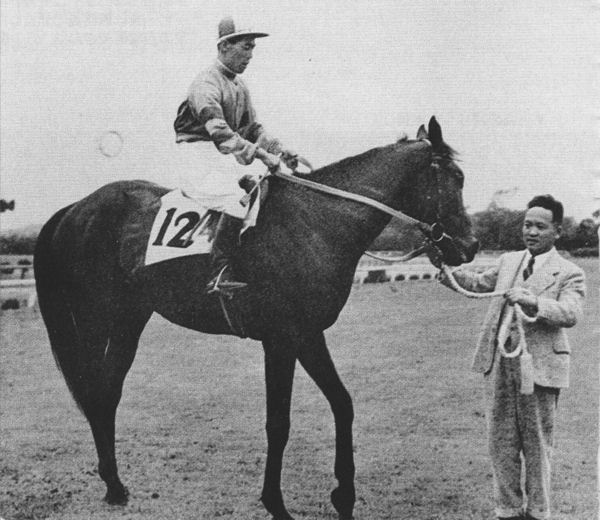
- Saint Lite with his jockey Kizo Konishi and owner Yusaku Kato at the 1941 Tokyo Yushun.
- Breed: Thoroughbred
- Sire: Diolite
- Grandsire: Diophon
- Dam: Flippancy
- Damsire: Flamboyant
- Sex: Stallion
- Foaled: April 2, 1938
- Died: February 15, 1965 (aged 26)
- Country: Japan
- Colour: Dark Bay
- Breeder: Koiwai Nojo
- Owner: Yusaku Kato
- Trainer: Waichiro Tanaka
- Jockey: Kizo Konishi
- Record: 12:9-2-1
- Earnings: ¥87,400

Major wins
- Japanese Classic Race wins: Tokyo Yushun (1941); Yokohama Nosho (1941); Kyoto Nosho (1941)

Awards
- 1st Japanese Triple Crown Champion (1941)

Honours
- Japan Racing Association Hall of Fame (1984); St Lite Kinen at Nakayama Racecourse

Saint Lite (Japanese: セントライト, Hepburn: Sento Raito; April 2, 1938 – February 1, 1965), also known as St. Lite, was a Japanese racehorse and sire. In 1941, he became the first horse in Japanese racing history to win the Triple Crown. As a stallion, he sired three winners of the eight major races: Owens, Oh Lite, and Saint O. Saint Lite was selected for the then-recently established Japan Racing Association Hall of Fame in 1984.

== Background ==
Saint Lite was foaled on April 2, 1938, at Koiwai Nojo, which was operated by Mitsubishi. His sire was Diolite, the winner of the 2000 Guineas Stakes and the first British classic winner to be imported to Japan. His dam, Flippancy, a daughter of Flamboyant, was also imported from Britain. In 1940, Saint Lite was offered at the Koiwai Nojo auction and was purchased by Yusaku Kato, president of the publishing company Hihankaku, for 32,200 yen (or 12,200 yen, according to some sources). In September of that year, he was stabled with Kazuichiro Tanaka at Tokyo Racecourse, where he underwent training in preparation for his debut. Among his stablemates from the same intake was Brand Sole, another horse owned by Kato, which had fetched the highest price for a filly that year. According to Kizo Konishi, “Saint Lite seemed a bit sluggish, and everyone thought Brand Sole was the better horse.”

== Racing career ==
=== Satsuki Sho ===
On March 15, 1941, Saint Lite made his debut in a 1,700-meter turf race at Yokohama Racecourse. Although he was rated low as the seventh favorite in a field of 12, he secured his first victory by a margin of five lengths over the runner-up. At that time, the win payout was capped at the statutory maximum of 200 yen, and even those who did not win their bets received a special payout of 7 yen 50 sen. Two weeks later, on the 30th of the same month, he competed in his first Classic race, the Yokohama Norinsho Shoten Yonsai Yobiuma (later renamed the Satsuki Sho). He was favored as the top choice, edging out Minami Mor, the highest-priced horse of his generation and went on to win the race by a margin of three lengths over that horse. Konishi reportedly expressed great surprise at having defeated Minami Moa, stating, “It was at that moment that I truly realized how strong he was.” The following year, his younger brother, Arubaitto (later renamed Kurihikari), won this race, achieving back-to-back victories by brothers. In 1949, Tosamidori also won the same race, establishing the only record in history of three brothers winning the same Classic race.

Prior to their debuts, the plan was to run Brand Sole who had matured early from Yokohama, while Saint Lite was scheduled to make his debut at the April Nakayama meet. However, because Saint Lite had outperformed Brand Sole during training at the end of February, and due to Kato’s strong insistence, Saint Lite was entered first. Konishi remarked that this was “fateful,” noting that if things had gone according to the stable’s original plan, Saint Light would not have had the opportunity to run in the Yokohama Ministry of Agriculture and Forestry Stakes for four-year-old colts.

Saint Lite subsequently won two consecutive races at Nakayama Racecourse. In a handicap race at Tokyo Racecourse, he carried a weight of 58 kg and finished second by a head, suffering his first defeat. However, in the Koko-uma Race, which he entered as a warm-up for the Tokyo Yushun, he defeated the 5-year-old horse Estates, who would go on to win that fall’s Imperial Prize (the predecessor to the Tenno Sho (Autumn)) to claim victory.

=== Tokyo Yushun ===
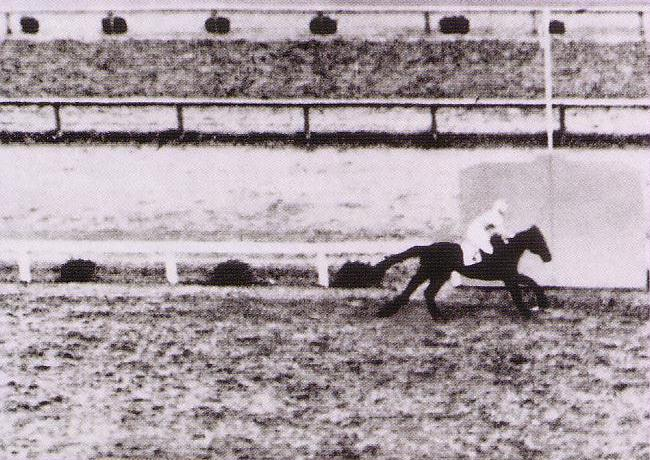
Saint Lite racing at the 1941 Tōkyō Yūshun (Japanese Derby).

In a contribution to the Yushun magazine, Konishi stated, “It may sound presumptuous to put it this way, but Saint Light’s victory in the Tokyo Yushun was, in fact, a walk in the park.” The Tokyo Yushun on May 16 was run on a heavy track due to rain that had fallen the night before. Saint Lite was the second favorite, behind Minami More, whom he had defeated in Yokohama while Brand Sole, who had won the Nakayama Four-Year-Old Fillies’ Special (later known as the Oka Sho), was the third favorite. During the race, St. Light ran in third place for most of the way, then took the lead at the final turn with Konishi keeping a firm grip on the reins. Furthermore, she kicked into high gear around the 200-meter mark, quickly pulling away from the field and winning by a commanding margin of eight lengths over the runner-up, States. This margin tied the record set by the 1955 winner, Otokitsu, and remains the largest margin of victory in Derby history. Commenting on this dominant victory, Konishi acknowledged, “There’s no doubt that the soft going played a part,” but added that if the race had been held under clear skies on a firm track, “we would have shaved at least one second off the record.” This was Konishi’s first Derby victory, while for trainer Tanaka and owner Kato, it marked their second Derby win, following their victory with Kumohata in 1939.

=== Kikuka Sho ===
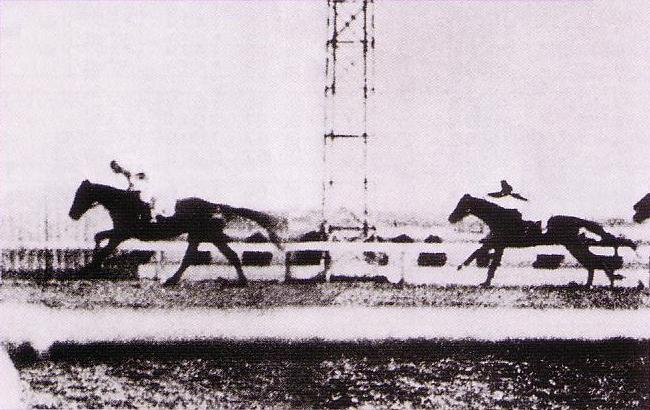
Saint Lite racing in the 1941 Kyoto Norinsho Shoten Yonsai Yobiuma (Kikuka-shō).

After the Tokyo Yushun, Saint Lite entered a rest period, setting his sights on becoming the first horse in Japanese racing history to win the Triple Crown that fall. In his return race on September 27, he was assigned a weight of 66 kg, 11 kg heavier than States, who had finished second in the Tokyo Yushun and finished third. However, in the subsequent Koko-uma Stakes, carrying the same weight, he defeated States once again, the horse he had beaten in the spring. The following week, after winning the Yokohama Ministry of Agriculture and Forestry Trophy for 4-and 5-Year-Old Horses, a special race (later designated a graded stakes race), he traveled west to prepare for the final leg of the Triple Crown, the Kyoto Norinsho Shoten Yonsai Yobiuma (later known as the Kikuka Sho). In the Koko-uma race, which served as a warm-up, he was forced to compete just four days after arriving in Kyoto and carrying 68 kg, finished second by two lengths (in a three-horse field) to the local favorite Kokucho who was carrying 60 kg. However, this warm-up race improved his form, and he entered the Kyoto Ministry of Agriculture and Forestry Trophy for Four-Year-Olds on October 26 in top condition.

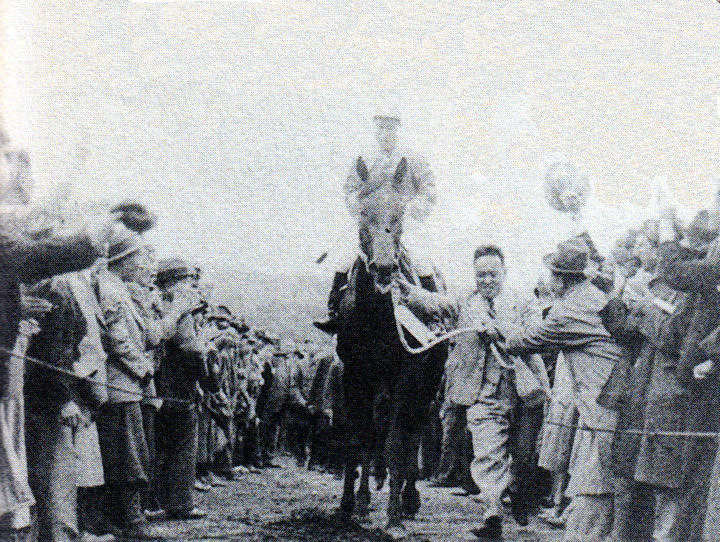
Saint Lite parading through the crowd after winning the Triple Crown.

Apart from Saint Lite, the field consisted of only six horses in total, including Minami Mor and States, who had traveled from the Kanto region and Tetsu Banzai, the winner of the Hanshin Yushun Mare Stakes (Yushun Himba). As a result, Saint Lite was the clear favorite. In the race, he ran in second place from the start and won by two and a half lengths over Minami Moa at the finish line. This marked the first time the Triple Crown had been achieved in the four years since the series of races was established in 1939. However, because the concept of the Triple Crown was not yet widely understood at the time, media coverage was far more limited than it had been following his Derby victory. It is believed that the tension in the country at the time, as it moved from the Second Sino-Japanese War toward the Pacific War was also a contributing factor. Furthermore, the 2,700 yen in prize money (Konishi’s share) that Konishi received for winning all three Triple Crown races was paid not in cash but in 10-year government bonds, reflecting the circumstances of the time; these bonds reportedly became worthless with Japan’s defeat in the war.

Afterward, with the Imperial Prize as his target, Saint Lite was scheduled to run in a handicap race at Nakayama Racecourse. However, when it became clear that he would be required to carry a weight of 72 kg in that race, owner Kato declared, “If a four-year-old horse has to carry as much as 72 kg,” and retired Saint Lite without any hesitation regarding the Imperial Prize. His career record stood at 9 wins in 12 starts. Kato had also retired Kumohata without allowing him another shot at the Imperial Prize after the horse finished second in that race; Kato’s mentor in horse racing, the writer Kan Kikuchi, praised him, saying, “If his intention were to earn prize money, he could have kept the horse racing while it was still capable, yet he retired him without a second thought. That kind of attitude is truly admirable. Perhaps even the greatest racehorses in the world can only fulfill their destinies when recognized by someone like him.” About three and a half years later, on May 25, 1945, Kato was caught in the damage caused by an American air raid on Tokyo and died the following day.

== Retirement ==
After retiring from racing, Saint Lite returned to Koiwai Nojo to become a stallion. Following World War II, in 1947, Owens won the Tenno Sho (Spring) (the successor to the Imperial Prize), which had been revived as the “Peace Prize.” However, after the war, Mitsubishi was dissolved by the occupying Supreme Commander for the Allied Powers, and Koiwai Nojo was prohibited from breeding Thoroughbreds; consequently, Saint Light was transferred to the Iwate Livestock Experiment Station in 1949. Subsequently, Oh Lite won the Tenno Sho (Autumn) in 1951, and in 1952, Saint O achieved a father-son double victory in the Kikuka Sho. However, after leaving Koiwai Nojo, the quality of Saint Lite’s breeding partners declined significantly including the use of Arabians and crossbreeds, and he produced no notable racehorses in his later years. He was eighth on the sires list in 1950 and 1952 and ninth in 1951. In total, Saint Lite's progeny won 253 races worth 32,207,750 yen. As a broodmare sire, his progeny included Tokino Kiroku, the winner of the 1960 Oka Sho whoses descendeants included Linear Queen, winner of the 1977 Yushun Himba. Sweep Tosho, winner of the 2004 Shuka Sho, and 2005 Takarazuka Kinen and Queen Elizabeth II Cup was a distant descendent of Saint Lite through his daughter Tomiyuki. On February 1, 1965, he died of decrepitude, occurring only a few months after Shinzan became the second Triple Crown winner in history.

== In popular culture ==
An anthropomorphized version of the horse appears as a character in Umamusume: Pretty Derby, voiced by Mamiko Noto.

== Legacy ==
The St Lite Kinen, a graded stakes race established in 1947, was named after him. In 1984, he was selected for the Japan Racing Association Hall of Fame, receiving multiple honors just like Shinzan and his stablemate Tokino Minoru.

== Racing form ==
Date	Age	Racecourse	Race	Grade	Distance	Gate	Odds	Fav.	Fin.	Time	Margin	Jockey	Winner (Runner-Up)
Mar 15, 1941	3	Yokohama	Newcomer Race	Maiden	T 1700m			7	1st	1:53.0		Kizo Konishi	(Ootomo)
Mar 30, 1941	3	Yokohama	Yokohama Norinsho Shoten Yonsai Yobiuma (Satsuki Sho)		T 1850m	5		1	1st	1:59.1		Kizo Konishi	(Minami Mor)
Apr 5, 1941	3	Nakayama	Four-Year-Olds		T 2000m	1		1	1st	2:12.4		Kizo Konishi	(Kamiwaka)
Apr 27, 1941	3	Nakayama	Four-Year-Old Winners		T 2200m	4		1	1st	2:23.2		S.Abe	(Fuasutoraito)
May 3, 1941	3	Tokyo	Four-Year-Olds and Up Tokushu Handicap		T 2300m	5		3	2nd		0.0	Kizo Konishi	Shijiridake
May 10, 1941	3	Tokyo	Four-Year-Olds and Up		T 2300m	2		1	1st	2:27.3	0.0	Kizo Konishi	(Estates)
May 18, 1941	3	Tokyo	Tokyo Yushun (Japanese Derby)	OP	T 2400m			2	1st	2.40.1		Kizo Konishi	(States)
Sep 27, 1941	3	Yokohama	Four-Year-Olds and Up Tokushu Handicap		T 2200m			2	3rd			Kizo Konishi	States
Oct 5, 1941	3	Yokohama	Four-Year-Olds and Up		T 2200m	3		2	1st	2:30.3		Kizo Konishi	(Estates)
Oct 12, 1941	3	Yokohama	Yokohama Norinsho Shoten 4-5-Year-Old Yobiuma		T 2800m	1		1	1st	3:08.0	0.0	Kizo Konishi	(Miss Minami)
Oct 18, 1941	3	Kyoto	Four-Year-Olds and Up		T 2400m	1		1	2nd			Kizo Konishi	Kokucho
Oct 26, 1941	3	Kyoto	Kyoto Norinsho Shoten Yonsai Yobiuma (Kikuka Sho)		T 3000m	2		1	1st	3:22.3		Kizo Konishi	(Minami Mor)

== Pedigree ==
Pedigree of Saint Lite
Sire Diolite (GB)	Diophon	Grand Parade	Orby
Sire Diolite (GB)	Diophon	Grand Parade	Grand Geraldine
Sire Diolite (GB)	Diophon	Donnetta	Donovan
Sire Diolite (GB)	Diophon	Donnetta	Rinovata
Sire Diolite (GB)	Needle Rock	Rock Sand	Sainfoin
Sire Diolite (GB)	Needle Rock	Rock Sand	Roquebrune
Sire Diolite (GB)	Needle Rock	Needlepoint	Isinglass
Sire Diolite (GB)	Needle Rock	Needlepoint	Etui
Dam Flippancy	Flamboyant	Tracery	Rock Sand
Dam Flippancy	Flamboyant	Tracery	Topiary
Dam Flippancy	Flamboyant	Simonath	St. Simon
Dam Flippancy	Flamboyant	Simonath	Philomath
Dam Flippancy	Slip	Robert Le Diable	Ayrshire
Dam Flippancy	Slip	Robert Le Diable	Rose Bay
Dam Flippancy	Slip	Snip	Donovan
Dam Flippancy	Slip	Snip	Isabel (F-No.22-b)

== See also ==
- Shinzan (Japanese Triple crown in 1964)
- Mr. C.B. (Japanese Triple crown in 1983)
- Symboli Rudolf (Japanese first undefeated Triple crown in 1984)
- Narita Brian (Japanese Triple crown in 1994)
- Deep Impact (Japanese undefeated Triple crown in 2005)
- Orfevre (Japanese Triple crown in 2011)
- Contrail (Japanese undefeated Triple crown in 2020)
- List of racehorses
