= Triple Crown of Thoroughbred Racing (Japan) =

Japanese three-race Thoroughbred series

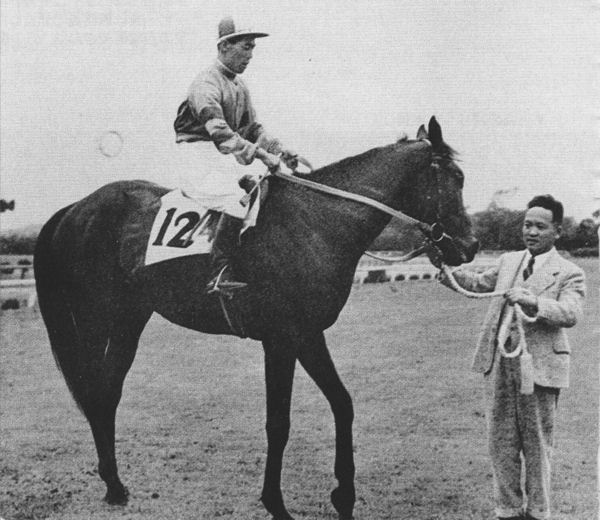
Saint Lite, the first Classic Triple Crown winner

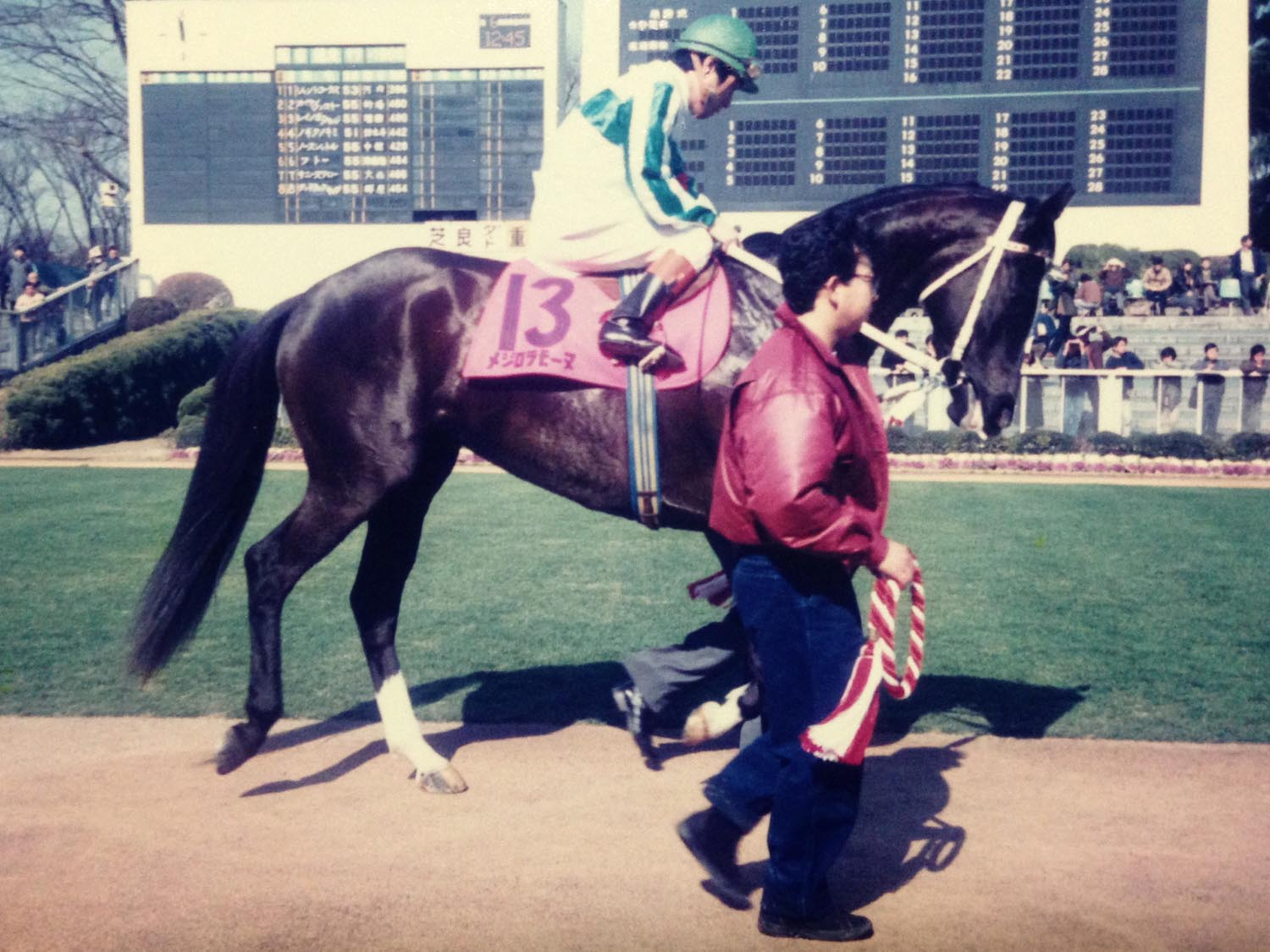
Mejiro Ramonu, the first Triple Tiara winner

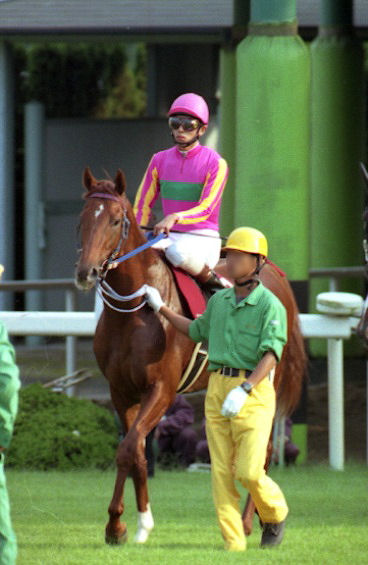
T. M. Opera O, the first Autumn Triple Crown winner

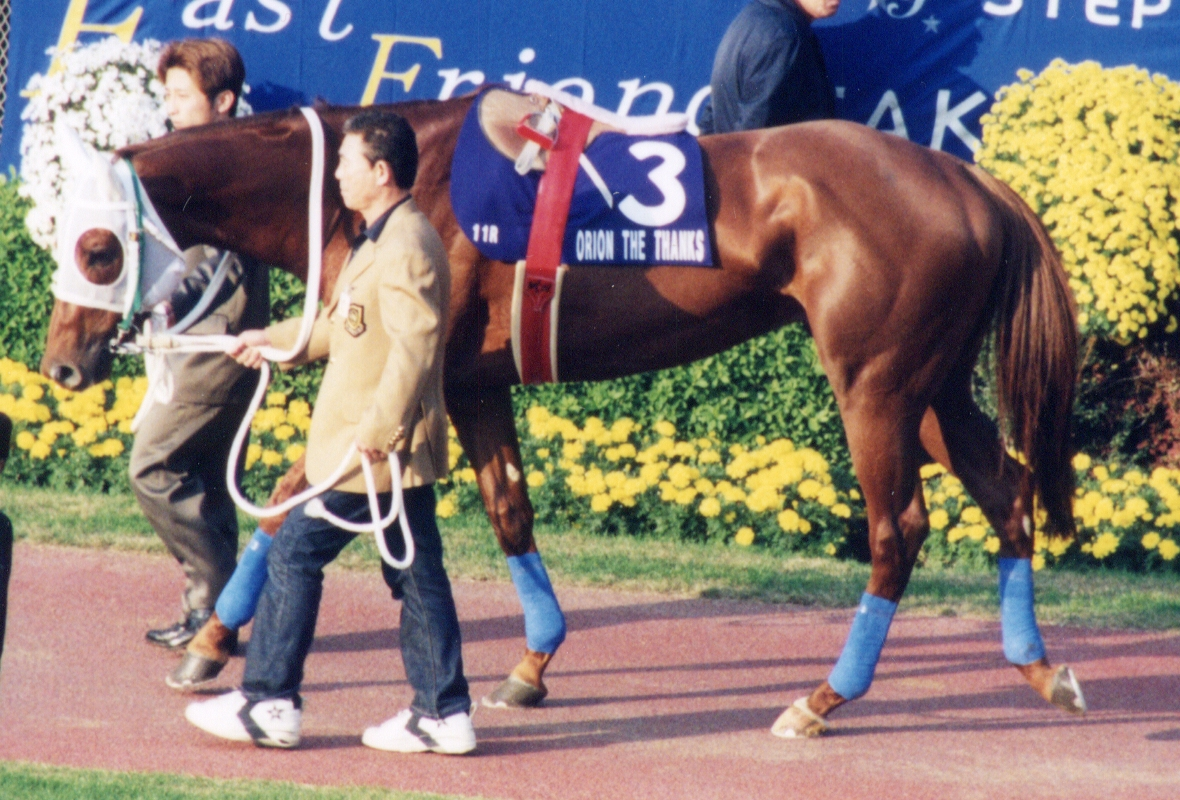
Orion the Thanks, the first horse to win all three Dirt Triple Crown legs (pre-establishment; not officially recognised as a Triple Crown winner)

In Japanese horseracing, the Triple Crown of Thoroughbred Racing (also known as the Triple Crown (Note: sankan (Japanese: 三冠; lit. 'three crowns') or simply toripōrukuraun (Japanese: トリポールクラウン; lit. 'triple crown'))) can refer to one of five national-level titles, each a series of three races run within a single year.

The Japan Racing Association (JRA) officially recognises the Classic Triple Crown, consisting of the Satsuki Shō, Tōkyō Yūshun and Kikuka-shō, and the Triple Tiara, consisting of the Oka Shō, Yushun Himba, and Shūka Shō. Since 2024, the National Association of Racing (NAR) also recognises the Dirt Triple Crown, comprising the Haneda Hai, Tokyo Derby, and Japan Dirt Classic.

All three series are composed of Group 1 (GI) races that are limited to three-year-old horses. Additionally, the JRA also offers prize bonuses to any horse that can win the trifecta of the Osaka Hai, Tennō Shō (Spring) and Takarazuka Kinen, or the trio of the Tennō Shō (Autumn), Japan Cup and Arima Kinen, in a single season. While the JRA does not officially designate these bonuses by specific names, they are commonly referred to by media as the Spring and Autumn Triple Crowns respectively.

As with any Triple Crown set, winning any of these five series is considered one of the most difficult achievements for a horse, and comes with both a significant bonus prize and prestige. Many of the horses that have completed a Crown set have subsequently been named the Japanese Horse of the Year or entered into the JRA Hall of Fame. Seventeen horses have won a Triple Crown title; eight have won the Classic Triple Crown, seven have won the Triple Tiara, and two have won the Autumn Triple Crown. No horse has yet completed either the Dirt Triple Crown or Spring Triple Crown.

== Classic Triple Crown ==
The Classic Triple Crown title is bestowed on any horse that wins the Satsuki Shō, Tōkyō Yūshun and Kikuka-shō, alternatively known as the Japanese 2000 Guineas, Japanese Derby, and the Japanese St. Leger. The three races are part of Japan's Classic Races, meaning only three-year horses can enter each leg. Thus, every horse only has one chance at winning the Triple Crown. Since 2023, any horse that wins all three races receives a prize of ¥300,000,000.

Modeled directly after the English Triple Crown's format, the Classic Crown is the oldest of the five Crowns, with each of its legs established in the 1930s. The forms of the original races were different to their current state. The Satsuki Shō was originally called Yokohama Norinsho Shoten Yonsai Yobiuma (the Yokohama Ministry of Agriculture and Forestry Prize for Four-Year-Olds) and ran at Yokohama Racecourse over 1,850 meters, while the Kikuka-shō was known as the Kyoto Norin-sho Shoten Yonsai Yobiuma Kyoso (the Kyoto Agriculture and Forestry Ministry Prize Invitational for Four-Year-Olds) until 1948. Despite the races' names, all horses entered were chronologically three years old; until 2001, Japanese horseracing used the kazoedoshi counting system where horses are considered one at birth and become one year older each New Year. Saint Lite was the only horse to achieve the Classic Triple Crown before the Satsuki Shō's relocation to Nakayama Racecourse.

With the races varying greatly in length and held in different racecourses, a horse of multiple aptitudes is required to win all three. A common proverb about the three races goes that the Satsuki Shō crowns the fastest horse, the Tōkyō Yūshun rewards the luckiest horse, and the Kikuka-shō is the race won by the strongest horse. All horses that have achieved the Triple Crown have been inducted into the JRA's Hall of Fame, and, with the exception of Saint Lite, won their year's Best Three-Year-Old Colt award. (Note: The awards were organised by the race magazines Keishū Sha between 1954 and 1971, and Yushun between 1972 to 1986. Since then, they have been organised by the JRA. No equivalent existed when Saint Lite was active.)

Horses that win two legs of the Triple Crown are often referred to as Double Crown (or Dual Crown) horses. Of these, Air Shakur is considered the horse closest to achieving the Classic Triple Crown, having won the 2000 Satsuki Shō and Kikuka-shō but losing the Tōkyō Yūshun to Agnes Flight by just 7 cm. Horses that were considered likely winners of the Triple Crown but had to withdraw from racing before running all three are often referred to as 'phantom' Triple Crown winners by Japanese media. Two such examples are Fuji Kiseki and Agnes Tachyon; both horses were undefeated in their first year of racing and were favourites to win all three of the Crown's legs (and in Agnes Tachyon's case, won the Satsuki Shō), but had to prematurely retire after being diagnosed with tendonitis. Additionally, Kurifuji, an undefeated Thoroughbred racemare in the mid-1940s, is occasionally referred to as an unofficial Triple Crown winner, as she won the unusual combination of the Tōkyō Yūshun, Yūshun Himba and Kikuka-shō in 1943.

=== Classic Triple Crown Races ===
The individual legs of the Classic Triple Crown
	Satsuki Shō	Tōkyō Yūshun	Kikuka-shō
British Equivalent	2000 Guineas Stakes	The Derby	St Leger Stakes
Month	April	May	October
Distance	2,000m	2,400m	3,000m
Track	Nakayama Racecourse	Tokyo Racecourse	Kyoto Racecourse
Qualification	3yo, colts and fillies, no geldings		
Inauguration	29 April 1939	24 April 1932	11 December 1938
GI race since	1984		
Ref			

== Triple Tiara ==
The Fillies Triple Crown, commonly referred to as the Triple Tiara, is the fillies' equivalent of the Classic Triple Crown, consisting of the Oka Shō, Yūshun Himba and Shūka Shō. Since 2023, any filly that wins all three races receives a prize of ¥100,000,000.

In contrast to the Classic Triple Crown, the final leg of the Triple Tiara was not firmly established until the 1990s. Before 1970, there was no official Triple Tiara, although fillies that won the Oka Sho and Yūshun Himba would often chose to run the Kikuka-shō, mirroring the English Triple Tiara equivalent of the 1000 Guineas Stakes, Epsom Oaks and St. Leger Stakes. In 1970, the Victoria Cup was inaugurated and chosen to be an official third race, but it was discontinued and re-organised into the Queen Elizabeth II Cup in 1976. This new Cup served as the Tiara's last leg until 1996, whereupon it was replaced by the new Shūka Shō after the Cup eased entry restrictions to allow mares older than three to enter. Of the six races that comprise the JRA's official Triple Crowns, the Shūka Shō is the only one not considered part of the Classic races.

Unlike the Classic Triple Crown, the Triple Tiara's legs do not increase in length with each race, and the Yūshun Himba's 2,400m falls far short of the Kikuka-shō's 3,000m. While no less prestigious than the Classic Triple Crown, the Tiara's shorter distances have led to more frequent winners of the Tiara, with three occurring between 2018 and 2023, and assertions that the Tiara is easier to achieve. Not every Tiara winner has entered the JRA Hall of Fame, but they were all awarded their year's Best Three-Year-Old Filly award.

=== Triple Tiara races ===
The individual legs of the Triple Tiara
	Oka Shō	Yūshun Himba	Shūka Shō (current third leg)	Victoria Cup (former third leg, 1970–1975)	Queen Elizabeth II Cup (former third leg, 1976–1995)
British equivalent	1000 Guineas Stakes	The Oaks	None		
Month	April	May	October	Discontinued	November
Distance	1,600m	2,400m	2,000m	2,400m	2,200m
Track	Hanshin Racecourse	Tokyo Racecourse	Kyoto Racecourse		
Qualification	3yo fillies and mares				3yo and up, fillies and mares (Note: Current restriction, limited to 3yo fillies and mares when still part of the Triple Tiara)
Inauguration	29 April 1939	23 November 1938	20 October 1996	22 November 1970	21 November 1976
GI race since	1984		1996	N/A	1984
Ref					

== Dirt Triple Crown ==
First announced in 2022 and formally established beginning with the 2024 season, the Dirt Triple Crown comprises the Haneda Hai, the Tokyo Derby, and the Japan Dirt Classic (JDC). Since the Crown's creation, any horse that wins all three races receives a prize of ¥80,000,000.

Unlike the other Crowns, the Dirt Triple Crown is overseen by the National Association of Racing (NAR), who usually oversee regional level racing as compared to the JRA's national focus. The three races were previously known collectively as the South Kanto Triple Crown, a regional series which only horses of the region could complete, as both the Haneda Hai and Tokyo Derby were restricted to South Kanto horses. However, as the NAR wished to create more opportunities for dirt specialists, the three races were re-organised to encourage wider participation. The Haneda Hai and the Tokyo Derby were promoted to Group 1 status and opened to all horses in the country, matching the JDC. The JDC itself was renamed from the Japan Dirt Derby and moved from July to October. All three races had their prize money substantially increased. While the NAR oversees the three races, JRA horses are allowed to enter all three legs.

Although three horses completed the South Kanto Triple Crown before 2024, most recently Mick Fire in 2023, they are not recognised as winners of the current Dirt Triple Crown. No horse has won the Crown since the title's inception.

=== Dirt Triple Crown Races ===
The individual legs of the Dirt Triple Crown
	Haneda Hai	Tokyo Derby	Japan Dirt Classic
Month	April	June	October
Distance	1,800m	2,000m	
Track	Oi Racecourse		
Qualification	3yo, no geldings		
Inauguration	18 April 1956	15 May 1955	8 July 1999
GI race since	2024		1999
Ref			

== Autumn Triple Crown ==
In 2000, the JRA established a bonus prize for any horse that won the Tennō Shō (Autumn), Japan Cup and Arima Kinen in the same year. While the bonus has no official name or trophy associated with it, reporters have referred to completing this act as both the "Autumn Triple Crown" and "Senior Autumn Triple Crown", the later in reference to the three races being open to any horse three years old and older. As each race allows horses to enter in multiple years, a horse could theoretically win the Crown more than once. However, the Autumn Crown cannot by achieved by winning the three legs over multiple years. For example, Kitasan Black won the 2016 Japan Cup and the 2017 Tennō Shō (Autumn) and Arima Kinen, but is not considered an Autumn Crown winner. Since 2025, the reward for winning the Crown has been ¥300,000,000 for Japanese horses and ¥150,000,000 for foreign horses, and an additional incentive where any horse that wins any three of the six races in the Spring and Autumn Triple Crowns will receive an additional ¥200,000,000 or ¥100,000,000, depending on their nationality.

Although there have been several Double Crown winners since the Crown's establishment, only two horses have achieved the Autumn Triple Crown since its inception, T. M. Opera O and Zenno Rob Roy. This has been attributed to the short turnabout between races, with less than a month between each race. Both horses were four years old at the time of their achievement, and won their year's Best Older Male Horse award.

=== Autumn Triple Crown Races ===
The individual legs of the Autumn Triple Crown
	Tennō Shō (Autumn)	Japan Cup	Arima Kinen
Month	Late October/Early November	Late November	December
Distance	2,000m	2,400m	2,500m
Track	Tokyo Racecourse		Nakayama Racecourse
Qualification	3yo and older		
Inauguration	3 December 1937	22 November 1981	23 December 1956
GI race since	1984		
Ref			

== Spring Triple Crown ==
After the Ōsaka Hai was promoted to Group 1 status in 2017 to strengthen the Spring racing program, the JRA established a bonus prize for any horse that won the Ōsaka Hai, the Tennō Shō (Spring) and the Takarazuka Kinen. Being similar to the Autumn Triple Crown's format, this bonus is commonly referred to as the (Senior) Spring Triple Crown. The Spring Crown shares the same reward for achieving it as the Autumn Crown; ¥300,000,000 for Japanese horses and ¥150,000,000 for foreign horses.

No horse has won the Crown since the title's inception. Kitasan Black was the first Double Champion in 2017, winning the Ōsaka Hai and the Tennō Shō (Spring) but failed to win the Takarazuka Kinen, placing 9th. His son, Croix du Nord, won the Crown's first two legs in 2026, but he lost in the year's Takarazuka Kinen, though he came closer than his father did, placing 2nd by a neck. Additionally, when the Ōsaka Hai was still a Group 2 race, Super Creek, Meisho Samson and Hiruno d'Amour won the Ōsaka Hai and the Tennō Shō (Spring) in 1990, 2007 and 2011 respectively. (Note: Results for the Ōsaka Hai in 1990, 2007, 2011) Super Creek was unable to race in the 1990 Takarazuka Kinen due to a leg injury, while Meisho Samson finished second to Admire Moon in 2007. Hiruno d'Amour skipped the 2011 race to rest up for his autumn campaign.

=== Spring Triple Crown Races ===
The individual legs of the Spring Triple Crown
	Ōsaka Hai	Tennō Shō (Spring)	Takarazuka Kinen
Month	April	May	June
Distance	2,000m	3,200m	2,200m
Track	Hanshin Racecourse	Kyoto Racecourse	Hanshin Racecourse
Qualification	4yo and older		3yo and older
Inauguration	17 March 1957	15 May 1938	26 June 1960
GI race since	2017	1984	
Ref			

== Triple Crown Winners ==
=== Key ===
♦	Horse is a member of the Japan Racing Association Hall of Fame
★	Horse was undefeated at the time of winning their Triple Crown
▲	Horse also won the Japanese Horse of the Year award in the same year
■	Horse also won the Best Three-Year-Old Colt (or Filly) award in the same year
●	Horse also won the Best Older Male Horse award in the same year

=== Classic Triple Crown Winners ===
List of Japanese Triple Crown winners
Year	Portrait	Winner	Jockey	Trainer	Owner	Breeder	Ref
1941	Blurred monochromatic photo of a black horse running on race course.	Saint Lite^{♦}	Kizo Konishi	Waichiro Tanaka	Yusaku Kato	Koiwai Farm	
1964	Dark headshot photo of a black horse with a white star in a stable	Shinzan^{♦▲■}	Masaru Kurita	Bungo Takeda	Kokichi Hashimoto	Yoshimatsu Matsuhashi	
1983	Photo of a dark bay horse with very short mane mid gallop at a racecourse, wearing a cloth with number 1 on its side, ridden by a jockey in a white cap and a green shirt with yellow zig-zag	Mr. C. B.^{♦▲■}	Masato Yoshinaga	Yasuhisa Matsuyama	Chigira Bokujo	Chigira Bokujo	
1984	Bay horse with faint white crescent blaze on head and white sock on left hind leg, eating grass in a field	Symboli Rudolf^{♦★▲■}	Yukio Okabe	Yuji Nohira	Symboli Stud	Symboli Stud	
1994	Dark bay horse mid-race, with number 12 on his side and ridden by jockey in pink shirt and white trousers.	Narita Brian^{♦▲■}	Katsumi Minai	Masaaki Ōkubo	Hidenori Yamaji	Hayata Bokujo	
2005	Bay horse with white sock mid-race, with number 7 on his side and ridden by jockey in black-yellow shirt and white trousers	Deep Impact^{♦★▲■}	Yutaka Take	Yasuo Ikee	Makoto Kaneko	Northern Farm	
2011	Light bay horse mid-race, with number 12 on his side and ridden by jockey in black-red shirt and white trousers	Orfevre^{♦▲■}	Kenichi Ikezoe	Yasutoshi Ikee	Sunday Racing	Shadai Stallion Station	
2020	Black horse with white blaze walking near stadium, with number 2 on his side and ridden by jockey in cyan-red striped shirt and white trousers	Contrail^{♦★■}	Yuichi Fukunaga	Yoshito Yahagi	Shinji Maeda	North Hills	

=== Triple Tiara Winners ===
List of Japanese Triple Tiara winners
Year	Portrait	Winner	Jockey	Trainer	Owner	Breeder	Ref
1986	Dark brown horse being led near stadium, with number 13 on her side and ridden by jockey in green shirt and yellow trousers	Mejiro Ramonu^{♦■}	Hiroshi Kawachi	Shinji Okuhira	Mejiro Bokujo	Mejiro Bokujo	
2003	Bay horse with red-blue cross hood being led near stadium, with number 9 on her side and ridden by jockey in matching red-blue cross colours	Still in Love^{■}	Hideaki Miyuki	Shōichi Matsumoto	North Hills	Shimokobe Farm	
2010	Bayhorse with white stripe being led on racecourse, with number 15 on her side and a victory sash around her neck, ridden by jockey in matching black-yellow shirt and white trousers	Apapane^{■}	Masayoshi Ebina	Sakae Kunieda	Makoto Kaneko	Northern Farm	
2012	Brown horse with white star and wearing pink hat and blue coat, standing still at racecourse at nighttime, looking at camera	Gentildonna^{♦▲■}	Yasunari Iwata / Yuga Kawada	Sei Ishizaka	Sunday Racing	Northern Farm	
2018	Bay horse mid-race, with number 1 on his side and ridden by jockey in blue shirt with red spots and white trousers.	Almond Eye^{♦▲■}	Christophe Lemaire	Sakae Kunieda	Silk Racing	Northern Farm	
2020	Dark brown horse mid-race, with number 1 on his side and ridden by jockey in blue shirt with white wavey stripes and white trousers.	Daring Tact^{★■}	Kohei Matsuyama	Haruki Sugiyama	Normandy Thoroughbred Racing	Hasegawa Bokujo	
2023	Dark bay horse with white blaze mid-race, with number 9 on his side and ridden by jockey in black shirt with red cross and yellow striped sleeves and white trousers.	Liberty Island^{■}	Yuga Kawada	Mitsumasa Nakauchida	Sunday Racing	Northern Farm	

=== Dirt Triple Crown Winners ===
No horse has won the Dirt Triple Crown since its establishment.

=== Autumn Triple Crown Winners ===
List of Autumn Triple Crown winners
Year	Portrait	Winner	Jockey	Trainer	Owner	Breeder	Ref
2000	Chestnut horse with front-left sock mid-race, with a number 1 on his side, ridden by a jockey in pink with green stip shirt and white trousers	T. M. Opera O^{♦▲●}	Ryuji Wada	Ichizō Iwamoto	Masatsugu Takezono	Kineusu Bokujo	
2004	Black horse being walked in parade circle with number 13 on his side	Zenno Rob Roy^{▲●}	Olivier Peslier	Kazuo Fujisawa	Shinobu Osako	Shiraoi Farm	

=== Spring Triple Crown Winners ===
No horse has won the Spring Triple Crown since its establishment.
