= Shinzan =

Japanese-bred Thoroughbred racehorse

Shinzan シンザン
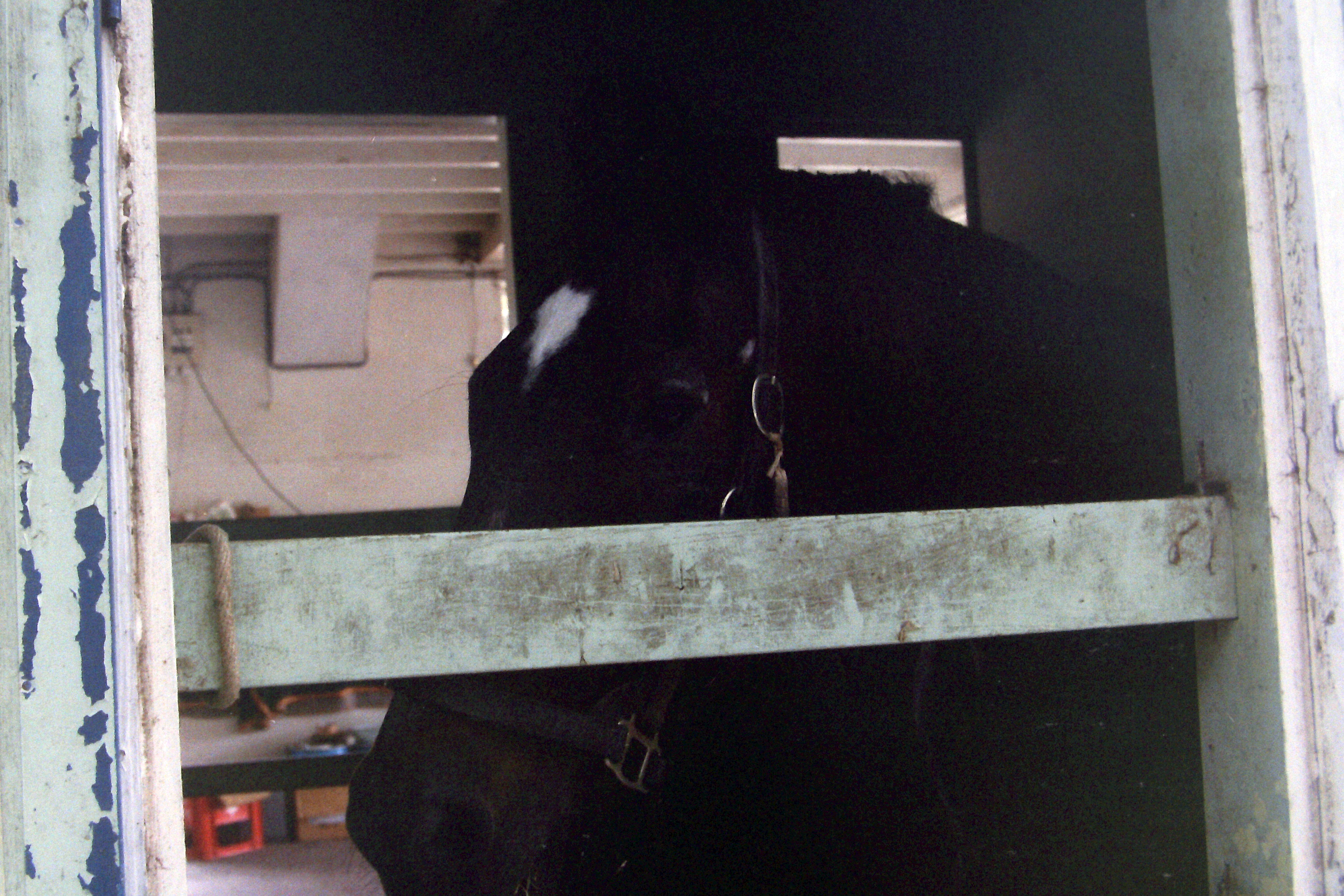
- Shinzan at Tanigawa Farm in 1994
- Breed: Thoroughbred
- Sire: Hindostan
- Grandsire: Bois Roussel
- Dam: Hayanobori
- Damsire: Hayatake
- Sex: Stallion
- Foaled: 2 April 1961
- Died: 13 July 1996 (aged 35)
- Country: Japan
- Colour: Bay
- Breeder: Yoshimatsu Matsuhashi
- Owner: Kokichi Hashimoto
- Racing colors
- Trainer: Bungo Takeda
- Jockey: Masaru Kurita
- Record: 19: 15-4-0
- Earnings: 60,219,700 JPY

Major wins
- Spring Stakes (1964); Takarazuka Kinen (1965); Meguro Kinen (Autumn) (1965); Tenno Sho (Autumn) (1965); Arima Kinen (1965); Japanese Classic Race wins: Satsuki Sho (1964); Tokyo Yushun (1964); Kikuka Sho (1964)

Awards
- 2nd Japanese Triple Crown Champion (1964); Japanese Champion Three-Year-Old Colt (1964); Japanese Horse of the Year (1964, 1965); Japanese Champion Older Colt or Horse (1965)

Honours
- Japan Racing Association Hall of Fame (1984); Statue at Kyoto Racecourse; Shinzan Kinen at Kyoto Racecourse

Shinzan (Japanese: シンザン, Hepburn: Shinzan; 2 April 1961 – 13 July 1996) was a Thoroughbred racehorse that won the Japanese Triple Crown. He is known for being only the second horse in Japanese racing history to do so. He was called "sharp as a hatchet" during his career, and continues to be referred to as a "divine horse."

Shinzan was generally considered to be the best Japanese racehorse of the post-war era and became the first horse to win all 5 contemporary big titles of Japan. He became the second horse to win the Japanese Triple Crown and was named Japanese Horse of the Year in 1964. Shinzan won the Arima Kinen, Takarazuka Kinen and Tenno Sho (Autumn) as a four-year-old, defending his Horse of the Year title. He became the subject of an ad campaign after his career, with the catchphrase "Surpass Shinzan" being coined in the decades before another horse, Mr. C. B., finally won the Triple Crown again.

== Background ==
Shinzan was a bay horse bred by Yoshimatsu Matsuhashi, and was foaled in Urakawa, Hokkaido on 2 April 1961. He was sired by Irish Derby winner Hindostan (horse). His dam, Hayanobori, was a great-granddaughter of the Irish mare Beautiful Dreamer who was imported to Japan in the 1930s and became extremely influential; her other descendants included the Japanese classic winners Kazuyoshi, Jitsu Homare, Hakuryo and Meiji Hikari.

== Racing career ==
=== 1963: two-year-old season ===
Shinzan took part in his maiden race in November 1963, a week later than originally planned because he would have competed against another colt of Hindostan, Umeno Chikara, who was highly anticipated at the time; Shinzan's trainer, Takeda, believed Shinzan wouldn't stand a chance against him.

=== 1964: three-year-old season ===
Despite winning four races in a row leading up to January, Takeda continued to have a relatively low opinion of the horse. Soon after those four consecutive wins, Shinzan was found bleeding from a hind leg after training one morning; the cause was found to be the horse working his hind legs so hard that they knocked against his front horseshoes. After a discussion with veterinarians and farriers, a special type of horseshoe was made for him to prevent these collisions. While it couldn't be used in official races, it helped break the horse in without fear of injury.

Shinzan contested the Spring Stakes on 29 March against a lineup of prominent racehorses, including Umeno Chikara and Tokino Parade (winner of the Keisei Hai and Yayoi Sho). Shinzan had not taken part in any races that served as direct stepping stones to the Classics, a fact reflected in being the sixth-favorite in the polls. Nevertheless, he sharply accelerated on the final straight to win by half a length. His trainer, Takeda, did not come to Tokyo to see the race, assuming it was hopeless; it's reported that he apologized directly to Shinzan for not recognizing the horse's potential.

Shinzan's next race was the Satsuki Shō, the first of the three Classic Triple Crown races and one of the big eight races in Japanese horse racing. It was held at Tokyo Racecourse because its normal Nakayama Racecourse venue was undergoing renovations at the time. After his previous performance, Shinzan was considered the number-one favorite. He dashed up towards the front at the start of the race, then fell back to the middle pack before surging on the final straight to win the race by 3/4 lengths, earning his first crown.

Before the Tōkyō Yūshun (Japanese Derby), he was entered into an open race, where he lost for the first time, coming in 2nd, seemingly due to being slightly heavier. He lost seven kilograms ahead of the Derby, which he entered as the number-one favorite with 2.1 odds. Out of the 27 horses in the field, Shinzan started in the fourth bracket, considered an extremely good starting point. Like before, he stayed in the midfield before accelerating on the third corner to pull into the lead. Umeno Chikara passed him on the inside, managing to pull a full length ahead. Shinzan sped up again, coming up alongside Umeno Chikara at around the 100-meter mark, then accelerated to win by 1 1/4 lengths. After the race, his jockey Kurita commented that "I ran him knowing it would be my responsibility if he lost. [But] It was easier than with Kodama [ja] (a double-crown winner from 1960)." Meanwhile, Takeo Ito, who jockeyed Umeno Chikara, admitted to his defeat, saying "The race went exactly the way we wanted and we still lost. Shinzan is strong. I have no regrets."

Having attained two of three crowns, Shinzan's team eschewed the normal practice of staying in Hokkaido for the summer, opting instead to continue training at the stable. However, it was reportedly hotter that summer than it had been in decades. Shinzan seemed to suffer because of the heat, and despite various attempts by Takeda and others, they weren't able to train the horse properly until after September as autumn arrived. He entered an open race on 10 October, where he lost a second time, taking second place to underdog Ichimikado. Then, at the Keisei Hai, he was defeated by Ballymoss Nisei. These results seemed to signal a poor performance at the Kikuka Sho, the final of the three Triple Crown races, but just before the race the horse made a rapid recovery.

Shinzan came into the Kikuka Sho on 15 November as the second favorite behind Umeno Chikara, who had swept the St Lite Kinen, a preliminary race. Umeno Chikara had 39.9% odds to win, while Shinzan had 31.6%, dominating the rest of the field. Takeda told Kurita not to press the attack even if it cost him the victory, believing that whoever pressed first would lose. However, as the race began, Kane Keyaki (two-crown winner of the fillies' Oka Sho and Yushun Himba) stole the lead and broke away from the field. She created a gap of over 20 lengths from Shinzan and Umeno Chikara, who were in the middle of the pack. However, Kane Keyaki slowed as she rounded the third corner on the second lap, allowing the trailing horses to catch up. Near the end of the race, Umeno Chikara—who had been right behind Shinzan for the entire race—pushed forward, aiming to pass Kanekeyaki. Kurita waited another moment before accelerating. Shinzan swung wide on the last turn and passed the rest of the pack, comfortably winning his third crown. The win made Shinzan the first horse to win the Triple Crown since St Lite in 1941.

Shinzan was then expected to contest the year-end Arima Kinen, but the horse's exhaustion after the Kikuka Sho lingered. Takeda decided not to enter the horse into it in consideration of the previous summer's heat and the horse's accomplishments and rest him instead.

=== 1965: four-year-old season ===
Shinzan was initially scheduled to enter the spring Tennō Shō, but Takeda canceled his participation because while the horse's fatigue had cleared, one of his hooves became inflamed; during this time, he couldn't be trained to Takeda's satisfaction, nor would he eat much fodder. Takeda decided to continue letting Shinzan rest until the Takarazuka Kinen on 29 May. (The Takarazuka Kinen was not counted as one of the eight most important races at the time, so this win was not considered to be another "crown" for Shinzan.)

Despite it having been about half a year since racing last, Shinzan won the race, then followed it up with an open race win on 13 June. This performance placed him at the top of the fan votes for the Takarazuka Kinen. The track was in poor condition, a first for Shinzan, but he swung wide on the final straight, surging up from fourth place to defeat Ballymoss Nisei by half a length.

Shinzan once again spent the summer in the stable, but the average heat that year combined with better preparations led Takeda to continue to train him normally through the season. However, after contracting horse flu at the beginning of autumn, Shinzan was barred from going to Tokyo. Instead, Takeda opted for the Meguro Kinen, a handicap race. He worried about the handicap--63 kilograms of weight--but Shinzan won by half a length over the competent Bull Takachiho.

Shinzan entered the autumn Tenno Sho with a 1.0x payout. His main rival in the race was Haku Zuiko, who had won 9 of his 10 races. The race began with Miharukasu running at the front, with Shinzan, Haku Zuiko, Bull Takachiho, and Umeno Chikara waiting until the final stretch to accelerate. There, Shinzan came from the outside and Haku Zuiko from the inside. Ultimately, Shinzan won by two lengths, earning a fourth crown.

The last of the big eight races that Shinzan was eligible for but hadn't won yet was now the Arima Kinen, which he entered and contested on 26 December. Nakayama Racecourse was still damp from rain, making for poor conditions on the track. As the race began, Miharukasu (3rd in the autumn Tenno Sho) ran at the front, while Shinzan maintained a third-place position. By the third corner, Miharukasu had pulled away by seven or eight lengths, but as he turned onto the final straight, he suddenly took a far-outside route to try to avoid the much rougher inside line. This was also an attempt by his jockey, Takemi Kaga, to force Shinzan onto the inside line and slow him down. However, Shinzan then swung even further outside than Miharukasu, almost right up against the outside fence, causing him to be out of view of the audience. The television cameras also lost sight of him for a moment, causing the commentator to cry "Shinzan disappeared!" Shinzan ultimately won the race, earning his fifth and final crown, becoming the first horse to do so. After the race, Yoshito Matsumoto--who had ridden Shinzan instead of Kurita--commented that "Shinzan told me to go outside." Shinzan was retired after this race.

== Stud records ==
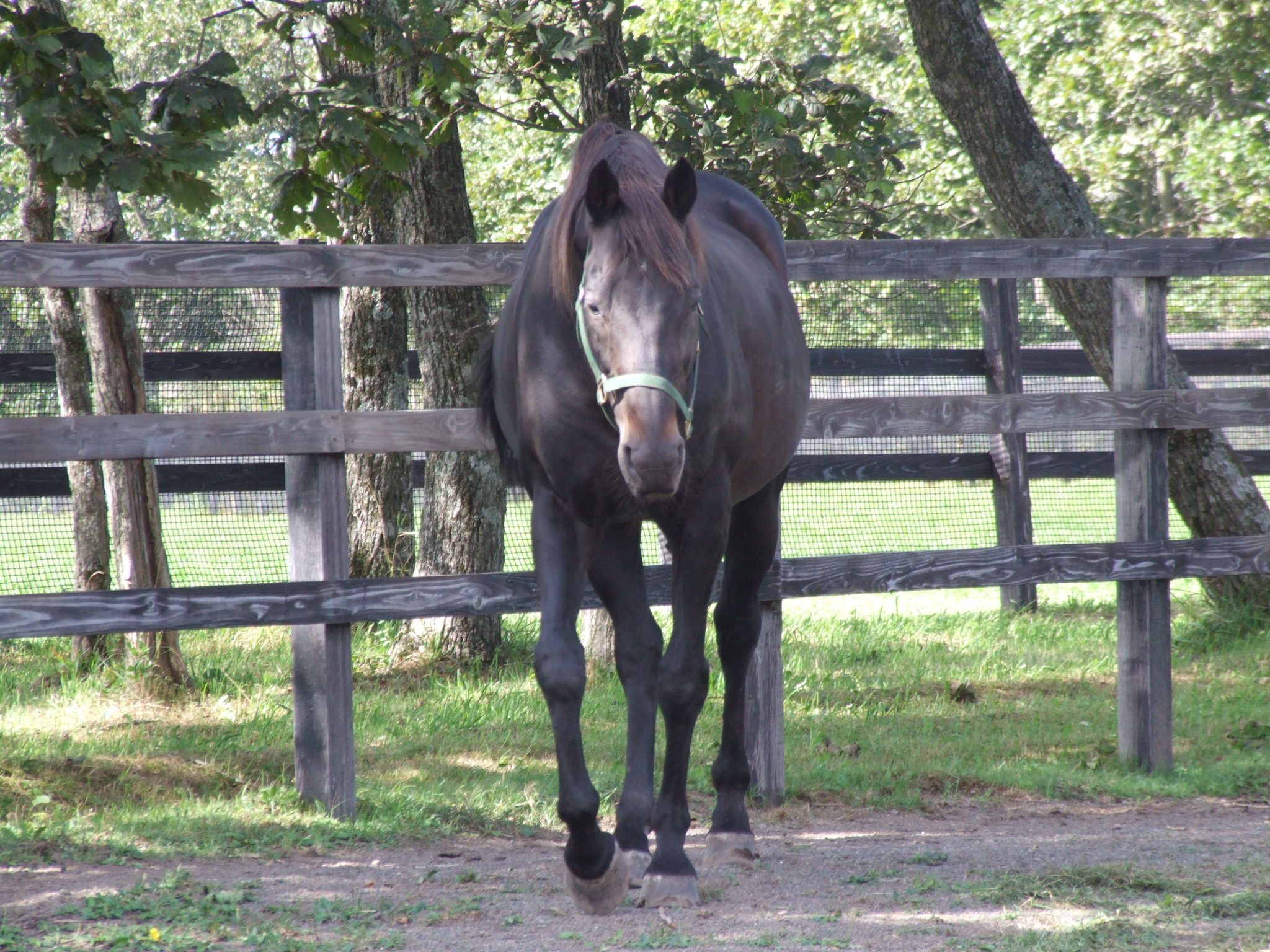
Miho Shinzan (Tanikawa Bokujō Kiyohata Jigyōsho, in Hidaka Town, Hokkaido)

Shinzan was a successful sire in Japan. His most successful offspring was Miho Shinzan, who won the Satsuki Sho (Japanese 2,000 Guineas), Kikuka Sho (Japanese St. Leger), and the Tenno Sho (Spring). He also foaled Minagawa Manna, another Kikuka Sho winner.

Pensioned from stud duties in 1987, Shinzan spent the rest of his life at Tanikawa Stud. He lost sight in his right eye in his later years and also lost all of his teeth. Eventually, he could not stand by himself at times, and his physical weakening became more prominent after February 1994. He died of old age at about 2:00 a.m. on 13 July 1996. He was 35 years, three months, and 11 days old. He is the longest-lived Thoroughbred horse ever recorded in Japan.

A funeral service was held posthumously. Shinzan's grave is located in the Tanikawa Stud of Urakawacho, Urakawa-gun, Hokkaido, and a bronze statue of Shinzan was built in this stud.

== Awards ==
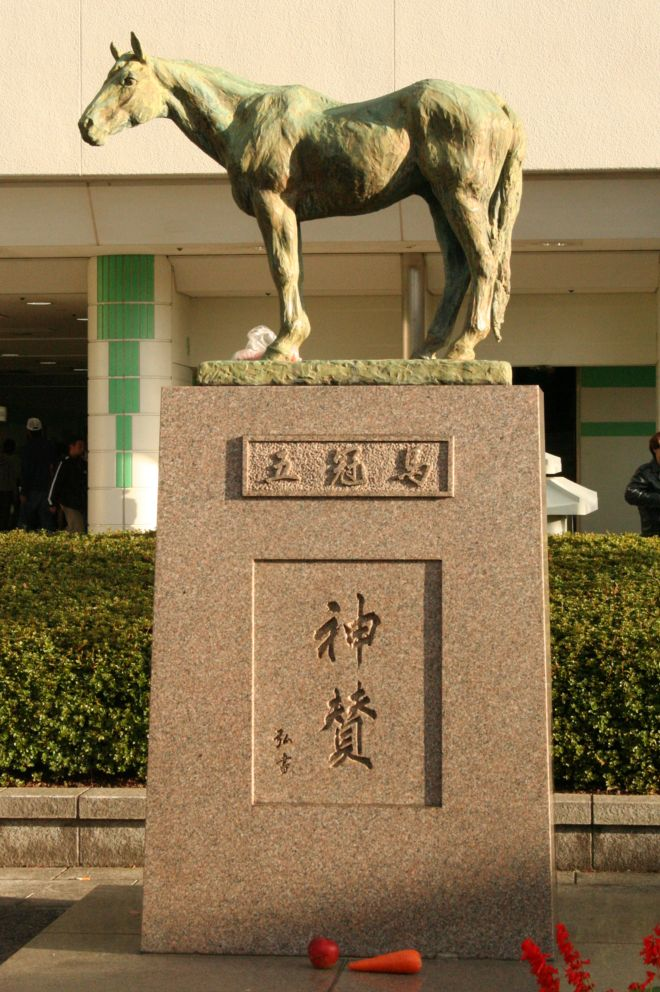
Shinzan statue at Kyoto Racecourse

- 1964 Horse of the Year and Best Three-year-old Colt (Keishu Award)
- 1965 Horse of the Year and Best Older Colt or Horse (Keishu Award)
- 1984 JRA Hall of Fame horse

(Keishu Award is current JRA Award.)

== Sire line tree ==
- Shinzan
  - Miho Shinzan
    - My Shinzan
      - Silk Selection
      - My Power
      - Mighty Shinzan

== Statistics ==
Statistics are based on information from netkeiba.com.

Date	Age	Course	Race	Distance (Condition)	Field	Bracket	Bib	Odds (Favorite)	Finish	Time	Distance (lengths)	Jockey	Weight (kg)	Winner (2nd Place)
November 10, 1963	2	Kyoto	3yo Newcomer	1200m (Firm)	14	3	3	1.9 (No. 1)	1st	1:13.9	4	Masaru Kurita	51	(Hoshitsuki)
November 30, 1963	2	Hanshin	Open	1400m (Good)	5	1	1	3.0 (No. 2)	1st	1:25.7	2 1/2	Masaru Kurita	51	(Ableman)
December 14, 1963	2	Hanshin	3yo Chukyori Tokubetsu	1600m (Good)	8	7	7	2.5 (No. 1)	1st	1:40.0	4	Masaru Kurita	55	(Okurayama)
January 4, 1964	3	Kyoto	Open	1600m (Firm)	5	5	5	1.3 (No. 1)	1st	1:42.3	2	Masaru Kurita	53	(Hanabishi)
March 29, 1964	3	Tokyo	Spring Stakes	1800m (Firm)	14	3	3	14.1 (No. 6)	1st	1:51.3	1/2	Masaru Kurita	55	(Yamanin Sweeper)
April 19, 1964	3	Tokyo	**Satsuki Shō**	2000m (Firm)	25	2	6	3.6 (No. 1)	1st	2:04.1	3/4	Masaru Kurita	57	(Asuka)
May 16, 1964	3	Tokyo	Open	1800m (Firm)	12	3	3	1.7 (No. 1)	2nd	1:50.8	0.1 s	Masaru Kurita	57	Yamanin Shiro
May 31, 1964	3	Tokyo	**Tōkyō Yūshun**	2400m (Firm)	27	4	10	2.7 (No. 1)	1st	2:28.8	1 1/4	Masaru Kurita	57	(Umeno Chikara)
October 10, 1964	3	Hanshin	Open	1800m (Firm)	12	6	8	1.5 (No. 1)	2nd	1:51.6	0.1 s	Masaru Kurita	60	Ichimikado
November 1, 1964	3	Kyoto	Keisei Hai	1800m (Firm)	6	3	3	2.3 (No. 1)	2nd	1:52.1	0.2 s	Masaru Kurita	60	Ballymoss Nisei
November 15, 1964	3	Kyoto	**Kikuka-shō**	3000m (Good)	12	2	2	3.2 (No. 2)	1st	3:13.8	2 1/2	Masaru Kurita	57	(Umeno Chikara)
May 29, 1965	4	Hanshin	Open	1600m (Good)	7	1	1	2.5 (No. 1)	1st	1:37.7	4	Hiroshi Takeda	59	(Yamahiro)
June 13, 1965	4	Hanshin	Open	1850m (Firm)	6	2	2	1.3 (No. 1)	1st	1:53.7	1 1/2	Hiroshi Takeda	59	(Yamahiro)
June 27, 1965	4	Hanshin	Takarazuka Kinen	2000m (Soft)	6	5	5	1.7 (No. 1)	1st	2:06.3	1/2	Masaru Kurita	59	(Ballymoss Nisei)
October 2, 1965	4	Hanshin	Open	1850m (Firm)	10	8	10	2.3 (No. 2)	1st	1:54.0	Head	Hiroshi Takeda	57	(Hikaru Pola)
November 3, 1965	4	Tokyo	Meguro Kinen (Autumn)	2500m (Good)	11	6	6	3.2 (No. 1)	1st	2:42.2	1/2	Masaru Kurita	63	(Bull Takachiho)
November 23, 1965	4	Tokyo	**Tennō Shō (Autumn)**	3200m (Firm)	12	7	9	1.3 (No. 1)	1st	3:22.7	2	Masaru Kurita	58	(Haku Zuiko)
December 18, 1965	4	Nakayama	Open	2000m (Firm)	5	3	3	1.5 (No. 1)	2nd	2:05.5	0.2 s	Hiroshi Takeda	60	Kuridei
December 26, 1965	4	Nakayama	**Arima Kinen**	2600m (Good)	8	4	4	1.4 (No. 1)	1st	2:47.2	1 3/4	Yoshito Matsumoto	56	(Miharukasu)

Race names in bold are part of the Eight Big Races (the eight races considered most important before the introduction of the grading system)

== Pedigree ==
Pedigree of Shinzan (JPN), bay stallion 1961
Sire Hindostan (GB)	Bois Roussel (FR)	Vatout	Prince Chimay
Sire Hindostan (GB)	Bois Roussel (FR)	Vatout	Vashti
Sire Hindostan (GB)	Bois Roussel (FR)	Plucky Liege	Spearmint
Sire Hindostan (GB)	Bois Roussel (FR)	Plucky Liege	Concertina
Sire Hindostan (GB)	Sonibai (GB)	Solario	Gainsborough*
Sire Hindostan (GB)	Sonibai (GB)	Solario	Sun Worship*
Sire Hindostan (GB)	Sonibai (GB)	Udaipur	Blandford
Sire Hindostan (GB)	Sonibai (GB)	Udaipur	Uganda
Dam Hayanobori (JPN)	Hayatake (JPN)	Theft	Tetratema
Dam Hayanobori (JPN)	Hayatake (JPN)	Theft	Voleuse*
Dam Hayanobori (JPN)	Hayatake (JPN)	Hiryū	Clackmannan
Dam Hayanobori (JPN)	Hayatake (JPN)	Hiryū	Yinkari
Dam Hayanobori (JPN)	Daigo Buchanum Beauty (JPN)	Tournesol	Gainsborough*
Dam Hayanobori (JPN)	Daigo Buchanum Beauty (JPN)	Tournesol	Soliste
Dam Hayanobori (JPN)	Daigo Buchanum Beauty (JPN)	Buchanum Beauty	Shian Mor
Dam Hayanobori (JPN)	Daigo Buchanum Beauty (JPN)	Buchanum Beauty	Daisan Beautiful Dreamer (Family 12)

* Shinzan is inbred 4S x 4D to the stallion Gainsborough, meaning that he appears fourth generation on the sire side of his pedigree and fourth generation on the dam side of his pedigree.

* Shinzan is inbred 4S x 5D to the mare Sun Worship, meaning that she appears fourth generation on the sire side of his pedigree and fifth generation (via Voleuse) on the dam side of his pedigree.

== See also ==
- List of racehorses
- St Lite (Japanese first Triple Crown in 1941)
- Mr. C.B. (Japanese Triple crown in 1983)
- Symboli Rudolf (Japanese first undefeated Triple crown in 1984)
- Narita Brian (Japanese Triple crown in 1994)
- Deep Impact (Japanese undefeated Triple crown in 2005)
- Orfevre (Japanese Triple crown in 2011)
- Contrail (Japanese undefeated Triple crown in 2020)
