= Mr. C. B. =

Japanese-bred Thoroughbred racehorse

Mr. C. B. ミスターシービー
- Mr. C. B. at the 1984 Japan Cup, ridden by Masato Yoshinaga.
- Breed: Thoroughbred
- Sire: Tosho Boy (JPN)
- Grandsire: Tesco Boy (GB)
- Dam: C.B. Queen (JPN)
- Damsire: Topyo (FR)
- Sex: Stallion
- Foaled: April 7, 1980
- Died: December 15, 2000 (aged 20)
- Country: Japan
- Colour: Dark Bay
- Breeder: Chigira Bokujo
- Owner: Marunuma Onsen Hotel Co., Ltd.
- Racing colors
- Trainer: Yasuhisa Matsuyama
- Jockey: Masato Yoshinaga
- Record: 15: 8-3-1
- Earnings: ¥409,598,100

Major wins
- Kyodo Tsushin Hai (1983); Yayoi Sho (1983); Tennō Shō (Autumn) (1984); Japanese Classic Race wins: Satsuki Sho (1983); Tokyo Yushun (1983); Kikuka Sho (1983)

Awards
- 3rd Japanese Triple Crown Champion (1983); Japanese Horse of the Year (1983)

Honours
- Japan Racing Association Hall of Fame (1986)

Mr. C. B. (Japanese: ミスターシービー, Hepburn: Misutā Shī Bī; 7 April 1980 – 15 December 2000) was a Japanese Thoroughbred racehorse and stud. In 1983, he won the Japanese Triple Crown, becoming the third horse to do so after St Lite and Shinzan. In recognition of this feat and his other strong showings, Mr. C. B. was named Japanese Horse of the Year for 1983 by the JRA, and would later be inducted into the Japan Racing Association Hall of Fame in 1986. He was also the first Triple Crown winner to be ridden by the same jockey, Masato Yoshinaga, from his debut until his retirement.

Mr. C. B. died of laminitis on 15 December 2000.

== Background ==
Mr. C. B. was a bay horse bred in Japan by Chigira Bokujo. He was sired by Tosho Boy, Satsuki Sho, Arima Kinen, Takarazuka Kinen and Takamatsunomiya Kinen winner. Tosho Boy was nicknamed "Pegasus" due to his racing performance. Tosho Boy is also an ancestor of Kikuka Sho winner Matikanefukukitaru and Singapore Airlines International Cup winner Cosmo Bulk. Mr C. B.'s mother, C. B. Queen, was also a successful racehorse who won races such as the Mainichi Okan and the Keio Hai Spring Cup. C. B. Queen and Tosho Boy both debuted in the same maiden race.

Mr C. B. was not given a unique name at birth and was known as "C. B. Queen 1" until a unique name was given. His initials "C. B." stand for Chigira Bokujō (lit. 'Chigira Farm'), his birthplace.Many of Tosho Boy's offspring had an unstable rear-oriented centre of gravity, however Mr C. B. had a solid waist and was known as "a horse that inherited only the good traits of Tosho Boy." He was the second "Mr. C. B." to be registered, the first being sired by Priory Park in 1934 at Chigira Bokujo. The first was unsuccessful in their bid to win the 1937 Japanese Derby, but saw moderate success in a later career in steeplechase.

After being weaned at Okamoto Farm, Mr C. B. was moved to Chigira Farm in Gunma Prefecture in March 1981. This farm was owned by C. B. Queen's owner and her breeder, and was where Mr. C. B. underwent training.

When he reached the age of 3, he was given the racing name "Mr. C. B.," and entered Matsuyama Yasuhisa's stable at the Miho Training Center in Ibaraki Prefecture. Initially, Mr C. B. was scheduled to be under the care of Matsuyama Yoshisaburo, who also looked after C. B. Queen, but it was changed to his son Yasuhisa.

== Racing career ==
=== 1982: two-year-old season ===
On 16 November 1982, Mr. C. B. made his debut in a maiden race at Tokyo Racecourse. Masato Yoshinaga, who had also been his dam’s regular jockey, was in the saddle, and Yoshinaga rode him consistently from then on until his retirement. In this debut race, he took the lead early and won convincingly by a margin of five lengths over the second-place finisher, securing his first victory. However, in his second race, the Kuromatsu Shō, he got off to a slow start and had to make up ground on the front-runners; he prevailed in a neck-and-neck battle with the frontrunners down the stretch to secure a narrow victory. Then, in the Hiiragi Shō, he ran at the end of the year, he thrashed violently inside the starting gate at the start and once again got off to a very slow start. Since he had expended a great deal of energy catching up to the front-runners in his previous race, Yoshinaga decided not to force the pace and instead adopted a strategy of biding his time from the rear. As a result, he fell a neck short of the front-runner, Umeno Shin O, and Mr. C.B. suffered his first defeat.

=== 1983: three-year-old season ===
Mr. C. B. started the season early, placing first in the Kyodo Tsushin Hai at Tokyo on the 13th of February, and then winning the Hochi Hai Yayoi Sho, now the Yayoi Sho, in March. He followed on this success to challenge the first leg of the Japanese Triple Crown for Colts, the Satsuki Sho at 2000m. Due to heavy rain before the race, the turf was graded "soft," the lowest rating used by the JRA. Despite the poor condition being considered a disadvantage to a closer such as Mr. C. B., he started the race as the favorite. He rallied after a late start to win by half a length, taking the lead at the final corner.

Although the favorite for the second leg of the Triple Crown, the Tokyo Yushun or Japanese Derby, doubts emerged among commentators. His sire, Tosho Boy, had lost the 1976 Derby to the largely overshadowed Climb Kaiser. His dam, C. B. Queen, had placed third in the Japanese Oaks, the filly equivalent to the Derby, run over the same course. Mr. C. B.'s and Matsuyama's adopted tactics of closing from the back markers was also considered a poor approach for the Derby, with the standing belief of the "Derby Position" suggesting that winning horses had to be in the top 10 by the first corner to win. Starting from the 12th gate on a field of 21, Mr. C. B. entered the first corner close to the back of the pack after another late start, but made a run at the third corner, and took the lead down the final stretch to win by a length and 3/4. While moving through the pack, Matsuyama was judged to have caused an incident, colliding at the fourth corner with another runner and veering towards the rail while crossing the finish line. His maneuver was criticized by the Fuji TV commentator, Takeshi Moriyama, but defended by jockey Eiji Shimizu who was aboard Mejiro Mont Cenis. Matsuyama received a 4 day riding suspension, but Mr. C. B.'s race result was allowed to stand.

Mr. C. B. contracted an illness and was forced to rest for the summer, drawing concerns that he would be in worse form than his peers for the final crown, the 3000m Kikuka Sho. He missed his intended prep race, the St. Lite Kinen, and placed 4th in the Kyoto Shimbun Hai on October 23, losing to second favorite Katsuragi Ace.

Despite his lackluster performance in the Shimbun Hai, he entered as favorite for the Kikuka Sho on 13 November. Sent off as the first favorite at 2.8 odds, Mr. C. B. made a clean start out of the gate, before falling through the midpack to the back markers. Defying conventional tactics, he surged early with nearly 1600m to go on the Yodo Slope, a sustained 4m slope ahead of the 3rd corner, ignoring Yoshinaga's attempts to restrain his charge. He broke through the pack early, coming to the front of the field while exiting the final corner, and holding his lead down the 400m stretch to claim victory in the Kikuka Sho. His 3 length victory over Bingo Kanta made Mr. C. B. only the third to take the Triple Crown in JRA history, 19 years after Shinzan had achieved the title.

== Stud record ==
=== Notable progeny ===
c = colt, f = filly, g = gelding

Foaled	Name	Sex	Major Wins
1987	Yamanin Global	c	Daily Hai Nisai Stakes, Meguro Kinen, Copa Republica Argentina
1987	Meisho Vitoria	g	Stayers Stakes
1987	Sweet Mithuna	f	Queen Cup

== In popular culture ==
An anthropomorphized version of Mr. C. B. appears as a character in the Japanese multimedia franchise Umamusume: Pretty Derby, voiced by Yurina Amami. She is a free-spirited, cheerful, and charismatic young woman who relishes in the freedom that comes with racing and utilizes unconventional tactics in harsh track conditions to her advantage. She was born to a trainer and trainee couple whose eloping resulted in a scandal, reflecting her real-world counterpart's foaling and controversy surrounding it. She is also a close friend and rival of Symboli Rudolf and Katsuragi Ace, and lives off-campus like Maruzensky. She makes an appearance as a supporting character in the spin-off series Umamusume: Cinderella Gray.

== Racing statistics ==
Mr. C. B. recorded a total of 8 wins for 15 starts, including one graded win, the G1 Autumn Tenno Sho. His Classic Triple Crown victories, achieved 19 years after the previous champion Shinzan, were part of the "eight major races", the classification for the most prestigious races in Japan before the introduction of the grading system in 1984. Retroactively applying the grades his races received in 1984, Mr. C. B. would hold the equivalent of 6 graded wins, including 4 Grade or Group 1 victories.

All information is publicly available on JBIS and Netkeiba.

Mr. C. B. race record
Date	Age	Track	Name	Grade	Distance	Finished	Time	Jockey	Winner (2nd Place)
6 Nov 1982	2	Tokyo	3 yo Debut (Note: Until 2001, Japanese horseracing used the kazoedoshi counting system where horses are considered one at birth and become one year older each New Year.)		1600m	1st	1:38.5	Masato Yoshinaga	(Hirataka Eiko)
4 Dec 1982	2	Nakayama	Kuromatsu Sho		1600m	1st	1:36.3	Masato Yoshinaga	(Yu Fubuki)
25 Dec 1982	2	Nakayama	Hiiragi Sho		1800m	2nd	1:50.4	Masato Yoshinaga	Umeno Shin O
13 Feb 1983	3	Tokyo	Kyodo Tsushin Hai		1800m	1st	1:49.5	Masato Yoshinaga	(Umeno Shin O)
6 Mar 1983	3	Nakayama	Hochi Hai Yayoi Sho		1800m	1st	1:50.2	Masato Yoshinaga	(Speed Tri)
17 Apr 1983	3	Nakayama	Satsuki Sho	八 (Note: Denotes a race belonging to the "Eight Great Races" (Hachidaikyousou), considered the most prestigious races in Japan, proceeding the introduction of the graded system in 1984.)	2000m	1st	2:08.3	Masato Yoshinaga	(Mejiro Mont Cenis)
29 May 1983	3	Tokyo	Tokyo Yushun (Japanese Derby)	八	2400m	1st	2:29.5	Masato Yoshinaga	(Mejiro Mont Cenis)
23 Oct 1983	3	Kyoto	Kyoto Shimbun Hai		2000m	4th	2:03.2	Masato Yoshinaga	Katsuragi Ace
13 Nov 1983	3	Kyoto	Kikuka Sho	八	3000m	1st	3:08.1	Masato Yoshinaga	(Bingo Kanta)
7 Oct 1984	4	Tokyo	Mainichi Okan	G2	1800m	2nd	1:47.5	Masato Yoshinaga	Katsuragi Ace
28 Oct 1984	4	Tokyo	Tenno Sho (Autumn)	G1	2000m	1st	1:59.3	Masato Yoshinaga	(Tudenham King)
25 Nov 1984	4	Tokyo	Japan Cup	G1	2400m	10th	2:28.2	Masato Yoshinaga	Katsuragi Ace
23 Dec 1984	4	Nakayama	Arima Kinen	G1	2500m	3rd	2:33.3	Masato Yoshinaga	Symboli Rudolf
31 Mar 1985	5	Hanshin	Sankei Osaka Hai	G2	2000m	2nd	2:01.4	Masato Yoshinaga	State Jaguar
29 Apr 1985	5	Kyoto	Tenno Sho (Spring)	G1	3200m	5th	3:22.3	Masato Yoshinaga	Symboli Rudolf

== Pedigree ==
Pedigree of Mr. C. B. (JPN), bay stallion 1980
Sire Tosho Boy	Tesco Boy	Princely Gift	Nasrullah
Sire Tosho Boy	Tesco Boy	Princely Gift	Blue Gem
Sire Tosho Boy	Tesco Boy	Suncourt	Hyperion
Sire Tosho Boy	Tesco Boy	Suncourt	Inquisition
Sire Tosho Boy	Social Butterfly	Your Host	Alibhai
Sire Tosho Boy	Social Butterfly	Your Host	Boudoir
Sire Tosho Boy	Social Butterfly	Wisteria	Easton
Sire Tosho Boy	Social Butterfly	Wisteria	Blue Cyprus
Dam C.B. Queen	Topyo	Fine Top	Fine Art
Dam C.B. Queen	Topyo	Fine Top	Toupie
Dam C.B. Queen	Topyo	Deliriosa	Delirium
Dam C.B. Queen	Topyo	Deliriosa	La Fougueuse
Dam C.B. Queen	Meido	Admiral Byrd	Nearco
Dam C.B. Queen	Meido	Admiral Byrd	Woodlark
Dam C.B. Queen	Meido	Meiwa	Gay Time
Dam C.B. Queen	Meido	Meiwa	Chill Wind
