= Kikuka-shō =

Horse race in Japan

Kikuka Shō Japanese St. Leger 菊花賞
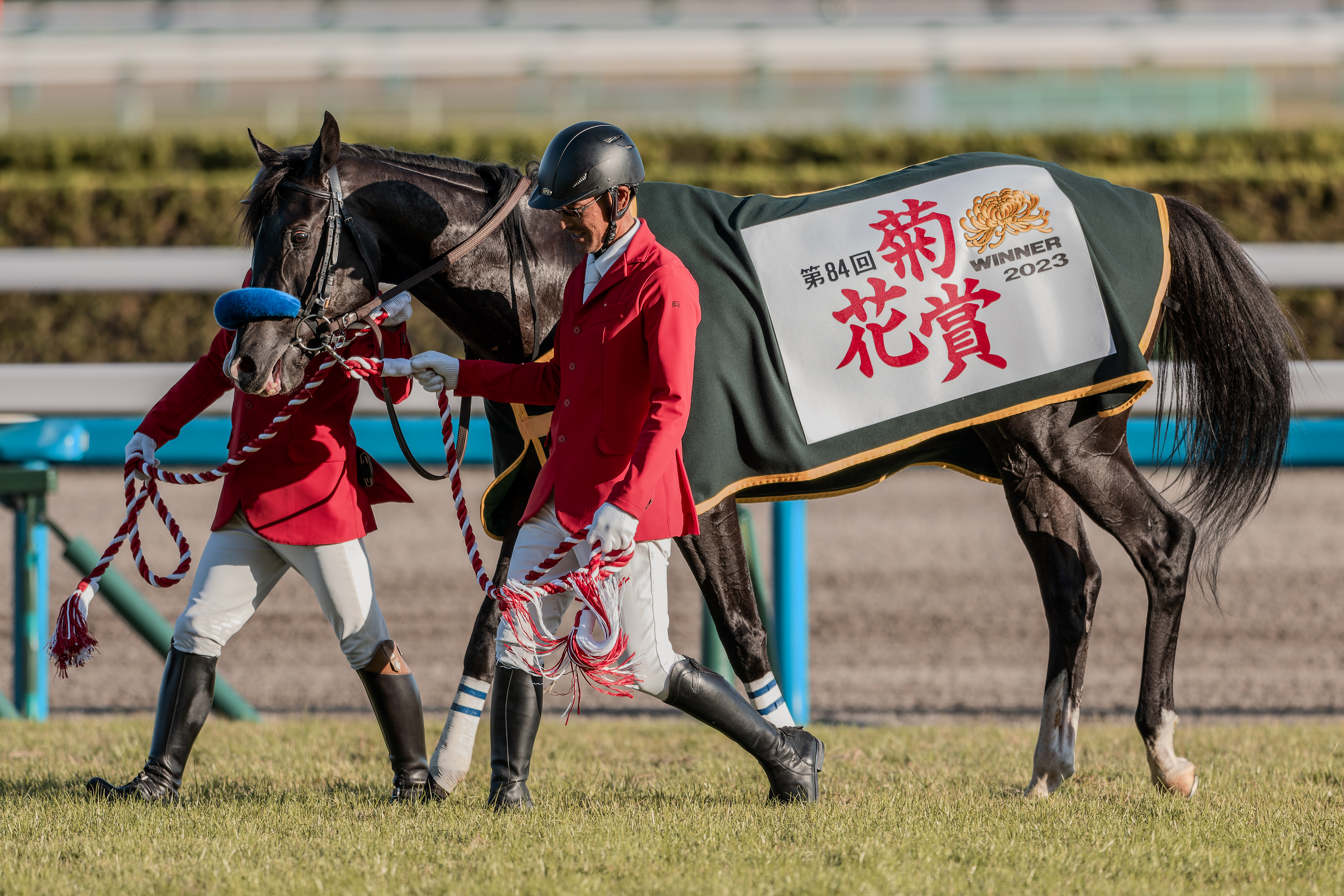
- 2023 Kikuka Shō winner, Durezza
- Class: Grade 1
- Location: Kyoto Racecourse; Fushimi, Kyoto
- Inaugurated: 11 December 1938 (87 years ago)
- Race type: Thoroughbred flat racing

Race information
- Distance: 3000 meters (About 15 furlongs or 1 7/8 miles)
- Record: 3:01.0 ; Toho Jackal (2014)
- Surface: Turf
- Track: Right-handed
- Qualification: Three-years-old Colts & Fillies
- Weight: 57 kg Allowances; 2 kg for fillies
- Purse: ¥ 432,000,000 (as of 2026): 1st: ¥ 200,000,000; 2nd: ¥ 80,000,000; 3rd: ¥ 50,000,000
- Bonuses: Classic Triple Crown; Winner of Satsuki Shō, Tōkyō Yūshun and Kikuka Shō ¥ 300,000,000

The Kikuka Shō (菊花賞; Kikka-Shō) is a Japanese Grade 1 flat race for three-year-old thoroughbred colts and fillies. It is run over a distance of 3,000 metres (approximately 1 mile 7 furlongs) at the Kyoto Racecourse, Fushimi, Kyoto, in late October.

== History ==
The Kikuka Shō was first contested in 1938 as Kyōto Nōrinshō Shōten Yonsai Yobiuma (京都農林省賞典四歳呼馬) over a distance of 3,000 metres at Kyoto Racecourse, and renamed to current name in 1948. It is the Japanese equivalent of the English St. Leger Stakes.

The race was run at Kyoto since 1938, except 1979, 2021 and 2022 at Hanshin Racecourse.

It is the final leg of the Japanese Triple Crown, preceded by the Satsuki Shō (the Japanese equivalent of the English 2,000 Guineas) in mid-to-late April and the Tōkyō Yūshun (the Japanese equivalent of the English Epsom Derby) in late May or early June.

== Trial races ==
Trial races provide automatic berths to the winning horses or placed horses as specified.

Race Name	Class	Racecourse	Distance	Condition
St. Lite Kinen	GII	(Japan) Nakayama	2,200 meters	Top 3 horses
Kobe Shimbun Hai	GII	(Japan) Hanshin	2,400 meters	Top 3 horses

There are only two trial races for the Kikuka Sho. The top three finishers in the St. Lite Kinen and the Kobe Shimbun Hai are guaranteed a priority to enter the race. the other Classic races are only provide priority-entry-rights to the winner. and the runner-ups from the Classics, as well as top two finishers from NHK Mile Cup, are also eligible to participate if they are registered with the National Association of Racing.

== Records ==
- Fastest winning time : 3:01.0 – Toho Jackal (2014)
- Slowest winning time : 3:26 4/5 – Azumarai (1946)

Leading jockey:

- 6 – Yutaka Take : Super Creek (1988), Dance in the Dark (1996), Air Shakur (2000), Deep Impact (2005), World Premiere (2019), Going to Sky (2026)

Leading trainer:

- 5 – Tokichi Ogata : Tetsumon (1938), Kurifuji (1943), Hakuryo (1953), Haku Kurama (1959), Great Yoruka (1963)

Leading owner:

- 3 – Shadai Race Horse : Dance in the Dark (1996), That's the Plenty (2003), Song of Wind (2006)
- 3 – Sunday Racing : Delta Blues (2004), Orfevre (2011), Fierement (2018)

== Winners since 1984 ==
Year	Winner	Jockey	Trainer	Owner	Time
1984	Symboli Rudolf	Yukio Okabe	Yuji Nohira	Symboli Bokujo	3:06.8
1985	Miho Shinzan	Masato Shibata	Tomojiro Tanaka	Kanji Tsutsumi	3:08.1
1986	Mejiro Durren	Yoshiyuki Muramoto	Yasuo Ikee	Mejiro Shoji Co., Ltd.	3:09.2
1987	Sakura Star O	Shinji Azuma	Yuji Hirai	Sakura Commerce Co., Ltd.	3:08.0
1988	Super Creek	Yutaka Take	Shuji Ito	Makoto Kikura	3:07.3
1989	Bamboo Begin	Katsumi Minai	Tadashi Fuse	Tatsuichi Takeda	3:07.7
1990	Mejiro McQueen	Koichi Uchida	Yasuo Ikee	Mejiro Shoji Co., Ltd.	3:06.2
1991	Leo Durban	Yukio Okabe	Shinji Okuhira	Ryuu Tanaka	3:09.5
1992	Rice Shower	Hitoshi Matoba	Yoshiji Iizuka	Hideo Kuribayashi	3:05.0
1993	Biwa Hayahide	Yukio Okabe	Mitsumasa Hamada	Biwa Co., Ltd.	3:04.7
1994	Narita Brian	Katsumi Minai	Masaaki Okubo	Hidenori Yamaji	3:04.6
1995	Mayano Top Gun	Seiki Tabara	Masahiro Sakaguchi	Yu Tadokoro	3:04.4
1996	Dance in the Dark	Yutaka Take	Kojiro Hashiguchi	Shadai Race Horse Co., Ltd.	3:05.1
1997	Matikanefukukitaru	Katsumi Minai	Hisao Nibun	Masuo Hosokawa	3:07.7
1998	Seiun Sky	Norihiro Yokoyama	Kazutaka Yasuda	Masayuki Nishiyama	3:03.2
1999	Narita Top Road	Kunihiko Watanabe	Yoshio Oki	Hidenori Yamaji	3:07.6
2000	Air Shakur	Yutaka Take	Hideyuki Mori	Lucky Field Co., Ltd.	3:04.7
2001	Manhattan Cafe	Masayoshi Ebina	Futoshi Kojima	Kiyoshi Nishikawa	3:07.2
2002	Hishi Miracle	Koichi Tsunoda	Masaru Sayama	Masaichiro Abe	3:05.9
2003	That's the Plenty	Katsumi Ando	Kojiro Hashiguchi	Shadai Race Horse Co., Ltd.	3:04.8
2004	Delta Blues	Yasunari Iwata	Katsuhiko Sumii	Sunday Racing	3:04.8
2005	Deep Impact	Yutaka Take	Yasuo Ikee	Kaneko Makoto Holdings	3:04.6
2006	Song of Wind	Koshiro Take	Hidekazu Asami	Shadai Race Horse Co., Ltd.	3:02.7
2007	Asakusa Kings	Hirofumi Shii	Ryuji Okubo	Keiko Tahara	3:05.1
2008	Oken Bruce Lee	Hiroyuki Uchida	Hidetaka Otonashi	Akira Fukui	3:05.7
2009	Three Rolls	Suguru Hamanaka	Kohei Take	Nagai Shoji Co., Ltd.	3:03.5
2010	Big Week	Yuga Kawada	Hiroyuki Nagahama	Yuzo Tanimizu	3:06.1
2011	Orfevre	Kenichi Ikezoe	Yasutoshi Ikee	Sunday Racing	3:02.8
2012	Gold Ship	Hiroyuki Uchida	Naosuke Sugai	Eiichi Kobayshi	3:02.9
2013	Epiphaneia	Yuichi Fukunaga	Katsuhiko Sumii	Carrot Farm Co., Ltd.	3:05.2
2014	Toho Jackal	Manabu Sakai	Kiyoshi Tani	Toho Bussan Co., Ltd.	3:01.0
2015	Kitasan Black	Hiroshi Kitamura	Hisashi Shimizu	Ono Shoji Co., Ltd.	3:03.9
2016	Satono Diamond	Christophe Lemaire	Yasutoshi Ikee	Hajime Satomi	3:03.3
2017	Kiseki	Mirco Demuro	Katsuhiko Sumii	Tatsue Ishikawa	3:18.9
2018	Fierement	Christophe Lemaire	Takahisa Tezuka	Sunday Racing	3:06.1
2019	World Premiere	Yutaka Take	Yasuo Tomomichi	Ryoichi Otsuka	3:06.0
2020	Contrail	Yuichi Fukunaga	Yoshito Yahagi	Shinji Maeda	3:05.5
2021	Titleholder ^{[a]}	Takeshi Yokoyama	Toru Kurita	Hiroshi Yamada	3:04.6
2022	Ask Victor More ^{[a]}	Hironobu Tanabe	Yasuhito Tamura	Hirosaki Toshihiro HD	3:02.4
2023	Durezza	Christophe Lemaire	Tomohito Ozeki	Carrot Farm Co., Ltd.	3:03.1
2024	Urban Chic	Christophe Lemaire	Ryo Takei	Silk Racing	3:04.1
2025	Energico	Christophe Lemaire	Mizuki Takayanagi	Silk Racing	3:04.0
2026	Going to Sky	Yutaka Take	Yuki Uehara	Field Racing	3:04.5

- ^{a} The 2021 and 2022 editions were contested at Hanshin Racecourse, due to renovations held at the Kyoto Racecourse.

== Earlier winners ==
- 1938 - Tetsumon
- 1939 - Marutake
- 1940 - Tetsuzakura
- 1941 - St Lite
- 1942 - Hayatake
- 1943 - Kurifuji
- 1944 - no race
- 1945 - no race
- 1946 - Azumarai
- 1947 - Browny
- 1948 - Newford
- 1949 - Tosa Midori
- 1950 - High Record
- 1951 - Track O
- 1952 - Saint O
- 1953 - Hakuryo
- 1954 - Dainana Hoshu
- 1955 - Meiji Hikari
- 1956 - Kitano O
- 1957 - Rhapsody
- 1958 - Koma Hikari
- 1959 - Hakukurama
- 1960 - Kitano Oza
- 1961 - Azuma Tenran
- 1962 - Hirokimi
- 1963 - Great Yoruka
- 1964 - Shinzan
- 1965 - Dai Koter
- 1966 - Nasuno Kotobuki
- 1967 - Knit Eight
- 1968 - Asaka O
- 1969 - Akane Tenryu
- 1970 - Date Tenryu
- 1971 - Nihon Pollow Moutiers
- 1972 - Ishino Hikaru
- 1973 - Take Hope
- 1974 - Kitano Kachidoki
- 1975 - Kokusai Prince
- 1976 - Green Grass
- 1977 - Press Toko
- 1978 - Inter Gushiken
- 1979 - Hashi Hermit
- 1980 - North Gust
- 1981 - Minagawa Manna
- 1982 - Horisky
- 1983 - Mr. C.B.

== See also ==
- Horse racing in Japan
- List of Japanese flat horse races
