= Symboli Rudolf =

Japanese-bred Thoroughbred racehorse

Symboli Rudolf シンボリルドルフ
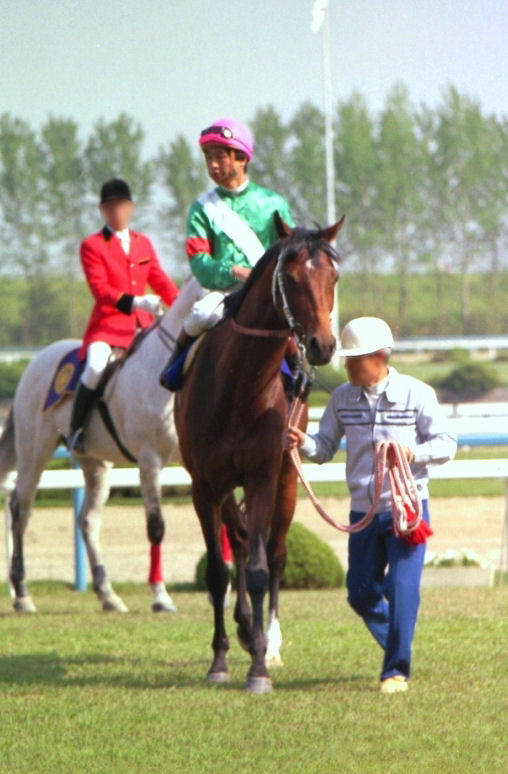
- Symboli Rudolf and Yukio Okabe at the Spring Tennō Shō in 1985.
- Breed: Thoroughbred
- Sire: Partholon (IRE)
- Grandsire: Milesian (IRE)
- Dam: Sweet Luna (JPN)
- Damsire: Speed Symboli (JPN)
- Sex: Stallion
- Foaled: March 13, 1981
- Died: October 4, 2011 (aged 30)
- Country: Japan
- Colour: Bay
- Breeder: Symboli Bokujo
- Owner: Symboli Bokujo
- Racing colours
- Trainer: Yuji Nohira
- Jockey: Yukio Okabe
- Record: 16: 13–1–1
- Earnings: ¥684,824,200

Major wins
- Yayoi Sho (1984); St Lite Kinen (1984); Arima Kinen (1984, 1985); Tennō Shō (Spring) (1985); Japan Cup (1985); Japanese Classic Race wins: Satsuki Shō (1984); Tōkyō Yūshun (1984); Kikuka Shō (1984)

Awards
- 4th Japanese Triple Crown Champion (1984); JRA Award for Best Three-Year-Old Colt (Note: Prior to Japan's revision of the way it counts horse ages to match the international standard in 2001, newborns used to be considered 1 year old, thus this award at the time was named "Best Three-Year-Old Colt.") (1984); Japanese Horse of the Year (1984, 1985); JRA Award for Best Older Male Horse (1985)

Honours
- Japan Racing Association Hall of Fame (1987)

Symboli Rudolf (Japanese: シンボリルドルフ, Hepburn: Shinbori Rudorufu; March 13, 1981 – October 4, 2011) was a champion Japanese Thoroughbred racehorse and sire. In 1984, he became the fourth colt to win the Japanese Triple Crown, and was inducted into the Japan Racing Association Hall of Fame in 1987. He would go on to win a total of seven Grade 1 races throughout his career, including the 1984 Arima Kinen, as well as the Japan Cup, Tennō Shō (Spring), and another win in the Arima Kinen in the following year. He was sired by Partholon, a son of Milesian, and out of Sweet Luna, a daughter of Speed Symboli. Due to his racing career and his namesake, Rudolf I of Germany, the horse was dubbed "Kōtei (皇帝)", or emperor.

== Background ==
Symboli Rudolf's father, Partholon, was a leading sire in Japan, while Rudolf's mother, Sweet Luna, was the offspring of Speed Symboli, a famous horse born at Symboli Bokujo. Sweet Luna's first foal with Partholon was Symboli Friend, who, despite his talent, had a poor temper; his best race result was winning the Keio Hai Spring Handicap. They had two more foals after that, but both had difficult temperaments and didn't see success. Nevertheless, Tomohiro Wada at Symboli Bokujo had the pair mate a fourth time, which resulted in Symboli Rudolf's birth in 1981. He had a crescent-moon-shaped mark on his forehead, and it was said that he only took twenty minutes to stand on his own after being born. While at the farm, he was called "Luna."

== Racing career ==
=== 1983: two-year-old season ===
Symboli Rudolf won his maiden race on July 23, 1983, at Niigata Racecourse. His jockey, Yukio Okabe, said afterwards that the horse had raced a 1600-meter race in 1000 meters.

After being trained at Symboli Bokujo after his debut, he returned to Miura Training Center in early October before winning the Icho Stakes on October 29. When his trainer Yuji Nohira saw Okabe's riding, he said he had run a 2400-meter race in 1600 meters.

For Symboli Rudolf's third race, his team eschewed the Asahi Hai Sansai Stakes, considered to be the junior championship race, instead opting for an open race on October 27, on the same day and at the same track as that year's Japan Cup. His trainer Nohira explained this choice as being rooted in a desire to show the rest of the world that Japan could produce incredible racehorses too.

=== 1984: three-year-old season ===
As the year began, Okabe was faced with a choice. He had also jockeyed Bizen Nishiki the year before, another strong horse who was on a four-race winning streak, but both he and Symboli Rudolf were slated to race against one another in the Yayoi Sho, the Satsuki Shō, and the Tōkyō Yūshun. There was a good deal of media attention given to this choice, and it was thought for a time that Okabe would choose Bizen Nishiki. However, he instead chose Symboli Rudolf, commenting that it wasn't even a choice at all.

Symboli Rudolf's first race in his 1984 three-year-old season was the G2 Yayoi Sho. Bizen Nishiki was the number-one favorite, but Symboli Rudolf defeated him by 1 1/4 lengths.

After recovering from a minor injury, the horse underwent harsher training to make up for it. He raced Bizen Nishiki again in the G1 Satsuki Shō, the first leg of the Japanese Triple Crown; the two were considered the two main racers, but Symboli Rudolf was the number-one favorite this time. After keeping a third-place position throughout the race, he moved into the lead on the fourth corner. The final stretch turned into a one-on-one between him and Bizen Nishiki on the outside, and the two horses knocked into each other at one point before Symboli Rudolf won by 1 1/4 lengths and setting a race record, earning his first crown. The oblique motion that led to the collision on the track saw Okabe prohibited from jockeying for the next two days. At the award ceremony, Okabe held one finger up in the air, anticipating two more crowns.

The 1984 Tōkyō Yūshun (Japanese Derby) was nicknamed the "SB Derby," indicating the fierce rivalry between Symboli Rudolf and Bizen Nishiki. Symboli Rudolf was overwhelmingly the favorite, however, with 1.3 odds. Several other racehorses pulled out of the race, leading to a field of 21 horses, which was the lowest it had ever been at the time. The track was in poor condition because of a late-spring cold wave and lingering snowfall, which had deposited dirt on the course, giving an edge to horses that had more power than speed. The race began with Suzu Mach, Fujino Fuun, and Suzu Parade, all strong horses, running in the lead. On the far straightaway, Symboli Rudolf didn't respond to Okabe's signal to spurt, leading to audible confusion in the crowd. But on the stretch, he grabbed his bit in his own teeth, overtaking the three in the lead to win his second crown. Bizen Nishiki ended the race far back in 14th, possibly due to his lightness and focus on speed. Okabe held two fingers up at the awards ceremony.

After the derby, Tomohiro Wada made plans for Rudolf to race overseas, which was reported in newspapers at the time. But after an injury to his left front leg and not meeting quarantine requirements, this plan was announced to be canceled in July.

Recovered from an injury to his right shoulder, Symboli Rudolf went into the autumn season fully refreshed, winning the St Lite Kinen with a record time. From there, he took on the Kikuka Shō, the last of the Triple Crown races. He kept to the middle pack, and while the racers slightly ahead of him formed a wall on the third corner, Rudolf broke out on the final stretch and passed Gold Way to win by 3/4 of a length. He became the first ever horse in JRA racing history to win the Classic Triple Crown while undefeated, as well as the first Classic Triple Crown winner after the introduction of the grading system. At the awards ceremony, Okabe held up three fingers. To date, four other horses have won the Triple Crown, but no others have come from the Kanto region.

After the 3000-meter Kikuka Shō, Symboli Rudolf advanced to the Japan Cup just a week later. The 4th Japan Cup was the first time two Triple Crown winners competed against each other, as Mr. C.B. had won the Triple Crown the year before. However, Symboli Rudolf was widely reported to be in bad shape, for example having diarrhea, and his younger age compared to the rest of the field as well as the 1-week gap from his previous race led to him being the number-four favorite, the lowest he would ever be in his career. The first favorite was Mr. C.B., who had just come off a record-breaking win at the Autumn Tenno Sho as an end closer. The second favorite was Bedtime, a British horse who was said to be G1-class despite never being able to run in a G1 race due to being a gelding; the third favorite was the American turf-racer Majesty's Prince, said to be the second coming of John Henry. However, Takarazuka Kinen winner Katsuragi Ace, who flew under the radar at number-ten favorite, went wire-to-wire to become the first Japanese horse to win the Japan Cup. Symboli Rudolf maintained a good position throughout the race, but came in 3rd place to Bedtime, bringing an end to his 8-win streak.

Coming off of his first loss, Symboli Rudolf next competed against Mr. C.B. and Katsuragi Ace in the Arima Kinen. While Rudolf was only second-place in the fan vote to Mr. C.B., he was the favorite to win, with 1.7 odds. Okabe devoted himself to learning more about Katsuragi Ace after the upset. Katsuragi Ace attempted to replicate his result in the Japan Cup, running far out in front; Rudolf maintained his position in 2nd place the entire time. On the final stretch, though, they traded places, Rudolf beating Katsuragi Ace by two lengths and achieving record time. Symboli Rudolf became the first JRA horse in history to earn four crowns in his three-year-old season. At the awards ceremony, Okabe held up four fingers. With a record that year of 6 wins and 1 third-place finish, Symboli Rudolf was chosen as the JRA's Horse of the Year.

=== 1985: four-year-old season ===
Symboli Rudolf's first race of 1985 was the Nikkei Sho, where he was favored to win with 1:1 odds. When no other horses took a position in front, Rudolf took the lead, winning by four lengths. Despite only being a G2 race, many saw this as the greatest display of Rudolf's strength. Okabe never took his hands off the reins once during the race.

His third race against fellow triple-crown winner Mr. C.B. came at the Spring Tenno Sho. Mr. C.B. surged early from the rear of the pack, just before the third corner. However, when Mr. C.B. slowed down going into the final stretch, Rudolf easily passed him, winning by 2 1/2 lengths over Sakura Gaisen, another foal of Partholon. At the awards ceremony, Okabe held up five fingers. Rudolf was the first horse to win five crowns since Shinzan.

From there, the team scheduled a race abroad—he, along with fellow Derby-winner Sirius Symboli, would compete in the King George VI and Queen Elizabeth Stakes. He was also voted into the 1985 Takarazuka Kinen, but on the Saturday before the race, the team pulled out of it because of a left shoulder limp sustained during his training because of a turf issue where the jockey was almost thrown off the horse. His owner Wada was furious, and the story was picked up by the news. The cancellation, however, was also due to Nohira sensing the horse was in poor condition; he didn't want Rudolf to run, which went counter to Symboli Bokujo's desire at the time, but Wada agreed to compromise. This injury cancelled Symboli Rudolf's plans to go abroad, with Sirius Symboli going alone. Wada also submitted his resignation at this time.

Meanwhile, the media reported on a comment of Wada's stating that Rudolf would retire. In a last-ditch effort, the team is said to have used acupuncture to heal Rudolf's condition; as the horse began to recover, Wada retracted his comment.

Symboli Rudolf's next race was the Autumn Tenno Sho, a 2000-meter course said to be unfavorable at the time; he was the number-one favorite despite starting far out in post 17. He was also still in the process of recovering from his injury. He had a late start as well, and the high pace of the race made it difficult for him to catch up. Still, on the opposite straight, he pulled into a better position, and coming into the final stretch he took the lead, causing a crazed uproar in the audience. But despite his astonishing strength at out-speeding horses like Windsor Knot, he ultimately lost just before the finish line by half a length to Gallop Dyna, the thirteenth-favorite. It was reported that after the race, Symboli Rudolf cried in frustration in his stable.

Despite the loss, trainer Nohira said, "They say there are no absolutes in horse racing, but Rudolf is an exception. He is an absolute."

Symboli Rudolf then returned to the Japan Cup after his loss there the year prior. This time, global media attention was on him, with many jockeys for other competing racehorses offering impressed comments on him. The Daily Racing Form placed him on the same level as John Henry and Sagace, winner of the previous Prix de l'Arc de Triomphe.

On the day of the race, weather was poor and the track's condition was heavy. Nevertheless, Symboli Rudolf won as the first favorite of the race, which had never happened before. Placing second was Rotsuki Tiger, a very strong racehorse on the local circuit, leading to the first-ever one-two finish for Japanese horses at the Japan Cup. At the awards ceremony, Okabe had to take his hands off the reins to indicate six crowns with his fingers.

Once again, the team scheduled the horse to go abroad, determining that the 1985 Arima Kinen would be his last run. Before the race, his trainer Nohira instructed Okabe to not just win, but overwhelm the others. He ultimately won by four lengths over Miho Shinzan, double-crown winner of that year's Satsuki Shō and Kikuka Shō. This was the first time a horse had won two Arima Kinen races in a row since Speed Symboli. Okabe didn't hold up seven fingers for this one.

With his 1985 record of four wins and one second-place finish, Symboli Rudolf was chosen as JRA's Horse of the Year a second time in a row. The selection committee's decision was unanimous for only the third time in history after Meiji Hikari in 1956 and Ten Point in 1977.

=== 1986: five-year-old season ===
In 1986, Symboli Rudolf went abroad, but Wada and Nohira had subtly different plans in mind. Wada wanted to go to the US first in the spring, then to Europe in the fall. Nohira's plan, however, was to let Rudolf rest in the spring before going to Europe in the fall. This created antagonism between the two, and while Wada's plan was adopted in the end, none of the stable team went with the horse, leaving him completely up to the staff on-site. Wada also wouldn't invite Nohira to foreign races, so Nohira had to travel there on his own dime to watch.

Wada's plan was to have Symboli Rudolf race first in the G1 San Luis Rey Handicap at Santa Anita Racecourse, then in the San Juan Capistrano Invitational Handicap. But during the first of those races, he lost to Dahar and came in 6th place. The reason for Rudolf's loss was given as desmitis in the horse's left front leg from having to cross the dirt course in the middle of the track—a famous characteristic of the track—and many Japanese news outlets reported on the same day that Rudolf had been injured and lost the race. Okabe had noticed the horse acting strangely during training before the race, and advised the team to pull out, but he wasn't listened to. Incidentally, each of Symboli Rudolf's losses were on left-handed courses.

After returning to Japan and a brief evaluation of returning overseas to race again, Symboli Rudolf was ultimately retired at a ceremony at Nakayama Racecourse on December 7. He wore a bib marked with the number 7 and a crown, representing his seven crowns. The horse reportedly jostled Yukio Okabe in the saddle, running left and right at will.

== Stud career ==
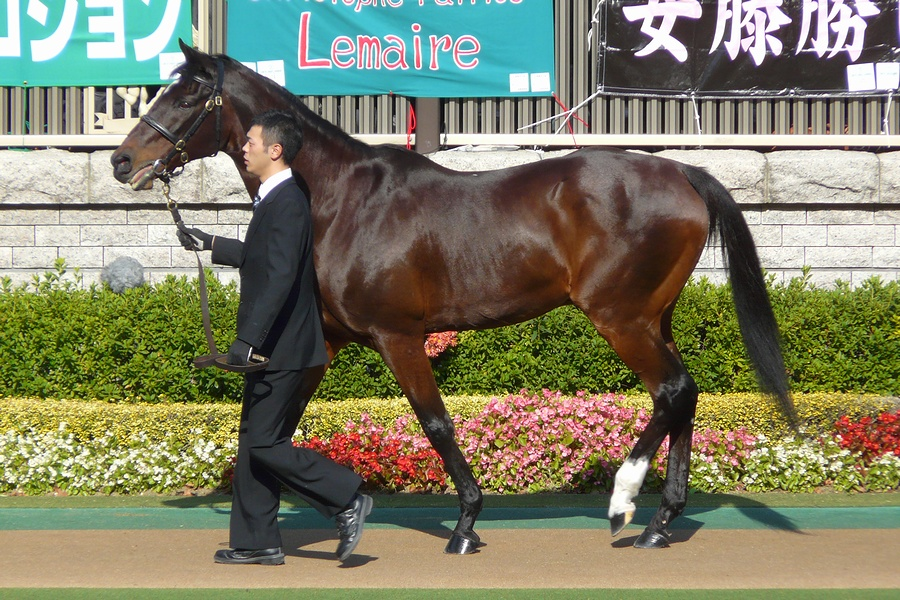
Symboli Rudolf in 2010 (Tokyo Racecourse)

As a stallion, Symboli Rudolf sired numerous grade winners. His most successful progeny was Tokai Teio, who won the Satsuki Shō and Tōkyō Yūshun in 1991, the Japan Cup in 1992, and the Arima Kinen in 1993.

Symboli Rudolf died on October 4, 2011, at Symboli Farm in Narita, Chiba.

=== Notable progeny ===
c = colt, f = filly
Bold = Grade 1 stakes

Foaled	Name	Sex	Major Wins
1988	Tokai Teio	c	**Satsuki Shō**, **Tōkyō Yūshun**, Sankei Ōsaka Hai, **Japan Cup**, **Arima Kinen**
1989	Ayrton Symboli	c	Stayers Stakes (twice)
1989	Kyowa Hoseki	f	Flora Stakes, Tokyo Shimbun Hai
1995	Tsurumaru Tsuyoshi	c	Asahi Challenge Cup, Kyōto Daishōten

== In popular culture ==
A sake brand, Nanakanba (七冠馬), is sold by Hikami Sake Brewery in honor of the horse. The Tamura family, who owns the brewery, is related to the Wada family, who owned the Symboli Ranch.

An anthropomorphized version of Symboli Rudolf appears as a character in the Japanese multimedia franchise Umamusume: Pretty Derby, voiced by Azusa Tadokoro. She is depicted as the student council president of Tracen Academy, celebrated by the training staff and students for her accomplishment of winning the Triple Crown. Rudolf tries to project herself as friendly and approachable despite her position and reputation by cracking puns and dad jokes in conversations, to the amusement of some listeners and the chagrin of others, including vice-president Air Groove.

== Racing form ==
The following form is based on information from JBIS-Search and netkeiba. (Note: Prior to Japan's revision of the way it counts horse ages to match the international standard in 2001, newborns used to be considered 1 year old, thus there is a one-year difference in the names of certain races.)

Date	Age	Race	Distance (Condition)	Class	Course	Field	HN	Finish	Time	Jockey	Winner (2nd Place)
Jul 23, 1983	2	Two Year Old Debut	1000 m (Heavy)		Niigata	10	6	1st	0:59.2	Yukio Okabe	(Broken Hill)
Oct 29, 1983	2	Ichō Tokubetsu	1600 m (Good)		Tokyo	17	4	1st	1:37.3	Yukio Okabe	(Ebisu George)
Nov 27, 1983	2	Three Year Old Open	1600 m (Firm)		Tokyo	5	1	1st	1:39.9	Yukio Okabe	(Haruda)
Mar 4, 1984	3	Yayoi Sho	2000 m (Firm)	GIII	Nakayama	14	12	1st	2:01.7	Yukio Okabe	(Bizen Nishiki)
Apr 15, 1984	3	Satsuki Shō	2000 m (Firm)	GI	Nakayama	18	10	1st	R2:01.1	Yukio Okabe	(Bizen Nishiki)
May 27, 1984	3	Tōkyō Yūshun	2400 m (Firm)	GI	Tokyo	21	10	1st	2:29.3	Yukio Okabe	(Suzu Mach)
Sep 30, 1984	3	St. Lite Kinen	2200 m (Firm)	GIII	Nakayama	10	5	1st	R2:13.4	Yukio Okabe	(Onward Cameroun)
Nov 11, 1984	3	Kikuka Shō	3000 m (Good)	GI	Kyoto	18	5	1st	3:06.8	Yukio Okabe	(Gold Way)
Nov 25, 1984	3	Japan Cup	2400 m (Firm)	GI	Tokyo	14	12	3rd	2:26.5	Yukio Okabe	Katsuragi Ace
Dec 23, 1984	3	Arima Kinen	2500 m (Firm)	GI	Nakayama	11	4	1st	R2:32.8	Yukio Okabe	(Katsuragi Ace)
Mar 31, 1985	4	Nikkei Sho	2500 m (Good)	GII	Nakayama	8	6	1st	2:36.2	Yukio Okabe	(Kane Kuroshio)
Apr 29, 1985	4	Tenno Sho (Spring)	3200 m (Firm)	GI	Kyoto	15	15	1st	3:20.4	Yukio Okabe	(Sakura Gaisen)
Jun 2, 1985	4	Takarazuka Kinen	2200 m (Firm)	GI	Hanshin	10	3	Scratched		Yukio Okabe	Suzuka Koban
Oct 27, 1985	4	Tenno Sho (Autumn)	2000 m (Firm)	GI	Tokyo	17	17	2nd	1:58.8	Yukio Okabe	Gallop Dyna
Nov 24, 1985	4	Japan Cup	2400 m (Soft)	GI	Tokyo	15	15	1st	2:28.8	Yukio Okabe	(Rocky Tiger)
Dec 22, 1985	4	Arima Kinen	2500 m (Firm)	GI	Nakayama	10	6	1st	2:33.1	Yukio Okabe	(Miho Shinzan)
Mar 9, 1986	5	San Luis Rey Handicap	1 1/2 miles (Firm)	GI	Santa Anita	7	5	6th	2:26.8	Yukio Okabe	Dahar

- R in the chart and the time written in red indicates the horse finished in record time.

== Pedigree ==
Pedigree of Symboli Rudolf
Sire Partholon	Milesian	My Babu	Djebel
Sire Partholon	Milesian	My Babu	Perfume
Sire Partholon	Milesian	Oatflake	Coup de Lyon
Sire Partholon	Milesian	Oatflake	Avena
Sire Partholon	Paleo	Pharis	Pharos
Sire Partholon	Paleo	Pharis	Carissima
Sire Partholon	Paleo	Calonice	Abjer
Sire Partholon	Paleo	Calonice	Coronis
Dam Sweet Luna	Speed Symboli	Royal Challenger	Royal Charger
Dam Sweet Luna	Speed Symboli	Royal Challenger	Skerweather
Dam Sweet Luna	Speed Symboli	Sweet Inn	Rising Light
Dam Sweet Luna	Speed Symboli	Sweet Inn	Feenagh
Dam Sweet Luna	Dance Time	Palestine	Fair Trial
Dam Sweet Luna	Dance Time	Palestine	Una
Dam Sweet Luna	Dance Time	Samaritaine	Maravedis
Dam Sweet Luna	Dance Time	Samaritaine	Sarita
