= Japanese Horse of the Year =

Japanese thoroughbred horse racing award

The Japanese Horse of the Year is the highest honor given to the most outstanding horse in Japanese thoroughbred horse racing. It is awarded annually by the Japan Racing Association (JRA). Since 1987 the honor has been part of the JRA Awards. This award originally started as part of the Keishū Sha Awards in 1954 and since 1972 part of the Yūshun Awards.

== Award recipients ==
Includes recipients of the award from 1954 to 1972, which was when the JRA Awards was called the Keishū Sha Awards. (Note: Sources for 1954, 1955,, 1956-1985, 1986, 1987 onwards)

Year	Horse	Trainer	Owner	Sex	Age
1954	Hakuryo	Tokichi Ogata	Hiroshi Nishi	c	4
1955	Otokitsu	Fusamatsu Okubo	Washitaro Kawaguchi	c	3
1956	Meiji Hikari	Tomiyoshi Fujimoto	Shinsaku Nitta	c	4
1957	Hakuchikara	Tokichi Ogata	Hiroshi Nishi	c	4
1958	Onward There	Toshio Nihonyanagi	Junzo Kashiyama	c	4
1959	Will deal	Senshi Hoshikawa	Kunijiro Asano	c	3
1960	Kodama	Yoshigoro Ito	Bungo Takeda	c	3
1961	Homareboshi	Toshio Hieda	Fumiko Kawaguchi	c	4
1962	Onslaught	Hiroshi Nakamura	Kishi Tamura	c	5
1963	Ryu Forel	Masaharu Hashimoto	Emiko Miyoshi	c	4
1963	Meizui	Tokichi Ogata	Yasushi Chigira	c	3
1964	Shinzan	Bungo Takeda	Kokichi Hashimoto	c	3
1965	Shinzan	Bungo Takeda	Kokichi Hashimoto	c	4
1966	Korehide	Tokichi Ogata	Yasushi Chigira	c	4
1967	Speed Symboli	Shozo Nohira	Tomohiro Wada	c	4
1968	Asaka O	Hiroshi Nakamura	Genji Asaka	c	3
1969	Takeshiba O	Suetaro Mitsui	Masao Obata	c	4
1970	Speed Symboli	Shozo Nohira	Tomohiro Wada	c	7
1971	Tomei	Masayuki Sakata	Katsuo Kondo	f	5
1972	Ishino Hikaru	Takeshi Asano	Kiyohito Ishijima	c	3
1973	Take Hope	Yukio Inaba	Take Kondo	c	3
1974	Kitano Kachidoki	Masatoshi Hattori	Yutaka Hatsuda	c	3
1975	Kaburaya O	Tamejiro Mogi	Yoshiko Kato	c	3
1976	Tosho Boy	Takayoshi Yasuda	Tosho Sangyo	c	3
1977	Ten Point	Sasuke Ogawa	Hisanari Takada	c	4
1978	Kane Minobu	Shotaro Abe	Ikuko Hatakeyama	c	4
1979	Green Grass	Takao Nakano	Kichishiro Hanzawa	c	6
1980	Hoyo Boy	Toshio Nihonyanagi	Yoshiharu Furukawa	c	5
1981	Hoyo Boy	Toshio Nihonyanagi	Yoshiharu Furukawa	c	6
1982	Hikari Duel	Hikozo Sugai	Zenkichi Hashimoto	c	5
1983	Mr. C. B.	Yasuhisa Matsuyama	Marunuma Onsen Hotel Co., Ltd.	c	3
1984	Symboli Rudolf	Yuji Nohira	Symboli Bokujo	c	3
1985	Symboli Rudolf	Yuji Nohira	Symboli Bokujo	c	4
1986	Dyna Gulliver	Kichizaburo Matsuyama	Shadai Race Horse	c	3
1987	Sakura Star O	Yuji Hirai	Sakura Commerce	c	3
1988	Tamamo Cross	Isami Obara	Tamamo Inc.	c	4
1989	Inari One	Kiyoshi Suzuki	Hiroki Hotehama	c	5
1990	Oguri Cap	Tsutomu Setoguchi	Shunsuke Kondo	c	5
1991	Tokai Teio	Shouichi Matsumoto	Masanori Uchimura	c	3
1992	Mihono Bourbon	Tameo Toyama	Mihono International	c	3
1993	Biwa Hayahide	Mitsumasa Hamada	Biwa Co., Ltd.	c	3
1994	Narita Brian	Masaaki Ookubo	Hidenori Yamaji	c	3
1995	Mayano Top Gun	Masahiro Sakaguchi	Yu Tadokoro	c	3
1996	Sakura Laurel	Katsutaro Sakai	Sakura Commerce	c	5
1997	Air Groove	Yuji Ito	Lucky Field Co., Ltd.	f	4
1998	Taiki Shuttle	Kazuo Fujisawa	Taiki Farm	c	4
1999	El Condor Pasa	Yoshitaka Ninomiya	Takashi Watanabe	c	4
2000	T. M. Opera O	Ichizo Iwamoto	Masatsugu Takezono	c	4
2001	Jungle Pocket	Sakae Watanabe	Yomoji Saito	c	3
2002	Symboli Kris S	Kazuo Fujisawa	Symboli Stud	c	3
2003	Symboli Kris S	Kazuo Fujisawa	Symboli Stud	c	4
2004	Zenno Rob Roy	Kazuo Fujisawa	Shinobu Osako	c	4
2005	Deep Impact	Yasuo Ikee	Kaneko Makoto Holdings Co., Ltd.	c	3
2006	Deep Impact	Yasuo Ikee	Kaneko Makoto Holdings Co., Ltd.	c	4
2007	Admire Moon	Hiroyoshi Matsuda	Darley Japan Farm Co., Ltd.	c	4
2008	Vodka	Katsuhiko Sumii	Yuzo Tanimizu	f	4
2009	Vodka	Katsuhiko Sumii	Yuzo Tanimizu	f	5
2010	Buena Vista	Hiroyoshi Matsuda	Sunday Racing Co.	f	4
2011	Orfevre	Yasutoshi Ikee	Sunday Racing Co.	c	3
2012	Gentildonna	Sei Ishizaka	Sunday Racing Co.	f	3
2013	Lord Kanaloa	Takayuki Yasuda	Lord Horse Club	c	5
2014	Gentildonna	Sei Ishizaka	Sunday Racing Co.	f	5
2015	Maurice	Noriyuki Hori	Kazumi Yoshida	c	4
2016	Kitasan Black	Hisashi Shimizu	Ono Shoji	c	4
2017	Kitasan Black	Hisashi Shimizu	Ono Shoji	c	5
2018	Almond Eye	Sakae Kunieda	Silk Racing Co	f	3
2019	Lys Gracieux	Yoshito Yahagi	U Carrot Farm	f	5
2020	Almond Eye	Sakae Kunieda	Silk Racing Co	f	5
2021	Efforia	Yuichi Shikato	Carrot Farm Co. Ltd.	c	3
2022	Equinox	Tetsuya Kimura	Silk Racing Co	c	3
2023	Equinox	Tetsuya Kimura	Silk Racing Co	c	4
2024	Do Deuce	Yasuo Tomomichi	Kieffers Co. Ltd.	c	5
2025	Forever Young	Yoshito Yahagi	Susumu Fujita	c	4

== Multiple Year Horses ==
The following horses were awarded more than once.

- Shinzan – 1964, 1965
- Speed Symboli – 1967, 1970
- Hoyo Boy – 1980, 1981
- Symboli Rudolf – 1984, 1985
- Symboli Kris S – 2002, 2003
- Deep Impact - 2005, 2006
- Vodka – 2008, 2009
- Gentildonna – 2012, 2014
- Kitasan Black – 2016, 2017
- Almond Eye – 2018, 2020
- Equinox - 2022, 2023
