= Narita Brian =

Japanese-bred Thoroughbred racehorse

Narita Brian ナリタブライアン
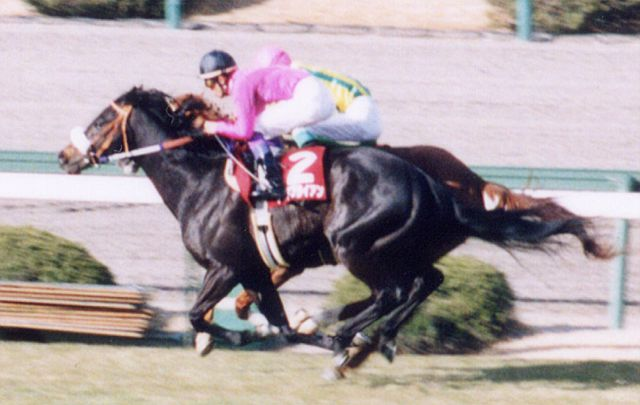
- Hanshin Daishōten (March 9, 1996)
- Breed: Thoroughbred
- Sire: Brian's Time
- Grandsire: Roberto
- Dam: Pacificus
- Damsire: Northern Dancer
- Sex: Stallion
- Foaled: May 3, 1991
- Died: September 27, 1998 (aged 7)
- Country: Japan
- Colour: Dark Bay
- Breeder: Hayata Farm
- Owner: Hidenori Yamaji
- Racing colors
- Trainer: Masaaki Ookubo
- Jockey: Katsumi Minai
- Record: 21: 12-3-1
- Earnings: ¥1,026,916,000

Major wins
- Asahi Hai Sansai Stakes (1993); Kyodo Tsushin Hai (1994); Spring Stakes (1994); Arima Kinen (1994); Hanshin Daishōten (1995, 1996); Japanese Classic Race wins: Satsuki Sho (1994); Tokyo Yushun (1994); Kikuka Sho (1994)

Awards
- 5th Japanese Triple Crown Champion (1994); Japanese Champion 2-Year-Old Colt (1993); Japanese Horse of the Year (1994); JRA Award for Best Three-Year-Old Colt (1994)

Honours
- Japan Racing Association Hall of Fame (1998)

Narita Brian (Japanese: ナリタブライアン, Hepburn: Narita Buraian; May 3, 1991 – September 27, 1998) was a Japanese Thoroughbred racehorse and sire. Until Special Week surpassed him in 1999, Narita Brian was Japan's top money earner. He was the fifth colt to win the Japanese Triple Crown in 1994, and also won the Arima Kinen in the same year. Narita Brian was nicknamed the "shadow roll monster" because he wore a shadow roll while racing.

He debuted in August 1993 and, from November of that year until March 1995, achieved five consecutive GI wins, including the Classic Triple Crown, and placed in the top two in 10 consecutive races. He was awarded the 1993 JRA Award for Best Three-Year-Old Colt and was chosen as the 1994 JRA Horse of the Year as well as Best Four-Year-Old Colt. (Note: Until 2000, Japanese racehorses were one year old at the time at the time of birth. The old name is used for each award.)

After developing a hip joint disease in the spring of 1995, his performance declined, winning only one graded race in six starts (with no GI victories in five starts). However, he drew fan attention with the match race against Mayano Top Gun at the 44th Hanshin Daishoten and by running in short-distance races such as the 26th Takamatsunomiya Kinen. Following tendonitis that developed after running in the Takamatsunomiya Kinen, he was retired from racing in October 1996. He became a sire after retirement, but in September 1998, he suffered a stomach rupture and was euthanized.

== Background ==
Narita Brian was born on May 3, 1991, at Hayata Ranch in Niikappu Town, Hokkaido. His father, Brian's Time, was a stallion imported from the United States and centred on Hayata Ranch. He was the fifth foal from Pacificus, a daughter of Kentucky Derby winner Northern Dancer. A year before his birth, Pacificus had foaled Narita Brian's half-brother Biwa Hayahide.

According to Hayata Ranch manager Ota Mie, Narita Brian did not stand out at first as a foal. However, his physical abilities were gradually appreciated by the staff who trained him. The staff member in charge of training at Hayata Ranch, Miyoshi Kiura, said he believed Narita Brian had a quality that surpassed his half-brother Biwa Hayahide in terms of suppleness and agility. Despite his potential, it was shown that he had a timid temperament. For example, during a training session, he was startled by a puddle and threw his rider off of his back.

Narita Brian was purchased by Yamaji Hidenori through a "yard deal" (the process of purchasing a horse without going through the auction process). After the horse was purchased, it was decided by Hidenori that Narita Brian would be trained by Masahiro Okubo of Central Horse Racing. The merchant of the horse was introduced to Okubo through livestock trader Kiyomasa Kudo, and Okudo approached Yamaji and expressed an interest in the horse. Okubo later recalled, "If Biwa Hayahide had succeeded earlier, Narita Brian would not have come to me."

== Racing career ==
=== 1993: two-year-old season ===
Narita Brian debuted in August 15, 1993 on a 1,200-meter newcomer race at Hakodate Racecourse. Having already attracted attention as the younger sibling of Biwa Hayahide, he was the second favorite but finished 2nd behind Long Unicorn. He then won his second start 2 weeks later at the same distance and racecourse. He then entered the Hakodate Sansai Stakes where he finished 6th, followed by a win in the 1,700-meter Kinmokusei Tokubetsu at Fukushima Racecourse.

He entered the Daily Hai Sansai Stakes where he finished 3rd. In his next start, he started wearing a shadow roll which greatly improved his concentration, winning the Kyoto Sansai Stakes by three lengths.

He then entered the Asahi Hai Sansai Stakes which he won by three and a half lengths, earning his first grade 1 victory.

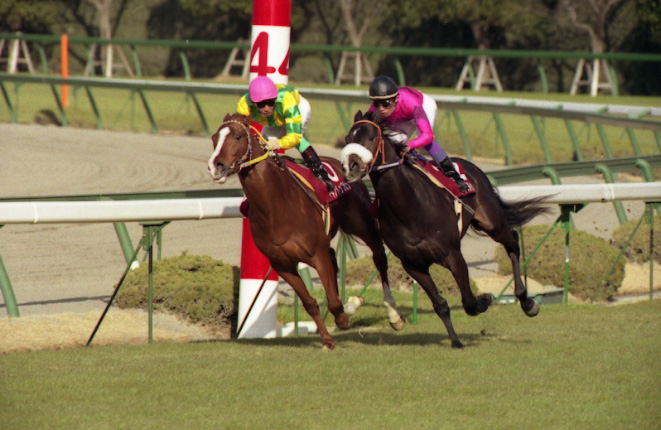
Mayano Top Gun and Narita Brian at the 1996 Hanshin Daishōten.

=== 1994: three-year-old season ===
He completed the Japanese Triple Crown of Thoroughbred Racing by winning the Satsuki Shō, Tokyo Yūshun and Kikuka Shō before defeating older horses at the Arima Kinen.

=== 1995 and 1996: four and five-year-old seasons ===
He stayed in training for a further two years, winning the Hanshin Daishōten in 1995 and 1996. In the latter year, he defeated the 1995 Japanese Horse of the Year Mayano Top Gun.

== Awards and honours ==
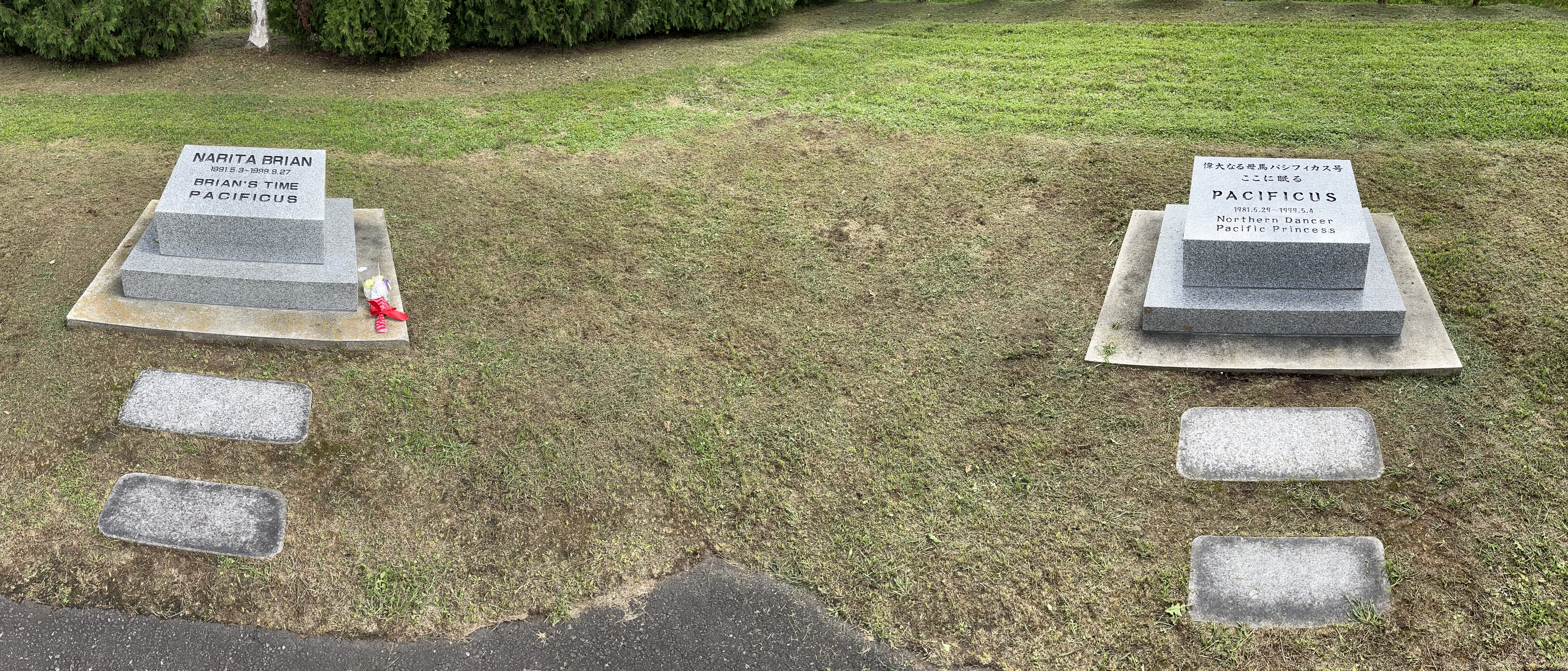
Narita Brian and Pacificus buried next to each other at the Yushun Memorial Hall

Narita Brian received the JRA Award for Best Two-Year-Old Colt in 1993. In 1994 he was voted the Best Three-year-old Colt and Japanese Horse of the Year in 1994. He was declared "Horse of the 20th century" in Japan. In 1998 he was elected to the JRA Hall of Fame.

A museum dedicated to Narita Brian named the Narita Brian Memorial Hall was opened on his death anniversary in 2000, but was closed in 2008. The structure is now the Yushun Memorial Hall, with the exhibits' focus being more oriented around those of Oguri Cap.

== Stud career ==
Narita Brian's most successful offspring was Daitaku Flag who was second in the Mainichi Hai and fourth in the Satsuki Sho; and Meine Vita who placed second in both Flower Cup and Sapporo Nisai Stakes. He never sired a graded race winner. In his short career as a stud, he bred with 187 mares, produced 151 foals, registered 147 of them, with earnings of ¥1,306,533,000 and AEI of 0.85.

== Death and memorials ==
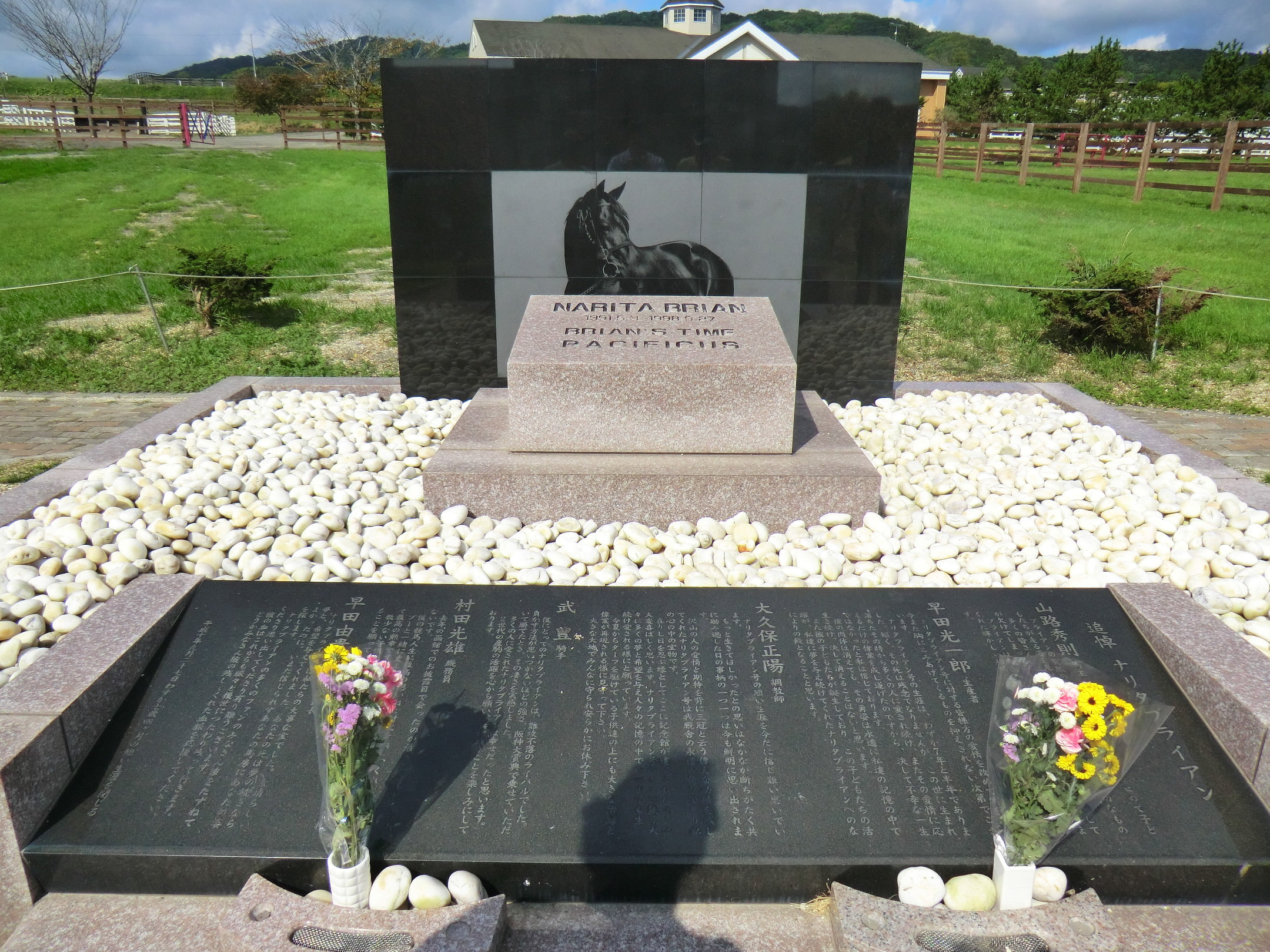
Narita Brian's tomb in Niikappu, Hokkaido

On 17 June 1998, it was discovered that Narita Brian had developed colic, and as a result of a medical examination at the Miishi Livestock Medical Center, it was revealed that he had developed a bowel obstruction. Emergency open surgery was performed, and Narita Brian had almost recovered only to develop colic again. The area where he was being kept at CB Stud was around 50 minutes away from the medical center and he had already developed a gastric rupture. Open surgery was again performed; however, it was too late. Narita Brian was euthanised on September 27, 1998. He was buried on the grounds of CB Stud.

In September 1999, a horse statue was erected in Ritto Training Center in Narita Brian's honour. It was also revealed by CB Stud manager Isao Sasaki that the stable used by Narita Brian would be "permanently retired". In October 2004, 10 years after Narita Brian had achieved the Classic Triple Crown, as part of the JRA Golden Jubilee Campaign's "Famous Horse Memorial Race", the "Narita Brian Memorial" was implemented at Kyoto Racecourse.

== In popular culture ==
An anthropomorphized version of Narita Brian appears as a character in the Japanese multimedia franchise Umamusume: Pretty Derby, voiced by Rika Kinugawa, taking over for Yūka Aisaka. She is characterized by her reliance on physical strength when running on the track, in contrast to her in-universe sister Biwa Hayahide's logical approach. While she is the second vice president of Tracen Academy's student council, she rarely engages in council activities or exercise her authority over troublemaking students, to the consternation of her fellow vice president Air Groove. Brian also retains her horse counterpart's nickname of "shadow roll monster", evoked by the medical plaster she wears on the bridge of her nose.

Narita Brian has been cited as the inspiration for the legacy system in the role-playing game series Fire Emblem, where in some of the series' entries characters can pass down traits and stats to younger generations. When developing Genealogy of the Holy War in 1994, the developers, who were fans of horse racing, were inspired by Narita Brian's Triple Crown victory, and decided to adapt the concept of horse bloodlines into their game, which acted as the basis for the game's setting spanning over several generations.

== Racing form ==
Narita Brian ran in 21 races in which he won 12 races (including 5 Group 1 wins), finished runner-up in three races, and a single third place. This data available is based on JBIS search, and netkeiba.com.

Date	Age	Racecourse	Race	Grade	Distance (condition)	Entry	HN	Odds (Favored)	Finish	Time	Margins	Jockey	Winner (Runner-up)
Aug 15, 1993	2	Hakodate	2YO Debut		1,200 m (Soft)	8	8	2.9 (2)	2nd	1:13.7	0.2	Katsumi Minai	Long Unicorn
Aug 29, 1993	2	Hakodate	2YO Debut		1,200 m (Soft)	9	6	2.0 (1)	1st	1:12.8	–1.4	Katsumi Minai	(Jinrai)
Sep 26, 1993	2	Hakodate	Hakodate Nisai Stakes	3	1,200 m (Soft)	9	5	3.8 (2)	6th	1:14.9	0.8	Katsumi Minai	Marry God
Oct 24, 1993	2	Fukushima	Kimmokusei Tokubetsu	ALW (1W)	1,700 m (Firm)	8	3	1.7 (1)	1st	1:43.1	–0.5	Eiji Shimizu	(Lancet)
Nov 6, 1993	2	Kyoto	Daily Hai Nisai Stakes	2	1,400 m (Firm)	15	6	4.2 (2)	3rd	1:22.7	0.7	Katsumi Minai	Bodyguard
Nov 21, 1993	2	Kyoto	Kyoto Nisai Stakes	OP	1,800 m (Firm)	8	6	2.0 (1)	1st	R1:47.8	–0.5	Katsumi Minai	(T M Inazuma)
Dec 12, 1993	2	Nakayama	Asahi Hai Futurity Stakes	1	1,600 m (Firm)	14	8	3.9 (1)	1st	1:34.4	–0.6	Katsumi Minai	(Field Bomber)
Feb 14, 1994	3	Tokyo	Kyodo Tsushin Hai	3	1,800 m (Firm)	10	2	1.2 (1)	1st	1:47.5	–0.7	Katsumi Minai	(Ines Souther)
Mar 27, 1994	3	Nakayama	Spring Stakes	2	1,800 m (Firm)	10	2	1.2 (1)	1st	1:49.1	–0.6	Katsumi Minai	(Fujino Makken O)
Apr 17, 1994	3	Nakayama	Satsuki Sho	1	2,000 m (Firm)	18	1	1.6 (1)	1st	R1:59.0	–0.6	Katsumi Minai	(Sakura Super O)
May 29, 1994	3	Tokyo	Tokyo Yushun	1	2,400 m (Firm)	18	17	1.2 (1)	1st	2:25.7	–0.9	Katsumi Minai	(Air Dublin)
Oct 16, 1994	3	Kyoto	Kyoto Shimbun Hai	2	2,200 m (Firm)	10	6	1.0 (1)	2nd	2:12.2	0.1	Katsumi Minai	Star Man
Nov 6, 1994	3	Kyoto	Kikuka Sho	1	3,000 m (Good)	15	4	1.7 (1)	1st	R3:04.6	–1.1	Katsumi Minai	(Yashima Sovereign)
Dec 25, 1994	3	Nakayama	Arima Kinen	1	2,500 m (Firm)	13	11	1.2 (1)	1st	2:32.2	–0.5	Katsumi Minai	(Hishi Amazon)
Mar 12, 1995	4	Hanshin	Hanshin Daishoten	2	3,000 m (Firm)	11	1	1.0 (1)	1st	3:08.2	–1.1	Katsumi Minai	(Hagino Real King)
Oct 29, 1995	4	Tokyo	Tenno Sho (Autumn)	1	2,000 m (Firm)	17	7	2.4 (1)	12th	1:59.4	0.6	Hitoshi Matoba	Sakura Chitose O
Nov 26, 1995	4	Tokyo	Japan Cup	1	2,400 m (Firm)	14	3	3.7 (1)	6th	2:25.3	0.7	Yutaka Take	Lando
Dec 24, 1995	4	Nakayama	Arima Kinen	1	2,500 m (Firm)	12	8	3.8 (2)	4th	2:34.1	0.5	Yutaka Take	Mayano Top Gun
Mar 9, 1996	5	Hanshin	Hanshin Daishoten	2	3,000 m (Firm)	10	2	2.1 (2)	1st	3:04.9	0.0	Yutaka Take	(Mayano Top Gun)
Apr 21, 1996	5	Kyoto	Tenno Sho (Spring)	1	3,200 m (Firm)	16	4	1.7 (1)	2nd	3:18.2	0.4	Katsumi Minai	Sakura Laurel
May 19, 1996	5	Chukyo	Takamatsunomiya Hai	1	1,200 m (Firm)	13	5	4.3 (2)	4th	1:08.2	0.8	Yutaka Take	Flower Park

== Pedigree ==
Pedigree of Narita Brian (JPN), dark bay, 1991
Sire Brian's Time (USA) 1985	Roberto (USA); 1969	Hail To Reason	Turn-To
Sire Brian's Time (USA) 1985	Roberto (USA); 1969	Hail To Reason	Nothirdchance
Sire Brian's Time (USA) 1985	Roberto (USA); 1969	Bramalea	Nashua
Sire Brian's Time (USA) 1985	Roberto (USA); 1969	Bramalea	Rarelea
Sire Brian's Time (USA) 1985	Kelly's Day (USA); 1977	Graustark	Ribot
Sire Brian's Time (USA) 1985	Kelly's Day (USA); 1977	Graustark	Flower Bowl
Sire Brian's Time (USA) 1985	Kelly's Day (USA); 1977	Golden Trail	Hasty Road
Sire Brian's Time (USA) 1985	Kelly's Day (USA); 1977	Golden Trail	Sunny Vale
Dam Pacificus (USA) 1981	Northern Dancer (CAN); 1981	Nearctic	Nearco
Dam Pacificus (USA) 1981	Northern Dancer (CAN); 1981	Nearctic	Lady Angela
Dam Pacificus (USA) 1981	Northern Dancer (CAN); 1981	Natalma	Native Dancer
Dam Pacificus (USA) 1981	Northern Dancer (CAN); 1981	Natalma	Almahmoud
Dam Pacificus (USA) 1981	Pacific Princess (USA); 1973	Damascus	Sword Dancer
Dam Pacificus (USA) 1981	Pacific Princess (USA); 1973	Damascus	Kerala
Dam Pacificus (USA) 1981	Pacific Princess (USA); 1973	Fiji	Acropolis
Dam Pacificus (USA) 1981	Pacific Princess (USA); 1973	Fiji	Rififi (Family:13-a)

== See also ==
- List of leading Thoroughbred racehorses
- List of racehorses
