= Neo Universe =

Japanese Thoroughbred racehorse (2000–2021)

Neo Universe ネオユニヴァース
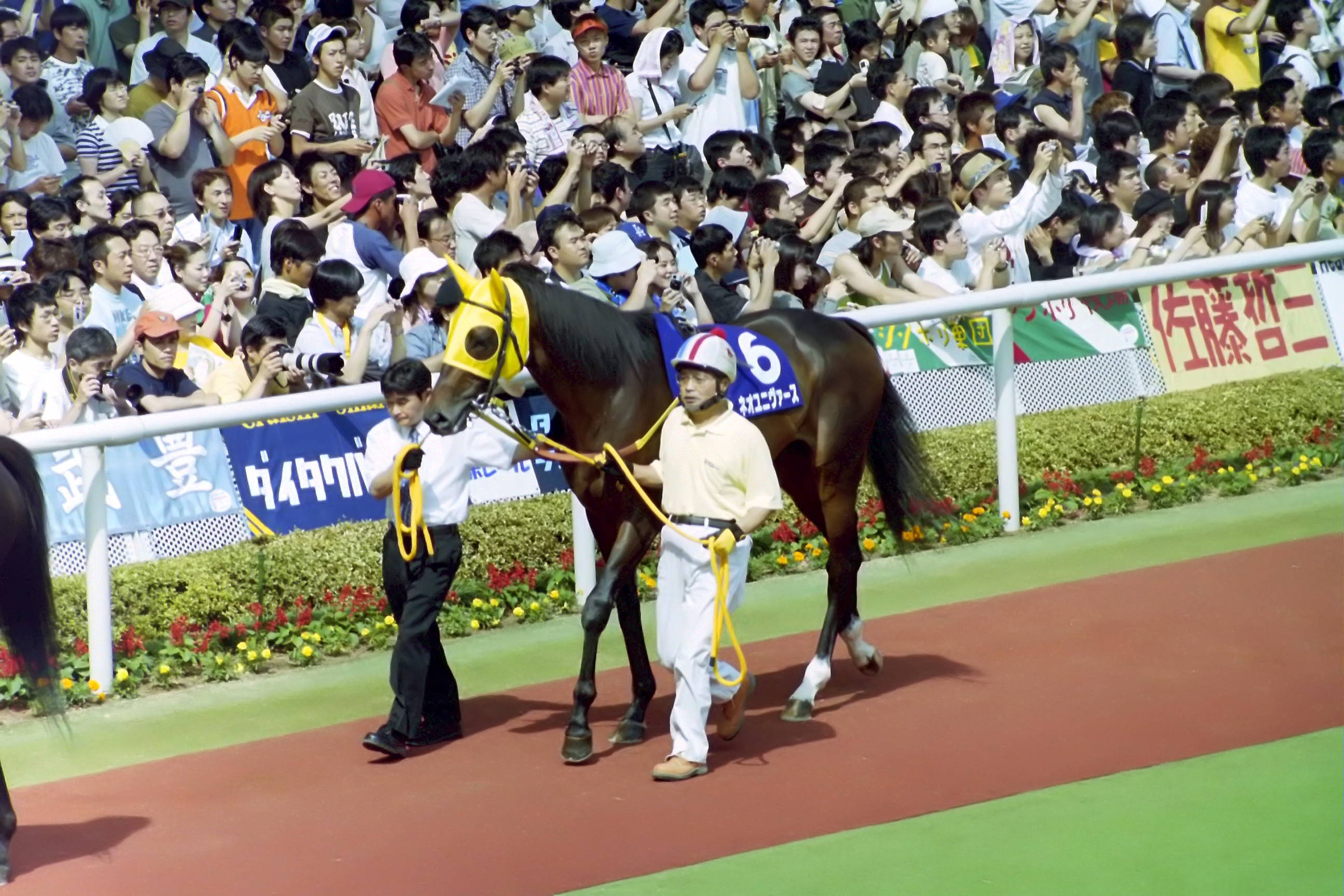
- Neo Universe at the paddock of the 2003 Takarazuka Kinen.
- Breed: Thoroughbred
- Sire: Sunday Silence (USA)
- Grandsire: Halo (USA)
- Dam: Pointed Path (GB)
- Damsire: Kris (GB)
- Sex: Stallion
- Foaled: April 21, 2000
- Died: March 8, 2021 (aged 20)
- Country: Japan
- Colour: Bay
- Breeder: Shadai Farm
- Owner: Shadai Race Horse Co.
- Racing colours
- Trainer: Tsutomu Setoguchi
- Jockey: Mirco Demuro
- Record: 13: 7-0-3
- Earnings: ¥613,376,000

Major wins
- Kisaragi Sho (2003); Spring Stakes (2003); Sankei Osaka Hai (2004); Japanese Classic Race wins: Satsuki Shō (2003); Tokyo Yūshun (2003)

Awards
- JRA Award for Best Three-Year-Old Colt (2003)

Neo Universe (Japanese: ネオユニヴァース, Hepburn: Neo Yunivāsu; May 21, 2000 - March 8, 2021) was a Japanese Thoroughbred racehorse and sire. In 2003 he won the Satsuki Shō and the Tokyo Yūshun (Japanese Derby), but was defeated when attempting to complete the Japanese Triple Crown in the Kikuka Shō. He was retired from racing after winning once in 2004 and became a successful sire of winners.

== Background ==
Neo Universe was a bay horse standing 16.2 hands high with a white star and white socks on his hind feet, bred and raced by the Shadai Farm. He was sired by Sunday Silence, who won the 1989 Kentucky Derby, before retiring to stud in Japan where he was champion sire for thirteen consecutive seasons. Neo Universe's dam was the British-bred mare Pointed Path, making him a close relative of the European Group One winners Helen Street (Irish Oaks) and Shamardal. The colt was named after a song by the Japanese rock band L'Arc-en-Ciel. The colt was sent into training with the veteran Tsutomu Setoguchi, best known for handling the Japanese Horse of the Year Oguri Cap.

== Racing career ==
=== 2002: two-year-old season ===
Neo Universe began his racing career in November 2002 when he defeated seventeen opponents in a seven furlong maiden race at Kyoto Racecourse with Yuichi Fukunaga as his jockey. A month later he finished third to Hoshi Commander over nine furlongs in the Chukyo Two-year-old Cup at Chukyo Racecourse.

=== 2003: three-year-old season ===
Neo Universe began his three-year-old season with five consecutive victories. After winning a minor race at Kyoto in January he was moved up in class and won the Group Three Kisaragi Shō at the same course a month later, beating Silent Deal by half a length. In March he was ridden for the first time by the Italian jockey Mirco Demuro in the Group Two Spring Stakes at Nakayama Racecourse and won by one and a quarter lengths from Sakura President.

On 20 April Neo Universe was made 13/5 favourite for the ten furlong Satsuki Shō (Japanese 2000 Guineas), the first leg of the Japanese Triple Crown. Ridden again by Demuro he was trapped behind other horses and appeared to be in a hopeless position, but accelerated through a narrow gap defeated Sakura President by a head after a "fierce struggle", with the previous season's champion two-year-old Eishin Champ in third place. The winner's next race was the Tokyo Yūshun over one and a half miles at Tokyo Racecourse on 1 June. The race attracted a crowd of 134,000 and Neo Universe was made clear favourite in a field of eighteen. The track was unusually wet and muddy, leading many jockeys to take their horses to the outside in search of better racing ground but Demuro kept the favourite towards the inside rail and won comfortably, beating Zenno Rob Roy by half a length with That's The Plenty three quarters of a length back in third. Demuro, who became the first foreign jockey to win the race, never had to use his whip and described Neo Universe as "unbelievable. If he did any more he'd be flying". Four weeks later, Neo Universe was matched against older horses for the first time when he was one of seventeen runners invited to contest the Takarazuka Kinen at Hanshin Racecourse. He finished fourth behind Hishi Miracle, one place ahead of the Japanese Horse of the Year Symboli Kris S.

After a summer break, Neo Universe returned in autumn in an attempt to complete the Triple Crown in the Kikuka Shō. Despite finishing third to Zenno Rob Roy in his prep race, he was made 1.3/1 favourite in a field of eighteen for the fifteen furlong classic in October. He finished third behind That's the Plenty and Lincoln, beaten three quarters of a length and a neck. On his final appearance of the season he ran in the Japan Cup at Tokyo in November. He finished fourth behind Tap Dance City, That's the Plenty and Symboli Kris S, well ahead of the Breeders' Cup winners Islington and Johar as well as the Cox Plate winner Fields of Omagh.

At the end of the season, Neo Universe was voted Japanese Champion Three-Year-Old Colt.

=== 2004: four-year-old season ===
Neo Universe remained in training as a four-year-old but made only two appearances. In April he won the Group Two Osaka Hai over ten furlongs, beating the eight-year-old gelding Magnaten by a head. In the following month he was moved up in distance to contest the spring running of the Tennō Shō over two miles and finished unplaced behind Ingrandire. Neo Universe sustained an injury to his right foreleg and was retired from racing at a ceremony at Sapporo Racecourse in September 2004.

== Racing form ==
Neo Universe won seven races in 13 starts. This data is available based on JBIS and netkeiba.

Date	Racecourse	Race	Grade	Distance (Condition)	Entry	HN	Odds (Favored)	Finish	Time	Margins	Jockey	Winner (Runner-up)
2002 – two-year-old season
Nov 9	Kyoto	2yo Newcomer		1,400 m (Firm)	18	18	2.5 (1)	1st	1:22.7	–0.2	Yuichi Fukunaga	(Mayano Chianti)
Dec 14	Chukyo	Chukyo Nisai Stakes	OP	1,800 m (Firm)	9	9	2.4 (1)	3rd	1:49.2	0.0	Kenichi Ikezoe	Hoshi Commander
2003 – three-year-old season
Nov 9	Kyoto	Shiraume Sho	ALW (1W)	1,600 m (Firm)	16	3	1.9 (1)	1st	1:35.1	–0.1	Yuichi Fukunaga	(Happy Tomorrow)
Feb 16	Kyoto	Kisaragi Sho	3	1,800 m (Soft)	14	8	8.0 (3)	1st	1:49.6	–0.1	Yuichi Fukunaga	(Silent Deal)
Mar 23	Nakayama	Spring Stakes	2	1,800 m (Firm)	16	15	2.8 (2)	1st	1:48.2	–0.2	Mirco Demuro	(Sakura President)
Apr 20	Nakayama	Satsuki Sho	1	2,000 m (Firm)	18	3	3.6 (1)	1st	2:01.2	0.0	Mirco Demuro	(Sakura President)
Jun 1	Tokyo	Tokyo Yushun	1	2,400 m (Soft)	18	13	2.6 (1)	1st	2:28.5	–0.1	Mirco Demuro	(Zenno Rob Roy)
Jun 29	Hanshin	Takarazuka Kinen	1	2,200 m (Firm)	17	6	4.4 (2)	4th	2:12.3	0.3	Mirco Demuro	Hishi Miracle
Sep 28	Hanshin	Kobe Shimbun Hai	2	2,000 m (Firm)	13	11	2.9 (2)	3rd	2:00.2	0.7	Yuichi Fukunaga	Zenno Rob Roy
Oct 26	Kyoto	Kikuka Sho	1	3,000 m (Firm)	18	17	2.3 (1)	3rd	3:05.0	0.2	Mirco Demuro	That's the Plenty
Nov 30	Tokyo	Japan Cup	1	2,400 m (Soft)	18	8	7.0 (2)	4th	2:30.3	1.6	Mirco Demuro	Tap Dance City
2004 – four-year-old season
Apr 4	Hanshin	Sankei Osaka Hai	2	2,000 m (Good)	11	5	1.8 (1)	1st	1:59.6	0.0	Mirco Demuro	(Magnaten)
May 2	Kyoto	Tenno Sho (Spring)	1	3,200 m (Firm)	18	11	4.1 (2)	10th	3:20.3	1.9	Mirco Demuro	Ingrandire

Legend:
Turf

== Stud record ==
Neo Universe was retired to become a breeding stallion at the Shadai Stallion Station in Hokkaido. He has become a leading sire in Japan, His first crop of foals produced Logi Universe (Tokyo Yūshun) and Unrivaled (Satsuki Shō) while his second included the Arima Kinen and Dubai World Cup winner Victoire Pisa. Neo Universe also sired Queen Elizabeth II Cup winner Neorealism.

In addition, Neo Universe is also the damsire of 2017 NHK Mile Cup winner Aerolithe, as well as Le Vent Se Leve, winner of the 2018 Champions Cup, as well as the 2023 UAE Derby winner Derma Sotogake.

=== Notable progeny ===
c = colt, f = filly, g = gelding
bold = Grade 1 stakes

Foaled	Name	Sex	Major Wins
2006	Italian Red	f	Kokura Kinen, Tanabata Sho, Fuchu Himba Stakes
2006	Logi Universe	c	Sapporo Nisai Stakes, Radio Nikkei Hai Nisai Stakes, Yayoi Sho, **Tokyo Yushun**
2006	Unrivaled	c	Spring Stakes, **Satsuki Sho**
2007	Gorski	c	Negishi Stakes
2007	Neo Vendome	c	Kisaragi Sho
2007	Victoire Pisa	c	Kyoto Nisai Stakes, Radio Nikkei Hai Nisai Stakes, Yayoi Sho, **Satsuki Sho**, **Arima Kinen**, Nakayama Kinen, **Dubai World Cup**
2008	All as One	c	Sapporo Nisai Stakes
2008	Fra Angelico	c	Keisei Hai Autumn Handicap
2008	Desperado	c	Stayers Stakes (2x), Kyoto Kinen
2011	Forevermore	f	Daily Hai Queen Cup
2011	Neorealism	c	Sapporo Kinen, Nakayama Kinen, **Queen Elizabeth II Cup**
2011	Omega Heart Rock	f	Fairy Stakes
2011	Sounds of Earth	c	Hanamizuki Sho
2012	Bright Emblem	c	Sapporo Nisai Stakes
2012	Sunday Wizard	c	Niigata Daishoten
2012	Westerlund	g	Antares Stakes
2013	Glanzend	c	Tokai Stakes, Leopard Stakes
2017	Sakura Toujours	g	Kyoto Kimpai, Tokyo Shimbun Hai
2018	Meisho Murakumo	c	Leopard Stakes

== In popular culture ==
An anthropomorphized version of Neo Universe appears as a character in the Japanese multimedia franchise Umamusume: Pretty Derby, voiced by Haruka Shiraishi. She is depicted as a strange girl with an interest in outer space, as well as being one of the two characters aware of the true nature of Umamusume being reincarnations of real-world racehorses, with the other being Stay Gold. She has an unusually cryptic manner of speaking, consisting of words in English quotation marks for space-related terms, emotional terms in Japanese quotation, and made-up four-letter acronyms with subtle implications. She also has knowledge of the many divergent timelines depicted as the game's career modes, and travels between them to give the player trainer advice on how to help her friends accomplish their own happy endings.

== Pedigree ==
Pedigree of Neo Universe (JPN), bay horse 2000
Sire Sunday Silence (USA) 1986	Halo (USA); 1969	Hail to Reason	Turn-To
Sire Sunday Silence (USA) 1986	Halo (USA); 1969	Hail to Reason	Nothirdchance
Sire Sunday Silence (USA) 1986	Halo (USA); 1969	Cosmah	Cosmic Bomb
Sire Sunday Silence (USA) 1986	Halo (USA); 1969	Cosmah	Almahmoud
Sire Sunday Silence (USA) 1986	Wishing Well (USA); 1975	Understanding	Promised Land
Sire Sunday Silence (USA) 1986	Wishing Well (USA); 1975	Understanding	Pretty Ways
Sire Sunday Silence (USA) 1986	Wishing Well (USA); 1975	Mountain Flower	Montparnasse
Sire Sunday Silence (USA) 1986	Wishing Well (USA); 1975	Mountain Flower	Edel Weiss
Dam Pointed Path (JPN) 1984	Kris (GB); 1976	Sharpen Up	Atan
Dam Pointed Path (JPN) 1984	Kris (GB); 1976	Sharpen Up	Rocchetta
Dam Pointed Path (JPN) 1984	Kris (GB); 1976	Doubly Sure	Reliance
Dam Pointed Path (JPN) 1984	Kris (GB); 1976	Doubly Sure	Soft Angels
Dam Pointed Path (JPN) 1984	Silken Way (USA); 1973	Shantung	Sicambre
Dam Pointed Path (JPN) 1984	Silken Way (USA); 1973	Shantung	Barley Corn
Dam Pointed Path (JPN) 1984	Silken Way (USA); 1973	Boulevard	Pall Mall
Dam Pointed Path (JPN) 1984	Silken Way (USA); 1973	Boulevard	Costa Sola (Family 1-l)
