= That's the Plenty =

Japanese Thoroughbred racehorse (2000–2021)

That's the Plenty ザッツザプレンティ
- Breed: Thoroughbred
- Sire: Dance in the Dark
- Grandsire: Sunday Silence
- Dam: Bubble Propsector
- Damsire: Miswaki
- Sex: Stallion
- Foaled: 26 May 2000
- Country: Japan
- Colour: Bay
- Breeder: Shadai Farm
- Owner: Shadai Race Horse Co.
- Racing colours
- Trainer: Kojiro Hashiguchi
- Jockey: Katsumi Ando
- Record: 16: 3-3-2
- Earnings: 408,360,000 JPY

Major wins
- Radio Tampa Hai Nisai Stakes (2002); Japanese Classic Race wins: Kikuka Sho (2003)

That's the Plenty (Japanese: ザッツザプレンティ; foaled 26 May 2000) is a Japanese Thoroughbred racehorse and sire. He was labelled as one of the top stayer of his generation, as shown as in the occasion where he won the 2003 Kikuka Sho, thus denying his teammate, Neo Universe from achieving the classic triple crown.

== Background ==
That's the Plenty was foaled out of Bubble Prospector, a mare that won one out of seven starts who was also foaling Manic Sunday (2000 Flora Stakes) and a dam dam dam to 2012 Tokyo Yushun winner, Deep Brillante. His reputation as future stayer was noted as he was sired by Dance in the Dark, the 1996 Kikuka Sho winner, who's in turned siring two more future Kikuka Sho winner in Delta Blues (2004) and Three Rolls (2009).

He was named based on the saying of "This is Brilliant!" or "This is the Best!".

== Racing career ==
=== 2002: two-year-old season ===
That's the Plenty make his debut on a 2000 metres race on Kyoto Racecourse, in which he won. Next, he ran at the Kyoto Nisai Stakes where he maintained his position at the front group between third and fourth position but losing out at the final straight by three-quarters-of-a-length behind the winner, Eishin Champ. The next race he participated would be the Radio Tampa Hai Nisai Stakes at Hanshin Racecourse in December. In this race, he won comfortably by four lengths over Chikara Teio on a heavy track.

=== 2003: three-year-old season ===
His first of the year was the Satsuki Sho qualifying race which would be the Yayoi Sho. Despite being ridden by Yutaka Take in this race, That's the Plenty did not performed well and only finished in sixth place, losing once again to Eishin Champ. This poor of form continued on the in the Satsuki Sho as he only managed to finish in eighth place as he was ridden for the first time by his eventual main jockey, Katsumi Ando. In June, he performed better at the Tokyo Yushun as he managed to pull out a run from the back of the field at tenth position towards the front group as the race went on, finishing in third place behind Neo Universe and Zenno Rob Roy. He was rested until September when he rejoined at the Kobe Shimbun Hai, the trial race for the Kikuka Sho. In this race, Ando did a totally different strategy as he pushed That's the Plenty to be at the front two and briefly took the lead before gassing out at the final straight, ended up in fifth place. With enough winning prizes total, he was qualified to race at the Kikuka Sho in October and would be starting from gate 8. When the gates opened, Silk Champion and T M Tenrai took the lead, while Zenno Rob Roy, Neo Universe, Sakura President, and That's the Plenty were in the middle of the pack. From the backstretch, he joined the leading group, and Neo Universe and others gradually advanced as well. At the fourth corner, he suddenly took the lead and pulled away from the rest of the field in the straight, with Neo Universe closing in from the outside. That's the Plenty then pulled away from Neo Universe again and held on to win the Kikuka Sho. Lincoln, who made a strong run from the far outside in the straight, overtook Neo Universe to take second place, while Neo Universe came in third, and the second favorite Zenno Rob Roy came in fourth. This was the third G1 victory for Hashiguchi (his trainer), the second G1 win in Katsumi Ando career after the 2003 Takamatsunomiya Kinen with Believe and also preventing Neo Universe from achieving the triple crown for the year. One month later, he ran at the Japan Cup where he was the best among the rest in second place as all the competitors were stunned by Tap Dance City who went wire to wire and finished first at the line by nine lengths over the rest. He finished the year with a run at the Arima Kinen, where he and Active Bio set up the pace early on and eventually get caught up in the ending phase in which he finished in 11th-place.

=== 2004: four-year-old season ===
He started the year with a run at the Hanshin Daishoten as a preparation for the Spring Tenno Sho. When the race began, he positioned himself at the middle pack before moving up with Lincoln before the fourth corner. At the final straight, he had a drag race with Lincoln to the finish line, where the final outcome was he placed second by one-and-a-quarter lengths behind Lincoln. At the Spring Tenno Sho, That's the Plenty would start from gate 1, the innermost gate. Despite having a good gate and becoming the third favourite, That's the Plenty and the others got caught up by Ingrandire who decided to went wire-to-wire. He himself finished the race as the back marker in 16th-place. A month later, he raced at the Kinko Sho. In this race, he ran better than previous outing in which he placed in third, two-and-half-lengths behind Tap Dance City, who went on back to back in this race and set up a new record. At the end of the spring campaign, That's the Plenty was chosen to run in the Takarazuka Kinen in which he would be starting from gate 5. He finished in fifth place on that day behind Tap Dance City, Silk Famous, Lincoln and Zenno Rob Roy. After the race, he went back to Shadai Farm, where he developed tendonitis on his right foreleg, which would subsided him for the remaining year.

=== 2005: five-year-old season ===
That's the Plenty returned to racing at the Osaka-Hamburg Cup, an open race at Hanshin Racecourse. In this race, That's the Plenty who was ridden by Kenichi Ikezoe went to the front group and dueled with Big Gold for the lead. At the final straight, he lost the duel and ended up falling two places from second to fourth-place at the line. At the Spring Tenno Sho, That's the Plenty only managed to finished in tenth-place. After finishing the race, That's the Plenty shown signs of swelling in his right foreleg which meant the tendonitis injury recurred again. This occasion made Shadai to retire him from racing and his name would be deregistered from JRA on 7th of May.

== Racing form ==
That's the Plenty won three races and scored five more podiums out of 16 starts. This data is available based on JBIS and netkeiba.

Date	Racecourse	Race	Grade	Distance (Condition)	Entry	HN	Odds (Favored)	Finish	Time	Margins	Jockey	Winner (Runner-up)
2002 – two-year-old season
Nov 2	Kyoto	2yo Newcomer		2,000 m (Firm)	10	10	17.3 (4)	1st	2:01.8	–0.6	Hiroshi Kawachi	(Suzuka Dream)
Nov 23	Kyoto	Kyoto Nisai Stakes	OP	2,000 m (Firm)	10	1	3.3 (1)	2nd	2:01.3	0.1	Hiroki Goto	Eishin Champ
Dec 21	Hanshin	Radio Tampa Hai Nisai Stakes	3	2,000 m (Heavy)	14	9	5.2 (2)	1st	2:04.5	–0.7	Hiroshi Kawachi	(Chikiri Teio)
2003 – three-year-old season
Mar 9	Nakayama	Yayoi Sho	2	2,000 m (Firm)	11	2	1.5 (1)	6th	2:02.6	0.3	Yutaka Take	Eishin Champ
Apr 20	Nakayama	Satsuki Sho	1	2,000 m (Firm)	18	11	6.6 (5)	8th	2:02.2	1.0	Katsumi Ando	Neo Universe
Jun 1	Tokyo	Tokyo Yushun	1	2,400 m (Soft)	18	18	25.4 (7)	3rd	2:28.7	0.2	Katsumi Ando	Neo Universe
Sep 28	Hanshin	Kobe Shimbun Hai	2	2,000 m (Firm)	13	5	10.0 (4)	5th	2:00.4	0.9	Katsumi Ando	Zenno Rob Roy
Oct 26	Kyoto	Kikuka Sho	1	3,000 m (Firm)	18	8	20.2 (5)	1st	3:04.8	–0.1	Katsumi Ando	(Lincoln)
Nov 30	Tokyo	Japan Cup	1	2,400 m (Soft)	18	10	14.0 (5)	2nd	2:30.2	1.5	Katsumi Ando	Tap Dance City
Dec 28	Nakayama	Arima Kinen	1	2,500 m (Firm)	12	8	8.7 (5)	11th	2:34.2	3.7	Katsumi Ando	Symboli Kris S
2004 – four-year-old season
Mar 21	Hanshin	Hanshin Daishoten	2	3,000 m (Firm)	9	6	3.0 (2)	2nd	3:08.6	0.2	Katsumi Ando	Lincoln
May 2	Kyoto	Tenno Sho (Spring)	1	3,200 m (Firm)	18	1	5.0 (3)	16th	3:20.8	2.4	Katsumi Ando	Ingrandire
May 29	Chukyo	Kinko Sho	2	2,000 m (Firm)	12	8	4.3 (2)	3rd	1:57.9	0.4	Katsumi Ando	Tap Dance City
Jun 27	Hanshin	Takarazuka Kinen	1	2,200 m (Firm)	15	5	10.8 (5)	5th	2:12.0	0.9	Mirco Demuro	Tap Dance City
2005 – five-year-old season
Apr 9	Hanshin	Osaka-Hamburg Cup	OP	2,500 m (Firm)	12	6	3.6 (1)	4th	2:32.7	0.2	Mirco Demuro	Big Gold
May 1	Kyoto	Tenno Sho (Spring)	1	3,200 m (Firm)	18	1	11.8 (7)	10th	3:17.3	0.8	Yasunari Iwata	Suzuka Mambo

Legend:
Turf

== Stud record ==
That's the Plenty stood as a stud in Rex Stud from 2007 until 2010. In his career as a stud, he bred with 91 mares, produced 64 progenies, registered 61 of them, earned 244,333,000 ¥ in progeny winnings with AEI of 0.35.

He was gelded and became a riding horse at Northern Horse Park in Tomakomai, Hokkaido. Since 2017, he was included in the retired racehorse preservation and exhibition program and lived out the rest of his life at the Nanporo Riding Park in Sorachi District, Hokkaido.

== Pedigree ==
Pedigree of That's the Plenty (JPN), bay stallion, 2000
Sire Dance in the Dark (JPN) B. 1993	Sunday Silence (USA)	Halo (USA)	Hail to Reason (USA)
Sire Dance in the Dark (JPN) B. 1993	Sunday Silence (USA)	Halo (USA)	Cosmah (USA)
Sire Dance in the Dark (JPN) B. 1993	Sunday Silence (USA)	Wishing Well (USA)	Understanding(USA)
Sire Dance in the Dark (JPN) B. 1993	Sunday Silence (USA)	Wishing Well (USA)	Mountain Flower (USA)
Sire Dance in the Dark (JPN) B. 1993	Dancing Key (USA)	Nijinsky (CAN)	Northern Dancer (CAN)
Sire Dance in the Dark (JPN) B. 1993	Dancing Key (USA)	Nijinsky (CAN)	Flaming Page (CAN)
Sire Dance in the Dark (JPN) B. 1993	Dancing Key (USA)	Key Partner (USA)	Key to the Mint (USA)
Sire Dance in the Dark (JPN) B. 1993	Dancing Key (USA)	Key Partner (USA)	Native Partner (USA)
Dam Bubble Prospector (USA) Ch. 1984 F.no: 1-b	Miswaki (USA)	Mr. Prospector (USA)	Raise a Native (USA)
Dam Bubble Prospector (USA) Ch. 1984 F.no: 1-b	Miswaki (USA)	Mr. Prospector (USA)	Gold Digger (USA)
Dam Bubble Prospector (USA) Ch. 1984 F.no: 1-b	Miswaki (USA)	Hopespringseternal (USA)	Buckpasser (USA)
Dam Bubble Prospector (USA) Ch. 1984 F.no: 1-b	Miswaki (USA)	Hopespringseternal (USA)	Rose Bower (USA)
Dam Bubble Prospector (USA) Ch. 1984 F.no: 1-b	Bubble Company (FR)	Lyphard (USA)	Northern Dancer (CAN)
Dam Bubble Prospector (USA) Ch. 1984 F.no: 1-b	Bubble Company (FR)	Lyphard (USA)	Goofed (USA)
Dam Bubble Prospector (USA) Ch. 1984 F.no: 1-b	Bubble Company (FR)	Prodice (FR)	Prominer (IRE)
Dam Bubble Prospector (USA) Ch. 1984 F.no: 1-b	Bubble Company (FR)	Prodice (FR)	Euridice (FR)

- That's the Plenty is an inbred of 4 x 5 to Raise a Native (Native Partner's sire) and 4 x 4 to Northern Dancer.
