= Rose Kingdom =

Japanese-bred Thoroughbred racehorse

Rose Kingdom ローズキングダム
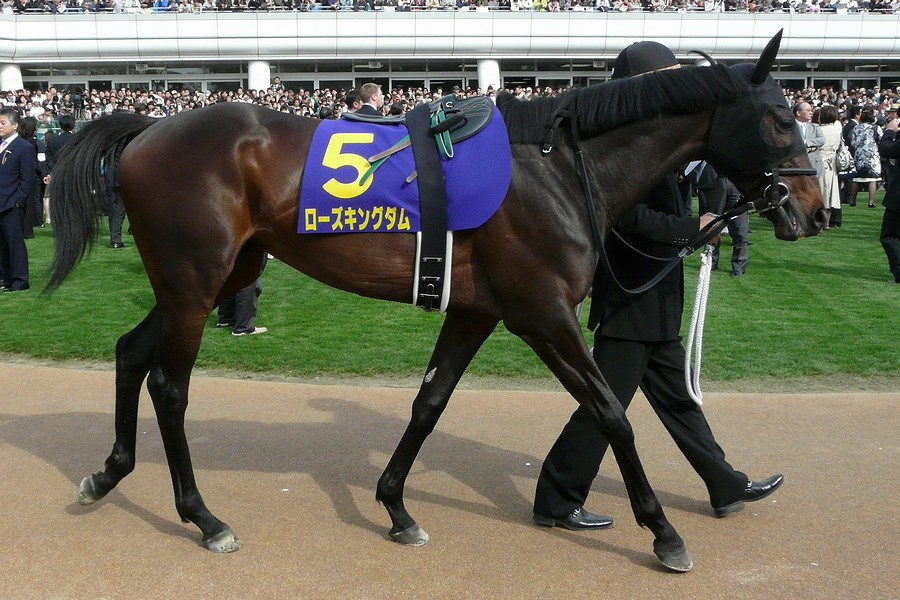
- Rose Kingdom in April 2010
- Breed: Thoroughbred
- Sire: King Kamehameha
- Grandsire: Kingmambo
- Dam: Rosebud
- Damsire: Sunday Silence
- Sex: Stallion
- Foaled: May 10, 2007 (age 19)
- Country: Japan
- Colour: Bay
- Breeder: Northern Farm
- Owner: Sunday Racing Co Ltd
- Racing colours
- Trainer: Kojiro Hashiguchi
- Jockey: Futoshi Komaki; Yutaka Take
- Record: 25: 6-2-3
- Earnings: ¥694,668,000

Major wins
- Tokyo Sports Hai Nisai Stakes (2009); Asahi Hai Futurity Stakes (2009); Kobe Shimbun Hai (2010); Japan Cup (2010); Kyoto Daishoten (2011)

Awards
- JRA Award for Best Two-Year-Old Colt (2009)

Rose Kingdom (Japanese: ローズキングダム, Hepburn: Rōzu Kingudamu; foaled May 10, 2007) is a retired Japanese Thoroughbred racehorse and former sire. In a racing career which lasted from 2009 until 2013, he won six of his twenty-five races. As a two-year-old in 2009, he was undefeated in three races and was voted Japanese Champion two-year-old colt. In the following year he won the Kobe Shimbun Hai and finished second in both the Tokyo Yushun and the Kikuka Sho before being awarded the Japan Cup on the disqualification of Buena Vista. He won only once in sixteen subsequent starts and was retired from racing in 2013.

== Background ==
Rose Kingdom is a dark bay or brown horse with a small white star standing 1.63 metres bred in Japan by Northern Farm. His sire, King Kamehameha was one of the best Japanese colts of his generation, beating a field including Heart's Cry and Daiwa Major in the 2004 Japanese Derby. His other winners as a breeding stallion include Lord Kanaloa, Lovely Day, Belshazzar (Japan Cup Dirt), Rulership (Queen Elizabeth II Cup) and Apapane. Rose Kingdom's dam Rosebud won three races including the Grade II Fillies' Revue and finished second in the Oka Sho, Yushun Himba and Queen Elizabeth II Commemorative Cup. She was a descendant of the Poule d'Essai des Pouliches winner Riverqueen.

During his racing career Rose Kingdom was owned by the Sunday Racing Co Ltd and was trained by Kojiro Hashiguchi.

== Racing career ==
=== 2009: two-year-old season ===
On his racecourse debut, Rose Kingdom contested a maiden race over 1800 metres at Kyoto Racecourse on 25 October and won from Victoire Pisa and nine others. In the following month he was stepped up in class for the Grade III Tokyo Sports Hai Nisai Stakes and won from Tosen Phantom. On 20 December, Rose Kingdom was moved up to Grade I class for Japan's most prestigious race for two-year-olds, the Asahi Hai Futurity Stakes over 1600 metres at Nakayama Racecourse. Ridden by the 42-year-old Futoshi Komaki, he won by one and a quarter lengths from Eishin Apollon (later to win the Mile Championship) with Daiwa Barbarian two lengths back in third. After the race Komaki explained "He was very relaxed from the moment he set foot on the course today... He's such an easy ride and I just hope I can keep winning the big races with him. At my age, I'm a veteran in most people's eyes, but I haven't won that many big races yet".

In the JRA Awards for 2009, Rose Kingdom was awarded the title of Japanese Champion two-year-old colt taking 285 of the 287 votes.

=== 2010: three-year-old season ===
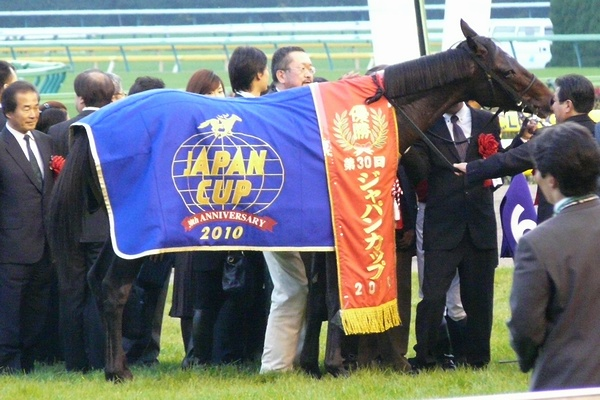
Rose Kingdom after the 2010 Japan Cup

On his first appearance as a three-year-old Rose Kingdom sustained his first defeat when he finished third behind Aliseo and Gestalt in the Grade II Fuji TV Sho Spring Stakes over 1800 metres at Nakayama on 21 March. In April he contested the Grade I Satsuki Sho over 2000 metres and finished fourth behind Victoire Pisa, Hiruno d'Amour and Eishin Flash. On 30 May he was one of seventeen colts to contest the Tokyo Yushun and finished second by a neck to Eishin Flash with Victoire Pisa in third.

After a break of almost four months, Rose Kingdom returned in the Grade II Kobe Shimbun Hai over 2400 metres at Hanshin Racecourse on 26 September. Ridden by Yutaka Take he recorded his first win of the year as he defeated Eishin Flash by a neck with Big Week three length back in third place. In the Grade I Kikuka Sho at Kyoto on 24 October, Rose Kingdom was moved up in distance to 3000 metres and finished second to Big Week, with Beat Black in third.

The 30th running of the Japan Cup in front of 106,322 at Tokyo on 28 November attracted eighteen runners and Rose Kingdom, ridden by Take, started the 7.8/1 second favourite behind Buena Vista (a filly also owned by Sunday Racing) and the three-year-old filly Pelusa. The overseas challenge comprised Fifty Proof from Canada, Voila Ici (Premio Roma, Gran Premio di Milano) from Italy, Cirrus des Aigles, Marinous (Grand Prix de Deauville) and Timos from France, Joshua Tree from Ireland and Dandino (King George V Stakes) from Britain. The other Japanese-trained runners included Nakayama Festa, Eishin Flash, Oken Bruce Lee (2008 Kikuka Sho) and Jaguar Mail (Tenno Sho spring). Take settled the colt in fifth place and switched from the rail position to make a challenge on the outside in the straight. He was bumped when Buena Vista cut to the inside but recovered to take second place, one and three quarter lengths behind the filly and a nose ahead of Victoire Pisa. After a 24-minute stewards inquiry Buena Vista was disqualified for causing interference and the race was awarded to Rose Kingdom. His trainer admitted to having "mixed feelings" about the result but praised the colt saying "being bumped a few times didn't faze him, and he put in another effort even after that to finish second. He's always had guts but the determination he showed today was amazing."

Plans to for the colt to end his season in the Arima Kinen were abandoned when he developed colic two days before the race.

In the JRA Awards for 2010, Rose Kingdom finished second to Victoire Pisa in the voting for Japanese Champion three-year-old colt.

=== 2011: four-year-old season ===
Rose Kingdom began his four-year-old season by finishing third to Rulership in a Grade II race at Kyoto in January and then finished third again in the Grade II Nikkei Sho at Hanshin in April. When moved back up to Grade I class he finished down the field behind Hiruno d'Amour in the spring running of the Tenno Sho and then ran fourth to Earnestly in the Takarazuka Kinen. He started his autumn campaign in the Grade II Kyoto Daishoten on 9 October. Ridden by Hiroki Goto, he was made the odds-on favourite and won from Beat Black, Oken Bruce Lee and Jaguar Mail. Goto commented: "I think he has grown up and he feels better than he did when I rode him to finish second in last year's Derby."

Rose Kingdom made little subsequent impact that year, finishing unplaced in the autumn Tenno Sho, the Japan Cup and the Arima Kinen.

=== 2012 & 2013: later career ===
Rose Kingdom remained in training for two further seasons, competing in many of Japan's top races, but had no further successes. In 2012 he managed one fourth place from six starts, but in the following year he finished well down the field in both of his races as a six-year-old.

== Stud record ==
Rose Kingdom was retired from racing to become a breeding stallion. For the 2015 season he was based at the Breeders Stallion Station. In 2018, Rose Kingdom suffered a head injury that left him unable to stand stud, resulting in him being retired and pensioned at the Versailles Farm.

On September 15, 2019, the manes of Rose Kingdom and Taiki Shuttle, a fellow JRA Champion pensioned at Versailles Farm at the time, were mysteriously cut by an unknown person. It appeared that a sharp tool had been used to cut the hair, but the horses were otherwise unharmed. The farm filed a report with the Hokkaido Police and ceased visitation to the farm for security and investigative purposes. The suspect, 55 year old Kazuyo Tanaka from Kawaguchi, Saitama, was arrested the following year.

== In popular culture ==
An anthropomorphized version of Rose Kingdom appears as a character in the Japanese multimedia franchise Umamusume: Pretty Derby, voiced by Yurina Kikuchi. A scion of the wealthy Rose racing family, Rose Kingdom carries her family name and reputation with a dignified and noble bearing. She admires Tanino Gimlet and is fascinated by her mannerisms to the point of keeping a notebook of the language Gimlet uses in an attempt to better understand her. In turn, Gimlet teaches Rose about destroying fences, reflecting her real-world counterpart imitating his stablemate's fence-kicking habits. Her character and costume design is a collective reference to the shoujo historical manga The Rose of Versailles by Riyoko Ikeda, as drawn from both Rose Kingdom's name and the fact that the real-life horse was one of the first resident retirees of the Versailles Resort Farm in Hokkaido, Japan.

== Racing form ==
The following racing form is based on information available on JBIS and Netkeiba

Date	Track	Race	Grade	Distance (Condition)	Entry	HN	Odds	Finish	Time	Margins	Jockey	Winner (Runner-up)
2009 – two-year-old season
Oct 25	Kyoto	2YO Debut		1,800m (Firm)	11	1	2.2	1st	1:48.9	–0.1	Futoshi Komaki	(Victoire Pisa)
Nov 21	Tokyo	Tokyo Sports Hai Nisai Stakes	3	1,800m (Firm)	17	14	3.6	1st	1:48.2	0.0	Futoshi Komaki	(Tosen Phantom)
Dec 20	Nakayama	Asahi Hai Futurity Stakes	1	1,600m (Firm)	16	8	2.3	1st	1:34.0	–0.2	Futoshi Komaki	(Eishin Apollon)
2010 – three-year-old season
Mar 21	Nakayama	Spring Stakes	2	1,800m (Firm)	15	3	1.4	3rd	1:48.4	0.2	Futoshi Komaki	Aliseo
Apr 18	Nakayama	Satsuki Sho	1	2,000m (Good)	18	5	6.4	4th	2:01.0	0.2	Futoshi Komaki	Victoire Pisa
May 30	Tokyo	Tokyo Yushun	1	2,400m (Firm)	17	8	19.5	2nd	2:26.9	0.0	Hiroki Goto	Eishin Flash
Sep 26	Hanshin	Kobe Shimbun Hai	2	2,400m (Firm)	12	3	3.0	1st	2:25.9	0.0	Yutaka Take	(Eishin Flash)
Oct 24	Kyoto	Kikuka Sho	1	3,000m (Firm)	18	10	2.1	2nd	3:06.3	0.2	Yutaka Take	Big Week
Nov 28	Tokyo	Japan Cup	1	2,400m (Firm)	18	6	8.8	*1st	2:25.2	0.3	Yutaka Take	(Buena Vista)
Dec 26	Nakayama	Arima Kinen	1	2,500m (Firm)	15	6	–	Scratched	–	–	Yutaka Take	Victoire Pisa
2011 – four-year-old season
Jan 16	Kyoto	Nikkei Shinshun Hai	2	2,400m (Firm)	13	5	2.0	3rd	2:24.9	0.3	Yutaka Take	Rulership
Apr 2	Hanshin	Nikkei Sho	2	2,400m (Firm)	10	9	2.4	3rd	2:25.9	0.5	Yutaka Take	To the Glory
May 1	Kyoto	Tenno Sho (Spring)	1	3,200m (Good)	18	4	4.2	11th	3:22.0	1.4	Yutaka Take	Hiruno d'Amour
Jun 26	Hanshin	Takarazuka Kinen	1	2,200m (Firm)	16	9	12.1	4th	2:10.4	0.3	Craig Williams	Earnestly
Oct 9	Kyoto	Kyoto Daishoten	2	2,400m (Firm)	8	7	1.8	1st	2:24.1	–0.2	Hiroki Goto	(Beat Black)
Oct 30	Tokyo	Tenno Sho (Autumn)	1	2,000m (Firm)	18	11	6.6	10th	1:57.5	1.4	Ioritz Mendizabal	Tosen Jordan
Nov 27	Tokyo	Japan Cup	1	2,400m (Firm)	16	3	22.0	9th	2:25.0	0.8	Ioritz Mendizabal	Buena Vista
Dec 25	Nakayama	Arima Kinen	1	2,500m (Firm)	13	8	51.1	12th	2:37.1	1.1	Hiroki Goto	Orfevre
2012 – five-year-old season
Apr 1	Hanshin	Sankei Osaka Hai	2	2,000m (Good)	12	8	6.8	4th	2:05.9	0.4	Hiroki Goto	Shonan Mighty
Apr 29	Kyoto	Tenno Sho (Spring)	1	3,200m (Firm)	18	14	44.6	15th	3:15.9	2.1	Hiroki Goto	Beat Black
Jun 3	Tokyo	Yasuda Kinen	1	1,600m (Firm)	18	16	14.2	13th	1:32.2	0.9	Yutaka Take	Strong Return
Oct 8	Kyoto	Kyoto Daishoten	2	2,400m (Firm)	13	8	3.6	6th	2:23.6	0.2	Futoshi Komaki	Meisho Kampaku
Nov 25	Tokyo	Japan Cup	1	2,400m (Firm)	17	12	48.2	16th	2:25.4	2.3	Yutaka Take	Gentildonna
Dec 23	Nakayama	Arima Kinen	1	2,500m (Firm)	16	1	51.6	12th	2:33.6	1.7	Yasunari Iwata	Gold Ship
2013 – six-year-old season
Mar 31	Hanshin	Sankei Osaka Hai	2	2,000m (Firm)	14	13	116.9	12th	2:00.2	1.2	Yuga Kawada	Orfevre
May 5	Niigata	Niigata Daishoten	3	2,000m (Firm)	16	9	18.6	11th	1:58.2	1.3	Daisaku Matsuda	Passion Dance

- *Promoted to 1st as Buena Vista being demoted due to impediment violation.

== Pedigree ==
Pedigree of Rose Kingdom (JPN), bay or brown horse, 2007
Sire King Kamehameha (JPN) 2001	Kingmambo (USA); 1990	Mr. Prospector	Raise a Native
Sire King Kamehameha (JPN) 2001	Kingmambo (USA); 1990	Mr. Prospector	Gold Digger
Sire King Kamehameha (JPN) 2001	Kingmambo (USA); 1990	Miesque	Nureyev
Sire King Kamehameha (JPN) 2001	Kingmambo (USA); 1990	Miesque	Pasadoble
Sire King Kamehameha (JPN) 2001	Manfath (IRE); 1991	Last Tycoon	Try My Best
Sire King Kamehameha (JPN) 2001	Manfath (IRE); 1991	Last Tycoon	Mill Princess
Sire King Kamehameha (JPN) 2001	Manfath (IRE); 1991	Pilot Bird	Blakeney
Sire King Kamehameha (JPN) 2001	Manfath (IRE); 1991	Pilot Bird	The Dancer
Dam Rosebud (JPN) 1998	Sunday Silence (USA); 1986	Halo	Hail To Reason
Dam Rosebud (JPN) 1998	Sunday Silence (USA); 1986	Halo	Cosmah
Dam Rosebud (JPN) 1998	Sunday Silence (USA); 1986	Wishing Well	Understanding
Dam Rosebud (JPN) 1998	Sunday Silence (USA); 1986	Wishing Well	Mountain Flower
Dam Rosebud (JPN) 1998	Rose Colour (JPN); 1993	Shirley Heights	Mill Reef
Dam Rosebud (JPN) 1998	Rose Colour (JPN); 1993	Shirley Heights	Hardiemma
Dam Rosebud (JPN) 1998	Rose Colour (JPN); 1993	Rosa Nay	Lyphard
Dam Rosebud (JPN) 1998	Rose Colour (JPN); 1993	Rosa Nay	Riviere d'Oree (family: 1-w)
