= Logi Universe =

Japanese Thoroughbred racehorse

Logi Universe; ロジユニヴァース
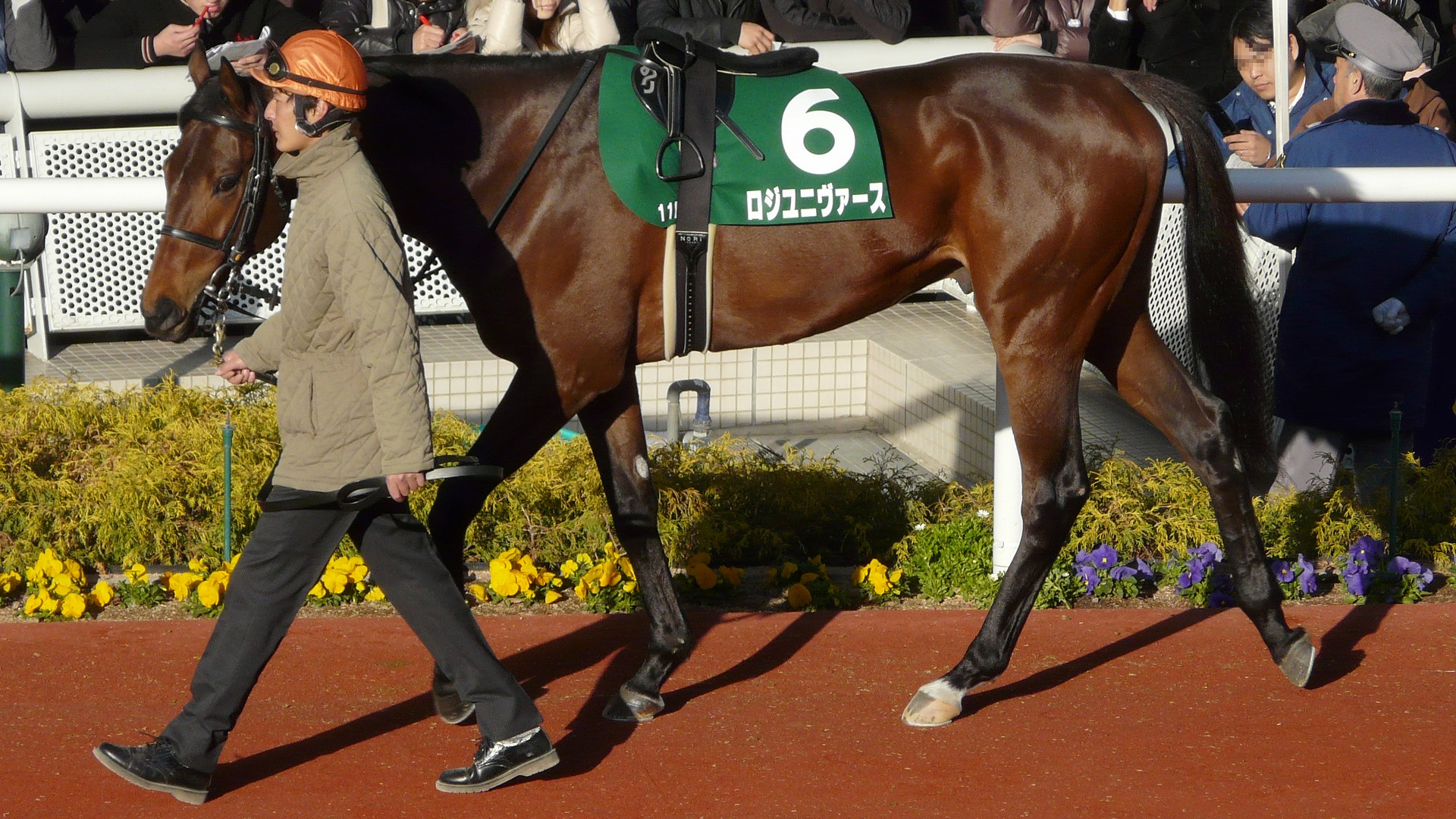
- Logi Universe in December 2008
- Sire: Neo Universe
- Grandsire: Sunday Silence
- Dam: Acoustics
- Damsire: Cape Cross
- Sex: Stallion
- Foaled: March 11 2006
- Country: Japan
- Colour: Bay
- Breeder: Northern Farm
- Owner: Masaaki Kumeta
- Racing colours
- Trainer: Kiyoshi Hagiwara
- Jockey: Norihiro Yokoyama
- Record: 10: 5-1-0
- Earnings: ¥343,323,000

Major wins
- Sapporo Nisai Stakes (2008); Radio Nikkei Hai Nisei Stakes (2008); Yayoi Sho (2009); Japanese Classic Race wins: Tokyo Yushun (2009)

Awards
- JRA Award for Best Three-Year-Old Colt (2009)

Logi Universe (Japanese ロジユニヴァース foaled March 11 2006) is a Japanese Thoroughbred racehorse and sire. As a juvenile in 2008 he was unbeaten in three races including Grade 3 successes in the Sapporo Nisai Stakes, Radio Nikkei Hai Nisei Stakes. In the following spring, he won the Yayoi Sho and then rebounded from his first defeat to win the Tokyo Yushun by four lengths. At the end of the season he won the JRA Award for Best Three-Year-Old Colt. His subsequent racing career was plagued by injury and he ran only four times in the next three years before being retired to stud.

== Background ==
Logi Universe is a bay horse bred in Japan by Northern Farm. His sire Neo Universe, a son of the thirteen-time leading sire in Japan Sunday Silence, was a successful Japanese performer, winning the Satsuki Shō and the Tokyo Yūshun, the first two legs of the Japanese Triple Crown in 2003. At stud he has also sired Victoire Pisa and the Satsuki Shō winner Unrivaled. Logi Universe was the first foal of the unraced mare Acoustics who was a granddaughter of the leading racemare Sonic Lady. Sonic Lady was not, technically a Thoroughbred as her female ancestry could not be traced to one of the foundation mares of the breed. She was instead a member of Half-Bred Family 3 whose other members include Quashed and Attraction.

Logi Universe was trained throughout his racing career by Kiyoshi Hagawara and ridden in most of his races by Norihiro Yokoyama.

== Racing career ==
=== 2008: two-year-old season ===
Logi Universe began his racing career on 6 July at Hanshin Racecourse in a contest for previously unraced horses over 1800 metres and won from eleven opponents. After the summer break the colt was stepped up in class for the Grade 3 Sapporo Nisei Stakes at Sapporo Racecourse and won from Executive. He ended his season with a second Grade 3 victory when he took the Radio Nikkei Hai Nisei Stakes at Hanshin on 27 December.

In the polling to determine the Japanese champion juvenile colt of 2008 Logi Universe received 31 votes and finished runner-up to Seiun Wonder.

=== 2009: three-year-old season ===
On his first appearance as a three-year-old Logi Universe contested the Grade 2 Yayoi Sho (a major trial for the Satsuki Sho) in which he faced nine opponents headed by Seiun Wonder. He won by two and a half lengths from Mikki Petra with Seiun Wonder only eighth. On 19 April the colt started 7/10 favourite for the Satsuki Sho. He appeared to be well-placed on the final turn but made no impression in the straight and finished fourteenth of the eighteen runners behind Unrivaled. Hagiwara later commented "there are a number of reasons I can think of for the defeat, but we just don't have enough time to go through them one by one".

On 31 May, in front of a 110,000 crowd, Logi Universe was one of eighteen colts to contest the 76th running of the Tokyo Yushun over 2400 metres on soft ground at Tokyo Racecourse. He was made the 6.7/1 second favourite behind Unrivaled whilst the other runners included Seiun Wonder, Apres Un Reve, Reach the Crown and Nakayama Festa. He raced in third place before moving up on the inside to take the lead 400 metres from the finish. He drew away in the closing stages to win by four lengths from Reach the Crown who finished just ahead of Antonio Barows, Nakayama Festa, Apres Un Reve and Schon Wald. The result was well-received by the crowd partly as the popular veteran Yokoyama was winning the race for the first time.

It was hoped that the colt would return in autumn but he developed a muscular problem in his right hind leg and missed the rest of the season with injury. In the JRA Awards for 2009 he was named champion three-year-old colt, taking 237 of the 287 votes.

=== 2010–2012: later career ===
After a ten-month absence Logi Universe eventually returned and finished sixth in the Nikkei Sho at Nakayama in March. Katsumi Ando took the ride when the colt moved back up to the highest class for the Takarazuka Kinen. Before the race his trainer admitted that the colt was still having problems with "muscle pains" and he ran poorly to finish unplaced behind Nakayama Festa. Logi Universe showed some sign of a return to form on his third and final start of the year when he finished second to Earnestly in the Sapporo Kinen in August.

Logi Universe was off the course for two years before returning for one race as a six-year-old in 2012. He made no impact as he finished tailed-off last of the fourteen runners in the Sapporo Kinen.

== Racing form ==
Logi Universe had 5 wins with 1 second place in 15 races. The data available is based on JBIS and netkeiba.com.

Date	Track	Race	Grade	Distance (Condition)	Entry	HN	Odds (Favored)	Finish	Time	Margins	Jockey	Winner (Runner-up)
2008 – two-year-old season
Jul 6	Hanshin	2YO debut		1800m（Firm）	12	8	2.9（2）	1st	1:49.1	–0.1	Yutaka Take	(Pros and Cons)
Oct 4	Sapporo	Sapporo Nisai Stakes	3	1800m（Firm）	14	4	4.0（1）	1st	1:49.1	–0.2	Norihiro Yokoyama	(Executive)
Dec 27	Hanshin	Radio Nikkei Hai Nisai Stakes	3	2000m（Firm）	11	6	5.8（2）	1st	2:01.7	–0.7	Norihiro Yokoyama	(Reach the Crown)
2009 – three-year-old season
Mar 8	Nakayama	Yayoi Sho	2	2000m（Good）	10	10	1.3（1）	1st	2:03.5	–0.4	Norihiro Yokoyama	(Mikki Petra)
Apr 19	Nakayama	Satsuki Sho	1	2000m（Firm）	18	1	1.7（1）	14th	2:00.6	1.9	Norihiro Yokoyama	Unrivaled
May 31	Tokyo	Tokyo Yushun	1	2400m（Heavy）	18	1	7.7（2）	1st	2:33.7	–0.7	Norihiro Yokoyama	(Reach the Crown)
2010 – four-year-old season
Mar 27	Nakayama	Nikkei Sho	2	2500m（Good）	15	15	3.0（1）	6th	2:34.4	0.3	Norihiro Yokoyama	Meiner Kitz
Jun 27	Hanshin	Takarazuka Kinen	1	2200m（Good）	17	9	8.9（5）	13th	2:14.2	1.2	Katsumi Ando	Nakayama Festa
Aug 22	Sapporo	Sapporo Kinen	2	2000m（Firm）	16	10	9.2（5）	2nd	1:59.7	0.3	Norihiro Yokoyama	Earnestly
2012 – six-year-old season
Aug 19	Sapporo	Sapporo Kinen	2	2000m（Firm）	14	1	21.8（7）	14th	2:04.3	5.6	Norihiro Yokoyama	Fumino Imagine

Legend:
Turf

== Stud career ==
Logi Universe was retired from racing to become a breeding stallion at the Yushun Stallion Station in 2013.

In November 2023, Logi Universe was moved to Versailles Farm, where he would continue to stand stud there.

== Pedigree ==
Pedigree of Logi Universe (JPN), bay horse, 2006
Sire Neo Universe (JPN) 2000	Sunday Silence (USA); 1986	Halo	Hail To Reason
Sire Neo Universe (JPN) 2000	Sunday Silence (USA); 1986	Halo	Cosmah
Sire Neo Universe (JPN) 2000	Sunday Silence (USA); 1986	Wishing Well	Understanding
Sire Neo Universe (JPN) 2000	Sunday Silence (USA); 1986	Wishing Well	Mountain Flower
Sire Neo Universe (JPN) 2000	Pointed Path (GB); 1984	Kris	Sharpen Up
Sire Neo Universe (JPN) 2000	Pointed Path (GB); 1984	Kris	Doubly Sure
Sire Neo Universe (JPN) 2000	Pointed Path (GB); 1984	Silken Way	Shantung
Sire Neo Universe (JPN) 2000	Pointed Path (GB); 1984	Silken Way	Boulevard
Dam Acoustics (JPN) 2001	Cape Cross (IRE); 1994	Green Desert	Danzig
Dam Acoustics (JPN) 2001	Cape Cross (IRE); 1994	Green Desert	Foreign Courier
Dam Acoustics (JPN) 2001	Cape Cross (IRE); 1994	Park Appeal	Ahonoora
Dam Acoustics (JPN) 2001	Cape Cross (IRE); 1994	Park Appeal	Balidaress
Dam Acoustics (JPN) 2001	Soninke (GB); 1996	Machiavellian	Mr Prospector
Dam Acoustics (JPN) 2001	Soninke (GB); 1996	Machiavellian	Coup de Folie
Dam Acoustics (JPN) 2001	Soninke (GB); 1996	Sonic Lady	Nureyev
Dam Acoustics (JPN) 2001	Soninke (GB); 1996	Sonic Lady	Stumped (Family:B3)
