= Zenno Rob Roy =

Japanese-bred Thoroughbred racehorse (2000–2022)

Zenno Rob Roy ゼンノロブロイ
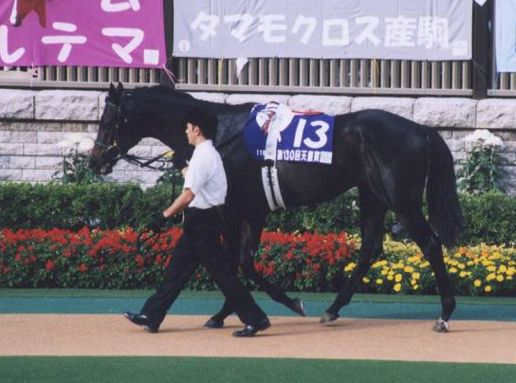
- Zenno Rob Roy at the paddock of the 2004 Autumn Tennō Shō.
- Breed: Thoroughbred
- Sire: Sunday Silence (USA)
- Grandsire: Halo (USA)
- Dam: Roamin' Rachel (USA)
- Damsire: Mining (USA)
- Sex: Stallion
- Foaled: March 27, 2000
- Died: September 2, 2022 (aged 22)
- Country: Japan
- Colour: Bay
- Breeder: Shiraoi Farm
- Owner: Shinobu Osako; Kumiko Osako
- Racing colours
- Trainer: Kazuo Fujisawa
- Jockey: Norihiro Yokoyama; Olivier Peslier
- Record: 20: 7–6–4
- Earnings: ¥1,135,651,500; JPN: ¥1,115,608,000; GB: £101,200

Major wins
- Aoba Sho (2003); Kobe Shimbun Hai (2003); Tennō Shō (Autumn) (2004); Japan Cup (2004); Arima Kinen (2004)

Awards
- JRA Award for Best Older Male Horse (2004); Japanese Horse of the Year (2004)

Zenno Rob Roy (Japanese: ゼンノロブロイ, Hepburn: Zenno Robu Roi; 27 March 2000 – 2 September 2022) was a Japanese Thoroughbred racehorse and sire. In a racing career which lasted from February 2003 until December 2005, he ran twenty times, winning seven races and being placed on ten further occasions. As a three-year-old in 2003, he won two Group 2 races and finished second in the Tokyo Yushun. His greatest success came as a four-year-old the following year when he was named Japanese Horse of the Year after winning the three all-aged Group One races which comprise Japan's Autumn Triple Crown: the autumn Tennō Shō, the Japan Cup, and the Arima Kinen. In 2005, he failed to win but was placed in the International Stakes in Britain as well as in the year's autumn Tennō Shō and Japan Cup. He was then retired to stud where he had success as a sire of winners.

== Background ==
Zenno Rob Roy was a bay horse with one white foot, standing just under 16.2 hands. He was bred in Japan by the Shiraoi Farm, from parents who had both been imported from the United States. He was sired by Sunday Silence, who won the 1989 Kentucky Derby, before retiring to stud in Japan where he was champion sire on thirteen consecutive occasions. His dam Roamin' Rachel was a successful racemare who excelled over sprint distances, winning the Grade I Ballerina Handicap in 1994 before being sold for $750,000 and exported to Japan in 1998.

== Racing career ==
=== 2003: three-year-old season ===
Zenno Rob Roy made his first appearance in a one-mile maiden race at Nakayama Racecourse in February, and won by two and a half lengths. He then finished third to Lincoln at Hanshin Racecourse before winning again at Nakayama in April. On 3 May at Tokyo Racecourse, Zenno Rob Roy recorded his first important victory when he won the one and a half mile Aoba Sho, an important trial race for the Tokyo Yushun. Over the same course and distance a month later, the colt finished second in the Tokyo Yushun, half a length behind the winner Neo Universe.

Zenno Rob Roy returned in September to win the Kobe Shimbun Hai, a trial race for the Kikuka Sho (Japanese St Leger). In the Kikuka Sho a month later he finished fourth of the eighteen runners behind That's the Plenty, Lincoln and Neo Universe after being boxed in and struggling to obtain a clear run on the turn into the straight. On his final appearance of the season, the colt was one of the twelve horses invited to contest the Arima Kinen at Nakayama on 28 December and finished third behind Symboli Kris S and Lincoln.

=== 2004: four-year-old season ===
In March 2004, Zenno Rob Roy came second to Win Generale in the Group Two Nikkei Sho and then finished second to Ingrandire in the spring running of the Tennō Shō over two miles. On 27 June he finished fourth of the fifteen runners in the Takarazuka Kinen, three lengths behind the winner Tap Dance City.

Zenno Rob Roy began his autumn campaign in the Group Two Kyoto Daishoten on 10 October, when he started the 2/5 favourite but was beaten by Narita Century. Despite his defeat the colt started favourite for the autumn running of the Tennō Shō three weeks later. Ridden for the first time by Olivier Peslier he was held up in the early stages and turned into the straight in ninth place. He made steady progress in the last quarter mile to take the lead close to the finish and won by one and a quarter lengths from the three-year-old filly Dance in the Mood. Four weeks later, Zenno Rob Roy started the 1.7/1 favourite for the Japan Cup, then the world's most valuable turf race, at Tokyo racecourse, in front of a crowd of 119,362. Peslier moved the colt up to challenge for the lead in the straight and he drew clear in the closing stages to win by three lengths from Cosmo Bulk and Delta Blues. On 26 December Zenno Rob Roy attempted to complete Japan's Autumn Triple Crown when he was one of fifteen horses invited to contest the Arima Kinen. Under a strong ride from Peslier, he overtook the front-running Tap Dance City inside the final furlong and won by half a length. The winning time of 2:29.5 was a record for the 2,500 metre race and the four-year-old's victory was enthusiastically received by the 125,000 crowd.

His performances saw him voted Champion Older Horse and Japanese Horse of the Year in January 2005.

=== 2005: five-year-old season ===
Zenno Rob Roy did not begin his five-year-old season until 26 June, when he finished third behind Sweep Tosho and Heart's Cry in the Takarazuka Kinen. He was then sent to Europe where he was lodged at the stables of Geoff Wragg at Newmarket and in August he contested the International Stakes at York Racecourse. He stayed on well in the closing stages to finish second of the seven runners, a neck behind the winner Electrocutionist in a "blanket finish".

The colt returned to Japan where he ran in all three legs of the Autumn Triple Crown. He was beaten a head by Heavenly Romance in the Tennō Shō and then ran third behind Alkaased and Heart's Cry in the Japan Cup. On his final appearance he finished unplaced behind Heart's Cry in the Arima Kinen.

== Racing form ==
Zenno Rob Roy won seven races and hit the podium 10 more times out of 20 starts. This data is available based on JBIS, netkeiba and British Horseracing Authority.

Date	Racecourse	Race	Grade	Distance (Condition)	Entry	HN	Odds (Favored)	Finish	Time	Margins	Jockey	Winner (Runner-up)
2003 – three-year-old season
Feb 9	Nakayama	3yo Newcomer		1,600 m (Good)	15	10	1.8 (1)	1st	1:37.8	–0.4	Norihiro Yokoyama	(Patience King)
Mar 2	Hanshin	Sumire Stakes	OP	2,200 m (Good)	10	5	2.8 (2)	3rd	2:17.3	0.4	Norihiro Yokoyama	Lincoln
Apr 12	Nakayama	Yamabuki Sho	ALW (1W)	2,200 m (Firm)	10	10	1.4 (1)	1st	2:14.9	–0.4	Norihiro Yokoyama	(Rubens Memory)
May 3	Tokyo	Aoba Sho	2	2,400 m (Firm)	15	11	2.3 (1)	1st	2:26.3	–0.2	Norihiro Yokoyama	(Takara Shaadi)
Jun 1	Tokyo	Tokyo Yushun	1	2,400 m (Soft)	18	3	6.4 (3)	2nd	2:28.6	0.1	Norihiro Yokoyama	Neo Universe
Sep 28	Hanshin	Kobe Shimbun Hai	2	2,000 m (Firm)	13	2	3.9 (3)	1st	1:59.5	–0.6	Kent Desormeaux	(Sakura President)
Oct 26	Kyoto	Kikuka Sho	1	3,000 m (Firm)	18	4	2.5 (2)	4th	3:05.3	0.5	Olivier Peslier	That's the Plenty
Dec 28	Nakayama	Arima Kinen	1	2,500 m (Firm)	12	2	5.9 (3)	3rd	2:32.1	1.6	Yoshitomi Shibata	Symboli Kris S
2004 – four-year-old season
Mar 27	Nakayama	Nikkei Sho	2	2,500 m (Firm)	14	6	1.1 (1)	2nd	2:32.8	0.0	Yoshitomi Shibata	Win Generale
May 2	Kyoto	Tennō Shō (Spring)	1	3,200 m (Firm)	18	16	7.7 (4)	2nd	3:19.5	1.1	Damien Oliver	Ingrandire
Jun 27	Hanshin	Takarazuka Kinen	1	2,200 m (Firm)	15	3	3.9 (2)	4th	2:11.6	0.5	Katsuharu Tanaka	Tap Dance City
Oct 10	Kyoto	Kyoto Daishoten	2	2,400 m (Firm)	10	4	1.4 (1)	2nd	2:25.2	0.0	Yukio Okabe	Narita Century
Oct 31	Tokyo	Tennō Shō (Autumn)	1	2,000 m (Good)	17	13	3.4 (1)	1st	1:58.9	–0.2	Olivier Peslier	(Dance in the Mood)
Nov 28	Tokyo	Japan Cup	1	2,400 m (Firm)	16	9	2.7 (1)	1st	2:24.2	–0.5	Olivier Peslier	(Cosmo Bulk)
Dec 26	Nakayama	Arima Kinen	1	2,500 m (Firm)	15	1	2.0 (1)	1st	R2:29.5	–0.1	Olivier Peslier	(Tap Dance City)
2005 – five-year-old season
Jun 26	Hanshin	Takarazuka Kinen	1	2,200 m (Firm)	15	6	3.0 (2)	3rd	2:11.7	0.2	Kent Desormeaux	Sweep Tosho
Aug 16	York	Juddmonte International	1	10.4 f (Good)	7	6	4/1 (2)	2nd	2:07.4	0.0	Yutaka Take	Electrocutionist
Oct 30	Tokyo	Tennō Shō (Autumn)	1	2,000 m (Firm)	18	13	2.2 (1)	2nd	2:00.1	0.0	Norihiro Yokoyama	Heavenly Romance
Nov 27	Tokyo	Japan Cup	1	2,400 m (Firm)	18	8	2.1 (1)	3rd	2:22.4	0.3	Kent Desormeaux	Alkaased
Dec 25	Nakayama	Arima Kinen	1	2,500 m (Firm)	16	3	6.8 (2)	8th	2:32.8	0.9	Kent Desormeaux	Heart's Cry

Legend:
Turf

- R on the time indicates that this was a record time

== Stud record ==
Zenno Rob Roy was retired from racing to stand as a stallion at the Shadai Stallion Station in Hokkaido and was shuttled to stand in New Zealand during the southern hemisphere breeding season. In 2007 he covered mares in Australia after being stranded there by travel restrictions following an outbreak of horse flu. His most successful runner as of his death was the Yushun Himba (Japanese Oaks) winner Saint Emilion.

Zenno Rob Roy died from heart failure on 2 September 2022.

=== Notable progeny ===
c = colt, f = filly,
bold = Grade 1 stakes

Foaled	Name	Sex	Major Wins
2007	Saint Emillion	f	**Yushun Himba**, Flora Stakes
2007	Animate Bio	f	Rose Stakes
2007	Cosmo Nemo Shin	f	Fairy Stakes, Niigata Kinen
2007	Trailblazer	c	Copa Republica Argentina, Kyoto Kinen
2007	Pelusa	c	Aoba Sho
2007	Magnifica	c	**Japan Dirt Derby**
2008	Lelouch	c	Copa Republica Argentina
2009	Namura Victor	c	Antares Stakes
2011	Lilavati	f	Mermaid Stakes
2011	Azuma Shuttle	c	Kokura Kinen
2011	Bounce Shasse	f	Flower Cup, Nakayama Himba Stakes, Aichi Hai
2011	Sang Real	f	Flora Stakes
2012	Lia Fail	c	Kobe Shimbun Hai
2012	Tanta Alegria	c	American Jockey Club Cup
2013	Maitres d'Art	c	Chunichi Shimbun Hai
2015	Satono Favor	c	Kisaragi Sho
2015	Grimm	c	Leopard Stakes

== In popular culture ==
An anthropomorphized version of Zenno Rob Roy appears as a character in the Japanese multimedia franchise Umamusume: Pretty Derby, voiced by Haruka Terui. She is depicted as a quiet, reserved, and highly imaginative bookworm who works as an assistant at Tracen Academy's library, and aspires to be a hero like the protagonist of a fantasy novel. Her race outfit and the large replica claymore she is often depicted wielding are inspired by Rob Roy Macgregor, her real-life counterpart's namesake. Her career mode focuses on a rivalry with her upperclassman and mentor Symboli Kris S, which is loosely based on their real-life counterparts' races against each other culminating in the 2003 Arima Kinen.

== Pedigree ==
Pedigree of Zenno Rob Roy (JPN), bay horse 2000
Sire Sunday Silence (USA) 1986	Halo (USA); 1969	Hail to Reason	Turn-To
Sire Sunday Silence (USA) 1986	Halo (USA); 1969	Hail to Reason	Nothirdchance
Sire Sunday Silence (USA) 1986	Halo (USA); 1969	Cosmah	Cosmic Bomb
Sire Sunday Silence (USA) 1986	Halo (USA); 1969	Cosmah	Almahmoud
Sire Sunday Silence (USA) 1986	Wishing Well (USA); 1975	Understanding	Promised Land
Sire Sunday Silence (USA) 1986	Wishing Well (USA); 1975	Understanding	Pretty Ways
Sire Sunday Silence (USA) 1986	Wishing Well (USA); 1975	Mountain Flower	Montparnasse
Sire Sunday Silence (USA) 1986	Wishing Well (USA); 1975	Mountain Flower	Edelweiss
Dam Roamin' Rachel (USA) 1990	Mining (USA); 1984	Mr. Prospector	Raise a Native
Dam Roamin' Rachel (USA) 1990	Mining (USA); 1984	Mr. Prospector	Gold Digger
Dam Roamin' Rachel (USA) 1990	Mining (USA); 1984	I Pass	Buckpasser
Dam Roamin' Rachel (USA) 1990	Mining (USA); 1984	I Pass	Impish
Dam Roamin' Rachel (USA) 1990	One Smart Lady (USA); 1984	Clever Trick	Icecapade
Dam Roamin' Rachel (USA) 1990	One Smart Lady (USA); 1984	Clever Trick	Kankakee Miss
Dam Roamin' Rachel (USA) 1990	One Smart Lady (USA); 1984	Pia's Lady	Pia Star
Dam Roamin' Rachel (USA) 1990	One Smart Lady (USA); 1984	Pia's Lady	Plucky Roman (Family 2-b)
