= Tap Dance City =

American-bred Thoroughbred racehorse

Tap Dance City タップダンスシチー
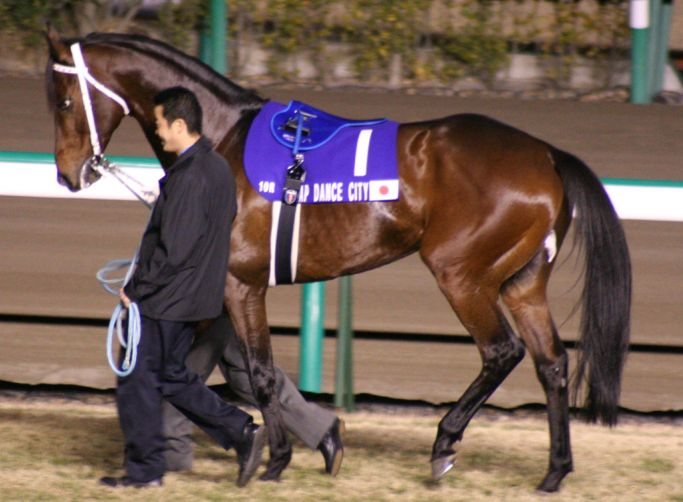
- Tap Dance City at his retirement ceremony in December 2005.
- Breed: Thoroughbred
- Sire: Pleasant Tap
- Grandsire: Pleasant Colony
- Dam: All Dance
- Damsire: Northern Dancer
- Sex: Stallion
- Foaled: March 16, 1997 (age 29)
- Country: United States
- Colour: Bay
- Breeder: Echo Valley Horse Farm & Swettenham Stud
- Owner: Yushun Horse
- Racing colours
- Trainer: Shozo Sasaki
- Jockey: Tetsuzo Sato
- Record: 42: 12-6-7
- Earnings: ¥1,084,221,000 USD$9,627,882.48

Major wins
- Asahi Challenge Cup (2002); Kinko Sho (2003, 2004, 2005); Kyoto Daishoten (2003); Japan Cup (2003); Takarazuka Kinen (2004)

Awards
- Timeform rating: 125

Tap Dance City (Japanese: タップダンスシチー, Hepburn: Tappu Dansu Shichii, foaled March 16, 1997) is a retired American-bred, Japanese-trained Thoroughbred racehorse and active sire. He showed promising form in his early racing career, winning the Asahi Challenge Cup in 2002. He reached his peak as a six-year-old in 2003 when he won the Kinko Sho and the Kyoto Daishoten before defeating a strong international field in the Japan Cup by 9 lengths, setting the record for the largest margin of victory achieved in a Japanese Grade 1 race. (Note: The record was tied by Symboli Kris S in the year's Arima Kinen) In the following year he won a second Kinko Sho and then took the Takarazuka Kinen. He won a third Kinko Sho as an eight-year-old in 2005. Tap Dance City performed consistently well throughout his career, placing in over half his races, and is the only foreign-bred horse to earn over one billion yen in Japan.

== Background ==
Tap Dance City is a bay horse bred in Kentucky by Echo Valley Horse Farm & Swettenham Stud. He was sired by the Eclipse Award winning stallion Pleasant Tap, whose other progeny included the Champion Stakes winner David Junior. His dam, All Dance, was a sister of the Kentucky Derby winner Winning Colors and produced several good winners including the leading British hurdler Ruling.

== Racing career ==
=== 2000–2002: early career ===
Tap Dance City won two of his nine races a three-year-old in 2000, but failed to win in six races in 2001. He emerged as a top-class performer in 2002 when he won the Grade 3 Asahi Challenge Cup. In December 2002, as an 85/1 outsider, he produced his best performance up to that point when he finished second to Symboli Kris S in the Grade 1 Arima Kinen at Nakayama Racecourse.

=== 2003: six-year-old season ===
Tap Dance City began his six-year-old season by winning a handicap race at Tokyo Racecourse and then won the Grade 2 Kinko Sho at Chukyo Racecourse in May. In June he finished third to Hishi Miracle in the Takarazuka Kinen, with the unplaced horses including Neo Universe, Symboli Kris S and Agnes Digital. On his return from the summer break, Tap Dance City won the Grade 2 Kyoto Daishoten, beating Hishi Miracle by one and a quarter lengths after leading from the start.

On November 30, 2003, Tap Dance City, ridden by Tetsuzo Sato, started at odds of 12.8/1 for the 22nd running of the Japan Cup at Tokyo. Apart from the Japanese contenders such as Symboli Kris S and Neo Universe, the race attracted international challengers including Islington from England, Johar from the United States and Fields of Omagh from Australia. Tap Dance City went into the lead from the start and opened up a seven length advantage with five furlongs left to run. He was never challenged and won by a record margin of nine lengths from the Kikuka Sho winner That's The Plenty, with Symboli Kris S and Neo Universe in third and fourth places.

=== 2004–2005: later career ===
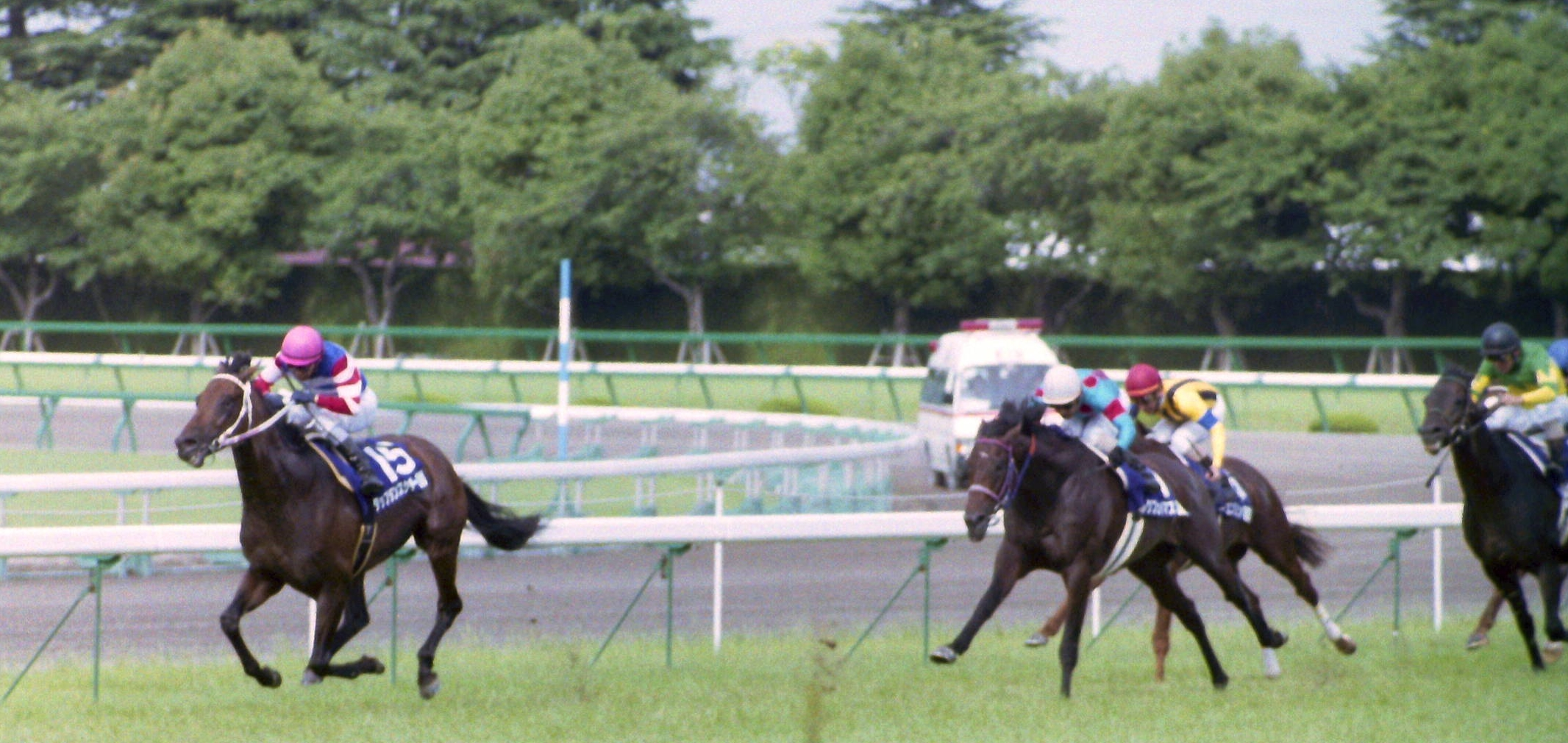
Tap Dance City at the beginning of his late surge in the 2004 Takarazuka Kinen, several lengths ahead of Silk Famous, Lohengrin and Zenno Rob Roy

In 2004, Tap Dance City won the Kinko Sho for a second time before starting 5/2 favourite for the Takarazuka Kinen at Hanshin Racecourse on June 27. Sato tracked the leaders before sending the seven-year-old into the lead half a mile from the finish. Tap Dance City won by two lengths and three quarters of a length from Silk Famous and Lincoln, with Zenno Rob Roy taking fourth ahead of That's The Plenty. In autumn, Tap Dance City was sent to Europe to contest the Prix de l'Arc de Triomphe at Longchamp Racecourse on October 3. While planned to arrive in France a week before the race, Tap Dance City's plane broke down, forcing a land trip to Kanto where he could be loaded onto a standard cargo plane, arriving three days before the l'Arc and allowing for only one day of training. In the race, he disputed the lead until the turn into the straight, but faded in the closing stages and finished seventeenth of the nineteen runners behind Bago. Tap Dance City returned to Japan, and in December he finished second in the Arima Kinen, beaten half a length by Zenno Rob Roy, with Delta Blues, Hishi Miracle and Heart's Cry among the unplaced finishers.

As an eight-year-old, Tap Dance City won the Kinko Sho for a third time but finished unplaced in his remaining four races.

== Stud record ==
Tap Dance City was retired from racing to become a breeding stallion at the Breeders' Stallion Station. To date he had made no impact as a sire of winners. He was "put out of stud" in Japan on May 12, 2011.

== In popular culture ==
An anthropomorphized version of Tap Dance City appears as a character in the Japanese multimedia franchise Umamusume: Pretty Derby, voiced by Minami Shinoda. She is depicted as an energetic, brash, and boisterous North American transfer student who dreams of attaining a "romantic" lifestyle through a wealthy and prestigious racing career. She developed an admiration for Katsuragi Ace after witnessing her win the Japan Cup, which led to her decision to immigrate to Japan, and references her real-life jockey, Tetsuzo Sato's, inspiration for becoming a jockey in the same way during his childhood. She is good friends and roommates with Daitaku Helios, and their shared enjoyment for parties and loud music often irritates their neighbors.

== Racing form ==
Tap Dance City won 12 races and placed in another 13 out of 42 starts. This data is available in JBIS, netkeiba and racingpost.

Date	Track	Race	Grade	Distance (Condition)	Entry	HN	Odds (Favored)	Finish	Time	Margins	Jockey	Winner (Runner-up)
2000 – three-year-old season
Mar 4	Hanshin	3yo Newcomer		2,000 m (Good)	13	11	11.8 (6)	9th	2:10.5	2.2	Hirofumi Shii	Mirada
Mar 19	Hanshin	3yo Newcomer		2,200 m (Firm)	9	7	15.6 (4)	1st	2:18.4	0.0	Hirofumi Shii	(Kagami Paradise)
Apr 15	Hanshin	Wakakusa Stakes	OP	2,200 m (Firm)	12	11	19.2 (7)	5th	2:18.7	0.3	Hirofumi Shii	Agnes Flight
May 6	Kyoto	Kyoto Shimbun Hai	3	2,000 m (Firm)	14	5	13.7 (5)	3rd	2:00.3	0.5	Hirofumi Shii	Agnes Flight
Jun 4	Chukyo	Shirayuri Stakes		1,800 m (Firm)	13	9	4.0 (2)	7th	1:49.2	0.9	Shigefumi Kumazawa	Jin Warabeuta
Jun 18	Hanshin	Noichigo Sho	ALW (1W)	2,200 m (Firm)	13	7	4.5 (2)	5th	2:17.2	0.2	Shigefumi Kumazawa	White Happiness
Oct 29	Kyoto	3yo+ Allowance	1W	2,400 m (Soft)	14	5	8.6 (5)	4th	2:27.3	0.4	Hirofumi Shii	Heartland Hiryu
Nov 18	Kyoto	Yase Tokubetsu		2,400 m (Firm)	8	7	6.9 (4)	2nd	2:28.4	0.2	Hideaki Miyuki	White Happiness
Dec 9	Chukyo	Tenryugawa Tokubetsu		2,500 m (Firm)	10	10	3.0 (2)	1st	R2:31.4	–0.3	Daisaku Matsuda	(Bohemian Cherry)
2001 – four-year-old season
Jan 8	Kyoto	Manyo Stakes	OP	3,000 m (Good)	10	2	5.2 (3)	5th	3:09.3	0.6	Hirofumi Shii	Toshi the V.
Feb 18	Kokura	Kammonkyo Stakes	ALW (3W)	2,000 m (Firm)	12	10	4.1 (2)	3rd	2:02.8	0.2	Eiji Nakadate	Fight Commander
Mar 25	Hanshin	Tajima Stakes	ALW (3W)	2,000 m (Firm)	11	7	4.6 (3)	2nd	2:00.0	0.4	Katsumi Ando	Fight Commander
Apr 7	Hanshin	Osaka-Hamburg Cup	OP	2,500 m (Firm)	11	9	4.7 (2)	5th	2:33.8	0.5	Hirofumi Shii	Mejiro Sandra
Dec 8	Hanshin	3yo+ Allowance	2W	2,000 m (Firm)	9	5	9.7 (4)	4th	2:01.3	0.6	Hirofumi Shii	Daitaku Bertram
Dec 23	Hanshin	Esaka Tokubetsu	ALW (2W)	2,500 m (Firm)	16	7	5.1 (3)	2nd	2:33.5	0.2	Hirofumi Shii	Sharp Kick
2002 – five-year-old season
Jan 13	Kyoto	Nikkei Shinshun Hai	2	2,400 m (Firm)	12	3	16.1 (6)	3rd	2:26.6	0.2	Shoichi Kawahara	Top Commander
Feb 9	Kyoto	Kasuga Tokubetsu	ALW (2W)	1,800 m (Firm)	12	1	1.9 (1)	1st	1:46.9	–0.2	Yutaka Take	(Asuka Tsuyoshi)
Mar 2	Hanshin	Midosuji Stakes	ALW (3W)	2,200 m (Firm)	11	4	1.8 (1)	1st	2:12.3	–0.6	Olivier Peslier	(Active Bio)
Mar 23	Nakayama	Nikkei Sho	2	2,500 m (Firm)	8	5	9.6 (3)	2nd	2:37.0	0.0	Masaki Katsuura	Active Bio
Apr 21	Tokyo	Metropolitan Stakes	OP	2,300 m (Good)	11	11	3.7 (1)	3rd	2:21.2	0.5	Masaki Katsuura	Tsurumaru Boy
May 18	Tokyo	Meguro Kinen	2	2,500 m (Soft)	18	1	18.4 (8)	5th	2:32.4	0.6	Masaki Katsuura	Toshi the V.
Jul 21	Hakodate	Hakodate Kinen	3	2,000 m (Firm)	16	10	11.9 (7)	8th	2:06.2	1.1	Hirofumi Shii	Yamanin Respect
Sep 7	Hanshin	Asahi Challenge Cup	3	2,000 m (Firm)	10	2	9.6 (5)	1st	R1:58.1	0.0	Tetsuzo Sato	(Ibuki Government)
Oct 6	Kyoto	Kyoto Daishoten	2	2,400 m (Firm)	8	5	8.9 (3)	3rd	2:24.0	0.4	Tetsuzo Sato	Narita Top Road
Nov 3	Nakayama	Copa Republica Argentina	2	2,500 m (Firm)	11	5	3.5 (2)	3rd	2:31.4	0.8	Tetsuzo Sato	Sunrise Jaeger
Nov 23	Kyoto	Keihan Hai	3	1,800 m (Firm)	15	14	13.6 (6)	5th	1:45.7	0.4	Tetsuzo Sato	Sidewinder
Dec 22	Nakayama	Arima Kinen	1	2,500 m (Good)	14	8	86.3 (13)	2nd	2:32.7	0.1	Tetsuzo Sato	Symboli Kris S
2003 – six-year-old season
Apr 26	Tokyo	Commemoration of Renewal of the Tokyo Racecourse	OP	2,400 m (Firm)	13	10	11.3 (7)	1st	2:23.7	–0.3	Tetsuzo Sato	(Lady Pastel)
May 31	Chukyo	Kinko Sho	2	2,000 m (Good)	14	11	5.8 (4)	1st	1:58.9	–0.1	Tetsuzo Sato	(Tsurumaru Boy)
Jun 29	Hanshin	Takarazuka Kinen	1	2,200 m (Firm)	17	16	9.3 (4)	3rd	2:12.2	0.2	Tetsuzo Sato	Hishi Miracle
Oct 12	Kyoto	Kyoto Daishoten	2	2,400 m (Firm)	9	10	2.2 (1)	1st	2:26.6	–0.2	Tetsuzo Sato	(Hishi Miracle)
Nov 30	Tokyo	Japan Cup	1	2,400 m (Soft)	18	1	13.8 (4)	1st	2:28.7	–1.5	Tetsuzo Sato	(That's the Plenty)
Dec 28	Nakayama	Arima Kinen	1	2,500 m (Firm)	12	6	3.9 (2)	8th	2:32.8	–2.3	Tetsuzo Sato	Symboli Kris S
2004 – seven-year-old season
May 29	Chukyo	Kinko Sho	2	2,000 m (Firm)	12	11	2.3 (1)	1st	R1:57.5	0.0	Tetsuzo Sato	(Blue Eleven)
Jun 27	Hanshin	Takarazuka Kinen	1	2,200 m (Firm)	15	15	3.5 (1)	1st	2:11.1	–0.3	Tetsuzo Sato	(Silk Famous)
Oct 3	Longchamp	Prix de l'Arc de Triomphe	1	2,400 m (Good)	19	6	10/1 (6)	17th	2:27.8	2.8	Tetsuzo Sato	Bago
Dec 26	Nakayama	Arima Kinen	1	2,500 m (Firm)	15	9	8.8 (3)	2nd	2:29.6	0.1	Tetsuzo Sato	Zenno Rob Roy
2005 – eight-year-old season
May 28	Chukyo	Kinko Sho	2	2,000 m (Firm)	10	10	1.4 (1)	1st	1:58.9	–0.4	Tetsuzo Sato	(Vita Rosa)
Jun 26	Hanshin	Takarazuka Kinen	1	2,200 m (Firm)	15	15	1.9 (1)	7th	2:12.7	1.2	Tetsuzo Sato	Sweep Tosho
Oct 30	Tokyo	Tenno Sho (Autumn)	1	2,000 m (Firm)	18	6	14.1 (6)	9th	2:00.6	0.5	Tetsuzo Sato	Heavenly Romance
Nov 27	Tokyo	Japan Cup	1	2,400 m (Firm)	18	2	17.2 (7)	10th	2:23.1	1.0	Tetsuzo Sato	Alkaased
Dec 25	Nakayama	Arima Kinen	1	2,500 m (Firm)	16	9	19.7 (5)	12th	2:33.3	1.4	Tetsuzo Sato	Heart's Cry

Legend:
Turf

- R indicated that it was a record time finish

== Pedigree ==
Pedigree of Tap Dance City (USA), bay stallion, 1997
Sire Pleasant Tap (USA) 1987	Pleasant Colony; 1978	His Majesty	Ribot
Sire Pleasant Tap (USA) 1987	Pleasant Colony; 1978	His Majesty	Flower Bowl
Sire Pleasant Tap (USA) 1987	Pleasant Colony; 1978	Sun Colony	Sunrise Flight
Sire Pleasant Tap (USA) 1987	Pleasant Colony; 1978	Sun Colony	Colonia
Sire Pleasant Tap (USA) 1987	Never Knock; 1979	Stage Door Johnny	Prince John
Sire Pleasant Tap (USA) 1987	Never Knock; 1979	Stage Door Johnny	Peroxide Blonde
Sire Pleasant Tap (USA) 1987	Never Knock; 1979	Never Hula	Never Bend
Sire Pleasant Tap (USA) 1987	Never Knock; 1979	Never Hula	Hula Hula
Dam All Dance (USA) 1978	Northern Dancer; 1961	Nearctic	Nearco
Dam All Dance (USA) 1978	Northern Dancer; 1961	Nearctic	Lady Angela
Dam All Dance (USA) 1978	Northern Dancer; 1961	Natalma	Native Dancer
Dam All Dance (USA) 1978	Northern Dancer; 1961	Natalma	Almahmoud
Dam All Dance (USA) 1978	All Rainbows; 1973	Bold Hour	Bold Ruler
Dam All Dance (USA) 1978	All Rainbows; 1973	Bold Hour	Seven Thirty
Dam All Dance (USA) 1978	All Rainbows; 1973	Miss Carmie	T. V. Lark
Dam All Dance (USA) 1978	All Rainbows; 1973	Miss Carmie	Twice Over (Family: 23-b)
