= Dance in the Dark (horse) =

Japanese Thoroughbred racehorse

Dance in the Dark ダンスインザダーク
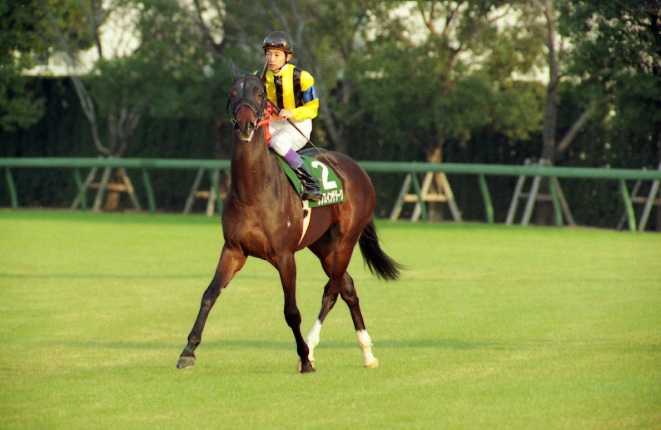
- Dance in the Dark with Yutaka Take (1995)
- Sire: Sunday Silence
- Grandsire: Halo
- Dam: Dancing Key
- Damsire: Nijinsky II
- Sex: Stallion
- Foaled: June 5, 1993
- Died: January 2, 2020 (aged 26)
- Country: Japan
- Colour: Bay
- Breeder: Shadai Farm
- Owner: Shadai Race Horse Co. Ltd.
- Racing colours
- Trainer: Kojiro Hashiguchi
- Jockey: Yutaka Take
- Record: 8: 5-2-1
- Earnings: 379,551,000 yen

Major wins
- Yayoi Sho (1996); Kyoto Shimbun Hai (1996); Japanese Classic Race wins: Kikuka-shō (1996)

Awards
- JRA Award for Best Three-Year-Old Colt (1996)
- Last updated on August 6, 2019

Dance in the Dark (Japanese: ダンスインザダーク, Hepburn: Dansu in za Dāku; June 5, 1993 – January 2, 2020) was a Japanese Thoroughbred racehorse and sire. He won the Kikuka-shō and was named the Best Three-Year-Old Colt in 1996. He was a full sibling to Dance Partner and Dance in the Mood.

== Career ==
Racing as a three-year-old, he defeated Fusaichi Concorde (winner of the Japanese Derby) at Kikuka-shō (JPN Domestic GI, Japanese St. Leger), and was second in the Tokyo Yushun (JPN Domestic GI, Japanese Derby). After winning the Kikuka-shō, however, he was diagnosed with tendonitis and, as a result, was retired to stand stud.

== Racing form ==
Dance in the Dark finished on the podium in his whole career (five wins, two second-place finishes, and three third-place finishes out of eight starts). The available data is based on JBIS and netkeiba.

Date	Track	Race	Grade	Distance (Condition)	Entry	HN	Odds (Favored)	Finish	Time	Margins	Jockey	Winner (Runner-up)
1995 – two-year-old season
Dec 3	Hanshin	2yo Newcomer		1,600 m (Firm)	11	2	2.4 (1)	1st	1:35.3	–0.1	Yutaka Take	(Matikanehiganoboru)
Dec 23	Hanshin	Radio Tampa Hai Sansai Stakes	3	2,000 m (Firm)	15	2	4.0 (2)	3rd	2:03.3	0.6	Yutaka Take	Royal Touch
1996 – three-year-old season
Feb 4	Kyoto	Kisaragi Sho	3	1,800 m (Firm)	10	3	3.2 (2)	2nd	1:48.2	0.0	Yutaka Take	Royal Touch
Mar 3	Nakayama	Yayoi Sho	2	2,000 m (Firm)	13	5	2.1 (2)	1st	2:02.7	–0.2	Yutaka Take	(Tsukuba Symphony)
May 11	Tokyo	Principal Stakes	OP	2,200 m (Firm)	13	2	1.1 (2)	1st	2:13.9	–0.3	Yutaka Take	(Topical Collector)
Jun 2	Tokyo	Tokyo Yushun	1	2,400 m (Firm)	17	3	2.3 (1)	2nd	2:26.1	0.0	Yutaka Take	Fusaichi Concorde
Oct 13	Kyoto	Kyoto Shimbun Hai	2	2,200 m (Firm)	11	9	1.9 (1)	1st	2:14.1	–0.1	Yutaka Take	(Kashima Dream)
Nov 3	Kyoto	Kikuka-shō	1	3,000 m (Firm)	17	17	2.6 (1)	1st	3:05.1	–0.1	Yutaka Take	(Royal Touch)

Legend:
Turf

== Stud career ==
Dance in the Dark's descendants include:

c = colt, f = filly
bold = grade 1 stakes

Grade One winners
Foaled	Name	Sex	Major Wins
1998	Tsurumaru Boy	c	Chukyo Kinen, Kinko Sho, **Yasuda Kinen**
2000	That's the Plenty	c	Radio Tampa Hai Nisai Stakes, **Kikuka-shō**
2001	Delta Blues	c	**Kikuka-shō**, Stayers Stakes, **Melbourne Cup**
2006	Three Rolls	c	**Kikuka-shō**

Other winners
Foaled	Name	Sex	Major Wins
1998	Daitaku Bertram	c	Hanshin Daishōten, Kitakyushu Kinen, Stayers Stakes
1998	Oiwake Hikari	f	Flora Stakes
1999	Azuma Beyond	c	Hanshin Jump Stakes
1999	Fast Tateyama	c	Daily Hai Nisai Stakes, Kyoto Shimbun Hai
1999	Inter Taiyo	c	Hyogo Championship
1999	Tagano My Bach	c	Chukyo Kinen, Sankei Ōsaka Hai
2000	Macky Max	c	Diamond Stakes
2000	Marubutsu Top	c	Saga Kinen
2000	Win Glanz	c	Diamond Stakes
2001	Dance A Joy	c	Kokura Kinen
2001	Jolly Dance	f	Hanshin Himba Stakes (twice)
2002	Chosan	c	Mainichi Ōkan
2002	Conrad	c	Radio Tampa Sho
2002	Dance in the More	c	Spring Stakes, Fukushima Kinen
2003	Toho Alan	c	Kyoto Shimbun Hai, Chunichi Shimbun Hai, Kyōto Daishōten
2004	Maruka Phoenix	c	Hanshin Cup, Swan Stakes
2004	Zarema	f	Keisei Hai Autumn Handicap
2005	Mood Indigo	f	Fuchu Himba Stakes
2006	Danon Yoyo	c	Fuji Stakes
2006	Forgettable	c	Stayers Stakes, Diamond Stakes
2006	Strong Garuda	c	Radio Nikkei Sho
2006	Touch Me Not	c	Nakayama Kimpai
2006	Viva Vodka	f	Flower Cup
2007	Dark Shadow	c	Epsom Cup, Mainichi Ōkan
2009	Clarente	c	Daily Hai Nisai Stakes, Fuji Stakes, Tokyo Shimbun Hai, Epsom Cup, Sekiya Kinen, Keisei Hai Autumn Handicap

== Pedigree ==
Pedigree of Dance in the Dark
Sire Sunday Silence	Halo	Hail to Reason	Turn-To
Sire Sunday Silence	Halo	Hail to Reason	Nothirdchance
Sire Sunday Silence	Halo	Cosmah	Cosmic Bomb
Sire Sunday Silence	Halo	Cosmah	Almahmoud
Sire Sunday Silence	Wishing Well	Understanding	Promised Land
Sire Sunday Silence	Wishing Well	Understanding	Pretty Ways
Sire Sunday Silence	Wishing Well	Mountain Flower	Montparnasse
Sire Sunday Silence	Wishing Well	Mountain Flower	Edel Weiss
Dam Dancing Key	Nijinsky	Northern Dancer	Nearctic
Dam Dancing Key	Nijinsky	Northern Dancer	Natalma
Dam Dancing Key	Nijinsky	Flaming Page	Bull Page
Dam Dancing Key	Nijinsky	Flaming Page	Flaring Top
Dam Dancing Key	Key Partner	Key to the Mint	Graustark
Dam Dancing Key	Key Partner	Key to the Mint	Key Bridge
Dam Dancing Key	Key Partner	Native Partner	Raise a Native
Dam Dancing Key	Key Partner	Native Partner	Dinner Partner
