= Sonic Lady =

American-bred Thoroughbred racehorse

- Sire: Nureyev
- Grandsire: Northern Dancer
- Dam: Stumped
- Damsire: Owen Anthony
- Sex: Mare
- Foaled: 15 February 1983
- Died: February 1996 (Aged 12-13)
- Country: United States
- Colour: Bay
- Breeder: J. Allan McTier
- Owner: Sheikh Mohammed
- Trainer: Michael Stoute
- Record: 13:8-0-4

Major wins
- Blue Seal Stakes (1985); Nell Gwyn Stakes (1986); Irish 1,000 Guineas (1986); Coronation Stakes (1986); Child Stakes (1986, 1987); Sussex Stakes (1986); Prix du Moulin (1986)

Awards
- Top-rated European three-year-old filly (1986); Timeform top-rated three-year-old filly (1986); Timeform rating: 109p in 1985, 129 in 1986, 125 in 1987

Sonic Lady (15 February 1983 – February 1996) was an American-bred, British-trained racehorse and broodmare. A temperamental filly who was often difficult to ride, she was a specialist miler who won seven Group races. After winning her only race as a two-year-old, she won the Nell Gwyn Stakes in April 1986, but was beaten into third place when favourite for the 1000 Guineas. She then won her next five races: the Irish 1,000 Guineas, Coronation Stakes, Child Stakes, Sussex Stakes and Prix du Moulin and was rated the best filly of her generation in Europe. She stayed in training as a four-year-old in 1987 and won a second Child Stakes. She was twice the beaten favourite in the Breeders' Cup Mile. Retired to stud at the end of 1987, she had some success as a broodmare.

== Background ==
Sonic Lady was a bay mare with a small white star. bred in Kentucky by J. Allan McTier. She was sired by the disqualified 2000 Guineas winner Nureyev out of the Child Stakes winner Stumped. Apart from Sonic Lady, Nureyev was the sire of the winners of at least forty-five Group One/Grade I including Peintre Celebre, Spinning World, Zilzal, Stravinsky and Miesque. His career as a stallion has been described as "outstanding".

Sonic Lady was not, technically a Thoroughbred as her female ancestry could not be traced to one of the foundation mares of the breed. She was a product of the half-bred Verdict family, whose ancestry could be traced no further back than an unnamed Perion mare foaled in 1837. So many non-thoroughbreds from this family won major races that the descendants of the Perion mare were admitted to the General Stud Book in 1969 as Half-Bred Family 3. Members of this family include Quashed, Attraction and Sonic Lady's great-grandmother Lucasland, the winner of the July Cup in 1966

As a yearling, Sonic Lady was consigned to the Fasig-Tipton Sales, where she was bought for $500,000 by Sheikh Mohammed. The filly was sent to England where she was trained by Michael Stoute at Newmarket, Suffolk.

== Racing career ==
=== 1985: two-year-old season ===
Before Sonic Lady appeared on the racecourse she had acquired a reputation as the best filly in Stoute's stable and had been supported in the betting for the 1000 Guineas. She made her debut in the Blue Seal Stakes over six furlongs at Ascot Racecourse in September. Sonic Lady accelerated clear of her eight opponents in the final quarter mile and won by seven lengths from Warm Welcome despite drifting to the right in the closing stages. Despite never having contested a Group race she ended the year as the 3/1 favourite for the 1000 Guineas.

=== 1986: three-year-old season ===
==== Spring ====
Sonic Lady made her three-year-old debut in the Group Three Nell Gwyn Stakes over seven furlongs at Newmarket Racecourse on 15 April. She was traveling easily throughout the race and pulled clear of the field in the closing stages to win by three lengths from Lady Sophie, with the Cheveley Park Stakes winner Embla in fourth place. Her reappearance was the front-page story on the first edition of the newly founded Racing Post: the rival Sporting Life's front page had featured Embla. On 1 May Sonic Lady started the 6/4 favourite for the 173rd running of the 1000 Guineas over the Rowley Mile course at Newmarket. Swinburn opted to ride Sonic Lady in preference to her stable companion Maysoon who had won the Fred Darling Stakes at Newbury. She became unsettled in the preliminaries and arrived at the start in an agitated state. She took the lead approaching the final quarter mile but was overtaken in the closing stages and finished third, beaten three quarters of a length and a head by Midway Lady and Maysoon.

For Sonic Lady's next race, the Irish 1000 Guineas at the Curragh on 24 May she was equipped with a new bridle incorporating a rubber noseband, which was designed to help her settle. Her participation in the race was in doubt as she arrived without her equine passport but she was allowed to run after a copy was faxed from Newmarket. She started 4/1 joint favourite with the Poule d'Essai des Pouliches winner Baiser Vole and won easily by two lengths.

==== Summer ====
At Royal Ascot in June Sonic Lady started the 8/15 favourite for the Coronation Stakes (then a Group Two race) and won impressively by two length from Embla and Someone Special. She then added a victory in the Child Stakes (now the Group One Falmouth Stakes) at Newmarket on 9 July, beating Dusty Dollar by one and a half lengths. Three weeks later at Goodwood Racecourse, Sonic Lady was matched against colts and older horses for the first time in the Group One Sussex Stakes. The filly started the 5/6 favourite ahead of the Queen Anne Stakes winner Pennine Walk and the Kentucky Derby runner-up Bold Arrangement. Swinburn restrained Sonic Lady at the back of the five runner field before making a forward move in the straight. She quickly took the lead and went clear before being eased down to win by one and a half lengths from her stable companion Scottish Reel.

==== Autumn ====
In September, Sonic Lady was sent to France to contest the Prix du Moulin over 1600 metres at Longchamp Racecourse. She started the 8/5 favourite with her main opposition expected to come from the German colt Lirung, who had won the Prix Jacques Le Marois at Deauville Racecourse in August. Sonic Lady refused to settle for Swinburn and pulled hard from the start. She was still fighting her jockey's attempts to restrain her when she turned into the straight on the wide outside. Sonic Lady moved easily into the lead 400 metres from the finish but had to be ridden out by Swinburn to win by a head from the French colt Thrill Show, with Lirung three lengths back in third place.

After an eight-week break, Sonic Lady was sent to the United States for the Breeders' Cup Mile at Santa Anita Park. Starting the 2.3/1 favourite she tracked the leaders before briefly taking the lead in the straight. She was soon overtaken and faded in the closing stages to finish seventh, three and a half lengths behind the winner Last Tycoon.

=== 1987: four-year-old season ===
Sonic Lady remained in training as a four-year-old with the Breeders' Cup as her main objective. Her training in the early part of the year was disrupted by a foot injury and she appeared to be less than fully fit when she made her seasonal debut in the Queen Anne Stakes at Royal Ascot where she finished third, beaten a length and a head by the colts Then Again and Water Cay. Three weeks later she was matched against the leading three-year-old filly Forest Flower in the Child Stakes at Newmarket. The early pace was very slow and Swinburn opted to send the filly into the lead after two furlongs. In the closing stages she held off the sustained challenge of the Aga Khan's filly Shaikiya to win by a head with Forest Flower ten and a half lengths back in fourth. Sonic Lady did not race again until 26 September, when she finished third behind Milligram and Miesque in the Queen Elizabeth II Stakes at Ascot. In November, the filly was sent to California for her second attempt at the Breeders Cup Mile, with the Panamanian jockey Laffit Pincay replacing Swinburn. Racing on medication, including Lasix and Bute, she started the 2.9/1 favourite, but had no answer to the finishing speed of Miesque and finished third of the fourteen runners.

== Assessment ==
In 1985, the Independent Timeform organisation gave Sonic Lady a rating of 109p, the "p" indicating that she was likely to improve. In the following year she was given a Timeform rating of 129, placing her alongside the Prix Vermeille winner Darara as the highest-rated three-year-old filly of the season. In the official International Classification she was given a rating of 127, a pound ahead of Darara and the Prix de Diane winner Lacovia, making her the top-rated European three-year-old filly. In the 1987 International Classification, Sonic Lady was rated on 123 level with Asteroid Field as the best older female racehorse in Europe in the 7 furlongs plus division: Timeform gave her a rating of 125.

== Stud record ==
Sonic Lady was retired from racing to become a broodmare for her owner's Darley Stud. She produced two Group race winners, both sired by Blushing Groom:

- Hazaam, bay colt, foaled 1989, won eight races including the Supreme Stakes
- Sharman, bay colt, 1990, won Prix de La Jonchere

Through her daughter Soninke, who was exported to Japan, she was also the great-grand-dam of Logi Universe, Deirdre and Northern River, and great-great-grand-dam Songline and Panja Tower. Sonic Lady died after a paddock accident in February 1996.

== Pedigree ==
Pedigree of Sonic Lady (USA), bay mare, 1983
Sire Nureyev (USA) 1977	Northern Dancer (CAN); 1961	Nearctic	Nearco
Sire Nureyev (USA) 1977	Northern Dancer (CAN); 1961	Nearctic	Lady Angela
Sire Nureyev (USA) 1977	Northern Dancer (CAN); 1961	Natalma	Native Dancer
Sire Nureyev (USA) 1977	Northern Dancer (CAN); 1961	Natalma	Almahmoud
Sire Nureyev (USA) 1977	Special (USA); 1969	Forli	Aristophanes
Sire Nureyev (USA) 1977	Special (USA); 1969	Forli	Trevisa
Sire Nureyev (USA) 1977	Special (USA); 1969	Thong	Nantallah
Sire Nureyev (USA) 1977	Special (USA); 1969	Thong	Rough Shod
Dam Stumped (GB) 1977	Owen Anthony (GB); 1964	Proud Chieftain	Persian Gulf
Dam Stumped (GB) 1977	Owen Anthony (GB); 1964	Proud Chieftain	Bride Elect
Dam Stumped (GB) 1977	Owen Anthony (GB); 1964	Oweninny	Arctic Star
Dam Stumped (GB) 1977	Owen Anthony (GB); 1964	Oweninny	Trial Story
Dam Stumped (GB) 1977	Luckhurst (GB); 1972	Busted	Crepello
Dam Stumped (GB) 1977	Luckhurst (GB); 1972	Busted	Sans Le Sou
Dam Stumped (GB) 1977	Luckhurst (GB); 1972	Lucasland	Lucero
Dam Stumped (GB) 1977	Luckhurst (GB); 1972	Lucasland	Lavant (Half-bred family: B3)
