= Victoire Pisa =

Japanese-bred Thoroughbred racehorse

Victoire Pisa ヴィクトワールピサ
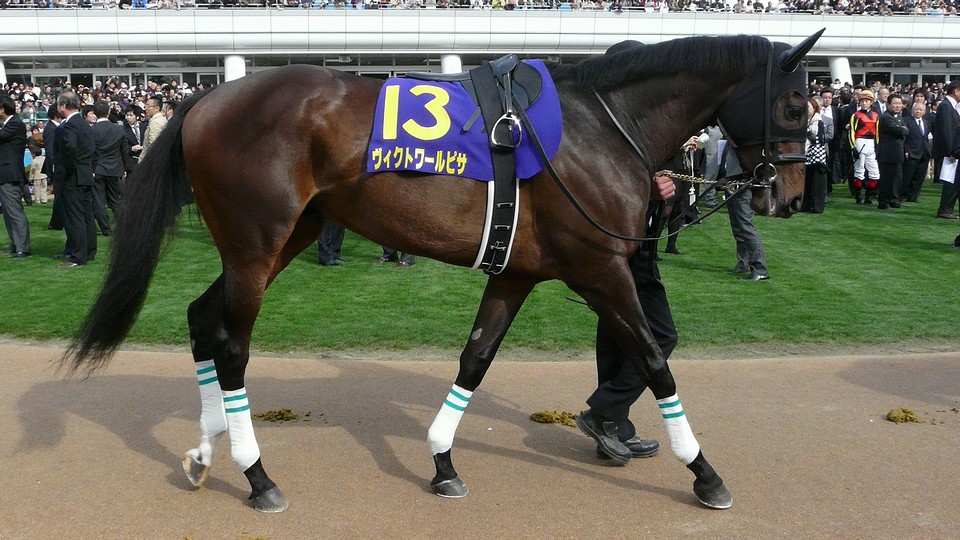
- Victoire Pisa at the paddock of the 2010 Satsuki Shō.
- Breed: Thoroughbred
- Sire: Neo Universe (JPN)
- Grandsire: Sunday Silence (USA)
- Dam: Whitewater Affair (GB)
- Damsire: Machiavellian (USA)
- Sex: Stallion
- Foaled: March 31, 2007 (age 19)
- Country: Japan
- Colour: Dark bay/Brown
- Breeder: Shadai Farm
- Owner: Yoshimi Ichikawa
- Racing colours
- Trainer: Katsuhiko Sumii
- Jockey: Mirco Demuro; Yasunari Iwata; Yutaka Take
- Record: 15: 8-1-2
- Earnings: ¥1,085,045,000; JRA: ¥595,954,000 ¥ Overseas: ¥489,086,500

Major wins
- Kyoto Nisai Stakes (2009); Radio Nikkei Hai Nisai Stakes (2009); Yayoi Sho (2010); Arima Kinen (2010); Nakayama Kinen (2011); Dubai World Cup (2011); Japanese Classic Race wins: Satsuki Shō (2010)

Awards
- JRA Award for Best Three-Year-Old Colt (2010); Japanese Champion Older Male Horse (2011)

Victoire Pisa (Japanese: ヴィクトワールピサ, Hepburn: Vikutowāru Pisa; foaled 31 March 2007) is a retired Japanese Thoroughbred racehorse and sire. After winning three of his four starts as a juvenile, he won the Satsuki Shō at Nakayama Racecourse in April 2010. After an unsuccessful campaign in Europe, he returned to Japan to win the weight-for-age invitational Arima Kinen in December. In the following spring, he was sent to Dubai where he raced for the first time on a synthetic track in the Dubai World Cup. He defeated an international field to become the first Japanese-trained horse to win the world's most valuable race. His subsequent career was restricted by injury problems, and he was retired at the end of 2011.

== Background ==
Victoire Pisa is a dark bay horse bred at the Shadai Farm in Hokkaido. His sire Neo Universe, a son of the thirteen-time leading sire in Japan Sunday Silence, was a successful Japanese performer, winning the Satsuki Shō and the Tokyo Yūshun, the first two legs of the Japanese Triple Crown in 2003. At stud he has sired the Satsuki Shō winner Unrivaled and the Tokyo Yūshun winner Logi Universe. Victoire Pisa's dam Whitewater Affair was a successful British racehorse who won the John Porter Stakes and the Prix de Pomone as a four-year-old in 1997. At stud in Britain she bred the Yasuda Kinen winner Asakusa Denen, and was then exported to Japan where her other foals included the Group Three winner Swift Current. The colt was prepared for racing by Katsuhiko Sumii, the trainer of Delta Blues and Vodka.

== Racing career ==
=== 2009: two-year-old season ===
Victoire Pisa opened his racing career with three races at Kyoto Racecourse in late 2009. On 25 October he ran in a nine furlong event for unraced horses in which he finished second to Rose Kingdom, a colt who went on to win the Japan Cup. Two weeks later he recorded his first win in a ten furlong maiden race. On 28 November Victoire Pisa started the 1/2 favourite for the Kyoto Nisai Stakes and won by one and a half lengths. On his final start of the year he was moved up in class for the domestic Group Three Radio Nikkei Hai Nisai Stakes at Hanshin Racecourse on 26 December. Starting the 3/5 favourite he took the lead near the finish and won by a neck from Cosmo Phantom.

=== 2010: three-year-old season ===
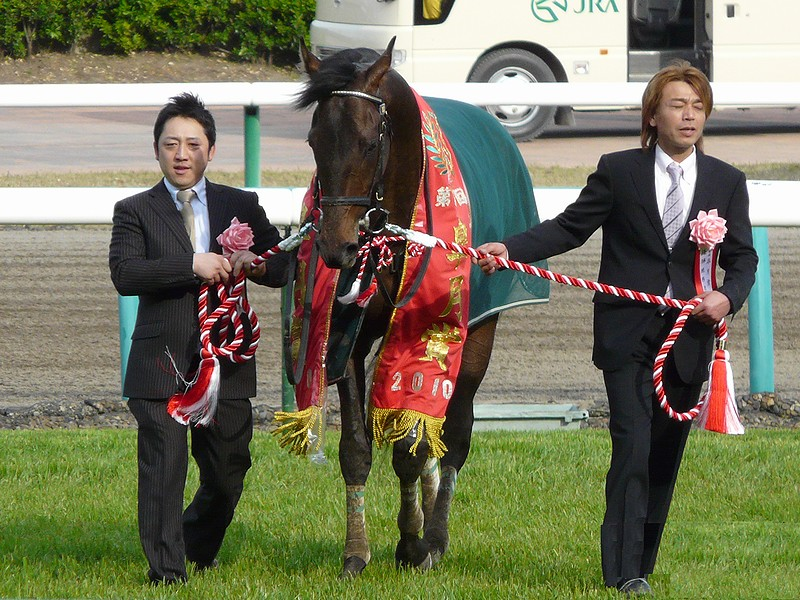
Victoire Pisa after winning the Satsuki Shō

Victoire Pisa began his three-year-old season in March at Nakayama Racecourse in the Hochi Hai Yayoi Shō, a trial race for the Satsuki Shō. Despite having to be switched to obtain a clear run he took the lead 50 yards from the line and won by half a length from Eishin Apollon. In the Satsuki Shō a month later he started the 1.3/1 favourite in a field of eighteen three-year-old colts. Ridden by Yasunari Iwata he again struggled to get a clear run in the straight before accelerating through a gap along the rail to take the lead inside the final furlong and win from Hiruno d'Amour, Eishin Flash and Rose Kingdom. On 30 May Victoire Pisa started 11/10 favourite for the Tokyo Yushun over one and a half miles at Tokyo Racecourse. Yet again, he had a troubled passage, and was in eighth place two furlongs from the finish. Despite making steady progress in the closing stages he finished third behind Eishin Flash and Rose Kingdom.

Victoire Pisa was then sent to Europe where he was trained with the Prix de l'Arc de Triomphe as his main objective. He finished fourth behind Behkabad in the Prix Niel at Longchamp Racecourse in September and then finished seventh of the nineteen runners behind Workforce in the Arc a month later. On his return from Europe, Victoire Pisa was made a 27/1 outsider for the Japan Cup at Tokyo on 28 November. In a controversial race the colt took the lead in the straight but was overtaken by Buena Vista inside the final furlong and lost second place on the line to Rose Kingdom. An inquiry by the racecourse stewards saw the winner disqualified for causing interference to the runner-up. Victoire Pisa was one of fifteen horses invited to contest the Arima Kinen on 26 December at Nakayama. Ridden for the first time by the Italian jockey Mirco Demuro he started at odds of 7.4/1 in a field which included Buena Vista, Eishin Flash, Dream Journey and Oken Bruce Lee. In front of a crowd of 120,813 Victoire Pisa was always among the leaders and moved up quickly to take the lead entering the straight. He held off the late challenge of the favourite Buena Vista to win by a nose. Demuro described the winner as "a fantastic horse" with a "great heart".

At the end of the season, Victoire Pisa was voted Japanese Champion Three-year-old colt.

=== 2011: four-year-old season ===
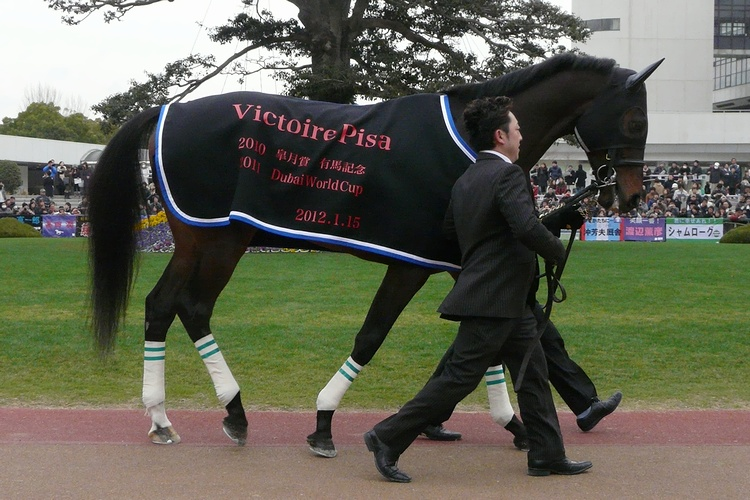
Victoire Pisa at his retirement ceremony in January 2012

On his first appearance as a four-year-old, Victoire Pisa started the 2/5 favourite for the Nakayama Kinen over nine furlongs on 27 February. He took the lead in the straight and won comfortably by two and a half lengths from Captain Thule. The colt was then sent to the United Arab Emirates to contest the Dubai World Cup at Meydan Racecourse on 26 March. The race was run over ten furlongs on a synthetic Tapeta footings surface and attracted runners from Britain, Ireland, South Africa, Saudi Arabia and the United States. Demuro restrained the colt in last place before moving up to join the leaders half a mile from the finish of a slowly run race. He took the lead in the straight and held off the challenge of his fellow Japanese challenger Transcend by half a length with Monterosso in third and Cape Blanco in fourth. Victoire Pisa became the first Japanese-trained horse to win the "world's richest race". The victory was an emotional one for the Japanese contingent, coming less than three weeks after the country had been struck by an earthquake and tsunami: Demuro returned to the winner's enclosure in tears, whilst Katsuhiko Sumii said that he felt that "the whole country was behind me." Victoire Pisa was sent to Europe again but did not contest any races after sustaining a series of leg injuries.

Victoire Pisa returned to Japan at the end of the year but was unable to reproduce his early season form. He finished thirteenth behind Buena Vista in the Japan Cup and eighth behind Orfevre in the Arima Kinen. He was retired from racing at the end of December. Sumii commented on the colt's retirement by saying that "I feel I should apologise to him because I couldn't get him back to his best but at least I am happy that I can send him to the stud without any further accidents". Victoire Pisa was named Japanese Champion Older Male for 2011.

== Stud record ==
Victoire Pisa was retired from racing to become a breeding stallion at the Shadai Stallion Station. He made an immediate impact by siring the Oka Sho winner Jeweler in his first crop of foals. Panja Tower won the NHK Mile Cup with Victoire Pisa as the broodmare sire.

In December 2017, Victoire Pisa was moved from Shadai Stallion Station to the Breeders Stallion Station, where he stood stud for three seasons before being sold to Turkey along with Kluger, another Japanese-bred stallion.

=== Notable stock ===
c = colt, f = filly, g = gelding

Foaled	Name	Sex	Major wins
2013	Jeweler	f	Oka Sho

== In popular culture ==
An anthropomorphized version of Victoire Pisa appears as a character in the Japanese multimedia franchise Umamusume: Pretty Derby, voiced by Hana Shimano. She is depicted as a kindhearted, altruistic girl with an virtuous, saintly air who, despite often encountering great struggles, goes to great lengths to help and inspire hope in others. Her angelic motifs, as well as her career mode in the video game, are inspired by the real horse's 2011 Dubai World Cup win and the victory's emotional impact in Japan following the Tōhoku earthquake.

== Racing form ==
The following racing form is based on information available on JBIS, Netkeiba and Racingpost.

Date	Track	Race	Grade	Distance (Condition)	Entry	HN	Odds	Finish	Time	Margins	Jockey	Winner (Runner-up)
2009 – two-year-old season
Oct 25	Kyoto	2YO Debut		1,800m (Firm)	11	11	1.8	2nd	1:49.0	0.1	Yutaka Take	Rose Kingdom
Nov 7	Kyoto	2YO Maiden		2,000m (Firm)	11	9	1.2	1st	2:01.8	–0.6	Yutaka Take	(Field Pegasus)
Nov 28	Kyoto	Kyoto Nisai Stakes	OP	2,000m (Firm)	5	4	1.5	1st	2:01.6	–0.2	Yutaka Take	(Meisho Hommaru)
Dec 26	Hanshin	Radio Nikkei Hai Nisai Stakes	3	2,000m (Firm)	15	3	1.6	1st	2:01.3	0.0	Yutaka Take	(Cosmo Phantom)
2010 – three-year-old season
Mar 7	Nakayama	Hochi Hai Yayoi Sho	2	2,000m (Soft)	13	1	1.7	1st	2:06.1	–0.1	Yutaka Take	(Eishin Apollon)
Apr 18	Nakayama	Satsuki Sho	1	2,000m (Good)	18	13	2.3	1st	2:00.8	–0.2	Yasunari Iwata	(Hiruno d'Amour)
May 30	Tokyo	Tokyo Yushun	1	2,400m (Firm)	17	7	2.1	3rd	2:27.2	0.3	Yasunari Iwata	Eishin Flash
Sep 12	Longchamp	Prix Niel	2	2,400m (Soft)	7	7	6/1	4th	2:32.0	2.2	Yutaka Take	Behkabad
Oct 3	Longchamp	Prix de l'Arc de Triomphe	1	2,400m (Soft)	20	19	40/1	7th	2:37.3	2.0	Yutaka Take	Workforce
Nov 28	Tokyo	Japan Cup	1	2,400m (Firm)	18	2	28.2	3rd	2:25.2	0.0	Mirco Demuro	Rose Kingdom
Dec 26	Nakayama	Arima Kinen	1	2,500m (Firm)	15	1	8.4	1st	2:32.6	0.0	Mirco Demuro	(Buena Vista)
2011 – four-year-old season
Feb 27	Nakayama	Nakayama Kinen	2	1,800m (Firm)	12	9	1.4	1st	1:46.0	–0.4	Mirco Demuro	(Captain Thule)
Mar 26	Meydan	Dubai World Cup	1	2,000m (Fast)	14	6	12/1	1st	2:05.9	0.1	Mirco Demuro	(Transcend)
Nov 27	Tokyo	Japan Cup	1	2,400m (Firm)	16	8	10.9	13th	2:25.8	1.6	Mirco Demuro	Buena Vista
Dec 25	Nakayama	Arima Kinen	1	2,500m (Firm)	13	2	10.2	8th	2:36.5	0.5	Mirco Demuro	Orfevre

Legend:
Turf Tapeta

== Pedigree ==
Pedigree of Victoire Pisa (JPN), dark bay horse, 2007
Sire Neo Universe (JPN) 2000	Sunday Silence (USA); 1986	Halo	Hail To Reason
Sire Neo Universe (JPN) 2000	Sunday Silence (USA); 1986	Halo	Cosmah
Sire Neo Universe (JPN) 2000	Sunday Silence (USA); 1986	Wishing Well	Understanding
Sire Neo Universe (JPN) 2000	Sunday Silence (USA); 1986	Wishing Well	Mountain Flower
Sire Neo Universe (JPN) 2000	Pointed Path (GB); 1984	Kris	Sharpen Up
Sire Neo Universe (JPN) 2000	Pointed Path (GB); 1984	Kris	Doubly Sure
Sire Neo Universe (JPN) 2000	Pointed Path (GB); 1984	Silken Way	Shantung
Sire Neo Universe (JPN) 2000	Pointed Path (GB); 1984	Silken Way	Boulevard
Dam Whitewater Affair (GB) 1993	Machiavellian (USA); 1987	Mr. Prospector	Raise a Native
Dam Whitewater Affair (GB) 1993	Machiavellian (USA); 1987	Mr. Prospector	Gold Digger
Dam Whitewater Affair (GB) 1993	Machiavellian (USA); 1987	Coup de Folie	Halo
Dam Whitewater Affair (GB) 1993	Machiavellian (USA); 1987	Coup de Folie	Raise the Standard
Dam Whitewater Affair (GB) 1993	Much Too Risky (GB); 1982	Bustino	Busted
Dam Whitewater Affair (GB) 1993	Much Too Risky (GB); 1982	Bustino	Ship Yard
Dam Whitewater Affair (GB) 1993	Much Too Risky (GB); 1982	Short Rations	Lorenzaccio
Dam Whitewater Affair (GB) 1993	Much Too Risky (GB); 1982	Short Rations	Short Commons (Family:8-d)

- Victoire Pisa is inbred 3x4 to Halo, meaning that this stallion appears in both the third and fourth generations of his pedigree.
