= JRA Award for Best Three-Year-Old Colt =

Japanese thoroughbred horse racing award

The JRA Award for Best Three-Year-Old Colt is a title awarded annually by the Japan Racing Association (JRA). Since 1987 the honor has been part of the JRA Awards.

== Winners ==
Year	Horse	Trainer	Owner
1987	Sakura Star O	Yuji Hirai	Sakura Commerce
1988	Oguri Cap	Tsutomu Setoguchi	Shunsuke Kondo
1989	Winner's Circle	Yasuhisa Matsuyama	Hiroshi Kuriyama
1990	Ines Fujin	Shuho Kato	Masaaki Kobayashi
1991	Tokai Teio	Shouichi Matsumoto	Masanori Uchimura
1992	Mihono Bourbon	Toyama Tameo	Mihono International
1993	Biwa Hayahide	Mitsumasa Hamada	Biwa Co., Ltd.
1994	Narita Brian	Masaaki Ookubo	Hidenori Yamaji
1995	Mayano Top Gun	Masahiro Sakaguchi	Yu Tadokoro
1996	Dance in the Dark	Kojiro Hashiguchi	Shadai Racing
1997	Sunny Brian	Senji Nakao	Moriyasu Miyazaki
1998	El Condor Pasa	Yoshitaka Ninomiya	Takashi Watanabe
1999	T M Opera O	Ichizo Iwamoto	Masatsugu Takezono
2000	Air Shakur	Hideyuki Mori	Lucky Field Co
2001	Jungle Pocket	Sakae Watanabe	Yomoji Saitō
2002	Symboli Kris S	Kazuo Fujisawa	Symboli Stud
2003	Neo Universe	Tsutomu Setoguchi	Shadai Racing
2004	King Kamehameha	Kunihide Matsuda	Makoto Kaneko
2005	Deep Impact	Yasuo Ikee	Makoto Kaneko
2006	Meisho Samson	Tsutomu Setoguchi	Yoshio Matsumoto
2007	Asakusa Kings	Ryuji Okubo	Kunio Tahara
2008	Deep Sky	Mitsugu Kon	Toshio Fukami
2009	Logi Universe	Kiyoshi Hagawara	Masaaki Kumeta
2010	Victoire Pisa	Katsuhiko Sumii	Yoshimi Ichikawa
2011	Orfevre	Yasutoshi Ikee	Sunday Racing
2012	Gold Ship	Naosuke Sugai	Eiichi Kobayashi
2013	Kizuna	Shozo Sasaki	Shinji Maeda
2014	Isla Bonita	Hironori Kurita	Shadai Racing
2015	Duramente	Noriyuki Hori	Sunday Racing Co Ltd
2016	Satono Diamond	Yasutoshi Ikee	Hajime Satomi
2017	Rey de Oro	Kazuo Fujisawa	U Carrot Farm
2018	Blast Onepiece	Masahiro Otake	Silk Racing Co Ltd
2019	Saturnalia	Katsuhiko Sumii	Carrot Farm
2020	Contrail	Yoshito Yahagi	Shinji Maeda
2021	Efforia	Yuichi Shikato	Carrot Farm Co. Ltd.
2022	Equinox	Tetsuya Kimura	Silk Racing Co
2023	Tastiera	Noriyuki Hori	U Carrot Farm
2024	Danon Decile	Shogo Yasuda	Danox Co. Ltd.
2025	Museum Mile	Daisuke Takayanagi	Sunday Racing Co Ltd
