= Yayoi Sho =

Grade 2 flat horse race in Japan

Yayoi Sho 弥生賞
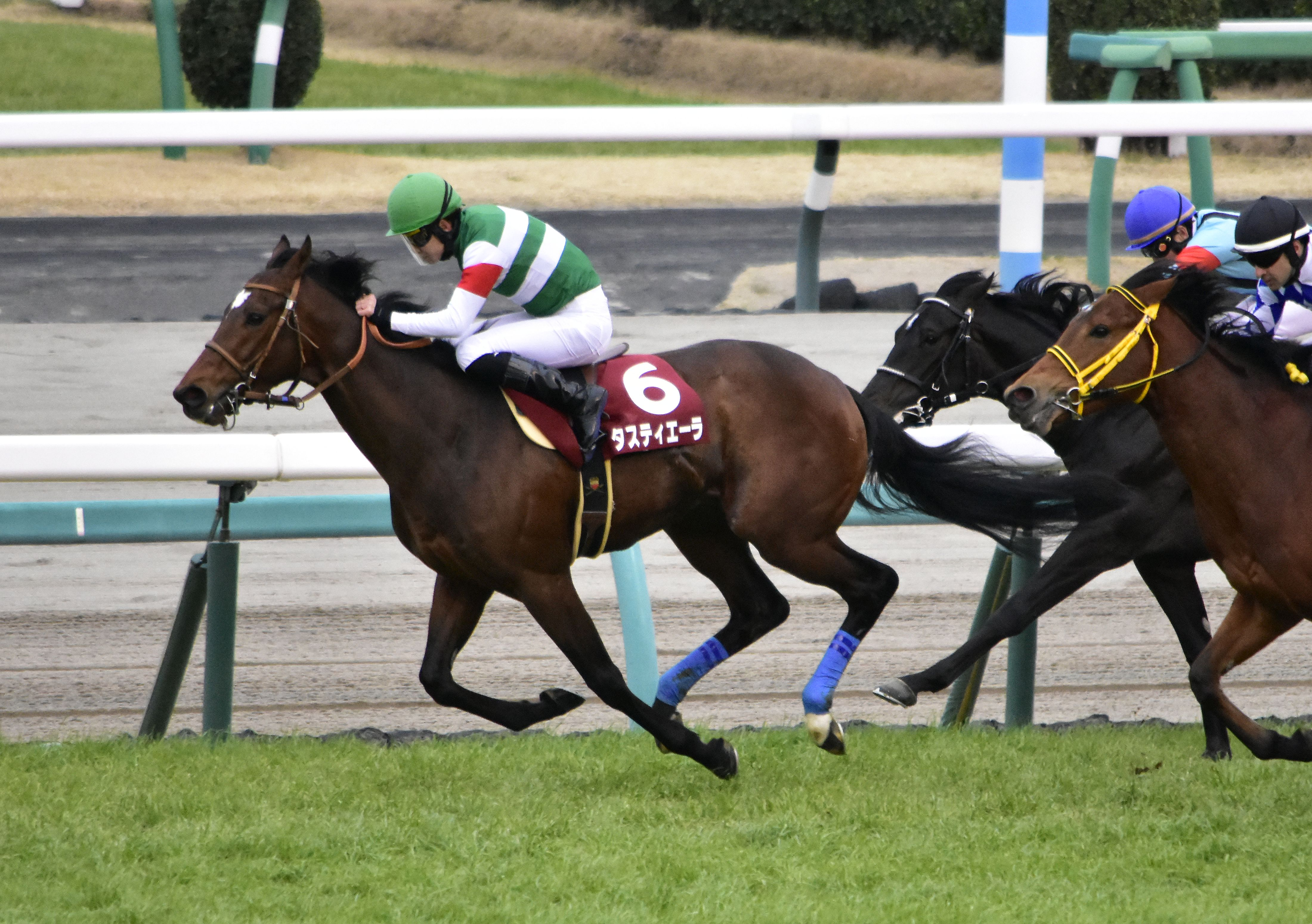
- 2023 Yayoi Sho winner Tastiera
- Class: Grade 2
- Location: Nakayama Racecourse, Funabashi, Chiba.
- Inaugurated: 1964
- Race type: Thoroughbred Flat racing

Race information
- Distance: 2000 metres
- Surface: Turf
- Track: Right-handed
- Qualification: 3-y-o
- Weight: 57 kg, Fillies allowed 2kg.
- Purse: ¥ 117,540,000 (as of 2025): 1st: ¥ 54,000,000; 2nd: ¥ 22,000,000; 3rd: ¥ 14,000,000

The Yayoi Sho (Deep Impact Kinen) (弥生賞ディープインパクト記念, Yayoi-shō (Deep Impact Kinen)) is a Grade 2 flat horse race in Japan for three-year-old Thoroughbred colts and fillies run over a distance of 2,000 metres at the Nakayama Racecourse, Funabashi, Chiba. The race is run in March and serves as a major trial race for the Satsuki Sho, which is run over the same distance in April. Yayoi means "March" in ancient Japanese calendar.

It was first run in 1964 as the Yayoi Sho (弥生賞, （Yayoi-shō）) . The race was run at Tokyo Racecourse in 1965, 1966, 1967, 1969, 1970 and 1988. Among the winners of the race have been Mr. C. B., Symboli Rudolf, Special Week, Agnes Tachyon, Deep Impact, Admire Moon and Victoire Pisa.

In October 2019, JRA decided to change the name to Yayoi Sho (Deep Impact Kinen) in memory of the late Deep Impact..

== Winners since 1995 ==
Year	Winner	Jockey	Trainer	Owner	Time
1995	Fuji Kiseki	Koichi Tsunoda	Sakae Watanabe	Yomoji Saito	2:03.7
1996	Dance in the Dark	Yutaka Take	Kojiro Hashiguchi	Shadai Race Horse	2:02.7
1997	Running Gale	Yutaka Take	Tadashi Kayo	Hidemasa Takahashi	2:02.2
1998	Special Week	Yutaka Take	Toshiaki Shirai	Hiroyoshi Usuda	2:01.8
1999	Narita Top Road	Kunihiko Watanabe	Yoshio Oki	Hidenori Yamaji	2:03.5
2000	Fusaichi Zenon	Shinji Fujita	Seiki Tabara	Fusao Sekiguchi	2:02.3
2001	Agnes Tachyon	Hiroshi Kawachi	Hiroyuki Nagahama	Takao Watanabe	2:05.7
2002	Balance of Game	Katsuharu Tanaka	Munakata Yoshitada	Hiroyuki Sonobe	2:02.0
2003	Eishin Champ	Yuichi Fukunaga	Tsutomu Setoguchi	Toyomitsu Hirai	2:02.3
2004	Cosmo Bulk	Fuyuki Igarashi	Kazunori Tabe	Misako Okada	2:00.5
2005	Deep Impact	Yutaka Take	Yasuo Ikee	Makoto Kaneko	2:02.2
2006	Admire Moon	Yutaka Take	Hiroyoshi Matsuda	Riichi Kondo	2:01.5
2007	Admire Aura	Yutaka Take	Hiroyoshi Matsuda	Riichi Kondo	2:00.5
2008	Meiner Charles	Masami Matsuoka	Ryuichi Inaba	Thoroughbred Club Ruffian	2:01.8
2009	Logi Universe	Norihiro Yokoyama	Kiyoshi Hagiwara	Masaaki Kumeda	2:03.5
2010	Victoire Pisa	Yutaka Take	Katsuhiko Sumii	Yoshimi Ichikawa	2:06.1
2011	Sadamu Patek	Yasunari Iwata	Masato Nishizono	Sada Onishi	2:01.0
2012	Cosmo Ozora	Daichi Shibata	Yoshihiro Takahashi	Big Red Farm	2:03.9
2013	Camino Tassajara	Hiroyuki Uchida	Sakae Kunieda	Kaneko Makoto Holdings	2:01.0
2014	To The World	Yuga Kawada	Yasutoshi Ikee	Carrot Farm	2:01.4
2015	Satono Crown	Yuichi Fukunaga	Noriyuki Hori	Hajime Satomi	2:01.8
2016	Makahiki	Christophe Lemaire	Yasuo Tomomichi	Kaneko Makoto Holdings	1:59.9
2017	Cadenas	Yuichi Fukunaga	Kazuya Nakatake	Koji Maeda	2:03.2
2018	Danon Premium	Yuga Kawada	Mitsumasa Nakauchida	Danox	2:01.0
2019	Meisho Tengen	Kenichi Ikezoe	Kaneo Ikezoe	Yoshio Matsumoto	2:03.3
2020	Satono Flag	Yutaka Take	Sakae Kunieda	Satomi Horse Company	2:02.9
2021	Titleholder	Takeshi Yokoyama	Toru Kurita	Hiroshi Yamada	2:02.0
2022	Ask Victor More	Hironobu Tanabe	Yasuhito Tamura	Hirosaki Toshihiro HD	2:00.5
2023	Tastiera	Kohei Matsuyama	Noriyuki Hori	Carrot Farm	2:00.4
2024	Cosmo Kuranda	Mirco Demuro	Shizuya Kato	Big Red Farm	1:59.8
2025	Faust Rasen	Makoto Sugihara	Masayuki Nishimura	Toshiya Miyazaki	2:01.3
2026	Basse Terre	Yuga Kawada	Takashi Saito	Silk Racing Co. Ltd.	2:00.2

== Earlier winners ==
- 1964 - Tokino Parade
- 1965 - Keystone
- 1966 - Tama Shuho
- 1967 - Asa Denko
- 1968 - Asaka O
- 1969 - Wild More
- 1970 - Tanino Moutiers
- 1971 - Mejiro Gekko
- 1972 - Long Ace
- 1973 - Haiseiko
- 1974 - Colonel Symboli
- 1975 - Kaburaya O
- 1976 - Climb Kaiser
- 1977 - Lucky Ruler
- 1978 - Fantast
- 1979 - Rikiai O
- 1980 - Tosho God
- 1981 - Todoroki Hiho
- 1982 - Saruno King
- 1983 - Mr. C. B.
- 1984 - Symboli Rudolf
- 1985 - Suda Hawk
- 1986 - Daishin Fubuki
- 1987 - Sakura Star O
- 1988 - Sakura Chiyono O
- 1989 - Rainbow Amber
- 1990 - Mejiro Ryan
- 1991 - Ibuki Maikagura
- 1992 - Asaka Regent
- 1993 - Winning Ticket
- 1994 - Sakura Eiko O

== See also ==
- Horse racing in Japan
- List of Japanese flat horse races
