= Kyoto Nisai Stakes =

Kyoto Nisai Stakes 京都2歳ステークス
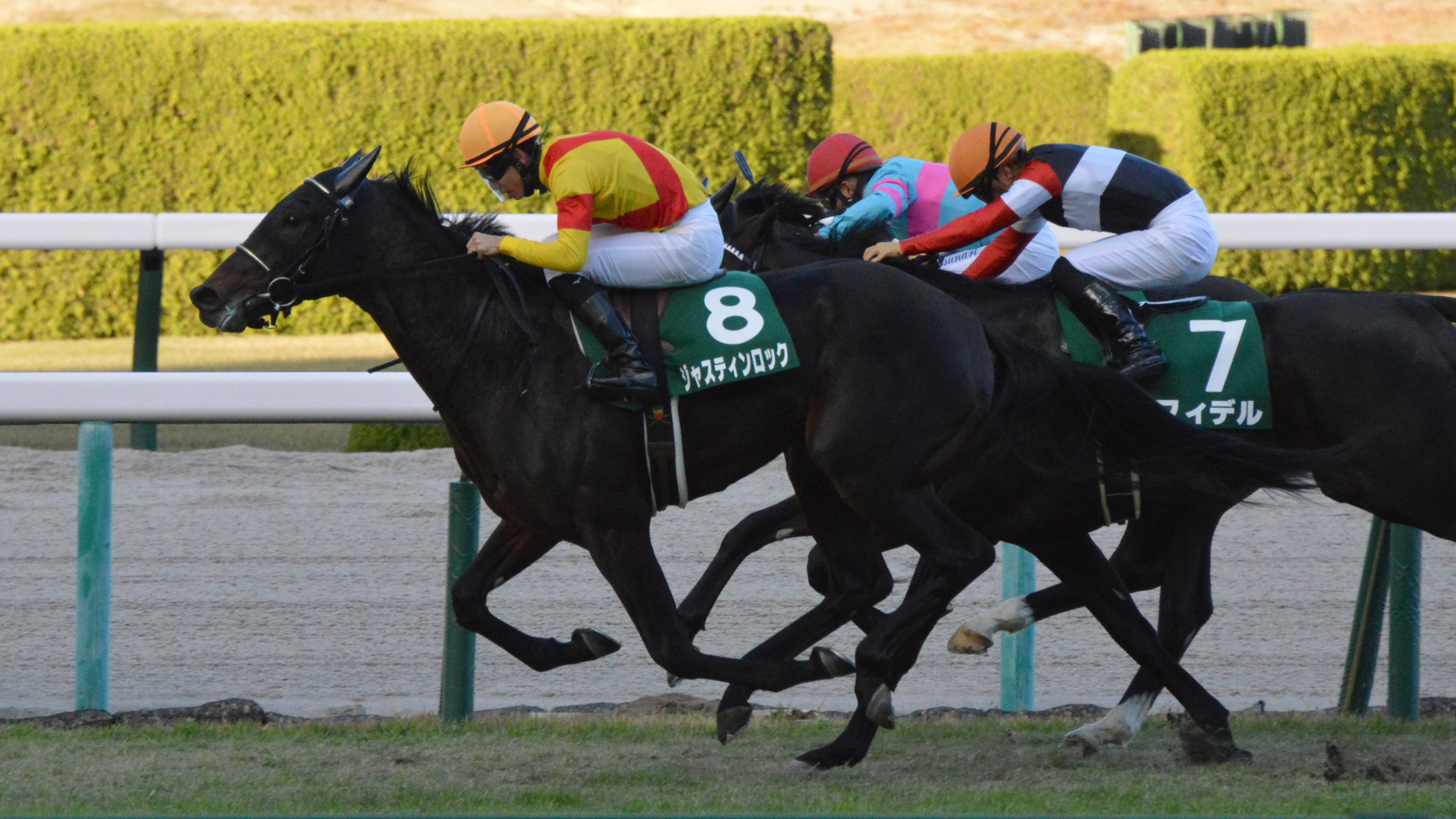
- 2021 Kyoto Nisai Stakes winner Justin Rock
- Class: Grade 3
- Location: Kyoto Racecourse
- Inaugurated: 1959
- Race type: Thoroughbred Flat racing

Race information
- Distance: 2000 metres
- Surface: Turf
- Track: Right-handed
- Qualification: 2-y-o
- Weight: 56 kg Allowance: Fillies 1 kg
- Purse: ¥ 70,880,000 (as of 2025): 1st: ¥ 33,000,000; 2nd: ¥ 13,000,000; 3rd: ¥ 8,000,000

The Kyoto Nisai Stakes (Japanese: 京都2歳ステークス) is a Japanese Grade 3 horse race for two-year-old Thoroughbreds run in November over a distance of 2000 metres at Kyoto Racecourse.

The race was first run in 1959 and was promoted to Grade 3 status in 2014. It was run over a variety of distances but has been contested over 2000 metres since 2002. Past winners have included Narita Brian, Victoire Pisa and Epiphaneia.

== Winners since 2014 ==
Year	Winner	Jockey	Trainer	Owner	Time
2014	Bell Lap	William Buick	Naosuke Sugai	Sunday Racing	2:04.8
2015	Dreadnoughtus	Yutaka Take	Yoshito Yahagi	Carrot Farm	2:01.3
2016	Cadenas	Yuichi Fukunaga	Kazuya Nakatake	Koji Maeda	2:02.6
2017	Grail	Yutaka Take	Kenji Nonaka	Kanayama Holdings	2:01.6
2018	Courageux Guerrier	João Moreira	Yasutoshi Ikee	Carrot Farm	2:01.5
2019	My Rapsody	Yutaka Take	Yasuo Tomomichi	Kieffers	2:01.5
2020	Wonderful Town ^{[a]}	Ryuji Wada	Yoshitada Takahashi	Masahiro Mita	2:01.6
2021	Justin Rock ^{[a]}	Kohei Matsuyama	Tatsuya Yoshioka	Masahiro Miki	2:03.3
2022	Gruner Green ^{[a]}	Mirco Demuro	Ikuo Aizawa	Mitsumasa Saito	2:00.5
2023	Shin Emperor	João Moreira	Yoshito Yahagi	Susumu Fujita	1:59.8
2024	Eri King	Yuga Kawada	Mitsumasa Nakauchida	Susumu Fujita	2:00.9
2025	Justin Vista	Yuichi Kitamura	Tatsuya Yoshioka	Masahiro Miki	2:00.4

^{a} The 2020, 2021, & 2022 races took place at Hanshin Racecourse.

== Earlier winners ==
- 1985 - Noto Perso
- 1986 - Yamanin Arden
- 1987 - Marushige Atlas
- 1988 - Shadai Kagura
- 1989 - Nichido Thunder
- 1990 - Soei Muteki
- 1991 - Stant Man
- 1992 - Marukatsu Oja; L-Way Win (tied)
- 1993 - Narita Brian
- 1994 - Ski Captain
- 1995 - Long Shikotei
- 1996 - Running Gale
- 1997 - Figaro
- 1998 - Osumi Bright
- 1999 - Yamanin Respect
- 2000 - Shower Party
- 2001 - Admire Don
- 2002 – Eishin Champ
- 2003 – Mystic Age
- 2004 – Rosenkreuz
- 2005 – Maruka Schenk
- 2006 – Gold Kirishima
- 2007 – Al Kazan
- 2008 – Executive
- 2009 – Victoire Pisa
- 2010 – Marvelous Kaiser
- 2011 – Trip
- 2012 – Epiphaneia
- 2013 – Tosen Stardom

== See also ==
- Horse racing in Japan
- List of Japanese flat horse races
