= Horse racing in Japan =

Sport in Japan

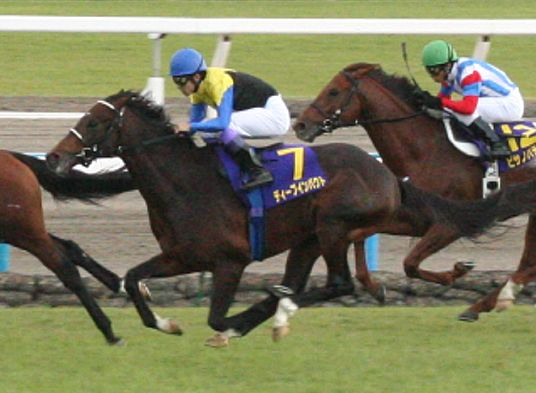
Deep Impact winning Kikuka Sho 2005 on 23 October.

Horse racing (競馬, keiba) is a popular equestrian sport in Japan, with more than 21,000 horse races held each year. Three types of racing take place in Japan - flat racing, jump racing, and Ban'ei Racing (also called draft racing).

In Japan, horse racing is organized jointly by the Japan Racing Association (JRA) and the National Association of Racing (NAR). The JRA is responsible for horseracing events at ten major racecourses in metropolitan areas, while the NAR is responsible for various local horseracing events throughout Japan. This system of administration of horse racing is unique to Japan.

Japan's top stakes races are run in the spring, autumn, and winter; the top race is the Japan Cup.

== History ==
The history of equestrian sports and horse racing in Japan goes back many centuries, but it was not until the Spring of 1862 that the first horse race in a recognizably European format was organized by a group of British residents on an area of drained marshland just outside the recently opened treaty port of Yokohama.

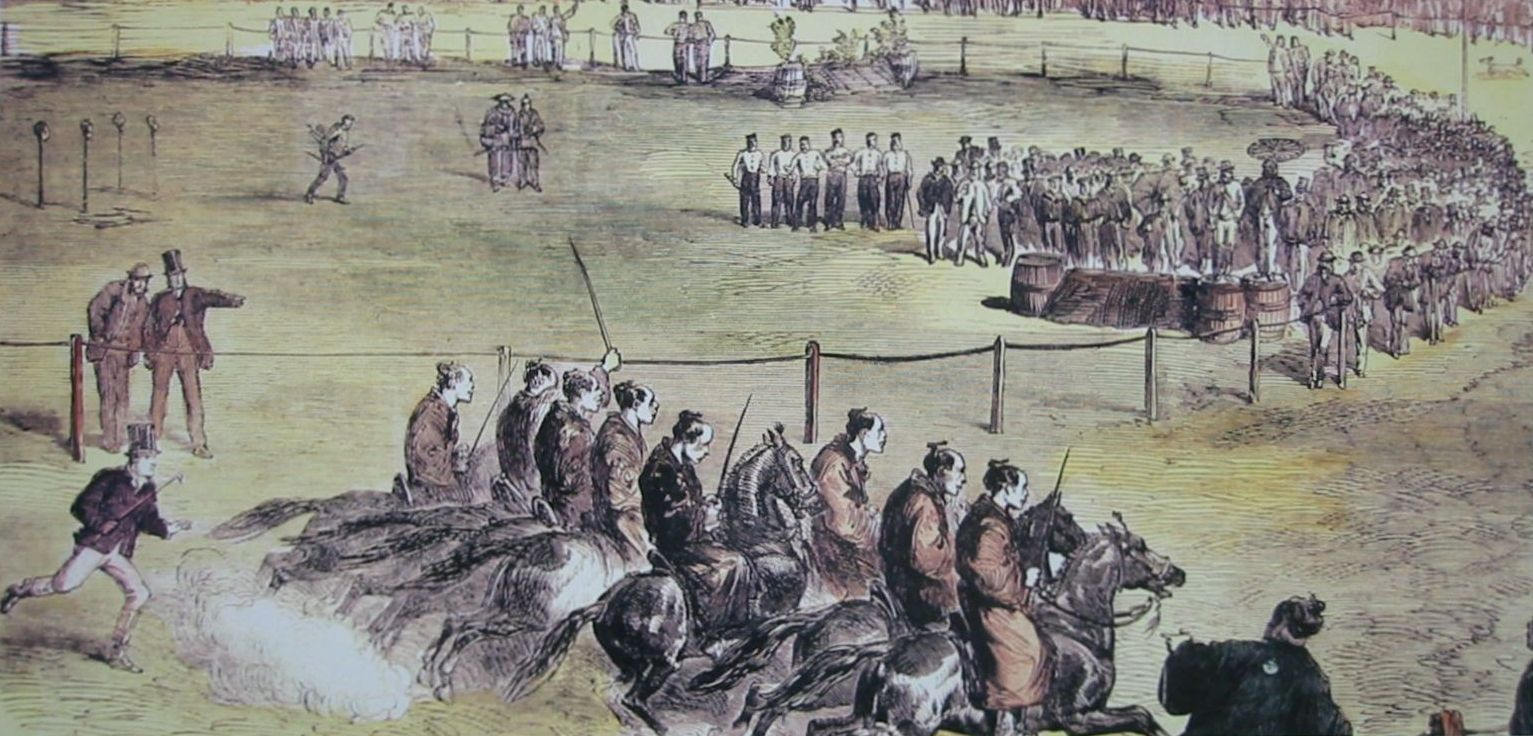
Samurai on horseback at Yokohama

After a series of informal races were held on the location often referred to as the Swamp Ground, in 1866 the Negishi Racecourse was constructed to provide a more permanent site adjacent to the expanding Yamate residential district. Initially intended as an entertainment venue for the foreign community, the racecourse rapidly became popular with Japanese society; the Emperor Meiji himself visiting on 14 separate occasions. The popularity of horse racing spread rapidly in the vicinity of other treaty ports; the Kobe Jockey Club, following the Yokohama precedent, was established in 1870.

Early in the development of the sport, Japan adopted an integrated approach to both thoroughbred breeding and racing. The close financially supportive relationship between these two industries enabled both to grow significantly during the post-Second World War economic boom. The Japan Racing Association was formally established in 1954.

The Japan Cup, one of the richest horse races in the world, was inaugurated in 1981. Run at Tokyo's Fuchu Racecourse on the last Sunday in November, it continues to attract thoroughbreds from all over the world.

== Japan Racing Association ==
The JRA manages the ten main tracks in Japan. Races at these tracks are called Chuo Keiba (meaning "central horse racing"). It provides some of the richest racing in the world. As of 2010, a typical JRA maiden race for three-year-olds carried a purse of ¥9.55 million (about US$112,000), with ¥5 million (about US$59,000) paid to the winner. Purses for graded stakes races begin at ¥74.6 million (about US$882,000).

The country's most prominent race is the Grade 1 Japan Cup, a 2,400 m (1 1/2 mi) invitational turf race run every November at Tokyo Racecourse for a purse of ¥476 million (about US$5.6 million), which used to be the richest turf race in the world. Other noted stakes races include the February Stakes, Takamatsunomiya Kinen, Yasuda Kinen, Takarazuka Kinen, Arima Kinen, and the Tenno Sho races run in the spring and autumn. The Satsuki Sho, Tokyo Yushun, and Kikuka Sho comprise the Japanese Triple Crown of Thoroughbred Racing.

== National Association of Racing ==
The NAR controls what is called Chihou Keiba (meaning "local horse racing"). The fifteen Chihou Keiba tracks are operated by municipal racing authorities and run under the affiliation of the National Association of Racing (NAR). These races are smaller than JRA races, with the exception of Minami-kanto Keiba (a group of four tracks - Oi, Urawa, Funabashi and Kawasaki). All tracks of Minami-kanto Keiba are located in the Kanto region, including many large cities.

Unlike the JRA, the NAR mainly organizes dirt graded events (except for Morioka Racecourse which has turf), of which the JRA has few, including the international Grade 1 race, Tokyo Daishōten, and a number of domestic Grade 1 events like the Teio Sho, Kashiwa Kinen and the Japan Breeders' Cup series.

The Great Recession caused serious problems for Chihou Keiba. Local government finances have suffered from growing cumulative deficits, leading some local governments to discuss whether to keep or close their horseracing facilities. In 2011, Arao City in Kumamoto prefecture decided to close its track, which was the oldest one in the NAR. Fukuyama City's racetrack was closed 2013.

== Restrictions ==
Horses belonging to the JRA cannot participate in NAR events unless they are designated "exchange races" or "Dirt-Graded races". The reverse applies to NAR horses, although they can participate in JRA Grade 1 turf events by either getting qualified in respective step races or winning a dirt/international Grade 1 event. Horse transfer between the JRA and the NAR is possible. Oguri Cap, the JRA Hall of Fame horse and Inari One, winner of the Arima Kinen in 1989, both debuted in NAR before transferring to JRA.

Although JRA racing is generally considered to be more popular and more competitive, sometimes NAR horses have represented Japan in races outside Japan instead of JRA horses. For example, Cosmo Bulk (from Hokkaido Keiba) won the Singapore Airlines International Cup in 2006 as a NAR horse.

As protection for the Japanese breeding industry, horses which were not bred in Japan (or in a few cases, not having a Japanese sire) were, in the past, usually barred from many important races, including the Triple Crown. The trend began to change in the early 90s, when progeny of imported stallions, particularly Tony Bin (Italy), Brian's Time and Sunday Silence (both US), had remarkable success in both racing and breeding. This was particularly the case with Sunday Silence, who was the leading sire for 10 years (his progeny would succeed him for another 3 years). Sunday Silence sired winners in Grade 1 races outside Japan (with Stay Gold winning the Dubai Sheema Classic and Hong Kong Vase, Hat Trick winning the Hong Kong Mile, and Heart's Cry also winning the Dubai Sheema Classic) and a number of graded races all over the world. Since the mid-2000s, most of the horses in Japan, including many overseas group race winner, had sires bred in Japan. Some of them also have a successful breeding record outside Japan; the daughter of Deep Impact, Beauty Parlour won the French classic race, the Poule d'Essai des Pouliches in 2012; the son of Hat Trick, Dabirsim was honored with Cartier Two-Year-Old Colt Award winner in 2011; the daughter of Deep Impact, Snowfall won the Epsom Oaks by a margin of 16 lengths in 2021; and the son of Deep Impact, Irish-bred Auguste Rodin have made the greatest success by winning six Group 1 races including the Epsom Derby, Irish Derby, Irish Champion Stakes and the Breeders' Cup Turf in 2023.

Since the early 2000s, most of the bars on non-Japanese bred horses and sires have been lifted. For example, the Tokyo Yushun started allowing foreign bred horses in 2001, with the American-bred Kurofune entering in the race that year and finishing fifth.

== Jump racing ==
Japan's top jump race is the Nakayama Grand Jump, run every April at Nakayama Racecourse. Instead of running over a large course as is the case in other countries, the course for the 4,250 m (2 5/8 mi) Nakayama Grand Jump follows a twisted path on the inside portion of Nakayama's racing ovals. The race carries a purse of ¥142.5 million (about US$1.68 million). In Japan, jump racing is generally less popular than flat racing. Racecourses do not hold more than two jump races in a single day.

Every Japanese jump horse has experience of running on the flat. Usually, all of them aim for success on the flat. They are only trained for jumping after they have retired from the flat. In Japan, unlike Europe, very few horses are bred specifically for jumping.

== Famous jockeys ==
The top jockey in Japan is Yutaka Take, who is a multiple champion in his homeland and regularly rides Japanese horses in stakes races around the world. Yutaka Take was the regular jockey for Deep Impact, the 2005 Japan Triple Crown winner and JRA's two time Horse of the Year (2005–06), as well as Kitasan Black, another horse who was awarded the Horse of the Year two years in a row (2016-17). He's also the jockey with the most JRA leading jockey titles, winning the JRA Award for Best Jockey (races won) a total of 18 times (1989, 1990, 1992-2000, 2002-2008).

From 1994, the JRA began to grant short-term riding licenses (allowing a maximum of 3 months in a year) to foreign jockeys. Many world-class jockeys have taken an active part in Japanese horse racing using these short-term licenses, including Olivier Peslier, Christophe Soumillon, Mirco Demuro (elder brother of Cristian Demuro, who has also participated in JRA races), Christophe Lemaire, Craig Williams, Ryan Moore, Joao Moreira, Oisin Murphy, Damian Lane, Rachel King, and Bauyrzhan Murzabayev.

Since 2014, the JRA has additionally begun to allow full-year licenses to foreign jockeys, with Mirco Demuro and Christophe Lemaire taking these licenses in 2015. Lemaire went on to become the leading jockey for four years straight, from 2017 to 2021.

The horse Victoire Pisa won the richest race, the Dubai World Cup in 2011, under Mirco Demuro.

Other notable jockeys:

- Nanako Fujita - JRA's most successful female jockey
- Yuichi Fukunaga - 2013 JRA leading jockey, jockey of Contrail and Just A Way, turned trainer in 2023
- Yoichi Fukunaga - father of Yuichi, JRA Hall of Fame inductee, 9-time JRA leading jockey (1970 - 1978; second most in JRA history)
- Kenichi Ikezoe - jockey of Orfevre, Dream Journey and Curren Chan
- Koshiro Take - younger brother of Yutaka, turned trainer in 2018
- Kunihiko Take - father of Yutaka and Koshiro, jockey of Tosho Boy, turned trainer in 1985
- Norihiro Yokoyama - three time Derby winner
- Kazuo Yokoyama - son of Norihiro, jockey of Titleholder
- Takeshi Yokoyama - son of Norihiro, younger brother of Kazuo, jockey of Efforia
- Takemi Kaga - 7-time JRA leading jockey (1962-1966, 1968, 1969; third most in JRA history)
- Yukio Okabe - jockey of Symboli Rudolf and Taiki Shuttle
- Hitoshi Matoba - jockey of Rice Shower and Grass Wonder, turned trainer in 2002
- Katsumi Ando - debuted in the NAR. Jockey of King Kamehameha, Daiwa Major and Daiwa Scarlet
- Hirofumi Shii - jockey of Agnes Digital and Vodka, turned trainer in 2021
- Ryuji Wada - jockey of T M Opera O, turned trainer in 2026
- Yasunari Iwata - debuted in the NAR. Melbourne Cup winner, 2011 and 2012 JRA leading jockey, jockey of Buena Vista, Gentildonna and Lord Kanaloa
- Fumio Matoba - NAR jockey with most career wins in Japan
- Keita Tosaki - debuted in the NAR. 2014, 2015 and 2016 JRA leading jockey
- Masayoshi Ebina - jockey of El Condor Pasa, Apapane and Fenomeno; turned trainer in 2022
- Yuga Kawada - 2022 JRA leading jockey; jockey of Liberty Island; first Japanese jockey to win a Breeders' Cup race (Loves Only You, 2021 Filly & Mare Turf)
- Seiki Tabara - jockey of Mayano Top Gun
- Kohei Matsuyama - jockey of Daring Tact
- Ryusei Sakai – jockey of Forever Young
- Seina Imamura – jockey of Juryoku Pierrot, the first Japanese female jockey winning JRA's Grade 1 race

== Major horse races ==
(Note on Japanese words in the names; Kinen: Memorial, Hai: Cup, Shō: Prize, Yūshun: excellent horse)

February

- February Stakes (Dirt 1600m)

March

- Takamatsunomiya Kinen (Turf 1200m)
- Ōsaka Hai (Turf 2000m)

April

- Oka Shō (Japanese 1000 Guineas) (Turf 1600m) - the first leg for the Triple Tiara
- Satsuki Shō (Japanese 2000 Guineas) (Turf 2000m) - the first leg for the Triple Crown

May

- Tenno Sho (Spring) (Turf 3200m)
- NHK Mile Cup (Turf 1600m)
- Victoria Mile (Turf 1600m)
- Yūshun Himba (Japanese Oaks) (Turf 2400m) - the second leg for the Triple Tiara
- Tōkyō Yūshun (Japanese Derby) (Turf 2400m) - the second leg for the Triple Crown

June

- Yasuda Kinen (Turf 1600m)
- Takarazuka Kinen (Turf 2200m)

September

- Sprinters Stakes (Turf 1200m)

October

- Shūka Shō (Turf 2000m) - the final leg for the Triple Tiara
- Kikuka-shō (Japanese St. Leger) (Turf 3000m) - the final leg for the Triple Crown
- Tennō Shō (Autumn) (Turf 2000m)

November

- Queen Elizabeth II Cup (Turf 2200m)
- Mile Championship (Turf 1600m)
- Japan Cup (Turf 2400m) - the richest purse race in Japan

December

- Champions Cup (Dirt 1800m)
- Hanshin Juvenile Fillies (Turf 1600m)
- Asahi Hai Futurity Stakes (Turf 1600m)
- Arima Kinen (Grand Prix) (Turf 2500m) - the world's biggest betting race
- Hopeful Stakes (Turf 2000m)
- Tokyo Daishōten (Dirt 2000m) - the only NAR race with international Grade I rating

=== Japan Road to the Kentucky Derby ===
The following races are designated as preliminaries for the Kentucky Derby.

- November: Cattleya Stakes (Dirt 1600m)
- December: Zen-Nippon Nisai Yushun (Dirt 1600m)
- February: Hyacinth Stakes (Dirt 1600m)
- March: Fukuryu Stakes (Dirt 1800m)

== See also ==
- Bajutsu
- Sunday Silence - the leading sire 1995-2007 in Japan.
- Deep Impact - undefeated Japanese Triple Crown horse in 2005 and the leading sire 2012-2020.
- Orfevre - twice runner-up in the Prix de l'Arc de Triomphe, 2012 and 2013, each time losing to a filly bearing lighter weight.
- Umamusume: Pretty Derby - multimedia franchise featuring anthropomorphized representations of real Japanese horses and races
