= Mitsuishi River =

River in Japan

Mitsuishi River 三石川
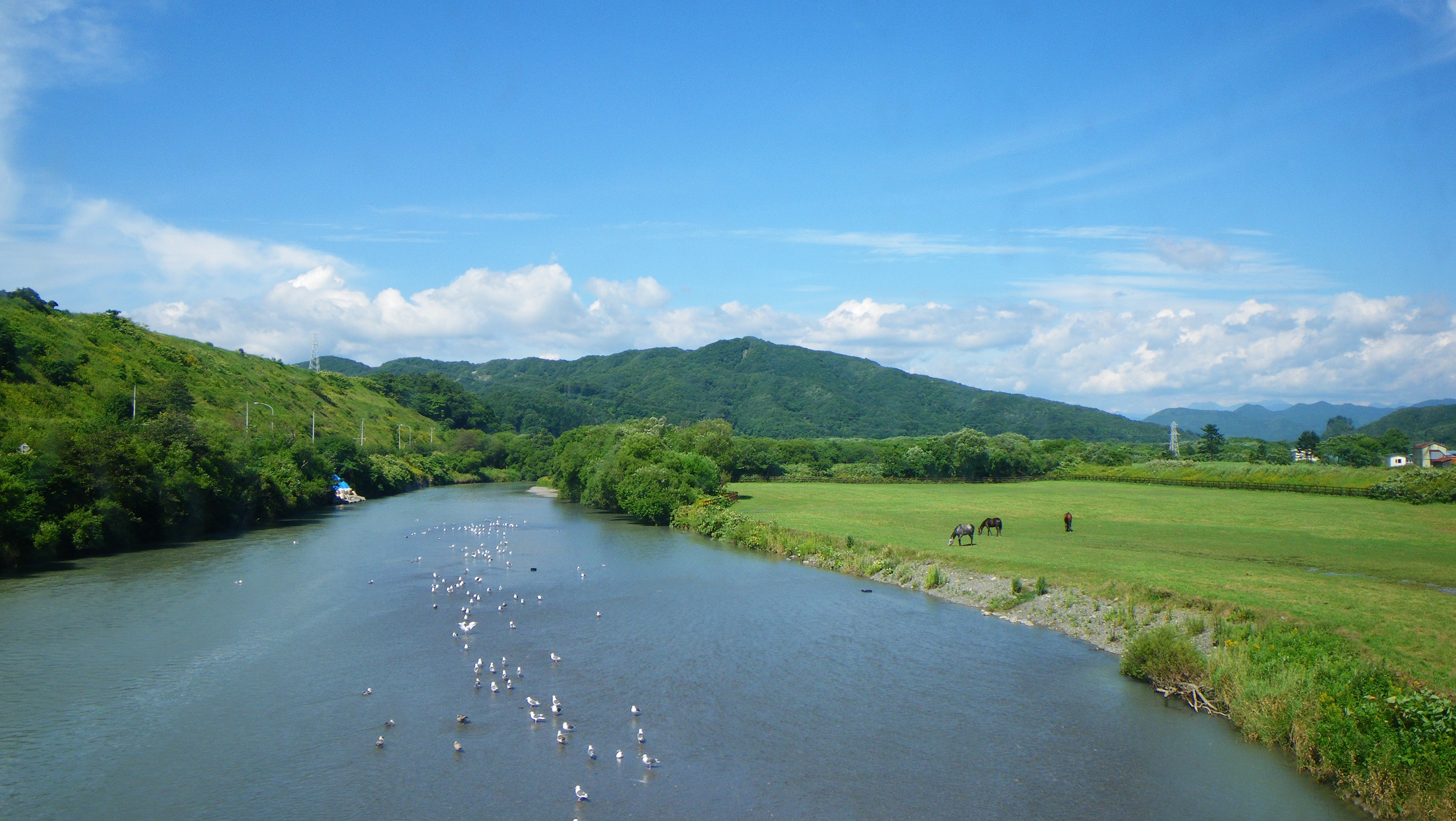

- Location within Japan
- Native name: Mitsuishi-gawa (Japanese)

Location
- Country: Japan
- State: Hokkaido
- Region: Hidaka
- District: Hidaka
- Municipality: Shinhidaka

Physical characteristics
- Source: Mount Setaushi, Hidaka Mountains
  - location: Shinhidaka, Hokkaido, Japan
  - coordinates: 42°25′17″N 142°41′30″E
  - elevation: 280 m (920 ft)
- Mouth: Pacific Ocean
  - location: Shinhidaka, Hokkaido, Japan
  - coordinates: 42°14′40″N 142°34′11″E
  - elevation: 0 m (0 ft)
- Length: 31.6 km (19.6 mi)
- Basin size: 159.4 km^{2} (61.5 sq mi)

Mitsuishi River (三石川, Mitsuishi-gawa) is a river in Hokkaido, Japan. It is 31.6 kilometers (19.6 mi) in length and has a drainage area of 159.4 square kilometers (61.5 sq mi).

== Course ==
The Mitsuishi River originates at Mount Setaushi (859 kilometers (534 mi)) in the Hidaka Mountains and flows roughly south to southwest. The river flows into a reservoir at the Mitsuishi Dam. The Mitsuishi Dam was completed on the river in 1992 to prevent the flow of earth and sand from the Pirashike area (ピラシケ地区, Pirashike-chiku), which is prone to landslides. It then continues until it reaches the Pacific Ocean at Mitsuishi in Shinhidaka, Hokkaido.

== Tributaries ==
- Pishunbebō River (ピシュンベボウ川, Pishunbebō-gawa) (left)
- Rubetsube River (ルベシベ川, Rubetsube-gawa) (right)
- Bebō River (left)
- Nobushitsu River (延出川, Nobushitsu-gawa) (left)
- Utsuma River (ウツマ川, Utsuma-gawa) (right)
- Futamata River (二股川, Futamata-gawa) (left)
- Pirashuke River (ピラシュケ川, Pirashuke-gawa) (left)
- Migikyūgō River (右九号川, Migikyūgō-gawa) or Ninth River on the Right (right)
