= Shinhidaka Ainu Museum =

- 新ひだか町アイヌ民俗資料館
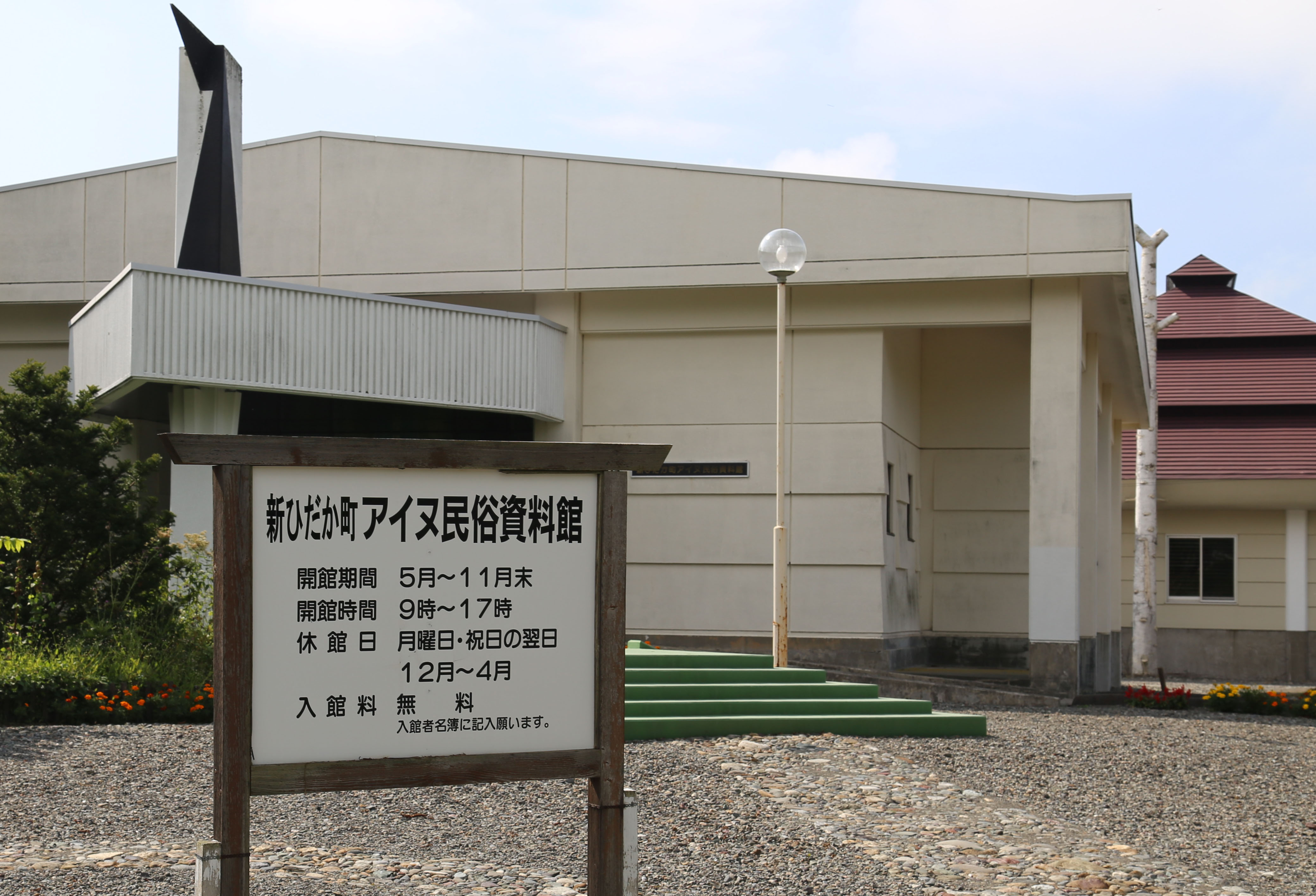
- Interactive map of the Shinhidaka Ainu Museum area

General information
- Location: 7-1 Shizunaimauta, Shinhidaka, Hokkaidō, Japan
- Coordinates: 42°19′49″N 142°22′36″E
- Opened: 1983

Shinhidaka Ainu Museum (新ひだか町アイヌ民俗資料館, Shinhidaka-chō Ainu Minzoku Shiryōkan) is a museum of Ainu materials in Shinhidaka, Hokkaidō, Japan. The display has an area dedicated to Shakushain's 1669 revolt over fishing rights on the Shizunai River and swords and iron vessels excavated from local chashi. The collection also includes the skull of an Ezo wolf that has been designated a Municipal Cultural Property. Shinhidaka itself is a relatively new town, formed in 2006 from the merger of the former towns of Mitsuishi and Shizunai. Located in what was once Shizunai, the museum first opened in 1983 as the Shizunai Ainu Museum (静内町アイヌ民俗資料館).

== See also ==
- National Ainu Museum
- Shinhidaka Town Museum
