= Hidaka Province =

Former province of Japan

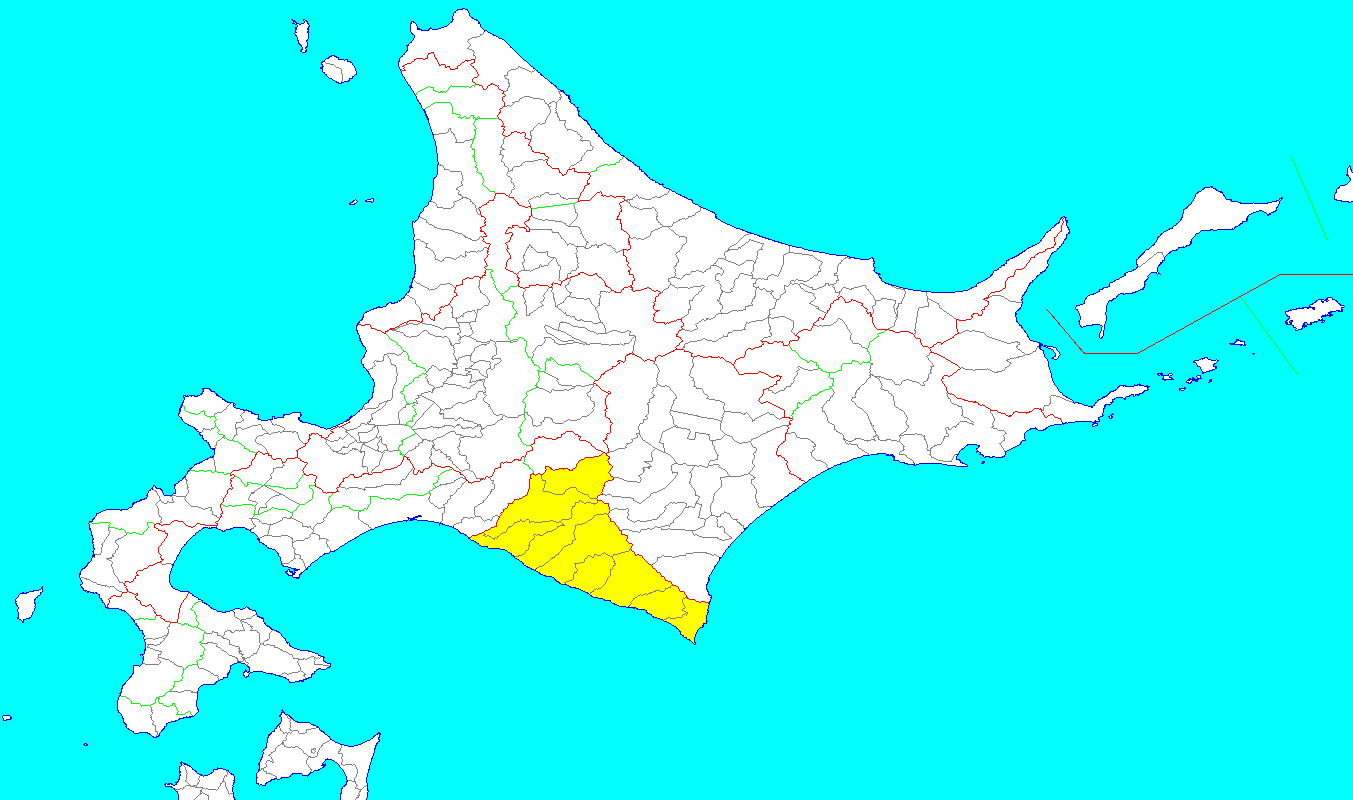
Location of Hidaka Province c. 1869.

Hidaka Province (日高国, Hidaka no Kuni; Japanese pronunciation: [çí.dä̀.kä̀ (nò̞ kɯ̈̀.ɲ̟ì)]) was a short-lived province located in Hokkaidō. It corresponded to modern-day Hidaka Subprefecture. The name "'Hidaka" is derived from "Hitakami" (日高見国).

== History ==
After 1869, the northern Japanese island was known as Hokkaido; and regional administrative subdivisions were identified, including Hidaka Province.

- August 15, 1869 Hidaka Province established with 7 districts
- 1872 Census finds a population of 6,574
- 1882 Provinces dissolved in Hokkaidō.

== Districts ==
- Saru (沙流郡)
- Niikappu (新冠郡)
- Shizunai (静内郡)
- Mitsuishi (三石郡)
- Urakawa (浦河郡)
- Samani (様似郡)
- Horoizumi (幌泉郡)

== Other websites ==
Media related to Hidaka Province at Wikimedia Commons

- Murdoch's map of provinces, 1903
