= Hidaka District =

Hidaka District may refer to the following districts in Japan:

- Hidaka District, Wakayama
- Hidaka District, Hokkaido
