= Ten Point =

Japanese-bred Thoroughbred racehorse (1973–1978)

Ten Point テンポイント
- Breed: Thoroughbred
- Sire: Contrite
- Grandsire: Never Say Die
- Dam: Wakakumo
- Damsire: Cover Up Nisei
- Sex: Colt
- Foaled: April 19, 1973
- Died: March 5, 1978 (aged 4)
- Country: Japan
- Color: Chestnut
- Breeder: Yoshida Farm
- Owner: Hisanari Takada
- Racing colours
- Trainer: Sasuke Ogawa
- Jockey: Akira Shikato
- Record: 18: 11-4-1
- Earnings: ¥328,415,400

Major wins
- Hanshin Sansai Stakes (1975); Tenno Sho (Spring) (1977); Arima Kinen (1977)

Awards
- Yushun Award for Best Two-Year-Old Colt (1975); Yushun Award for Best Older Male Horse (1977); Japanese Horse of the Year (1977); Yushun Public Prize (1978)

Honours
- JRA Hall of Fame (1990)

Ten Point (Japanese: テンポイント, Hepburn: Ten Pointo; April 19, 1973 – March 5, 1978) was a racehorse registered by the Japan Racing Association. Ten Point, Tosho Boy, and Green Grass were a group of Thoroughbred horses referred to as TTG.

Ten Point debuted in August 1975 as a racehorse. He gathered attention in a classic race in Kansai and was named "Prince of the Shooting Star" due to his facial features and chestnut coat. He did not win the classic race, but he managed to win the Spring Tenno Sho and the Arima Kinen at the age of four. His match race with Tosho Boy in the 1977 Arima Kinen race is regarded as an extremely iconic race in horse racing history. In January 1978, Ten Point had a bone fracture in the middle of the Japanese Economy New Year Cup and died after 43 days of treatment.

Ten Point won the JRA Award for Best Two-Year-Old Colt in 1975 and the JRA Award for Best Older Male Horse in 1977. He was elected to the Japan Racing Association Hall of Fame in 1990. Akira Shikato was Ten Point's jockey.

== Life ==
=== Before debut ===
Ten Point was born on April 19, 1973, on Yoshida Farm, located in Hayakita, Hokkaido. Ten Point's father, exported into Japan, was a stallion named Contrite that was in a syndicate. Ten Point's mother, Wakakumo, was a winner in the 1966 Oka Sho race. Regarding these two horses' breeding, Yoshida Farm's Shigeo Yoshida said, "I don't know how making this Contrite stallion my center focus will turn out, but I've created and put him in a syndicate, so this has to succeed. To do that, I have to have a good broodmare to produce a good child horse." According to Yoshida Farm's Haruo Yoshida, Ten Point was born with a form of "perfect quality." Ten Point was soon bought by Hisanari Takada for ¥15,000,000 and then it was decided that he would be managed by Sasuke Ogawa in a stable at the Rittō Training Center. Before the purchase, Ogawa said that Ten Point's entire body moved like a spring when he was at Yoshida Farm.

According to people involved at Yoshida Farm, Ten Point in his early childhood was clever enough not to go against humans and was always with his mother due to his dependent nature. When Ten Point's trainer chased him in order to make him exercise, he had extraordinarily fast running speed but was burdened with a delicate body and when he was the age of two, he injured the knee bone of his foreleg. Ten Point was supplied with milk for nutrition at an early age. Ten Point was fond of this milk and when he was fighting illness in 1978, he was given milk everyday per Yoshida Farm's recommendation.

=== Career ===
==== 1975: three-year-old season ====
Ten Point entered Ogawa Stable in March 1975. On August 17, Ten Point debuted in a match at the Hakodate Racecourse. Ten Point excelled three days prior at training and it was estimated that he had a 50% chance of winning. He became the most backed horse for the race. Ten Point started off well and then proceeded to keep his distance from the second place horse and maintain his first-place position for the remainder of the race. He beat the 1000m record at the Hakodate Racecourse by 0.5 seconds. After this race, he was reviewed to be a suitable Japanese Classic Race contestant.

After that race, Ogawa, his trainer, decided he would participate in two more races by the end of the year. His next race was set to be held in October, but due to excessive heat, it was moved to November. Ten Point won the race.

Ten Point participated in the Hanshin Sansai Stakes. He was backed as the most popular choice for victory with a chance of over 50%. After passing the third corner, he dropped from third to sixth place without his bit and even his jockey gave up hope, but he started advancing forward at the fourth corner. He went straight ahead and halfway there, he reached first place and kept adding distance from other horses to maintain this position. He won and achieved another new record, beating the older horses that were participating in a different race the same day. He ended the 1975 season with three wins and zero losses. He was also won the JRA Award for Best Two-Year-Old Colt this year.

==== 1976: four-year-old season ====
By winning the Hanshin Three-year-old Stakes, Ten Point became recognized as a classic race contestant. He had Ten Point participate in the Kyōdō Tsūshin Hai to prepare for the Tokyo Yūshun at the Tokyo Racecourse. After that, they stayed at the Nakayama Racecourse and planned for the Satsuki Shō. Ten Point's management and training was left up to the jockey Akira Shikato and the groomer Yamada.

In the 1976 Tokyo Three-year-old Stakes, Ten Point went straight towards the slope and was victorious overall, but Climb Kaiser finished in a close second place. Ten Point also won the Satsuki Shō prep Spring Stakes, but the horse in second place was close once again. At the Satsuki Shō, Ten Point entered as the favorite, but was defeated by Tosho Boy. His next race was the Tokyo Yūshun, the race his owners had been targeting since the year began. Ten Point was the second favorite, but in the race he seemed unable to accelerate off the final corner, and finished only seventh. After the race, it was discovered Ten Point had developed a fracture on his left-front leg, and as such it was necessary to rest him until the injury healed.

Ten Point was returned to racing at the Kyōto Daishōten, with the intent of preparing him to run the final of the Classic races a few weeks later, the Kikuka-shō. He placed third in the Kyōto Daishōten. At the Kikuka-shō, he entered as the third favorite, behind Tosho Boy and Climb Kaiser. In the race, the 12th favorite Green Grass instead took victory, while Ten Point placed second. Green Grass was not yet regarded highly prior to this, though later would form part of the "TTG" between Ten Point, Tosho Boy, and himself.

Ten Point's final race of 1976 was the year-ending Arima Kinen. Ten Point ran well, but was ultimately passed by Tosho Boy, and lost by 2 1/2 lengths.

==== 1977: five-year-old season ====
After losing out on multiple major victories in 1976, Ten Point became known as the "Nobleman of Misfortune" by some. Ten Point's owner intended to buck this name by attempting to win the Spring Tenno Sho. In preparation, Ten Point was entered in to two races beforehand, the Kyōto Kinen and the Naruo Kinen. Ten Point won both. He was the favorite entering the Tenno Sho, and followed up by taking the lead off the final corner and taking the victory.

The next goal for Ten Point would be the Takarazuka Kinen. At this race, Tosho Boy returned to racing after several months off recovering from injuries. Ten Point entered as the favorite, but was unable to beat Tosho Boy, who defeated Ten Point and set a record for fastest final 1000 meters in Japan at that time. Following the Takarzuka Kinen, Ten Point was invited to participate in the Baltimore Washington International Turf Cup in the United States, but his owners declined to focus on trying to defeat Tosho Boy at the season ending Arima Kinen.

Ten Point was rested for the summer before returned to racing at the Kyōto Daishōten again, where he took victory by several lengths. At the end of the year, he was entered in to the Arima Kinen and was expected to fight directly with Tosho Boy. Ten Point entered as the favorite, while Tosho Boy was second favorite. The two started behind Green Grass at the start before drawing ahead and having a head-to-head match for the majority of the race. In the final straight, Ten Point pulled ahead of Tosho Boy and took victory, finally marking his first win over Tosho Boy. The race was at the time regarded as one of the greatest in the history of Japanese horse racing.

At the end of the season, Ten Point was unanimously voted as JRA Horse of the Year, the first horse since Meiji Hikari in 1956 to receive all votes for the award.

=== Form ===
Ten Point won 11 races and scored five podium places out of 18 starts. This data is available based on JBIS, netkeiba.

Date	Track	Race	Distance (Condition)	Entry	HN	Odds (Favored)	Finish	Time	Margins	Jockey	Winner (Runner-up)
1975 – three-year-old season
Aug 17	Hakodate	3yo Newcomer	1,000 m (Firm)	9	8	2.1 (1)	1st	R0:58.8	–1.6	Akira Shikato	(Grand Yamato)
Nov 9	Kyoto	Momiji Stakes	1,400 m (Good)	14	10	2.0 (1)	1st	1:25.4	–1.5	Akira Shikato	(Takami Aura)
Dec 7	Hanshin	Hanshin Sansai Stakes	1,600 m (Heavy)	14	10	2.0 (1)	1st	1:37.1	–1.1	Akira Shikato	(Golden Tateyama)
1976 – four-year-old season
Feb 15	Tokyo	Tokyo Yonsai Stakes	1,800 m (Firm)	6	2	1.6 (1)	1st	1:49.6	–0.1	Akira Shikato	(Climb Kaiser)
Mar 28	Nakayama	Spring Stakes	1,800 m (Good)	6	1	1.4 (1)	1st	1:52.4	–0.1	Akira Shikato	(Mejiro Sagami)
Apr 25	Tokyo	Satsuki Sho	2,000 m (Firm)	15	12	2.5 (1)	2nd	2:02.4	0.8	Akira Shikato	Tosho Boy
May 30	Tokyo	Tokyo Yushun	2,400 m (Firm)	28	5	5.1 (2)	7th	2:29.6	2.0	Kunihiko Take	Climb Kaiser
Oct 17	Kyoto	Kyoto Daishoten	2,400 m (Firm)	14	7	14.2 (6)	3rd	2:27.4	0.1	Akira Shikato	Passing Venture
Nov 14	Kyoto	Kikuka Sho	3,000 m (Soft)	21	13	13.4 (3)	2nd	3:10.3	0.4	Akira Shikato	Green Grass
Dec 19	Nakayama	Arima Kinen	2,500 m (Firm)	14	12	8.2 (3)	2nd	2:34.2	0.2	Akira Shikato	Tosho Boy
1977 – five-year-old season
Feb 13	Kyoto	Kyoto Kinen	2,400 m (Soft)	13	2	1.9 (1)	1st	2:27.2	–0.1	Akira Shikato	(Star Barge)
Mar 27	Hanshin	Naruo Kinen	2,400 m (Soft)	9	3	3.7 (1)	1st	2:32.6	–0.1	Akira Shikato	(Keishu Ford)
Apr 29	Kyoto	Tenno Sho (Spring)	3,200 m (Good)	14	10	2.4 (1)	1st	3:21.7	–0.1	Akira Shikato	(Crown Pillar)
Jun 5	Hanshin	Takarazuka Kinen	2,200 m (Firm)	6	3	2.7 (1)	2nd	2:13.1	0.1	Akira Shikato	Tosho Boy
Oct 16	Kyoto	Kyoto Daishoten	2,400 m (Firm)	9	1	2.1 (1)	1st	2:27.9	–1.3	Akira Shikato	(Saiko Musashi)
Nov 12	Tokyo	4yo+ Open	1,800 m (Firm)	5	1	1.4 (1)	1st	1:47.5	–0.3	Akira Shikato	(Longhawk)
Dec 18	Nakayama	Arima Kinen	2,500 m (Firm)	8	3	2.6 (1)	1st	2:35.4	–0.1	Akira Shikato	(Tosho Boy)
1978 – six-year-old season
Jan 22	Kyoto	Nihon Keizai Shinshun Hai	2,400 m (Firm)	9	1	1.8 (1)	DNF	–	–	Akira Shikato	Zinc Eight

Legend:
Turf

- R indicated that it was a record time finish
- Bold races indicated that it was a part of the eight major races (八大競走)

== Death ==
After Ten Point's highly successful 1977 season, his owners prepared for racing him internationally in 1978. As a send-off before being sent to Europe, he was entered in to the Nikkei Shinshun Hai in January. However, disaster struck in the race, as Ten Point severely broke his left-hind leg. Surgery was carried out the following day, and efforts were made to rehabilitate Ten Point's leg. His condition did not improve after surgery. By mid-February, veterinarians reported that the afflicted area had begun rotting and exposing bone, while at the same time they reported that his right-hind leg had developed laminitis. In early March, his condition began to deteriorate rapidly, and recovery efforts were abandoned, with his vets switching to palliative care.

On the morning of 5 March 1978, Ten Point went in to convulsions, and died at approximately 8:40 a.m. Ten Point's cause of death was official given as heart failure and general weakness brought on by his race injury, with euthanasia not being administered until the last possible moment. A funeral was held for Ten Point on 7 March at the Ritto Training Center. A second funeral was held on 10 March at Yoshida Farm, where Ten Point's remains were then buried. Roughly 400 people attended the funeral, including Japanese horse racing officials.

== Legacy ==
Ten Point's death brought several aspects of Japanese horse racing in to further discussion, including the use of euthanasia versus attempted rehabilitation on injured horses, the racing of horses during cold winter months, and the use of heavy weights as part of the handicapping process in horse racing. Ten Point's owners remarked that they had not euthanized Ten Point at the time of his injury as they could not bear killing a living thing, but others claimed that the lack of euthanasia only prolonged the horse's suffering before he died anyway. In response to Ten Point's fatal injury, the Japan Racing Association started a review of their handicapping process, and changed a tendency to assign excessively heavy weights.

In 1990, Ten Point was elected in to the Japan Racing Association Hall of Fame based on his significant contribution to Japanese horse racing.

== Pedigree ==
Pedigree of Ten Point
Sire Contrite	Never Say Die	Nasrullah	Nearco
Sire Contrite	Never Say Die	Nasrullah	Mumtaz Begum
Sire Contrite	Never Say Die	Singing Grass	War Admiral
Sire Contrite	Never Say Die	Singing Grass	Borealle
Sire Contrite	Penitence	Petition	Fair Trial
Sire Contrite	Penitence	Petition	Art Paper
Sire Contrite	Penitence	Bootless	The Cobbler
Sire Contrite	Penitence	Bootless	Careless Nora
Dam Wakakumo	Cover Up Nisei	Cover Up	Alibhai
Dam Wakakumo	Cover Up Nisei	Cover Up	Bel Amour
Dam Wakakumo	Cover Up Nisei	Betty Martin	Hollyrood
Dam Wakakumo	Cover Up Nisei	Betty Martin	Rhoda F.
Dam Wakakumo	Kumowaka	Theft	Tetratema
Dam Wakakumo	Kumowaka	Theft	Voleuse
Dam Wakakumo	Kumowaka	Eregiyaratomasu (エレギヤラトマス)	Sir Gallahad
Dam Wakakumo	Kumowaka	Eregiyaratomasu (エレギヤラトマス)	Ima Baby
