= Hitakami =

Hitakami (日高見国 (ひたかみのくに, Hitakami No Kuni)) is a country name found in ancient Japanese texts. There are different theories as to which country the word "Hitakami" may have represented. According to Ōharaenokotoba (大祓詞), the word "Hitakami" represented the country of Yamato because the full name of Yamato is "Ōyamato Hitakami No Kuni" (大倭日高見国). However, in works such as the Nihon Shoki (日本書紀) the word "Hitakami" was used to represent the northeastern regions of what is now Japan.

The name of the old Japanese province Hidaka Province (日高国), which corresponds to modern-day Hidaka Subprefecture in Hokkaido, is derived from the name "Hitakami".

== See also ==
- Emishi
