= Kunihiko Take =

Japanese jockey and trainer (1938–2016)

Kunihiko Take 武邦彦
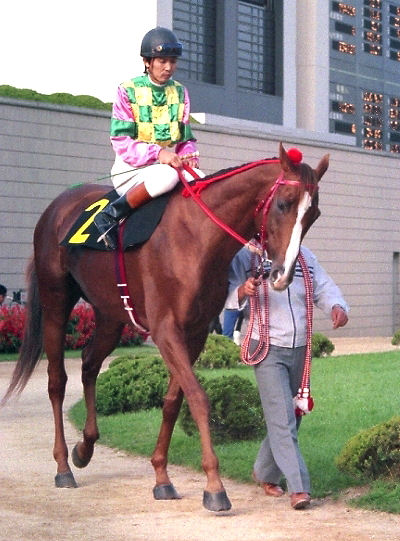
- Kunihiko Take aboard Happy Progress at the 1984 Swan Stakes

Personal information
- Nationality: Japanese
- Born: 20 October 1938 Hakodate, Hokkaido, Japan
- Died: 12 August 2016 (aged 77)
- Occupation: Jockey / Trainer / Commentator
- Height: 172 cm (5 ft 8 in)

Horse racing career
- Sport: Horse racing
- Career wins: 1,163 (JRA, as jockey); 375 (JRA, as trainer)

Honors
- First Kansai-based jockey to reach 1,000 wins JRA Award for Best Trainer (1989)

Significant horses
- Bamboo Memory, Mejiro Bailey, Tosho Boy, Kitanokachidoki, Long Ace, Achieve Star

Kunihiko Take (武 邦彦, Take Kunihiko) (October 20, 1938 – August 12, 2016) was a Japanese jockey, horse trainer, and racing commentator. He competed in the Japan Racing Association (JRA) from 1957 to 1985.

He recorded 1,163 JRA victories as a jockey, including eight classic (八大競走) wins, and was the first Kansai-based jockey to reach 1,000 career wins. After retiring from riding in 1985, he transitioned to training, where he conditioned horses such as Bamboo Memory and Mejiro Bailey.

He was the father of jockey Yutaka Take and trainer Koshiro Take.

== Early life ==
Kunihiko Take was born in Hakodate, Hokkaido, on October 20, 1938. His grandfather was a disciple of Hakodate Daikyo, and his father was a member of the Hokkaido Horse Owners' Association. He spent his early years at his family's Sonoda Farm before it was affected by post-war land reform.

In his second year of middle school, he moved to Kyoto to become an apprentice jockey under his uncle, trainer Heizo Take. After passing his licensing exam at age 19, he made his professional riding debut in March 1957.

== Riding career ==
Fellow jockey Yuji Nohira noted Take's riding style, which he described as placing minimal physical burden on the horse.

In 1972, Take won the Oka Sho aboard Achieve Star and the Tokyo Yushun (Japanese Derby) aboard Long Ace. He subsequently won the Kikuka Sho three times (1973, 1974, 1978) and rode Tosho Boy to victory in the 1976 Arima Kinen and 1977 Takarazuka Kinen.

On January 7, 1980, Take became the fifth jockey in JRA history, and the first based in the Kansai region, to reach 1,000 career wins. He retired from riding on February 24, 1985, with 1,163 wins from 7,679 starts, including 80 graded stakes victories.

== Training career ==
Following his retirement as a jockey, Take obtained a trainer's license and opened a stable at the Ritto Training Center in 1987.

In 1989, he trained Bamboo Memory to victory in the Yasuda Kinen (GI), followed by the Sprinters Stakes (GI) and Takamatsunomiya Hai (GII) in 1990. Bamboo Memory was named the JRA Best Sprinter or Miler in 1989 and 1990.

In 2000, he trained Mejiro Bailey to win the Asahi Hai Futurity Stakes (GI). Over his 22-year training career, he saddled 375 winners from 4,193 starters before reaching the mandatory retirement age of 70 on February 28, 2009.

== Personal life ==
Take had four sons, two of whom entered the horse racing industry:

- Yutaka Take (born 1969): Jockey.
- Koshiro Take (born 1971): Jockey and later trainer.

Take was 172 cm tall. He died at a hospital in Shiga Prefecture on August 12, 2016, at the age of 77.

== Major wins ==
=== As a jockey ===
Japan

- Arima Kinen - (1) - Tosho Boy (1976)
- Tokyo Yushun - (1) - Long Ace (1972)
- Kikuka Sho - (3) - Take Hope (1973), Kitanokachidoki (1974), Inter Gushiken (1978)
- Oka Sho - (2) - Achieve Star (1972), Takano Kaori (1974)
- Satsuki Sho - (1) - Kitanokachidoki (1974)
- Takarazuka Kinen - (1) - Tosho Boy (1977)
- Queen Elizabeth II Cup - (1) - Lead Swallow (1978)

=== As a trainer ===
Japan

- Yasuda Kinen - (1) - Bamboo Memory (1989)
- Sprinters Stakes - (1) - Bamboo Memory (1990)
- Asahi Hai Futurity Stakes - (1) - Mejiro Bailey (2000)
- Takamatsunomiya Hai - (1) - Bamboo Memory (1990)
