= Mitsuishi, Hokkaido =

Dissolved municipality in Hokkaido, Japan

Mitsuishi 三石町 みついしちょう
- Town
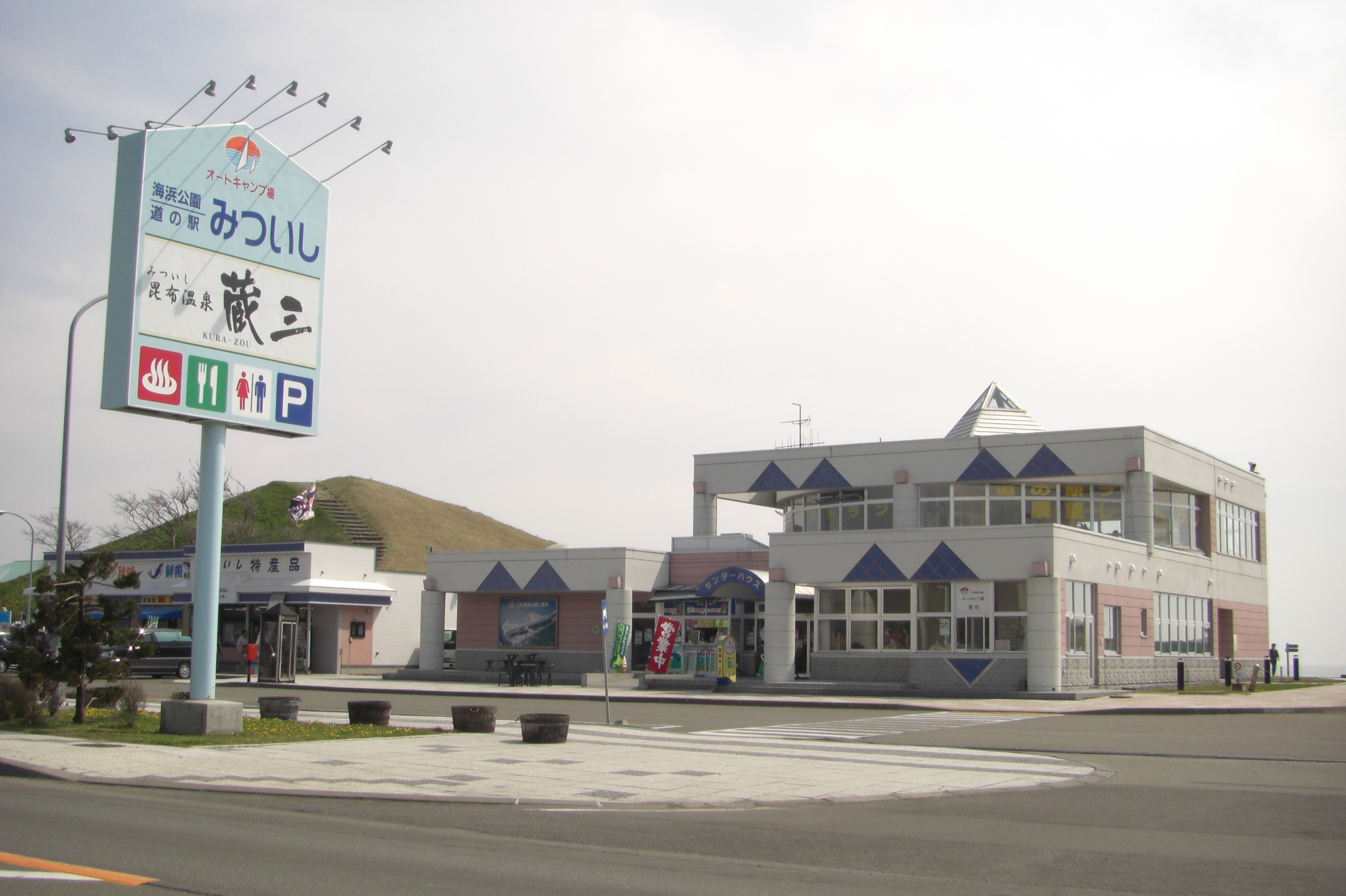
- Mitsuishi roadside station

- Flag Seal
- Interactive map of Mitsuishi
- Country: Japan
- Region: Hokkaido
- Prefecture: Hokkaido
- Subprefecture: Hidaka
- District: Mitsuishi

Area
  - Total: 346.23 km^{2} (133.68 sq mi)

Population (2004)
  - Total: 4,950
  - Density: 14.3/km^{2} (37.0/sq mi)

Mitsuishi (三石町, Mitsuishi-chō) was a town located in Mitsuishi District, Hidaka Subprefecture, Hokkaido, Japan.

As of 2004, the town had an estimated population of 4,950 and a density of 14.30 persons per km^{2}. The total area was 346.23 km^{2}.

On March 31, 2006, Mitsuishi was merged with the town of Shizunai (from Shizunai District) to create the new town of Shinhidaka (in the newly created Hidaka District).

== Climate ==
Climate data for Mitsuishi (1991−2020 normals, extremes 1977−present)
Month	Jan	Feb	Mar	Apr	May	Jun	Jul	Aug	Sep	Oct	Nov	Dec	Year
Record high °C (°F)	10.7 (51.3)	10.5 (50.9)	17.3 (63.1)	22.6 (72.7)	25.8 (78.4)	28.4 (83.1)	32.1 (89.8)	32.0 (89.6)	31.2 (88.2)	23.5 (74.3)	19.9 (67.8)	14.3 (57.7)	32.1 (89.8)
Mean daily maximum °C (°F)	0.4 (32.7)	0.8 (33.4)	4.5 (40.1)	10.3 (50.5)	15.4 (59.7)	18.8 (65.8)	22.4 (72.3)	24.3 (75.7)	22.0 (71.6)	16.3 (61.3)	9.5 (49.1)	2.9 (37.2)	12.3 (54.1)
Daily mean °C (°F)	−4.6 (23.7)	−4.2 (24.4)	−0.2 (31.6)	4.7 (40.5)	10.0 (50.0)	14.2 (57.6)	18.4 (65.1)	20.0 (68.0)	16.6 (61.9)	10.1 (50.2)	4.2 (39.6)	−1.8 (28.8)	7.3 (45.1)
Mean daily minimum °C (°F)	−11.3 (11.7)	−11.2 (11.8)	−6.1 (21.0)	−1.8 (28.8)	3.7 (38.7)	9.4 (48.9)	14.8 (58.6)	16.0 (60.8)	11.0 (51.8)	3.5 (38.3)	−1.7 (28.9)	−7.5 (18.5)	1.6 (34.8)
Record low °C (°F)	−24.1 (−11.4)	−25.9 (−14.6)	−23.6 (−10.5)	−11.6 (11.1)	−5.9 (21.4)	−0.4 (31.3)	5.4 (41.7)	5.0 (41.0)	−0.8 (30.6)	−5.7 (21.7)	−12.5 (9.5)	−20.8 (−5.4)	−25.9 (−14.6)
Average precipitation mm (inches)	38.4 (1.51)	35.7 (1.41)	62.7 (2.47)	98.7 (3.89)	146.3 (5.76)	105.5 (4.15)	158.7 (6.25)	182.4 (7.18)	152.3 (6.00)	127.2 (5.01)	94.2 (3.71)	59.6 (2.35)	1,258.4 (49.54)
Average rainy days	7.4	7.2	8.1	10.8	11.0	9.0	11.3	11.5	11.3	11.9	12.6	11.1	123.2
Mean monthly sunshine hours	145.6	155.3	185.5	188.6	193.8	161.9	126.9	143.9	165.7	171.6	126.3	120.9	1,886.7
Source 1: JMA
Source 2: JMA
