= Japan Racing Association Hall of Fame =

Japanese horse racing memorial hall

Coordinates: 35°39′59″N 139°29′17″E

The Horse Racing Hall of Fame (Japanese: 競馬の殿堂) is a Japanese horse racing memorial hall which was installed on September 2, 1985 at the JRA Horse Racing Museum, Fuchu, Tokyo. It was founded by Japan Racing Association to honor the achievements of race horses, jockeys and trainers.

Race horses inducted into the Hall of Fame are called Kensho-ba (顕彰馬) while jockeys and trainer are called Kensho-sha (顕彰者) by the Japan Racing Association.

== Race horse nomination ==
The selection of a race horse for the Hall of Fame is decided annually by a vote in June. It is voted on by members of the press. Racehorses are inducted into the Hall of Fame if they gather over three-quarters of the total vote.

== Selection process ==
The current selection method involves a vote by members of the media and newspaper industry who have been involved in horse racing coverage for over 10 years. Each voter can nominate up to four horses (a "bullet voting" system is used, and "No applicable horse" is also an option). A horse is selected if it receives votes from at least three-quarters (75%) of the total voters. This system has been in place since 2015.

To be eligible, a horse must have been retired from racing (deregistered) for at least one year as of the cutoff date of March 31, but no more than 20 years. Active horses, those retired for less than a year, and those retired for more than 20 years are ineligible.

=== 1984 – 1999 ===
During this period, the Hall of Fame Selection Committee determined inductees based on the following criteria (requiring three-quarters approval from committee members):

-Exceptional Racing Record: Generally, horses that won three or more GI-rated heavy stakes races.

-Excellent Racing and Breeding Record: Horses with records similar to the above whose offspring performed exceptionally well (specifically, a sire with five or more GI-winning offspring, or a mare with two or more).

-Special Contribution to Central Horse Racing (JRA): Horses that contributed significantly to the development of JRA through international success, record-breaking achievements, popularity, or public impact.

The last horse selected under this system was Taiki Shuttle in 1999. In 1990, a re-evaluation of past horses was conducted, leading to the induction of Ten Point, Kodama, Speed Symboli, and Meiji Hikari. This was largely due to persistent criticism from fans and media regarding the omission of Ten Point (the rival of Tosho Boy, who was inducted at the start), as well as changes in the status of horses due to the success of their offspring.

Notably, horses like Dainana Hoshu, Take Hope, Green Grass, and Fujino O met the criteria but were not inducted. Dainana Hoshu, in particular, was a legendary runner of his era with 23 wins in 29 starts, including three of the "Eight Major Races." Despite being a lock for induction in 1984, he was reportedly blocked by a single committee member who argued that the horse's small stature lacked the "dignity" required of a Thoroughbred.

=== 2001 – 2003 ===
In 2001, the system shifted to the current media-based voting format. However, because there was no limit on the number of years since retirement, votes were split between veteran reporters favoring older legends like Takeshiba O and younger reporters pushing for recent stars like El Condor Pasa and Special Week.

In 2003, T.M. Opera O—despite a record-breaking career including a sweep of the Autumn Triple Crown and a world-record prize money total—failed to reach the 75% threshold. This caused a massive backlash, with fans flooding the JRA website with protests.

=== 2004 – 2014 ===
Following the T.M. Opera O controversy, the JRA revised the rules. They noted that as time passes, fewer people remember a horse's live performances and their evaluation as breeding stock becomes fixed. Consequently, eligibility was restricted to horses retired within the last 20 years. Under this method, T.M. Opera O (2004), Deep Impact (2008), and Vodka (2011) were selected.

=== 2015 – Present ===
Starting in 2015, the number of horses a voter could nominate was increased from two to four. According to the JRA, this change aimed to ensure that worthy horses were selected even as votes became fragmented due to the diversification of racing categories (sprints, dirt, etc.).

Since 2015, the following horses have been inducted: Orfevre (2015), Gentildonna (2016), Lord Kanaloa (2018), Kitasan Black (2020), Almond Eye (2023), and both Contrail, King Kamehameha (2024), Equinox (2025) and Oju Chosan (2026).

In the 2024 vote, eligibility rules were tightened, resulting in many "Associate Members" (former reporters and announcers no longer on the front lines) losing their voting rights. This led to the successful induction of Contrail (86.4%), who had missed by a single vote the previous year, and King Kamehameha (81.3%), who was entering his penultimate year of eligibility. This marked the first time multiple horses were selected in a single year under the 2015 rules.

=== Special exceptions ===
Special selection methods were implemented for JRA's 50th (2004) and 60th (2014) anniversaries: 2004: To account for the new "20-year rule," a special vote was held for horses retired before 1983. Takeshiba O was selected through this one-time process.

2014: Voters were allowed to nominate up to four horses as a one-time measure, leading to the induction of El Condor Pasa. Despite consistently leading the polls for years, he had previously failed to reach the 75% threshold until this rule change.

== Hall of Fame ==
Below data is based on data available on the JRA website.

| Horse | Foaled | Inducted | Major Win(s) | Award and Achievement(s) | Connections |
|---|---|---|---|---|---|
| Oju Chosan (JPN) オジュウチョウサン | B. H. 2011 | 2026 | 40 starts 20 wins: (Japan) Nakayama Grand Jump (2016-2020, 2022) (Japan) Nakayama Daishogai (2016, 2017, 2021) (Japan) Tokyo High Jump (2016, 2017) (Japan) Hanshin Spring Jump (2017, 2019, 2020) (Japan) Tokyo Jump Stakes (2016) | JRA Award for Best Steeplechase Horse (2016-2018, 2021, 2022) | Breeder: Bando Bokujo (JPN); Owner: Chosan Co. Ltd. (JPN); Trainer: Shoichiro Wada (JPN) |
| Equinox (JPN) イクイノックス | Br. H. 2019 | 2025 | 10 starts 8 wins: Tokyo Sports Hai Nisai Stakes (2021) (Japan) Tenno Sho (Autumn) (2022, 2023) (Japan) Arima Kinen (2022) (United Arab Emirates) Dubai Sheema Classic (2023) (Japan) Takarazuka Kinen (2023); Japan Cup (2023) | Japanese Horse of the Year (2022, 2023); JRA Award for Best Three-Year-Old Colt (2022); JRA Award for Best Older Male Horse (2023); Longines World's Best Racehorse (2023) | Breeder: Northern Farm (JPN); Owner: Silk Racing Co., Ltd. (JPN); Trainer: Tetsuya Kimura (JPN) |
| Contrail (JPN) コントレイル | Br. H. 2017 | 2024 | 11 starts 8 wins: Tokyo Sports Hai Nisai Stakes (2019) (Japan) Hopeful Stakes (2019) (Japan) Satsuki Sho (2020) (Japan) Tokyo Yushun (2020); Kobe Shimbun Hai (2020) (Japan) Kikuka Sho (2020); Japan Cup (2021) | 8th Japanese Triple Crown Champion (2020); JRA Award for Best Two-Year-Old Colt (2019); JRA Award for Best Three-Year-Old Colt (2020); JRA Award for Best Older Male Horse (2021) | Breeder: North Hills Co., Ltd. (JPN); Owner: Shinji Maeda (JPN); Trainer: Yoshito Yahagi (JPN) |
| King Kamehameha (JPN) キングカメハメハ | B. H. 2001 | 2024 | 8 starts 7 wins: (Japan) Mainichi Hai (2004) (Japan) NHK Mile Cup (2004) (Japan) Tokyo Yushun (2004) (Japan) Kobe Shimbun Hai (2004) | JRA Award for Best Three-Year-Old Colt (2004); Leading sire in Japan (2010, 2011); Leading broodmare sire in Japan (2020–2022); Leading broodmare sire in North America (2020, 2023, 2024) | Breeder: Northern Farm (JPN); Owner: Makoto Kaneko (JPN); Trainer: Kunihide Matsuda (JPN) |
| Almond Eye (JPN) アーモンドアイ | B. M. 2015 | 2023 | 15 starts 11 wins: Shinzan Kinen (2018) (Japan) Oka Sho (2018) (Japan) Yushun Himba (2018) (Japan) Shuka Sho (2018); Japan Cup (2018, 2020) (United Arab Emirates) Dubai Turf (2019) (Japan) Tenno Sho (Autumn) (2019, 2020) (Japan) Victoria Mile (2019) | 5th Japanese Triple Tiara Champion (2018); Japanese Horse of the Year (2018, 2020); JRA Award for Best Three-Year-Old Filly (2018); JRA Award for Best Older Filly or Mare (2020) | Breeder: Northern Farm (JPN); Owner: Silk Racing Co., Ltd. (JPN); Trainer: Sakae Kunieda (JPN) |
| Kitasan Black (JPN) キタサンブラック | B. H. 2012 | 2020 | 20 starts 12 wins: Spring Stakes (2015); St. Lite Kinen (2015) (Japan) Kikuka Sho (2015) (Japan) Tenno Sho (Spring) (2016, 2017); Kyoto Daishoten (2016); Japan Cup (2016) (Japan) Osaka Hai (2017) (Japan) Tenno Sho (Autumn) (2017) (Japan) Arima Kinen (2017) | Japanese Horse of the Year (2016, 2017); JRA Award for Best Older Male Horse (2016, 2017) | Breeder: Yanagawa Bokujo (JPN); Owner: Ono Shoji Co., Ltd. (JPN); Trainer: Hisashi Shimizu (JPN) |
| Lord Kanaloa (JPN) ロードカナロア | B. H. 2008 | 2018 | 19 starts 13 wins: (Japan) Keihan Hai (2011) (Japan) Silk Road Stakes (2012) (Japan) Sprinters Stakes (2012, 2013); Hong Kong Sprint (2012, 2013) (Japan) Hankyu Hai (2013) (Japan) Takamatsunomiya Kinen (2013) (Japan) Yasuda Kinen (2013) | JRA Award for Best Sprinter or Miler (2012, 2013); Japanese Horse of the Year (2013) | Breeder: K. I. Farm (JPN); Owner: Lord Horse Club Co., Ltd. (JPN); Trainer: Takayuki Yasuda (JPN) |
| Gentildonna (JPN) ジェンティルドンナ | B. M. 2009 | 2016 | 19 starts 10 wins: Shinzan Kinen (2012) (Japan) Oka Sho (2012) (Japan) Yushun Himba (2012); Rose Stakes (2012) (Japan) Shuka Sho (2012); Japan Cup (2012, 2013) (United Arab Emirates) Dubai Sheema Classic (2014) (Japan) Arima Kinen (2014) | 4th Japanese Triple Tiara Champion (2012); Japanese Horse of the Year (2012, 2014); JRA Award for Best Three-Year-Old Filly (2012); JRA Award for Best Older Filly or Mare (2013, 2014) | Breeder: Northern Farm (JPN); Owner: Sunday Racing Co., Ltd. (JPN); Trainer: Sei Ishizaka (JPN) |
| Orfevre (JPN) オルフェーヴル | Ch. H. 2008 | 2015 | 21 starts 12 wins: (Japan) Spring Stakes (2011) (Japan) Satsuki Sho (2011) (Japan) Tokyo Yushun (2011) (Japan) Kobe Shimbun Hai (2011) (Japan) Kikuka Sho (2011) (Japan) Arima Kinen (2011, 2013) (Japan) Takarazuka Kinen (2012) (France) Prix Foy (2012, 2013) (Japan) Sankei Osaka Hai (2013) | 7th Japanese Triple Crown Champion (2011); Japanese Horse of the Year (2011); JRA Award for Best Three-Year-Old Colt (2011); JRA Award for Best Older Male Horse (2012, 2013) | Breeder: Shadai Farm (JPN); Owner: Sunday Racing Co., Ltd. (JPN); Trainer: Yasutoshi Ikee (JPN) |
| El Condor Pasa (USA) エルコンドルパサー | Dk.B. H. 1995 | 2014 | 11 starts 8 wins: New Zealand Trophy (1998) (Japan) NHK Mile Cup (1998); Japan Cup (1998) (France) Grand Prix de Saint-Cloud (1999) (France) Prix Foy (1999) | JRA Award for Best Four-Year-Old Colt (1998); Japanese Horse of the Year (1999); JRA Award for Best Older Male Horse (1999) | Breeder: Takashi Watanabe (JPN); Owner: Takashi Watanabe (JPN); Trainer: Yoshitaka Ninomiya (JPN) |
| Vodka (JPN) ウオッカ | B. M. 2004 | 2011 | 26 starts 10 wins: (Japan) Hanshin Juvenile Fillies (2006); Tulip Sho (2007) (Japan) Tokyo Yushun (2007) (Japan) Yasuda Kinen (2008, 2009) (Japan) Tenno Sho (Autumn) (2008) (Japan) Victoria Mile (2009); Japan Cup (2009) | JRA Award for Best Two-Year-Old Filly (2006); JRA Special Award (2007); Japanese Horse of the Year (2008, 2009); JRA Award for Best Older Filly or Mare (2008, 2009) | Breeder: Country Bokujo (JPN); Owner: Yuzo Tanimizu (JPN); Trainer: Katsuhiko Sumii (JPN) |
| Deep Impact (JPN) ディープインパクト | B. H. 2002 | 2008 | 14 starts 12 wins: Yayoi Sho (2005) (Japan) Satsuki Sho (2005) (Japan) Tokyo Yushun (2005); Kobe Shimbun Hai (2005) (Japan) Kikuka Sho (2005); Hanshin Daishoten (2006) (Japan) Tenno Sho (Spring) (2006) (Japan) Takarazuka Kinen(2006); Japan Cup (2006) (Japan) Arima Kinen (2006) | 6th Japanese Triple Crown Champion (2005); Japanese Horse of the Year (2005, 2006); JRA Award for Best Three-Year-Old Colt (2005); JRA Award for Best Older Male Horse (2006); Leading sire in Japan (2012–2022); Leading broodmare sire in Japan (2023–2025) | Breeder: Northern Farm (JPN); Owner: Kaneko Makoto Holdings (JPN); Trainer: Yasuo Ikee (JPN) |
| T. M. Opera O (JPN) テイエムオペラオー | Ch. H. 1996 | 2004 | 26 starts 14 wins: Mainichi Hai (1999) (Japan) Satsuki Sho (1999); Kyoto Kinen (2000); Hanshin Daishoten (2000) (Japan) Tenno Sho (Spring) (2000, 2001) (Japan) Takarazuka Kinen (2000); Kyoto Daishoten (2000, 2001) (Japan) Tenno Sho (Autumn) (2000); Japan Cup (2000) (Japan) Arima Kinen (2000) | JRA Award for Best Four-Year-Old Colt (1999); Japanese Horse of the Year (2000); JRA Award for Best Older Male Horse (2001) | Breeder: Kineusu Bokujo (JPN); Owner: Masatsugu Takezono (JPN); Trainer: Ichizo Iwamoto (JPN) |
| Takeshiba O (JPN) タケシバオー | B. H. 1965 | 2004 | 29 starts 16 wins: (Japan) Asahi Hai Sansai Stakes (1967) (Japan) Tokyo Yonsai Stakes (1968) (Japan) Tokyo Shimbun Hai (1969) (Japan) Kyoto Kinen (Spring) (1969) (Japan) Tenno Sho (Spring) (1969) (Japan) Mainichi Okan (1969) (Japan) British Fair Kaisai Kinen (1969) | Keishusha Award for Best Three-Year-Old Colt (1967); Japanese Horse of the Year (1969); Keishusha Award for Best Older Male Horse (1969) | Breeder: Kenji Sakaki (JPN); Owner: Masao Obara (JPN); Trainer: Hiroo Harada (JPN) |
| Taiki Shuttle (USA) タイキシャトル | Ch. H. 1994 | 1999 | 13 starts 11 wins: (Japan) Unicorn Stakes (1997) (Japan) Swan Stakes (1997) (Japan) Mile Championship (1997, 1998) (Japan) Sprinters Stakes (1997) (Japan) Keio Hai Spring Cup (1998) (Japan) Yasuda Kinen (1998) (France) Prix Jacques Le Marois (1998) | JRA Award for Best Sprinter or Miler (1997, 1998); Japanese Horse of the Year (1998); JRA Award for Best Older Male Horse (1998) | Breeder: Taiki Farm (JPN); Owner: Taiki Farm Co., Ltd. (JPN); Trainer: Kazuo Fujisawa (JPN) |
| Narita Brian (JPN) ナリタブライアン | Dk.B. H. 1991 | 1997 | 21 starts 12 wins: (Japan) Asahi Hai Sansai Stakes (1993) (Japan) Kyodo Tsushin Hai Yonsai Stakes (1994) (Japan) Spring Stakes (1994) (Japan) Satsuki Sho (1994) (Japan) Tokyo Yushun (1994) (Japan) Kikuka Sho (1994) (Japan) Arima Kinen (1994) (Japan) Hanshin Daishoten (1995, 1996) | 5th Japanese Triple Crown Champion (1994); JRA Award for Best Three-Year-Old Colt (1993); Japanese Horse of the Year (1994); JRA Award for Best Four-Year-Old Colt (1994) | Breeder: Hayata Bokujo (JPN); Owner: Hidenori Yamaji (JPN); Trainer: Masaaki Okubo (JPN) |
| Tokai Teio (JPN) トウカイテイオー | B. H. 1988 | 1995 | 12 starts 9 wins: (Japan) Satsuki Sho (1991) (Japan) Tokyo Yushun (1991); Sankei Osaka Hai (1992); Japan Cup (1992) (Japan) Arima Kinen (1993) | Japanese Horse of the Year (1991); JRA Award for Best Four-Year-Old Colt (1991); JRA Award for Best Horse by Domestic Sire (1991); JRA Special Award (1993) | Breeder: Nagahama Bokujo (JPN); Owner: Masanori Uchimura (JPN); Trainer: Shouichi Matsumoto (JPN) |
| Mejiro McQueen (JPN) メジロマックイーン | Gr. H. 1987 | 1994 | 21 starts 12 wins: (Japan) Kikuka Sho (1990) (Japan) Hanshin Daishoten (1991, 1992) (Japan) Tenno Sho (Spring) (1991, 1992) (Japan) Kyoto Daishoten (1991, 1993) (Japan) Sankei Osaka Hai (1993) (Japan) Takarazuka Kinen (1993) | JRA Award for Best Older Male Horse (1991) | Breeder: Mejiro Bokujo (JPN); Owner: Mejiro Shouji Co., Ltd. (JPN); Trainer: Yasuo Ikee (JPN) |
| Oguri Cap (JPN) オグリキャップ | Gr. H. 1985 | 1991 | 32 starts 22 wins: (Japan) Pegasus Stakes (1988) (Japan) Mainichi Hai (1988) (Japan) Kyoto Yonsai Tokubetsu (1988) (Japan) New Zealand Trophy (1988) (Japan) Takamatsunomiya Hai (1988) (Japan) Mainichi Okan (1988, 1989) (Japan) Arima Kinen (1988, 1990) (Japan) Sankei Sho All Comers (1989) (Japan) Mile Championship (1989) (Japan) Yasuda Kinen (1990) | JRA Award for Best Four-Year-Old Colt (1988); JRA Special Award (1989); Japanese Horse of the Year (1990); JRA Award for Best Older Male Horse (1990) | Breeder: Inaba Bokujo (JPN); Owner: Oguri Koichi (JPN) → Isoo Sahashii (JPN) → Toshinori Kondo (JPN); Trainer: Masao Sumi (JPN) → Tsutomu Setoguchi (JPN) |
| Maruzensky (JPN) マルゼンスキー | B. H. 1974 | 1990 | 8 starts 8 wins: (Japan) Fuchu Sansai Stakes (1976) (Japan) Asahi Hai Sansai Stakes (1976) (Japan) Nippon Tampa Sho (1977) | Yushun Award for Best Three-Year-Old Colt (1976) | Breeder: Hashimoto Bokujo (JPN); Owner: Zenkichi Hashimoto (JPN); Trainer: Shigehiko Hongo (JPN) |
| Ten Point (JPN) テンポイント | Ch. H. 1973 | 1990 | 18 starts 11 wins: (Japan) Hanshin Sansai Stakes (1975) (Japan) Tokyo Yonsai Stakes (1976) (Japan) Spring Stakes (1976) (Japan) Kyoto Kinen (Spring) (1977) (Japan) Naruo Kinen (1977) (Japan) Tenno Sho (Spring) (1977) (Japan) Kyoto Daishoten (1977) (Japan) Arima Kinen (1977) | Yushun Award for Best Three-Year-Old Colt (1975); Japanese Horse of the Year (1977); Yushun Award for Best Older Male Horse (1977); Yushun MassComm Award (1978) | Breeder: Yoshida Bokujo (JPN); Owner: Hisanari Takada (JPN); Trainer: Sasuke Ogawa (JPN) |
| Speed Symboli (JPN) スピードシンボリ | Dk.B. H. 1963 | 1990 | 43 starts 17 wins: (Japan) Keisei Hai (1966) (Japan) American Jockey Club Cup (1967, 1970) (Japan) Meguro Kinen (Spring) (1967, 1969) (Japan) Tenno Sho (Spring) (1967) (Japan) Nippon Keizai Sho (1967) (Japan) Argentine Jockey Club Cup (1968) (Japan) Diamond Stakes (1969) (Japan) Arima Kinen (1969, 1970) (Japan) Takarazuka Kinen (1970) | Japanese Horse of the Year (1967, 1970); Keishusha Award for Best Older Male Horse (1967, 1970) | Breeder: Symboli Bokujo (JPN); Owner: Tomohiro Wada (JPN); Trainer: Tomihisa Nohira (JPN) → Shozo Nohira (JPN) |
| Kodama (JPN) コダマ | Ch. H. 1957 | 1990 | 17 starts 12 wins: (Japan) Hanshin Sansai Stakes (1959) (Japan) Spring Stakes (1960) (Japan) Satsuki Sho (1960) (Japan) Tokyo Yushun (1960) (Japan) Osaka Hai (1961) (Japan) Swan Stakes (1961) (Japan) Takarazuka Kinen (1962) | Japanese Horse of the Year (1960); Keishusha Award for Best Four-Year-Old Colt (1960) | Breeder: Kamata Bokujo (JPN); Owner: Yoshigoro Ito (JPN); Trainer: Bungo Takeda (JPN) |
| Meiji Hikari (JPN) メイヂヒカリ | B. H. 1952 | 1990 | 21 starts 16 wins: (Japan) Asahi Hai Sansai Stakes (1954) (Japan) Sankei Sho All Comers (1955) (Japan) Kikuka Sho (1955) (Japan) Tenno Sho (Spring) (1956) (Japan) Nakayama Grand Prix (1956) | Keishusha Award for Best Three-Year-Old Colt (1954); Keishusha Award for Best Four-Year-Old Colt (1955); Japanese Horse of the Year (1956); Keishusha Award for Best Older Male Horse (1956) | Breeder: Otsuka Bokujo (JPN); Owner: Shinsaku Nitta (JPN) → Matsue Nitta (JPN); Trainer: Tomiyoshi Fujimoto (JPN) |
| Mejiro Ramonu (JPN) メジロラモーヌ | Br. M. 1983 | 1987 | 12 starts 9 wins: (Japan) TV Tokyo Sho Sansai Himba Stakes (1985) (Japan) Yonsai Himba Tokubetsu (West) (1986) (Japan) Oka Sho (1986) (Japan) Yonsai Himba Tokubetsu (East) (1986) (Japan) Yushun Himba (1986) (Japan) Rose Stakes (1986) (Japan) Queen Elizabeth II Commemorative Cup (1986) | 1st Japanese Triple Tiara Champion (1986); Yushun Award for Best Three-Year-Old Filly (1985); Yushun Award for Best Four-Year-Old Filly (1986) | Breeder: Mejiro Bokujo (JPN); Owner: Mejiro Bokujo Co., Ltd. (JPN); Trainer: Shinji Okuhira (JPN) |
| Symboli Rudolf (JPN) シンボリルドルフ | B. H. 1981 | 1987 | 16 starts 13 wins: Yayoi Sho (1984) (Japan) Satsuki Sho (1984) (Japan) Tokyo Yushun (1984); St. Lite Kinen (1984) (Japan) Kikuka Sho (1984) (Japan) Arima Kinen (1984, 1985); Nikkei Sho (1985) (Japan) Tenno Sho (Spring) (1985); Japan Cup (1985) | 4th Japanese Triple Crown Champion (1984); Japanese Horse of the Year (1984, 1985); Yushun Award for Best Four-Year-Old Colt (1984); Yushun Award for Best Older Male Horse (1985) | Breeder: Symboli Bokujo (JPN); Owner: Symboli Bokujo Co., Ltd. (JPN); Trainer: Yuji Nohira (JPN) |
| Mr. C. B. (JPN) ミスターシービー | Dk.B. H. 1980 | 1986 | 15 starts 8 wins: (Japan) Kyodo Tsushin Hai Yonsai Stakes (1983) (Japan) Yayoi Sho (1983) (Japan) Satsuki Sho (1983) (Japan) Tokyo Yushun (1983) (Japan) Kikuka Sho (1983) (Japan) Tenno Sho (Autumn) (1984) | 3rd Japanese Triple Crown Champion (1983); Japanese Horse of the Year (1983); Yushun Award for Best Four-Year-Old Colt (1983) | Breeder: Chigira Bokujo (JPN); Owner: Chigira Bokujo Co., Ltd. (JPN); Trainer: Yasuhisa Matsuyama (JPN) |
| Grand Marchs (JPN) グランドマーチス | Ch. H. 1969 | 1985 | 63 starts 23 wins: (Japan) Nakayama Daishogai (Spring) (1974, 1975) (Japan) Nakayama Daishogai (Autumn) (1974, 1975) (Japan) Kyoto Daishogai (Autumn) (1974, 1975) (Japan) Kyoto Daishogai (Spring) (1975) | Yushun Award for Best Steeplechase Horse (1974, 1975) | Breeder: Chuo Bokujo (JPN); Owner: Okubo Kosan Co., Ltd. (JPN); Trainer: Shoji Ito (JPN) |
| Seiyu (JPN) セイユウ | B. H. 1954 | 1985 | 49 starts 26 wins: (Japan) Yomiuri Cup (Spring) (1957) (Japan) Tanabata Sho (1957) (Japan) Fukushima Kinen (1957) (Japan) St. Lite Kinen (1957) (Japan) Yomiuri Cup (Autumn) (1957) | Keishusha Award for Best Arabian Horse (1956, 1957) | Breeder: Hidaka Shuchiku Bokujo (JPN); Owner: Toru Kono (JPN); Trainer: Hideo Inaba (JPN) |
| Tosho Boy (JPN) トウショウボーイ | B. H. 1973 | 1984 | 15 starts 10 wins: (Japan) Satsuki Sho (1976) (Japan) Kobe Shimbun Hai (1976) (Japan) Kyoto Shimbun Hai (1976) (Japan) Arima Kinen (1976) (Japan) Takarazuka Kinen (1977) (Japan) Takamatsunomiya Hai (1977) | Japanese Horse of the Year (1976); Yushun Award for Best Four-Year-Old Colt (1976) | Breeder: Tosho Bokujo (JPN); Owner: Tosho Sangyo Co., Ltd. (JPN); Trainer: Takayoshi Yasuda (JPN) |
| Haiseiko (JPN) ハイセイコー | B. H. 1970 | 1984 | 22 starts 13 wins: (Japan) Seiun Sho (1972) (Japan) Yayoi Sho (1973) (Japan) Spring Stakes (1973) (Japan) Satsuki Sho (1973) (Japan) NHK Hai (1973) (Japan) Nakayama Kinen (1974) (Japan) Takarazuka Kinen (1974) (Japan) Takamatsunomiya Hai (1974) | Yushun Public Award (1973) | Breeder: Takeda Bokujo (JPN); Owner: Oyu Co., Ltd. (JPN) → Horseman Club (JPN); Trainer: Masami Ito (JPN) → Katsutaro Suzuki (JPN) |
| Shinzan (JPN) シンザン | B. H. 1961 | 1984 | 19 starts 15 wins: (Japan) Spring Stakes (1964) (Japan) Satsuki Sho (1964) (Japan) Tokyo Yushun (1964) (Japan) Kikuka Sho (1964) (Japan) Takarazuka Kinen (1965) (Japan) Meguro Kinen (Autumn) (1965) (Japan) Tenno Sho (Autumn) (1965) (Japan) Arima Kinen (1965) | 2nd Japanese Triple Crown Champion (1964); Japanese Horse of the Year (1964, 1965); Keishusha Award for Best Four-Year-Old Colt (1964); Keishusha Award for Best Older Male Horse (1965) | Breeder: Yoshimatsu Matsuhashi (JPN); Owner: Kokichi Hashimoto (JPN); Trainer: Bungo Takeda (JPN) |
| Haku Chikara (JPN) ハクチカラ | Ch. H. 1953 | 1984 | 49 starts 21 wins: (Japan) Tokyo Yushun (1956) (Japan) Kabutoyama Kinen (1956) (Japan) Meguro Kinen (Spring) (1957) (Japan) Tokyo Hai (1957) (Japan) Nippon Keizai Sho (1957) (Japan) Mainichi Okan (1957) (Japan) Meguro Kinen (Autumn) (1957) (Japan) Tenno Sho (Autumn) (1957) (Japan) Arima Kinen (1957) (United States) Washington's Birthday Handicap (1959) | Japanese Horse of the Year (1957); Keishusha Award for Best Older Male Horse (1957) | Breeder: Yashima Bokujo (JPN); Owner: Hiroshi Nishi (JPN); Trainer: Tokichi Ogata (JPN) |
| Tokino Minoru (JPN) トキノミノル | B. H. 1948 | 1984 | 10 starts 10 wins: (Japan) Asahi Hai Sansai Stakes (1950) (Japan) Satsuki Sho (1951) (Japan) Tokyo Yushun (1951) | | Breeder: Honkiri Bokujo (JPN); Owner: Masaichi Nagata (JPN); Trainer: Waichiro Tanaka (JPN) |
| Tosa Midori (JPN) トサミドリ | B. H. 1946 | 1984 | 31 starts 21 wins: (Japan) Satsuki Sho (1949) (Japan) Kikuka Sho (1949) (Japan) St. Lite Kinen (1949) (Japan) Kimpai (1950) (Japan) Sapporo Kinen (1950) (Japan) Tokyo Hai (1951) | Leading broodmare sire in Japan (1977); Sire of seven Eight Major Races winners | Breeder: Morita Bokujo (JPN); Owner: Kenjiro Saito (JPN); Trainer: Yoichiro Mochizuki (JPN) → Torai Hieda (JPN) |
| Tokitsukaze (JPN) トキツカゼ | B. M. 1944 | 1984 | 30 starts 11 wins: (Japan) Norinsho Shoten (1947) (Japan) Yushun Himba (1947) (Japan) Kabutoyama Kinen (1947) (Japan) Norin Daijin Sho (1948) | Dam of two Japanese Horse of the Year winners: (Japan) Otokitsu (1955) (Japan) Onward There (1958) | Breeder: Masuda Bokujo (JPN); Owner: Washitaro Kawaguchi (JPN); Trainer: Fusamatsu Okubo (JPN) |
| Kurifuji (JPN) クリフジ | Ch. M. 1940 | 1984 | 11 starts 11 wins: (Japan) Tokyo Yushun Kyoso (1943) (Japan) Hanshin Yushun Himba (1943) (Japan) Kyoto Noshosho Shoten Yonsai Yobiuma (1943) (Japan) Yokohama Kinen (Spring) (1944) | | Breeder: Shimofusa Goryo Bokujo (JPN); Owner: Tomochi Kuribayashi (JPN); Trainer: Tokichi Ogata (JPN) |
| St. Lite (JPN) セントライト | Dk.B. H. 1938 | 1984 | 12 starts 9 wins: (Japan) Yokohama Noshosho Shoten Yonsai Yobiuma (1941) (Japan) Tokyo Yushun Kyoso (1941) (Japan) Yokohama Noshosho Shoten Yon-Gosai Yobiuma (1941) (Japan) Kyoto Noshosho Shoten Yonsai Yobiuma (1941) | 1st Japanese Triple Crown Champion (1941) | Breeder: Koiwai Nojo (JPN); Owner: Yusaku Kato (JPN); Trainer: Waichiro Tanaka (JPN) |
| Kumohata (JPN) クモハタ | Ch. H. 1936 | 1984 | 21 starts 9 wins: (Japan) Tokyo Yushun Kyoso (1939) | Leading sire in Japan (1952–1957); Leading broodmare sire in Japan (1964) | Breeder: Shimofusa Goryo Bokujo (JPN); Owner: Yusaku Kato (JPN); Trainer: Waichiro Tanaka (JPN) |

=== Criticism against the voting process ===
The voting process for race horse selection has been called in to question, including by some voters, in 2022 after no horses gained the required votes to be inducted in to the Hall of Fame, including Almond Eye despite winning 9 Grade 1 races in her career. While Almond Eye was ultimately inducted in 2023, during that same voting process Contrail was not selected by 1 less vote, and at least 3 votes were cast to Stay Gold, who was already ineligible due to the retirement rules; leading to more criticism against the voting process.

== Jockeys ==
The jockeys who have shown remarkable activity as well as more than 1000 victories are inducted to hall of Fame. The selection was started in 2004.

- Masayoshi Ebina (蛯名正義 2026)
- Yuichi Fukunaga (福永洋一 2004)
- Hiroyuki Gohara (郷原洋行 2014)
- Hiroshi Kawachi (河内洋 2014)
- Yuuji Nohira (野平祐二 2004)
- Yukio Okabe (岡部幸雄 2014)
- Masato Shibata (柴田政人 2014)
- Takayoshi Yasuda (保田隆芳 2004)

== Trainers ==
Trainers who have won more than 1000 races and who have won more than ten times at the eight biggest races: Tokyo Yushun (Japanese Derby), Satsuki Sho (Japanese 2000 Guineas), Kikuka Sho (Japanese St. Leger), Yushun Himba (Japanese Oaks), Oka Sho (Japanese 1000 Guineas), Tenno Sho (Spring and Autumn) and Arima Kinen, are inducted to hall of Fame. The selection was started in 2004.

- Tomiyoshi Fujimoto (藤本冨良, 2004)
- Kazuo Fujisawa (藤沢和雄, 2022)
- Kojiro Hashiguchi (橋口弘次郎, 2016)
- Yukio Inaba (稲葉幸夫, 2004)
- Yuji Ito (伊藤雄二, 2014)
- Kinzou Kubota (久保田金造, 2004)
- Sakae Kunieda (国枝栄, 2026)
- Kichisaburou Matsuyama (松山吉三郎, 2004)
- Yasuhisa Matsuyama (松山康久, 2014)
- Hashiguchi Koujirou (橋口弘次郎, 2013)
- Toshio Nihonyanagi (二本柳俊夫, 2004)
- Tokichi Ogata (尾形藤吉, 2004)
- Hidetaka Otonashi (音無秀孝, 2025)
- Bungo Takeda (武田文吾, 2004)

== See also ==
- Australian Racing Hall of Fame
- Canadian Horse Racing Hall of Fame
- New Zealand Racing Hall of Fame
- United States National Museum of Racing and Hall of Fame
