= Tosho Boy =

Japanese-bred Thoroughbred racehorse

Tosho Boy トウショウボーイ
- Tosho Boy at the 1976 Satsuki Sho.
- Breed: Thoroughbred
- Sire: Tesco Boy
- Grandsire: Princely Gift
- Dam: Social Butterfly
- Damsire: Your Host
- Sex: Stallion
- Foaled: 15 April 1973
- Died: 18 September 1992 (aged 19)
- Country: Japan
- Colour: Bay
- Breeder: Fujimasa Farm
- Owner: Tosho Sangyo Co., Ltd.
- Racing colours
- Trainer: Takayoshi Yasuda
- Record: 15: 10-3-1
- Earnings: 280,774,800 yen

Major wins
- Arima Kinen (1976); Kyoto Shimbun Hai (1976); Kobe Shimbun Hai (1976); Takarazuka Kinen (1977); Takamatsunomiya Hai (1977); Japanese Classic Race wins: Satsuki Shō (1976)

Awards
- Japanese Champion Three-Year-Old Colt (1976); Japanese Horse of the Year (1976)

Honours
- JRA Hall of Fame (inducted 1984)
- Last updated on September 22, 2025

Tosho Boy (Japanese: トウショウボーイ, Hepburn: Tōshō Bōi; 15 April 1973 – 18 September 1992) was a Japanese thoroughbred racehorse and stallion. Tosho Boy was successful as a racehorse, winning 10 of his 15 starts, including some of Japan's most significant horse races, such as the Satsuki Shō, Arima Kinen, and Takarazuka Kinen. Tosho Boy was part of a rivalry called "TTG" between himself, Ten Point, and Green Grass. Tosho Boy was voted both Japanese Horse of the Year and best three-year-old colt in 1976 for his racing successes. After retiring from racing, Tosho Boy was also a significant sire, producing numerous major stakes winners, including Japanese Triple Crown winner Mr. C. B. With his success as both a racer and a stallion, Tosho Boy was elected to the JRA Hall of Fame in 1984.

== Background ==
Tosho Boy was foaled on 15 April 1973 at Fujimasa Farm in Shizunai, Hokkaido. Tosho Boy's sire was Tesco Boy, a British horse who had most notably won the Queen Anne Stakes in 1966 before being transported to Japan, where he became a leading sire in the 1970s. His dam was an American horse, Social Butterfly, who was a daughter of another successful racehorse, Your Host. Tosho Boy appeared strong even from a young age, and ranch hands at Fujimasa Farm stated they believed that he could win at least one or two of the classic races.

During his two-year-old year, Tosho Boy was entered in to the stables of trainer Takayoshi Yasuda to begin race training. He was physically well developed, but Yasuda was concerned about the condition of Tosho Boy's waist area, feeling this would need to develop further before Tosho Boy could begin racing. As such, Tosho Boy did not race as a two-year-old. By December, Yasuda was satisfied with Tosho Boy's racing form, and entered the horse in to his first race, scheduled for the end of January 1976.

== Racing career ==
=== Three-year-old season ===
Tosho Boy's first race was a maiden race at Tokyo Racecourse on the 31 January 1976. Tosho Boy was the favorite entering the race, and lived up to expectations by leading almost the entirely race and taking victory. The race was sometimes referred to as the "legendary maiden race", as the race also featured Tosho Boy's future rival Green Grass and also C.B. Queen, who would later be the dam of Mr. C. B.

Tosho Boy's next races were the Tsukushi Sho in February and the Renge Sho in March, both of which he won with commanding margins of 4-5 lengths. Tosho Boy had become one of the favorites to win the Triple Crown races. The favorite as the classic races approached, however, was Ten Point, who had won in all five of his starts to that point, including already having a major win in the Hanshin Sansai Stakes. In his last races before the classics, Ten Point one, but only by narrow margins, leading some rivals to claim that he was not unbeatable.

Tosho Boy's next race was to be the Satsuki Shō, where he would race against Ten Point for the first time. The race was scheduled for its traditional slot in April at Nakayama Racecourse, but a labor dispute broke out between the Nakayama stable-worker's union and the trainer's association. The union went on strike three days before the scheduled date of the Satsuki Shō, forcing the race to both be delayed to the following week and to be run at Tokyo Racecourse. The delay caused some disruption to both Tosho Boy's and Ten Point's training schedules, but both arrived at Tokyo Racecourse in good shape. On race day, Ten Point was considered the favorite to win, while Tosho Boy was second favorite. In the race, Tosho Boy broke out from the field entering the straight and was uncontested for the run to the finish, ultimately winning by five lengths over Ten Point. With a time of 2:01.1, Tosho Boy set a new race record, surpassing the record set by Kitano Kachidoki in 1974. After Tosho Boy's dominating victory, media outlets quickly began to a potential Triple Crown winner.

Tosho Boy's next race was the Tōkyō Yūshun, where he entered as the favorite. In the race, Tosho Boy led much of the way, but in the final straight was challenged by Climb Kaiser. Tosho Boy was startled, possibly from contact from Climb Kaiser's jockey Takemi Kaga's whip, and fell fourth lengths back at 200 meters to go. He recovered, but too late to catch back up, and finished second by 2 1/2 lengths. Kaga was investigated post-race for potentially obstructing Tosho Boy, but was cleared and Climb Kaiser retained the win. Tosho Boy was rested for roughly a month after the race before being entered in to the Sapporo Kinen. He finished second again. In response, Tosho Boy's owner fired jockey Masahiro Ikegami, and for the fall races hired Yoichi Fukunaga.

Tosho Boy ran the Kobe Shimbun Hai in fall in preparation for the Kikuka-shō. He took victory in the Kobe Shimbun Hai, and entered the Kikuka-shō as the favorite, although there were some doubts about his ability to race the 3000 meter distance. On race day, the track was wet from rain the night before, which cause Tosho Boy to struggle. Tosho Boy took the lead early in the final straight, but was passed almost immediately by Green Grass and Ten Point. Tosho Boy would finish third, five lengths behind winner Green Grass. After the race, jockey Yoichi Fukunaga stated that he believed Tosho Boy may have already reached his peak as a racehorse at the Kobe Shimbun Hai and was now in decline. One month later, Tosho Boy was entered in to the Arima Kinen. Fukunaga had already committed to riding a different horse for this race, and so Kunihiko Take was hired to ride Tosho Boy. Despite the recent losses, Tosho Boy was once again the favorite to win. In the race, Tosho Boy held a good position for the entire race and took victory over Ten Point. The result marked the first time in the history of the Arima Kinen that 3-year-old horses took first and second. With a time of 2:34.0, Tosho Boy set a new record for fastest 2500 meter race in Japan.

At the end of the year, Tosho Boy was selected as both Japanese Horse of the Year and as the best three-year-old colt.

=== Four-year-old season ===
Injuries prevented Tosho Boy from racing for much of the first half of 1977. The heavy race load at the end of 1976 caused fatigue injuries, and he was forced to rest. Once recovered, training began in preparation to race the Spring Tenno Sho, but a shoulder injury forced him to miss more time. At one point, he was scheduled to race against the undefeated Maruzensky in a shorter race at Sapporo Racecourse, but continued leg injuries prevented his entry in to this race as well.

Tosho Boy made his racing return at the Takarazuka Kinen at the beginning on June. Having not raced in over five months, he was only the second favorite, and some observers described his pre-race form as poor. These concerns over Tosho Boys' form were dispelled during the race. Tosho Boy ran the last 1000 meters in 57.6 seconds – the fastest 1000 meters in Japan at that point – and beat his rival Ten Point by 3/4 lengths. His next race was the Takamatsunomiya Hai three weeks later, where he won again despite poor track conditions. During the summer, he was rested and did not race again until October. He returned at an open race at Nakayama Racecourse to prepare for the Autumn Tenno Sho - Tosho Boy won by seven lengths.

Tosho Boy was next entered in to the Autumn Tenno Sho. Expectations were high and he was the favorite entering the race again. This race, however, went poorly. Tosho Boy was unable to keep up on the final straight, and fell to seventh at the finish. After the race, Tosho Boy's owner announced that the Arima Kinen would be his final race before he would be retired to stud. The Arima Kinen was initially set to be a showdown between Tosho Boy, Ten Point, and Maruzensky, but Maruzensky was forced to withdraw due to leg injuries. Ten Point entered as the favorite, having had a strong 1977 season that would lead to him being voted Japanese Horse of the Year. Tosho Boy was second favorite. In the race, Tosho Boy led for much of the distance, but with 200 meters remaining was passed by Ten Point. Tosho Boy began to catch up again at 100 meters remaining, but ran out of time and finished by 3/4 lengths. At the time, the battle between Ten Point and Tosho Boy in this race was regarded as one of the greatest races in the history of Japanese horse racing.

As planned, the Arima Kinen was Tosho Boy's final race, and a retirement ceremony was held on 8 January 1978 at Tokyo Racecourse.

=== Racing record ===
Tosho Boy competed in 15 career races, winning 10.

Date	Race	Distance	Surface	Track	Finish	Field	1st Place (2nd Place)
31 Jan 1976	Three Year Old	1400m	Turf	Tokyo	1	18	(Royal Seikan)
22 Feb 1976	Tsukushi Sho	1400m	Dirt	Tokyo	1	12	(Hoyo Silver)
20 Mar 1976	Renge Sho	1800m	Turf	Nakayama	1	8	(Keishu Ford)
25 Apr 1976	Satsuki Shō	2000m	Turf	Tokyo	1	15	(Ten Point)
30 May 1976	Tōkyō Yūshun	2400m	Turf	Tokyo	2	27	Climb Kaiser
11 Jul 1976	Sapporo Kinen	2000m	Dirt	Sapporo	2	10	Great Seikan
3 Oct 1976	Kobe Shimbun Hai	2000m	Turf	Hanshin	1	9	(Climb Kaiser)
24 Oct 1976	Kyoto Shimbun Hai	2000m	Turf	Hanshin	1	8	(Climb Kaiser)
14 Nov 1976	Kikuka-shō	3000m	Turf	Kyoto	3	21	Green Grass
19 Dec 1976	Arima Kinen	2500m	Turf	Nakayama	1	14	(Ten Point)
5 Jun 1977	Takarazuka Kinen	2200m	Turf	Hanshin	1	6	(Ten Point)
26 Jun 1977	Takamatsunomiya Hai	2000m	Turf	Chukyo	1	9	(Center Good)
23 Oct 1977	Open	1600m	Turf	Nakayama	1	6	(Kane Kofuji)
27 Nov 1977	Tenno Sho (Autumn)	3200m	Turf	Tokyo	7	12	Hokuto Boy
18 Dec 1977	Arima Kinen	2500m	Turf	Nakayama	2	8	Ten Point

== Stud career ==
Tosho Boy was retired to stud at Hidaka Light Stallion Agricultural Cooperative's Urakawa Stud Farm in Hidaka, Hokkaido. The purchase of Tosho Boy for breeding came at a high price of ¥250 million, with his owner retaining Tosho Boy's seed stock for three years and permanent breeding rights to three horses a year.

Initially, Tosho Boy's popularity as a sire was limited, and he was mated with mares with less desirable pedigrees. This changed in 1982, when Tohso Boy's son Daizen King won the Hanshin 3-year-old Stakes and was named best two-year-old colt. The same year, Tosho Boy was named the leading sire in Japan. The following year, another of Tosho Boy's sons, Mr. C. B., became the first horse to win the Japanese Triple Crown in 19 years. In 1984, Tosho Boy was entered in to the JRA Hall of Fame. After these successes, Tosho Boy became a popular sire throughout the 1980s and in to the early 1990s, producing numerous graded stakes winners. He was referred to as "Help Boy" by smaller breeding farms, as they claimed that a single horse sired by Tosho Boy could pay off a farm's entire debt. Due in part to his success, a previously held notion that Japanese domestic horses were inferior as sires to foreign-born sires was gradually dispelled, and the popularity of having other successful Japanese racing horses increased.

=== Notable progeny ===
Tosho Boy's major stakes winners include:

c = colt, f = filly, g = gelding; horses in bold won at least one Grade 1 event.

**Foaled**	**Name**	**Sex**	**Major Wins**
1979	Lovely Star	f	1983 Kitakyushu Kinen, Kinko Sho
1980	**Daizen King**	c	1982 Hanshin Sansai Stakes
1980	**Mr. C. B.**	c	1983 Japanese Triple Crown (Satsuki Shō, Tōkyō Yūshun, Kikuka-shō), Yayoi Sho, Kyodo Tsushin Hai, 1984 Tenno Sho (Autumn)
1981	Dominus Rose	f	1986 Kyoto Himba Stakes
1981	Kikuno Pegasus	f	1984 Aichi Hai, Hanshin Himba Stakes, 1985 Chunichi Shimbun Hai
1982	Lucky Okame	f	1986 Kitakyushu Kinen
1982	Nihon Pillow Vicky	f	1984 Radio Tampa Hai Sansai Himba Stakes
1983	Knockout	c	1987 Kinko Sho
1983	Windstoss	c	1987 Chunichi Shimbun Hai, Hakodate Kinen, Lord Derby Challenge Trophy, 1988 Lord Derby Challenge Trophy
1984	Daigo Alpha	c	1987 Mainichi Hai
1984	Dokanjo	f	1986 Radio Tampa Hai Sansai Himba Stakes, 1990 Chunichi Shimbun Hai
1985	**Ara Kotoku**	f	1988 Oka Sho, Flora Stakes
1985	Mogami Champion	c	1989 Kabutoyama Kinen
1985	**Passing Shot**	f	1990 CBC Sho, Mile Championship
1985	Samantha Tosho	f	1990 Epsom Cup
1985	Tosho Arrow	f	1989 Chunichi Shimbun Hai
1985	Yaeno Dia	c	1988 Kobe Shimbun Hai
1986	**Sakura Hokuto O**	c	1988 Asahi Hai Futurity Stakes, 1989 St Lite Kinen, 1990 American Jockey Club Cup
1986	Yamano Tampopo	f	1990 Lord Derby Challenge Trophy
1987	**Daiichi Ruby**	f	1991 Kyoto Himba Stakes, Keio Hai Spring Cup, Yasuda Kinen, Sprinters Stakes
1988	**Sister Tosho**	f	1991 Oka Sho
1989	Cheers Atom	c	1994 February Stakes
1989	Sekitei Ryu O	c	1993 Nakayama Kimpai, 1994 Tokyo Shimbun Hai
1991	Bodyguard	c	1993 Daily Hai Nisai Stakes, 1995 Hankyu Hai
1992	Tosho Phenoma	c	1994 Niigata Sansai Stakes
1993	Tosho Orion	c	1998 Kitakyushu Kinen

Tosho Boy has also had some success as a broodmare sire, with many of his children also producing graded stakes winners. Most notably, Tosho Boy is the damsire of 1995 Oka Sho winner Wonder Perfume, 1997 Kikuka-shō winner Matikanefukukitaru, and 2006 Singapore Airlines International Cup winner Cosmo Bulk.

== Death ==
In early August 1992, Tosho Boy began showing signs of pain in his legs. After an inspection by veterinarians, it was found that he had developed laminitis. Despite treatment efforts, the disease worsened quickly, and on 18 September 1992, Tosho Boy was euthanized at the age of 19. His remains were divided for memorials to be constructed at both the Urakawa Stud Farm and at the Fujimasa Farm (now known as Tosho Farm) where he was born.

== Pedigree ==
Pedigree of Tosho Boy (JPN), Bay, 1973
Sire Tesco Boy (GBR) 1963	Princely Gift (GBR); 1951	Nasrullah (GBR); 1940	Nearco (ITA); 1935
Sire Tesco Boy (GBR) 1963	Princely Gift (GBR); 1951	Nasrullah (GBR); 1940	Mumtaz Begum (FRA); 1932
Sire Tesco Boy (GBR) 1963	Princely Gift (GBR); 1951	Blue Gem (GBR); 1943	Blue Peter (GBR); 1936
Sire Tesco Boy (GBR) 1963	Princely Gift (GBR); 1951	Blue Gem (GBR); 1943	Sparkle (GBR); 1935
Sire Tesco Boy (GBR) 1963	Suncourt (GBR); 1952	Hyperion (GBR); 1930	Gainsborough (GBR); 1915
Sire Tesco Boy (GBR) 1963	Suncourt (GBR); 1952	Hyperion (GBR); 1930	Selene (GBR); 1919
Sire Tesco Boy (GBR) 1963	Suncourt (GBR); 1952	Inquisition (GBR); 1936	Dastur (GBR); 1929
Sire Tesco Boy (GBR) 1963	Suncourt (GBR); 1952	Inquisition (GBR); 1936	Jury (GBR); 1929
Dam Social Butterfly (USA) 1957	Your Host (USA); 1947	Alibhai (GBR); 1938	Hyperion (GBR); 1930
Dam Social Butterfly (USA) 1957	Your Host (USA); 1947	Alibhai (GBR); 1938	Teresina (GBR); 1920
Dam Social Butterfly (USA) 1957	Your Host (USA); 1947	Boudoir (GBR); 1938	Mahmoud (FRA); 1933
Dam Social Butterfly (USA) 1957	Your Host (USA); 1947	Boudoir (GBR); 1938	Kampala (FRA); 1933
Dam Social Butterfly (USA) 1957	Wisteria (USA); 1948	Easton (FRA); 1931	Dark Legend (GBR); 1914
Dam Social Butterfly (USA) 1957	Wisteria (USA); 1948	Easton (FRA); 1931	Phaona (GBR); 1923
Dam Social Butterfly (USA) 1957	Wisteria (USA); 1948	Blue Cyprus (USA); 1941	Blue Larkspur (USA); 1926
Dam Social Butterfly (USA) 1957	Wisteria (USA); 1948	Blue Cyprus (USA); 1941	Peggy Porter (USA) (Family:1-w); 1934

- Tosho Boy was inbred 3S x 4D to Hyperion, meaning that this stallion appears in both the third generation of his sire's side and the fourth generation of his dam's side of his pedigree.
