= Shizunai, Hokkaido =

Dissolved municipality in Shizunai district, Hokkaido, Japan

Shizunai 静内町 しずないちょう
- Town
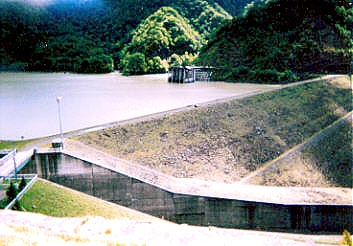
- Takami dam (Shizunai river)

- Flag Seal
- Interactive map of Shizunai
- Country: Japan
- Region: Hokkaido
- Prefecture: Hokkaido
- Subprefecture: Hidaka
- District: Shizunai

Area
  - Total: 801.51 km^{2} (309.46 sq mi)

Population (2004)
  - Total: 22,681
  - Density: 28.298/km^{2} (73.291/sq mi)

Shizunai (静内町, Shizunai-chō) was a town located in Shizunai District, Hidaka Subprefecture, Hokkaido, Japan.

== Population ==
As of 2004, the town had an estimated population of 22,581 and a density of 28.17 persons per km^{2}. The total area was 801.51 km^{2}.

== History ==
On March 31, 2006, Shizunai was merged with the town of Mitsuishi (from Mitsuishi District) to create the new town of Shinhidaka (in the newly created Hidaka District).

Shizunai was the most populous town and was the economic center of Hidaka Subprefecture.

== Attractions ==
Nijikken-dōro (二十間道路, lit. road 36 meter in width), the avenue of cherry blossoms, was a major tourist attraction of the town.

== Climate ==
Climate data for Shizunai (1991−2020 normals, extremes 1977−present)
Month	Jan	Feb	Mar	Apr	May	Jun	Jul	Aug	Sep	Oct	Nov	Dec	Year
Record high °C (°F)	10.4 (50.7)	11.4 (52.5)	15.9 (60.6)	21.7 (71.1)	24.8 (76.6)	28.4 (83.1)	31.7 (89.1)	31.5 (88.7)	29.3 (84.7)	23.8 (74.8)	20.2 (68.4)	15.7 (60.3)	31.7 (89.1)
Mean daily maximum °C (°F)	0.7 (33.3)	1.2 (34.2)	4.8 (40.6)	9.9 (49.8)	15.0 (59.0)	18.3 (64.9)	22.0 (71.6)	24.0 (75.2)	22.0 (71.6)	16.3 (61.3)	9.7 (49.5)	3.1 (37.6)	12.3 (54.0)
Daily mean °C (°F)	−3.4 (25.9)	−2.9 (26.8)	0.8 (33.4)	5.7 (42.3)	10.8 (51.4)	14.7 (58.5)	18.7 (65.7)	20.7 (69.3)	17.8 (64.0)	11.6 (52.9)	5.3 (41.5)	−0.8 (30.6)	8.2 (46.9)
Mean daily minimum °C (°F)	−7.8 (18.0)	−7.7 (18.1)	−3.3 (26.1)	1.4 (34.5)	6.6 (43.9)	11.4 (52.5)	16.1 (61.0)	17.8 (64.0)	13.7 (56.7)	6.8 (44.2)	0.9 (33.6)	−4.9 (23.2)	4.3 (39.7)
Record low °C (°F)	−18.0 (−0.4)	−17.9 (−0.2)	−19.8 (−3.6)	−9.9 (14.2)	−1.9 (28.6)	3.0 (37.4)	8.1 (46.6)	8.8 (47.8)	3.5 (38.3)	−2.2 (28.0)	−9.5 (14.9)	−14.6 (5.7)	−19.8 (−3.6)
Average precipitation mm (inches)	31.6 (1.24)	25.5 (1.00)	46.4 (1.83)	74.2 (2.92)	114.9 (4.52)	86.4 (3.40)	131.6 (5.18)	170.9 (6.73)	131.4 (5.17)	98.2 (3.87)	80.6 (3.17)	51.7 (2.04)	1,043.3 (41.07)
Average snowfall cm (inches)	56 (22)	54 (21)	32 (13)	8 (3.1)	2 (0.8)	0 (0)	0 (0)	0 (0)	0 (0)	0 (0)	5 (2.0)	31 (12)	188 (74)
Average rainy days	6.6	6.2	7.4	9.8	10.2	8.6	10.4	10.6	10.1	10.8	11.7	9.7	112.1
Average snowy days	7.8	7.2	4.3	1.0	0.3	0	0	0	0	0	0.7	4.3	25.6
Mean monthly sunshine hours	138.5	156.2	188.9	190.1	199.9	163.0	128.2	144.7	152.6	156.0	116.1	113.7	1,849.9
Source 1: JMA
Source 2: JMA
