= Arima Kinen =

Horse race in Japan

Arima Kinen Nakayama Grand Prix 有馬記念 中山グランプリ
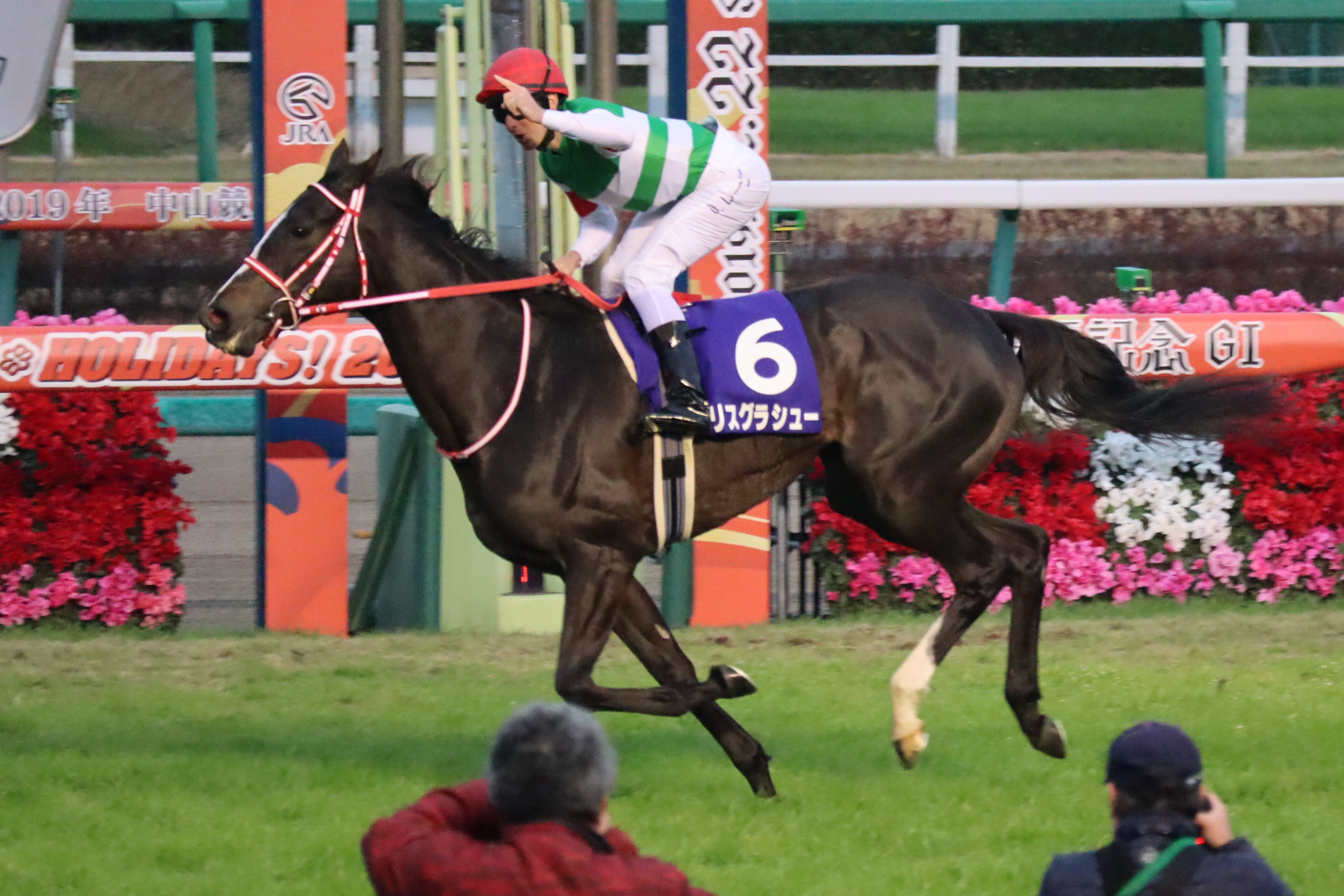
- 2019 Arima Kinen winner Lys Gracieux
- Class: Grade I
- Location: Nakayama Racecourse
- Inaugurated: December 23, 1956
- Race type: Thoroughbred - Flat race
- Website: japanracing.jp

Race information
- Distance: 2,500 metres (1m 4 1/2f)
- Record: Zenno Rob Roy, 2:29.5
- Surface: Turf
- Track: Right-handed
- Qualification: Three-years-old and up
- Weight: 56 kg (3yo); 58 kg (4yo+); Allowances; 2 kg for fillies and mares 2 kg for S. Hemisphere 3yos
- Purse: ¥ 1,080,000,000 (as of 2025): 1st: ¥ 500,000,000; 2nd: ¥ 200,000,000; 3rd: ¥ 125,000,000
- Bonuses: Winner of the following in the same year: Tenno Sho (Autumn), Japan Cup, Arima Kinen; Domestic: ¥ 300,000,000; International: ¥ 150,000,000; Winner of any three of the following in the same year: Ōsaka Hai, Tenno Sho (Spring/Autumn), Japan Cup, Takarazuka Kinen, Arima Kinen; Domestic: ¥ 200,000,000; International: ¥ 100,000,000

The Arima Kinen (有馬記念) is a Grade I flat horse race in Japan open to Thoroughbreds three-years-old and above and is the world's largest betting horserace. It is run on the fourth Sunday of December each year, over a distance of 2,500 metres (approximately 1 mile and 4 1/2 furlongs) at Nakayama Racecourse. It is one of the two "All-Star" races in Japanese horse racing; the other is the Takarazuka Kinen in late June.

The event was first run in 1956, and was initially titled the Nakayama Grand Prix (中山グランプリ). The following year it was renamed in memory of Yoriyasu Arima (1884–1957), chairman of the Japan Racing Association and the founder of the race. The distance was originally set at 2,600 metres, and shortened to the present length, 2,500 metres, in 1966.

The majority of the runners (10 out of 16) in the field are selected by a vote from racing fans, which must be a Japan Racing Association horse. If any horse among the top 10 decides not to participate in the race, the void will be filled by the next available horse until 10 runners are confirmed. The remaining six horses (including National Association of Racing (NAR) and foreign-based horses) are determined by the amount of prize money won.

Until 1999 the Arima Kinen was open to Japanese trained horses only. However, the Japan Racing Association introduced a new condition in 2000 which allowed for the participation of a foreign trained horse, if it had won that year's Japan Cup (although no such eligible horse has participated in this race). The Arima Kinen was classed as a Domestic Grade I until 2006. It was then promoted to an International Grade I in 2007. Consequently, it is now possible for more foreign trained horses to compete in the race. The maximum number of these was set at four in 2007, and increased to six for the 2008 running.

== History ==
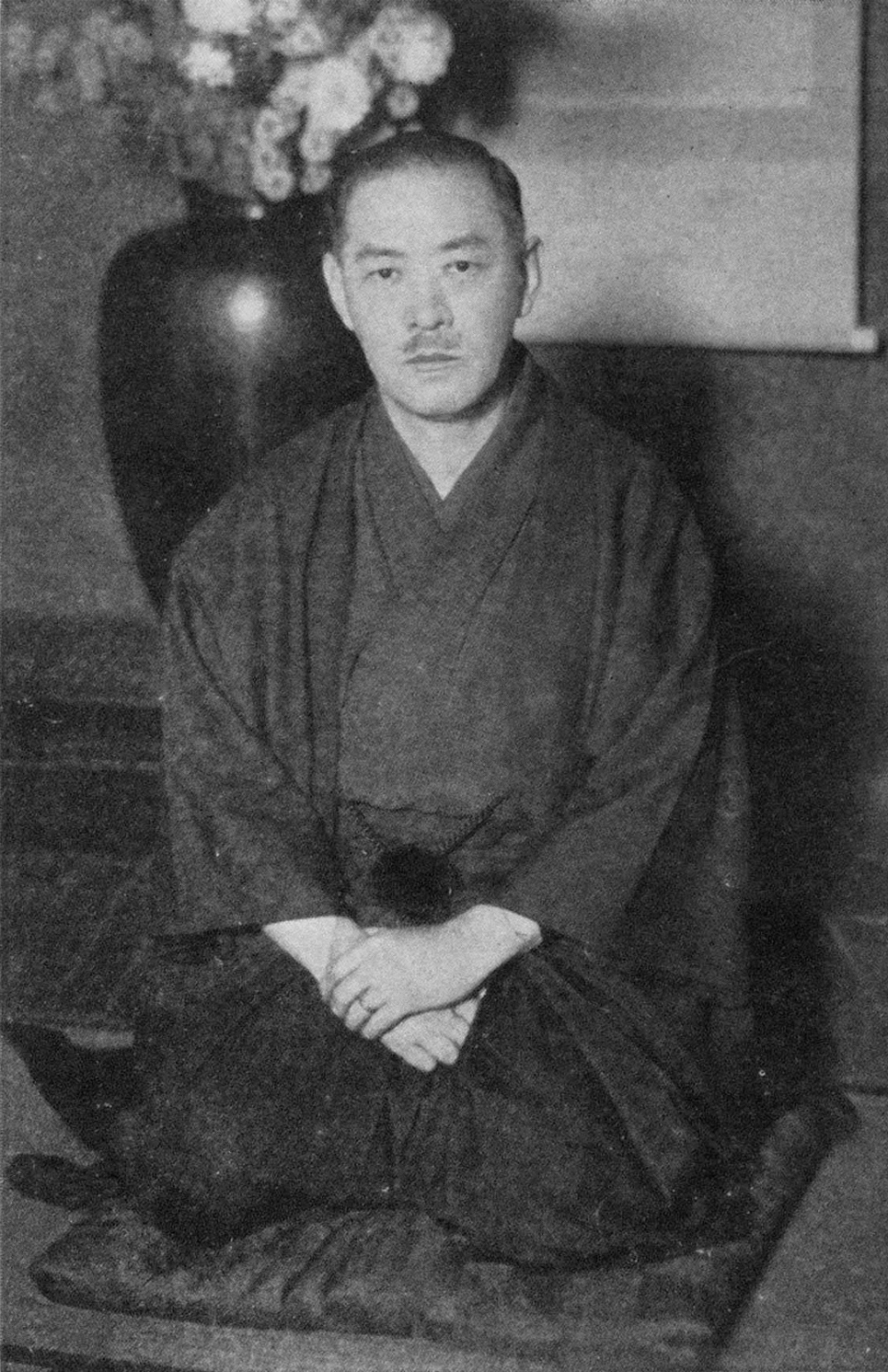
Yoriyasu Arima, founder of the race (1884–1957)

=== Yoriyasu Arima and "Arima Special Provisions Law" ===
The General Headquarters of the Supreme Commander for the Allied Powers (GHQ), which occupied Japan after the World War II and exercised indirect rule, viewed the Japan Racing Society, the only nationwide organization for horse racing in Japan at the time, as a problematic entity that violated the Anti-Monopoly Law, and ordered its closure.

Following the enactment of the new Horse Racing Law in July 1948, the Japan Racing Society was dissolved, and for a time afterward, horse racing was operated by the Horse Racing Department of the Ministry of Agriculture and Forestry (state-run horse racing).

In 1951, when Japan's sovereignty was restored with the signing of the San Francisco Peace Treaty, the "theory of privatizing horse racing" became active, leading to the establishment of the Japan Racing Association in 1954, a privately run (supervised by the Ministry of Agriculture and Forestry) horse racing organization.

However, due to the high deduction rate set in the name of contributing to the national treasury, spectators turned to new public gambling activities such as local horse racing and bicycle racing, and the sales of the first race held after privatization did not reach the target amount, indicating that its operation faced many difficulties.

The first chairman of the Japan Racing Association was Izaemon Yasuda, the founder of the Tokyo Yushun (Japanese Derby) in 1932, who had been working to promote horse racing since the Russo-Japanese War and was known as the "Old Man of Horse Racing." However, after a conflict with Minister of Agriculture and Forestry Ichirō Kōno, he resigned on March 11, 1955. On April 4 of the same year, Yoriyasu Arima, who had served as Minister of Agriculture and Forestry in the First Konoe Cabinet but was "a complete novice when it came to horse racing," became the second chairman.

During the era of state-run horse racing, large-scale renovations could not be carried out due to budget constraints. In particular, the grandstand at Nakayama Racecourse was in a dilapidated and dangerous state, but the Japan Racing Association at the time did not have the funds to renovate it.

Therefore, Arima, who became the chairman, lobbied Minister of Agriculture and Forestry Ichirō Kōno and other government officials to pass the "Law Concerning Temporary Special Provisions for National Treasury Payments, etc., of the Japan Racing Association" (the so-called "Arima Special Provisions Law"), which stipulated that "until December 31, 1960, the Japan Racing Association may use the profits obtained from temporary horse racing events held with the permission of the Minister of Agriculture and Forestry to renovate government-designated buildings, and shall not be obligated to pay a portion of the profits to the national treasury."

Then, on January 1, 1956, the main grandstand at Nakayama Racecourse became the first "structure designated by government ordinance" to which this law applied. After an eight-day temporary race meeting was held at Nakayama under a special law on March 22, the first phase of construction, including the construction of the new grandstand, was completed on October 13.

=== Establishment of "Nakayama Grand Prix" and rename to "Arima Kinen" ===
Until 1955, the Nakayama Daishogai was the biggest attraction at Nakayama Racecourse at the end of the year. However, it lacked the glamour of races like the Tokyo Yushun (Japanese Derby).

Yoriyasu Arima, the chairman of the Japan Racing Association at the time, was also known for his deep knowledge of sports and had previously owned the professional baseball team Tokyo Senators before the World War II.

In 1956, with the completion of the new grandstand at Nakayama Racecourse, Arima conceived the idea of creating a major race at the end of the year that would rival the Japanese Derby, and to liven up the newly renovated Nakayama Racecourse, he drew inspiration from the All-Star Game of professional baseball, in which he had been deeply involved, and proposed the All-Star Race for Japan Racing Association, a race in which the participating horses would be selected by popular vote to please the horse racing fans.

At the time, the Nakayama Racecourse hosted two major races: the Satsuki Sho (Japanese 2000 Guineas) and the Nakayama Daishogai. However, compared to Tokyo Racecourse, another major racecourse in the Kanto region, which hosted prestigious races such as the Tokyo Yushun (Japanese Derby), Tenno Sho (Autumn), and Yushun Himba (Japanese Oaks), there was a perception among those involved with Nakayama Racecourse that its prestige was inferior. Therefore, this proposal was well-received. Furthermore, this race was designed to be a championship race for Japan, pitting three-year-old horses that had completed the classic races against horses that had competed in the Tenno Sho (Autumn), the ultimate goal for older horses (four years and older).

A unique system for selecting participating horses through fan voting was adopted, and the race was established in 1956 under the name "Nakayama Grand Prix."

The first Nakayama Grand Prix was held on December 23, 1956, at the newly renovated Nakayama Racecourse. Of the 12 horses that participated, three were winners of the Tenno Sho and four were winners of classic races, bringing together the strongest horses of the time. In an era when 10,000 spectators was considered a large turnout at Nakayama Racecourse, the event was a great success with 27,801 attendees. Meiji Hikari (who was inducted into the Japan Racing Association Hall of Fame in 1990), winner of the 1955 Kikuka Sho and the 1956 Tenno Sho (Spring), lived up to his status as the favorite, winning convincingly by a margin of 3 1/2 lengths in a time of 2:43.2, which was the Japanese record at the time for the 2,600 metres turf race.

However, just 17 days after the highly successful first Nakayama Grand Prix, on January 9, 1957, the founder, Arima, suddenly passed away at the age of 72 due to acute pneumonia. As a result, from the second race onwards, the race was renamed "Arima Kinen (the XXth Grand Prix)" in honor of Arima's achievements. Since then, it has become established as the race that concludes the year in Japanese horse racing. The venue has remained Nakayama Racecourse since its establishment, and the timing of the race has also remained fixed in late December.

The Arima Kinen has become one of the cornerstone races in Japanese horse racing, boasting the highest sales of betting tickets in Japan. In 1996, it was recognized by the Guinness World Records for generating 87.5 billion yen in sales, the highest amount ever for a horse race worldwide, and is recognized not only in the horse racing world but also socially as an iconic seasonal symbol of year-end in Japan.

== Records ==
Speed record:

- 2:29.5 – Zenno Rob Roy (2004)

Widest winning margin:

- 9 lengths - Symboli Kris S (2003)

Multiple winners:

- 2 – Speed Symboli (1969, 1970)
- 2 – Symboli Rudolf (1984, 1985)
- 2 – Oguri Cap (1988, 1990)
- 2 – Grass Wonder (1998, 1999)
- 2 – Symboli Kris S (2002, 2003)
- 2 – Orfevre (2011, 2013)

Most wins by a jockey:

- 4 – Kenichi Ikezoe (2009/Dream Journey, 2011, 2013/Orfevre, 2018/Blast Onepiece)
- 4 – Yutaka Take (1990/Oguri Cap, 2006/Deep Impact, 2017/Kitasan Black, 2023/Do Deuce)

Most wins by a trainer:

- 4 – Yasutoshi Ikee (2009, 2011, 2013, 2016)

Most wins by an owner:

- 7 – Sunday Racing (2009, 2011, 2013, 2014, 2020, 2024, 2025)
- The youngest winning jockey: Yutaka Take (1990 Oguri Cap, 21 Years old, 9 Months 9 Days)
- The oldest winning jockey: Yutaka Take (2023 Do Deuce, 54 Years old 9 Months 10 Days)

== Winners since 1979 ==
Year	Winner	Age	Jockey	Trainer	Owner	Time
1979	Green Grass	6	Shoichi Osaki	Takao Nakano	Kichishiro Hanzawa	2:35.4
1980	Hoyo Boy	5	Kazuhiro Kato	Toshio Nihonyanagi	Yoshiharu Furukawa	2:33.7
1981	Amber Shadai	4	Shinji Azuma	Toshio Nihonyanagi	Zenya Yoshida	2:35.5
1982	Hikari Duel	5	Hiroshi Kawachi	Hikozo Sugai	Zenkichi Hashimoto	2:36.7
1983	Lead Hoyu	3	Seiki Tabara	Masatoshi Hattori	Yoshio Kumamoto	2:34.0
1984	Symboli Rudolf	3	Yukio Okabe	Yuji Nohira	Symboli Stud	2:32.8
1985	Symboli Rudolf	4	Yukio Okabe	Yuji Nohira	Symboli Stud	2:33.1
1986	Dyna Gulliver	3	Sueo Masuzawa	Kichisaburo Matsuyama	Shadai Race Horse	2:34.0
1987	Mejiro Durren	4	Yoshiyuki Muramoto	Yasuo Ikee	Mejiro Farm	2:33.9
1988	Oguri Cap	3	Yukio Okabe	Tsutomu Setoguchi	Isao Sahashi	2:33.9
1989	Inari One	5	Masato Shibata	Kiyoshi Suzuki	Hiroki Hotehama	2:31.7
1990	Oguri Cap	5	Yutaka Take	Tsutomu Setoguchi	Shunsuke Kondo	2:34.2
1991	Dai Yusaku	6	Shigefumi Kumazawa	Shigeharu Naito	Kohei Hashimoto	2:30.6
1992	Mejiro Palmer	5	Taisei Yamada	Masaaki Okubo	Mejiro Farm	2:33.5
1993	Tokai Teio	5	Seiki Tabara	Shouichi Matsumoto	Masanori Uchimura	2:30.9
1994	Narita Brian	3	Katsumi Minai	Masaaki Okubo	Hidenori Yamaji	2:32.2
1995	Mayano Top Gun	3	Seiki Tabara	Masahiro Sakaguchi	Yu Tadokoro	2:33.6
1996	Sakura Laurel	5	Norihiro Yokoyama	Katsutaro Sakai	Sakura Commerce	2:33.8
1997	Silk Justice	3	Shinji Fujita	Masaaki Okubo	Silk Co Ltd	2:34.8
1998	Grass Wonder	3	Hitoshi Matoba	Mitsuhiro Ogata	Y. Hanzawa	2:32.1
1999	Grass Wonder	4	Hitoshi Matoba	Mitsuhiro Ogata	Y. Hanzawa	2:37.2
2000	T. M. Opera O	4	Ryuji Wada	Ichizo Iwamoto	Masatsugu Takezono	2:34.1
2001	Manhattan Cafe	3	Masayoshi Ebina	Futoshi Kojima	Ken Nishikawa	2:33.1
2002	Symboli Kris S	3	Olivier Peslier	Kazuo Fujisawa	Symboli Stud	2:32.6
2003	Symboli Kris S	4	Olivier Peslier	Kazuo Fujisawa	Symboli Stud	2:30.5
2004	Zenno Rob Roy	4	Olivier Peslier	Kazuo Fujisawa	Shinobu Oosako	2:29.5
2005	Heart's Cry	4	Christophe Lemaire	Kojiro Hashiguchi	Shadai Racehorse	2:31.9
2006	Deep Impact	4	Yutaka Take	Yasuo Ikee	Kaneko Makoto Holdings	2:31.9
2007	Matsurida Gogh	4	Masayoshi Ebina	Sakae Kunieda	Fumie Takahashi	2:33.6
2008	Daiwa Scarlet	4	Katsumi Ando	Kunihide Matsuda	Keizo Oshiro	2:31.5
2009	Dream Journey	5	Kenichi Ikezoe	Yasutoshi Ikee	Sunday Racing	2:30.0
2010	Victoire Pisa	3	Mirco Demuro	Katsuhiko Sumii	Yoshimi Ichikawa	2:32.6
2011	Orfevre	3	Kenichi Ikezoe	Yasutoshi Ikee	Sunday Racing	2:36.0
2012	Gold Ship	3	Hiroyuki Uchida	Naosuke Sugai	Eiichi Kobayashi	2:31.9
2013	Orfevre	5	Kenichi Ikezoe	Yasutoshi Ikee	Sunday Racing Co. Ltd.	2:32.3
2014	Gentildonna	5	Keita Tosaki	Sei Ishizaka	Sunday Racing Co. Ltd.	2:35.3
2015	Gold Actor	4	Hayato Yoshida	Tadashige Nakagawa	Kaname Ishiro	2:33.0
2016	Satono Diamond	3	Christophe Lemaire	Yasutoshi Ikee	Hajime Satomi	2:32.6
2017	Kitasan Black	5	Yutaka Take	Hisashi Shimizu	Ono Shoji	2:33.6
2018	Blast Onepiece	3	Kenichi Ikezoe	Masahiro Otake	Silk Racing Co Ltd	2:32.2
2019	Lys Gracieux	5	Damian Lane	Yoshito Yahagi	Carrot Farm	2:30.5
2020	Chrono Genesis	4	Yuichi Kitamura	Takashi Saito	Sunday Racing	2:35.0
2021	Efforia	3	Takeshi Yokoyama	Yuichi Shikato	Carrot Farm	2:32.0
2022	Equinox	3	Christophe Lemaire	Tetsuya Kimura	Silk Racing Co Ltd	2:32.4
2023	Do Deuce	4	Yutaka Take	Yasuo Tomomichi	Kieffers Co Ltd	2:30.9
2024	Regaleira	3	Keita Tosaki	Tetsuya Kimura	Sunday Racing	2:31.8
2025	Museum Mile	3	Cristian Demuro	Daisuke Takayanagi	Sunday Racing	2:31.5

== Vote leaders since 1984 ==
Year	Leader	Age	Votes Received	Race Result	Ref
1984	Mr. C. B.	4	171,979	3rd	
1985	Symboli Rudolf	4	140,753	Winner	
1986	Miho Shinzan	4	168,210	3rd	
1987	Sakura Star O	3	141,494	Did Not Finish	
1988	Tamamo Cross	4	183,473	2nd	
1989	Oguri Cap	4	197,682	5th	
1990	Oguri Cap	5	146,738	Winner	
1991	Mejiro McQueen	4	155,353	2nd	
1992	Tokai Teio	4	177,926	11th	
1993	Biwa Hayahide	3	146,218	2nd	
1994	Narita Brian	3	178,471	Winner	
1995	Hishi Amazon	4	173,689	5th	
1996	Mayano Top Gun	4	155,122	7th	
1997	Air Groove	4	142,596	3rd	
1998	Air Groove	5	165,357	5th	
1999	Special Week	4	165,734	2nd	
2000	T. M. Opera O	4	109,140	Winner	
2001	T. M. Opera O	5	93,217	5th	
2002	Narita Top Road	6	91,122	4th	
2003	Symboli Kris S	4	125,116	Winner	
2004	Zenno Rob Roy^{[1]}	4	100,052	Winner	
2005	Deep Impact	3	160,297	2nd	
2006	Deep Impact	4	119,940	Winner	
2007	Vodka	3	105,441	11th	
2008	Vodka	4	136,619	Not in race	
2009	Vodka	5	105,059	Not in race^{[2]}	
2010	Buena Vista	4	111,323	2nd	
2011	Buena Vista	5	109,247	7th	
2012	Orfevre	4	90,474	Not in race	
2013	Orfevre	5	81,198	Winner	
2014	Gold Ship	5	66,796	3rd	
2015	Gold Ship	6	120,981	8th	
2016	Kitasan Black	4	137,353	2nd	
2017	Kitasan Black	5	124,641	Winner	
2018	Rey de Oro	4	110,293	2nd	
2019	Almond Eye	4	109,885	9th	
2020	Chrono Genesis	4	214,472	Winner	
2021	Efforia	3	260,742	Winner	
2022	Titleholder	4	368,304	9th	
2023	Equinox	4	342,637	Not in race	
2024	Do Deuce	5	478,415	Scratched	
2025	Regaleira	4	612,771	4th	

^{1} In 2004 vote, Zenno Rob Roy was estimated to have received fewer votes than Cosmo Bulk (Deduced from the official result of Internet vote). However, as Cosmo Bulk was not a Japan Racing Association horse (but belonged to Hokkaido Keiba from NAR) all votes cast for him were invalid.
^{2} Vodka was not allowed to participate in the 2009 race, as she was on a 1-month suspension due to nose bleeding in the Japan Cup.

== Earlier winners ==
- 1956 - Meiji Hikari
- 1957 - Haku Chikara
- 1958 - Onward There
- 1959 - Garnet
- 1960 - Star Roch
- 1961 - Homareboshi
- 1962 - Onslaught
- 1963 - Ryu Forel
- 1964 - Yamato Kyodai
- 1965 - Shinzan
- 1966 - Korehide
- 1967 - Kabuto Ciro
- 1968 - Ryuzuki
- 1969 - Speed Symboli
- 1970 - Speed Symboli
- 1971 - Tomei
- 1972 - Ishino Hikaru
- 1973 - Strong Eight
- 1974 - Tanino Chikara
- 1975 - Ishino Arashi
- 1976 - Tosho Boy
- 1977 - Ten Point
- 1978 - Kane Minobu

== In popular culture ==
The TBS Television TV Series Passing the Reins revolves around the main characters aiming to win the Arima Kinen with a horse from Hidaka.

In addition, a number of the races have been portrayed in Umamusume: Pretty Derby in anime and manga by the personifications of the horses who participated in them:

- The 1988 race, which was Tamamo Cross' retirement race and Oguri Cap's first and only win against Tamamo Cross, is portrayed in Umamusume: Cinderella Gray, which portrays Oguri Cap's racing career, in both manga and "Gray Phantom", the 22nd episode of Season 1 of its anime. The Nakayama Racecourse Horse Owners' Association also invited Umamusume's voice actresses for Oguri Cap (Tomoyo Takayanagi), Tamamo Cross (Naomi Ōzora) and Super Creek (Kana Yūki) to attend the 2025 race coinciding with the airing of "Gray Phantom", and the three also participated in the award ceremony.
- The 1990 race – Oguri Cap's retirement race – is also the final race of the Cinderella Gray manga.
- The 1993 race, which was Tokai Teio's comeback and ultimately final race after a year injured, is portrayed in "Galloping After Our Dreams", the finale of the second season of the main Umamusume: Pretty Derby anime. The scene also incorporates the actual words of the broadcast call.
- The 2015 race, which was Gold Ship's retirement race, is portrayed in "The Dream Never Ends", the 3rd episode of Season 3 of the main anime.
- The 2016 race, which featured Satono Diamond winning the race and Kitasan Black coming in second, is portrayed in "Our Arima Kinen", the 7th episode of the same season.
- The 2017 race, which was Kitasan Black's retirement race, is portrayed in "And Yours...", the 13th episode of the same season.

== See also ==
- Horse racing in Japan
- List of Japanese flat horse races
