= Mitsuishi Dam =

Dam in Hokkaido Prefecture, Japan

- Location within Japan
- Location: Hokkaido Prefecture, Japan
- Coordinates: 42°22′54″N 142°41′46″E
- Construction began: 1970
- Opening date: 1991

Dam and spillways
- Height: 35 m (115 ft)
- Length: 240 m (790 ft)

Reservoir
- Total capacity: 8170 thousand cubic meters
- Catchment area: 25 sq. km
- Surface area: 74 hectares

Mitsuishi Dam (Japanese: 三石ダム) is a rockfill dam located in Hokkaido Prefecture in Japan. The dam is used for irrigation. The catchment area of the dam is 25 km^{2}. The dam impounds about 74 ha of land when full and can store 8170 thousand cubic meters of water. The construction of the dam was started on 1970 and completed in 1991.
