= Shizunai District, Hokkaido =

Former district in Hokkaido, Japan

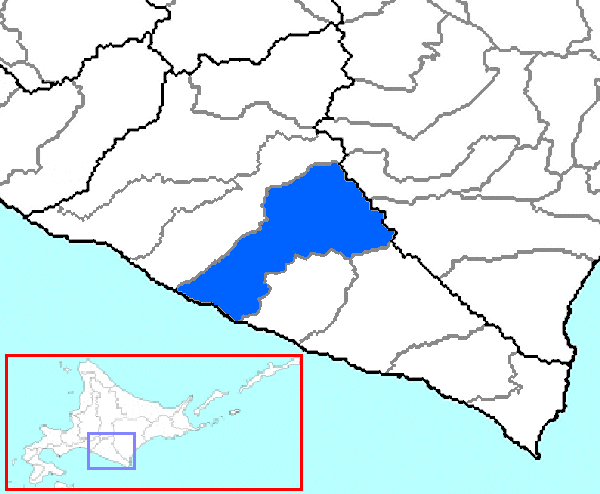
Shizunai District in Hidaka Subprefecture before merging with Mitsuishi District in 2006.

Shizunai (静内郡, Shizunai-gun) was a district located in Hidaka Subprefecture, Hokkaido, Japan.

In 2004, the district had an estimated population of 22,581 and a density of 28.17 persons per km^{2}. The total area was 801.51 km^{2}.

On March 31, 2006, Shizunai District merged with Mitsuishi District to create the newly created Hidaka District. Mitsuishi District and Shizunai District were both dissolved with this merger.

== Towns and villages ==
- Shizunai
