= Mitsuishi District, Hokkaido =

Former district in Hokkaido, Japan

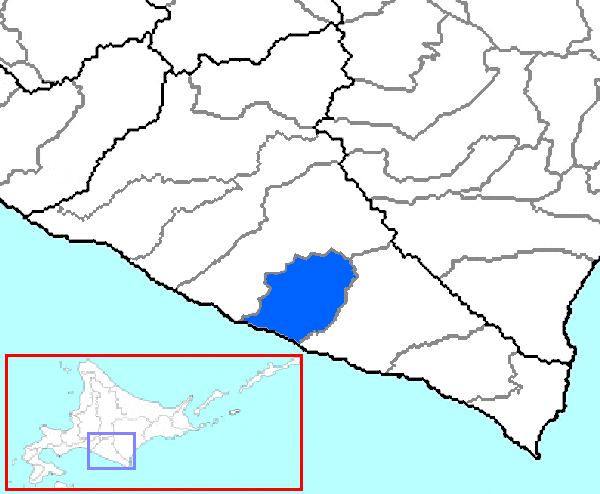
Mitsuishi District in Hidaka Subprefecture before merging with Shizuani District in 2006.

Mitsuishi (三石郡, Mitsuishi-gun) was a district located in Hidaka Subprefecture, Hokkaido, Japan.

As of 2004, the district had an estimated population of 4,950 and a density of 14.30 persons per km^{2}. The total area was 346.23 km^{2}.

On March 31, 2006, Mitsuishi District merged with Shizunai District to create the new Hidaka District. Mitsuishi District and Shizunai District were both dissolved with this merger.

== Towns and villages ==
- Mitsuishi
