= Hidaka District, Hokkaido =

District in Hokkaido, Japan

Coordinates: 42.438°N 142.637°E

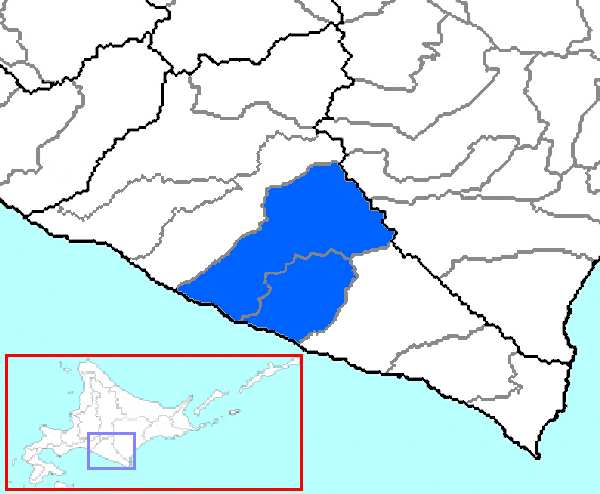
Hidaka District in Hidaka Subprefecture

Hidaka (日高郡, Hidaka-gun; Japanese pronunciation: [çiꜜ.da.ka, çi.da.kaꜜ.ɡɯɴ]) is a newly created district located in Hidaka Subprefecture, Hokkaido, Japan.

As of October 31, 2006, the district has an estimated population of 27,150 and a density of 23.7 persons per km^{2}. The total area is 1,147.74 km^{2}.

== Towns and villages ==
- Shinhidaka - merger of the former towns of Mitsuishi (from the former Mitsuishi District) and Shizunai (from the former Shizunai District)
