= Special Week =

Japanese-bred Thoroughbred racehorse

Special Week スペシャルウィーク
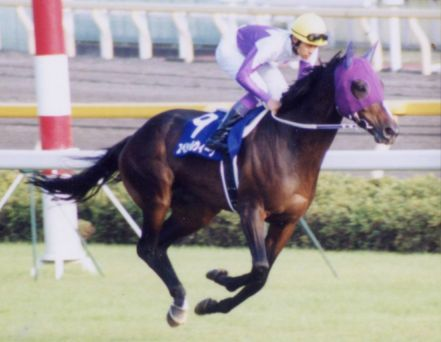
- Special Week racing at the 1999 Autumn Tennō Shō.
- Breed: Thoroughbred
- Sire: Sunday Silence (USA)
- Grandsire: Halo (USA)
- Dam: Campaign Girl (JPN)
- Damsire: Maruzensky (JPN)
- Sex: Stallion
- Foaled: May 2, 1995
- Died: April 27, 2018 (aged 22)
- Country: Japan
- Colour: Dark bay
- Breeder: Hidaka Taiyo Bokujo
- Owner: Hiroyoshi Usuda
- Racing colors
- Trainer: Toshiaki Shirai
- Jockey: Yutaka Take; Yukio Okabe; Olivier Peslier
- Record: 17: 10-4-2
- Earnings: ¥1,092,623,000

Major wins
- Kisaragi Sho (1998); Yayoi Sho (1998); Kyoto Shimbun Hai (1998); American Jockey Club Cup (1999); Hanshin Daishoten (1999); Tenno Sho (Spring) (1999); Tenno Sho (Autumn) (1999); Japan Cup (1999); Japanese Classic Race wins: Tokyo Yushun (1998)

Awards
- JRA Special Award (1999)

Honours
- Timeform rating: 125

Special Week (Japanese: スペシャルウィーク, Hepburn: Supesharu Wīku; 2 May 1995 – 27 April 2018) was a Japanese Thoroughbred racehorse and sire. From 1997 to 1999, he won ten of his seventeen races including four at Grade I level. After winning his only start as a juvenile he emerged as a top-class performer in the following season: he won the Tokyo Yushun (Japanese Derby) and three other graded races as well as being placed in the Satsuki Sho, Kikuka Sho and the Japan Cup. He performed even better as a four-year-old in 1999, winning the Hanshin Daishoten, the spring and autumn editions of the Tenno Sho, and the Japan Cup. In the last-named race he defeated a strong international field including the winners of the Prix de l'Arc de Triomphe and The Derby.

== Background ==
Special Week was a brown horse with a white blaze standing 16.1¾ hands high, bred in Japan by Hidaka Taiyo Bokujo and sired by Sunday Silence. Special Week's dam Campaign Girl was an unraced daughter of Maruzensky and was a great-granddaughter of the leading Japanese broodmare Shiraoki. Campaign Girl died shortly after foaling Special Week and the colt had to be hand-fed by stable staff.

During his racing career the colt was owned by Hiroyoshi Usuda, trained by Toshiaki Shirai and ridden in most of his races by Yutaka Take.

== Racing career ==
=== 1997: two-year-old season ===
On his only appearance as a two-year-old, Special Week ran in a maiden race over 1600 metres at Hanshin Racecourse on 19 November. He made a successful debut, beating thirteen opponents headed by Legacy Hunter.

=== 1998: three-year-old season ===
Special Week began his second season by finishing second to Asahi Creek in the Shiraume Sho over 1600 metres at Kyoto Racecourse in January. In the following month was moved up in class and distance for the Grade III Kisaragi Sho over 1800 metres at the same course and recorded his first major win, beating Bold Emperor and thirteen others. In March he was stepped up again for the Grade II Hochi Hai Yayoi Sho (the major trial race for the Satsuki Sho) over 2000 metres at Nakayama Racecourse and won from Seiun Sky and King Halo. In the Satsuki Sho over the same course and distance on 19 April he was unable to reproduce his earlier form and finished third, beaten half a length and a length by Seiun Sky and King Halo. On 7 June, Special Week was one of a field of eighteen colts, also including Seiun Sky and King Halo, to contest the Tokyo Yushun over 2400 metres at Tokyo Racecourse. Special Week won by five lengths from Bold Emperor with Daiwa Superior taking third ahead of Seiun Sky.

After a four-month break, Special Week returned in October for the Grade II Kyoto Shimbun Hai over 2200 metres on 18 October and won from King Halo. On 8 November he faced King Halo, Bold Emperor, Seiun Sky and Daiwa Superior in the Grade I Kikuka Sho over 3000 metres at Kyoto Racecourse. He finished second of the eighteen runners behind Seiun Sky, who won in a course record time of 3:03.2. On his final start of the season Special Week was matched against older horses for the first time in the Japan Cup at Tokyo on 29 November. Ridden by Yukio Okabe, who was substituting for Take as he was serving a suspension at the time due to blocking other horses during Admire Vega's maiden race, the horse started the 2.3/1 favourite in a fifteen-runner field which included challengers from Germany, Canada, the United States and Britain. He was in sixth place entering the straight and made steady progress in the closing stages to finish third behind El Condor Pasa and Air Groove.

=== 1999: four-year-old season ===
Special Week began his third season in the Grade II American Jockey Club Stakes at Nakayama on 24 January and won from Silent Hunter and Mejiro Steed. On 21 March at Hanshin he added another Grade II win when he defeated Mejiro Bright in the 3000 metre Hanshin Daishoten. The Grade I spring edition of the Tenno Sho over the same course and distance saw Special Week matched against eleven opponents including Mejiro Bright (winner of the race in 1998), Matikanefukukitaru, Seiun Sky, Stay Gold, Silk Justice (Arima Kinen). Special Week recorded his second Grade I win as he defeated Mejiro Bright by half a length with Seiun Sky two and a half lengths back in third. In the Takarazuka Kinen over 2200 metres at Hanshin on 11 July, his final start before the summer break, Special Week was matched against Grass Wonder a colt who had been the best of his generation in 1997 but missed most of the 1998 season before returning to win the Arima Kinen in December. Special Week was beaten three lengths into second place by Grass Wonder but finished seven lengths clear of the other ten runners.

On his return to racing in autumn, Special Week finished seventh behind Tsurumaru Tsuyoshi in the Kyoto Daishoten on 10 October. In the Tenno Sho over 2000 metres at Tokyo on 31 October, Special Week attempted to become the second horse to win both the spring and autumn editions of the race in the same year. The race attracted a seventeen-runner field including Mejiro Bright, Silent Hunter, Tsurumaru Tsuyoshi, King Halo, Seiun Sky, Stay Gold, Stinger (Hanshin Juvenile Fillies) and Air Jihad (Yasuda Kinen). In a closely contested conclusion to the race, Special Week prevailed by a neck from Stay Gold, with Air Jihad, Stinger, Seiun Sky and the outsider Embrasser Moi all finishing within two lengths for the winner. The winning time of 1:58.0 was a new record for the race.

On 28 November, in front of a crowd of 155,000, Special Week made his second attempt to defeat international competition in the Japan Cup. The Prix de l'Arc de Triomphe winner Montjeu started favourite with Special Week the joint-second choice alongside the German horse Tiger Hill, twice winner of the Grosser Preis von Baden. The other European challengers were High-Rise (Epsom Derby), Borgia (Deutsches Derby & Grosser Preis von Baden) and Fruits of Love (Hardwicke Stakes) whilst Hong Kong was represented by their Horse of the Year, Indigenous. The best fancied of the other Japanese runners were Rascal Suzuka (third in the Kikuka Sho), Stay Gold and Umeno Fiber (Yushun Himba). Special Week was restrained by Take in the early stages before turning into the straight in sixth place. He took the lead approaching the last 200 metres and won by one and a half lengths and a nose from Indigenous and High-Rise, with Montjeu in fourth. Yutaka Take, who was winning the race for the first time said, "I am very pleased because I could achieve one of my dreams... I am proud to be Japanese."

Special Week ended his racing career when he met Grass Wonder for the second time in the Arima Kinen at Nakayama in December. The race produced a four-way photo finish in which Special Week was beaten a nose by Grass Wonder, with T. M. Opera O and Tsurumaru Tsuyoshi just behind.

For his efforts over the course of the season, Special Week was given a special award at the JRA Awards for 1999.

== Stud record ==
Special Week was retired from racing to stand at Shadai Stallion Station in Abira, Hokkaido. He later moved to Lex Stud where he was based in 2015.

His most successful progeny was Buena Vista, a mare who won six Grade I races and multiple JRA Awards, including the Japanese Horse of the Year award in 2010. Another notable mare to be sired by Special Week was Cesario who became the first Japanese 3-year-old horse to win an overseas Grade I race and has achieved spectacular success as a broodmare, foaling three Grade I winners.

Special Week died on April 27, 2018, from injuries sustained when he fell in his paddock at the age of 22.

=== Major winners ===
c = colt, f = filly
bold = G1/Jpn1 stakes

Grade One winners
| Foaled | Name | Sex | Major Wins |
|---|---|---|---|
| 2002 | Cesario | f | Flower Cup, **Yushun Himba**, **American Oaks** |
| 2006 | Buena Vista | f | **Hanshin Juvenile Fillies**, Tulip Sho, **Oka Shō**, **Yushun Himba**, Kyōto Kinen, **Victoria Mile**, **Tenno Sho (Autumn)**, **Japan Cup** |
| 2007 | Gold Blitz | c | Antares Stakes (twice), Mercury Cup, **Teio Sho** |
| 2008 | Roman Legend | c | Elm Stakes (twice), Miyako Stakes, **Tokyo Daishōten** |
| 2011 | Toho Jackal | c | **Kikuka-shō** |

Other winners
| Foaled | Name | Sex | Major Wins |
|---|---|---|---|
| 2001 | San Valentin | c | Fukushima Kinen, Tanabata Sho |
| 2002 | Inti Raimi | c | Kyoto Shimbun Hai, Asahi Challenge Cup, Kyōto Daishōten |
| 2002 | Smooth Baritone | c | Tokyo Sports Hai Nisai Stakes |
| 2003 | Toho Shine | f | Mermaid Stakes |
| 2004 | Osumi Daido | c | Daily Hai Nisai Stakes |
| 2006 | Blitzen | c | Lord Derby Challenge Trophy |
| 2006 | Fireflaught | c | Keisei Hai Autumn Handicap |
| 2006 | Narita Crystal | c | Niigata Kinen (twice), Chukyo Kinen |
| 2006 | Reach the Crown | c | Kisaragi Sho, Yomiuri Milers Cup |
| 2007 | Stellar Lead | f | Hakodate Nisai Stakes |
| 2007 | Tagano Elisabeth | f | Fantasy Stakes |
| 2008 | Queen's Barn | f | Hanshin Himba Stakes |
| 2010 | Arumdapta | c | Hokkaido Nisai Yushun |
| 2011 | Win Full Bloom | c | Kyoto Kimpai |

== In popular culture ==
Standee of Special Week from Umamusume at Santa Anita Park in 2026

An anthropomorphized version of Special Week appears as a character in the Japanese multimedia franchise Umamusume: Pretty Derby, voiced by Azumi Waki. The 2018 anime premiered shortly before his death. She serves as the main character and mascot of the franchise, depicted as a cheery and hard-working girl from Hokkaido who has recently enrolled in Tracen Academy.

== Racing form ==
The following racing form is based on information available on JBIS search and netkeiba.com.

| Date | Age | Distance (Condition) | Race | Class | Course | Field | Odds (Favored) | Finish | Time | Winning (Losing) Margin | Jockey | Winner (2nd Place) | Ref |
|---|---|---|---|---|---|---|---|---|---|---|---|---|---|
| Nov 29, 1997 | 2 | Turf 1600 m (Good) | Two Year Old Debut | | Hanshin | 14 | 1.4 (1st) | 1st | 1:36.9 | 2 lengths | Yutaka Take | (Legacy Hunter) | |
| Jan 6, 1998 | 3 | Turf 1600 m (Firm) | Shiraume Sho | 1 Win | Kyoto | 16 | 1.3 (1st) | 2nd | 1:36.0 | (nose) | Yutaka Take | Asahi Creek | |
| Feb 8, 1998 | 3 | Turf 1800 m (Firm) | Kisaragi Sho | GIII | Kyoto | 16 | 1.7 (1st) | 1st | 1:51.3 | 3 1/2 lengths | Yutaka Take | (Bold Emperor) | |
| Mar 8, 1998 | 3 | Turf 2000 m (Firm) | Yayoi Sho | GII | Nakayama | 13 | 2.8 (2nd) | 1st | 2:01.8 | 1/2 length | Yutaka Take | (Seiun Sky) | |
| Apr 19, 1998 | 3 | Turf 2000 m (Firm) | Satsuki Sho | GI | Nakayama | 18 | 1.8 (1st) | 3rd | 2:01.6 | (1 1/2 lengths) | Yutaka Take | Seiun Sky | |
| Jun 7, 1998 | 3 | Turf 2400 m (Good) | Tokyo Yushun | GI | Tokyo | 18 | 2.0 (1st) | 1st | 2:25.8 | 5 lengths | Yutaka Take | (Bold Emperor) | |
| Oct 18, 1998 | 3 | Turf 2200 m (Good) | Kyoto Shimbun Hai | GII | Kyoto | 16 | 1.2 (1st) | 1st | 2:15.0 | neck | Yutaka Take | (King Halo) | |
| Nov 8, 1998 | 3 | Turf 3000 m (Firm) | Kikuka Sho | GI | Kyoto | 17 | 1.5 (1st) | 2nd | 3:03.8 | (3 1/2 lengths) | Yutaka Take | Seiun Sky | |
| Nov 29, 1998 | 3 | Turf 2400 m (Firm) | Japan Cup | GI | Tokyo | 15 | 3.3 (1st) | 3rd | 2:26.4 | (3 lengths) | Yukio Okabe | El Condor Pasa | |
| Jan 24, 1999 | 4 | Turf 2200 m (Firm) | American Jockey Club Cup | GII | Nakayama | 11 | 2.0 (1st) | 1st | 2:16.8 | 3 lengths | Olivier Peslier | (Silent Hunter) | |
| Mar 21, 1999 | 4 | Turf 3000 m (Soft) | Hanshin Daishoten | GII | Hanshin | 9 | 2.1 (2nd) | 1st | 3:13.4 | 3/4 length | Yutaka Take | (Mejiro Bright) | |
| May 2, 1999 | 4 | Turf 3200 m (Firm) | Tenno Sho (Spring) | GI | Kyoto | 12 | 2.3 (1st) | 1st | 3:15.3 | 1/2 length | Yutaka Take | (Mejiro Bright) | |
| Jul 11, 1999 | 4 | Turf 2200 m (Firm) | Takarazuka Kinen | GI | Hanshin | 12 | 1.5 (1st) | 2nd | 2:12.6 | (3 lengths) | Yutaka Take | Grass Wonder | |
| Oct 10, 1999 | 4 | Turf 2400 m (Firm) | Kyoto Daishoten | GII | Kyoto | 10 | 1.8 (1st) | 7th | 2:25.1 | (5 1/2 lengths) | Yutaka Take | Tsurumaru Tsuyoshi | |
| Oct 31, 1999 | 4 | Turf 2000 m (Firm) | Tenno Sho (Autumn) | GI | Tokyo | 17 | 6.8 (4th) | 1st | R1:58.0 | neck | Yutaka Take | (Stay Gold) | |
| Nov 28, 1999 | 4 | Turf 2400 m (Firm) | Japan Cup | GI | Tokyo | 14 | 3.4 (2nd) | 1st | 2:25.5 | 1 1/2 lengths | Yutaka Take | (Indigenous) | |
| Dec 26, 1999 | 4 | Turf 2500 m (Firm) | Arima Kinen | GI | Nakayama | 14 | 3.0 (2nd) | 2nd | 2:37.2 | (nose) | Yutaka Take | Grass Wonder | |

- R on the time indicates that this was a record time

== Pedigree ==
Pedigree of Special Week (JPN), brown horse 1995
| Sire Sunday Silence (USA) 1986 | Halo (USA); 1969 | Hail to Reason | Turn-To |
| Sire Sunday Silence (USA) 1986 | Halo (USA); 1969 | Hail to Reason | Nothirdchance |
| Sire Sunday Silence (USA) 1986 | Halo (USA); 1969 | Cosmah | Cosmic Bomb |
| Sire Sunday Silence (USA) 1986 | Halo (USA); 1969 | Cosmah | Almahmoud |
| Sire Sunday Silence (USA) 1986 | Wishing Well (USA); 1975 | Understanding | Promised Land |
| Sire Sunday Silence (USA) 1986 | Wishing Well (USA); 1975 | Understanding | Pretty Ways |
| Sire Sunday Silence (USA) 1986 | Wishing Well (USA); 1975 | Mountain Flower | Montparnasse |
| Sire Sunday Silence (USA) 1986 | Wishing Well (USA); 1975 | Mountain Flower | Edel Weiss |
| Dam Campaign Girl (JPN) 1987 | Maruzensky (JPN); 1974 | Nijinsky | Northern Dancer |
| Dam Campaign Girl (JPN) 1987 | Maruzensky (JPN); 1974 | Nijinsky | Flaming Page |
| Dam Campaign Girl (JPN) 1987 | Maruzensky (JPN); 1974 | Shill | Buckpasser |
| Dam Campaign Girl (JPN) 1987 | Maruzensky (JPN); 1974 | Shill | Quill |
| Dam Campaign Girl (JPN) 1987 | Lady Shiraoki (JPN); 1978 | Saint Crespin | Aureole |
| Dam Campaign Girl (JPN) 1987 | Lady Shiraoki (JPN); 1978 | Saint Crespin | Neocracy |
| Dam Campaign Girl (JPN) 1987 | Lady Shiraoki (JPN); 1978 | Miss Ashiyagawa | Hindostan |
| Dam Campaign Girl (JPN) 1987 | Lady Shiraoki (JPN); 1978 | Miss Ashiyagawa | Shiraoki (Family 3-l) |

== See also ==
- List of racehorses
