= Grass Wonder =

American-bred Thoroughbred racehorse (1995–2025)

Grass Wonder グラスワンダー
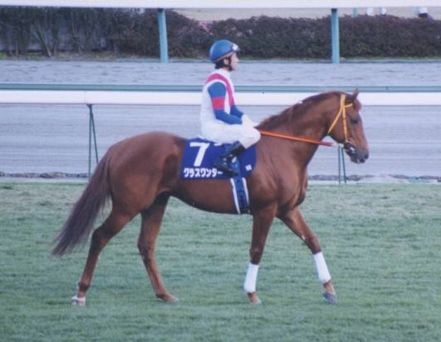
- Grass Wonder during the 1999 Arima Kinen.
- Breed: Thoroughbred
- Sire: Silver Hawk (USA)
- Grandsire: Roberto (USA)
- Dam: Ameriflora (USA)
- Damsire: Danzig (USA)
- Sex: Stallion
- Foaled: February 18, 1995
- Died: August 8, 2025 (aged 30)
- Country: United States
- Colour: Chestnut
- Breeder: Phillips Racing Partnership & John Phillips
- Owner: Hanzawa Co., Ltd.
- Racing colours
- Trainer: Mitsuhiro Ogata
- Jockey: Hitoshi Matoba
- Record: 15: 9-1-0
- Earnings: ¥691,646,000

Major wins
- Keisei Hai Sansai Stakes (1997); Asahi Hai Sansai Stakes (1997); Arima Kinen (1998, 1999); Keio Hai Spring Cup (1999); Takarazuka Kinen (1999); Mainichi Okan (1999)

Awards
- Japanese Champion 2-Year-Old Colt (1997); JRA Special Award (1999); Timeform rating: 126

Grass Wonder (Japanese: グラスワンダー, Hepburn: Gurasu Wandā; 18 February 1995 – 8 August 2025) was an American-bred Japanese-trained Thoroughbred racehorse and sire. In a racing career which lasted from 1997 until 2000 he won nine of his fifteen races including four Grade I races. He was the leading juvenile colt in Japan in 1997 when he was unbeaten in four races, culminating in a victory in the Asahi Hai Sansai Stakes. He missed most of his second season with injury problems but returned in autumn to win the Arima Kinen. He reached his peak as a four-year-old when he won the Takarazuka Kinen and a second Arima Kinen. He failed to win in three races in 2000 and was retired to stud. He had some success as a breeding stallion.

== Background ==
Grass Wonder was a chestnut horse with a white star, standing 15.3½ hands high bred in Kentucky by Phillips Racing Partnership & John Phillips, of the Darby Dan Farm. He was sired by Silver Hawk, an American-bred colt who finished third in the 1982 Epsom Derby and later became a successful breeding stallion, siring the 1997 Epsom Derby winner Benny the Dip, the 1999 St Leger winner Mutafaweq and the leading American turf performer Hawkster. Grass Wonder's dam Ameriflora was an unraced daughter of Danzig. She was a great-granddaughter of Soaring, an American broodmare who was the ancestor of many major winners including Glorious Song, Saint Ballado, Rahy and Singspiel.

The yearling was consigned to the Keeneland sale in September 1996 and was bought for $250,000 by Nobuo Tsunoda. Grass Wonder was exported to Japan where he was trained by Mitsuhiro Ogata and was mainly ridden in his races by Hitoshi Matoba.

== Racing career ==
=== 1997: two-year-old season ===
Grass Wonder began his racing by defeating nine opponents in a maiden race over 1800 metres at Nakayama Racecourse on 13 September 1997. A month later he followed up in the Ivy Stakes over 1400 metres at Tokyo Racecourse, winning from Machikane Sanshiro. In November he was moved up in class for the Grade II Keisei Hai Sansai Stakes over the same course and distance and won from Machikane Sanshiro and Courir Cyclone. On his final start of the season, Grass Wonder was one of fifteen colts to contest Japan's most prestigious race for juveniles, the Asahi Hai Sansai Stakes over 1600 metres at Nakayama on 7 December. Ridden by Matoba, he won by two and a half lengths from Meiner Love (later to win the Sprinters Stakes) who took second ahead of Figaro and Agnes World.

Grass Wonder was voted Japanese Champion 2-Year-Old Colt of 1997 at the JRA Awards.

=== 1998: three-year-old season ===
As a foreign-bred horse, Grass Wonder was not eligible to race in many of the major Japanese races for three-year-olds, and when he sustained a leg injury in March 1998, it was decided to reserve him for an autumn campaign. He made his first appearance of the year he finished fifth behind Silence Suzuka in the Grade II Mainichi Okan over 1800 metres at Tokyo in October. In the following month he was moved up in distance for the Grade II Copa Republica Argentina over 2500 metres at Tokyo and finished sixth behind Yusei Top Run.

Despite his lack of form in 1998, Grass Wonder was one of sixteen horses selected to run in the Arima Kinen over 2500 metres at Nakayama on 27 December. His opponents included Air Groove (Tenno Sho (autumn)), Matikanefukukitaru (Kikuka Sho), Mejiro Bright (Tenno Sho (spring)), Mejiro Dober (Shuka Sho, Queen Elizabeth II Commemorative Cup), Offside Trap (Tenno Sho (autumn)), Seiun Sky (Satsuki Sho, Kikuka Sho), Silk Justice (Defending Champion), Stay Gold and Yusei Top Run. Grass Wonder won by half a length from Mejiro Bright with a gap of two and a half lengths back to Stay Gold who took third place ahead of Seiun Sky.

=== 1999: four-year-old season ===
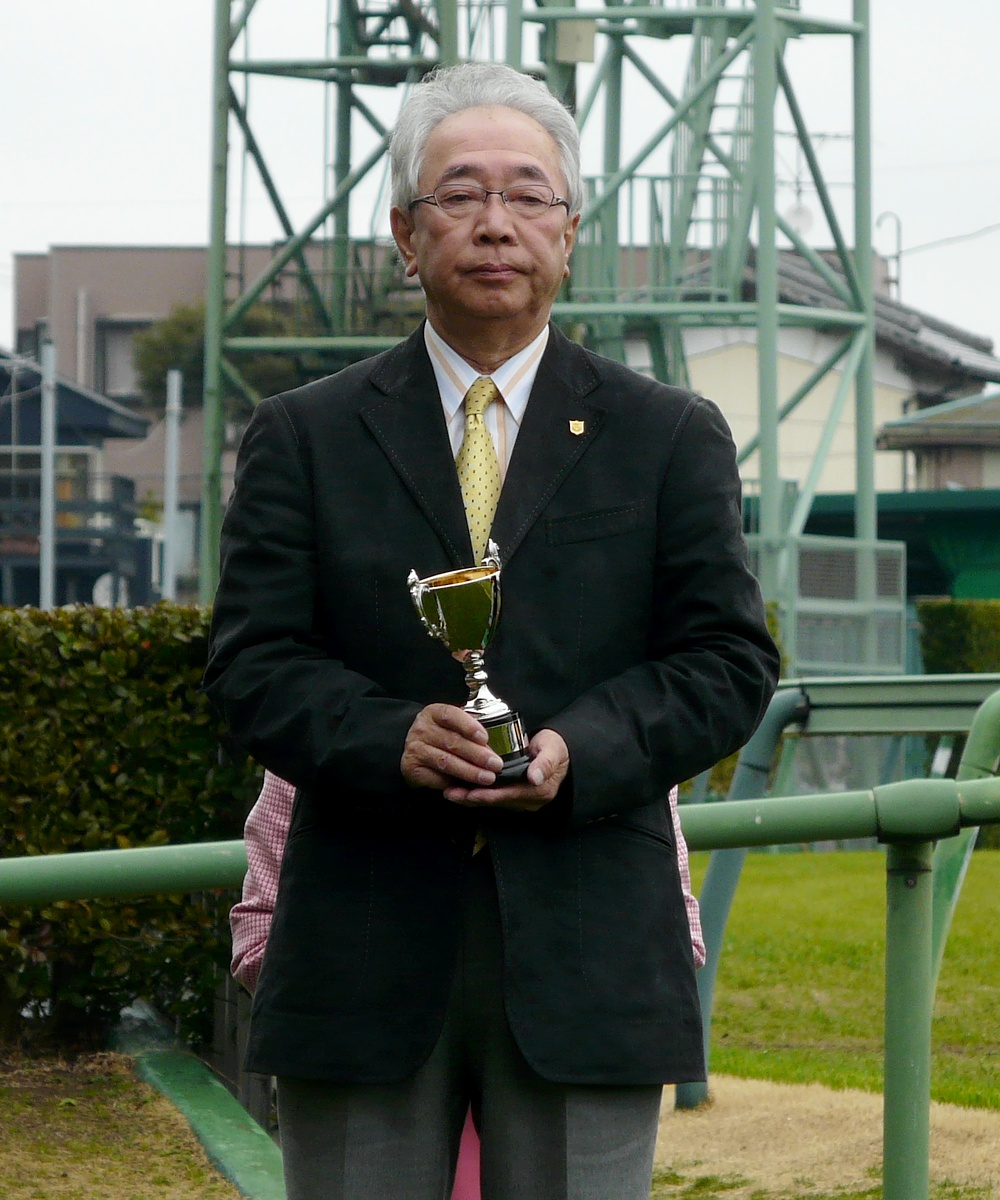
Mitsuhiro Ogata, who trained Grass Wonder throughout his racing career

Grass Wonder began his third season in the Grade II Keio Hai Spring Cup over 1400 metres at Tokyo on 15 May. He won by three quarters of a length from Air Jihad, to whom he was conceding four pounds. The unplaced horses included Phalaenopsis (Oka Sho, Shuka Sho) and the Godolphin challenger Lend A Hand (Gran Criterium). On 13 June over 1600 metres Grass Wonder faced Air Jihad at level weights in the Yasuda Kinen. He was beaten a nose by his rival with the pair finishing two and a half lengths clear of Seeking the Pearl (Prix Maurice de Gheest) in third place. Grass Wonder returned to middle distances for the Takarazuka Kinen over 2200 metres at Hanshin Racecourse on 11 July and was matched for the first time against Special Week, a colt who had won the Tokyo Yushun in 1998 and the spring edition of the Tenno Sho. The other runners included Matikanefukukitaru and Stay Gold. Grass Wonder defeated Special Week with a gap of seven lengths back to Stay Gold in third.

After a break of almost three months, Grass Wonder returned for the Grade II Mainichi Okan over 1800 metres at Tokyo on 10 October and won from Meisho Odo and Embrasser Moi. On 26 December at Nakayama, Grass Wonder attempted to become the fourth horse following Speed Symboli, Symboli Rudolf and Oguri Cap to win back-to-back runnings of the Arima Kinen, and the sixth horse following Ryu Forel, Shinzan, Speed Symboli Inari One and Mejiro Palmer to win both of Japan's all-star Grand Prix races in the same year, the other being the Takarazuka Kinen. His main opponents in the fourteen runner field included Mejiro Bright, Narita Top Road, Phalaenopsis, Special Week, Stay Gold, Symboli Indy (NHK Mile Cup) and T. M. Opera O (Satsuki Sho). The race produced a dramatic finish with the lead changing hand several times in the last 200 metres, but Grass Wonder prevailed by a nose and a neck from Special Week and T. M. Opera O with Tsurumaru Tsuyoshi half a length away in fourth.

For his efforts over the course of the season, Grass Wonder was given a special award at the JRA Awards for 1999.

=== 2000: five-year-old season ===
Grass Wonder remained in training as a five-year-old colt but failed to reproduce his best form. He finished sixth behind Leo Ryuho in the Grade II Nikkei Sho over 2500 metres at Nakayama on 26 March and then ran unplaced behind the filly Stinger in the Keio Hai Spring Cup. In his final race the horse ran for the second time in the Takarazuka Kinen and finished sixth of the eleven runners behind T. M. Opera O.

== Retirement and stud record ==
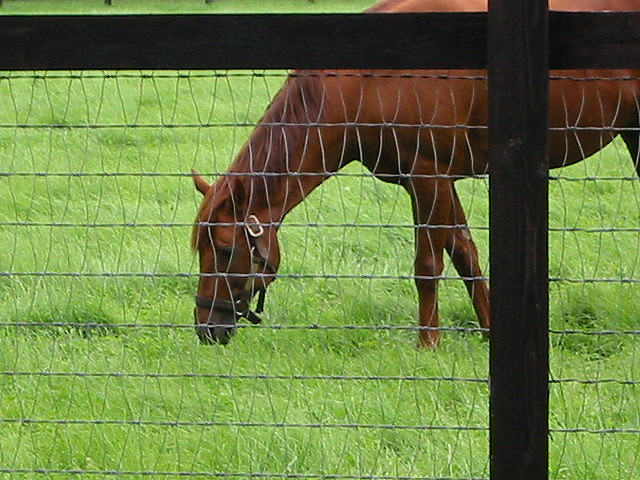
Grass Wonder in retirement, 2002

Grass Wonder was retired from racing to stand at the Shadai Stallion Station in Hokkaido. He later moved to the Breeders' Stallion Station where he was based in 2015.

=== Notable progeny ===
c = colt, f = filly, g = gelding
bold: GI/JpnI grade winners

Grade winners
**Foaled**	**Name**	**Sex**	**Major Wins**
2002	Felicia	f	Fairy Stakes
2002	Maruka Rascal	c	**Nakayama Grand Jump, Nakayama Daishogai**
2002	Osumi Grass One	c	Niigata Daishoten (2x)
2003	Meiner Scherzi	c	Kyoto Kimpai, New Zealand Trophy
2003	Sakura Mega Wonder	c	Radio Tampa Hai Nisai Stakes, Naruo Kinen (2x), Kinko Sho
2004	Meiner Rainier	c	Keio Hai Nisai Stakes, Swan Stakes
2004	Screen Hero	c	Copa Republica Argentina, **Japan Cup**
2005	Earnestly	c	Chunichi Shimbun Hai, Kinko Sho, Sapporo Kinen, Sankei Sho All Comers, **Takarazuka Kinen**
2006	Seiun Wonder	c	Niigata Nisai Stakes, Epsom Cup, **Asahi Hai Futurity Stakes**
2007	Cosmo Helenos	c	Stayers Stakes
2007	Meisho Kampaku	c	Kyoto Daishoten
2008	Big Romance	c	**Zen-Nippon Nisai Yushun**
2008	Shigeru Juyaku	c	Niigata Jump Stakes, Hanshin Spring Jump
2010	Smart Orion	g	Ocean Stakes, Chukyo Kinen

== Death ==
Grass Wonder died at Big Red Farm on 8 August 2025, after suffering multiple organ failures linked to old age. He was 30.

== In popular culture ==
An anthropomorphized version of Grass Wonder appears as a character in the Japanese multimedia franchise Umamusume: Pretty Derby, voiced by Rena Maeda. She is depicted as a calm and gentle North American exchange student who aspires to become the ideal Yamato nadeshiko. She has a deep fascination for Japanese culture, which can be seen by her wielding a naginata in the mobile game adaptation. However, her graceful and friendly facade hides an aggressive, no-nonsense, and highly competitive nature. Her career mode in the video game and role in the anime take inspiration from her real-life counterpart's racing career, such as her rivalry with Special Week and comparisons to her upperclassman Maruzensky. Phillips was unfamiliar with Umamusume, whereas Maeda is a horse racing fan who visited the real Grass Wonder in 2018.

== Racing form ==
The following racing form is based on information available on JBIS Search and netkeiba.com

Date	Age	Distance (Condition)	Race	Class	Course	Field	HN	Odds (Favored)	Finish	Time	Winning (Losing) Margin	Jockey	Winner (2nd Place)	Ref
Sep 13, 1997	2	Turf 1800 m (Firm)	Two Year Old Debut		Nakayama	10	9	1.5 (1)	1st	1:52.4	3 lengths	Hitoshi Matoba	(Bildschon)	
Oct 12, 1997	2	Turf 1400 m (Firm)	Ivy Stakes	OP	Tokyo	9	8	1.4 (1)	1st	1:21.9	5 lengths	Hitoshi Matoba	(Machikane Sanshiro)	
Nov 8, 1997	2	Turf 1400 m (Firm)	Keisei Hai Sansai Stakes	GII	Tokyo	9	2	1.1 (1)	1st	1:21.9	6 lengths	Hitoshi Matoba	(Machikane Sanshiro)	
Dec 7, 1997	2	Turf 1600 m (Firm)	Asahi Hai Sansai Stakes	GI	Nakayama	15	11	1.3 (1)	1st	R1:33.6	2 1/2 lengths	Hitoshi Matoba	(Meiner Love)	
Oct 11, 1998	3	Turf 1800 m (Firm)	Mainichi Okan	GII	Tokyo	9	6	3.7 (2)	5th	1:46.4	(8 1/2 lengths)	Hitoshi Matoba	Silence Suzuka	
Nov 7, 1998	3	Turf 2500 m (Firm)	Copa Republica Argentina	GII	Tokyo	18	13	3.0 (1)	6th	2:33.5	(3 1/2 lengths)	Hitoshi Matoba	Yusei Top Run	
Dec 27, 1998	3	Turf 2500 m (Firm)	Arima Kinen	GI	Nakayama	16	2	14.5 (4)	1st	2:32.1	1/2 length	Hitoshi Matoba	(Mejiro Bright)	
May 15, 1999	4	Turf 1400 m (Firm)	Keio Hai Spring Cup	GII	Tokyo	18	5	2.1 (1)	1st	1:20.5	3/4 length	Hitoshi Matoba	(Air Jihad)	
Jun 13, 1999	4	Turf 1600 m (Firm)	Yasuda Kinen	GI	Tokyo	14	7	1.3 (1)	2nd	1:33.3	(nose)	Hitoshi Matoba	Air Jihad	
Jul 11, 1999	4	Turf 2200 m (Firm)	Takarazuka Kinen	GI	Hanshin	12	5	2.8 (2)	1st	2:12.1	3 lengths	Hitoshi Matoba	(Special Week)	
Oct 10, 1999	4	Turf 1800 m (Firm)	Mainichi Okan	GII	Tokyo	10	8	1.2 (1)	1st	1:45.8	nose	Hitoshi Matoba	(Meisho Odo)	
Dec 26, 1999	4	Turf 2500 m (Firm)	Arima Kinen	GI	Nakayama	14	7	2.8 (1)	1st	2:37.2	nose	Hitoshi Matoba	(Special Week)	
Mar 26, 2000	5	Turf 2500 m (Firm)	Nikkei Sho	GII	Nakayama	10	7	1.3 (1)	6th	2:36.3	(6 lengths)	Hitoshi Matoba	Leo Ryuho	
May 14, 2000	5	Turf 1400 m (Firm)	Keio Hai Spring Cup	GII	Tokyo	18	8	2.4 (1)	9th	1:21.6	(4 1/2 lengths)	Hitoshi Matoba	Stinger	
Jun 25, 2000	5	Turf 2200 m (Firm)	Takarazuka Kinen	GI	Hanshin	11	11	2.8 (2)	6th	2:14.7	(5 3/4 lengths)	Masayoshi Ebina	T. M. Opera O	

- R on the time indicates that this was a record time

== Pedigree ==
Pedigree of Grass Wonder (USA), chestnut stallion, 1995
Sire Silver Hawk (USA) 1979	Roberto (USA); 1969	Hail To Reason	Turn-To
Sire Silver Hawk (USA) 1979	Roberto (USA); 1969	Hail To Reason	Nothirdchance
Sire Silver Hawk (USA) 1979	Roberto (USA); 1969	Bramalea	Nashua
Sire Silver Hawk (USA) 1979	Roberto (USA); 1969	Bramalea	Rarelea
Sire Silver Hawk (USA) 1979	Gris Vitesse (USA); 1966	Amerigo	Nearco
Sire Silver Hawk (USA) 1979	Gris Vitesse (USA); 1966	Amerigo	Sanlinea
Sire Silver Hawk (USA) 1979	Gris Vitesse (USA); 1966	Matchiche	Mat de Cocagne
Sire Silver Hawk (USA) 1979	Gris Vitesse (USA); 1966	Matchiche	Chimere Fabuleuse
Dam Ameriflora (USA) 1989	Danzig (USA); 1977	Northern Dancer	Nearctic
Dam Ameriflora (USA) 1989	Danzig (USA); 1977	Northern Dancer	Natalma
Dam Ameriflora (USA) 1989	Danzig (USA); 1977	Pas de Nom	Admiral's Voyage
Dam Ameriflora (USA) 1989	Danzig (USA); 1977	Pas de Nom	Petitioner
Dam Ameriflora (USA) 1989	Graceful Touch (USA); 1978	His Majesty	Ribot
Dam Ameriflora (USA) 1989	Graceful Touch (USA); 1978	His Majesty	Flower Bowl
Dam Ameriflora (USA) 1989	Graceful Touch (USA); 1978	Pi Phi Girl	Raise a Native
Dam Ameriflora (USA) 1989	Graceful Touch (USA); 1978	Pi Phi Girl	Soaring (Family 12-c)
