= Narita Top Road =

Japanese thoroughbred racehorse

Narita Top Road ナリタトップロード
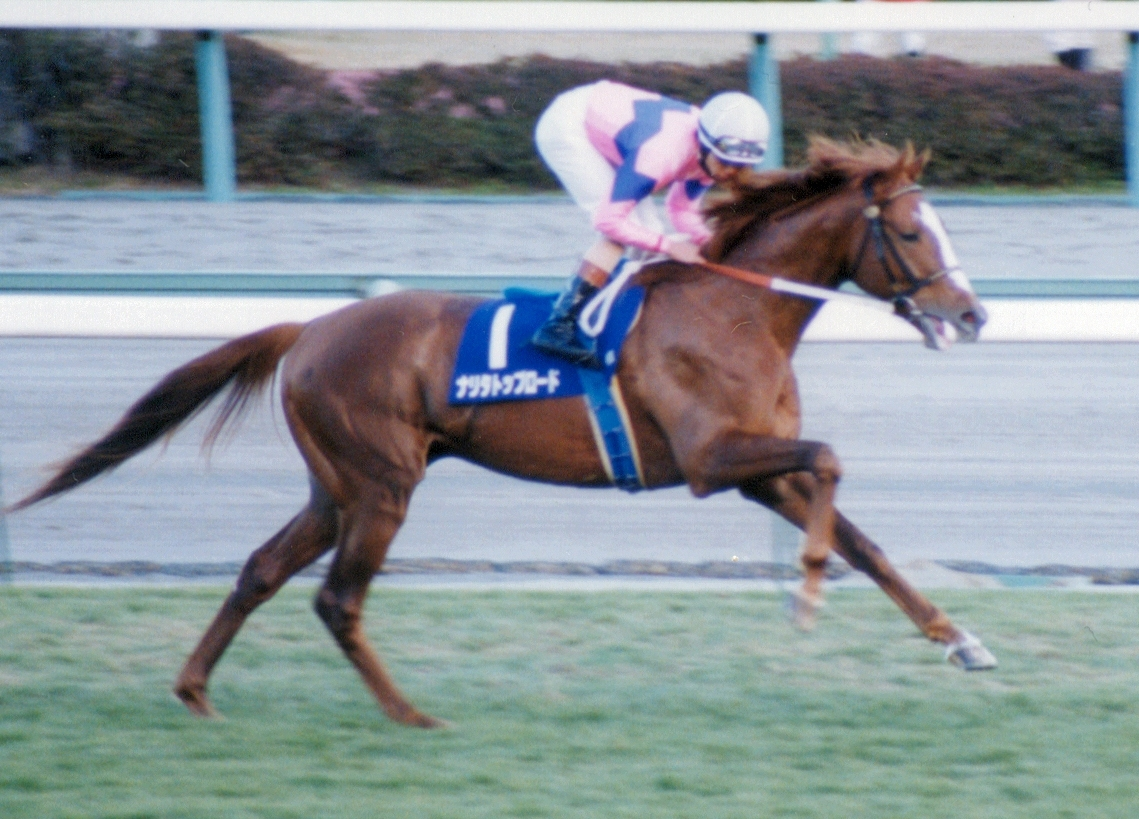
- Narita Top Road at the 1999 Arima Kinen.
- Breed: Thoroughbred
- Sire: Soccer Boy
- Grandsire: Dictus
- Dam: Floral Magic
- Damsire: Affirmed
- Sex: Stallion
- Foaled: April 4, 1996
- Died: November 7, 2005 (aged 9)
- Country: Japan
- Color: Chestnut
- Breeder: Sasaki Bokujo
- Owner: Hidenori Yamaji
- Racing colors
- Trainer: Hideo Oki
- Jockey: Kunihiko Watanabe
- Record: 30: 8–6–8
- Earnings: ¥990,112,000

Major wins
- Kisaragi Sho (1999); Yayoi Sho (1999); Hanshin Daishoten (2001, 2002); Kyoto Kinen (2002); Kyoto Daishoten (2002); Japanese Classic Race wins: Kikuka-shō (1999)

Narita Top Road (Japanese: ナリタトップロード, Hepburn: Narita Toppu Rōdo; April 4, 1996 - November 7, 2005) was a Japanese Thoroughbred racehorse and sire that competed from 1998 to 2002. Considered one of the top three of his generation due to the intense 1999 Classic showdowns alongside T. M. Opera O and Admire Vega, in which he finished on podiums in all three legs. He was the winner of the Kikuka Shō in 1999.

He never won another G1 race after the Kikuka Sho. Still, he frequently finished on podiums or in the top five for the rest of his career. Due to his relentless effort and long-standing tenure, Narita Top Road was described as a "supporting lead that always chased his rivals" by the fans and racing associations alike.

== Racing career ==
=== 1998: two-year-old season ===
Narita Top Road ran his maiden race at the Hanshin Racecourse on December 5, where he finished second behind Meiner Success. Later that month, he won his first race at another maiden race at Hanshin.

=== 1999: three-year-old season ===
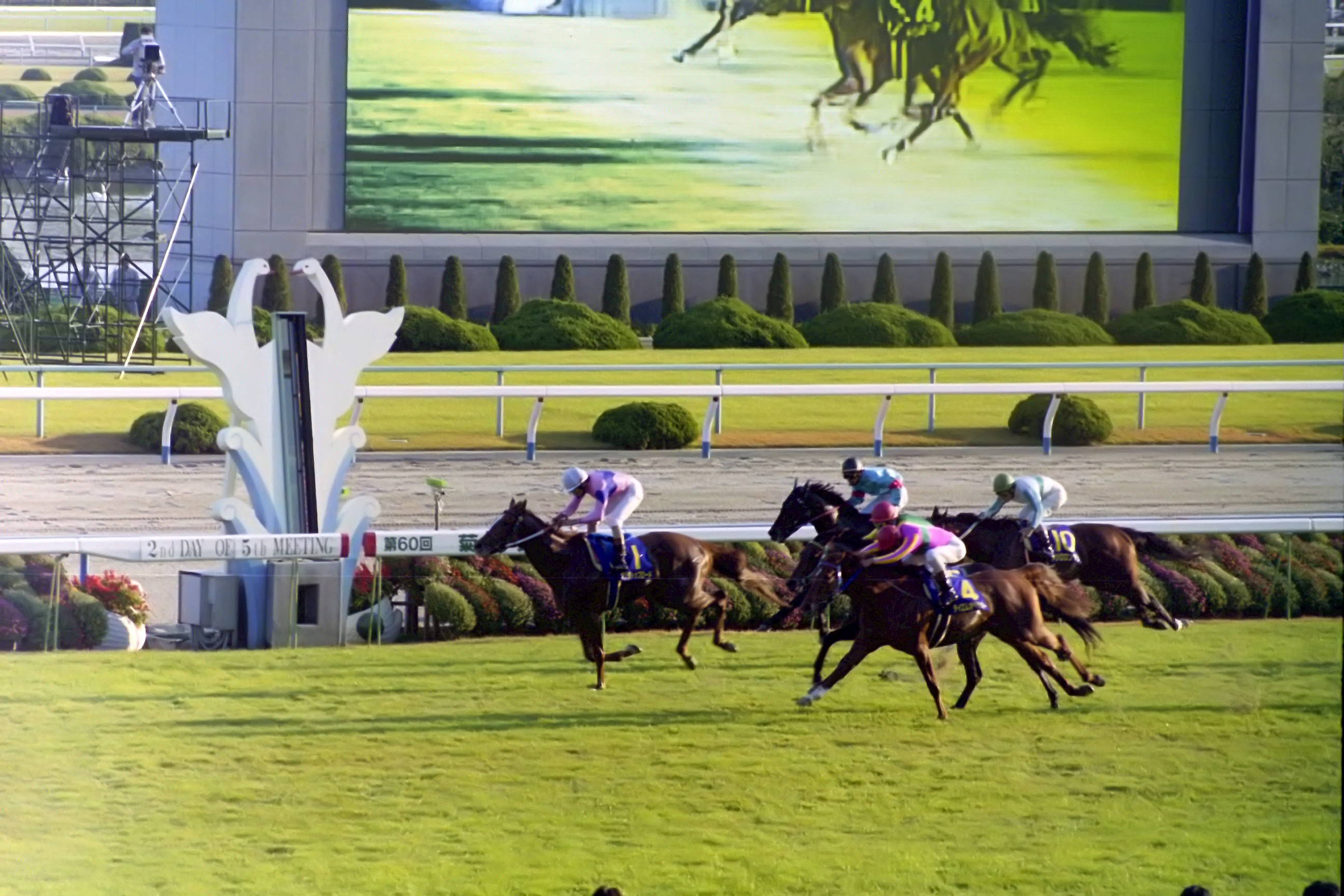
Narita Top Road winning the Kikuka-shō

Narita Top Road won his first graded race when he won that year's Kisaragi Sho. The horse then went on to the Yayoi Sho, where he beat Admire Vega. He was then entered into the Satsuki Sho, where he finished third behind T. M. Opera O and Osumi Bright. The horse also ran in the Tokyo Yushun, where he finished second behind Admire Vega.

After taking the summer off, the horse once again finished second behind Admire Vega at the Kyoto Shimbun Hai. Later, at the Kikuka-shō, the horse took the fourth position in the pack before taking the lead at the fourth corner. Narita Top Road held on to the lead from there and won the race, even as T. M. Opera O closed the gap. After winning the Kikuka-shō, he was entered into that year's Arima Kinen but finished 7th.

=== 2000: four-year-old season ===
Narita Top Road started the season off with the Kyoto Kinen, where he finished second behind T. M. Opera O; and later to the Hanshin Daishoten and Tenno Sho (Spring), in both of which the horse finished third behind T. M. Opera O and Rascal Suzuka. After a summer break, the horse was entered into the Kyoto Daishoten, where he finished second behind T. M. Opera O and finished 5th at the Tenno Sho (Autumn). After finishing 4th at the Stayers Stakes, Kunihiko Watanabe, who had been the horse's jockey up to this point, resigned from the position, and the role went to Hitoshi Matoba. However, the horse could not win the Arima Kinen, which was the horse's next race.

=== 2001: five-year-old season ===
Narita Top Road started the season with the Kyoto Kinen, but finished third behind Maquereau. As Matoba retired around this time, Watanabe returned to jockey duty for the Hanshin Daishoten. Narita Top Road won the race with a course record of 3:02.5.

Later that year, the horse ran in the Kyoto Daishoten. However, the horse did not finish the race as Stay Gold made physical contact with the horse, causing Watanabe to fall off and injuring both the horse and jockey. Subsequently, Stay Gold was disqualified as a result of this incident.

=== 2002: six-year-old season ===
Narita Top Road once again started the season with the Kyoto Kinen, where he managed to win the race after being nearly beaten by Matikane Kinnohosi. He was then entered into the Hanshin Daishoten, where he easily beat Jungle Pocket. However, he finished third behind Manhattan Cafe and Jungle Pocket later at the Tenno Sho (Spring).

Following this race, the horse spent the summer off, returning victoriously at the Kyoto Daishoten, but was unable to secure a single victory until his retirement at the Arima Kinen that year.

== Stud career ==
Following his retirement, Narita Top Road stood stud at the Shadai Stallion Station. His most successful progeny was Bella Rheia, who won the Flora Stakes and finished second in the Yushun Himba in 2007.

Narita Top Road died from a heart failure on November 7, 2005, six years to the day after his Kikuka-shō win. He had been recovering from a bladder stone surgery at the time.

== In popular culture ==
An anthropomorphized version of Narita Top Road appears as a character in the Japanese multimedia franchise Uma Musume Pretty Derby, voiced by Kanna Nakamura, with the horse being the featured character in the anime Uma Musume Pretty Derby: Road to the Top. In the game, she is a Mob Umamusume in the scenario Trackblazer: Start Of The Climax.

== Racing form ==
The following form is based on information available on JBIS Search and netkeiba.

Date	Track	Race	Grade	Distance (condition)	Entry	HN	Odds (favored)	Finish	Time	Margin	Jockey	Winner (Runner-up)
1998 – two-year-old season
Dec 5	Hanshin	3yo Newcomer		2000m (good)	11	9	2.6 (1st)	2nd	2:06.2	0.0	Kunihiko Watanabe	Meiner Success
Dec 27	Hanshin	3yo Newcomer		2000m (firm)	13	12	1.9 (1st)	1st	2:04.0	-0.2	Kunihiko Watanabe	(Miracle Gift)
1999 – three-year-old season
Jan 10	Kyoto	Fukujuso Tokubetsu	1 Win	2000m (firm)	15	8	4.5 (3rd)	3rd	2:02.3	0.4	Kunihiko Watanabe	Thrilling Sunday
Feb 7	Kyoto	Kisaragi Sho	GIII	1800m (firm)	15	5	4.6 (2nd)	1st	1:49.1	0.0	Kunihiko Watanabe	(Eishin Cameron)
Mar 7	Nakayama	Yayoi Sho	GII	2000m (good)	15	12	4.0 (2nd)	1st	2:03.5	-0.2	Kunihiko Watanabe	(Admire Vega)
Apr 18	Nakayama	Satsuki Sho	GI	2000m (firm)	17	8	3.3 (2nd)	3rd	2:00.7	0.0	Kunihiko Watanabe	T. M. Opera O
June 6	Tokyo	Tokyo Yushun	GI	2400m (firm)	18	11	3.9 (1st)	2nd	2:25.4	0.1	Kunihiko Watanabe	Admire Vega
Oct 17	Kyoto	Kyoto Shimbun Hai	GII	2200m (firm)	18	8	2.8 (1st)	2nd	2:12.3	0.0	Kunihiko Watanabe	Admire Vega
Nov 7	Kyoto	Kikuka-shō	GI	3000m (firm)	15	1	4.1 (3rd)	1st	3:07.6	-0.1	Kunihiko Watanabe	(T. M. Opera O)
Dec 26	Nakayama	Arima Kinen	GI	2500m (firm)	14	1	6.8 (4th)	7th	2:37.8	0.6	Kunihiko Watanabe	Grass Wonder
2000 – four-year-old season
Feb 20	Kyoto	Kyoto Kinen	GII	2200m (firm)	11	9	2.6 (2nd)	2nd	2:13.8	0.0	Kunihiko Watanabe	T. M. Opera O
Mar 19	Hanshin	Hanshin Daishoten	GII	3000m (good)	9	5	2.9 (3rd)	3rd	3:09.8	0.4	Kunihiko Watanabe	T. M. Opera O
Apr 30	Kyoto	Tenno Sho (Spring)	GI	3200m (firm)	12	11	3.5 (2nd)	3rd	3:17.8	0.2	Kunihiko Watanabe	T. M. Opera O
Oct 8	Kyoto	Kyoto Daishoten	GII	2400m (firm)	12	10	2.6 (2nd)	2nd	2:26.0	0.0	Kunihiko Watanabe	T. M. Opera O
Oct 29	Tokyo	Tenno Sho (Autumn)	GI	2000m (soft)	16	3	4.9 (3rd)	5th	2:00.5	0.9	Kunihiko Watanabe	T. M. Opera O
Dec 2	Nakayama	Stayers Stakes	GII	3600m (firm)	11	3	1.3 (1st)	4th	3:45.9	0.3	Kunihiko Watanabe	Hot Secret
Dec 24	Nakayama	Arima Kinen	GI	2500m (firm)	16	4	7.6 (3rd)	9th	2:35.1	1.0	Hitoshi Matoba	T. M. Opera O
2001 – five-year-old season
Feb 17	Kyoto	Kyoto Kinen	GII	2200m (firm)	14	11	2.3 (1st)	3rd	2:12.5	0.2	Hitoshi Matoba	Maquereau
Mar 18	Hanshin	Hanshin Daishoten	GII	3000m (good)	12	3	2.5 (1st)	1st	R3:02.5	-1.3	Kunihiko Watanabe	(Erimo Brian)
Apr 29	Kyoto	Tenno Sho (Spring)	GI	3200m (firm)	12	12	3.4 (2nd)	3rd	3:16.4	0.2	Kunihiko Watanabe	T. M. Opera O
Oct 8	Kyoto	Kyoto Daishoten	GII	2400m (firm)	7	4	2.4 (2nd)	DNF			Kunihiko Watanabe	T. M. Opera O
Nov 25	Tokyo	Japan Cup	GI	2400m (firm)	15	10	14.4 (5th)	3rd	2:24.4	0.6	Kunihiko Watanabe	Jungle Pocket
Dec 23	Nakayama	Arima Kinen	GI	2500m (firm)	13	4	7.5 (4th)	10th	2:33.9	0.8	Kunihiko Watanabe	Manhattan Cafe
2002 – six-year-old season
Feb 16	Kyoto	Kyoto Kinen	GII	2200m (firm)	9	9	5.1 (3rd)	1st	2:11.8	0.0	Kunihiko Watanabe	(Matikane Kinnohosi)
Mar 17	Hanshin	Hanshin Daishoten	GII	3000m (good)	9	4	1.9 (1st)	1st	3:07.9	-0.3	Kunihiko Watanabe	(Jungle Pocket)
Apr 28	Kyoto	Tenno Sho (Spring)	GI	3200m (firm)	11	5	2.7 (1st)	3rd	3:19.6	0.1	Kunihiko Watanabe	Manhattan Cafe
Oct 6	Kyoto	Kyoto Daishoten	GII	2400m (firm)	8	1	1.7 (1st)	1st	2:23.6	-0.4	Hirofumi Shii	(Tsurumaru Boy)
Oct 27	Nakayama	Tenno Sho (Autumn)	GI	2000m (firm)	18	1	4.9 (2nd)	2nd	1:58.6	0.1	Hirofumi Shii	Symboli Kris S
Nov 24	Nakayama	Japan Cup	GI	2200m (firm)	16	13	3.9 (2nd)	10th	2:13.1	0.9	Hirofumi Shii	Falbrav
Dec 22	Nakayama	Arima Kinen	GI	2500m (good)	14	11	10.6 (4th)	4th	2:33.4	0.8	Kunihiko Watanabe	Symboli Kris S

Legend:
Turf

== Pedigree ==
Pedigree of Narita Top Road
Sire Soccer Boy 1985 d.ch.	Dictus; 1967 ch.	Sanctus	Fine Top
Sire Soccer Boy 1985 d.ch.	Dictus; 1967 ch.	Sanctus	Sanelta
Sire Soccer Boy 1985 d.ch.	Dictus; 1967 ch.	Doronic	Worden
Sire Soccer Boy 1985 d.ch.	Dictus; 1967 ch.	Doronic	Dulzetta
Sire Soccer Boy 1985 d.ch.	Dyna Sash; 1979 b.	Northern Taste	Northern Dancer
Sire Soccer Boy 1985 d.ch.	Dyna Sash; 1979 b.	Northern Taste	Lady Victoria
Sire Soccer Boy 1985 d.ch.	Dyna Sash; 1979 b.	Royal Sash	Princely Gift
Sire Soccer Boy 1985 d.ch.	Dyna Sash; 1979 b.	Royal Sash	Sash of Honour
Dam Floral Magic 1985 dk.b.	Affirmed; 1975 ch.	Exclusive Native	Raise a Native
Dam Floral Magic 1985 dk.b.	Affirmed; 1975 ch.	Exclusive Native	Exclusive
Dam Floral Magic 1985 dk.b.	Affirmed; 1975 ch.	Won't Tell You	Crafty Admiral
Dam Floral Magic 1985 dk.b.	Affirmed; 1975 ch.	Won't Tell You	Scarlet Ribbon
Dam Floral Magic 1985 dk.b.	Rare Lady; 1974 dk.b.	Never Bend	Nasrullah
Dam Floral Magic 1985 dk.b.	Rare Lady; 1974 dk.b.	Never Bend	Lalun
Dam Floral Magic 1985 dk.b.	Rare Lady; 1974 dk.b.	Double Agent	Double Jay
Dam Floral Magic 1985 dk.b.	Rare Lady; 1974 dk.b.	Double Agent	Conniver

== See also ==
- Narita Brian, another racehorse owned by Hidenori Yamaji
