= Shadai Stallion Station =

Thoroughbred breeding facility in Abira, Hokkaidō, Japan

Coordinates: 42°42′57″N 141°49′26″E

Map

Shadai Stallion Station (社台スタリオンステーション, Shadai Sutarion Sutēshon) is a thoroughbred breeding facility located in Abira on the island of Hokkaido in Japan. The farm was begun in the late 1970s to early 1980s by the late Zenya Yoshida, and is now run jointly by his sons (Katsumi, Haruya, and Teruya Yoshida), known collectively as the Shadai Group. As of 2006, the brothers own 3,000 horses worldwide. The farm houses stallions from Japan and many other countries and racing circuits. The grounds also house a racing museum and tourist park called the Northern Horse Park and the Northern Farm Kuko, a large horse-training and conditioning facility. The most expensive acquisition was War Emblem, which was bought for US$17 million in 2002 to replace Sunday Silence, whom died in August of that year from laminitis (and whose offspring are most notable among the stable's horses today). War Emblem was a reluctant breeder, siring only 106 registered foals between 2004 and 2011. He did not sire a foal after 2012, and was pensioned and returned to the United States in the fall of 2015 to Old Friends Equine. Other recent acquisitions include 2010 King George VI and Queen Elizabeth Stakes winner Harbinger and 2010 Epsom Derby and Prix de l'Arc de Triomphe winner Workforce.

== Current stallions ==
The below list is based on the official stud list for the 2026 season as of February 2026:

- Admire Mars
- Bellagio Opera
- Bricks and Mortar
- Chrysoberyl
- Contrail
- Danon Kingly
- Do Deuce
- Drefong
- Efforia
- Epiphaneia
- Equinox
- Grenadier Guards
- Hot Rod Charlie
- Isla Bonita
- Kitasan Black
- Kizuna
- Le Vent Se Leve
- Lord Kanaloa
- Maurice
- Mind Your Biscuits
- Nadal
- Orfevre
- Poetic Flare
- Rey de Oro
- Rulership
- Salios
- Satono Crown
- Saturnalia
- Schnell Meister
- Shahryar
- Siskin
- Suave Richard

== Past stallions ==
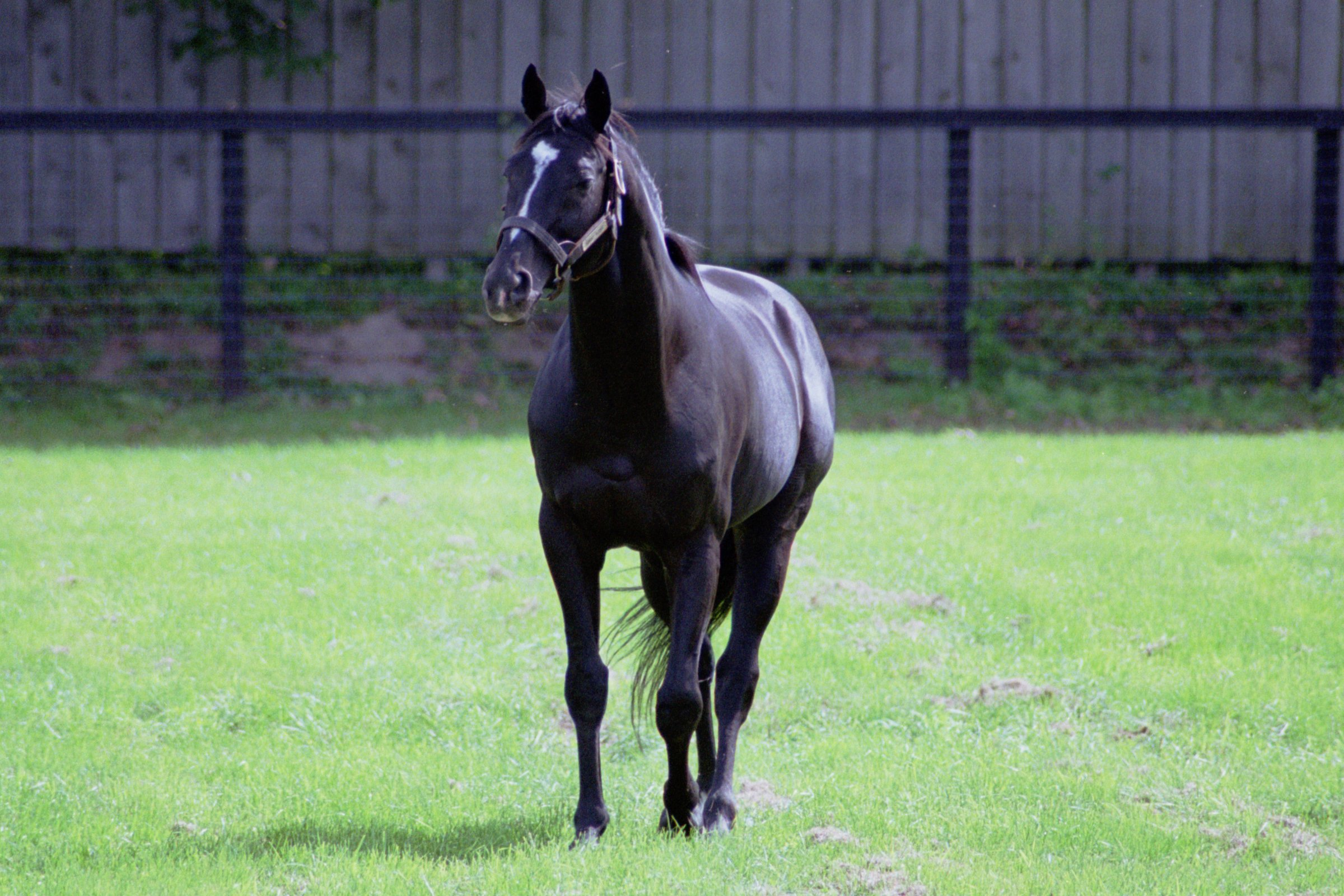
Sunday Silence

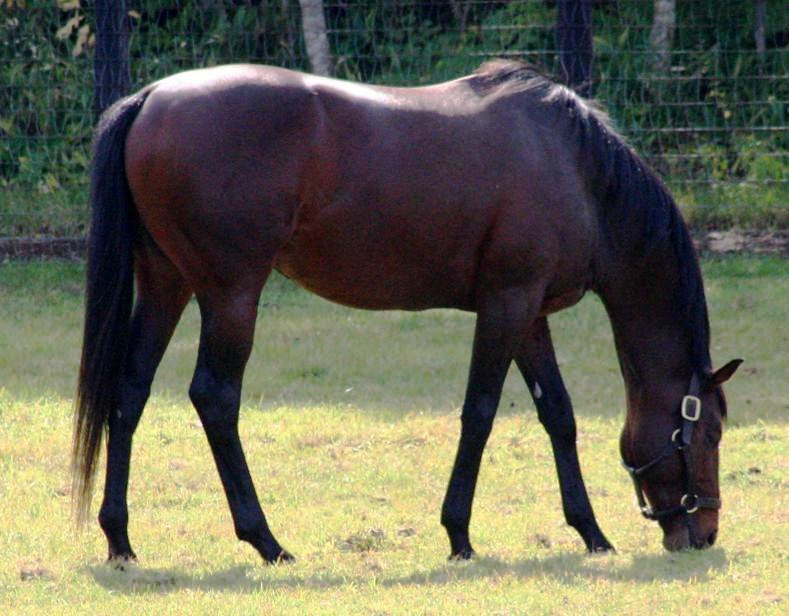
King Kamehameha

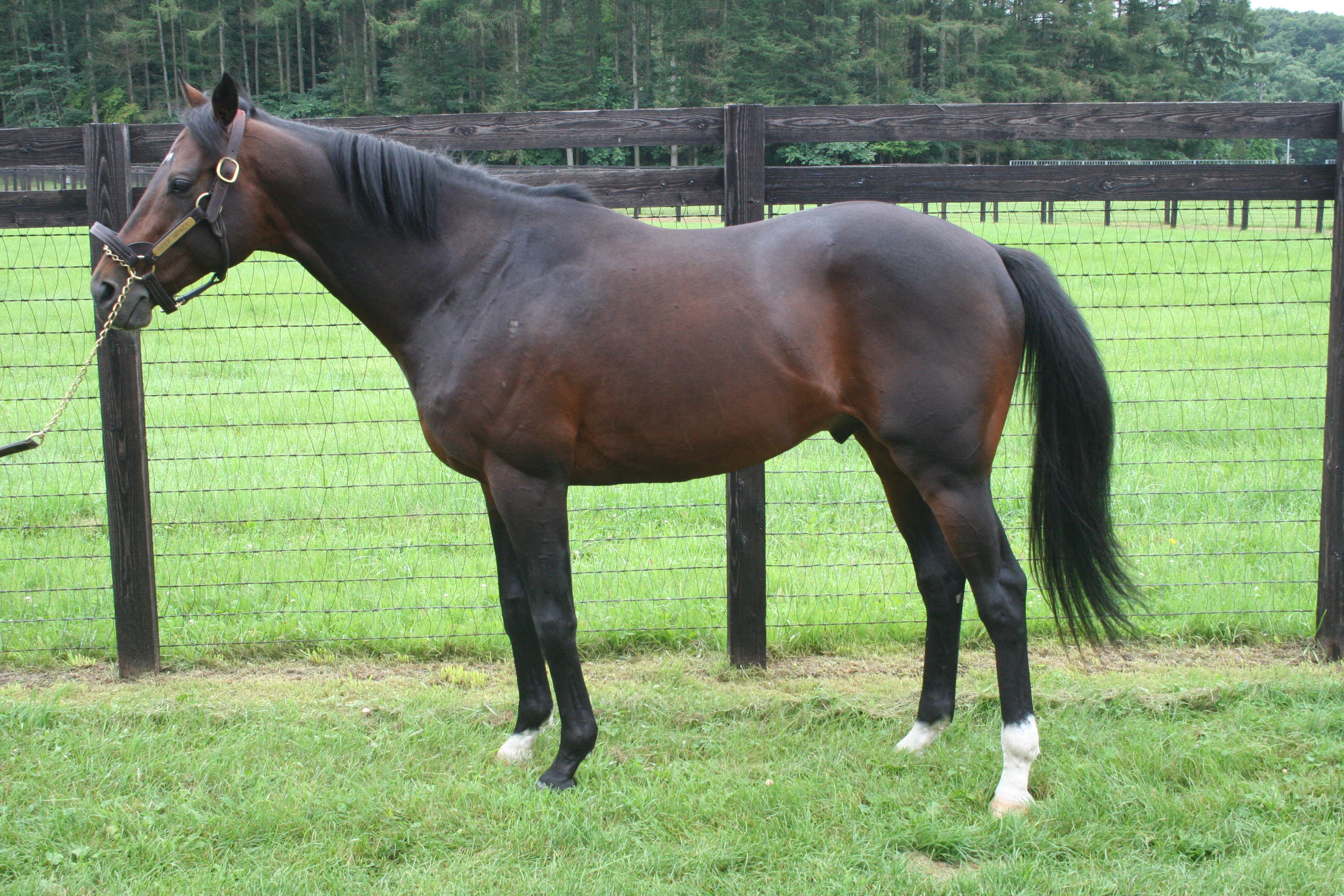
Deep Impact

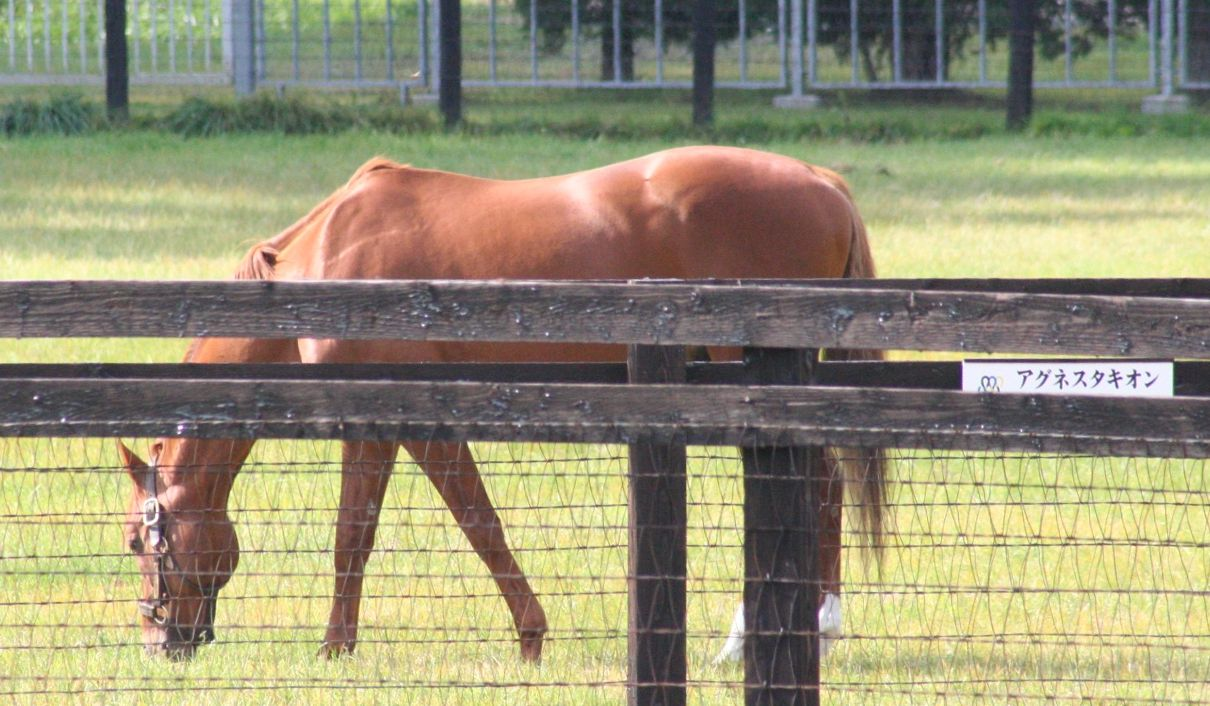
Agnes Tachyon

- Admire Cozzene
- Admire Don
- Admire Main
- Admire Jupiter
- Admire Vega
- Agnes Tachyon
- Agnes World
- Air Jihad
- Allez Milord
- Bachir
- Baronnet Turf
- Battle Line
- Belshazzar
- Best Tie Up
- Bubble Gum Fellow
- Captain Thule
- Carnegie
- Carroll House
- Casino Drive
- Chichicastenango
- Daiwa Major
- Dance in the Dark
- Danon Chantilly
- Deep Brillante
- Deep Impact
- Divine Light
- Dr Devious
- Dream Journey
- Dream Well
- Duramente
- Durandal
- Dynamite Daddy
- Eishin Flash
- El Condor Pasa
- End Sweep
- Falbrav
- French Deputy
- Fuji Kiseki
- Fenomeno
- Gallop Dyna
- Genuine
- Gold Allure
- Golden Pheasant
- Grass Wonder
- Groom Dancer
- Harbinger
- Heart Lake
- Heart's Cry
- Hector Protector
- Helissio
- Jade Robbery
- Judge Angelucci
- Jungle Pocket
- Just A Way
- King Kamehameha
- Kinshasa no Kiseki
- Kurofune
- Lassalle
- Lincoln
- Logotype
- Lohengrin
- Manhattan Cafe
- Meisho Samson
- Mejiro McQueen
- Mikki Isle
- Mr. C. B.
- Music Time
- Narita Top Road
- Neo Universe
- New Year's Day
- Nichido Arashi
- Northern Taste
- Novellist
- On Fire
- Pentire
- Reach the Crown
- Real Impact
- Real Shadai
- Real Steel
- Red Falx
- Rosado
- Satono Aladdin
- Satono Diamond
- Sakura Bakushin O
- Six Sense
- Ski Captain
- Slew O'Dyna
- Smart Falcon
- Soccer Boy
- Song of Wind
- Special Week
- Summer Suspicion
- Sunday Silence
- Swept Overboard
- Symboli Kris S
- Tanino Gimlet
- Tayasu Tsuyoshi
- That's the Plenty
- Thrill Show
- Timber Country
- Tokai Teio
- Tony Bin
- Turtle Bowl
- Twining
- Vermillion
- Victoire Pisa
- Victory
- War Emblem
- White Muzzle
- Workforce
- Zenno Rob Roy

== Cemetery ==
The graves of several past stallions, such as Northern Taste, Sunday Silence, Deep Impact, and King Kamehameha, are located on the hills within the property.
