= Stay Gold (horse) =

Japanese-bred Thoroughbred racehorse

Stay Gold ステイゴールド
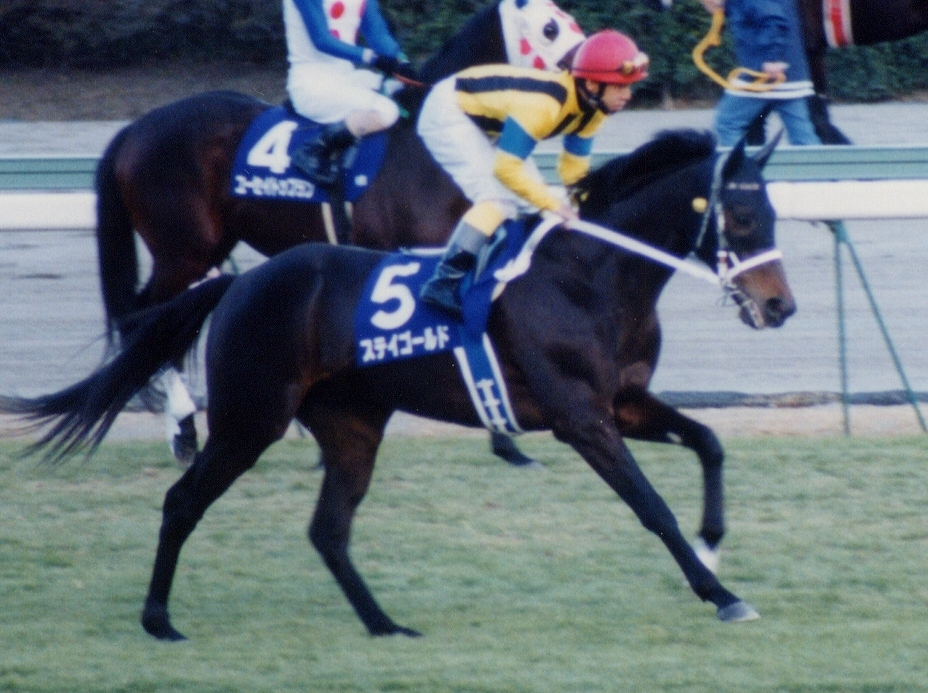
- Stay Gold on December 26, 1999, at Nakayama Racecourse.
- Breed: Thoroughbred
- Sire: Sunday Silence (USA)
- Grandsire: Halo (USA)
- Dam: Golden Sash (JPN)
- Damsire: Dictus (FR)
- Sex: Stallion
- Foaled: March 24, 1994
- Died: February 5, 2015 (aged 20)
- Country: Japan
- Colour: Seal brown
- Breeder: Shiraoi Farm
- Owner: Shadai Racehorse Co.
- Racing colours
- Trainer: Yasuo Ikee
- Jockey: Yutaka Take
- Record: 50: 7-12-8
- Earnings: ¥1,037,473,000

Major wins
- Meguro Kinen (2000); Nikkei Shinshun Hai (2001); Dubai Sheema Classic (2001); Hong Kong Vase (2001)

Awards
- JRA Special Award (2001)

Stay Gold (Japanese: ステイゴールド, Hepburn: Sutei Gōrudo; March 24, 1994 – February 5, 2015) was a Japanese Thoroughbred racehorse and multiple graded stakes winner. Racing 50 times in five years, Stay Gold raced often in Grade 1 (G1) races, but was known as a "Silver Collector", as he often placed second or lower rather than win.

In his final race, the 2001 Hong Kong Vase, Stay Gold was finally able to achieve a G1 victory through a narrow win over the Godolphin-trained horse Ekraar. Due to his victory here and his earlier win over another Godolphin stable horse Fantastic Light at the 2001 Dubai Sheema Classic, he earned the nickname "Godolphin Killer".

Through his victory at the Hong Kong Vase, Stay Gold was the first Japanese–bred horse to win a G1 race outside of Japan. He became a very successful sire in Japan after his retirement from racing, including siring the Triple Crown racehorse Orfevre.

== Background ==
Stay Gold was bred at the Shadai Group's Shiraoi Farm in Shiraoi, Hokkaido. He was sired by Sunday Silence and was out of the mare Golden Sash, a daughter of Dictus. He was notable for being a very small horse, standing 15.3 hands (160 cm) tall at maturity, and weighing a maximum of 436 kilograms (961 lb) during his racing career. One of his defining traits other than his rather small physical stature was his personality - Stay Gold was a particularly violent and bad mannered horse, with his trainer Yasutoshi Ikee remarking that "he was so violent, he might even eat meat if I gave it to him," and his jockey Shigefumi Kumazawa saying that Stay Gold would rear, kick and bite even during regular exercise.

== Racing career ==
Stay Gold made his racing debut at Hanshin Racecourse on December 1, 1996, and won his first race, a 4 year-old maiden race on May 11, 1997. He would then go on to win 2 more races, the latter of which being the "Lake Akan-ko special (阿寒湖特別)" on September 6, 1997. He would not win another race for approximately two years and eight months, from September 6, 1997, to May 20, 2000.

In the years of 1998 to 2000, Stay Gold ran prominently in many of Japan's top races, including the Diamond Stakes, Tenno Sho (Spring), Takarazuka Kinen, Arima Kinen, and Tenno Sho (Autumn). He collected 9 places and 7 shows, but victory proved elusive.

Despite the fact that he had not won any graded races thus far, Stay Gold accumulated significant earnings due to his consistent podium placements. His title was "Major Racing Wins: Lake Akan-ko special" and he was deemed "the successor to Nice Nature," another Japanese racehorse who won 6 graded races but was better known for his many placed efforts.

On May 20, 2000, he was ridden by Yutaka Take and in the Meguro Kinen and obtained victory for the first time in 2 years and 8 months. It would be his only win of the year.

The year 2001 began with Stay Gold winning first place in the Grade II Nikkei Shinshun Hai. He then aimed at the Dubai Sheema Classic (then a UAE-G2) at Nad Al Sheba Racecourse. Fantastic Light, winner of the previous year's World Series Racing Championship, was the clear favourite, with Stay Gold a 33-1 shot. Fantastic Light took the lead a furlong out, but Stay Gold rallied to get up on the line, winning by a nose after finding an opportunity to move through a gap in the final straight. It was the first victory outside Japan for Sunday Silence's progeny.

In October 2001, he took on two of Japan's best thoroughbreds, T M Opera O and Narita Top Road, in the Kyoto Daishoten and finished in first place. However, during the race he cut off Narita Top Road, injuring both the horse and his jockey, and leading to his disqualification from the race.

His last run was for the Hong Kong Vase at Sha Tin Racecourse, Hong Kong. There, he wore a saddle towel with his name written as "黃金旅程" in the Traditional Chinese language, which translates to "Golden Journey". "黃金旅程" is pronounced in standard Chinese as "huáng jīn lǔ chéng". On the final straight, Stay Gold closed a gap of approximately 5 lengths and caught up to Ekraar in the final strides and won by a head. After the race, Yutaka Take, who rode him, said, "Wings grew on his back." At the end of the season, Stay Gold was awarded by the Japan Racing Association with the JRA Special Award for becoming the first overseas G1 race winner that was born and trained in Japan. (Note: The first Japanese-bred horse to win an overseas G1 race was Shiva in the 1999 Tattersalls Gold Cup, however she was trained in Britain.)

Although initially unplanned, fan outcry and a request from the JRA after his victory at Hong Kong led to Stay Gold's retirement ceremony being performed at Kyoto Racecourse on January 20, 2002.

== Stud record ==
At the end of his racing career, Stay Gold was retired to become a breeding stallion and proved to be a very successful sire, fathering 13 Group 1 winners. Orfevre won the Japanese Triple Crown and finished second in the Prix de l'Arc de Triomphe for two consecutive years. Gold Ship won six Grade 1 races including the Arima Kinen, Kikuka Shō, and Takarazuka Kinen twice; Oju Chosan won nine Grade 1 jump races and reigned as the undisputed steeplechase champion; Dream Journey and Fenomeno also achieved considerable successes.

He died suddenly on February 5, 2015, at the age of 20, due to an arterial rupture.

=== Major winners ===
c = colt, f = filly, g = gelding

Foaled	Name	Sex	Major Wins
2003	Meiner Neos	c	Nakayama Grand Jump
2004	Dream Journey	c	Asahi Hai Futurity Stakes, Takarazuka Kinen, Arima Kinen
2004	El Dorado	g	Singapore Gold Cup (three times)
2006	Nakayama Festa	c	Takarazuka Kinen
2008	Orfevre	c	Japanese Triple Crown (Satsuki Sho, Tokyo Yushun, Kikuka Sho), Arima Kinen (twice), Takarazuka Kinen
2009	Gold Ship	c	Satsuki Sho, Kikuka Sho, Arima Kinen, Takarazuka Kinen (twice), Tenno Sho (Spring)
2009	Fenomeno	c	Tenno Sho (Spring) (twice)
2011	Oju Chosan	c	Nakayama Grand Jump (six times), Nakayama Daishogai (three times)
2011	Red Reveur	f	Hanshin Juvenile Fillies
2013	Admire Lead	f	Victoria Mile
2013	Rainbow Line	c	Tenno Sho (Spring)
2014	Win Bright	c	Queen Elizabeth II Cup, Hong Kong Cup
2015	Indy Champ	c	Yasuda Kinen, Mile Championship

== In popular culture ==
An anthropomorphized version of Stay Gold appears as a character in the Japanese multimedia franchise Umamusume: Pretty Derby, voiced by Satsumi Matsuda. She is depicted as a petite woman with dark-brown hair and a trench coat who enjoys travelling for long periods of time. She is aware of Umamusume being reincarnations of real-world racehorses, and seeks to prevent the tragedies that resulted in the deaths of racehorses and ensure that their Umamusume counterparts live better lives. She also serves as the leader of a friend group of admirers called the "Gold Clan", among them her roommate Gold Ship, Nakayama Festa, Dream Journey, Orfevre, and Fenomeno, all of whose real-world selves were progeny of Stay Gold.

Initially, Stay Gold was represented by "Kin'iro Ryotei", a background character in the first season of the franchise's anime adaptation, before officially being featured in the Japanese version of the mobile game in 2025.

== Racing form ==
Stay Gold won seven races out of 50 starts with 20 more podiums finishes. The data available is based on JBIS, netkeiba, racingpost and HKJC. All of Stay Gold's races were run on turf, except for his 3YO Maiden race ran on February 15 1997, which was ran on dirt.

Date	Track	Race	Grade	Distance (Condition)	Entry	HN	Odds (Favored)	Finish	Time	Margins	Jockey	Winner (Runner-up)
1996 – two-year-old season
Dec 1	Hanshin	2yo Newcomer		2,000 m (Firm)	14	9	7.1 (3)	3rd	2:05.3	0.1	Olivier Peslier	Makihata Spurt
Dec 21	Hanshin	2yo Newcomer		2,000 m (Firm)	16	7	2.2 (1)	16th	2:11.8	6.0	Olivier Peslier	Osumi Sunday
1997 – three-year-old season
Feb 15	Kyoto	3yo Maiden		1,800 m (Fast)	12	11	1.9 (1)	DNF	–	–	Shigefumi Kumazawa	Hurry Upski
Mar 22	Hanshin	3yo Maiden		2,000 m (Good)	13	13	4.5 (2)	2nd	2:06.9	0.0	Shigefumi Kumazawa	Pulsebeat
Apr 19	Kyoto	3yo Maiden		2,400 m (Firm)	18	7	2.0 (1)	2nd	2:27.4	0.2	Shigefumi Kumazawa	Tamamo Inazuma
May 11	Tokyo	3yo Maiden		2,400 m (Firm)	18	16	3.5 (2)	1st	2:28.4	–0.1	Shigefumi Kumazawa	(Top Ladder)
Jun 7	Chukyo	Suiren Sho	ALW (1W)	2,500 m (Firm)	10	3	3.0 (1)	1st	2:37.4	–0.2	Shigefumi Kumazawa	(Bin Rashid Bin)
Jun 29	Hanshin	Yamayuri Stakes	ALW (2W)	2,000 m (Good)	13	6	9.9 (5)	4th	2:03.7	0.3	Shigefumi Kumazawa	Namura Kinto Un
Sep 6	Sapporo	Akanko Tokubetsu	ALW (2W)	2,000 m (Firm)	14	13	8.4 (3)	1st	2:02.5	–0.1	Shigefumi Kumazawa	(Minamino Pheasant)
Oct 12	Kyoto	Kyoto Shimbun Hai	2	2,200 m (Firm)	12	3	16.7 (7)	4th	2:13.5	0.4	Shigefumi Kumazawa	Matikanefukukitaru
Nov 2	Kyoto	Kikuka Sho	1	3,000 m (Firm)	18	1	38.0 (10)	8th	3:08.2	0.5	Shigefumi Kumazawa	Matikanefukukitaru
Nov 30	Hanshin	Golden Whip Trophy	ALW (3W)	2,000 m (Firm)	13	7	1.5 (1)	2nd	2:01.4	0.1	Yutaka Take	First Sonia
1998 – four-year-old season
Jan 17	Kyoto	Manyo Stakes	OP	3,000 m (Firm)	14	4	3.8 (2)	2nd	3:06.3	0.0	Shigefumi Kumazawa	Yusei Top Run
Feb 8	Kyoto	Shorai Stakes	ALW (3W)	2,400 m (Firm)	16	14	4.8 (3)	2nd	2:28.0	0.0	Shigefumi Kumazawa	Alabanza
Feb 21	Tokyo	Diamond Stakes	3	3,200 m (Good)	16	14	5.5 (3)	2nd	3:17.8	0.2	Shigefumi Kumazawa	Yusei Top Run
Mar 29	Nakayama	Nikkei Sho	2	2,500 m (Firm)	12	10	7.3 (5)	4th	2:34.9	0.5	Shigefumi Kumazawa	Tenjin Shogun
May 3	Kyoto	Tenno Sho (Spring)	1	3,200 m (Firm)	14	9	57.9 (10)	2nd	3:23.9	0.3	Shigefumi Kumazawa	Mejiro Bright
Jun 13	Tokyo	Meguro Kinen	2	2,500 m (Soft)	13	4	6.8 (3)	3rd	2:35.5	0.5	Shigefumi Kumazawa	Going Suzuka
Jul 12	Hanshin	Takarazuka Kinen	1	2,200 m (Firm)	13	4	42.3 (9)	2nd	2:12.0	0.1	Shigefumi Kumazawa	Silence Suzuka
Oct 11	Kyoto	Kyoto Daishoten	2	2,400 m (Firm)	7	6	3.3 (2)	4th	2:26.2	0.6	Shigefumi Kumazawa	Seiun Sky
Nov 1	Tokyo	Tenno Sho (Autumn)	1	2,000 m (Firm)	12	10	16.7 (4)	2nd	1:59.5	0.2	Masayoshi Ebina	Offside Trap
Nov 29	Tokyo	Japan Cup	1	2,400 m (Firm)	15	7	12.4 (6)	10th	2:27.3	1.4	Shigefumi Kumazawa	El Condor Pasa
Dec 27	Nakayama	Arima Kinen	1	2,500 m (Firm)	16	5	40.8 (11)	3rd	2:32.6	0.5	Shigefumi Kumazawa	Grass Wonder
1999 – five-year-old season
Feb 14	Kyoto	Kyoto Kinen	2	2,200 m (Firm)	10	6	4.5 (2)	7th	2:16.1	0.9	Shigefumi Kumazawa	Emocion
Mar 28	Nakayama	Nikkei Sho	2	2,500 m (Good)	13	1	5.6 (2)	3rd	2:36.3	1.0	Shigefumi Kumazawa	Seiun Sky
May 2	Kyoto	Tenno Sho (Spring)	1	3,200 m (Firm)	12	2	27.8 (6)	5th	3:16.2	0.9	Shigefumi Kumazawa	Special Week
May 29	Chukyo	Kinko Sho	2	2,000 m (Firm)	15	9	4.3 (3)	3rd	1:59.9	0.2	Shigefumi Kumazawa	Midnight Bet
Jun 20	Hanshin	Naruo Kinen	2	2,000 m (Firm)	10	2	3.7 (3)	3rd	2:02.6	0.1	Shigefumi Kumazawa	Suehiro Commander
Jul 11	Hanshin	Takarazuka Kinen	1	2,200 m (Firm)	12	1	32.5 (7)	3rd	2:13.7	1.6	Shigefumi Kumazawa	Grass Wonder
Oct 10	Kyoto	Kyoto Daishoten	2	2,400 m (Firm)	10	8	35.2 (7)	6th	2:25.0	0.7	Shigefumi Kumazawa	Tsurumaru Tsuyoshi
Oct 31	Tokyo	Tenno Sho (Autumn)	1	2,000 m (Firm)	17	6	50.3 (12)	2nd	1:58.1	0.1	Shigefumi Kumazawa	Special Week
Nov 28	Tokyo	Japan Cup	1	2,400 m (Firm)	14	10	13.9 (5)	6th	2:26.6	1.1	Shigefumi Kumazawa	Special Week
Dec 26	Nakayama	Arima Kinen	1	2,500 m (Firm)	14	5	31.6 (8)	10th	2:38.2	1.0	Shigefumi Kumazawa	Grass Wonder
2000 – six-year-old season
Jan 23	Nakayama	American Jockey Club Cup	2	2,200 m (Firm)	14	9	2.6 (1)	2nd	2:13.8	0.4	Shigefumi Kumazawa	Matikane Kinnohosi
Feb 20	Kyoto	Kyoto Kinen	2	2,200 m (Firm)	11	4	5.6 (3)	3rd	2:14.0	0.2	Shigefumi Kumazawa	T M Opera O
Mar 26	Nakayama	Nikkei Sho	2	2,500 m (Firm)	10	6	5.7 (2)	2nd	2:35.6	0.2	Shigefumi Kumazawa	Leo Ryuho
Apr 30	Kyoto	Tenno Sho (Spring)	1	3,200 m (Firm)	12	3	11.7 (4)	4th	3:18.3	0.7	Shigefumi Kumazawa	T M Opera O
May 20	Tokyo	Meguro Kinen	2	2,500 m (Soft)	15	14	2.8 (1)	1st	2:33.2	–0.2	Yutaka Take	(Matikane Kinnohosi)
Jun 25	Hanshin	Takarazuka Kinen	1	2,200 m (Firm)	11	3	12.5 (5)	4th	2:14.1	0.3	Katsumi Ando	T M Opera O
Sep 24	Nakayama	Sankei Sho All Comers	2	2,200 m (Soft)	9	1	4.2 (3)	5th	2:17.0	1.2	Hiroki Goto	Meisho Doto
Oct 29	Tokyo	Tenno Sho (Autumn)	1	2,000 m (Soft)	16	9	7.5 (4)	7th	2:00.8	0.9	Yutaka Take	T M Opera O
Nov 26	Tokyo	Japan Cup	1	2,400 m (Firm)	16	16	54.3 (13)	8th	2:26.6	0.5	Hiroki Goto	T M Opera O
Dec 24	Nakayama	Arima Kinen	1	2,500 m (Firm)	16	11	46.5 (10)	7th	2:34.8	0.7	Hiroki Goto	T M Opera O
2001 – seven-year-old season
Jan 14	Kyoto	Nikkei Shinshun Hai	2	2,400 m (Firm)	11	1	7.6 (5)	1st	2:25.8	–0.2	Shinji Fujita	(San M.X.)
Mar 24	Nad Al Sheba	Dubai Sheema Classic	2	2,400 m (Good)	16	14	33/1 (12)	1st	2:28.2	0.0	Yutaka Take	(Fantastic Light)
Jun 24	Hanshin	Takarazuka Kinen	1	2,200 m (Firm)	12	9	18.3 (5)	4th	2:12.1	0.4	Hiroki Goto	Meisho Doto
Oct 7	Kyoto	Kyoto Daishoten	2	2,400 m (Firm)	7	6	12.8 (3)	DSQ	–	–	Hiroki Goto	T M Opera O
Oct 28	Tokyo	Tenno Sho (Autumn)	1	2,000 m (Soft)	13	4	4.5 (3)	7th	2:03.4	1.4	Yutaka Take	Agnes Digital
Nov 25	Tokyo	Japan Cup	1	2,400 m (Firm)	15	8	8.1 (4)	4th	2:24.5	0.7	Yutaka Take	Jungle Pocket
Dec 16	Sha Tin	Hong Kong Vase	1	2,400 m (Firm)	14	9	2.0 (1)	1st	2:27.8	–0.1	Yutaka Take	(Ekraar)

== Pedigree ==
Pedigree of Stay Gold
Sire Sunday Silence 1986 dkb/br. USA	Halo; 1969 blk/br. USA	Hail to Reason	Turn-To
Sire Sunday Silence 1986 dkb/br. USA	Halo; 1969 blk/br. USA	Hail to Reason	Nothirdchance
Sire Sunday Silence 1986 dkb/br. USA	Halo; 1969 blk/br. USA	Cosmah	Cosmic Bomb
Sire Sunday Silence 1986 dkb/br. USA	Halo; 1969 blk/br. USA	Cosmah	Almahmoud
Sire Sunday Silence 1986 dkb/br. USA	Wishing Well; 1975 br. USA	Understanding	Promised Land
Sire Sunday Silence 1986 dkb/br. USA	Wishing Well; 1975 br. USA	Understanding	Pretty Ways
Sire Sunday Silence 1986 dkb/br. USA	Wishing Well; 1975 br. USA	Mountain Flower	Montparnasse
Sire Sunday Silence 1986 dkb/br. USA	Wishing Well; 1975 br. USA	Mountain Flower	Edel Weiss
Dam Golden Sash 1988 ch. Japan	Dictus; 1967 ch. France	Sanctus	Fine Top
Dam Golden Sash 1988 ch. Japan	Dictus; 1967 ch. France	Sanctus	Sanelta
Dam Golden Sash 1988 ch. Japan	Dictus; 1967 ch. France	Doronic	Worden
Dam Golden Sash 1988 ch. Japan	Dictus; 1967 ch. France	Doronic	Dulzetta
Dam Golden Sash 1988 ch. Japan	Dyna Sash; 1979 b. Japan	Northern Taste	Northern Dancer
Dam Golden Sash 1988 ch. Japan	Dyna Sash; 1979 b. Japan	Northern Taste	Lady Victoria
Dam Golden Sash 1988 ch. Japan	Dyna Sash; 1979 b. Japan	Royal Sash	Princely Gift
Dam Golden Sash 1988 ch. Japan	Dyna Sash; 1979 b. Japan	Royal Sash	Sash of Honour F-No.1-t

== See also ==
- List of racehorses
