= T. M. Opera O =

Japanese-bred Thoroughbred racehorse

T. M. Opera O テイエムオペラオー
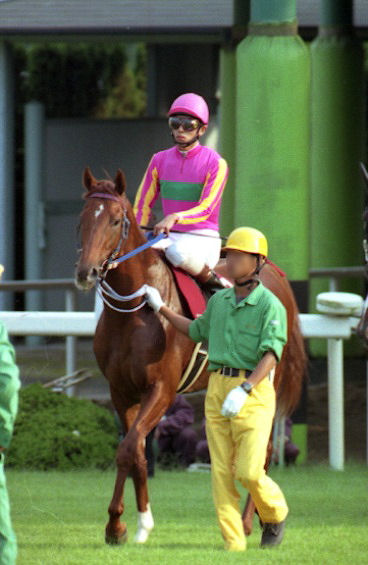
- T. M. Opera O at age three
- Breed: Thoroughbred
- Sire: Opera House
- Grandsire: Sadler's Wells
- Dam: Once Wed
- Damsire: Blushing Groom
- Sex: Stallion
- Foaled: March 13, 1996
- Died: May 17, 2018 (aged 22)
- Country: Japan
- Colour: Chestnut
- Breeder: Kineusu Bokujo
- Owner: Masatsugu Takezono
- Racing colours
- Trainer: Ichizo Iwamoto
- Jockey: Ryuji Wada
- Record: 26: 14-6-3
- Earnings: 1,835,189,000 JPY

Major wins
- Mainichi Hai (1999); Kyoto Kinen (2000); Hanshin Daishoten (2000); Tenno Sho (Spring) (2000, 2001); Takarazuka Kinen (2000); Kyoto Daishoten (2000, 2001); Tenno Sho (Autumn) (2000); Japan Cup (2000); Arima Kinen (2000); Japanese Classic Race wins: Satsuki Sho (1999)

Awards
- JRA Award for Best Three-Year-Old Colt (1999); Japanese Horse of the Year (2000); JRA Award for Best Older Male Horse (2000); Timeform rating: 128

Honours
- Japan Racing Association Hall of Fame (2004)

T. M. Opera O (Japanese: テイエムオペラオー, Hepburn: Tei Emu Opera Ō; March 13, 1996 – May 17, 2018) was a champion Japanese Thoroughbred racehorse, and the world's all-time leading money earner at the time of his retirement in 2001. In 1999, he was the champion three-year-old colt in Japan after winning the Satsuki Sho (Japanese 2000 Guineas). At age four, he was the Japanese Horse of the Year and champion older horse after an undefeated season. This included wins in both the spring and autumn Tennō Shōs, the Takarazuka Kinen, the Japan Cup and the Arima Kinen; a feat referred to as completing a "Grand Slam" and which only T. M. Opera O has ever achieved. He was inducted into the Japan Racing Association Hall of Fame in 2004.

== Background ==
T. M. Opera O was a chestnut horse who was bred in Japan by Kineusu Bokujo. He was sired by Opera House, an outstanding British middle-distance runner who was exported to stud in Japan. T. M. Opera O was out of the American-bred mare Once Wed, an unraced daughter of Blushing Groom. He was sold as a yearling in the 1997 Hokkaido October Sale for 10,500,000(JPY) to Masatsugu Takezono. The horse was trained by Ichizo Iwamoto and regularly ridden by Ryuji Wada.

In 1999, T. M. Opera O became the first winner of a classic race that benefitted from a major 1992 change to the Japan Racing Association's regulations. He originally missed the standard registration deadline for entry into the Japanese Classic Races. However, the rule change meant he was able to race in them after a supplemental registration fee five times more costly than the standard fee was paid. The revision to the rules came about following significant public pressure when Oguri Cap missed his deadline for the 1988 classics.

== Racing career ==
=== 1998: Two-year-old season ===
T. M. Opera O entered his debut race as the favorite, but finished second in what was his only start that season. He injured his left hind leg and was unable to race again for several months.

=== 1999: Three-year-old season ===
At age three, he made ten starts, amassing a record of four wins, two seconds and three thirds. Early in the year he broke his maiden, then won the Yukiyanagi Sho at Hanshin over a distance of 2000m for his first stakes win. He followed this up by winning the Grade III Mainichi Hai on March 28, 1999. Despite his three-race winning streak, he was largely dismissed at odds of 11–1 in the Grade I Satsuki Sho (Japanese 2000 Guineas) on April 18. He raced near the back of the field during the early running then circled wide in deep stretch and prevailed by a neck in the final strides.

Later that year, he finished second in the Kikuka Sho (Japanese St Leger) and third in both the Tokyo Yushun (Japanese Derby) and Arima Kinen. He received the JRA Award for Best Three-Year-Old Colt.

=== 2000: Four-year-old season ===
As a four-year-old in 2000, T. M. Opera O was undefeated in 8 starts, including five domestic Grade I wins and one international Grade I win.

He started the season on March 19 with a win in the Hanshin Daishoten at a distance of 3000m. He then won the Tenno Sho (spring) at a distance of 3200m (roughly 2 miles) before shortening up to a distance of 2200m to win the Takarazuka Kinen.

After a brief layoff, T. M. Opera won the Kyoto Daishoten on October 8. On October 29, he started in the 2000m Tenno Sho (autumn) from the outside post position 13. Jockey Ryuji Wada rode him strongly from the gate and moved aggressively towards the rail to save ground around the first turn. T. M. Opera O settled in third place then swung wide as they turned into the final stretch. He battled with Meisho Doto before hitting the lead with 200m remaining, then drew away to win by 2 1/2 lengths. He became just the third horse to win both the spring and autumn versions of the Tenno Sho in the same year. "He has no faults", said Wada. "And mentally he's so tough I wish he’d share some of it with me."

T. M. Opera O earned the seventh straight win of his four-year old campaign in the Japan Cup. He was made the heavy favorite by a crowd of 110,000 in a field that included eight horses from Japan and seven foreign entries. Stay Gold went to the early lead and set a slow pace, while T. M. Opera O settled into sixth place. T. M. Opera O started his move on the final turn and took the lead with 200m remaining. Under heavy urging, he withstood a late charge by Meisho Doto to win by a neck, with Fantastic Light a further nose behind in third. The win moved T. M. Opera O past Cigar as the leading money earner of all-time with winnings of 1.26 billion yen or $11.6 million.

On December 24, T. M. Opera O made his final start of the year in the Arima Kinen at Nakayama Racecourse. He raced near the back of the field down the backstretch, then slowly made up ground on the final turn. Entering the final stretch, he was still well behind and faced a wall of horses in front of him. Wada decided to wait for an opening rather than lose ground by attempting to swing wide. With just 200m remaining, he finally found a narrow gap and urged T. M. Opera to squeeze through. The horse responded with a burst and closed rapidly to prevail over Meisho Doto by a nose. "I'm relieved", said Wada. "It was a tough race. I couldn't get the position I wanted at the start and I thought I'd blown it."

T. M. Opera O was the unanimous selection as the Japanese Horse of the Year and Best Older Horse.

=== 2001: Five-year-old season ===
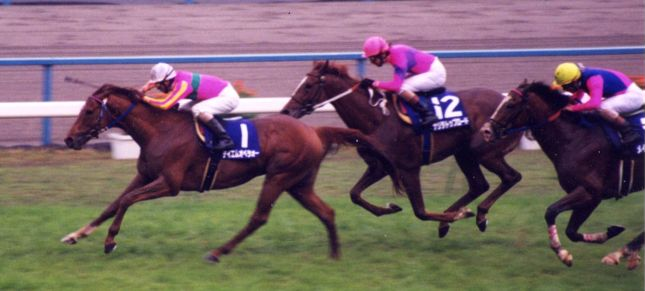
T. M. Opera O winning the 2001 Tenno Sho (spring)

In 2001, T. M. Opera O won two of seven starts with three second-place finishes. The highlight of this year was a repeat win in the Tenno Sho (spring), in which he defeated Meisho Doto by a nose.

On June 25, T. M. Opera O attempted to repeat in the Takarazuka Kinen but was upset by Meisho Doto. T. M. Opera O had experienced severe traffic problems before swinging wide and mounting a "spectacular" closing drive that fell short by 1 1/4 lengths. It was Meisho Doto's first win against T. M. Opera O in six attempts, all in Grade 1 events.

After a brief layoff, T. M. Opera O returned on October 1 to race in the Kyoto Daishoten. Whilst in the race itself T. M. Opera O narrowly placed second, the first place racer Stay Gold cut off Narita Top Road in the final sprint and caused his jockey to fall. Stay Gold was consequently disqualified from the race, leading to T. M. Opera O being declared the winner. On October 28, T. M. Opera O finished second in the Tenno Sho (autumn) to Agnes Digital, with Meisho Doto in third. In his next start on November 25, he finished second in the Japan Cup, just a neck short of Japanese Derby winner Jungle Pocket. He made his final start in the Arima Kinen, finishing fifth.

T. M. Opera O retired at the end of 2001 as the world's all-time leading money-earner. He won 1,835,189,000 yen (US$16,200,337) (Note: The conversion to USD was made during T. M. Opera O's racing career and does not reflect current conversion rates) during his career.

== Stud career and death ==
T. M. Opera O was retired to stud in 2002, during which he covered 98 mares. He was not considered a success and interest in him steadily declined. His most successful offspring on the flat was T M Yokado, winner of the Queen Sho; out of T. M. Opera O's 139 foals that won a flat race, none of them achieved a graded victory. However, T. M. Toppazure became his leading money earner after a successful second career as a jumper. Unusually for a retired G1 winning horse, T. M. Opera O's stable was not open for guided tours for most of his retirement, following an incident with visiting fans.

T. M. Opera O died suddenly after suffering a heart attack at the Hakuba Bokujo, Hokkaido, on May 17, 2018. T. M. Opera O's funeral ceremony was held on June 15, 2018, at Hakuba Bokujo together with Goshawk Ken, another horse that died three days prior to T. M. Opera O.

In September 2003, the Journal of Equine Science published a research paper that centered on T. M. Opera O's heart, comparing it to other racehorses active at the time. It found that T. M. Opera O's heart had a noticeably heavier left ventricular mass than the other horses examined, and a low resting heart rate of 25 beats per minute. The authors of the article suggested T. M. Opera O's unusually large heart was responsible for reducing his resting heart rate. When writing about this article, racing journalist David Ashforth attributed T. M. Opera O's success on the race track to his heart's size, drawing a parallel to similar investigations into horseracing legends Secretariat and Eclipse's hearts, which were also found to be unusually large.

== In popular culture ==
An anthropomorphized version of T. M. Opera O appears as a character in the Japanese multimedia franchise Umamusume: Pretty Derby, voiced by Sora Tokui. She is portrayed as a verbose, orange-haired girl with an inflated ego and a penchant for theatrics, but also goes out of her way to offer encouragement to her companions and opponents if it means improving their competitiveness. The character is featured in the franchise's spin-off anime Umamusume: Pretty Derby – Road to the Top together with Admire Vega and Narita Top Road. She would later return as a major antagonist in the movie Umamusume: Pretty Derby – Beginning of a New Era, which retells the rise of Jungle Pocket and the end of Opera O's winning streak.

== Racing statistics ==
Below data is based on data available on JBIS Search, and netkeiba.

Date	Distance (Condition)	Race	Class	Course	Field	Odds (Favourite)	Finish	Time	Winning (Losing) Margin	Jockey	Winner (2nd Place)	Ref
1998 – Two-year-old season
Aug 15	Turf 1600 m (Firm)	Two Year Old Debut		Kyoto	12	1.5 (1st)	2nd	1:36.7	(6 lengths)	Ryuji Wada	Classic Stage	
1999 – Three-year-old season
Jan 16	Dirt 1400 m (Firm)	Three Year Old		Kyoto	16	3.9 (2nd)	4th	1:28.0	(4 1/2 lengths)	Ryuji Wada	Zenno Honimbo	
Feb 6	Dirt 1800 m (Firm)	Three Year Old		Kyoto	10	1.8 (1st)	1st	1:55.6	5 lengths	Ryuji Wada	(Himino Commander)	
Feb 27	Turf 2000 m (Good)	Yukiyanagi Sho	1 Win (Note: A race for horses that have achieved exactly one win in previous races.)	Hanshin	14	4.8 (2nd)	1st	2:05.3	3/4 length	Ryuji Wada	(Uncle Through)	
Mar 28	Turf 2000 m (Firm)	Mainichi Hai	GIII	Hanshin	14	7.3 (3rd)	1st	2:04.1	4 lengths	Ryuji Wada	(Tagano Brian)	
Apr 18	Turf 2000 m (Firm)	Satsuki Sho	GI	Nakayama	17	11.1 (5th)	1st	2:00.7	neck	Ryuji Wada	(Osumi Bright)	
Jun 6	Turf 2400 m (Firm)	Tokyo Yushun	GI	Tokyo	18	4.2 (3rd)	3rd	2:25.6	(1 1/2 lengths)	Ryuji Wada	Admire Vega	
Oct 10	Turf 2400 m (Firm)	Kyoto Daishoten	GII	Kyoto	10	5.5 (3rd)	3rd	2:24.4	(3/4 length)	Ryuji Wada	Tsurumaru Tsuyoshi	
Nov 7	Turf 3000 m (Firm)	Kikuka Sho	GI	Kyoto	15	3.5 (2nd)	2nd	3:07.7	(neck)	Ryuji Wada	Narita Top Road	
Dec 4	Turf 3600 m (Firm)	Stayers Stakes	GII	Nakayama	14	1.1 (1st)	2nd	3:46.2	(neck)	Ryuji Wada	Painted Black	
Dec 26	Turf 2500 m (Firm)	Arima Kinen	GI	Nakayama	14	12.0 (5th)	3rd	2:37.2	(1/4 length)	Ryuji Wada	Grass Wonder	
2000 – Four-year-old season
Feb 20	Turf 2200 m (Firm)	Kyoto Kinen	GII	Kyoto	11	1.9 (1st)	1st	2:13.8	neck	Ryuji Wada	(Narita Top Road)	
Mar 19	Turf 3000 m (Good)	Hanshin Daishoten	GII	Hanshin	9	2.0 (1st)	1st	3:09.4	2 1/2 lengths	Ryuji Wada	(Rascal Suzuka)	
Apr 30	Turf 3200 m (Firm)	Tenno Sho (Spring)	GI	Kyoto	12	1.7 (1st)	1st	3:17.6	3/4 length	Ryuji Wada	(Rascal Suzuka)	
Jun 25	Turf 2200 m (Firm)	Takarazuka Kinen	GI	Hanshin	11	1.9 (1st)	1st	2:13.8	neck	Ryuji Wada	(Meisho Doto)	
Oct 8	Turf 2400 m (Firm)	Kyoto Daishoten	GII	Kyoto	12	1.8 (1st)	1st	2:26.0	head	Ryuji Wada	(Narita Top Road)	
Oct 29	Turf 2000 m (Soft)	Tenno Sho (Autumn)	GI	Tokyo	16	2.4 (1st)	1st	1:59.9	2 1/2 lengths	Ryuji Wada	(Meisho Doto)	
Nov 26	Turf 2400 m (Firm)	Japan Cup	GI	Tokyo	16	1.5 (1st)	1st	2:26.1	neck	Ryuji Wada	(Meisho Doto)	
Dec 24	Turf 2500 m (Firm)	Arima Kinen	GI	Nakayama	16	1.7 (1st)	1st	2:34.1	nose	Ryuji Wada	(Meisho Doto)	
2001 – Five-year-old season
Apr 1	Turf 2000 m (Firm)	Sankei Osaka Hai	GII	Hanshin	14	1.3 (1st)	4th	1:58.7	(2 lengths)	Ryuji Wada	Toho Dream	
Apr 29	Turf 3200 m (Firm)	Tenno Sho (Spring)	GI	Kyoto	12	2.0 (1st)	1st	3:16.2	1/2 length	Ryuji Wada	(Meisho Doto)	
Jun 24	Turf 2200 m (Firm)	Takarazuka Kinen	GI	Hanshin	12	1.5 (1st)	2nd	2:11.9	(1 1/4 lengths)	Ryuji Wada	Meisho Doto	
Oct 7	Turf 2400 m (Firm)	Kyoto Daishoten	GII	Kyoto	7	1.4 (1st)	1st (Note: Stay Gold originally crossed the line first, however, he was disqualified after the race for cut off Narita Top Road and injured both the horse and jockey.)	2:25.0	5 lengths	Ryuji Wada	(Suehiro Commander)	
Oct 28	Turf 2000 m (Soft)	Tenno Sho (Autumn)	GI	Tokyo	13	2.1 (1st)	2nd	2:02.2	(1 length)	Ryuji Wada	Agnes Digital	
Nov 25	Turf 2400 m (Firm)	Japan Cup	GI	Tokyo	15	2.8 (1st)	2nd	2:23.8	(neck)	Ryuji Wada	Jungle Pocket	
Dec 23	Turf 2500 m (Firm)	Arima Kinen	GI	Nakayama	13	1.8 (1st)	5th	2:33.3	(2 lengths)	Ryuji Wada	Manhattan Cafe	

== Pedigree ==
Pedigree of T. M. Opera O, chestnut horse, foaled March 13, 1996, in Japan
Sire Opera House (GB)	Sadler's Wells	Northern Dancer	Nearctic
Sire Opera House (GB)	Sadler's Wells	Northern Dancer	Natalma
Sire Opera House (GB)	Sadler's Wells	Fairy Bridge	Bold Reason
Sire Opera House (GB)	Sadler's Wells	Fairy Bridge	Special
Sire Opera House (GB)	Colorspin	High Top (IRE)	Derring-Do (GB)
Sire Opera House (GB)	Colorspin	High Top (IRE)	Camenae (GB)
Sire Opera House (GB)	Colorspin	Reprocolor (GB)	Jimmy Reppin (GB)
Sire Opera House (GB)	Colorspin	Reprocolor (GB)	Blue Queen (GB)
Dam Once Wed	Blushing Groom (FR)	Red God	Nasrullah
Dam Once Wed	Blushing Groom (FR)	Red God	Spring Run
Dam Once Wed	Blushing Groom (FR)	Runaway Bride (GB)	Wild Risk (FR)
Dam Once Wed	Blushing Groom (FR)	Runaway Bride (GB)	Aimee (GB)
Dam Once Wed	Noura	Key to the Kingdom	Bold Ruler
Dam Once Wed	Noura	Key to the Kingdom	Key Bridge
Dam Once Wed	Noura	River Guide	Drone
Dam Once Wed	Noura	River Guide	Blue Canoe

In the pedigree, symbols before a horse's name mean the horse was foaled in one country but subsequently stood at stud in another

== See also ==
- List of leading Thoroughbred racehorses
- List of racehorses
