= Admire Vega =

Japanese-bred Thoroughbred racehorse

Admire Vega アドマイヤベガ
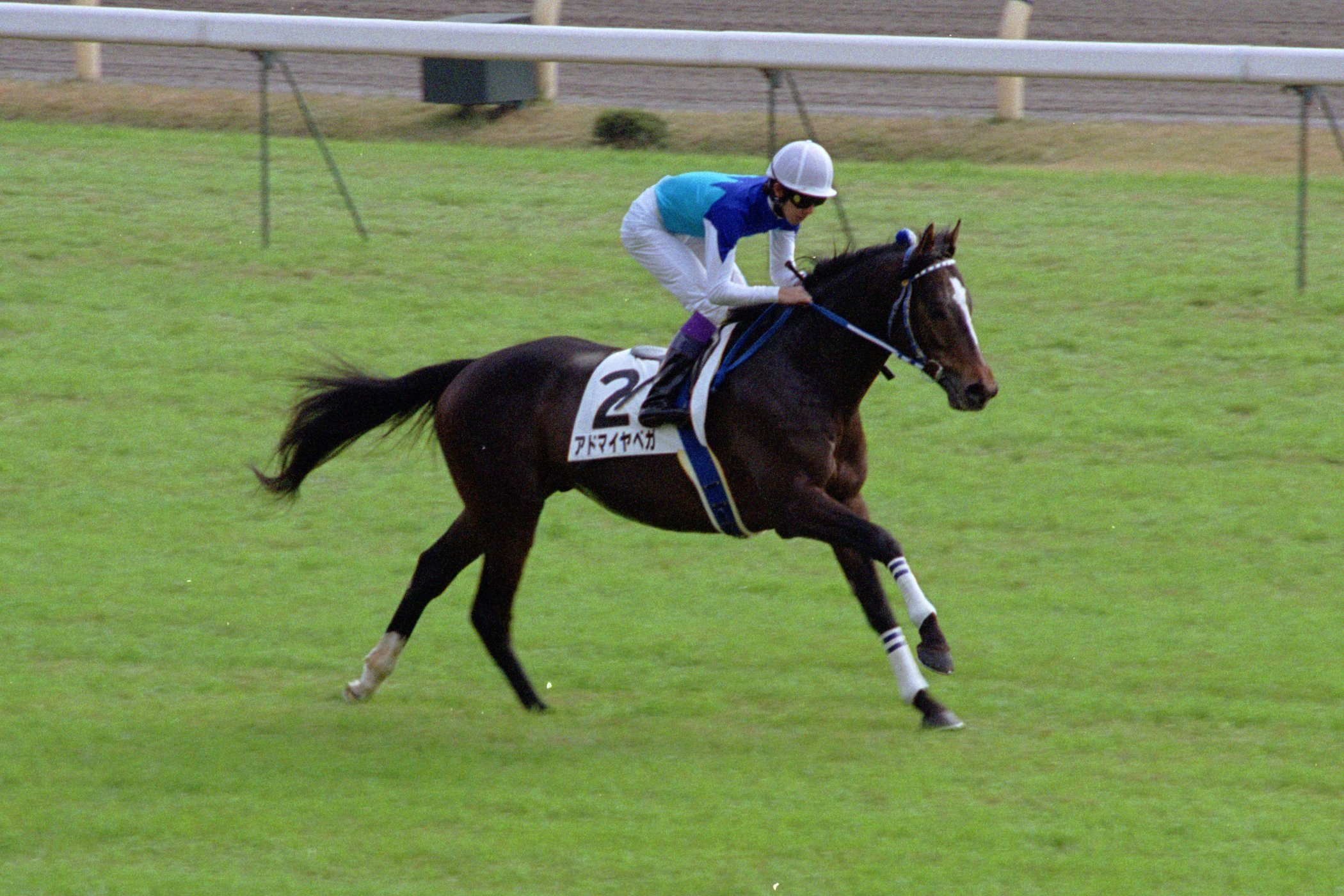
- Admire Vega at the 1999 Tokyo Yushun.
- Breed: Thoroughbred
- Sire: Sunday Silence
- Grandsire: Halo
- Dam: Vega
- Damsire: Tony Bin
- Sex: Stallion
- Foaled: March 12, 1996
- Died: October 29, 2004 (aged 8)
- Country: Japan
- Colour: Bay
- Breeder: Northern Farm
- Owner: Riichi Kondo
- Racing colours
- Trainer: Mitsuru Hashida
- Jockey: Yutaka Take
- Record: 8: 4-1-0
- Earnings: ¥290,602,000

Major wins
- Radio Tampa Hai Sansai Stakes (1998); Kyoto Shimbun Hai (1999); Japanese Classic Race wins: Tokyo Yushun (1999)

Admire Vega (Japanese: アドマイヤベガ, Hepburn: Adomaiya Bega; 12 March 1996 – 29 October 2004) was a Japanese Thoroughbred racehorse and sire. As a two-year-old in 1998 he won two of his three races including the Grade III Radio Tampa Hai Sansai Stakes. In the following spring he was beaten in his first two starts before recording his greatest success in defeating a strong field in the Tokyo Yushun. In the autumn he added a win in the Grade II Kyoto Shimbun Hai before being retired in 2000. He had some success in a brief stud career before dying at the age of eight.

== Background ==
Admire Vega was a bay horse with a white blaze and a white sock on his left hind leg bred in Japan by the Yoshida family's Northern Farm. He was smaller than average for a male Thoroughbred, with a maximum racing weight of 464 kg. He was sired by Sunday Silence, who won the 1989 Kentucky Derby, before retiring to stud in Japan where he was champion sire on thirteen consecutive occasions. His other major winners included Deep Impact, Stay Gold, Heart's Cry, Manhattan Cafe, Zenno Rob Roy and Neo Universe. Admire Vega's dam Vega was an outstanding racemare who won the Oka Sho and the Yushun Himba in 1993. As a broodmare Vega also produced the multiple Grade I winner Admire Don and Historic Star, the dam of Harp Star. Vega was a descendant of the American mare Nellie Morse, making him a distant relative of Bold Forbes and Bet Twice. The colt was acquired by Riichi Kondo and was sent into training with Mitsuru Hashida.

== Racing career ==
=== 1998: two-year-old season ===
Admire Vega began his racing career by finishing fourth to Mayano Matador in a 1600-metre maiden race at Kyoto Racecourse on 7 November and recorded his first win four weeks later when he won the Erica Sho over 2000 metres at Hanshin Racecourse. On 26 December the colt was moved up in class for the Grade III Radio Tampa Hai Sansai Stakes over the same course and distance as the Erica Sho. He gained his first major success as he won from Matikane Kinnohosi and Osumi Bright.

=== 1999: three-year-old season ===
On his three-year-old debut Admire Vega contested the Grade II Hochi Hai Yayoi Sho over 2000 metres at Nakayama Racecourse on 7 March and finished second to Narita Top Road. In the Grade I Satsuki Sho over the same course and distance on 18 April he finished sixth, three lengths behind T. M. Opera O, who won from Osumi Bright and Narita Top Road. On 6 June Admire Vega was moved up in distance to contest the sixty-sixth running of the Tokyo Yushun over 2400 metres at Tokyo Racecourse. Ridden by Yutaka Take he faced seventeen opponents including T. M. Opera O, Narita Top Road and Osumi Bright. He won by a neck from Narita Top Road, with T. M. Opera O a length and a quarter back in third place.

After a break of more than four months Admire Vega returned in the Group Two Kyoto Shimbun Hai at Kyoto on 17 October and won from Narita Top Road. For his final race the colt was moved up in distance for the Grade I Kikuka Sho over 3000 metres at Kyoto on 7 November. He finished sixth of the fifteen runners, four lengths behind Narita Top Road, who won by a neck from T. M. Opera O.

He remained in training as a four-year-old but suffered from ligament problems and did not race again.

== Stud record ==
Admire Vega was retired from racing to become a breeding stallion at Shadai Stallion Station. He had some success in four seasons at stud, siring the Grade I winners Kiss to Heaven (Oka Sho) and Blumenblatt (Mile Championship). He died suddenly on 29 October 2004 at the age of eight. An autopsy revealed that the cause of death was an accidental stomach rupture.

A funeral was held for Admire Vega on 23 November of the same year at the Shadai Stallion Station, which was attended by 200 people including at least 50 fans, trainer Hashida, and House of Councillors member Seiko Hashimoto.

=== Major winners ===
c = colt, f = filly

Major winners
Foaled	Name	Sex	Major Wins
2002	Monroe Blond	f	2006 Sasebo Stakes
2002	Black Altair	g	2007 Christmas Cup
2002	T M Dragon	c	2005 Nakayama Daishogai, 2005 and 2007 Kyoto High Jump, 2006 Hanshin Spring Jump
2002	Stormy Cafe	g	2005 Kyodo Tsushin Hai
2002	Silk Worlitz	c	2006 Hida Stakes
2002	Silk Trouper	c	2005 Tachibana Stakes
2002	Sarara	f	2008 Sotobo Tokubetsu
2002	Admire Fuji	c	2006 Nikkei Shinshun Hai, 2008-09 Nakayama Kimpai
2002	Admire Title	c	2007 Sunshine Stakes
2003	Moere Connection	c	2006 Kanchiku Sho
2003	Meiner Polite	c	2008 Banshun Stakes
2003	Premium Box	c	2008 Ocean Stakes, 2009 CBC Sho, 2009 Keihan Hai
2003	Blumenblatt	f	2008 Mile Championship, 2008 Fuchu Himba Stakes
2003	Nihonpillow Regalo	c	2010 Kokura Kinen
2003	Tosho Scirocco	c	2007 Tokyo Racecource Grand Open Kinen
2003	Stella di Cuore	c	2007 Nagaoka Tokubetsu
2003	South Thida	f	2007 Hiuchiyama Tokubetsu
2003	Kiss to Heaven	f	2006 Oka Sho, 2006 Flower Cup, 2008 Keisei Hai Autumn Handicap, 2009 Nakayama Himba Stakes
2004	Nihonpillow Cherie	f	2007 Kiyotaki Tokubetsu
2004	Towa Vega	c	2010 Hanshin Spring Jump
2004	Sunrise Vega	c	2011 Kokura Daishoten
2004	Continent	c	2011 Naruto Stakes
2004	Crimson Vega	c	2009 Wakashio Sho
2004	Guilty Strike	g	2010 Tokyo Jump Stakes
2004	Al Nasrain	c	2009 Nikkei Sho
2004	Admire Atom	c	2009 Tsubame Tokubetsu
2005	Libiamo	f	2010 Oro Cup
2005	Merci Mont Saint	c	2010 Nakayama Grand Jump
2005	Miyabi Vega	c	2010 Sado Tokubetsu
2005	Boston O	c	2009 Shinsaibashi Stakes
2005	Fitz Roy	g	2009 Kokurajo Tokubetsu
2005	Street Style	f	2010 Uzushio Stakes
2005	Suez	g	2012 Hakurei Stakes
2005	Southern Galaxy	c	2009 Hayama Tokubetsu
2005	Crystal Wing	c	2009 Hidaka Tokubetsu
2005	Osumi Spark	c	2010 Kokura Daishoten

== In popular culture ==
An anthropomorphized version of Admire Vega appears as a character in the Japanese multimedia franchise Umamusume: Pretty Derby, voiced by Hitomi Sasaki. She is depicted as a somber and gloomy girl who strives to be the best runner in memory of her identical twin sister, who died when she was young. Her behavior and mannerisms are derived from survivor's guilt over her sister's death, ranging from her ears twitching at the mention of the word "sister" to preparing two birthday cakes every year. The character is featured together with T. M. Opera O and Narita Top Road in the spinoff anime Umamusume Pretty Derby: Road to the Top. The real horse's shorthand nickname of Adobe/AdVe (Japanese: アドベ) was changed by developer Cygames to Ayabe (Japanese: アヤベ) for the Umamusume character, ostensibly to avoid possible trademark infringements with Adobe Inc.

== Racing form ==
The following form is based on information available on JBIS Search and netkeiba.

Date	Age	Track	Race	Grade	Distance (condition)	Entry	HN	Odds (favored)	Finish	Time	Margin	Jockey	Winner (2nd Place)
Nov 7, 1998	2	Kyoto	3yo Newcomer		1600m (firm)	14	1	1.7 (1st)	4th	1:35.1		Yutaka Take	Mayano Matador
Dec 5, 1998	2	Hanshin	Erica Sho	1 win	2000m (good)	8	6	1.2 (1st)	1st	2:06.1	0.0	Yutaka Take	(Thrilling Sunday)
Dec 26, 1998	2	Nakayama	Radio Tampa Hai Sansai Stakes	GIII	2000m (firm)	11	4	2.1 (1st)	1st	2:04.1	-0.1	Yutaka Take	(Matikane Kinnohosi)
Mar 7, 1999	3	Nakayama	Yayoi Sho	GII	2000m (good)	15	6	1.5 (1st)	2nd	2:03.7	0.2	Yutaka Take	Narita Top Road
Apr 18, 1999	3	Nakayama	Satsuki Sho	GI	2000m (firm)	17	2	2.7 (1st)	6th	2:01.3	0.6	Yutaka Take	T. M. Opera O
June 6, 1999	3	Tokyo	Tokyo Yushun	GI	2400m (firm)	18	2	3.9 (2nd)	1st	2:25.3	0.0	Yutaka Take	(Narita Top Road)
Oct 17, 1999	3	Kyoto	Kyoto Shimbun Hai	GII	2200m (firm)	18	11	3.0 (2nd)	1st	2:12.3	0.0	Yutaka Take	(Narita Top Road)
Nov 7, 1999	3	Kyoto	Kikuka-shō	GI	3000m (firm)	15	14	2.3 (1st)	6th	3:08.2	0.6	Yutaka Take	Narita Top Road

- * Finished first but disqualified after running interference with another horse

== Pedigree ==
Pedigree of Admire Vega (JPN), bay stallion 1996
Sire Sunday Silence (USA) 1986	Halo (USA); 1969	Hail to Reason	Turn-To
Sire Sunday Silence (USA) 1986	Halo (USA); 1969	Hail to Reason	Nothirdchance
Sire Sunday Silence (USA) 1986	Halo (USA); 1969	Cosmah	Cosmic Bomb
Sire Sunday Silence (USA) 1986	Halo (USA); 1969	Cosmah	Almahmoud
Sire Sunday Silence (USA) 1986	Wishing Well (USA); 1975	Understanding	Promised Land
Sire Sunday Silence (USA) 1986	Wishing Well (USA); 1975	Understanding	Pretty Ways
Sire Sunday Silence (USA) 1986	Wishing Well (USA); 1975	Mountain Flower	Montparnasse
Sire Sunday Silence (USA) 1986	Wishing Well (USA); 1975	Mountain Flower	Edelweiss
Dam Vega (JPN) 1990	Tony Bin (IRE); 1983	Kampala	Kalamoun
Dam Vega (JPN) 1990	Tony Bin (IRE); 1983	Kampala	State Pension
Dam Vega (JPN) 1990	Tony Bin (IRE); 1983	Severn Bridge	Hornbeam
Dam Vega (JPN) 1990	Tony Bin (IRE); 1983	Severn Bridge	Priddy Fair
Dam Vega (JPN) 1990	Antique Value (USA); 1979	Northern Dancer	Nearctic
Dam Vega (JPN) 1990	Antique Value (USA); 1979	Northern Dancer	Natalma
Dam Vega (JPN) 1990	Antique Value (USA); 1979	Moonscape	Tom Fool
Dam Vega (JPN) 1990	Antique Value (USA); 1979	Moonscape	Brazen (Family 9-f)
