= Kurifuji =

Japanese-bred Thoroughbred racehorse

Kurifuji クリフジ
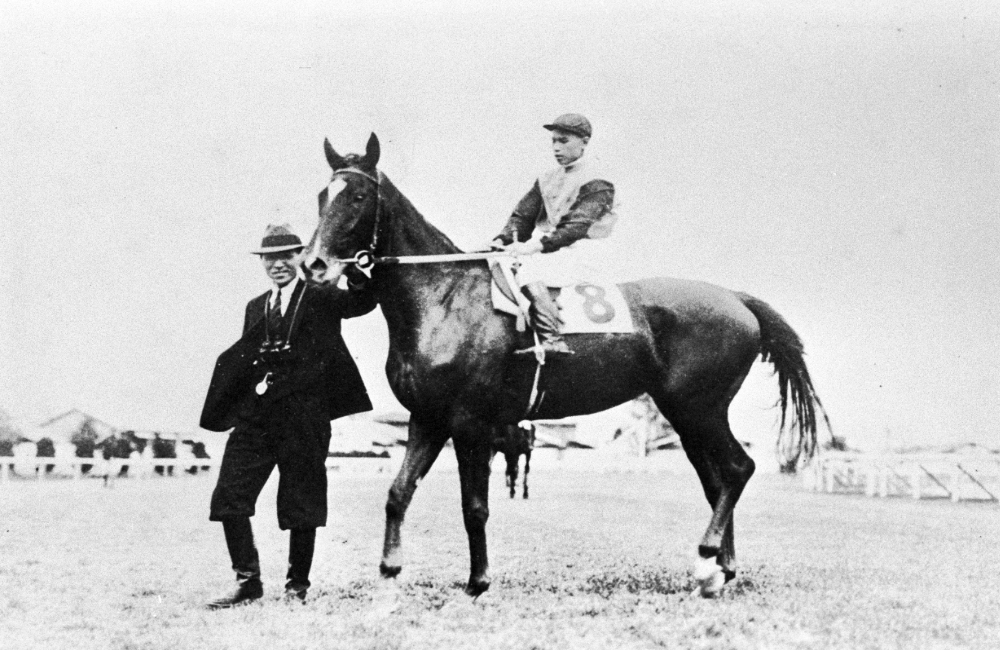
- Breed: Thoroughbred
- Sire: Tournesol (GB)
- Grandsire: Gainsborough
- Dam: Kenfuji (JPN)
- Damsire: Chapel Brampton (GB)
- Sex: Mare
- Foaled: 10 March 1940
- Country: Japan
- Colour: Chestnut
- Breeder: Goryō ranch Shimousa
- Owner: Kuribayashi Yuuzi
- Trainer: Ogata Tokichi
- Record: 11: 11 wins
- Earnings: 44,200 yen

Major wins
- Japanese Classic Race wins: Tokyo Yūshun (1943); Yushun Himba (1943); Kikuka Shō (1943)

Honours
- Japan Racing Association Hall of Fame inductee

Kurifuji (Japanese: クリフジ; Hepburn: Kurifuji; 10 March 1940 – c. 1964), also known as Toshifuji, was an undefeated Thoroughbred racemare, whose three classic wins included the Tokyo Yūshun race or Japanese Derby.

She was a chestnut mare that was bred at the Shimofusa Stud in Japan. Kurifuji was by the five-time leading sire, Tournesol (GB), and her dam Kenfuji was by the imported sire, Chapel Brampton (GB). She was a sister to three other horses including Happy Might who won the Tenno Sho, autumn race over 3,200 metres.

== Racing record ==
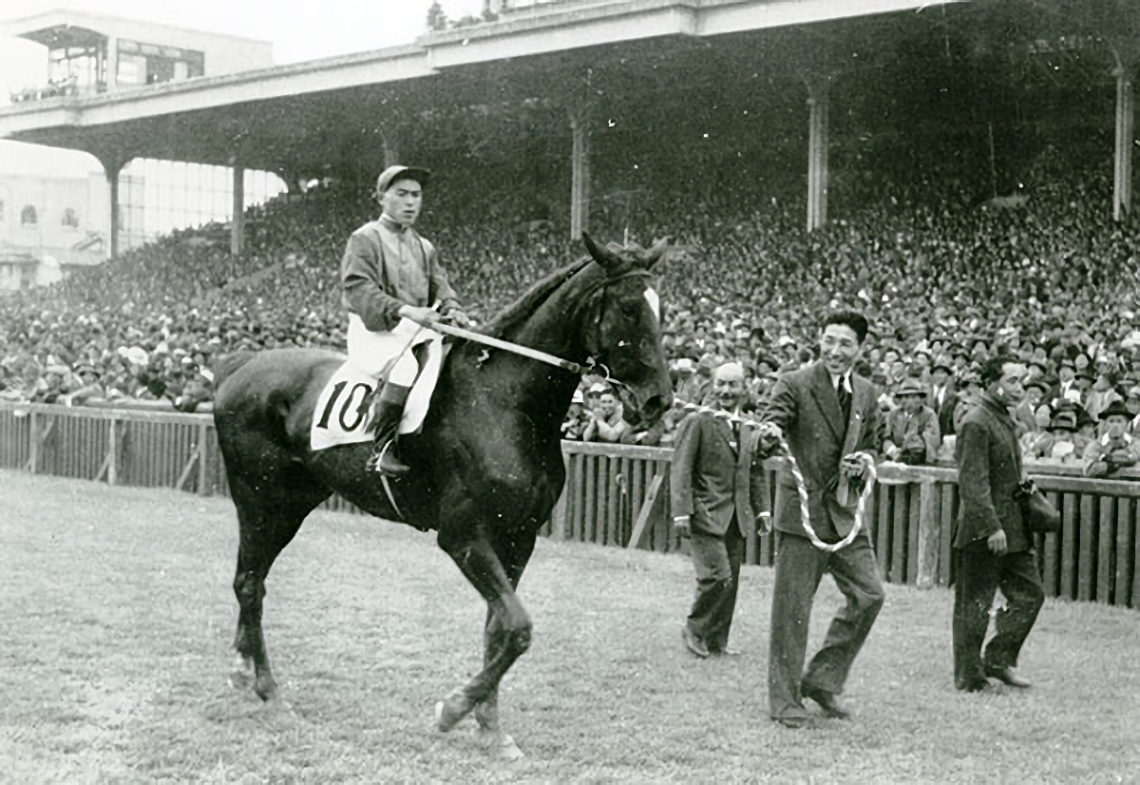
Jockey Maeda Chokichi and Kurifuji won the Tōkyō Yūshun (Japanese Derby), June 6th 1943

In 1943 Kurifuji was only the second filly to win the Japanese Derby after Hisatomo had done so in 1937. This race attracts top quality horses and many Japanese champions have won it including Deep Impact, Narita Brian, Shinzan and Symboli Rudolf. Kurifuji also won the 1943 Yushun Himba (Japanese Oaks) and 1943 Kikuka Shō (Japanese St. Leger). Racing in Japan, she had a total of 11 wins for 11 starts.

== Breeding career ==
Known as Kurifuji during her racing career, she was known as Toshifuji as a broodmare. Her progeny won 55 races and included:

- 1946 colt, Tohanofuji, by Shian Mor, won 15 races
- 1949 colt, Theft Y by Theft (IRE), won 8 races
- 1950 filly, Ichijo by Theft (IRE), won 7 races
- 1951 filly, Yamaichi by Toshishiro, won 5 races including the Yushun Himba and Oka Sho (Japanese 1,000 Guineas) etc.
- 1953 colt, Homaremon by Greylord won 5 races
- 1954 colt, Fuji-O by Greylord won 6 races
- 1958 filly, Mejirofuji by Greylord, won 2 races
- 1961 colt, Sugaya Homare by Turks Reliance, won 7 races.

Kurifuji, or Toshifuji as she was then known, died in 1964.

In 1984 Kurifuji was inducted into the Japan Racing Association Hall of Fame.

== Pedigree ==
Pedigree of Kurifuji (JPN), chestnut mare, 1940
Sire Tournesol (GB) Bay 1922	Gainsborough; Bay 1915	Bayardo	Bay Ronald
Sire Tournesol (GB) Bay 1922	Gainsborough; Bay 1915	Bayardo	Galicia
Sire Tournesol (GB) Bay 1922	Gainsborough; Bay 1915	Rosedrop	St. Frusquin
Sire Tournesol (GB) Bay 1922	Gainsborough; Bay 1915	Rosedrop	Rosaline
Sire Tournesol (GB) Bay 1922	Soliste (FR); 1910	Prince William (GB)	Bill of Portland
Sire Tournesol (GB) Bay 1922	Soliste (FR); 1910	Prince William (GB)	La Vierge
Sire Tournesol (GB) Bay 1922	Soliste (FR); 1910	Sees (FR)	Chesterfield
Sire Tournesol (GB) Bay 1922	Soliste (FR); 1910	Sees (FR)	La Goulue
Dam Kenfuji (JPN) Chestnut 1926	Chapel Brampton (GB); Chestnut 1912	Beppo	Marco
Dam Kenfuji (JPN) Chestnut 1926	Chapel Brampton (GB); Chestnut 1912	Beppo	Pitti
Dam Kenfuji (JPN) Chestnut 1926	Chapel Brampton (GB); Chestnut 1912	Mesquite	Sainfoin
Dam Kenfuji (JPN) Chestnut 1926	Chapel Brampton (GB); Chestnut 1912	Mesquite	St. Silave
Dam Kenfuji (JPN) Chestnut 1926	Tanemitsu (JPN); Chestnut 1919	Rushcutter	Persimmon
Dam Kenfuji (JPN) Chestnut 1926	Tanemitsu (JPN); Chestnut 1919	Rushcutter	Curbstone
Dam Kenfuji (JPN) Chestnut 1926	Tanemitsu (JPN); Chestnut 1919	Dai 2 Astonishment (JPN)	Intagurio (GB)
Dam Kenfuji (JPN) Chestnut 1926	Tanemitsu (JPN); Chestnut 1919	Dai 2 Astonishment (JPN)	Astonishment (GB) ( Family: 7-c)

== See also ==
- List of leading Thoroughbred racehorses
