= Tōkyō Yūshun =

Tokyo Yushun (Japanese Derby) 東京優駿 (日本ダービー)
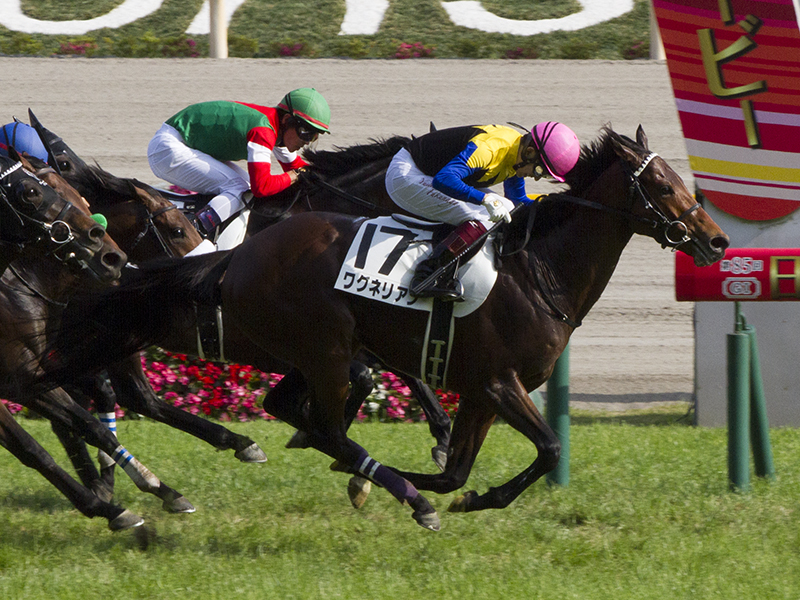
- Wagnerian in the 85th Japanese Derby
- Class: Grade 1
- Location: Tokyo Racecourse; Fuchū, Tokyo
- Inaugurated: 24 April 1932 (94 years ago)
- Race type: Thoroughbred flat racing

Race information
- Distance: 2400 meters (About 12 furlongs or 1 1/2 miles)
- Record: 2:21.9 ; Do Deuce (2022)
- Surface: Turf
- Track: Left-handed
- Qualification: Three-years-old Colts & Fillies
- Weight: 57 kg Allowances; 2 kg for fillies
- Purse: ¥ 756,500,000 (as of 2027): 1st: ¥ 350,000,000; 2nd: ¥ 140,000,000; 3rd: ¥ 88,000,000
- Bonuses: Classic Triple Crown; Winner of Satsuki Shō, Tōkyō Yūshun and Kikuka Shō ¥ 300,000,000

The Tōkyō Yūshun (東京優駿), also called the Japanese Derby (日本ダービー, Nippon Dābī), is a Japanese Grade 1 flat race for three-year-old thoroughbred colts and fillies. It is run over a distance of 2,400 metres (approximately 1 mile 4 furlongs) at the Tokyo Racecourse, Fuchū, Tokyo in late May or early June.

== History ==
The Tōkyō Yūshun was first contested in 1932 as Tōkyō Yūshun Daikyōsō (東京優駿大競走) over a distance of 2,400 metres at Meguro Racecourse in Meguro, Tokyo, and two years later it was staged at Tokyo Racecourse over a distance of 2,400 metres in 1934. It is the Japanese equivalent of the English Epsom Derby. It is the second leg of the Japanese Triple Crown, preceded by the Satsuki Shō (the Japanese equivalent of the English 2,000 Guineas) in mid-to-late April and followed by the Kikuka Shō (the Japanese equivalent of the English St. Leger Stakes) in mid-late October.

Since 2010, the Japanese Derby (along with several other JRA Japanese Domestic Grade 1 races, including the other Japanese classics such as the Satsuki Sho and the Kikuka Sho) is open to international competition due to Japan's inclusion in the IFHA's International Cataloguing Standards Part I category, in which all graded black-type races in the JRA calendar are open to international competition.

Races prior to 2001 (along with the other Japanese Classics) were only limited to Japanese-bred horses. Since 2001, foreign-bred horses are allowed, but until 2010 this race (and the other classics) were only limited to Japanese-trained horses. Since 2010, up to 9 foreign-trained or bred horses can enter the race.

== Step races ==
Trial races provide automatic berths to the winning horses or placed horses as specified.

Race Name	Class	Racecourse	Distance	Condition
Satsuki Sho	GI	Nakayama	2,000 meters	Top 5 horses
Aoba Sho	GII	Tokyo	2,400 meters	Top 2 horses
Principal Stakes	L	Tokyo	2,000 meters	Winner

If horses from the National Association of Racing win any 3-year-old JRA Grade 2 or 3 races before the Derby, they will be eligible to enter the Japanese Derby if ranked high enough in prize money. The Kyoto Shimbun Hai and NHK Mile Cup provides priority-entry-rights if these horses place first or second.

Race Name	Class	Racecourse	Distance
NHK Mile Cup	GI	Tokyo	1,600 meters
Kyoto Shimbun Hai	GII	Kyoto	2,200 meters

The Satsuki Sho, Aoba Sho and the Principal Stakes are the official trial races for the Japanese Derby. The top five finishers in the Satsuki Sho, the top two finishers in the Aoba Sho and the winner of the Principal Stakes are guaranteed a place in the field for the Derby, regardless of prize money. Overall, there are eight automatic qualifying spots in the Derby; the other 10 entries are "at-large" horses determined by prize money earned prior to racing in the Derby. The Kyoto Shimbun Hai is officially considered a step race and only gives priority-entry-rights to horses registered with the NAR. The NHK Mile Cup, the only non-Triple Crown three-year-old GI horse race, is also a step race but only provides priority-entry-rights to horses registered with the NAR, has gained importance in recent years as horses such as Tanino Gimlet, King Kamehameha and Deep Sky participated in the race and would eventually win the Derby.

== Records ==
- Fastest winning time : 2:21.9 – Do Deuce (2022)
- Slowest winning time : 2:45 2/5 – Wakataka (1932)

Leading jockey(s) :

- 6 – Yutaka Take : Special Week (1998), Admire Vega (1999), Tanino Gimlet (2002), Deep Impact (2005), Kizuna (2013), Do Deuce (2022)

Leading trainer(s) :

- 8 – Tokichi Ogata : Flame Mor (1934), Tokumasa (1936), Kurifuji (1943), Kurino Hana (1952), Haku Chikara (1956), Hakusho (1961), Meizui (1963), Lucky Ruler (1977)

Leading owner(s) :

- 5 – Sunday Racing : Orfevre (2011), Deep Brillante (2012), Duramente (2015), Shahryar (2021), Croix du Nord (2025)

== Winners since 1984 ==
Year	Winner	Jockey	Trainer	Owner	Time
1984	Symboli Rudolf	Yukio Okabe	Yuji Nohira	Symboli Bokujo	2:29.3
1985	Sirius Symboli	Kazuhiro Kato	Toshio Nihonyanagi	Tomohiro Wada	2:31.0
1986	Dyna Gulliver	Sueo Masuzawa	Kichisaburo Matsuyama	Shadai Race Horse Co., Ltd.	2:28.9
1987	Merry Nice	Yasuhiro Nemoto	Teruo Hashimoto	Fusako Ura	2:27.8
1988	Sakura Chiyono O	Futoshi Kojima	Katsutaro Sakai	Sakura Commerce Co., Ltd.	2:26.3
1989	Winner's Circle	Hiroyuki Gohara	Yasuhisa Matsuyama	Hiroshi Kuriyama	2:28.8
1990	Ines Fujin	Eiji Nakano	Shuho Kato	Masaaki Kobayashi	2:25.3
1991	Tokai Teio	Takayuki Yasuda	Shoichi Matsumoto	Masanori Uchimura	2:25.9
1992	Mihono Bourbon	Sadahiro Kojima	Tameo Toyama	Mihono International Co., Ltd.	2:27.8
1993	Winning Ticket	Masato Shibata	Yuji Ito	Yoshimi Ota	2:25.5
1994	Narita Brian	Katsumi Minai	Masaaki Okubo	Hidenori Yamaji	2:25.7
1995	Tayasu Tsuyoshi	Sadahiro Kojima	Akio Tsurudome	Kanichi Yokose	2:27.3
1996	Fusaichi Concorde	Shinji Fujita	Minoru Kobayashi	Fusao Sekiguchi	2:26.1
1997	Sunny Brian	Naohiro Onishi	Senji Nakao	Moriyasu Miyazaki	2:25.9
1998	Special Week	Yutaka Take	Toshiaki Shirai	Hiroyoshi Usuda	2:25.8
1999	Admire Vega	Yutaka Take	Mitsuru Hashida	Riichi Kondo	2:25.3
2000	Agnes Flight	Hiroshi Kawachi	Hiroyuki Nagahama	Takao Watanabe	2:26:2
2001	Jungle Pocket	Koichi Tsunoda	Sakae Watanabe	Yomoji Saito	2:27.0
2002	Tanino Gimlet	Yutaka Take	Kunihide Matsuda	Yuzo Tanimizu	2:26.2
2003	Neo Universe	Mirco Demuro	Tsutomu Setoguchi	Shadai Race Horse Co., Ltd.	2:28.5
2004	King Kamehameha	Katsumi Ando	Kunihide Matsuda	Makoto Kaneko	2:23.3
2005	Deep Impact	Yutaka Take	Yasuo Ikee	Makoto Kaneko	2:23.3
2006	Meisho Samson	Mamoru Ishibashi	Tsutomu Setoguchi	Yoshio Matsumoto	2:27.9
2007	Vodka	Hirofumi Shii	Katsuhiko Sumii	Yuzo Tanimizu	2:24.5
2008	Deep Sky	Hirofumi Shii	Mitsugu Kon	Toshio Fukami	2:26.7
2009	Logi Universe	Norihiro Yokoyama	Kiyoshi Hagiwara	Masaaki Kumeta	2:33.7
2010	Eishin Flash	Hiroyuki Uchida	Hideaki Fujiwara	Toyomitsu Hirai	2:26.9
2011	Orfevre	Kenichi Ikezoe	Yasutoshi Ikee	Sunday Racing	2:30.5
2012	Deep Brillante	Yasunari Iwata	Yoshito Yahagi	Sunday Racing	2:23.8
2013	Kizuna	Yutaka Take	Shozo Sasaki	Shinji Maeda	2:24.3
2014	One and Only	Norihiro Yokoyama	Kojiro Hashiguchi	Koji Maeda	2:24.6
2015	Duramente	Mirco Demuro	Noriyuki Hori	Sunday Racing	2:23.2
2016	Makahiki	Yuga Kawada	Yasuo Tomomichi	Kaneko Makoto Holdings	2:24.0
2017	Rey de Oro	Christophe Lemaire	Kazuo Fujisawa	Carrot Farm Co., Ltd.	2:26.9
2018	Wagnerian	Yuichi Fukunaga	Yasuo Tomomichi	Kaneko Makoto Holdings	2:23.6
2019	Roger Barows	Suguru Hamanaka	Katsuhiko Sumii	Hirotsugu Inokuma	2:22.6
2020	Contrail	Yuichi Fukunaga	Yoshito Yahagi	Shinji Maeda	2:24.1
2021	Shahryar	Yuichi Fukunaga	Hideaki Fujiwara	Sunday Racing	2:22.5
2022	Do Deuce	Yutaka Take	Yasuo Tomomichi	Kieffers Co., Ltd.	2:21.9
2023	Tastiera	Damian Lane	Noriyuki Hori	Carrot Farm Co., Ltd.	2:25.2
2024	Danon Decile	Norihiro Yokoyama	Shogo Yasuda	Danox Co., Ltd.	2:24.3
2025	Croix du Nord	Yuichi Kitamura	Takashi Saito	Sunday Racing	2:23.7
2026	Lovcen	Kohei Matsuyama	Haruki Sugiyama	Forest Racing	2:22.7

== Earlier winners ==
- 1932 - Wakataka
- 1933 - Kabutoyama
- 1934 - Flame Mor
- 1935 - Governor
- 1936 - Tokumasa
- 1937 - Hisatomo
- 1938 - Sugenuma
- 1939 - Kumohata
- 1940 - Ieryu
- 1941 - St. Lite
- 1942 - Minami Homare
- 1943 - Kurifuji
- 1944 - Kaiso
- 1945 - No race
- 1946 - No race
- 1947 - Matsu Midori
- 1948 - Miharu O
- 1949 - Tachikaze
- 1950 - Kumono Hana
- 1951 - Tokino Minoru
- 1952 - Kurino Hana
- 1953 - Bostonian
- 1954 - Golden Wave
- 1955 - Otokitsu
- 1956 - Haku Chikara
- 1957 - Hikaru Meiji
- 1958 - Daigo Homare
- 1959 - Komatsu Hikari
- 1960 - Kodama
- 1961 - Hakusho
- 1962 - Fair Win
- 1963 - Meizui
- 1964 - Shinzan
- 1965 - Keystone
- 1966 - Teito O
- 1967 - Asa Denko
- 1968 - Tanino Harromore
- 1969 - Daishin Volgard
- 1970 - Tanino Moutiers
- 1971 - Hikaru Imai
- 1972 - Long Ace
- 1973 - Take Hope
- 1974 - Colonel Lancer
- 1975 - Kaburaya O
- 1976 - Climb Kaiser
- 1977 - Lucky Ruler
- 1978 - Sakura Shori
- 1979 - Katsurano Haiseiko
- 1980 - Opec Horse
- 1981 - Katsu Top Ace
- 1982 - Bamboo Atlas
- 1983 - Mr. C.B.

== See also ==
- Horse racing in Japan
- List of Japanese flat horse races
