= Dream Journey =

Japanese-bred thoroughbred racehorse

Dream Journey ドリームジャーニー
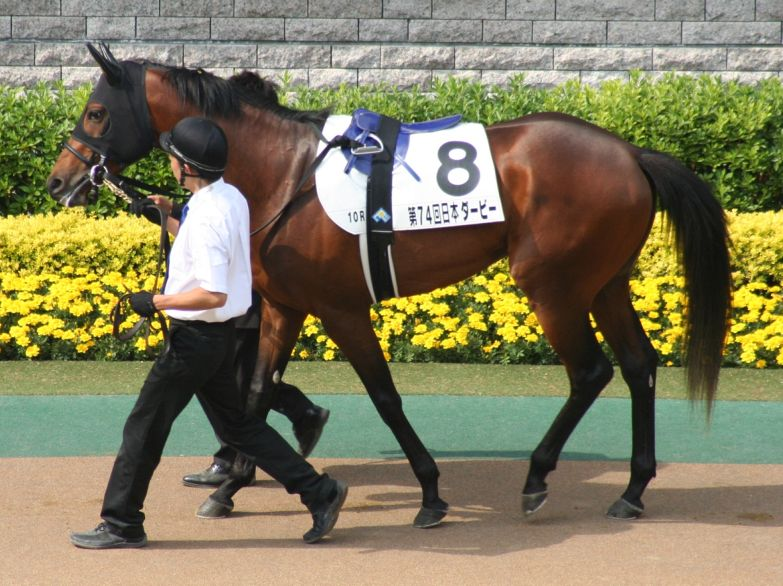
- Dream Journey at the paddock of the 2007 Tōkyō Yūshun.
- Breed: Thoroughbred
- Sire: Stay Gold (JPN)
- Grandsire: Sunday Silence (USA)
- Dam: Oriental Art (JPN)
- Damsire: Mejiro McQueen (JPN)
- Sex: Stallion
- Foaled: February 24, 2004 (age 22); Shiraoi, Hokkaido
- Country: Japan
- Colour: Bay
- Breeder: Shadai Corporation Shiraoi Farm
- Owner: Sunday Racing
- Racing colours
- Trainer: Yasutoshi Ikee
- Jockey: Masayoshi Ebina; Yutaka Take; Kenichi Ikezoe
- Record: 31: 9-3-5
- Earnings: ¥847,973,000

Major wins
- Asahi Hai Futurity Stakes (2006); Kobe Shimbun Hai (2007); Kokura Kinen (2008); Challenge Cup (2008); Sankei Ōsaka Hai (2009); Takarazuka Kinen (2009); Arima Kinen (2009)

Awards
- JRA Award for Best Two-Year-Old Colt (2006); JRA Award for Best Older Male Horse (2009)

Dream Journey (Japanese: ドリームジャーニー, Hepburn: Dorīmu Jānī; foaled February 24, 2004) is a retired Japanese Thoroughbred racehorse and sire. He won the 2006 Asahi Hai Futurity Stakes, as well as the 2009 Takarazuka and Arima Kinen. Dream Journey's full brother is Orfevre, the winner of the 2011 Japanese Triple Crown.

== Background ==
Dream Journey's dam, Oriental Art, sired by Mejiro McQueen, won three races, mostly in dirt races, out of 23 career runs. Dream Journey's sire, Stay Gold (sired by Sunday Silence) won 7 races in his 50-race career, including the Hong Kong Vase. Stay Gold started his stud career in 2003, and thus was among the second crop.

The horse's name is lifted from his sire's Hong Kong name, 黄金旅程, which can be translated literally to "Golden Journey".

During his training, it quickly became apparent that Dream Journey had inherited his sire's bad temperament. One of his stable's assistants, Shoichi Yamashita, recalled Dream Journey often had to visit the vet from "his acts of mischievousness", and the horse was considered more difficult to interact with than his younger brother Orfevre, another horse with an infamous reputation for his temper. Dream Journey's later-main jockey, Kenichi Ikezoe, said he begged for a different horse after their first interaction shortly before their first race together at the 2008 Yasuda Kinen.

== Racing Career ==
=== 2006: Two-year old season ===
Dream Journey made his debut and first victory on a maiden race at the Niigata Racecourse with Masayoshi Ebina as his jockey, and also won the next race, the Fuyou Stakes. Dream Journey made his Group race debut at that year's Tokyo Sports Hai Nisai Stakes, but came in third behind Fusaichi Ho O after lagging behind in the race. At the Asahi Hai Futurity Stakes he once again went out of the gate late, but passed the other horses on the final stretch, clinching his first group race victory. At 416 kg, Dream Journey was the lightest horse to have ever won this race. He had a small build and sharp legs that he made great use on the final stretch, and covered the last three furlongs the fastest of all horses in all four races that he ran that season.

His victory at the Asahi Hai Futurity Stakes earned him the 2006 JRA Award for the Best Two-Year Old Colt.

=== 2007: Three-year old season ===
Dream Journey started the season with the Yayoi Sho, where he was the 2nd most favored after Shinzan Kinen winner Admire Aura. He ran most of the race among the pack, and attempted to take the lead on the final stretch, but finished 3rd in part due to being blocked by other horses. At the Satsuki Sho, he finished 8th behind Victory, and later at the 74th Japanese Derby he finished 5th behind Vodka despite showing sharp legs on the final stretch.

After taking the Summer off, Dream Journey's first race in Autumn would be the Kobe Shimbun Hai, where for the first time his jockey became Yutaka Take, who had ridden his sire Stay Gold as well as his damsire Mejiro McQueen before. At the race, the horse placed itself in the rear and passed the other horses on the final stretch, winning his second group race. Dream Journey would then compete in the 68th Kikuka Sho, where the horse was the second-most favored. Dream Journey would start pushing up from around the 3rd corner after placing itself in the furthest back of the pack, but was unable to catch up with the horses in front of him, and finished 5th behind Asakusa Kings.

It was originally planned that Dream Journey would then enter either the Hong Kong Vase or the Hong Kong Cup, but the plans were quickly dropped as the quarantine would have taken a month due to the ongoing Equine Influenza.

Dream Journey was briefly put out to pasture at the Greenwood Training before returning to his stable to run in the Naruo Kinen. He was the most favored for the first time in his career, but finished at 8th place. Dream Journey would return to Greenwood via Shimagami Farm for the remainder of the year.

=== 2008: Four-year old season ===
Dream Journey returned to his stable at the Ritto Training Center on April 4, and started his season at the Yomiuri Milers Cup. However, he came out of the gate late, and finished at 14th place. His next race, the Yasuda Kinen, saw Kenichi Ikezoe be the horse's jockey for the first time, but finished at 10th place.

The next race, the Kokura Kinen on August 3, was originally planned with Take returning as his jockey, but as he was suspended for an unrelated incident, Ikezoe continued to ride the horse for that race. Dream Journey won its first race since the Kobe Shimbun Hai after catching up to Daishin Grow who had emerged from the pack before Dream Journey.

Dream Journey went on to compete in the Asahi Challenge Cup where he would win with a 3/4-length against Toho Alan. Dream Journey did not win any more races that season, with the horse finishing in 10th place at the Tenno Sho (Autumn) and the Arima Kinen at 4th.

=== 2009: Five-year old season ===
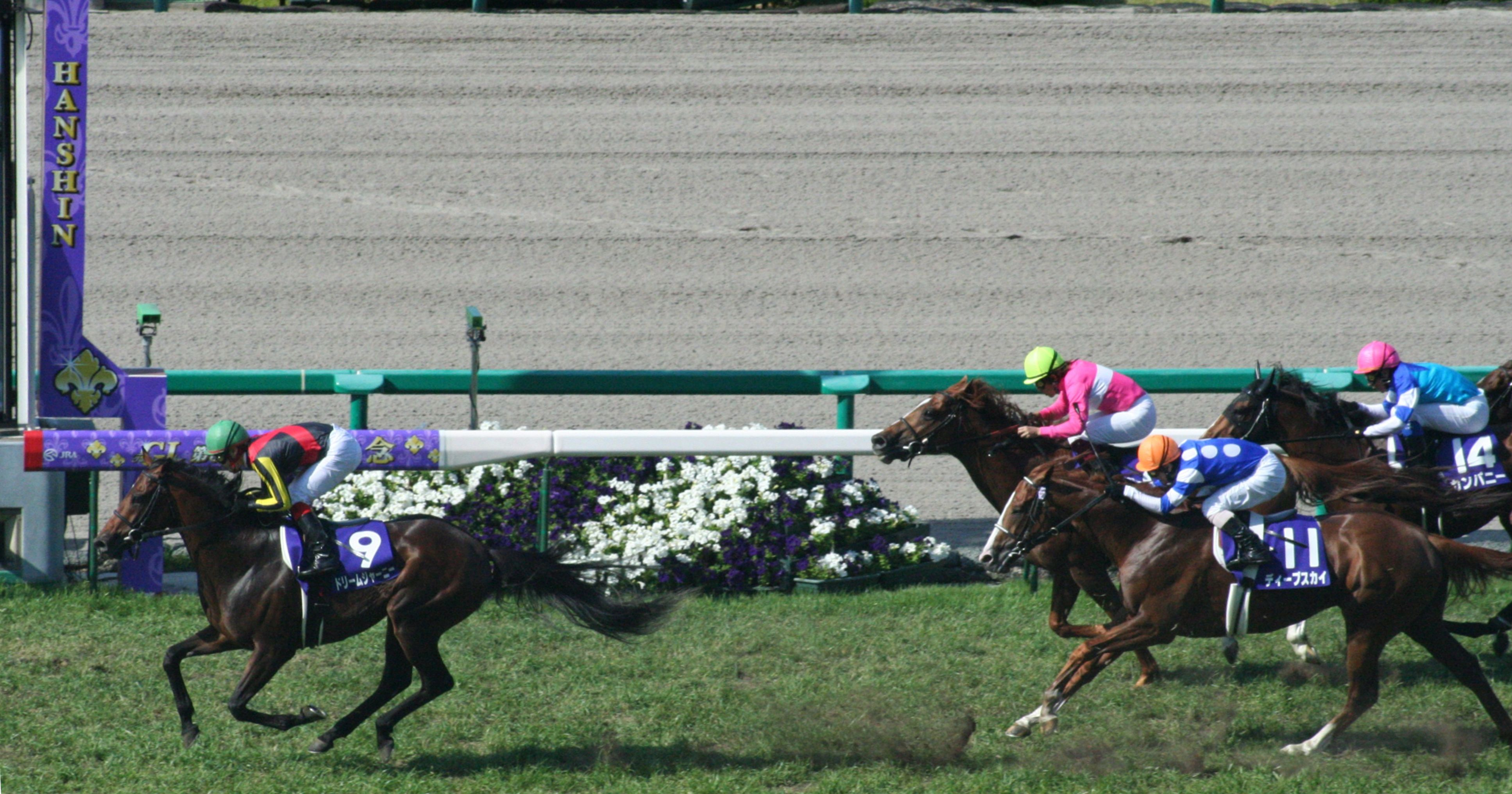
Dream Journey winning the 50th Takarazuka Kinen

Dream Journey started his five-year old season with the American Jockey Club Cup on January 25, where he was the most favored but finished at 8th place. At the Nakayama Kinen the horse came in 2nd place behind Company in spite its best efforts to catch up to the leading horse. Later, at the Sankei Ōsaka Hai he was the 3rd most favored, and after taking the lead on the last two furlongs, the most-favored Deep Sky tried to pass him, but he managed to keep the lead, marking his 5th group race win.

It was originally planned for Dream Journey to compete in the Takarazuka Kinen as its main goal after running in the Kinko Sho, but as his conditions were very well it was decided to enter the horse into the Tenno Sho (Spring) instead. This was his first long-distance race since the Kikuka Sho, but as the horses that ran in front initially couldn't keep up their speed, Dream Journey was able to come in from the outside and managed to come in 3rd place.

At Takarazuka, Deep Sky was by far the most favored of that race, and Dream Journey entered the race as the second most favored. Dream Journey stayed in the pack during the early stage of the race as Cosmo Bulk took the lead by a wide margin, with the horse taking the lead on the final stretch and not letting Deep Sky and Sakura Mega Wonder overtake the horse, marking the first GI win in 2 1/2 years.

After a break, Dream Journey was the most favored horse of the Sankei Sho All Comers, but was unable to catch up to Matsurida Gogh, who won that race whereas Dream Journey came in 2nd place.

At Tenno Sho (Autumn), Dream Journey entered the race as the 4th most favored behind Vodka, Shingen, and Oken Bruce Lee. The horse raced from behind the pack but came in 6th place behind Company.

On December 27, Dream Journey ran in the 54th Arima Kinen. As the race started in a high pace with the first 900 meters being covered in just 52.2 seconds, Dream Journey slowly pushed up from the rear, and passed Buena Vista on the final stretch and passing the finishing line, winning the very race that both Stay Gold and Mejiro McQueen could not.

Dream Journey became the 6th horse since 1984 to win both so-called Grand Prixs (Takarazuka and Arima) after Inari One (1989), Mejiro Palmer (1992), Grass Wonder (1999), T M Opera O (2000), and Deep Impact (2006). Dream Journey's weight at the time of the race, 426 kg, was smaller than Deep Impact's weight of 438 kg from 2006, making him the lightest winner of Arima since 1984. Yasuo Ikee, father of Yasutoshi who was Dream Journey's trainer, also trained Deep Impact, also making this the first time ever for the Grands Prix to be won by both father and son.

Dream Journey's victories at both Takarazuka and Arima won the horse that year's JRA Award for Best Older Male Horse.

=== 2010: Six-year old season ===
Dream Journey started the season with the Kyoto Kinen, where the horse came in 3rd behind Buena Vista. The horse then went on to compete in the Osaka Hai as the most favored, but came in 3rd place behind T M Encore.

Dream Journey was scheduled to run in the Tenno Sho (Spring), but plans were dropped on April 24 after it was discovered that there was a minor swelling on the fetlock of the right forearm. The horse was later entered in to the Takarazuka Kinen in hopes of repeating the victory from the year before. He was the fourth most favored, and tried to pass the other horses from the rear on the final stretch, but wound up coming in fourth place behind Nakayama Festa.

Dream Journey would go on to run in the All Comers on September 26, where he could not catch up to Shingen, who won that race. After not running in the Tenno Sho (Fall) due to problems with the hinds, the horse ran in that year's Arima Kinen but finished in 13th place.

=== 2011: Seven-year old season ===
Dream Journey started the season off with the Osaka Sho, but finished 9th. Later, Dream Journey would once again run in Takarazuka, only finishing in 10th place. After the race, Ikee told reporters that the horse "lost its fighting spirit" and announced his intentions to retire the horse, and Dream Journey's registration with the JRA was withdrawn as of June 30. A retirement ceremony was held on September 19 at the Sapporo Racecourse.

== Stud career ==
Dream Journey arrived at Shadai Stallion Station on July 7, 2011, and started his stud career from 2012. His stud fee for that years was 2,000,000 JPY. Dream Journey mated with 95 mares, but was bad at mating due to the horse's small build, resulting in only 36 foals being registered as race horses. Dream Journey continued to mate with 50 to 70 mares each season until 2015, but that number dropped after an accident in 2016 where the horse broke its bone during mating season. Dream Journey's first crops debuted in 2015.

=== Notable progeny ===
c = colt, f = filly, g = gelding

Foaled	Name	Sex	Major Wins
2013	Miraieno Tsubasa	c	Diamond Stakes
2014	Dreams Line	c	Shuntei Sho, Tokai Derby, Gifu Kinsho
2017	Weltreisende	c	Nikkei Shinshun Hai, Naruo Kinen
2018	Through Seven Seas	f	Nakayama Himba Stakes

== In popular culture ==
An anthropomorphized version of Dream Journey appears as a character in the Japanese multimedia franchise Umamusume: Pretty Derby, voiced by Mayu Yoshioka. She is depicted as a petite, seemingly affable honor student who is highly secretive. Her personality can be attributed to that of a yakuza member, such as valuing loyalty to her family above all else, and concealing a darker scheming and manipulative nature with a tendency of being violently protective of the player trainer and her younger sister Orfevre, who often entrusts her with managing her monthly activity schedule. She is part of a friend group composed of people like her who admire Stay Gold called the "Gold Clan", which includes Gold Ship, Nakayama Festa, Orfevre, and Fenomeno, all of whose real-world counterparts are progenies of Stay Gold himself.

== Race statistics ==
- All races Dream Journey participated in were held on turf tracks.

Date	Racecourse	Race	Grade	Distance (condition)	Entry	HN	Odds (Favored)	Finish	Time	Margins	Jockey	Winner (Runner-up)
2006 – two-year-old season
3 Sep	Niigata	2yo DBT		1400 m (Firm)	18	15	7.1 (2)	1st	1:23.8	0.0	Masayoshi Ebina	(Descoberta)
30 Sep	Nakayama	Fuyo Stakes		1600 m (Firm)	13	6	6.7 (3)	1st	1:35.2	-0.2	Masayoshi Ebina	(Rose Otto)
18 Nov	Tokyo	Tokyo Sports Hai Nisai Stakes	G3	1800 m (Firm)	12	8	3.7 (2)	3rd	1:48.8	0.1	Masayoshi Ebina	Fusaichi Ho O
10 Dec	Nakayama	Asahi Hai Futurity Stakes	G1	1600 m (Firm)	15	3	6.7 (2)	1st	1:34.4	-0.1	Masayoshi Ebina	(Laurel Guerreiro)
2007 – three-year-old season
4 Mar	Nakayama	Yayoi Sho	G2	2000 m (Firm)	14	7	4.4 (2)	3rd	2:00.8	0.3	Masayoshi Ebina	Admire Aura
15 Apr	Nakayama	Satsuki Sho	G1	2000 m (Firm)	18	6	8.5 (3)	8th	2:00.5	0.6	Masayoshi Ebina	Victory
17 May	Tokyo	Tokyo Yushun	G1	2400 m (Firm)	18	8	32.8 (8)	5th	2:25.4	0.9	Masayoshi Ebina	Vodka
23 Sep	Hanshin	Kobe Shimbun Hai	G2	2400 m (Firm)	15	14	4.2 (3)	1st	2:24.7	-0.1	Yutaka Take	(Asakusa King)
21 Oct	Kyoto	Kikuka Sho	G1	3000 m (Firm)	18	16	5.5 (2)	5th	3:05.6	0.5	Yutaka Take	Asakusa King
8 Dec	Hanshin	Naruo Kinen	G3	1800 m (Firm)	16	12	2.8 (1)	8th	1:47.8	0.3	Yutaka Take	Higher Game
2008 – four-year-old season
19 Apr	Hanshin	Yomiuri Milers Cup	G2	1600 m (Firm)	15	15	6.0 (2)	14th	1:35.0	1.4	Yutaka Take	Company
8 Jun	Tokyo	Yasuda Kinen	G1	1600 m (Firm)	18	18	42.3 (11)	10th	1:33.9	1.2	Kenichi Ikezoe	Vodka
3 Aug	Kokura	Kokura Kinen	G3	2000 m (Firm)	15	3	4.2 (2)	1st	1:57.9	-0.5	Kenichi Ikezoe	(Daishin Grow)
15 Sep	Hanshin	Challenge Cup	G3	2000 m (Firm)	13	7	1.7 (1)	1st	1:58.5	-0.1	Kenichi Ikezoe	(Toho Alan)
2 Nov	Tokyo	Tenno Sho (Autumn)	G1	2000 m (Firm)	17	17	14.6 (4)	10th	1:58.0	0.8	Kenichi Ikezoe	Vodka
28 Dec	Nakayama	Arima Kinen	G1	2500 m (Firm)	14	11	24.1 (7)	4th	2:31.9	0.4	Kenichi Ikezoe	Daiwa Scarlet
2009 – five-year-old season
25 Jan	Nakayama	American Jockey Club Cup	G2	2200 m (Firm)	13	11	3.2 (1)	8th	2:15.2	1.3	Kenichi Ikezoe	Never Bouchon
1 Mar	Nakayama	Nakayama Kinen	G2	1800 m (Good)	10	5	6.2 (4)	2nd	1:49.2	0.0	Kenichi Ikezoe	Company
5 Apr	Hanshin	Osaka Hai	G2	2000 m (Firm)	12	8	6.9 (3)	1st	1:59.7	0.0	Kenichi Ikezoe	Deep Sky
3 May	Kyoto	Tenno Sho (Spring)	G1	3200 m (Firm)	18	12	14.6 (4)	3rd	3:14.7	0.3	Kenichi Ikezoe	Meiner Kitz
28 Jun	Hanshin	Takarazuka Kinen	G1	2200 m (Firm)	14	9	7.1 (2)	1st	2:11.3	-0.3	Kenichi Ikezoe	(Sakura Mega Wonder)
27 Sep	Nakayama	Sankei Sho All Comers	G2	2200 m (Firm)	15	9	2.6 (10)	2nd	2.11.7	0.3	Kenichi Ikezoe	Matsurida Gogh
1 Nov	Tokyo	Tenno Sho (Autumn)	G1	2000 m (Firm)	18	12	10.7 (4)	6th	1:58.0	0.8	Kenichi Ikezoe	Company
27 Dec	Nakayama	Arima Kinen	G1	2500 m (Firm)	16	9	4.0 (2)	1st	2:30.0	-0.1	Kenichi Ikezoe	Buena Vista
2010 – six-year-old season
20 Feb	Kyoto	Kyoto Kinen	G2	2200 m (Firm)	13	7	3.5 (2)	3rd	2:14.7	0.3	Kenichi Ikezoe	Buena Vista
4 Apr	Hanshin	Osaka Hai	G2	2000 m (Firm)	12	8	1.2 (1)	3rd	1:59.6	0.1	Kenichi Ikezoe	T M Encore
27 Jun	Hanshin	Takarazuka Kinen	G1	2200 m (Good)	17	18	7.8 (4)	4th	2:13.3	0.3	Kenichi Ikezoe	Nakayama Festa
26 Sep	Nakayama	Sankei Sho All Comers	G2	2200 m (Firm)	10	3	2.4 (1)	2nd	2:11.4	0.0	Kenichi Ikezoe	Shingen
26 Dec	Nakayama	Arima Kinen	G1	2500 m (Firm)	15	12	12.1 (4)	13th	2:33.8	1.2	Kenichi Ikezoe	Victoire Pisa
2011 – seven-year-old season
3 Apr	Hanshin	Osaka Hai	G2	2000 m (Firm)	15	7	5.5 (4)	9th	1:58.9	1.1	Kenichi Ikezoe	Hiruno d'Amour
26 Jun	Hanshin	Takarazuka Kinen	G1	2200 m (Firm)	16	10	15.6 (7)	10th	2:11.5	1.4	Kenichi Ikezoe	Earnestly

== Pedigree ==
Pedigree of Dream Journey
Sire Stay Gold	Sunday Silence	Halo	Hail to Reason
Sire Stay Gold	Sunday Silence	Halo	Cosmah
Sire Stay Gold	Sunday Silence	Wishing Well	Understanding
Sire Stay Gold	Sunday Silence	Wishing Well	Mountain Flower
Sire Stay Gold	Golden Sash	Dictus	Sanctus
Sire Stay Gold	Golden Sash	Dictus	Dronic
Sire Stay Gold	Golden Sash	Dyna Sash	Northern Taste
Sire Stay Gold	Golden Sash	Dyna Sash	Royal Sash
Dam Oriental Art	Mejiro McQueen	Mejiro Titan	Mejiro Asama
Dam Oriental Art	Mejiro McQueen	Mejiro Titan	Cheryl
Dam Oriental Art	Mejiro McQueen	Mejiro Aurora	Remand
Dam Oriental Art	Mejiro McQueen	Mejiro Aurora	Mejiro Iris
Dam Oriental Art	Electro Art	Northern Taste	Northern Dancer
Dam Oriental Art	Electro Art	Northern Taste	Lady Victoria
Dam Oriental Art	Electro Art	Grandma Stevens	Lt. Stevens
Dam Oriental Art	Electro Art	Grandma Stevens	Dhow

Dream Journey, as well as its full brother Orfevre, has a 4x3 inbreeding of Northern Taste, meaning that the horse's name shows up twice in the pedigree.
