= Yūichi Shikato =

Japanese racehorse trainer

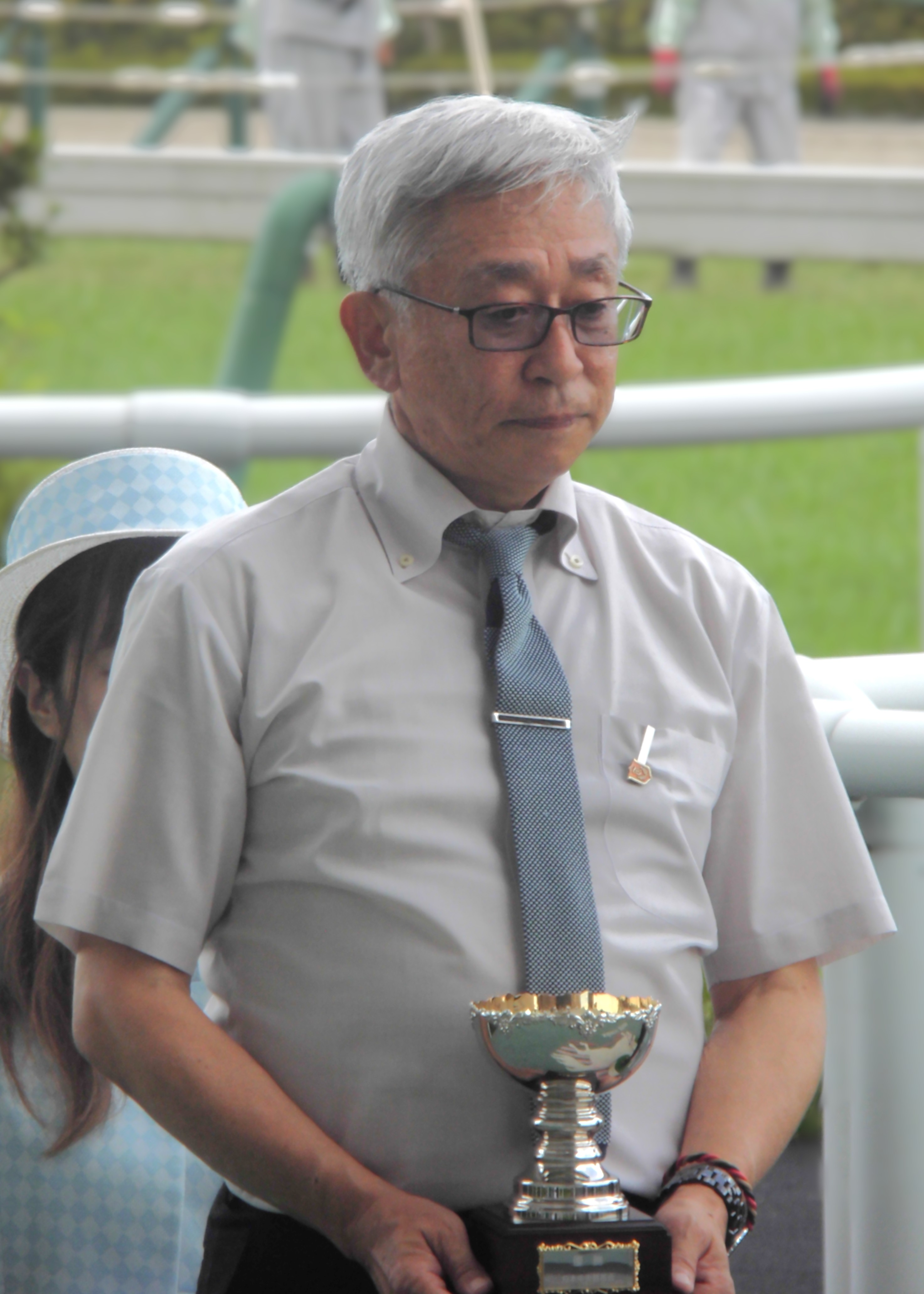
- Shikato in 2024

Personal information
- Native name: 鹿戸雄一
- Born: May 23, 1962 (age 64) Hokkaido, Japan

Horse racing career
- Sport: Horse racing

Significant horses
- Screen Hero, Efforia, Win Carnelian

Yūichi Shikato (鹿戸雄一) is retired jockey and Japanese racehorse trainer.

== Biography ==
Shikato was born to father Tadao, a farm worker in the Hidaka area of Hokkaido, and mother Toshiko in May 1962. Having grown up in and around horses, with his distant relatives including Yukiharu Shikato, another jockey, and Akira Shikato, known for jockeying Ten Point, his desire to also becoming a jockey grew.

Shikato debuted in March 1984. He was originally slated to debut on a maiden race on March 3, but after the horse he was supposed to ride was scratched, his debut was pushed back a day to a maiden race held on March 4 at Nakayama Racecourse. Shikato would be win his first graded race in 1991 when he won the Tamatsubaki Kinen with Yodono Chikara.

Shikato started to struggle with his weight in the 2000s, and started to consider changing to become a horse trainer, when Kazuo Fujisawa invited to teach him the basics, and was also invited to travel to the United Kingdom with Zenno Rob Roy, who ran the International Stakes in 2005.

In 2007, Shikato earned his trainer license and retired from being a jockey.

Shikato opened his stable the following year, and that same year he won his first graded race and Grade I race with Screen Hero, a horse Shikato inherited from Susumu Yano's stable, who won both the Copa Republica Argentina and Japan Cup that year.

On September 28, 2025, Win Carnelian won the Sprinters Stakes, marking the first Grade I victory for both the horse and jockey Kosei Miura.

== Major wins ==
- Arima Kinen - Efforia (2021)
- Japan Cup - Screen Hero (2008)
- Satsuki Shō - Efforia (2021)
- Sprinters Stakes - Win Carnelian (2025)
- Tennō Shō (Autumn) - Efforia (2021)

== Personal life ==
Shikato's daughter is a tarento who is married to Kiwamu Ogino, a JRA jockey.
