= Oken Bruce Lee =

Japanese Thoroughbred racehorse

Oken Bruce Lee オウケンブルースリ
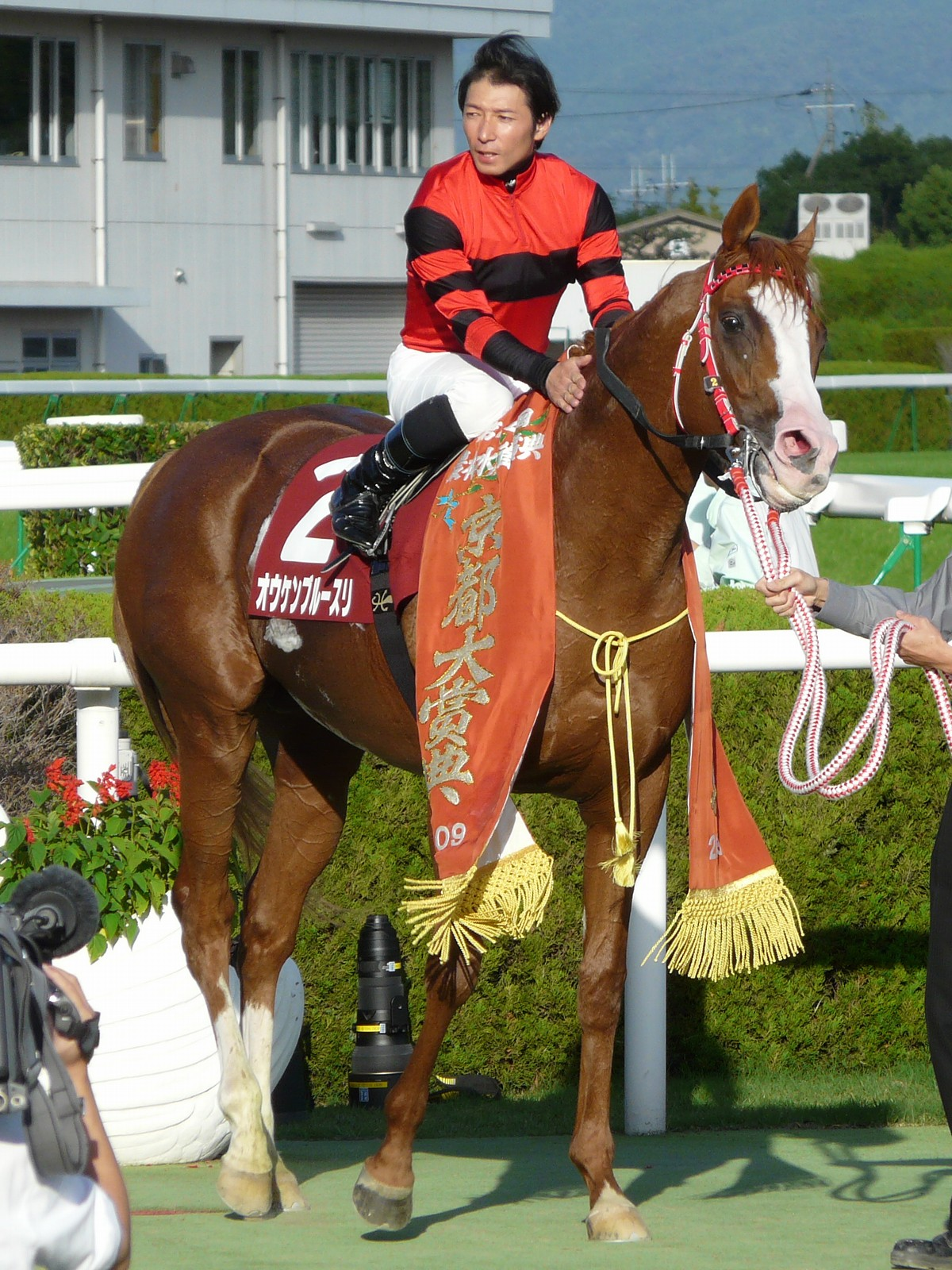
- Oken Bruce Lee after winning the Kyoto Daishoten in 2009
- Breed: Thoroughbred
- Sire: Jungle Pocket
- Grandsire: Tony Bin
- Dam: Silver Joy
- Damsire: Silver Deputy
- Sex: Stallion
- Foaled: 24 February 2005
- Died: 9 September 2026 (aged 21)
- Country: Japan
- Color: Chestnut
- Breeder: Northern Farm
- Owner: Akira Fukui
- Racing colours
- Trainer: Hidetaka Otonashi
- Jockey: Hiroyuki Uchida
- Record: 27: 5-5-2
- Earnings: ¥503,863,000

Major wins
- Kyoto Daishoten (2009); Japanese Classic Race wins: Kikuka-shō (2008)

Oken Bruce Lee (オウケンブルースリ, 24 February 2005 - September 9 2026) was a Japanese Thoroughbred racehorse who won the Kikuka-shō in 2008.

== Background ==
Oken Bruce Lee was foaled by Silver Joy and was born on February 24, 2005 at Northern Farm. His sire, Jungle Pocket, was a Japanese racehorse known for winning both the Tōkyō Yūshun (Japanese Derby) and the Japan Cup in 2001. His damsire, Silver Deputy, was a Canadian racehorse who became a major sire in North America. Moreover, his grandsire, Tony Bin, was an Irish racehorse who became a leading sire in Japan, known for siring other Japanese racehorses such as Air Groove, North Flight, and Winning Ticket (another Derby winner).

He was purchased for 30,000,000 yen by Akira Fukui at the 2005 JRHA July Select Sale and was named after his favorite actor, Bruce Lee.

== Racing Record ==
Oken Bruce Lee raced in a total of 27 starts. During his racing career, he won five and was also in 2nd place five times. The table below shows his racing career taken from netkeiba.

Date	Race	Grade	Distance	Surface	Track	Field	Finish	Time	Margin	Jockey	Winner (Runner-up)
2008 – three-year-old season
Apr 26	3YO MAIDEN		2000m	Turf	Fukushima	12	2nd	2:03.5	0.0	Yuichi Kitamura	Dream Elements
May 17	3YO MAIDEN		2000m	Turf	Niigata	11	5th	2:02.8	0.3	Yuichi Kitamura	Eiden Dance
Jun 8	3YO MAIDEN		2000m	Turf	Chukyo	18	1st	2:00.0	-0.7	Yuichi Kitamura	(Lord Flash)
Jun 21	Ikuta Tokubetsu	ALW (1 Win)	2400m	Turf	Hanshin	10	1st	2:28.0	0.0	Yutaka Take	(Copanu Jingu)
Aug 23	Aganogawa Tokubetsu	ALW (2 Win)	2200m	Turf	Niigata	12	1st	2:11.9	-0.4	Hiroyuki Uchida	(Destramente)
Sep 28	Kobe Shimbun Hai	G2	2400m	Turf	Hanshin	18	3rd	2:25.4	0.1	Hiroyuki Uchida	Deep Sky
Oct 26	Kikuka-shō	G1	3000m	Turf	Kyoto	18	1st	3:05.7	-0.2	Hiroyuki Uchida	(Flotation)
Nov 30	Japan Cup	G1	2400m	Turf	Tokyo	17	5th	2:25.8	0.3	Hiroyuki Uchida	Screen Hero
2009 – four-year-old season
Mar 22	Hanshin Daishōten	G2	3000m	Turf	Hanshin	12	7th	3:14.4	1.2	Hiroyuki Uchida	Asakusa Kings
Oct 11	Kyōto Daishōten	G2	2400m	Turf	Kyoto	14	1st	2:24.3	-0.1	Hiroyuki Uchida	(Smart Gear)
Nov 1	Tennō Shō (Autumn)	G1	2000m	Turf	Tokyo	18	4th	1:58.0	0.8	Hiroyuki Uchida	Company
Nov 30	Japan Cup	G1	2400m	Turf	Tokyo	18	2nd	2:22.4	0.0	Hiroyuki Uchida	Vodka
2010 – five-year-old season
Oct 10	Kyōto Daishōten	G2	2400m	Turf	Kyoto	10	2nd	2:25.1	0.1	Hiroyuki Uchida	Meisho Beluga
Nov 2	Japan Cup	G1	2400m	Turf	Tokyo	18	7th	2:25.4	0.2	Christophe Lemaire	Rose Kingdom
Dec 26	Arima Kinen	G1	2500m	Turf	Nakayama	15	11th	2:33.7	1.1	Norihiro Yokoyama	Victoire Pisa
2011 – six-year-old season
Feb 13	Kyōto Kinen	G2	2200m	Turf	Kyoto	12	7th	2:15.1	1.2	Hiroyuki Uchida	To the Glory
Mar 20	Hanshin Daishōten	G2	3000m	Turf	Hanshin	13	8th	3:05.4	1.0	Suguru Hamanaka	Namura Crescent
May 1	Tennō Shō (Spring)	G1	3200m	Turf	Kyoto	18	10th	3:21.9	1.3	Suguru Hamanaka	Hiruno d'Amour
Oct 9	Kyōto Daishōten	G2	2400m	Turf	Kyoto	8	3rd	2:24.3	0.2	Suguru Hamanaka	Rose Kingdom
Nov 6	Copa Republica Argentina	G2	2500m	Turf	Tokyo	18	2nd	2:31.7	0.2	Hironobu Tanabe	Trailblazer
Nov 27	Japan Cup	G1	2400m	Turf	Tokyo	16	10th	2:25.0	0.8	Masayoshi Ebina	Buena Vista
2012 – seven-year-old season
Feb 18	Diamond Stakes	G3	3400m	Turf	Tokyo	16	14th	3:38.1	1.3	Hironobu Tanabe	Keiai Dosojin
Mar 18	Hanshin Daishōten	G2	3000m	Turf	Hanshin	12	8th	3:14.4	2.6	Katsumi Ando	Gustave Cry
Oct 8	Kyōto Daishōten	G2	2400m	Turf	Kyoto	13	2nd	2:23.4	0.0	Suguru Hamanaka	Meisho Kampaku
Nov 4	Copa Republica Argentina	G2	2500m	Turf	Tokyo	15	7th	2:31.1	1.2	Suguru Hamanaka	Lelouch
Nov 25	Japan Cup	G1	2400m	Turf	Tokyo	17	14th	2:24.9	1.8	Suguru Hamanaka	Gentildonna
Dec 23	Arima Kinen	G1	2500m	Turf	Nakayama	16	14th	2:34.4	2.5	Hironobu Tanabe	Gold Ship

== Stud record ==
Oken Bruce Lee stood as a stud at East Stud, located in Urakawa Town. He had conceptions with 74 mares, produced 56 foals in which 54 were registered as racehorses with 366,839,000 ¥ total earnings and AEI of 0.52. He had one progeny with graded race winner which is Oken Moon who won the Kyodo Tsushin Hai in 2018. He retired as a stud in 2023 and was pensioned at Urakawa Yushun Village AERU.

== Death ==
On 9th of September, Oken Bruce Lee died at age 21 due to respiratory failure from pneumonia at Urakawa Yushun Village AERU.

== Pedigree ==
Pedigree of Oken Bruce Lee, chestnut horse, 2005
Sire Jungle Pocket 1998	Tony Bin; 1983	Kampala	Kalamoun
Sire Jungle Pocket 1998	Tony Bin; 1983	Kampala	State Pension
Sire Jungle Pocket 1998	Tony Bin; 1983	Severn Bridge	Hornbeam
Sire Jungle Pocket 1998	Tony Bin; 1983	Severn Bridge	Priddy Fair
Sire Jungle Pocket 1998	Dance Charmer; 1990	Nureyev	Northern Dancer
Sire Jungle Pocket 1998	Dance Charmer; 1990	Nureyev	Special
Sire Jungle Pocket 1998	Dance Charmer; 1990	Skillful Joy	Nodouble
Sire Jungle Pocket 1998	Dance Charmer; 1990	Skillful Joy	Skillful Miss
Dam Silver Joy 1993	Silver Deputy; 1985	Deputy Minister	Vice Regent
Dam Silver Joy 1993	Silver Deputy; 1985	Deputy Minister	Mint Copy
Dam Silver Joy 1993	Silver Deputy; 1985	Silver Valley	Mr. Prospector
Dam Silver Joy 1993	Silver Deputy; 1985	Silver Valley	Seven Valleys
Dam Silver Joy 1993	Joy of Myrtlewood; 1984	Northern Jove	Northern Dancer
Dam Silver Joy 1993	Joy of Myrtlewood; 1984	Northern Jove	Junonia
Dam Silver Joy 1993	Joy of Myrtlewood; 1984	Myrtlewood Lass	Ribot
Dam Silver Joy 1993	Joy of Myrtlewood; 1984	Myrtlewood Lass	Gold Digger
