= Screen Hero =

Japanese-bred Thoroughbred racehorse

Screen Hero スクリーンヒーロー
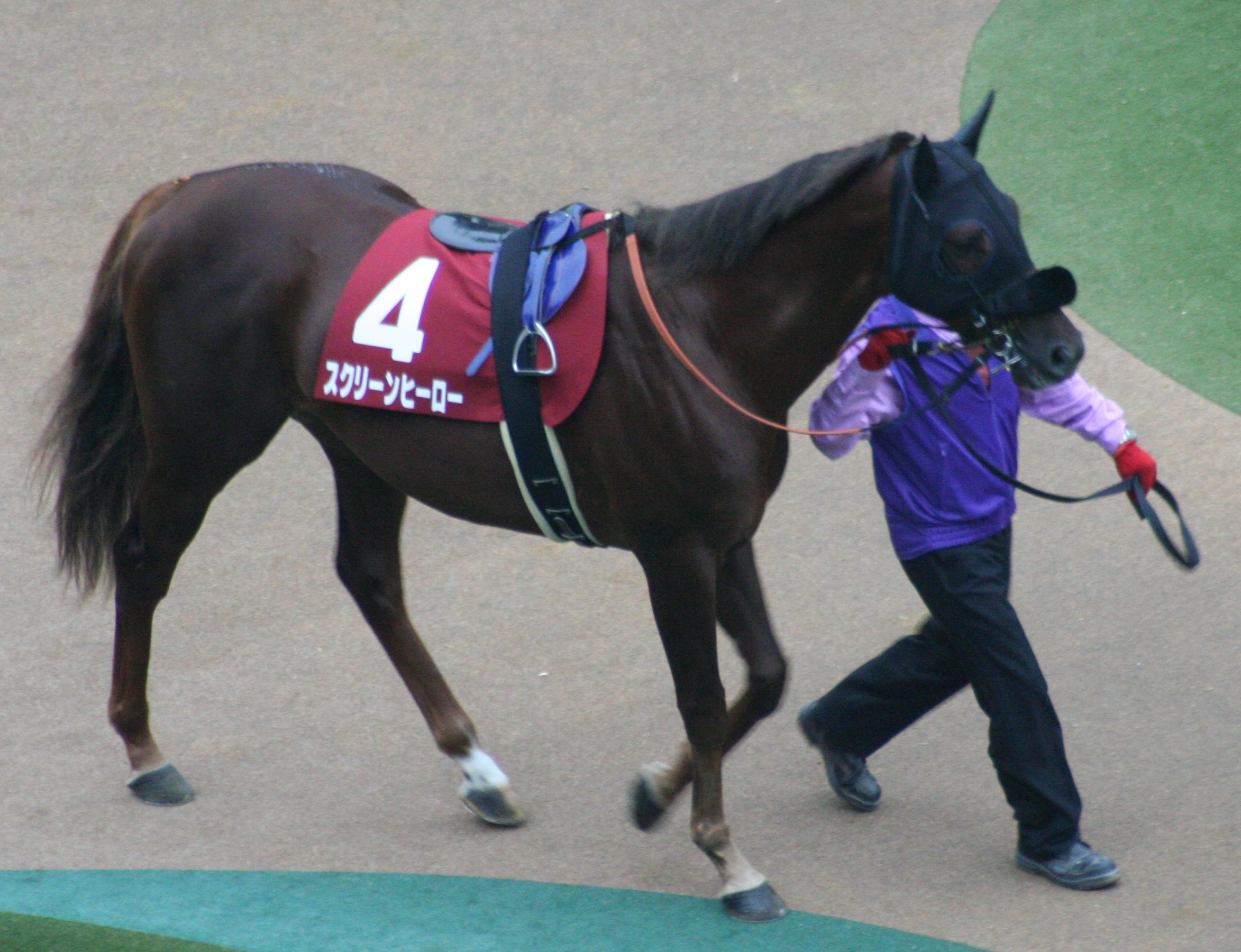
- Screen Hero at Tokyo Racecourse in November 2008
- Breed: Thoroughbred
- Sire: Grass Wonder
- Grandsire: Silver Hawk
- Dam: Running Heroine
- Damsire: Sunday Silence
- Sex: Stallion
- Foaled: 18 April 2004
- Country: Japan
- Colour: Chestnut
- Breeder: Shadai Farm
- Owner: Teruya Yoshida
- Racing colours
- Trainer: Susumu Yano; Yuichi Shikato
- Jockey: Hatsuhiro Kowata; Norihiro Yokoyama; Mirco Demuro
- Record: 23: 5-6-2
- Earnings: ¥503,403,000

Major wins
- Copa Republica Argentina (2008); Japan Cup (2008)

Awards
- JRA Award for Best Older Male Horse (2008)

Screen Hero (Japanese: スクリーンヒーロー, Hepburn: Sukurīn Hīrō; foaled 18 April 2004) is a Japanese retired Thoroughbred racehorse and former sire best known for winning the 2008 Japan Cup. In his first two seasons he showed above-average racing ability, winning two races and being placed at Grade II level but appeared to be some way behind the best horses in Japan. After a lengthy absence he emerged as a top-class racehorse as a four-year-old in 2008, winning the Grade II Copa Republica Argentina before recording a 40/1 upset victory in the Japan Cup. He failed to win in the following year and his racing career was ended by a serious leg injury at the end of the season. He has had early success as a breeding stallion.

== Background ==
Screen Hero is a chestnut horse with a white star and two white socks standing 15.3½ hands high, bred by the Yoshida family's Shadai Farm. He is one of the best horses sired by the Kentucky-bred stallion Grass Wonder whose wins included the Asahi Hai Futurity Stakes, the Takarazuka Kinen and two runnings of the Arima Kinen. Screen Hero's dam Running Heroine (a daughter of Sunday Silence) finished unplaced in both of her races in 1996. Running Heroine's dam Dyna Actress was a top-class racemare who won the Sprinters Stakes and was the JRA Award for Best Older Filly or Mare in 1987 and 1988. She was descended from the influential French-bred broodmare La Troienne.

During his racing career Screen Hero was owned by Teruya Yoshida and was initially trained by Susumu Yano.

== Racing career ==
=== 2006 & 2007: early career ===
As a juvenile, Screen Hero ran twice on the dirt in maiden races, finishing fourth over 1600 metres at Tokyo Racecourse and second over 1800 metres at Nakayama Racecourse.

Screen Hero raced eleven times and won two races as a three-year-old in 2007. On his seasonal debut he recorded his first victory when he won a maiden over 1800 metres on dirt at Nakayama in January, beating Berg Missile and fourteen others. In February he finished third at Tokyo and then won a minor race over 1600 metres at Nakayama. In March he was switched to turf and moved up in class for the Grade II Fuji TV Spring Stakes and finished fifth behind Flying Apple before competing on dirt for the last time and finishing second over 1800 metres at Nakyama. After being beaten in two races on turf at Tokyo he was moved back into Grade III class for the Radio Nikkei Sho at Fukushima Racecourse on 1 July and produced his best effort to date as he finished second of the sixteen runners behind the New Zealand-bred Roc de Cambes. In his two remaining races of 2007 he ran unplaced in the Grade III Niigata Kinen and finished third to Roc de Cambes in the Grade II St Lite Kinen over 2200 metres at Nakayama on 16 September. His performances had earned him a place in the Kikuka Sho in October but his season was ended by a fracture to his left foreleg.

=== 2008: four-year-old season ===
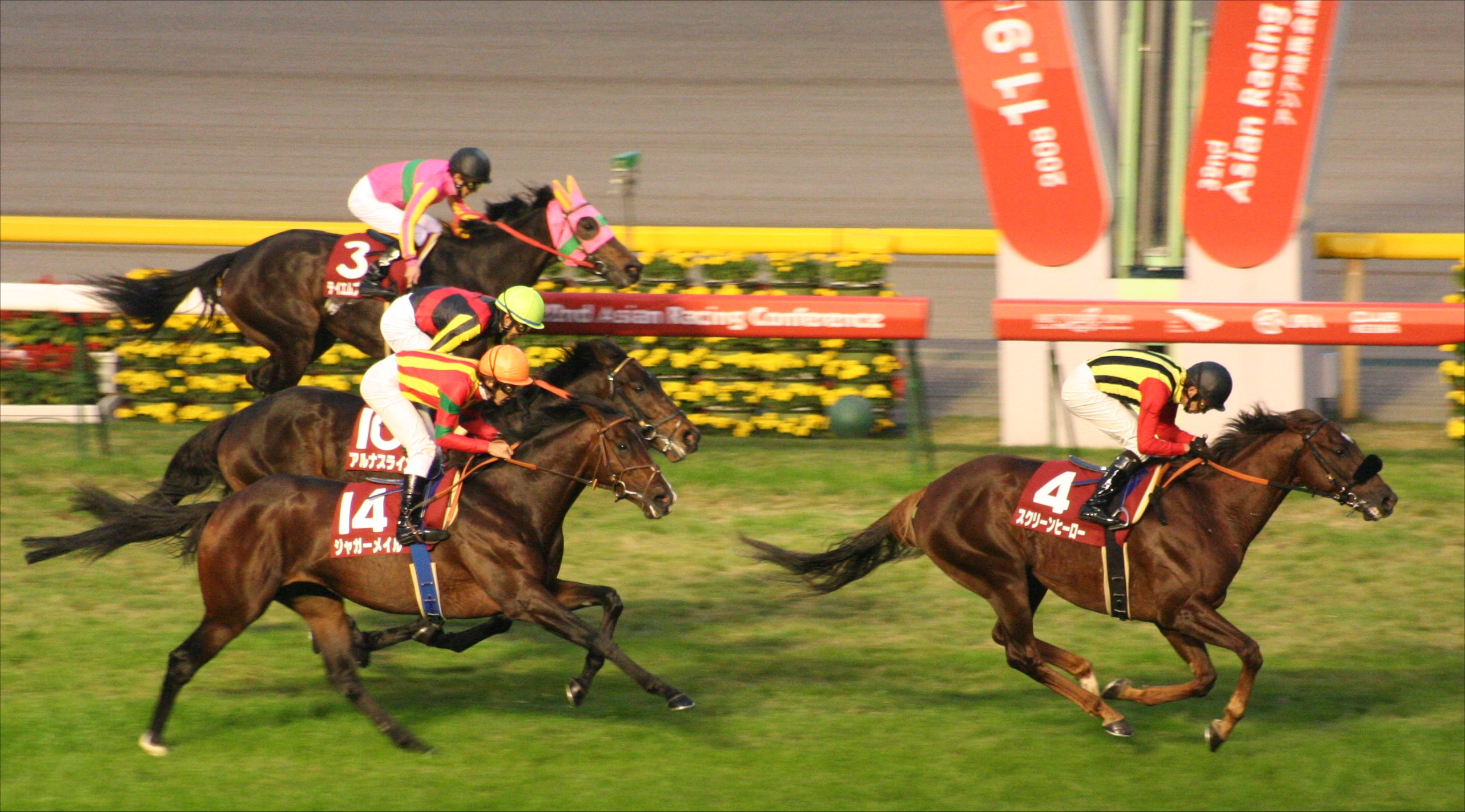
Screen Hero wins the Copa Republica Argentina

After a break of eleven months, Screen Hero returned in the Shikotsuko Tokubetsu over 2600 metres at Sapporo Racecourse on 16 August 2008 and recorded his best win up to that time as he defeated B B Falcon and nine others. In his next two races he finished second to Biennale over 2600 metres at Sapporo in September and was then beaten a nose by Jaguar Mail in the October Stakes over 2400 metres at Tokyo.

By late autumn, Susumu Yano had retired and Screen Hero entered the stable of the first-season trainer Yūichi Shikato. On 9 November he was ridden by Masayoshi Ebina when he contested the Copa Republica Argentina, a Grade II handicap race over 2500 metres at Tokyo. The colt recorded his first win at Graded level as he came home one and a half lengths clear of Jaguar Mail with Al Nasrain a neck away in third.

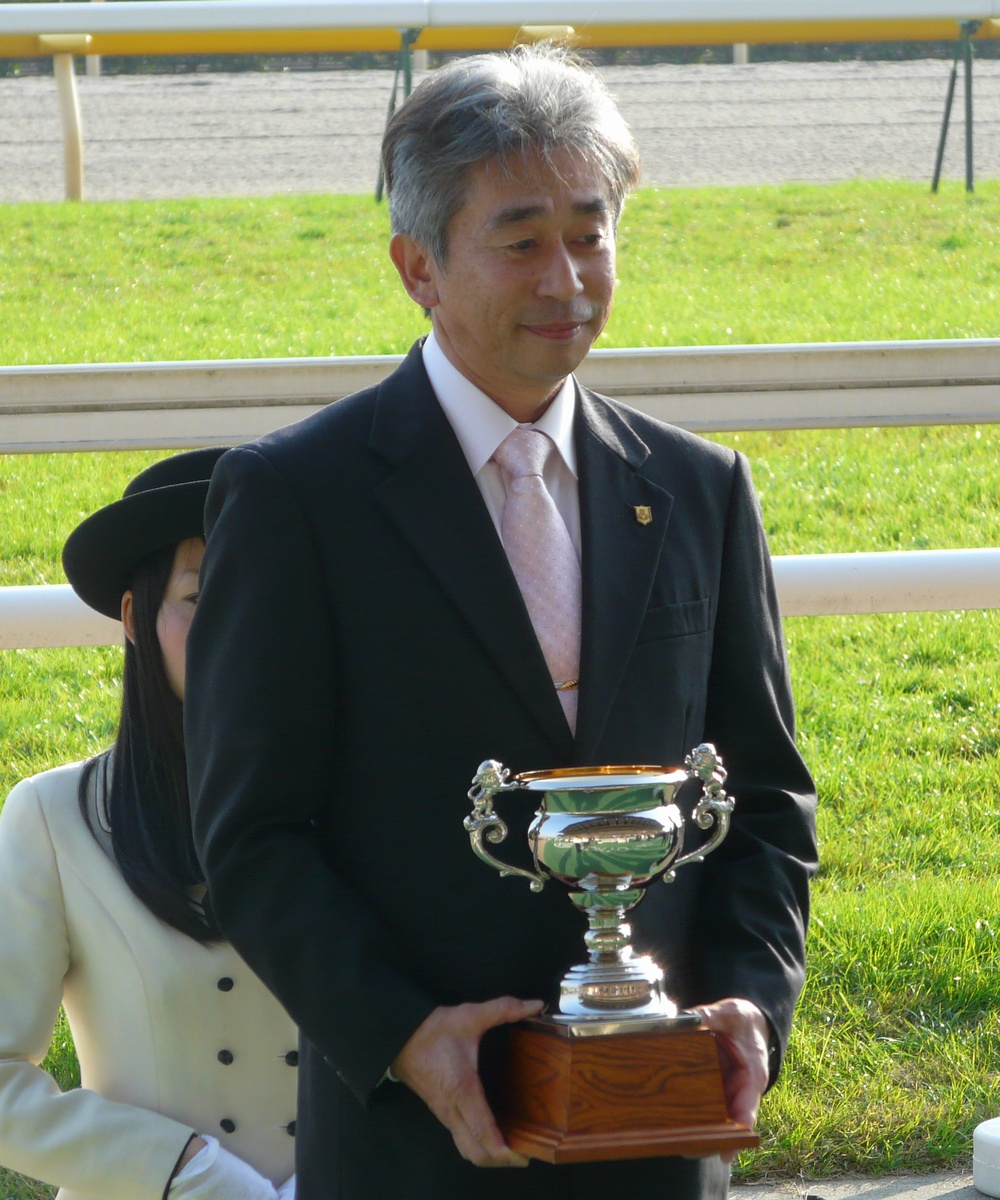
Yūichi Shikato, who trained Screen Hero to win the Japan Cup

On 30 November Screen Hero contested the 28th running of the Japan Cup in front of a 102,567 crowd at Tokyo and started a 40/1 outsider in a seventeen-runner field. Before the race Shikato commented "He's getting better with each race. He knows how to race, so I'm not particularly concerned about the draw. We're challengers here". The Tokyo Yushun winner Deep Sky started favourite ahead of the outstanding racemare Vodka. The overseas challenge was provided by the three British runners Papal Bull (King Edward VII Stakes, Princess of Wales's Stakes), Sixties Icon (St Leger) and Purple Moon (Ebor Handicap, runner-up in the Melbourne Cup). The other Japanese runners included Meisho Samson (Satsuki Sho, Tokyo Yushun, Tenno Sho), Oken Bruce Lee (Kikuka Sho), Asakusa Kings (Kikuka Sho) and Matsurida Gogh (Arima Kinen). Ridden by the Italian jockey Mirco Demuro Screen Hero tracked the leaders as the outsider Never Bouchon set a slow pace. Matsurida Gogh took the lead in the straight but Screen Hero produced a powerful late run to take the lead 150 metres from the post. In a blanket finish he won by half a length, three quarters of a length, a head and a neck from Deep Sky, Vodka, Matsurida Gogh and Oken Bruce Lee. After the race Demuro said "We had decided to mark Matsurida Gogh as he always gets a nice position. The only thing I had been concerned about was the start, but he broke well and the slow pace meant we could move in and get a good position easily... he is a very competitive horse. When he lines up with other horses, he really battles to stay ahead of them". Shikato commented "My heart was just pounding until he was over the finish line... With each race he seemed to rise to meet the level of his opponents".

On his final appearance of the season at Nakayama on 28 December, Screen Hero finished fifth behind the four-year-old filly Daiwa Scarlet in the Arima Kinen.

In January 2009, Screen Hero was voted Champion Japanese older male horse at the JRA Awards, taking 167 of 300 votes.

=== 2009: five-year-old season ===
Screen Hero remained in training as a five-year-old but failed to win in five races. In the spring he ran fourth behind Asakusa Kings in the Hanshin Daishoten and then finished down the field behind Meiner Kitz in the 3200 metres Tenno Sho. In the Takarazuka Kinen he started a 20/1 outsider and finished fifth, three lengths behind the winner Dream Journey. After a break of over four months he returned in November for the autumn edition of the Tenno Sho for which he started at odds of 30/1 in an eighteen-runner field. Ridden by Hiroshi Kitamura he produced his best effort of the season as he finished second to the eight-year-old Company with Vodka in third and Oken Bruce Lee, Dream Journey, Matsurida Gogh and Asakusa Kings among the unplaced horses. On his final run of the year, he attempted to repeat his 2008 success in the Japan Cup but finished thirteenth of the eighteen runners behind Vodka.

In December it was reported that Screen Hero had sustained a serious leg injury, described as a "bowed tendon" and would not race for at least nine months. In fact he never raced again and was retired to stud in 2010.

== Racing form ==
Screen Hero ran in 23 races and recorded five wins. The data available is based on JBIS and netkeiba.

Date	Track	Race	Grade	Distance (Condition)	Entry	HN	Odds (Favored)	Finish	Time	Margins	Jockey	Winner (Runner-up)
2006 – two-year-old season
Nov 26	Tokyo	2YO debut		1600m（Fast）	16	11	239.3（13）	4th	1:41.4	1.3	Hatsuhiro Kowata	Retsina
Dec 17	Nakayama	2YO maiden		1800m（Sloppy）	16	5	8.4（5）	2nd	1:56.0	0.6	Hatsuhiro Kowata	Gold Mine
2007 – three-year-old season
Jan 13	Nakayama	3YO maiden		1800m（Fast）	16	6	3.1（2）	1st	1:57.1	–0.7	Hatsuhiro Kowata	(Berg Missile)
Feb 11	Tokyo	Cattleya Sho	ALW (1W)	1600m（Fast）	16	3	25.2（8）	3rd	1:39.6	0.8	Hatsuhiro Kowata	Domingo City
Feb 25	Nakayama	3YO allowance	1W	1800m（Good）	9	6	2.4（1）	1st	1:56.4	0.0	Hatsuhiro Kowata	(Testa Rossa)
Mar 18	Nakayama	Spring Stakes	2	1800m（Firm）	11	3	110.5（10）	5th	1:49.5	0.5	Hatsuhiro Kowata	Flying Apple
Mar 31	Nakayama	Fukuryu Stakes	OP	1800m（Good）	10	9	22.7（7）	2nd	1:53.9	0.1	Hiroshi Kitamura	Meisho Aigle
May 5	Tokyo	Principal Stakes	OP	2000m（Firm）	13	10	19.7（8）	7th	2:00.4	0.8	Masayoshi Ebina	Golden Dahlia
Jun 9	Tokyo	Edelweiss Stakes	ALW (2W)	1600m（Firm）	17	5	25.0（8）	4th	1:34.4	0.3	Hatsuhiro Kowata	High Society
Jul 1	Fukushima	Radio Nikkei Sho	3	1800m（Firm）	16	7	62.6（14）	2nd	1:47.9	0.2	Shu Ishibashi	Roc de Cambes
Aug 26	Niigata	Niigata Kinen	3	2000m（Firm）	18	15	22.4（9）	16th	1:59.6	1.8	Shu Ishibashi	Yumeno Shirushi
Sep 16	Nakayama	St. Lite Kinen	2	2200m（Firm）	17	11	64.8（14）	3rd	2:12.7	0.7	Hatsuhiro Kowata	Roc de Cambes
2008 – four-year-old season
Aug 16	Sapporo	Shikotsuko Tokubetsu	ALW (2W)	2600m（Firm）	11	5	2.5（1）	1st	2:44.2	0.0	Norihiro Yokoyama	(B B Falcon)
Sep 7	Sapporo	Sapporo Nikkei Open	OP	2600m（Firm）	12	11	4.6（3）	2nd	2:42.4	0.4	Koshiro Take	Biennale
Oct 12	Tokyo	October Stakes	ALW (3W)	2400m（Firm）	16	16	5.1（2）	2nd	2:26.2	0.0	Norihiro Yokoyama	Jaguar Mail
Nov 9	Tokyo	Copa Republica Argentina	2	2500m（Firm）	16	4	8.9（3）	1st	2:30.8	–0.2	Masayoshi Ebina	(Jaguar Mail)
Nov 30	Tokyo	Japan Cup	1	2400m（Firm）	17	16	41.0（9）	1st	2:25.5	–0.1	Mirco Demuro	(Deep Sky)
Dec 28	Nakayama	Arima Kinen	1	2500m（Firm）	14	8	6.4（3）	5th	2:32.0	0.5	Mirco Demuro	Daiwa Scarlet
2009 – five-year-old season
Mar 22	Hanshin	Hanshin Daishoten	2	3000m（Soft）	12	10	4.0（3）	4th	3:14.0	0.8	Norihiro Yokoyama	Asakusa Kings
May 3	Kyoto	Tenno Sho (Spring)	1	3200m（Firm）	18	16	6.3（2）	14th	3:17.1	2.7	Norihiro Yokoyama	Meiner Kitz
Jun 28	Hanshin	Takarazuka Kinen	1	2200m（Firm）	14	10	21.4（6）	5th	2:11.8	0.5	Norihiro Yokoyama	Dream Journey
Nov 1	Tokyo	Tenno Sho (Autumn)	1	2000m（Firm）	18	2	31.4（7）	2nd	1:57.5	0.3	Hiroshi Kitamura	Company
Nov 29	Tokyo	Japan Cup	1	2400m（Firm）	18	18	7.5（4）	13th	2:25.5	2.1	Mirco Demuro	Vodka

Legend:
Turf Dirt

== Stud record ==
Screen Hero was retired from racing to become a breeding stallion. For the 2015 season he was based at the Lex Stud. His first two crops of foals included Maurice Gold Actor (Arima Kinen) and the Grade III winners Musee Alien and Guanciale.

=== Notable progeny ===
c = colt, f = filly, g = gelding

Foaled	Name	Sex	Major Wins
2011	Gold Actor	c	Arima Kinen
2011	Maurice	c	Yasuda Kinen, Mile Championship, Hong Kong Mile, Champions Mile, Tenno Sho (autumn), Hong Kong Cup
2017	Win Marilyn	f	Hong Kong Vase
2017	Win Carnelian	c	Sprinters Stakes

== Pedigree ==
Pedigree of Screen Hero (JPN), chestnut stallion, 2004
Sire Grass Wonder (USA) 1995	Silver Hawk (USA); 1979	Roberto	Hail To Reason
Sire Grass Wonder (USA) 1995	Silver Hawk (USA); 1979	Roberto	Bramalea
Sire Grass Wonder (USA) 1995	Silver Hawk (USA); 1979	Gris Vitesse	Amerigo
Sire Grass Wonder (USA) 1995	Silver Hawk (USA); 1979	Gris Vitesse	Matchiche
Sire Grass Wonder (USA) 1995	Ameriflora (USA); 1989	Danzig	Northern Dancer
Sire Grass Wonder (USA) 1995	Ameriflora (USA); 1989	Danzig	Pas de Nom
Sire Grass Wonder (USA) 1995	Ameriflora (USA); 1989	Graceful Touch	His Majesty
Sire Grass Wonder (USA) 1995	Ameriflora (USA); 1989	Graceful Touch	Pi Phi Gal
Dam Running Heroine (JPN) 1993	Sunday Silence (USA); 1986	Halo	Hail To Reason
Dam Running Heroine (JPN) 1993	Sunday Silence (USA); 1986	Halo	Cosmah
Dam Running Heroine (JPN) 1993	Sunday Silence (USA); 1986	Wishing Well	Understanding
Dam Running Heroine (JPN) 1993	Sunday Silence (USA); 1986	Wishing Well	Mountain Flower
Dam Running Heroine (JPN) 1993	Dyna Actress (JPN); 1983	Northern Taste	Northern Dancer
Dam Running Heroine (JPN) 1993	Dyna Actress (JPN); 1983	Northern Taste	Lady Victoria
Dam Running Heroine (JPN) 1993	Dyna Actress (JPN); 1983	Model Sport	Model Pool
Dam Running Heroine (JPN) 1993	Dyna Actress (JPN); 1983	Model Sport	Magic Goddess (family: 1-x)

- Screen Hero is inbred 4 × 4 to Hail To Reason and Northern Dancer, meaning that both of these stallions appear twice in the fourth generation of his pedigree.
