= American Jockey Club Cup =

American Jockey Club Cup アメリカジョッキークラブカップ
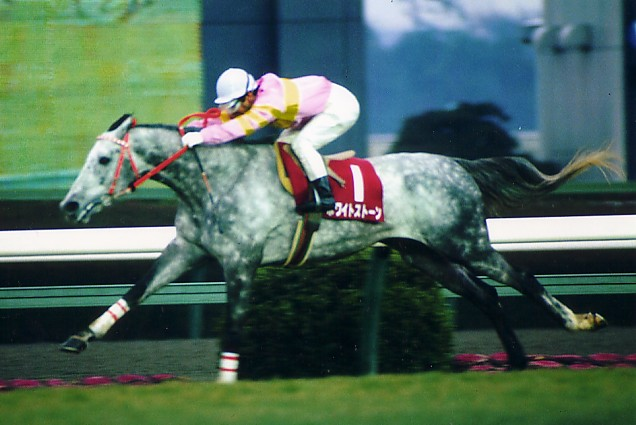
- 34th American Jockey Club Cup (White Stone)
- Class: Grade 2
- Location: Nakayama Racecourse
- Inaugurated: January 5, 1960
- Race type: Thoroughbred Flat racing

Race information
- Distance: 2200 metres
- Surface: Turf
- Track: Right-handed
- Qualification: 4-y-o +, Colts & Fillies
- Weight: Special Weight
- Purse: ¥ 134,620,000 (as of 2026): 1st: ¥ 62,000,000; 2nd: ¥ 25,000,000; 3rd: ¥ 16,000,000

The American Jockey Club Cup (アメリカジョッキークラブカップ) is a Grade 2 (GII) flat horse race in Japan.

== Background ==
The American Jockey Club Cup is a Grade II Thoroughbred flat race in Japan open to horses aged four years and older. It is held annually in late January at Nakayama Racecourse over a distance of 2,200 meters on turf (outer course). The race is run under weight-for-age conditions: 56 kg for 4-year-olds, 57 kg for 5-year-olds and up, with fillies and mares receiving a 2 kg allowance. Additional weight penalties apply based on recent graded stakes performances.

Eligibility includes JRA-trained horses, up to two certified regional (NAR) horses, and foreign-trained horses with priority entry. The first-place prize in 2026 was ¥62 million. The trophy is officially known as the American Jockey Club Prize.

== History ==
The American Jockey Club Cup was inaugurated on January 5, 1960, at Nakayama Racecourse as a 2,000-meter handicap race for horses aged five and older, created to commemorate the post–World War II friendship between Japan and the United States, following a gift of the winner’s cup from the New York Jockey Club.

In 1961, the race was restructured: it swapped scheduling dates with the Kinpai (now the Nakayama Kimpai), changed from handicap to weight-for-age conditions, and extended to 2,600 meters. Over the next two decades, the race saw multiple venue and distance changes, alternating between Nakayama and Tokyo Racecourses and ranging from 2,400 to 2,600 meters. In 1984, coinciding with the introduction of Japan’s official grading system, the race was designated Grade II and permanently settled at Nakayama over 2,200 meters, though that year’s edition was exceptionally run on dirt (1,800m) due to heavy snowfall.

The race gradually opened to international participation: foreign-bred horses were allowed from 1972, foreign-trained horses from 2006, and regional (NAR) horses from 2020. Following Japan’s elevation to “Part I” status in the International Federation of Horseracing Authorities, the race received international Grade II recognition in 2009. Over the years, the field size has gradually increased, expanding from 16 to 18 runners.

== Past winners ==
Year	Winner	Age	Length (in m)	Jockey	Trainer	Owner	Time
1960	Onward Bell	4	T2000	Takegoro Ebina	Toshio Nihonyanagi	Junzo Kashiyama	2:04.9
1961	Yashima First	4	T2600	Takayoshi Yasuda	Tokichi Ogata	Shohei Kobayashi	2:43.6
1962	Takamagahara	5	T2600	Takemi Kaga	Kizo Konishi	Taro Hirai	2:43.3
1963	Korehisa	4	T2600	Shigekatsu Moriyasu	Tokichi Ogata	Yasushi Chigira	2:42.4
1964	Suzu Top Run	5	T2600	Yoshio Nohira	Suenosuke Mori	Yoshio Komurasaki	2:46.8
1965	Asahoko	5	T2600	Takemi Kaga	Tomiyoshi Fujimoto	Eiichi Tezuka	2:42.5
1966	Haku Zuiko	5	T2600	Takayoshi Yasuda	Tokichi Ogata	Hiroshi Nishi	2:42.0
1967	Speed Symboli	4	T2500	Yuji Nohira	Tomihisa Nohira	Tomohiro Wada	2:37.3
1968	Niu Onward	4	T2500	Shigekatsu Moriyasu	Tokichi Ogata	Junzo Kashiyama	2:39.0
1969	Asaka O	4	T2500	Takemi Kaga	Hiroshi Nakamura	Genji Asaka	2:38.9
1970	Speed Symboli	7	T2500	Yuji Nohira	Tomihisa Nohira	Tomohiro Wada	2:34.9
1971	Akane Tenryu	5	T2500	Toshihide Marume	Teruo Hashimoto	Eiichi Sekino	2:36.2
1972	Mejiro Asama	6	T2400	Masahiro Ikegami	Takayoshi Yasuda	Toyokichi Kitano	2:28.4
1973	Onward Guy	5	T2400	Hayato Minoda	Suenosuke Mori	Junzo Kashiyama	2:30.1
1974	Take Hope	4	T2400	Futoshi Kojima	Yukio Inaba	Take Kondo	2:27.5
1975	Strong Eight	6	T2400	Hiroyuki Nakajima	Shinji Okuhira	Highland Ranch Ltd.	2:31.9
1976	White Fontaine	6	T2400	Tsukasa Takahashi	Katsuyuki Okubo	Kei Yoshihashi	2:28.7
1977	Green Grass	4	T2400	Tomio Yasuda	Takao Nakano	Kichishiro Hanzawa	2:26.3
1978	Kashu Chikara	5	T2400	Akemi Deguchi	Tamao Yagura	Gonzaburo Yoshida	2:28.9
1979	Sakura Shori	4	T2400	Futoshi Kojima	Hikoyuki Kubota	Sakura Commerce Co. Ltd.	2:29.0
1980	Kanemikasa	6	T2500	Seiji Ebisawa	Akimitsu Narumiya	Ikuko Hatakeyama	2:37.1
1981	Hoyo Boy	6	T2500	Kazuhiro Kato	Toshio Nihonyanagi	Yoshiharu Furukawa	2:37.5
1982	Amber Shadai	5	T2500	Kazuhiro Kato	Toshio Nihonyanagi	Zenya Yoshida	2:34.3
1983	Amber Shadai	6	T2500	Kazuhiro Kato	Toshio Nihonyanagi	Zenya Yoshida	2:35.4
1984	Shuzan King	5	D1800	Masamitsu Tamura	Yoyomatsu Kaji	Kazuo Taira	1:52.6
1985	Sakura Gaisen	5	T2200	Futoshi Kojima	Hikoyuki Kubota	Sakura Commerce Co. Ltd.	2:14.4
1986	Suda Hawk	4	T2200	Seiki Tabara	Ryoji Furuyama	Matsuo Suda	2:13.3
1987	Miho Shinzan	5	T2200	Masato Shibata	Tomojirō Tanaka	Kanji Tsutsumi	2:15.4
1988	Kashima Wing	5	T2200	Hitoshi Matoba	Yoshiji Iizuka	Yasuo Matsuura	2:13.4
1989	Running Free	6	T2200	Yasuo Sugawara	Kazuhiko Hongo	Taisuke Fujishima	2:15.6
1990	Sakura Hokuto O	4	T2200	Futoshi Kojima	Katsutaro Sakai	Sakura Commerce Co. Ltd.	2:13.8
1991	Mejiro Monterey	5	T2200	Norihiro Yokoyama	Shinji Okuhira	Mejiro Farm Ltd.	2:13.8
1992	Tosho Falcon	6	T2200	Masato Shibata	Tsutomu Nizeki	Tosho Sangyo Co. Ltd.	2:12.8
1993	White Stone	6	T2200	Masato Shibata	Kunio Takamatsu	Hiroshi Ando	2:15.0
1994	Matikanetannhauser	5	T2200	Yoshitomi Shibata	Yuji Ito	Masuo Hosokawa	2:14.1
1995	Sakura Chitose O	5	T2200	Futoshi Kojima	Katsutaro Sakai	Sakura Commerce Co. Ltd.	2:14.4
1996	Kanetsu Cross	5	T2200	Hitoshi Matoba	Masahiro Horii	Kanetsu Racehorse Co. Ltd.	2:15.0
1997	Rosen Kavalier	4	T2200	Norihiro Yokoyama	Yasuhiro Suzuki	Shadai Race Horse Ltd.	2:14.9
1998	Mejiro Bright	4	T2200	Hiroshi Kawachi	Hidekazu Asami	Mejiro Farm Ltd.	2:15.3
1999	Special Week	4	T2200	Olivier Peslier	Toshiaki Shirai	Hiroyoshi Usuda	2:16.8
2000	Matikane Kinnohosi	4	T2200	Shinji Fujita	Kazuo Fujisawa	Masuo Hosokawa	2:13.4
2001	American Boss	6	T2200	Teruo Eda	Fuyuki Tago	Abiru Real Estate Co. Ltd.	2:13.8
2002	Fusaichi Run Heart	5	T2200	Teruo Eda	Michifumi Kono	Fusao Sekiguchi	2:13.7
2003	Magnaten	7	T2200	Olivier Peslier	Kazuo Fujisawa	Takao Komai	2:12.3
2004	Dantsu Judge	5	T2200	Shinji Fujita	Kenji Yamauchi	Tetsuji Yamamoto	2:15.5
2005	Kraftwerk	5	T2200	Norihiro Yokoyama	Yoshiyuki Goto	Sunday Racing Ltd.	2:11.4
2006	Silk Famous	7	T2200	Yoshitomi Shibata	Ippo Sameshima	Silk Ltd.	2:13.2
2007	Matsurida Gogh	4	T2200	Norihiro Yokoyama	Sakae Kunieda	Fumie Takahashi	2:12.8
2008	Air Shady	7	T2200	Hiroki Goto	Masanori Ito	Lucky Field Co. Ltd.	2:13.6
2009	Never Bouchon	6	T2200	Norihiro Yokoyama	Masanori Ito	TH Co. Ltd.	2:13.9
2010	Never Bouchon	7	T2200	Norihiro Yokoyama	Masanori Ito	TH Co. Ltd.	2:12.6
2011	Tosen Jordan	5	T2200	Hiroyuki Uchida	Yasutoshi Ikee	Takaya Shimakawa	2:14.2
2012	Rulership	5	T2200	Yuichi Fukunaga	Katsuhiko Sumii	Sunday Racing Ltd.	2:17.3
2013	Danon Ballade	5	T2200	Fran Berry	Yasutoshi Ikee	Danox Co. Ltd.	2:13.1
2014	Verde Green	6	T2200	Hironobu Tanabe	Ikuo Aizawa	Mitsumasa Saito	2:14.0
2015	Courir Kaiser	6	T2200	Hironobu Tanabe	Ikuo Aizawa	Shuji Yokoyama	2:13.6
2016	Decipher	7	T2200	Yutaka Take	Futoshi Kojima	Mohammed bin Rashid Al Maktoum	2:12.0
2017	Tanta Alegria	5	T2200	Masayoshi Ebina	Sakae Kunieda	G1 Racing Co. Ltd.	2:11.9
2018	Danburite	4	T2200	Mirco Demuro	Hidetaka Otonashi	Sunday Racing Ltd.	2:13.3
2019	Sciacchetra	6	T2200	Shu Ishibashi	Katsuhiko Sumii	Kaneko Makoto Holdings Co. Ltd.	2:13.7
2020	Blast Onepiece	5	T2200	Yuga Kawada	Masahiro Otake	Silk Racing Ltd.	2:15.0
2021	Aristoteles	4	T2200	Christophe Lemaire	Hidetaka Otonashi	Hideko Kondo	2:17.9
2022	King Of Koji	6	T2200	Norihiro Yokoyama	Shogo Yasuda	Kazuhiro Masuda	2:12.7
2023	North Bridge	5	T2200	Yasunari Iwata	Takeshi Okumura	Noboru Iyama	2:13.5
2024	Chuck Nate	6	T2200	Rachel King	Noriyuki Hori	Kaneko Makoto Holdings Co. Ltd.	2:16.6
2025	Danon Decile	4	T2200	Keita Tosaki	Shogo Yasuda	Danox Co. Ltd.	2:12.1
2026	Shohei	4	T2200	Yuga Kawada	Yasuo Tomomichi	Tatsue Ishikawa	2:10.8

== See also ==
- Horse racing in Japan
- List of Japanese flat horse races

=== Netkeiba ===
- 1960 en, 1961 en, 1962 en, 1963 en, 1964 en, 1965 en, 1966 en, 1967 en, 1968 en, 1969 en, 1970 en, 1971 en, 1972 en, 1973 en, 1974 en, 1975 en, 1976 en, 1977 en, 1978 en, 1979 en, 1980 en, 1981 en, 1982 en, 1983 en, 1984 en, 1985 en, 1986 en, 1987 en, 1988 en, 1989 en, 1990 en, 1991 en, 1992 en, 1993 en, 1994 en, 1995 en, 1996 en, 1997 en, 1998 en, 1999 en, 2000 en, 2001 en, 2002 en, 2003 en, 2004 en, 2005 en, 2006 en, 2007 en, 2008 en, 2009 en, 2010 en, 2011 en, 2012 en, 2013 en, 2014 en, 2015 en, 2016 en, 2017 en, 2018 en, 2019 en, 2020 en, 2021 en, 2022 en, 2023 en, 2024 en, 2025 en, 2026 en
