= Tosen Jordan =

Japanese Thoroughbred racehorse (2006-present)

Tosen Jordan トーセンジョーダン
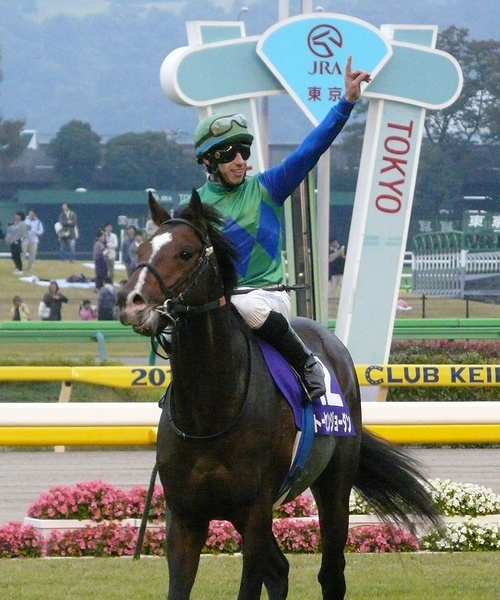
- Tosen Jordan after winning the 2011 Autumn Tennō Shō.
- Breed: Thoroughbred
- Sire: Jungle Pocket
- Grandsire: Tony Bin
- Dam: Every Whisper
- Damsire: Northern Taste
- Sex: Stallion
- Foaled: February 4, 2006 (age 20)
- Country: Japan
- Colour: Bay
- Breeder: Northern Farm
- Owner: Takaya Shimakawa
- Racing colours
- Trainer: Yatsutoshi Ikee
- Jockey: Hiroyuki Uchida; Nicola Pinna
- Record: 30: 9-4-2
- Earnings: ¥705,060,000

Major wins
- Copa Republica Argentina (2010); American Jockey Club Cup (2011); Sapporo Kinen (2011); Tennō Shō (Autumn) (2011)

Tosen Jordan (Japanese: トーセンジョーダン, Hepburn: Tōsen Jōdan; foaled 4 February 2006) is a Japanese Thoroughbred racehorse who competed from 2008 to 2014. Throughout his racing career he had 30 starts with 9 wins, including the Grade 1 2011 Tennō Shō (Autumn). Throughout his racing career, Tosen Jordan suffered from a cleft hoof that caused him to have long gaps between races. Despite this, he would win a number of Grade 2 races, including the Sapporo Kinen, American Jockey Club Cup, and the Copa Republica Argentina. He would retire from racing in 2014 and become a breeding stallion in Hidaka, Hokkaido. By 2016 he was the second most popular breeding stallion at the Breeder's Stallion Station.

== Background ==
Tosen Jordan was foaled on 4 February 2006 at Northern Farm. He was sired by Jungle Pocket who won the 2001 Tōkyō Yūshun. His dam Every Whisper was a daughter of Northern Taste who was a prolific sire in Japan. "Tosen" was his owner, Takaya Shimakawa's crown name and "Jordan" was reference to a Californian wine. However, this was also a play on basketball player Michael Jordan as per the owner's daughter, Akiko Shimakawa remarks. He would be purchased for 178,500,000 ¥ in 2007.

== Racing career ==
=== 2008: Two year old season ===
Tosen Jordan's debut race was on November 1st on the Kyoto Racecourse where he placed middle of the pack in 6th. On November 16th he would race at the Two-Year-Old Maiden race at the Fukushima Racecourse and place 1st, scoring their first career win. He would go on to win the Habotan Sho and the Hopeful Stakes that December.

=== 2009: Three year old season ===
He would run the Kyodo News Cup on February 8th, placing second behind Break Run Out. After this race it was discovered that he had a cleft hoof, leading to him being unable to race for several months while he recovered. He would return to race in the Andromeda Stakes on November 14th, placing second once again. He would race again on December 12, this time finishing in fourth.

=== 2010: Four year old season ===
Due to his poor performance, he would be demoted and take another extended break. He returned to run the Goryokaku Stakes on July 4th, but only managed to place fifth. That same month he would run the Isaribi Stakes and place first, granting him access back into open races. He then had two more consecutive victories in the Ireland Trophy and Copa Republica Argentine Cup, marking his first G2 victory. His final race of the year was the Arima Kinen where he placed fifth.

=== 2011: Five year old season ===
Undeterred from his Arima Kinen performance, Tosen Jordan would win another G2, the American Jockey Club Cup, on January 23rd. He was planned to race in his third G2 race, the Hanshin Daishoten, but due to an injury would have to pull out. He would return on June 26th for the Takarazuka Kinen, but would place 9th. Despite this, he would win his third G2 race, the Sapporo Kinen, that August. On October 30th he would participate in the G1 Tenno Sho (Autumn). During this race he was the 7th favorite to win, but managed to land his first G1 victory by half a length. His time of 1.56.1 minutes broke the course record previously held by Vodka of 1.57.2. minutes It was also a new national record for the 2000 meter distance on turf. This record would hold for 12 years until it was beaten by Equinox in 2023, with a speed of 1.55.2 minutes. Riding this victory, he would enter the Japan Cup on November 27th, placing second. His final race of the year was another attempt at the Arima Kinen, but once again placed fifth.

=== 2012: Six year old season ===
In April Tosen Jordan would run the Osaka Hai, placing third, and the Tenno Sho (Spring) placing second. He would take a long break again due to his cleft hoof, and not race again until the Tenno Sho (Autumn) in October, but suffered a crushing defeat placing 13th. In November he would attempt to run the Japan Cup but would only manage to place 6th.

=== 2013: Seven year old season ===
Tosen Jordan wouldn't race again until August 18th, placing 13th in the Sapporo Kinen. He would have a solid showing at the Japan Cup that November, placing 3rd with Gentildonna and Denim and Ruby, all making the same time of 2.26.1 minutes. The decision for victory was by a nose for Gentildonna and a neck for Denim and Ruby. Despite this solid showing, he would place 14th in the Arima Kinen that year.

=== 2014: Eight year old season ===
After this defeat, Tosen Jordan returned on June 7th to run the Naruo Kinen, but placed 8th near the back of the pack. He then was entered into the Takarazuka Kinen but one again lost placing 10th. He would try once more to race in the Tenno Sho (Autumn) but suffered a crushing defeat placing 17th. His final race was the Japan Cup on November 30th, where he placed 14th. After these consecutive losses, Tosen Jordan would be removed from race registrations in December, after which he became a breeding stallion.

== Racing statistics ==
The following racing form is based on information available from JBIS-Search and netkeiba.com.

Date	Race	Class	Distance	Racecourse	Track	Finish	Entry	Time	Jockey	Winner (2nd Place)
2008 – two-year-old season
Nov 1	Two Year Old Newcomer	Debut	2000m	Kyoto	Turf	6th	14	2:04.6	Y.Take	Familism
Nov 16	Two Year Old Maiden	Maiden	2000m	Fukushima	Turf	1st	16	2:02.7	Y.Kitamura	(Chihira)
Dec 6	Haboten Sho	Pre-OP	2000m	Nakayama	Turf	1st	9	2:00.5	O.Peslier	(Sacred Valley)
Dec 28	Hopeful Stakes	OP	2000m	Nakayama	Turf	1st	13	2:00.5	O.Peslier	(Arashio Yobu Otoko)
2009 – three-year-old season
Feb 8	Kyodo Tsushin Hai	G3	1800m	Tokyo	Turf	2nd	15	1:47.6	M.Matsuoka	Break Run Out
Nov 14	Andromeda Stakes	OP	2000m	Kyoto	Turf	2nd	17	2:00.7	C.Soumillon	Namura Crescent
Dec 12	Chunichi Shimbun Hai	G3	2000m	Chukyo	Turf	4th	15	1:58.0	C.Soumillon	Earnestly
2010 – four-year-old season
Jul 4	Goryukaku Stakes	Pre-OP	2000m	Hakodate	Turf	5th	10	2:02.2	Y.Fujioka	Meiner Kirov
Jul 31	Isaribi Stakes	Pre-OP	1800m	Hakodate	Turf	1st	14	1:49.4	D.Whyte	(Mikki Pumpkin)
Oct 16	Ireland Trophy	OP	2000m	Tokyo	Turf	1st	14	1:59.2	H.Uchida	(To the Glory)
Nov 7	Copa Republica Argentina	G2	2500m	Tokyo	Turf	1st	18	2:30.0	K.Miura	(Jamil)
Dec 26	Arima Kinen	G1	2500m	Nakayama	Turf	5th	15	2:32.9	K.Miura	Victoire Pisa
2011 – five-year-old season
Jan 23	American Jockey Club Cup	G2	2200m	Nakayama	Turf	1st	11	2:14.2	H.Uchida	(Miyabi Ranveli)
Mar 20	Hanshin Daishoten	G2	3000m	Hanshin	Turf	x	x	x	H.Uchida	Namura Crescent
Jun 26	Takarazuka Kinen	G1	2200m	Hanshin	Turf	9th	16	2:11.2	N.Pinna	Earnestly
Aug 21	Sapporo Kinen	G2	2000m	Sapporo	Turf	1st	13	2:00.4	Y.Fukunaga	(Axion)
Oct 30	Tenno Sho (Autumn)	G1	2000m	Tokyo	Turf	1st	18	1:56.1	N.Pinna	(Dark Shadow)
Nov 27	Japan Cup	G1	2400m	Tokyo	Turf	2nd	16	2:24.2	C.Williams	Buena Vista
Dec 25	Arima Kinen	G1	2500m	Nakayama	Turf	5th	13	2:36.3	C.Williams	Orfevre
2012 – six-year-old season
Apr 1	Sankei Osaka Hai	G2	2000m	Hanshin	Turf	3rd	12	2:05.8	Y.Iwata	Shonan Mighty
Apr 29	Tenno Sho (Spring)	G1	3200m	Kyoto	Turf	2nd	18	3:14.5	Y.Iwata	Beat Black
Oct 28	Tenno Sho (Autumn)	G1	2000m	Tokyo	Turf	13th	18	1:58.7	C.Soumillon	Eishin Flash
Nov 25	Japan Cup	G1	2400m	Tokyo	Turf	6th	17	2:23.9	C.Soumillon	Gentildonna
2013 – seven-year-old season
Aug 18	Sapporo Kinen	G2	2000m	Sapporo	Turf	13th	16	2:11.7	K.Tosaki	Tokei Halo
Oct 27	Tenno Sho (Autumn)	G1	2000m	Tokyo	Turf	11th	17	1:59.8	I.Mendizabal	Just A Way
Nov 24	Japan Cup	G1	2400m	Tokyo	Turf	3rd	17	2:26.1	W.Buick	Gentildonna
Dec 22	Arima Kinen	G1	2500m	Nakayama	Turf	14th	16	2:35.8	H.Uchida	Orfevre
2014 – eight-year-old season
Jun 7	Naruo Kinen	G3	2000m	Hanshin	Turf	10th	12	1:59.6	H.Uchida	Air Saumur
Jun 29	Takarazuka Kinen	G1	2200m	Hanshin	Turf	10th	12	2:15.3	H.Uchida	Gold Ship
Nov 2	Tenno Sho (Autumn)	G1	2000m	Tokyo	Turf	17th	18	2:00.7	P.Boudot	Spielberg
Nov 30	Japan Cup	G1	2400m	Tokyo	Turf	14th	18	2:26.0	P.Boudot	Epiphaneia

== Stud career ==
After his final race, Tosen Jordan would be moved to the Hidaka Breeders Station in Hokkaido. He has produced 325 offspring with a total of 33 JRA victories. His most notable progeny are Cils Blancs who placed second in the G2 Stayers Stakes in 2024, Azuma Heritage who placed second in the G3 Kokura Nisai Stakes in 2018, and Futaiten Rock who placed third the G3 Sirius Stakes in 2024.

== In popular culture ==
An anthropomorphized version of Tosen Jordan appears as a character in the Japanese multimedia franchise Umamusume: Pretty Derby, voiced by Eri Suzuki. She is depicted as an airheaded, stylish gyaru who pretends to be less intelligent than she lets on in order to avoid difficult situations and enjoys following the latest trends and fashion. She is close friends with other gyarus such as Gold City, and has a particular obsession with her delicate nails and nail polish, wishing to someday start her own brand. She is one of Gold Ship's favorite targets for her pranks and she takes particular enjoyment in tormenting Jordan, reflecting their real-life, post-retirement antagonistic relationship; despite this, they have moments of amicable rivalry with each other.

== Pedigree ==
Pedigree of Tosen Jordan (JPN), 2006
Sire Jungle Pocket 1998	Tony Bin; 1983	Kampala; 1976	Kalamoun; 1970
Sire Jungle Pocket 1998	Tony Bin; 1983	Kampala; 1976	State Pension; 1967
Sire Jungle Pocket 1998	Tony Bin; 1983	Severn Bridge; 1965	Hornbeam; 1953
Sire Jungle Pocket 1998	Tony Bin; 1983	Severn Bridge; 1965	Priddy Fair; 1956
Sire Jungle Pocket 1998	Dance Charmer; 1990	Nureyev; 1977	Northern Dancer; 1961
Sire Jungle Pocket 1998	Dance Charmer; 1990	Nureyev; 1977	Special; 1969
Sire Jungle Pocket 1998	Dance Charmer; 1990	Skillful Joy; 1979	Nodouble; 1965
Sire Jungle Pocket 1998	Dance Charmer; 1990	Skillful Joy; 1979	Skillful Miss; 1974
Dam Every Whisper 1997 F.no: 9	Northern Taste; 1971	Northern Dancer; 1961	Nearctic; 1954
Dam Every Whisper 1997 F.no: 9	Northern Taste; 1971	Northern Dancer; 1961	Natalma; 1957
Dam Every Whisper 1997 F.no: 9	Northern Taste; 1971	Lady Victoria; 1962	Victoria Park; 1957
Dam Every Whisper 1997 F.no: 9	Northern Taste; 1971	Lady Victoria; 1962	Lady Angela; 1944
Dam Every Whisper 1997 F.no: 9	Crafty Wife; 1985	Crafty Prospector; 1979	Mr. Prospector; 1970
Dam Every Whisper 1997 F.no: 9	Crafty Wife; 1985	Crafty Prospector; 1979	Real Crafty Lady; 1975
Dam Every Whisper 1997 F.no: 9	Crafty Wife; 1985	Wife Mistress; 1979	Secretariat; 1970
Dam Every Whisper 1997 F.no: 9	Crafty Wife; 1985	Wife Mistress; 1979	Political Payoff; 1969

- Tosen Jordan is an inbred by 4 x 3 to Northern Dancer, 5 x 4 to Lady Angela (Nearctic's dam) and 5 x 5 to Hyperion (Lady Angela's and Hornbeam's sire).
