= Admire Jupiter =

Japanese-bred Thoroughbred racehorse

Admire Jupiter アドマイヤジュピタ
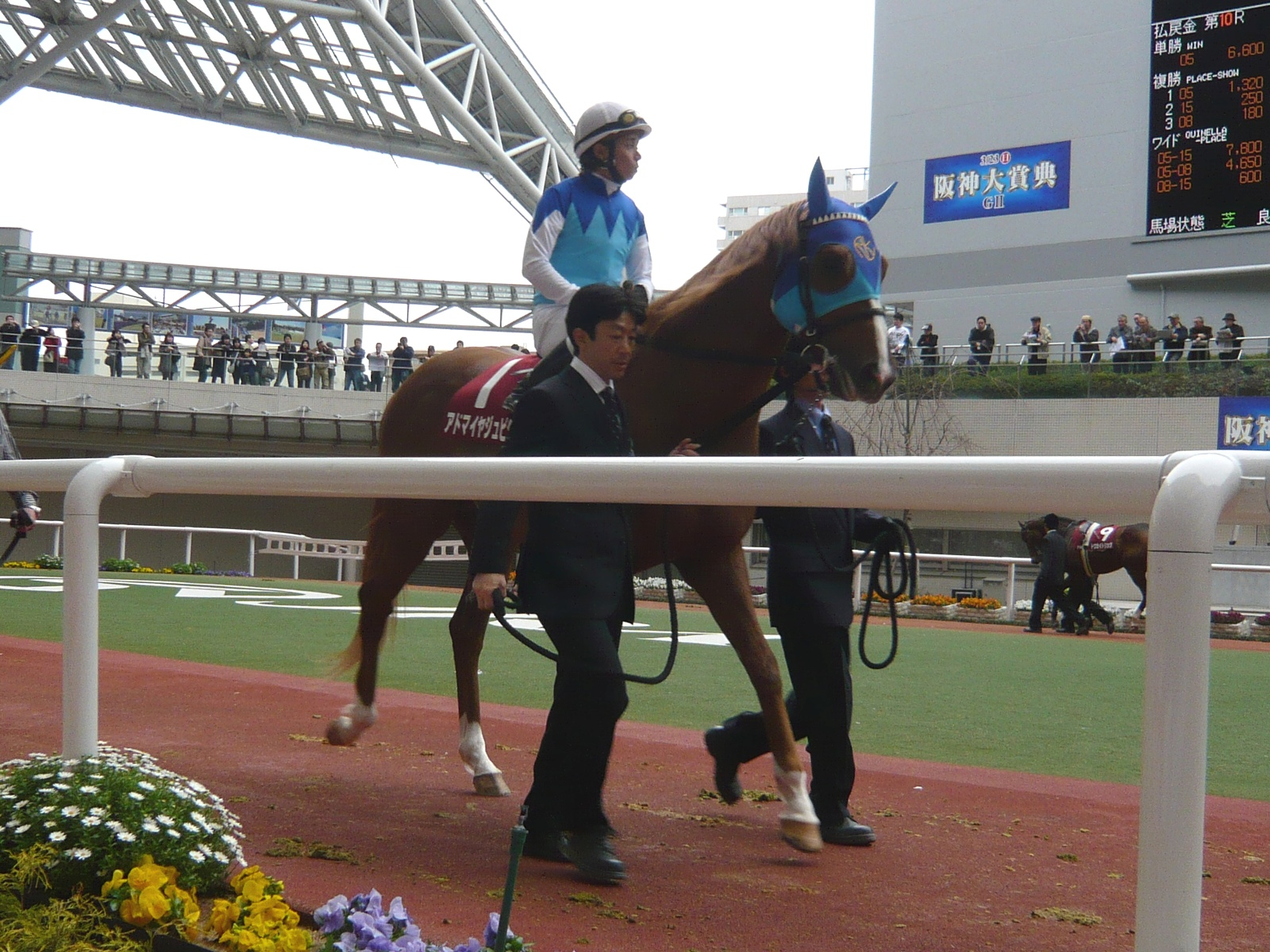
- Admire Jupiter at the 2008 Hanshin Daishoten paddock
- Sire: French Deputy
- Grandsire: Deputy Minister
- Dam: J's Jewelry
- Damsire: Real Shadai
- Sex: Stallion
- Foaled: 1 March 2003
- Died: 28 November 2023 (aged 20)
- Country: Japan
- Colour: Chestnut
- Breeder: Northern Farm
- Owner: Riichi Kondo
- Racing colours
- Trainer: Yasuo Tomomichi
- Jockey: Yasunari Iwata
- Record: 14: 7–2–2
- Earnings: 326,579,000 JPY

Major wins
- Copa Republica Argentina (2007); Hanshin Daishoten (2008); Tenno Sho (Spring) (2008)
- Last updated on 1 August 2026

Admire Jupiter (Japanese: アドマイヤジュピタ, Hepburn: Adomaiya Jupita; 1 March 2003 - 28 November 2023) was a Japanese racehorse and breeding stallion who won the 2008 Tenno Sho (Spring). He also won the 2007 Copa Republica Argentina and the 2008 Hanshin Daishoten.

== Background ==
Admire Jupiter was the third foal of J's Jewelry, who won two races from nine starts in her career. She herself was sired by Real Shadai, the winner of Grand Prix de Deauville and placed second in the Prix du Jockey Club in 1982. He was sired by French Deputy, an american-bred horse who won four races in six starts with the biggest win at the 1995 Jerome Handicap.

He was sold to Riichi Kondo at the price of 43,050,000 JPY as a foal number 21. His name was a combination of Kondo stable name - Admire and the planet Jupiter itself.

== Racing career ==
=== 2005: two-year-old season ===
In November, he started his career with a poor performance when he only finished in eighth place on a dirt track at the Kyoto Racecourse. One month later, he performed better in his first turf race as he moved up from tenth position to finish in third on the line. In his third race, Yasunari Iwata, the jockey who rode him, raced while keeping an eye on the leading group, caught them in his sights at the final turn, and surged ahead in the straight to claim his first victory.

=== 2006: three-year-old season ===
He returned in January with a run at the Wakagoma Stakes. He stayed mostly at the front group before getting caught and passed by Fusaichi Junk in the final straight to finish in second place. Admire Jupiter ran again in February at the Sumire Stakes, in which he finished third behind Niagara and Meiner Alabanza. In his next campaign at the Yukiyanagi Sho, where Iwata was back in the saddle, the horse tracked the leaders' group from a good position before switching to the outside track on the final straight to snatch his second career win. However, he suffered an injury on his right hind hock and went into surgery in hopes of making it out before the Kikuka Sho, which eventually had to be abandoned because the horse could not handle intensive training. He was rested for the rest of the season.

=== 2007: four-year-old season ===
Unable to secure enough wins and participate in the classics, he was demoted back to allowance races, where he comfortably won by one length ahead of Full Victory in a 1800 metres race at the Niigata Racecourse. At the Mimasaka Tokubetsu, he finished in second place by a neck margin behind B of the Bang, who led throughout the whole race. In October, Iwata returned as his jockey and propelled him to his needed fourth win that promoted him back into the open class as he sneaked out in second position behind King of Winner before took the lead and won the Narutaki Tokubetsu by five lengths over Meiner Anthem who finished second. This win allowed him to join his first graded race ever, the Copa Republica Argentina which was a 2500 metres G2 race at the Tokyo Racecourse. After a good start, he patiently tracked in a good position in third place as lightly handicapped horses took the lead at an average pace. As they entered the final straight, the two horses that had been leading slowed down with 400 metres to go, and Admire Jupiter was naturally pushed to the front. At this point, Issei Murata, who was the jockey today, gave the go signal without hesitation, and he instantly pulled away from the rest of the field. He lost some form slightly but regained it in time as he drew alongside the favourite, Tokai Trick, which was making a move on the inside, and with one powerful burst of speed, he crossed the finish line in victory and gained his first graded race win ever. At the end of the season, he had gained enough prize money and accumulated enough votes to race in the Arima Kinen. He eventually withdrew from the race as they rested him and prepared him for the next year Tenno Sho (Spring).

=== 2008: five-year-old season ===
At the beginning of the season, he was registered for the overseas race in Dubai and also the Nikkei Shinshun Hai, in which the trainer picked the latter. In this race, Admire Jupiter who was dubbed as the first favourite failed to impress as he could not extend his lead in the straight and finished in fourth place. His next campaign would be the Hanshin Daishoten in March, a 3000 metres G2 race. When the race began, he tracked in second place throughout the race, took the lead at the start of the straight, and won by two-and-a-half lengths over the fifth favourite, Eye Popper. His main jockey, Iwata, said after the race, "He was a bit restless in the starting gate today, but Dream Flight took the lead, so he settled down well. I was confident he wouldn't lose if it came down to a sprint finish. He was a bit heavy in the last race, but he was in good condition today." His second graded stakes win would be a catalyst for the owner to register him for his first-ever G1 race, the Spring Tenno Sho, the longest-distance G1 race in Japan, topping at 3200 metres in Kyoto Racecourse. Despite having a poor release and starting from the outermost gate, Iwata and Admire Jupiter regained the concentration as the race went along. They made enough ground, moved to the lead pack, contested at the final straight with Meisho Samson and Asakusa Kings, in which he snatched the title by a neck ahead of the former and two-and-a-half lengths ahead of the latter. This was the first G1 win for the trainer, Yasuo Tomomichi, who was overjoyed on the outcome alongside the owner, Riichi Kondo.

Despite being the sixth-most-voted horse into the Takarazuka Kinen, Tomomichi decided to rest him for the autumn campaign. In summer, it was determined that Admire Jupiter would join the Prix de l'Arc de Triomphe but the plan soon abandoned as he developed a stone bruise in his right foreleg. Focusing back on the domestic campaign, the horse would join the Kyoto Daishoten as the first race after the summer break. He suffered a great defeat in this race as he finished in ninth out of ten participating horse for the day. A week later, he was diagnosed with a superficial digital flexor tendonitis, a severe injury that effectively forced his retirement from racing. His racehorse registration was terminated the next day.

== Racing form ==
Admire Jupiter won seven races and scored four podium finishes out of 14 starts. This data is available based on JBIS and netkeiba.

Date	Racecourse	Race	Grade	Distance (Condition)	Entry	HN	Odds (Favored)	Finish	Time	Margins	Jockey	Winner (Runner-up)
2005 – two-year-old season
Nov 13	Kyoto	2yo Newcomer		1,400 m (Good)	15	4	4.6 (2)	8th	1:27.6	2.0	Yutaka Take	Seiun Wakitatsu
Dec 4	Hanshin	2yo Maiden		1,600 m (Firm)	16	6	9.7 (5)	3rd	1:37.9	0.2	Yasunari Iwata	Lotus
Dec 25	Hanshin	2yo Maiden		2,000 m (Firm)	16	5	6.6 (3)	1st	2:03.3	–0.7	Yasunari Iwata	(Tagano Boarding)
2006 – three-year-old season
Jan 21	Kyoto	Wakagoma Stakes	OP	2,000 m (Firm)	6	4	8.1 (3)	2nd	2:03.3	0.3	Hirofumi Shii	Fusaichi Junk
Feb 26	Hanshin	Sumire Stakes	OP	2,200 m (Heavy)	9	9	1.8 (1)	3rd	2:19.1	0.1	Katsumi Ando	Niagara
Mar 11	Hanshin	Yukiyanagi Sho (ALW)	1W	2,200 m (Firm)	11	11	2.0 (1)	1st	2:16.0	–0.3	Yasunari Iwata	(Deep Wing)
2007 – four-year-old season
Jul 29	Niigata	3yo+ Allowance	1W	1,800 m (Firm)	17	3	6.4 (2)	1st	1:46.8	–0.2	Hayato Yoshida	(Full Victory)
Sep 17	Hanshin	Mimasaka Tokubetsu (ALW)	2W	2,000 m (Firm)	15	7	2.2 (1)	2nd	2:00.8	0.0	Yasunari Iwata	B of the Bang
Oct 13	Kyoto	Narutaki Tokubetsu (ALW)	2W	2,200 m (Firm)	9	1	1.2 (1)	1st	2:15.0	–0.8	Yasunari Iwata	(Meiner Anthem)
Nov 4	Tokyo	Copa Republica Argentina	2	2,500 m (Firm)	18	9	5.1 (2)	1st	2:30.9	–0.1	Issei Murata	(Tokai Trick)
2008 – five-year-old season
Jan 20	Kyoto	Nikkei Shinshun Hai	2	2,400 m (Firm)	16	1	2.6 (1)	4th	2:27.8	0.4	Yasunari Iwata	Admire Monarch
Mar 23	Hanshin	Hanshin Daishoten	2	3,000 m (Firm)	13	1	7.5 (4)	1st	3:08.7	–0.4	Yasunari Iwata	(Eye Popper)
May 4	Kyoto	Tenno Sho (Spring)	1	3,200 m (Firm)	14	14	5.8 (3)	1st	3:15.1	0.0	Yasunari Iwata	(Meisho Samson)
Oct 12	Kyoto	Kyoto Daishoten	1	2,400 m (Firm)	10	6	3.6 (2)	9th	2:28.0	1.1	Yasunari Iwata	Toho Alan

Legend:
Turf Dirt

== Stud career and death ==
He moved into stud duty at the Shadai Stallion Station with a 500,000 JPY fee. He only stood as a stud for one year, as he only produced 19 foals out of 94 mares that he bred that year that earned 54,744,500 JPY with AEI of 0.26. In 2010, he was gelded and transferred to Northern Horse Park at Tomakomai, Hokkaido to become a riding horse.

Two years later, he, alongside his rider, Misato Yoneda, won a dressage competition at the 26th Hokkaido Fresh Green Equestrian Competition, which was hosted by the Northern Horse Park. He snatched another second-place finish in another equestrian tournament in 2018.

He spent the rest of his life at the Northern Horse Park until his death on 28 November 2023 due to old age. He was 20.

== Pedigree ==
Pedigree of Admire Jupiter (JPN), chestnut stallion, 2003
Sire French Deputy (USA) 1992	Deputy Minister (CAN); 1979	Vice Regent	Northern Dancer
Sire French Deputy (USA) 1992	Deputy Minister (CAN); 1979	Vice Regent	Victoria Regina
Sire French Deputy (USA) 1992	Deputy Minister (CAN); 1979	Mint Copy	Bunty's Flight
Sire French Deputy (USA) 1992	Deputy Minister (CAN); 1979	Mint Copy	Shakney
Sire French Deputy (USA) 1992	Mitterand (USA); 1981	Hold Your Peace	Speak John
Sire French Deputy (USA) 1992	Mitterand (USA); 1981	Hold Your Peace	Blue Moon
Sire French Deputy (USA) 1992	Mitterand (USA); 1981	Laredo Lass	Bold Ruler
Sire French Deputy (USA) 1992	Mitterand (USA); 1981	Laredo Lass	Fortunate Isle
Dam J's Jewelry (JPN) 1995	Real Shadai (USA); 1979	Roberto	Hail to Reason
Dam J's Jewelry (JPN) 1995	Real Shadai (USA); 1979	Roberto	Bramalea
Dam J's Jewelry (JPN) 1995	Real Shadai (USA); 1979	Desert Vixen	In Reality
Dam J's Jewelry (JPN) 1995	Real Shadai (USA); 1979	Desert Vixen	Desert Trial
Dam J's Jewelry (JPN) 1995	Assertion (GB); 1987	Assert	Be My Guest
Dam J's Jewelry (JPN) 1995	Assertion (GB); 1987	Assert	Irish Bird
Dam J's Jewelry (JPN) 1995	Assertion (GB); 1987	Yes Please	Mount Hagen
Dam J's Jewelry (JPN) 1995	Assertion (GB); 1987	Yes Please	Thankfull (Family: 13-a)

- Admire Jupiter was an inbred by 4 x 5 to Northern Dancer (Be My Guest's sire).
