= Speed Symboli =

Japanese-bred Thoroughbred racehorse

Speed Symboli スピードシンボリ
- Breed: Thoroughbred
- Sire: Royal Challenger
- Grandsire: Royal Charger
- Dam: Sweet Inn
- Damsire: Rising Light
- Sex: Stallion
- Foaled: May 5, 1963
- Died: May 31, 1989 (aged 26)
- Country: Japan (Niikappu, Hokkaido)
- Colour: Dark bay
- Breeder: Symboli Bokujo
- Owner: Tomohiro Wada
- Racing colours
- Trainer: Tomohisa Nohira, Shozo Nohira
- Jockey: Yuji Nohira
- Record: 43: 17-5-5
- Earnings: ¥163,207,050

Major wins
- Keisei Hai (1966); Tenno Sho (Spring) (1967); Arima Kinen (1969, 1970); Takarazuka Kinen (1970); American Jockey Club Cup (1967, 1970); Meguro Kinen (Spring) (1967, 1969); Japan Keizai Sho (1967); Argentinian Jockey Club Cup (1968); Diamond Stakes (1969)

Awards
- Keishu Horse of the Year Award (1967, 1970); JRA Award for Best Older Male Horse (1967, 1970)

Honours
- Japan Racing Association Hall of Fame (1990)

Speed Symboli (Japanese: スピードシンボリ, Hepburn: Supīdo Shinbori; May 5, 1963 - May 31, 1989) was a Japanese racehorse and stud horse. In the late 1960s, he won the Tenno Sho (Spring), the Takarazuka Kinen, and the Arima Kinen (twice), and in 1967 and 1970 was awarded both the Keishu Horse of the Year prize and the JRA Award for Best Older Male Horse. He was the first Japanese horse to contest the Prix de l'Arc de Triomphe, and was inducted into the JRA Hall of Fame in 1990.

== Summary ==
Speed Symboli was born on May 3, 1963 at Symboli Bokujo. After his maiden race in 1965, he went on to have a long competitive career, during which he became the oldest horse (at the time) to win one of the Eight Big Races, winning the Arima Kinen at eight years old. In the later years of his career, he was nicknamed the "Old Hero" (Japanese: 老雄). His main jockey throughout his career was Yuji Nohira.

The horse also went abroad for a long period of time—a rarity at the time—traveling across Europe to contest famous races such as the King George VI and Queen Elizabeth Stakes in the United Kingdom and the Prix de l'Arc de Triomphe in France, during the latter of which he became the first Japanese horse ever to take part. For these reasons, he was also called the era's pioneer.

Ultimately, Speed Symboli contested 43 races over the course of his career (39 in Japan and 4 abroad) and win 17 of them, earning over 160 million yen in winnings. His five consecutive attempts at the year-end grand prix race Arima Kinen were notable; he won his fourth and fifth attempts in 1969 and 1970, becoming the first horse to win consecutive Arima Kinen races.

He became a stud horse after retiring, and while he only fathered a single graded race winner in Pure Symboli, his foal Sweet Luna eventually gave birth to seven-crown winner and the first undefeated Triple Crown winner in Symboli Rudolf. He died of old age at 26 on May 31, 1989.

== Racing form ==
Speed Symboli won 17 races, finished second five times, and third five times from 43 starts. This data is based on JBIS and netkeiba.

Date	Track	Race	Distance (Condition)	Entry	HN	Odds (Favored)	Finish	Time	Jockey	Winner (Runner-up)
1965 – three-year-old season
Oct 3	Nakayama	3yo Newcomer	1,200 m (Firm)	8	1	4.1 (2)	4th	1:15.7	Yuji Nohira	Shogun
Oct 17	Nakayama	3yo Maiden	1,200 m (Firm)	11	7	12.7 (4)	4th	1:15.2	Akira Tsuda	Miss Hayashiya
Nov 21	Tokyo	3yo Maiden	1,200 m (Good)	9	5	2.4 (1)	1st	1:14.1	Akira Tsuda	(Harbor Taro)
Dec 12	Nakayama	Under ¥500,000	1,200 m (Soft)	14	3	5.3 (1)	1st	1:15.2	Yuji Nohira	(Dorihmu Hohsu)
Dec 25	Nakayama	3yo Special	1,600 m (Soft)	18	9	8.1 (2)	1st	1:39.8	Yuji Nohira	(Onward Hill)
1966 – four-year-old season
Feb 27	Tokyo	Yayoi Sho	1,600 m (Muddy)	14	11	32.7 (7)	6th	1:40.4	Akira Tsuda	Tama Shuho
Mar 20	Nakayama	Keisei Hai	1,600 m (Good)	10	3	5.5 (1)	1st	1:40.2	Akira Tsuda	(Onward Hill)
Apr 17	Nakayama	Satsuki Sho	2,000 m (Good)	24	10	18.0 (5)	21st	2:10.9	Akira Tsuda	Nihon Pillow Ace
May 8	Tokyo	NHK Hai	2,000 m (Good)	19	4	78.8 (11)	13th	2:07.2	Yuji Nohira	Nasuno Kotobuki
May 29	Tokyo	Tokyo Yushun	2,400 m (Firm)	28	21	369.6 (27)	8th	2:32.6	Akira Tsuda	Teito O
Jun 19	Tokyo	Nihon Tanpa Sho	1,800 m (Firm)	11	2	21.0 (7)	6th	1:53.0	Akira Tsuda	Hiro Isami
Sep 18	Tokyo	Keio Hai Autumn Handicap	1,800 m (Heavy)	8	5	8.2 (3)	2nd	1:53.4	Yuji Nohira	Hama Tesso
Oct 9	Tokyo	St. Lite Kinen	2,400 m (Firm)	14	6	12.9 (7)	3rd	2:29.2	Yuji Nohira	Hiro Isami
Nov 13	Kyoto	Kikuka Sho	3,000 m (Good)	19	8	33.5 (14)	2nd	3:08.5	Yuji Nohira	Nasuno Kotobuki
Dec 25	Nakayama	Arima Kinen	2,500 m (Firm)	14	6	21.5 (6)	3rd	2:37.1	Yuji Nohira	Korehide
1967 – five-year-old season
Jan 22	Nakayama	American Jockey Club Cup	2,500 m (Firm)	11	10	6.1 (2)	1st	2:37.3	Yuji Nohira	(Buisson)
Mar 12	Tokyo	Meguro Kinen	2,500 m (Good)	13	6	4.0 (1)	1st	2:37.4	Yuji Nohira	(Buisson)
Apr 29	Kyoto	Tenno Sho (Spring)	3,200 m (Good)	13	10	2.3 (1)	1st	3:24.2	Yuji Nohira	(Kabuto Ciro)
Jun 25	Nakayama	Nihon Keizai Sho	2,500 m (Firm)	5	3	1.9 (1)	1st	2:38.1	Yuji Nohira	(Suzuhikari Top)
Nov 11	Laurel Park	Washington DC International	1 1/2 miles (Firm)	9	9	–	5th	–	Yuji Nohira	Fort Marcy
Dec 24	Nakayama	Arima Kinen	2,500 m (Firm)	15	5	2.1 (1)	4th	2:40.8	Yuji Nohira	Kabuto Ciro
1968 – six-year-old season
Jan 21	Nakayama	American Jockey Club Cup	2,500 m (Firm)	8	4	4.4 (1)	5th	2:39.9	Yuji Nohira	New Onward
Mar 31	Nakayama	Diamond Stakes	3,200 m (Soft)	12	1	5.5 (1)	6th	3:27.9	Yuji Nohira	Ono Den O
Apr 21	Nakayama	Nakayama Kinen	1,800 m (Firm)	14	1	5.7 (2)	8th	1:53.1	Yuji Nohira	Shesky
Sep 28	Tokyo	4yo+ Open	1,800 m (Good)	8	8	4.4 (2)	1st	1:49.7	Yuji Nohira	(Kuri Ayame)
Oct 13	Tokyo	Argentinian Jockey Club Cup	3,200 m (Soft)	6	3	2.2 (1)	1st	3:23.6	Yuji Nohira	(Suzu Homareboshi)
Nov 30	Tokyo	4yo+ Open	2,000 m (Firm)	7	5	1.6 (1)	1st	2:03.6	Yuji Nohira	(Shigemitsu)
Dec 22	Nakayama	Arima Kinen	2,500 m (Heavy)	11	2	4.1 (2)	3rd	2:46.6	Yuji Nohira	Ryuzuki
1969 – seven-year-old season
Jan 19	Nakayama	American Jockey Club Cup	2,500 m (Firm)	9	6	9.4 (5)	3rd	2:39.0	Yuji Nohira	Asaka O
Mar 9	Tokyo	Meguro Kinen	2,300 m (Muddy)	10	3	5.4 (2)	1st	R2:23.5	Yuji Nohira	(Die Parade)
Mar 30	Nakayama	Diamond Stakes	3,200 m (Heavy)	5	1	2.7 (1)	1st	3:36.4	Yuji Nohira	(Hishi Yakushin)
May 11	Tokyo	Argentinian Jockey Club Cup	2,600 m (Soft)	12	9	1.6 (1)	2nd	2:43.7	Yuji Nohira	Mejiro Taiyo
Jul 26	Ascot	KGVI & QE Stakes	12 furlongs (Firm)	9	–	–	5th	–	Yuji Nohira	Park Top
Aug 31	Deauville	Grand Prix de Deauville	2,600 m (Firm)	11	–	–	10th	–	Yuji Nohira	Djakao
Oct 5	Longchamp	Prix de l'Arc de Triomphe	2,400 m (Firm)	24	19	–	11th	–	Yuji Nohira	Levmoss
Dec 21	Nakayama	Arima Kinen	2,500 m (Firm)	15	9	14.5 (7)	1st	2:35.1	Yuji Nohira	(Akane Tenryu)
1970 – eight-year-old season
Jan 18	Nakayama	American Jockey Club Cup	2,500 m (Firm)	11	10	5.4 (2)	1st	R2:34.9	Yuji Nohira	(Akane Tenryu)
May 5	Tokyo	Argentinian Jockey Club Cup	2,500 m (Firm)	8	5	1.8 (1)	2nd	2:34.8	Yuji Nohira	Matsu Sedan
May 31	Hanshin	Takarazuka Kinen	2,200 m (Firm)	7	3	1.6 (1)	1st	R2:13.3	Yuji Nohira	(Ho-un)
Jun 21	Nakayama	Nihon Keizai Sho	2,500 m (Heavy)	8	2	2.9 (1)	3rd	2:42.0	Yuji Nohira	Akane Tenryu
Sep 6	Tokyo	Mainichi Okan	2,000 m (Firm)	6	6	2.6 (1)	2nd	2:03.8	Yuji Nohira	Kurishiba
Oct 18	Kyoto	Hollywood Turf Club Sho	2,400 m (Soft)	15	2	1.7 (1)	7th	2:39.7	Yuji Nohira	New Kiminonawa
Dec 20	Nakayama	Arima Kinen	2,500 m (Firm)	11	5	8.4 (3)	1st	2:35.7	Yuji Nohira	(Akane Tenryu)

Legend:
Turf Dirt

- R indicated that it was a record time finish
- Bold races indicated that it was a part of the eight major races (八大競走)

== Stud record ==
The data below is based on JBIS Stallion Reports.

=== Notable progeny ===
Year	Progeny	Sex	Major wins
1972	Chateau de Symboli	Colt	Fuchu Sansai Stakes
1976	Pure Symboli	Colt	Stayers Stakes (2x), Diamond Stakes

== In popular culture ==
An anthropomorphic version of Speed Symboli appears in Umamusume: Pretty Derby and is voiced by Miyuki Sawashiro.

== Pedigree ==
Pedigree of Speed Symboli
Sire Royal Challenger ch. 1951	Royal Charger ch. 1942	Nearco	Pharos
Sire Royal Challenger ch. 1951	Royal Charger ch. 1942	Nearco	Nogara
Sire Royal Challenger ch. 1951	Royal Charger ch. 1942	Sun Princess	Solario
Sire Royal Challenger ch. 1951	Royal Charger ch. 1942	Sun Princess	Mumtaz Begum
Sire Royal Challenger ch. 1951	Skerweather b. 1936	Singapore	Gainsborough
Sire Royal Challenger ch. 1951	Skerweather b. 1936	Singapore	Tetrabbazia
Sire Royal Challenger ch. 1951	Skerweather b. 1936	Nash Light	Galloper Light
Sire Royal Challenger ch. 1951	Skerweather b. 1936	Nash Light	Polite
Dam Sweet Inn b.1958	Rising Light b. 1942	Hyperion	Gainsborough
Dam Sweet Inn b.1958	Rising Light b. 1942	Hyperion	Selene
Dam Sweet Inn b.1958	Rising Light b. 1942	Bread Card	Manna
Dam Sweet Inn b.1958	Rising Light b. 1942	Bread Card	Book Dept
Dam Sweet Inn b.1958	Feenagh dk. b. 1949	Orthodox	Hyperion
Dam Sweet Inn b.1958	Feenagh dk. b. 1949	Orthodox	Queen Christina
Dam Sweet Inn b.1958	Feenagh dk. b. 1949	Sempronia	Colombo
Dam Sweet Inn b.1958	Feenagh dk. b. 1949	Sempronia	Glenabatrick
