= Takeshi Okumura (horse racing) =

Japanese businessman and racehorse owner

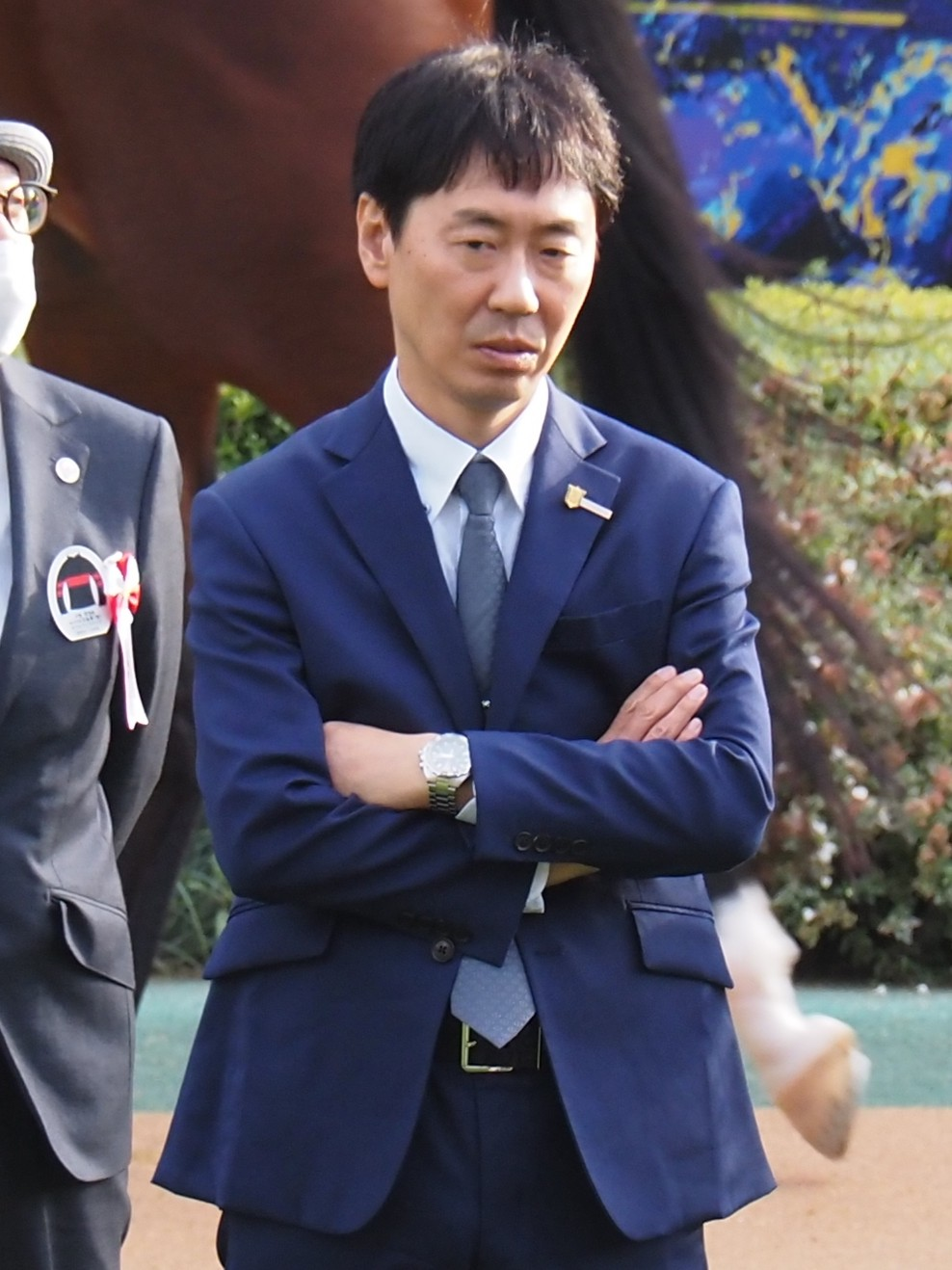
- Okumura in 2025

Personal information
- Native name: 奥村武
- Born: July 10, 1976 (age 50) Tokyo, Japan
- Education: Shibaura Institute of Technology

Horse racing career
- Sport: Horse racing

Takeshi Okumura (奥村武) is Japanese racehorse trainer.

== Career ==
On April 27, 2024, he won with Meiner Kellerius, becoming the 103rd active jockey to achieve 200 JRA wins.
