= Deep Sky (horse) =

Japanese-bred Thoroughbred racehorse

Deep Sky ディープスカイ
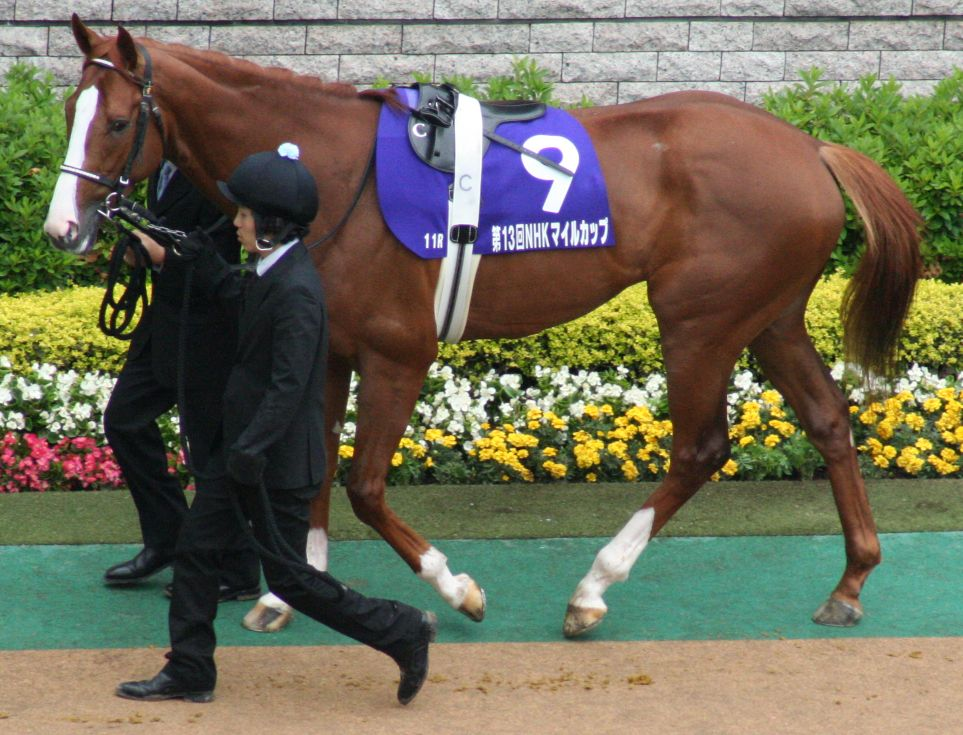
- Deep Sky winning NHK Mile Cup 2008 on May 11
- Sire: Agnes Tachyon
- Grandsire: Sunday Silence
- Dam: Abi
- Damsire: Chief's Crown
- Sex: Stallion
- Foaled: 24 April 2005
- Country: Japan
- Colour: Chestnut
- Breeder: Kasamatsu Bokujo
- Owner: Toshio Fukami
- Racing colours
- Trainer: Mitsugu Kon
- Jockey: Hirofumi Shii
- Record: 17: 5-7-3
- Earnings: 642,139,000 Yen

Major wins
- Mainichi Hai (2008); NHK Mile Cup (2008); Kobe Shimbun Hai (2008); Japanese Classic Race wins: Tokyo Yushun (2008)

Awards
- JRA Award for Best Three-Year-Old Colt (2008)
- Last updated on December 19, 2025

Deep Sky (Japanese: ディープスカイ, Hepburn: Dīpu Sukai; April 24, 2005) is a Japanese racehorse which won the 2008 Tokyo Yūshun and NHK Mile Cup.

== Race career ==
=== 2007 ===
In 2007, Deep Sky was two years old, and was left in the care of the trainer Mitsugu Kon. Deep Sky made his debut in October 2007; however he was unable to win in the four races he raced as a two year old.

=== 2008 ===
Deep Sky raced six times and finally won for the first time at the end of January 2008. Deep Sky also bested the horse Katsutoshi two races afterwards, but neither was able to win. However, Deep Sky won in Mainichi Hai at the end of March 2008, allowing entry in the NHK Mile Cup which is one of the big races for a three-year-old horse.

Deep Sky entered the NHK Mile Cup on schedule. Deep Sky ran through the inside, and by the last straight overtook Black Shell. Deep Sky was then entered in Tokyo Yūshun and subsequently won the race.

After winning the Tokyo Tokyo Yūshun, Deep Sky took a prolonged break with either the Kikka Sho or Tenno Sho in mind as his next race. He won the Kobe Shimbun Hai in September 28, which was a trail race for the Kikka Sho, but ultimately opted to run in the Tenno Sho. At the Tenno Sho, Deep Sky finished third behind the more favored Vodka and Daiwa Scarlet. The following month Deep Sky ran in the Japan Cup, where he raced with Vodka once again. Deep Sky was able to best Vodka this time, but both lost to Screen Hero.

=== 2009 ===
At the awards ceremony for the JRA Awards, Kon announced that he intended to race Deep Sky at the Prix de l'Arc de Triomphe if the horse won that year's Yasuda Kinen and Takarazuka Kinen. However, Deep Sky was not able to win either races, with the horse losing once again to Vodka at Yasuda, and to Dream Journey at Takarazuka. The horse was put to pasture at the Fantast Club in Hidaka with the intention to race in the autumn season again. It was there, however, that the horse's left forearm was found to be suffering from tendonitis, and the decision was made to retire him to stud soon after. A retirement ceremony was held at Sapporo Racecourse on August 30 and his JRA registration was taken down.

== Racing form ==
Deep Sky raced in 17 races and achieved five wins with seven second placed and three third placed finish. The data available is based on JBIS and netkeiba.com.

Date	Track	Race	Grade	Distance (Condition)	Entry	HN	Odds (Favored)	Finish	Time	Margins	Jockey	Winner (Runner-up)
2007 – two-year-old season
Oct 8	Kyoto	2YO debut		1400m（Firm）	8	6	2.8（2）	4th	1:24.4	0.8	Daisaku Matsuda	A Shin Forward
Nov 4	Kyoto	2YO maiden		1600m（Firm）	10	8	8.6（5）	2nd	1:35.4	0.1	Yutaka Take	Lord Balius
Nov 24	Tokyo	2YO maiden		1800m（Firm）	17	14	5.3（3）	2nd	1:49.4	0.2	Yutaka Take	Pisa No Emirates
Dec 16	Chukyo	2YO maiden		1800m（Firm）	16	7	2.5（1）	2nd	1:49.6	0.1	Akiyoshi Nomoto	My Sidekick
2008 – three-year-old season
Jan 13	Kyoto	3YO maiden		2000m（Good）	16	13	4.6（2）	9th	2:05.6	0.9	Shinji Fujita	Magellan
Jan 26	Kyoto	3YO maiden		1800m（Firm）	14	5	6.6（4）	1st	1:50.9	–0.2	Shinji Fujita	(Shining Day)
Feb 17	Tokyo	3YO allowance	1W	1600m（Firm）	16	7	6.2（3）	2nd	1:36.7	0.0	Akihide Tsumura	Koyo Marine
Mar 1	Hanshin	Arlington Cup	3	1600m（Firm）	12	3	36.3（10）	3rd	1:36.7	0.3	Hideaki Miyuki	Dantsu Kissui
Mar 29	Hanshin	Mainichi Hai	3	1800m（Firm）	14	2	8.7（6）	1st	1:46.0	–0.4	Hirofumi Shii	(Admire Commando)
May 11	Tokyo	NHK Mile Cup	1	1600m（Good）	18	9	4.3（1）	1st	1:34.2	–0.3	Hirofumi Shii	(Black Shell)
Jun 1	Tokyo	Tokyo Yushun	1	2400m（Firm）	18	1	3.6（1）	1st	2:26.7	–0.2	Hirofumi Shii	(Smile Jack)
Sep 28	Hanshin	Kobe Shimbun Hai	2	2400m（Firm）	18	1	2.0（1）	1st	2:25.3	0.0	Hirofumi Shii	(Black Shell)
Nov 2	Tokyo	Tenno Sho (Autumn)	1	2000m（Firm）	17	2	4.1（3）	3rd	1:57.2	0.0	Hirofumi Shii	Vodka
Nov 30	Tokyo	Japan Cup	1	2400m（Firm）	17	9	3.4（1）	2nd	2:25.6	0.1	Hirofumi Shii	Screen Hero
2009 – four-year-old season
Apr 5	Hanshin	Sankei Osaka Hai	2	2000m（Firm）	12	11	1.6（1）	2nd	1:59.7	0.0	Hirofumi Shii	Dream Journey
Jun 7	Tokyo	Yasuda Kinen	1	1600m（Firm）	18	6	3.7（2）	2nd	1:33.6	0.1	Hirofumi Shii	Vodka
Jun 28	Hanshin	Takarazuka Kinen	1	2200m（Firm）	14	11	1.6（1）	3rd	2:11.6	0.3	Hirofumi Shii	Dream Journey

Legend:
Turf

== Stud career ==
Deep Sky stood stud at the Darley Japan Stallion Complex but was moved to the East Stud in 2015. Before retiring from stud in 2021, he sired two Grade 1 race winners; Sound Sky (Zen-Nippon Nisai Yushun) and Kyoei Gere (Japan Dirt Derby).

He retired from stud in 2021 and is pensioned at the Hidaka Horse Friends after being taken in by the Retired Horse Association.

== Pedigree ==
Pedigree of Deep Sky
Sire Agnes Tachyon ch. 1998	Sunday Silence br. 1986	Halo	Hail to Reason
Sire Agnes Tachyon ch. 1998	Sunday Silence br. 1986	Halo	Cosmah
Sire Agnes Tachyon ch. 1998	Sunday Silence br. 1986	Wishing Well	Understanding
Sire Agnes Tachyon ch. 1998	Sunday Silence br. 1986	Wishing Well	Mountain Flower
Sire Agnes Tachyon ch. 1998	Agnes Flora b. 1987	Royal Ski	Raja Baba
Sire Agnes Tachyon ch. 1998	Agnes Flora b. 1987	Royal Ski	Coz o'Nijinsky
Sire Agnes Tachyon ch. 1998	Agnes Flora b. 1987	Agnes Lady	Remand
Sire Agnes Tachyon ch. 1998	Agnes Flora b. 1987	Agnes Lady	Ikoma Eikan
Dam Abi ch. 1995	Chief's Crown b. 1982	Danzig	Northern Dancer
Dam Abi ch. 1995	Chief's Crown b. 1982	Danzig	Pas de Nom
Dam Abi ch. 1995	Chief's Crown b. 1982	Six Crowns	Secretariat
Dam Abi ch. 1995	Chief's Crown b. 1982	Six Crowns	Chris Evert
Dam Abi ch. 1995	Carmelized b. 1990	Key to the Mint	Graustark
Dam Abi ch. 1995	Carmelized b. 1990	Key to the Mint	Key Bridge
Dam Abi ch. 1995	Carmelized b. 1990	Carmelize	Cornish Prince
Dam Abi ch. 1995	Carmelized b. 1990	Carmelize	Miss Carmie
