= Tokai Derby =

Japanese thoroughbred race

- Location: Nagoya Racecourse
- Inaugurated: 1971
- Race type: Thoroughbred - Flat racing

Race information
- Distance: 2,100 meters (about 10.5 furlongs / 1.3 miles)
- Surface: Dirt
- Qualification: Three-year-olds from the Tokai region
- Purse: ¥7,000,000; 1st: ¥ 1,050,000

The Tokai Derby (in Japanese: 東海優駿), is a race for three-year-olds from the Tokai region in the Aichi Prefectural Horse Racing Association.

== Race details ==
The race was established in 1971. It was known as the "Tokai Yugo" and had multiple name changes before becoming the "Tokai Derby".

The race was originally 1,800 meters long and briefly ran on turf. Starting in 1980, it was run over 1,900 meters until 2022. The Tokai Derby had its distance increased to 2,000 meters for the 2022 running of the race, then again to 2,100 meters starting with the 2023 running.

== Winners since 2014 ==
Year	Winner	Jockey	Trainer	Time
2014	Cage Kinkan	Masayoshi Aoyagi	Masaya Suzuki	2:03.8
2015	Bazooka	Takahiro Imai	Yoshi Kawanisho	2:04.3
2016	Katsugeki Kitokito	Masaaki Ohata	Takeo Nishimi	2:06.8
2017	Dreams Line	Masaaki Ohata	Yoshi Kawanisho	2:07.5
2018	Vip Raising	Mikio Fujiwara	Hiroshi Kanno	2:05.9
2019	M S Queen	Takahiro Imai	Naoto Takeshita	2:03.2
2020	New Town Girl	Tomonori Sato	Teruya Tsunoda	2:05.9
2021	Tomiken Shairi	Takahiro Imai	Daisuke Mesaku	2:04.7
2022	Tanino Tabito	Makoto Okabe	Teruya Tsunoda	2:12.6
2023	Seven Colors	Sachio Yamada	Tsuyoshi Kawanishi	2:18.2
2024	Fuku Pygmalion	Takahiro Imai	Hideki Uto	2:17.7
2025	Sanyo Teio	Junki Mochizuki	Kazuhisa Yamada	2:19.2
2026	Astra Bianco	Satoshi Hosokawa	Teruya Tsunoda	2:16.3

== Past winners ==
Past winners include:

- 1971: Shinano Hoster
- 1972: Shinano Ruler
- 1973: One Eight
- 1974: Sun China
- 1975: Tokino Kinzan
- 1976: Keiunzan
- 1977: Brave Boy
- 1978: Ishino Sammy
- 1979: Ryu Walk
- 1980: Izumi Dapper
- 1981: Ryu Meiji
- 1982: Gold Ret
- 1983: Ryu French
- 1984: Ryu Zuisho
- 1985: Fujino Jiyotsu King
- 1986: Minami Madonna
- 1987: Wise Rullah
- 1988: Fujino Northern
- 1989: San Rinaru
- 1990: S.M.Great
- 1991: Max Brain
- 1992: Tomishino Porunga
- 1993: Sabrina Cherry
- 1994: Life Asahi
- 1995: Loui Boss Gold
- 1996: Cheers Silence
- 1997: Shimpu Raiden
- 1998: Wing Arrow
- 1999: Taiki Herakles
- 2000: Agnes Digital
- 2001: Narita On the Turf
- 2002: Homan Cute
- 2003: Big Wolf
- 2004: Takara Adjudi
- 2005: Centrair Riki
- 2006: Horai Missile
- 2007: Maruyo Phoenix
- 2008: Hishi Worthy
- 2009: Dynamite Body
- 2010: Helene
- 2011: Amuro
- 2012: Meiner Segment
- 2013: Water Pride

== See also ==
- Horse racing in Japan
- List of Japanese flat horse races
