= Copa Republica Argentina =

Copa Republica Argentina アルゼンチン共和国杯
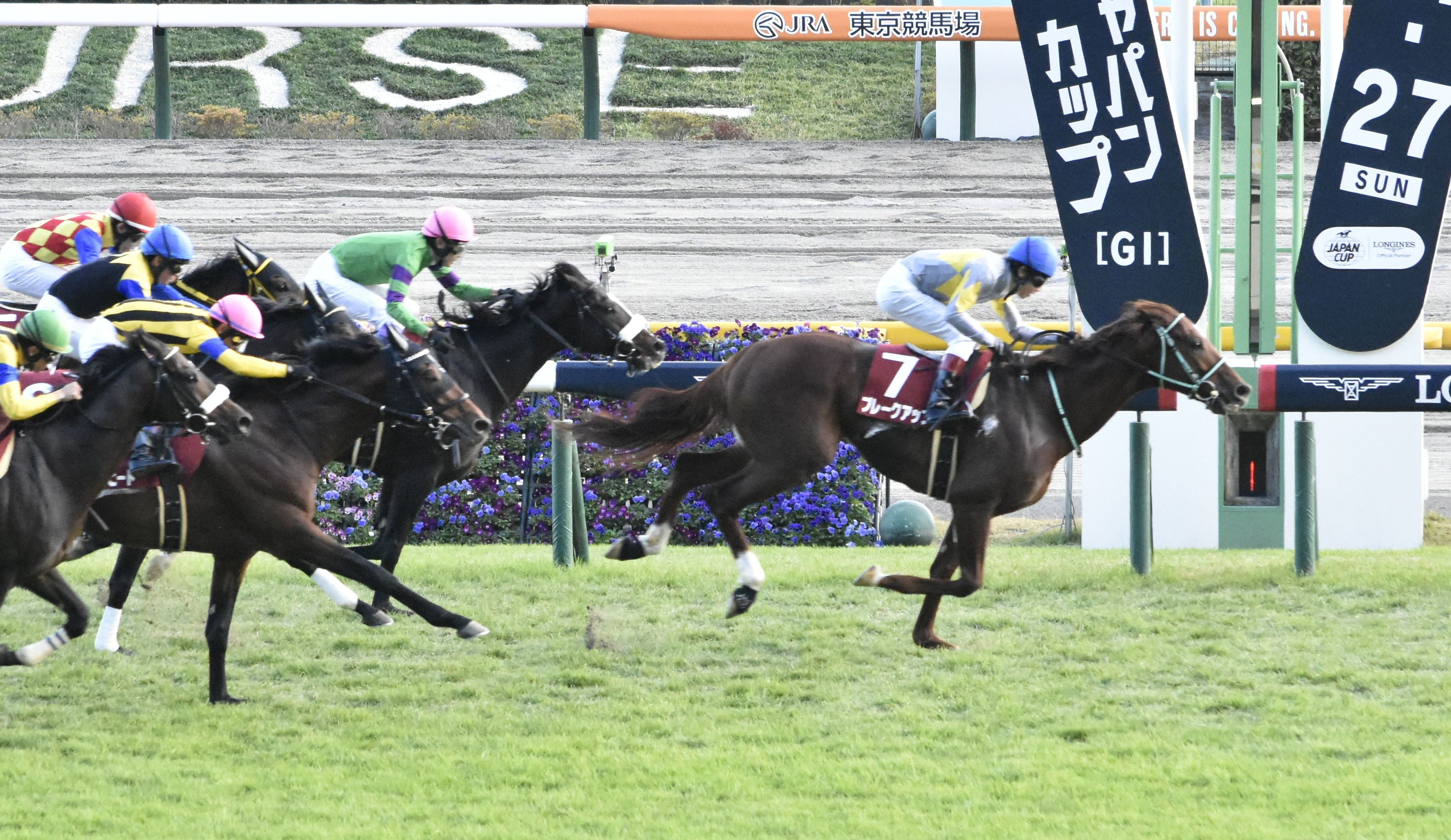
- Breakup winning the 2022 Copa Republica Argentina
- Class: Grade 2
- Location: Tokyo Racecourse, Fuchū
- Inaugurated: 1963
- Race type: Thoroughbred Flat racing

Race information
- Distance: 2500 metres
- Surface: Turf
- Track: Left-handed
- Qualification: 3-y-o +, Colts & Fillies
- Weight: Handicap
- Purse: ¥ 123,120,000 (as of 2026): 1st: ¥ 57,000,000; 2nd: ¥ 23,000,000; 3rd: ¥ 14,000,000

The Copa Republica Argentina (Japanese アルゼンチン共和国杯) is a Japanese Grade 2 handicap horse race for Thoroughbred colts and fillies aged three and over run over a distance of 2,500 metres at Tokyo Racecourse.

The race is run in November and serves as a trial race for the Japan Cup and the Arima Kinen.

It was first run in 1963 over 2300 metres. The distance was changed to 3200 metres in 1966, 2600 metres in 1969, 2500 metres in 1970 and 2400 metres in 1972. The race distance has been fixed at 2500 metres since 1981.

Among the winners of the race have been Admire Jupiter, Screen Hero, Tosen Jordan, Gold Actor, Cheval Grand and Suave Richard.

== Records ==
Speed record:

- 2:29.0 Hayayakko – 2024

Most successful horse (2 wins):

- Eyeful – 1976, 1977
- Minagawa Manna – 1982, 1983
- Authority – 2020, 2021

== Winners since 1992 ==
Year	Winner	Age	Jockey	Trainer	Owner	Time
1992	Minamino Akari	4	Shinji Fujita	Hozumi Shono	Tsutsumi Iwatani	2:33.5
1993	Monsieur Siecle	5	Shinji Fujita	Minoru Kobayashi	Keiichi Fujitate	2:32.6
1994	Machikane Allegro	3	Hiroshi Kawachi	Shuichi Asami	Masuo Hosokawa	2:31.3
1995	Go Go Z	4	Yoshiyuki Muramoto	Hitoshi Arai	Yoshinobu Hayashi	2:31.3
1996	L-Way Win	6	Katsumi Minai	Noriaki Tsubo	Takao Zako	2:31.8
1997	Taiki El Dorado	3	Yukio Okabe	Kazuo Fujisawa	Taiki Farm	2:32.2
1998	Yusei Top Run	5	Tetsuzo Sato	Hidetaka Otonashi	Asahi Club	2:32.9
1999	Marvelous Timer	5	Hitoshi Matoba	Terumasa Yano	Sadao Sasahara	2:32.0
2000	Matikane Kinnohosi	4	Yukio Okabe	Kazuo Fujisawa	Masuo Hosokawa	2:33.9
2001	Tokai Oza	4	Masayoshi Ebina	Shoichi Matsumoto	Masanori Uchimura	2:32.0
2002	Sunrise Jaeger	4	Yukio Okabe	Hajime Fukunaga	Matsuoka	2:30.6
2003	Active Bio	6	Koshiro Takeshi	Hiroki Sakiyama	Bio	2:31.9
2004	Leningrad	5	Norihiro Yokoyama	Hidetaka Otonashi	Hideko Kondo	2:33.8
2005	Sakura Century	5	Tetsuzo Sato	Yasuo Tomomichi	Sakura Commerce	2:32.4
2006	Tosho Knight	6	Tomoharu Bushizawa	Kuzukada Yasuda	Eisei Fujita	2:31.0
2007	Admire Jupiter	4	Issei Murata	Yasuo Tomomichi	Riichi Kondo	2:30.9
2008	Screen Hero	4	Masayoshi Ebina	Yuichi Shikato	Teruya Yoshida	2:30.8
2009	Miyabi Ranveli	6	Yuichi Kitamura	Keiji Kato	Yoshikatsu Murakami	2:30.9
2010	Tosen Jordan	4	Kousei Miura	Yasutoshi Ikee	Takaya Shimakawa	2:30.0
2011	Trailblazer	4	Katsumi Ando	Yasutoshi Ikee	Koji Maeda	2:31.5
2012	Lelouch	4	Norihiro Yokoyama	Kazuo Fujisawa	Hidetoshi Yamamoto	2:29.9
2013	Asuka Kurichan	6	Keita Tosaki	Naosuke Sugai	Hiroharu Kurimoto	2:30.9
2014	Fame Game	4	Hiroshi Kitamura	Yoshitada Munakata	Sunday Racing	2:30.5
2015	Gold Actor	4	Hayato Yoshida	Tadashige Nakagawa	Kaname Ishiro	2:34.0
2016	Cheval Grand	4	Yuichi Fukunaga	Yasuo Tomomichi	Kazuhiro Sasaki	2:33.4
2017	Suave Richard	3	Mirco Demuro	Yasushi Shono	NICKS	2:30.0
2018	Perform A Promise	6	Colm O'Donoghue	Hideaki Fujiwara	Sunday Racing	2:33.7
2019	Muito Obrigado	5	Norihiro Yokoyama	Koichi Tsunoda	Ichikawa Yoshimi Holdings	2:31.5
2020	Authority	3	Christophe Lemaire	Tetsuya Kimura	Silk Racing	2:31.6
2021	Authority	4	Christophe Lemaire	Tetsuya Kimura	Silk Racing	2:32.4
2022	Breakup	4	Hironobu Tanabe	Yoichi Kuroiwa	Toako Abe	2:31.1
2023	Zeffiro	4	João Moreira	Yasutoshi Ikee	Shadai Race Horse	2:29.9
2024	Hayayakko	8	Yutaka Yoshida	Sakae Kunieda	Kaneko Makoto Holdings	2:29.0
2025	Mystery Way	7	Hiroki Matsumoto	Shinya Kobayashi	Shadai Race Horse Co. Ltd.	2:30.2
2026	Family Time	5	Akira Sugawara	Koichi Ishizaka	Toho Bussan Co. Ltd.	2:30.9

== Earlier winners ==
- 1963 – Emroan
- 1964 – Toast
- 1965 – Tosa Isami
- 1966 – Korehide
- 1967 – Riko
- 1968 – Speed Symboli
- 1969 – Mejiro Taiyo
- 1970 – Matsu Sedan
- 1971 – Mejiro Asama
- 1972 – Zenmatsu
- 1973 – Kuri Iwai
- 1974 – Toyo Asami
- 1975 – Kikuno O
- 1976 – Eyeful
- 1977 – Eyeful
- 1978 – Kane Minobu
- 1979 – Kane Mikasa
- 1980 – Blue Max
- 1981 – Western Jet
- 1982 – Minagawa Manna
- 1983 – Minagawa Manna
- 1984 – Mejiro Seaton
- 1985 – Inano Lover John
- 1986 – Sakura Sunny O
- 1987 – Kashima Wing
- 1988 – Legend Teio
- 1989 – Kuri Rotary
- 1990 – Mejiro Monterey
- 1991 – Yamanin Global

== See also ==
- Horse racing in Japan
- List of Japanese flat horse races
