= Daiwa Major =

Japanese-bred Thoroughbred racehorse (2001–2026)

Daiwa Major ダイワメジャー
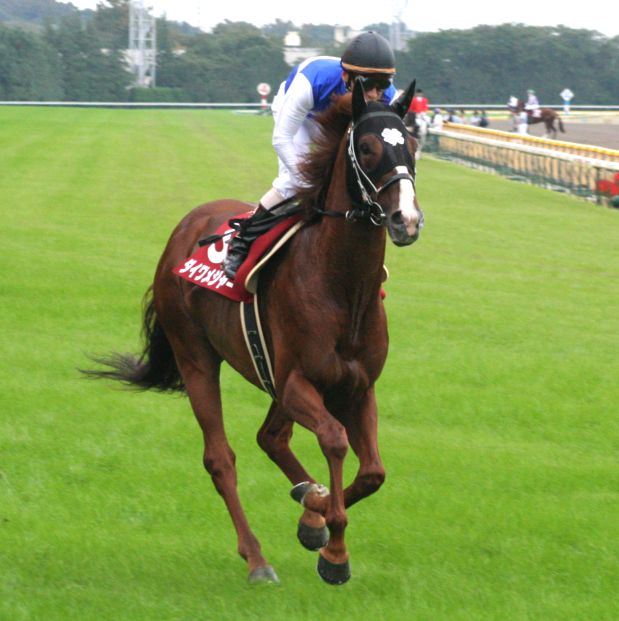
- Daiwa Major at Tokyo Racecourse in October 2005
- Breed: Thoroughbred
- Sire: Sunday Silence
- Grandsire: Halo
- Dam: Scarlet Bouquet
- Damsire: Northern Taste
- Sex: Stallion
- Foaled: April 8, 2001
- Died: January 20, 2026 (aged 24)
- Country: Japan
- Colour: Chestnut
- Breeder: Shadai Farm
- Owner: Keizo Oshiro
- Racing colours
- Trainer: Hiroyuki Uehara
- Jockey: Katsumi Ando
- Record: 28: 9-4-5
- Earnings: ¥1,061,810,900

Major wins
- Lord Derby Challenge Trophy (2005); Yomiuri Milers Cup (2006); Mainichi Ōkan (2006); Tennō Shō (Autumn) (2006); Mile Championship (2006, 2007); Yasuda Kinen (2007); Japanese Classic Race wins: Satsuki Shō (2004)

Awards
- JRA Award for Best Sprinter or Miler (2006, 2007)

Daiwa Major (Japanese: ダイワメジャー, Hepburn: Daiwa Mejā; April 8, 2001 – January 20, 2026) was a Japanese Thoroughbred racehorse and sire. A horse who excelled at distances of one to one and a quarter miles (1,600 to 2,000 m), he won the Satsuki Shō, the first leg of the Japanese Triple Crown in 2004. His greatest success, however, came later in his career when he won several of Japan's most important weight-for-age races including the Tennō Shō, the Yasuda Kinen and two runnings of the Mile Championship. He was twice named Japan's champion miler. Daiwa Major made a successful start to his stud career, siring a Group One winner in his first crop.

== Background ==
Daiwa Major was a chestnut horse with a white blaze bred by the Shadai Farm in Hokkaido. He was an unusually large Thoroughbred, standing 16 hands 2 1/2 inches (169 cm) high and weighing more than 530 kilograms during his racing career. He was sired by Sunday Silence, who won the 1989 Kentucky Derby, before retiring to stud in Japan where he was champion sire on thirteen consecutive occasions. His dam, Scarlet Bouquet, was a successful racemare, winning four times at Group Three level, who produced several other winners, most notably the filly Daiwa Scarlet. As a descendant of the American broodmare Your Hostess, she came from the same branch of Thoroughbred family 4-d which produced Majestic Prince, Secreto and Real Quiet. The horse was trained throughout his racing career by Hiroyuki Uehara.

== Racing career ==
=== 2003: two-year-old season ===
The racing career of Daiwa Major began on 27 December at Nakayama Racecourse where he contested a one-mile event for previously unraced horses. He finished second of the twelve runners, two lengths behind the winner.

=== 2004: three-year-old season ===
Daiwa Major recorded his first success by winning a nine furlong maiden race at Nakayama and then finished fourth in a race over the same course and distance a month later. Despite his modest form, he was moved up in class for the Group Two Spring Stakes and exceeded expectations by finishing third to Black Tide at odds of 72/1. In April, Daiwa Major was one of eighteen runners for the ten-furlong Satsuki Shō, the first leg of the Japanese Triple Crown. Ridden for the first time by the Italian jockey Mirco Demuro, he started a 31/1 outsider and won the Group One event by one and a quarter lengths from the favourite Cosmo Bulk. Daiwa Major failed to reproduce his best form in his remaining races that season. On 30 May he was moved up in distance for the Tokyo Yūshun (Japanese Derby) over 1 1/2 miles at Tokyo Racecourse and, on his first start away from Nakayama, finished sixth behind King Kamehameha. In the autumn he was tried in all-aged competition and was unplaced in the All-Comers Stakes at Nakayama before finishing last of the seventeen runners behind Zenno Rob Roy in the autumn running of the Tennō Shō. At the end of the year, the colt underwent surgery to correct a respiratory problem.

=== 2005: four-year-old season ===
Daiwa Major's only success in five starts as a four-year-old came on his debut when he won the Group Three Lord Derby Challenge Trophy at Nakayama in April. He then ran unplaced in the Yasuda Kinen in June and was beaten in a Group Three race at Niigata Racecourse in July. Returning in the autumn, he ran unplaced in the Group Two Mainichi Okan but then displayed much improved form when he finished second by a nose to Hat Trick in the Group One Mile Championship at Kyoto Racecourse in November.

=== 2006: five-year-old season ===
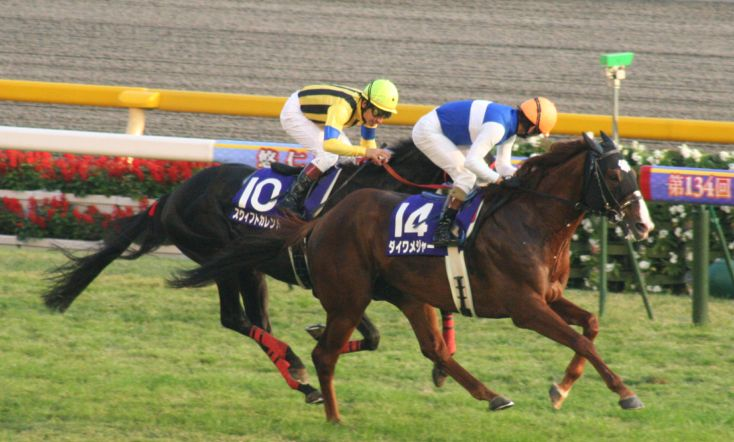
2006 autumn Tennō Shō: Daiwa Major beats Swift Current

Daiwa Major began his most successful season by finishing second to Balance of Game in the Nakayama Kinen in February. In April he recorded his most important victory for two years when he defeated the mare Dance in the Mood by three quarters of a length in the Milers' Cup at Hanshin Racecourse: in this race he was ridden for the first time by Katsumi Andō, who later became his regular jockey. In June he finished fourth behind the Hong Kong champion Bullish Luck in the Yasuda Kinen and was then fourth again behind Deep Impact in the eleven-furlong Takarazuka Kinen.

In October, Daiwa Major returned to win the Group Two Mainichi Okan and was then sent to Tokyo for the autumn edition of the Tennō Shō. He started at odds of 6/1 in a field which included Admire Moon, Dance in the Mood, Cosmo Bulk, Hat Trick, Sweep Tosho and Company. He raced in second place before taking the lead in the straight and winning by half a length from Swift Current with Admire Moon in third. On 19 November Daiwa Major started 13/10 favourite for the Group One Mile Championship at Kyoto Racecourse. Andō repeated his tactics from the Tennō Shō by positioning the horse in second place before going to the front in the straight and Daiwa Major held the late challenge of Dance in the Mood to win by a neck. In December, Daiwa Major was one of fourteen runners invited to contest the Arima Kinen over 12 1/2 furlongs at Nakayama. Racing well beyond his favoured distance, he finished third behind Deep Impact and Pop Rock.

At the end of the season, Daiwa Major won the JRA Award for Best Sprinter or Miler gaining 200 of the 289 available votes. He also received one vote in the polls for Japanese Horse of the Year and JRA Award for Best Older Male Horse, which was enough to place him second behind Deep Impact in both categories. In the 2006 World Thoroughbred Racehorse Rankings, he was ranked the 20th best racehorse in the world.

=== 2007: six-year-old season ===
In March 2007, Daiwa Major was sent to the United Arab Emirates to represent Japan in the nine-furlong Dubai Duty Free at Nad Al Sheba Racecourse. He finished third of the sixteen runners behind Admire Moon and the South African challenger Linngari. The unplaced horses included English Channel, Miesque's Approval and Lava Man. On his return to Japan, Daiwa Major won the Yasuda Kinen at the third attempt, beating Kongo Rikishio by a neck, with the Hong Kong champion Good Ba Ba unplaced. Andō praised the horse's performance, pointing out that he had been unsuited by the moderate pace, whilst Uehara expressed his relief that the horse had shown no ill effects from his trip to Dubai. Three weeks later the horse was moved up in distance for the Takarazuka Kinen and finished unplaced behind Admire Moon.

Daiwa Major's autumn campaign began disappointingly in October when he was beaten as the odds-on favourite for the Mainichi Okan and then finished unplaced behind Meisho Samson in the Tennō Shō. In November he returned to form to take the Mile Championship for the second successive time, as he "dug in gamely" to win by a neck from the four-year-old Super Hornet. Daiwa Major ended his racing career in December when he again moved up in distance to contest his second Arima Kinen. He finished third behind American racehorse Matsurida Gogh, with second place being taken by his sister Daiwa Scarlet. The unplaced runners included Meisho Samson, Vodka, Pop Rock and Delta Blues.

At the end of the season, Daiwa Major won his second JRA Award for Best Sprinter or Miler, gaining 234 of the 289 available votes. He also finished third in the poll for the Best Older Male Horse. In the 2007 World Thoroughbred Racehorse Rankings, Daiwa Major was ranked the 29th best racehorse in the world.

== Racing form ==
Daiwa Major won nine races and hit the podium nine more times out of 28 starts. This data is available based on JBIS, netkeiba and Emirates Racing Authority.

Date	Racecourse	Race	Grade	Distance (Condition)	Entry	HN	Odds (Favored)	Finish	Time	Margins	Jockey	Winner (Runner-up)
2003 – two-year-old season
Dec 28	Nakayama	2yo Newcomer		1,600 m (Firm)	12	6	2.0 (1)	2nd	1:36.9	0.0	Takanori Kikuzawa	Monster Road
2004 – three-year-old season
Jan 17	Nakayama	3yo Maiden		1,800 m (Fast)	16	14	1.9 (1)	1st	1:56.4	–1.5	Takanori Kikuzawa	(Fusaichi Baldr)
Feb 29	Nakayama	3yo Allowance	1W	1,800 m (Fast)	16	15	1.4 (1)	4th	1:57.0	0.8	Takanori Kikuzawa	Full of Fight
Mar 21	Nakayama	Spring Stakes	2	1,800 m (Good)	16	7	73.7 (11)	3rd	1:48.5	0.2	Takanori Kikuzawa	Black Tide
Apr 18	Nakayama	Satsuki Sho	1	2,000 m (Firm)	18	14	32.2 (10)	1st	1:58.6	–0.2	Mirco Demuro	(Cosmo Bulk)
May 30	Tokyo	Tokyo Yushun	1	2,400 m (Firm)	18	4	7.6 (4)	6th	2:24.3	1.0	Mirco Demuro	King Kamehameha
Sep 26	Nakayama	Sankei Sho All Comers	2	2,200 m (Good)	9	7	3.1 (2)	9th	2:15.0	1.6	Yoshitomi Shibata	Tosen Dandy
Oct 31	Tokyo	Tenno Sho (Autumn)	1	2,000 m (Good)	17	17	37.5 (12)	17th	2:02.9	4.0	Yoshitomi Shibata	Zenno Rob Roy
2005 – four-year-old season
Apr 3	Nakayama	Lord Derby Challenge Trophy	3	1,600 m (Firm)	16	5	5.8 (3)	1st	1:32.3	–0.3	Yoshitomi Shibata	(Cheers Message)
Jun 5	Tokyo	Yasuda Kinen	1	1,600 m (Firm)	18	3	6.8 (2)	8th	1:32.8	0.5	Yoshitomi Shibata	Asakusa Den'en
Jul 31	Niigata	Sekiya Kinen	3	1,600 m (Firm)	18	11	2.7 (1)	2nd	1:32.4	0.1	Norihiro Yokoyama	Sidewinder
Oct 9	Tokyo	Mainichi Okan	1	1,800 m (Good)	17	3	4.6 (1)	5th	1:47.0	0.5	Norihiro Yokoyama	Sunrise Pegasus
Nov 20	Kyoto	Mile Championship	1	1,600 m (Firm)	17	12	13.0 (4)	2nd	1:32.1	0.0	Christophe Lemaire	Hat Trick
2006 – five-year-old season
Feb 26	Nakayama	Nakayama Kinen	2	1,800 m (Soft)	12	1	2.1 (1)	2nd	1:49.7	0.8	Mirco Demuro	Balance of Game
Apr 15	Hanshin	Yomiuri Milers Cup	2	1,600 m (Good)	11	11	1.8 (1)	1st	1:36.2	–0.1	Katsumi Ando	(Dance in the Mood)
Jun 4	Tokyo	Yasuda Kinen	1	1,600 m (Firm)	18	1	5.8 (2)	4th	1:33.1	0.5	Katsumi Ando	Bullish Luck
Jun 25	Kyoto	Takarazuka Kinen	1	2,200 m (Good)	13	4	25.6 (4)	4th	2:14.1	1.1	Hirofumi Shii	Deep Impact
Oct 8	Tokyo	Mainichi Okan	2	1,800 m (Firm)	16	16	6.4 (3)	1st	1:45.5	0.0	Katsumi Ando	(Dance in the Mood)
Oct 29	Tokyo	Tenno Sho (Autumn)	1	2,000 m (Firm)	16	14	7.0 (4)	1st	1:58.8	–0.1	Katsumi Ando	(Swift Current)
Nov 19	Kyoto	Mile Championship	1	1,600 m (Firm)	18	10	2.3 (1)	1st	1:32.7	–0.1	Katsumi Ando	(Dance in the Mood)
Dec 24	Nakayama	Arima Kinen	1	2,500 m (Firm)	14	5	15.1 (3)	3rd	2:32.5	0.6	Katsumi Ando	Deep Impact
2007 – six-year-old season
Mar 31	Nad Al Sheba	Dubai Duty Free	1	1,777 m (Good)	16	13	11/2 (1)	3rd	1:48.7	0.8	Katsumi Ando	Admire Moon
Jun 3	Tokyo	Yasuda Kinen	1	1,600 m (Firm)	18	2	4.4 (2)	1st	1:32.3	0.0	Katsumi Ando	(Kongo Rikishio)
Jun 24	Hanshin	Takarazuka Kinen	1	2,200 m (Good)	18	11	7.0 (5)	12th	2:15.8	3.4	Katsumi Ando	Admire Moon
Oct 7	Tokyo	Mainichi Okan	2	1,800 m (Firm)	14	1	1.8 (1)	3rd	1:44.5	0.3	Katsumi Ando	Chosan
Oct 28	Tokyo	Tenno Sho (Autumn)	1	2,000 m (Good)	16	14	5.6 (3)	9th	1:59.3	0.9	Katsumi Ando	Meisho Samson
Nov 18	Kyoto	Mile Championship	1	1,600 m (Firm)	18	8	3.8 (1)	1st	1:32.7	0.0	Katsumi Ando	(Super Hornet)
Dec 23	Nakayama	Arima Kinen	1	2,500 m (Good)	15	4	15.2 (6)	3rd	2:34.2	0.6	Mirco Demuro	Matsurida Gogh

Legend:
Turf Dirt

== Stud record ==
Daiwa Major retired to become a breeding stallion at the Shadai Stallion Station. In his first season at stud he sired the NHK Mile Cup winner Curren Black Hill.

=== Major winners ===
c = colt, f = filly, g = gelding
bold = grade 1 stakes (GI/JpnI)

**Foaled**	**Name**	**Sex**	**Major Wins**
2009	Curren Black Hill	c	**NHK Mile Cup**, Mainichi Ōkan, New Zealand Trophy, Kokura Daishoten
2009	Daiwa Maggiore	c	Keio Hai Spring Cup, Hankyu Hai
2009	Epice Arome (Note: Dam for Star Anise.)	f	Centaur Stakes, Kokura Nisai Stakes
2009	Excellente Cave	f	Keisei Hai Autumn Handicap
2009	Tosen Benizakura	f	Fairy Stakes
2010	Copano Richard	c	**Takamatsunomiya Kinen**, Swan Stakes, Hankyu Hai, Churchill Downs Cup
2012	Bulldog Boss	c	**Japan Breeding Farms' Cup Classic**
2012	Logi Chalice	c	Lord Derby Challenge Trophy
2013	Ball Lightning	c	Keio Hai Nisai Stakes
2013	Major Emblem	f	**Hanshin Juvenile Fillies**, **NHK Mile Cup**, Daily Hai Queen Cup
2013	Nac Venus	f	Keeneland Cup
2013	Solveig	f	Fillies' Revue, Hakodate Sprint Stakes
2014	Miss Panthere	f	Hanshin Himba Stakes, Kyoto Himba Stakes, Turquoise Stakes (2017, 2018)
2014	Reine Minoru	f	**Oka Sho**, Kokura Nisai Stakes
2015	Frontier	c	Niigata Nisai Stakes
2016	Admire Mars	c	**Asahi Hai Futurity Stakes**, **NHK Mile Cup**, **Hong Kong Mile**, Daily Hai Nisai Stakes
2016	Nova Lenda	c	**Zen-Nippon Nisai Yushun**, Diolite Kinen
2017	Resistencia	f	**Hanshin Juvenile Fillies**, Centaur Stakes, Hankyu Hai, Fantasy Stakes
2018	Mondreise	c	Keio Hai Nisai Stakes
2019	Don Frankie (Note: Don Frankie is the heaviest horse to win the JRA graded stakes in Japan at 607 kg.)	c	Tokyo Hai, Procyon Stakes, Cluster Cup
2019	Matenro Orion	c	Shinzan Kinen
2019	Serifos	c	**Mile Championship**, Fuji Stakes, Niigata Nisai Stakes, Daily Hai Nisai Stakes
2020	Double Major	g	Prix Chaudenay, **Prix Royal-Oak** (2023, 2024), Prix Maurice de Nieuil, Prix Kergorlay (2024, 2025), Prix Gladiateur
2021	Ascoli Piceno	f	**Hanshin Juvenile Fillies**, **Victoria Mile**, 1351 Turf Sprint, Niigata Nisai Stakes, Keisei Hai Autumn Handicap
2021	Ecoro Bloom	c	New Zealand Trophy

== Death ==
Daiwa Major died in his stall on January 20, 2026, at the age of 24. According to staff, he had been in excellent health, active, and eating well up until his sudden collapse.

== Pedigree ==
Pedigree of Daiwa Major (JPN), chestnut horse 2001
Sire Sunday Silence (USA) 1986	Halo (USA); 1969	Hail to Reason	Turn-To
Sire Sunday Silence (USA) 1986	Halo (USA); 1969	Hail to Reason	Nothirdchance
Sire Sunday Silence (USA) 1986	Halo (USA); 1969	Cosmah	Cosmic Bomb
Sire Sunday Silence (USA) 1986	Halo (USA); 1969	Cosmah	Almahmoud
Sire Sunday Silence (USA) 1986	Wishing Well (USA); 1975	Understanding	Promised Land
Sire Sunday Silence (USA) 1986	Wishing Well (USA); 1975	Understanding	Pretty Ways
Sire Sunday Silence (USA) 1986	Wishing Well (USA); 1975	Mountain Flower	Montparnasse
Sire Sunday Silence (USA) 1986	Wishing Well (USA); 1975	Mountain Flower	Edel Weiss
Dam Scarlet Bouquet (JPN) 1988	Northern Taste (CAN); 1971	Northern Dancer	Nearctic
Dam Scarlet Bouquet (JPN) 1988	Northern Taste (CAN); 1971	Northern Dancer	Natalma
Dam Scarlet Bouquet (JPN) 1988	Northern Taste (CAN); 1971	Lady Victoria	Victoria Park
Dam Scarlet Bouquet (JPN) 1988	Northern Taste (CAN); 1971	Lady Victoria	Lady Angela
Dam Scarlet Bouquet (JPN) 1988	Scarlet Ink (USA); 1971	Crimson Satan	Spy Song
Dam Scarlet Bouquet (JPN) 1988	Scarlet Ink (USA); 1971	Crimson Satan	Papila
Dam Scarlet Bouquet (JPN) 1988	Scarlet Ink (USA); 1971	Consentida	Beau Max
Dam Scarlet Bouquet (JPN) 1988	Scarlet Ink (USA); 1971	Consentida	La Menina (Family 4-d)
