= Delta Blues (horse) =

Japanese-bred Thoroughbred racehorse (2001–2024)

Delta Blues; デルタブルース
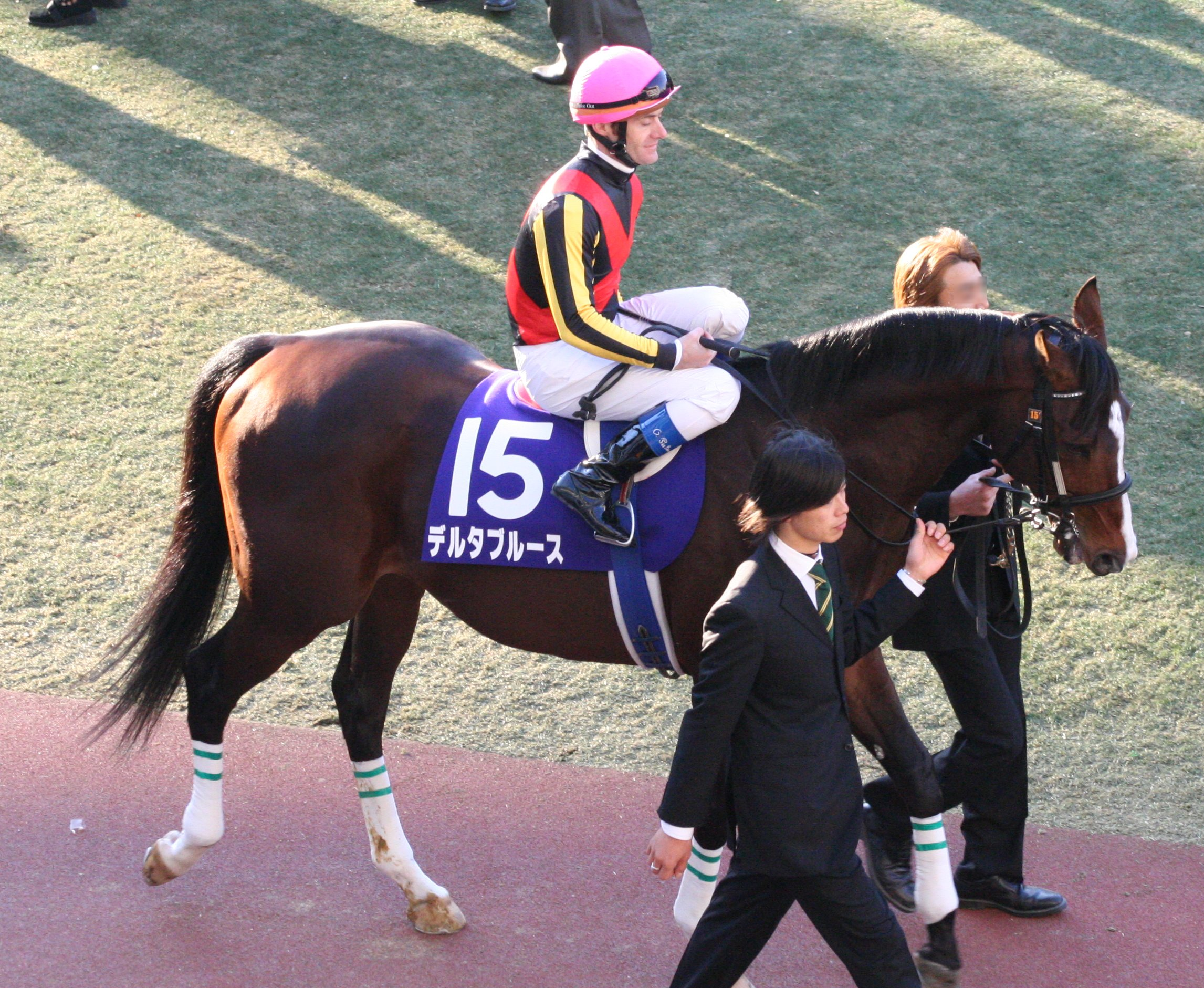
- Delta Blues
- Sire: Dance in the Dark (JPN)
- Grandsire: Sunday Silence (USA)
- Dam: Dixie Splash (USA)
- Damsire: Dixieland Band
- Sex: Stallion
- Foaled: 3 May 2001
- Died: 8 October 2024 (aged 23)
- Country: Japan
- Colour: Bay
- Breeder: Northern Farm
- Owner: Sunday Racing Co Ltd
- Racing colours
- Trainer: Katsuhiko Sumii
- Jockey: Yasunari Iwata
- Record: 32: 6-2-3
- Earnings: ¥401,562,000 +A$3,300,000 = US$8,492,037.

Major wins
- Stayers Stakes (2005); Melbourne Cup (2006); Japanese Classic Race wins: Kikuka Sho (2004)

Awards
- JRA Best Horse by Home-Bred Sire (2004); Australian Champion Stayer (2006/07)
- Last updated on 1 August 2011

Delta Blues (Japanese: デルタブルース, Hepburn: Deruta Burūsu; 3 May 2001 - 8 October 2024) was a Japanese Thoroughbred racehorse best known for winning the 2006 Melbourne Cup. He was the first Japanese horse to win the Cup. In doing so he defeated Pop Rock, another Japanese horse who shared Delta Blues' trainer, Katsuhiko Sumii. Delta Blues was more known as a stayer, where each of his graded stakes wins came in the over 3000 metres distance races.

== Racing career ==
=== Early career until the 2004 Kikuka Sho ===
Delta Blues was virtually unknown until his victory in the 2004 Kikuka Sho. Before that race, he only managed to get three wins in ten starts. When the gates open, he made an early sprints and tracked the leaders in a good position throughout the race. At the fourth corner, he proceed to advance and surpassed Cosmo Bulk, and held on to the lead from the late surging Hookipa Wave to win by one-and-a-quarters length. From the field, he also defeated Heart's Cry, Company and Suzuka Mambo. Delta Blues continued his good form by placing third in the Japan Cup in November 2004, three lengths behind the eventual Autumn Triple Crown winner, Zenno Rob Roy. He closed the year with a run in the Arima Kinen, where he finished fifth in a race where Zenno Rob Roy broke the speed record which still stands today. At the end of the year, Delta Blues won the Best Horse by Home-Bred Sire JRA award.

=== Inconsistent form in 2005 and Stayers Stakes title ===
In this season, Delta Blues placed fifth at the Copa Republica Argentina and eleventh in the Arima Kinen. In between those races, he ran in the Grade Two Stayers Stakes in 3 December. In the race, he lurked around the fourth place for most of times before surged forward on the inside track on the homestretch and caught Er Nova to win the race by a nose margin.

=== Australian triumph in 2006 ===
At the start of the year, Delta Blues had a rough start. He finished third in the Grade Two Hanshin Daishoten on 19 March where Deep Impact comfortably won four lengths in front of him, and 10th in the Grade One Tenno Sho (Spring) on 30 April. Then, the owner decided to tried him for the overseas campaign in Australia. He started positively in which he finished third in the 2006 Caulfield Cup after racing wide throughout the race. In the 2006 Melbourne Cup, Delta Blues was ridden by Japanese jockey Yasunari Iwata who was the winner of the 2005 19th World Super Jockey Series. Delta Blues won the Melbourne Cup by a nose ahead of Pop Rock, with Maybe Better finishing in third place. Prior to the race, stable spokesman Keita Tanaka characterised Delta Blues as a "lazy horse", and trainer Sumii characterised him as "tough". He finished the season with a sixth-place finish in the Arima Kinen back in Japan.

=== Winless, hiatus and retirement in 3 years (2007–2009) ===
For the rest for his career, Delta Blues failed to perform well in the subsequent campaign in which his best finishes was only a fourth-place in the 2007 Hanshin Daishoten. There was an attempt for a title defence in Australia alongside Pop Rock but it was never fulfilled due to Equine Influenza outbreak. In October 2008, he was supposed to start at the Kyoto Daishoten after a prolonged rest on the first half of the campaign but a pitted hole was discovered in his right foreleg, forcing him to withdraw. After a 16th-place finished at the 2009 Meguro Kinen, Delta Blues was being retired and assigned as a riding horse at the Northern Horse Park in Tomakomai, Hokkaido.

== Racing form ==
Delta Blues won six races and placed five times more out of 32 starts. This data is available on JBIS, netkeiba and Racing Australia.

Date	Racecourse	Race	Grade	Distance (Condition)	Entry	HN	Odds (Favored)	Finish	Time	Margins	Jockey	Winner (Runner-up)
2003 – two-year-old season
Nov 29	Kyoto	2yo Newcomer		1,600 m (Soft)	14	13	6.9 (3)	7th	1:40.3	0.4	Koshiro Take	Black Helios
Dec 6	Hanshin	2yo Maiden		2,000 m (Firm)	11	3	9.1 (4)	2nd	2:03.0	0.1	Christophe Soumillon	Piena Only One
2004 – three-year-old season
Jan 17	Kokura	3yo Maiden		2,000 m (Good)	18	1	1.4 (1)	2nd	2:02.8	0.2	Yutaka Take	Meiner Digno
Jan 25	Kokura	3yo Maiden		2,000 m (Firm)	16	11	2.8 (1)	4th	2:04.9	1.4	Koshiro Take	Meiner Dresden
Feb 8	Kyoto	Baika Sho	ALW (1W)	2,400 m (Firm)	12	6	8.6 (2)	4th	2:29.8	0.5	Yasunari Iwata	Meiner Dresden
Apr 17	Fukushima	3yo Maiden		2,000 m (Firm)	16	11	2.7 (1)	1st	2:00.6	–0.1	Koshiro Take	(Grass Hunter)
May 1	Tokyo	Aoba Sho	2	2,400 m (Firm)	17	15	152.3 (13)	13th	2:26.8	2.7	Hiroki Goto	Higher Game
May 23	Tokyo	3yo Allowance	1W	2,400 m (Good)	7	5	1.4 (1)	1st	2:29.8	0.0	Katsumi Ando	(Meiner Gust)
Sep 20	Hanshin	Hyogo Tokubetsu	ALW (2W)	2,500 m (Firm)	8	1	7.7 (4)	5th	2:33.0	0.8	Hiroki Goto	Bullet Lane
Oct 2	Nakayama	Kujukuri Tokubetsu	ALW (2W)	2,500 m (Firm)	9	2	1.8 (1)	1st	2:34.7	–0.2	Yukio Okabe	(Yuwa Kingston)
Oct 24	Kyoto	Kikuka Sho	1	3,000 m (Firm)	18	18	45.1 (8)	1st	3:05.7	–0.2	Yasunari Iwata	(Hookipa Wave)
Nov 28	Tokyo	Japan Cup	1	2,400 m (Firm)	16	7	13.4 (7)	3rd	2:24.8	0.6	Katsumi Ando	Zenno Rob Roy
Dec 26	Nakayama	Arima Kinen	1	2,500 m (Firm)	15	10	8.9 (4)	5th	2:30.0	0.5	Davy Bonilla	Zenno Rob Roy
2005 – four-year-old season
Nov 6	Tokyo	Copa Republica Argentina	2	2,500 m (Firm)	18	11	4.2 (1)	5th	2:33.1	0.7	Olivier Peslier	Sakura Century
Dec 3	Nakayama	Stayers Stakes	2	3,600 m (Firm)	11	6	1.8 (1)	1st	3:47.7	0.0	Olivier Peslier	(Er Nova)
Dec 25	Nakayama	Arima Kinen	1	2,500 m (Firm)	16	15	11.5 (3)	11th	2:33.0	1.1	Olivier Peslier	Heart's Cry
2006 – five-year-old season
Feb 18	Kyoto	Kyoto Kinen	2	2,200 m (Firm)	10	3	6.3 (3)	5th	2:13.9	0.4	Olivier Peslier	Six Sense
Mar 19	Hanshin	Hanshin Daishoten	2	3,000 m (Good)	9	8	7.4 (2)	3rd	3:10.1	1.3	Yasunari Iwata	Deep Impact
Apr 30	Kyoto	Tenno Sho (Spring)	1	3,200 m (Firm)	17	9	24.5 (4)	10th	3:15.7	2.3	Yasunari Iwata	Deep Impact
Oct 21	Caulfield	Caulfield Cup	1	2,400 m (Good)	18	14	80/1 (15)	3rd	2:27.8	0.1	Nash Rawiller	Tawqeet
Nov 7	Flemington	Melbourne Cup	1	3,200 m (Good)	23	10	17/1 (6)	1st	3:21.5	0.0	Yasunari Iwata	(Pop Rock)
Dec 24	Nakayama	Arima Kinen	1	2,500 m (Firm)	14	2	39.0 (9)	6th	2:32.7	0.8	Yasunari Iwata	Deep Impact
2007 – six-year-old season
Mar 18	Hanshin	Hanshin Daishoten	2	3,000 m (Firm)	11	1	8.2 (4)	4th	3:08.4	0.1	Yasunari Iwata	Eye Popper
Apr 29	Kyoto	Tenno Sho (Spring)	1	3,200 m (Firm)	16	15	4.6 (3)	12th	3:15.2	1.1	Yasunari Iwata	Meisho Samson
Oct 7	Kyoto	Kyoto Daishoten	2	2,400 m (Firm)	10	2	13.3 (5)	5th	2:25.1	0.3	Yuga Kawada	Inti Raimi
Oct 28	Tokyo	Tenno Sho (Autumn)	1	2,000 m (Good)	16	4	48.0 (12)	12th	1:59.7	1.3	Yuga Kawada	Meisho Samson
Nov 25	Tokyo	Japan Cup	1	2,400 m (Firm)	18	18	147.2 (14)	5th	2:25.1	0.4	Yuga Kawada	Admire Moon
Dec 23	Nakayama	Arima Kinen	1	2,500 m (Good)	15	13	59.6 (10)	12th	2:35.7	2.1	Yuga Kawada	Matsurida Gogh
Dec 29	Ohi	Tokyo Daishoten	JPN1	2,000 m (Muddy)	15	6	16.2 (5)	12th	2:07.3	4.1	Yasunari Iwata	Vermilion
2009 – eight-year-old season
Mar 22	Hanshin	Hanshin Daishoten	2	3,000 m (Soft)	12	5	36.5 (10)	6th	3:14.4	1.2	Yuga Kawada	Asakusa Kings
May 3	Kyoto	Tenno Sho (Spring)	1	3,200 m (Firm)	18	13	47.6 (13)	10th	3:16.2	1.8	Yasunari Iwata	Meiner Kitz
May 31	Tokyo	Meguro Kinen	2	2,500 m (Heavy)	18	10	53.0 (14)	16th	2:43.9	4.9	Yasunari Iwata	Miyabi Ranveli

Legend:
Turf Dirt

- All JPN graded race was labeled as "Listed" internationally

== Awards ==
- Winner of the 2004 Best Horse by Home-Bred Sire JRA award.
- Winner of the 2006–2007 Australian Champion Stayer

== Breeding ==
Delta Blues was sired by Dance in the Dark with the dam Dixie Splash (sire Dixieland Band). The breeder was Northern Farm.

Dance in the Dark won the Kikuka Sho (Japanese St. Leger), and was the son of "magnificent US-bred Sunday Silence, the ill-fated sire who has been unmatched in Japanese breeding history".

Pedigree of Delta Blues (JPN), bay stallion, 2001
Sire Dance in the Dark (JPN) B. 1993	Sunday Silence (USA)	Halo (USA)	Hail to Reason (USA)
Sire Dance in the Dark (JPN) B. 1993	Sunday Silence (USA)	Halo (USA)	Cosmah (USA)
Sire Dance in the Dark (JPN) B. 1993	Sunday Silence (USA)	Wishing Well (USA)	Understanding(USA)
Sire Dance in the Dark (JPN) B. 1993	Sunday Silence (USA)	Wishing Well (USA)	Mountain Flower (USA)
Sire Dance in the Dark (JPN) B. 1993	Dancing Key (USA)	Nijinsky (CAN)	Northern Dancer (CAN)
Sire Dance in the Dark (JPN) B. 1993	Dancing Key (USA)	Nijinsky (CAN)	Flaming Page (CAN)
Sire Dance in the Dark (JPN) B. 1993	Dancing Key (USA)	Key Partner (USA)	Key to the Mint (USA)
Sire Dance in the Dark (JPN) B. 1993	Dancing Key (USA)	Key Partner (USA)	Native Partner (USA)
Dam Dixie Splash (USA)	Dixieland Band (USA)	Northern Dancer (CAN)	Nearctic (CAN)
Dam Dixie Splash (USA)	Dixieland Band (USA)	Northern Dancer (CAN)	Natalma (USA)
Dam Dixie Splash (USA)	Dixieland Band (USA)	Mississippi Mud (USA)	Delta Judge (USA)
Dam Dixie Splash (USA)	Dixieland Band (USA)	Mississippi Mud (USA)	Sand Buggy (USA)
Dam Dixie Splash (USA)	Ocean Jewel (USA)	Alleged (USA)	Hoist The Flag (USA)
Dam Dixie Splash (USA)	Ocean Jewel (USA)	Alleged (USA)	Princess Pout (USA)
Dam Dixie Splash (USA)	Ocean Jewel (USA)	Lady Offshore (USA)	Sir Ivor (USA)
Dam Dixie Splash (USA)	Ocean Jewel (USA)	Lady Offshore (USA)	Bonnie Google (USA)

== Retirement and death ==
After his riding career ends, he was sent to the Old Friends Japan, a retirement and retraining facility for racehorses to spend the rest of his life. Delta Blues died due to complications from laminitis there on 8 October 2024. He was 23.

== Namesake ==
Australian rail operator CFCL Australia named locomotive CF4401 after the horse. In 2026, A prosperity garden at the Flemington Racecourse was built and renamed as Delta Blues Garden as a tribute to his success in 2006 Melbourne Cup.

== See also ==
- List of Melbourne Cup winners
