= 2006 Melbourne Cup =

Australian horse race

- Melbourne Cup
- Location: Flemington Racecourse; Melbourne, Australia
- Date: 7 November 2006
- Winning horse: Delta Blues
- Jockey: Yasunari Iwata
- Trainer: Katsuhiko Sumii
- Surface: Grass
- Attendance: 106,691

Delta Blues in front again from Mandela, 300 left to go, Maybe Better coming on, Zipping battlingly strongly, Pop Rock joining in. Delta Blues in front at the 200, Pop Rock his danger on the outside. Delta Blues by a length, Pop Rock coming at him, Japan 1-2. Oliver weals the whip. Pop Rock trying to get to Delta Blues. Delta Blues and Pop Rock they come to the line oh very close, Delta Blues maybe a nose to Pop Rock, very little between them!

— Commentator Greg Miles describes the climax of the race

The 2006 Melbourne Cup was the 146th running of the Melbourne Cup, a prestigious Australian Thoroughbred horse race. The race, run over 3,200 metres (1.988 mi), was held on 7 November 2006 at Melbourne's Flemington Racecourse.

The winner of the 2006 Melbourne Cup was Delta Blues, ridden by Yasunari Iwata, which won by a nose ahead of Pop Rock, with Maybe Better coming in third place.

Field and barriers for the Melbourne Cup at Flemington on Tuesday 7 November after final declarations:

== Field ==
Victoria Derby winner Efficient pulled out of the Melbourne Cup lineup early on Tuesday morning with a knee injury, reducing the field to 23 runners. Efficient was aiming to become the first three-year-old since Skipton in 1941 to claim the Derby-Cup double. Efficient returned a year later and won the 2007 Melbourne Cup.

Tawqeet was inspected by veterinarians early Tuesday after concerns had been raised he may have injured his hoof after pulling the shoe on Monday afternoon.

Saddle cloth	Form	Horse	Trainer	Jockey	Weight	Barrier	Placing	Time
1	x112	Yeats	Aidan O'Brien (IRE)	Kieren Fallon	59 kg	4	7th	
2	30x3	Delta Blues (JPN)	K Sumii (JPN)	Yasunari Iwata	56 kg	10	1st	3:21.47
3	5800	Railings	John Hawkes	Darren Beadman	55.5 kg	2	12th	
4	5511	Tawqeet	David A. Hayes	Dwayne Dunn	55.5 kg	8	19th	
5	7424	Geordieland	Jamie Osborne (GB)	Frankie Dettori	54 kg	9	18th	
6	4607	Headturner	John Hawkes	Greg Childs	54 kg	18	13th	
7	3600	Short Pause	D Hayes	N Callow	53.5 kg	16	14th	
8	8324	Activation	Graeme Rogerson	Michael Rodd	53 kg	21	8th	
9	5160	Land 'N Stars	J Poulton (GB)	J Egan	53 kg	6	5th	
10	4960	Mahtoum	Kim Waugh	Corey Brown	53 kg	7	6th	
11	5056	On a Jeune	P Montgomerie	Darren Gauci	53 kg	14	20th	
12	11x7	Pop Rock	K Sumii (JPN)	Damien Oliver	53 kg	11	2nd	3:21.50
13	1501	Zipping	Graeme Rogerson	Glen Boss	52.5 kg	19	4th	3:22.43
14	6948	Dizelle	J Hawkes	Blake Shinn	52 kg	20	17th	
15	6400	Ice Chariot	R Maund	J Byrne	52 kg	1	22nd	
16	x924	Kerry O'Reilly	Jim Gibbs (NZ)	Cameron Lammas	52 kg	5	11th	
17	x220	Zabeat (NZ)	Donna Logan (NZ)	Oliver Doleuze	52 kg	15	23rd	
18	0045	Art Success	J Collins	A Pattillo	51.5 kg	12	16th	
19	7998	Demerger	Danny O'Brien	Stephen Baster	51 kg	22	21st	
20	2323	Glistening	Luca Cumani (GB)	Scott Seamer	51 kg	23	10th	
21	2151	Mandela	Richard Yuill (NZ)	Craig Williams	51 kg	13	9th	
22	0306	Dolphin Jo	T and K O'Sullivan	A Spiteri	50 kg	17	15th	
23	5811	Maybe Better	Brian Mayfield-Smith	Chris Munce	50 kg	3	3rd	3:22.18

== Video ==
- Race video on YouTube
