= Meisho Samson =

Japanese-bred racehorse (2003–2024)

Meisho Samson メイショウサムソン
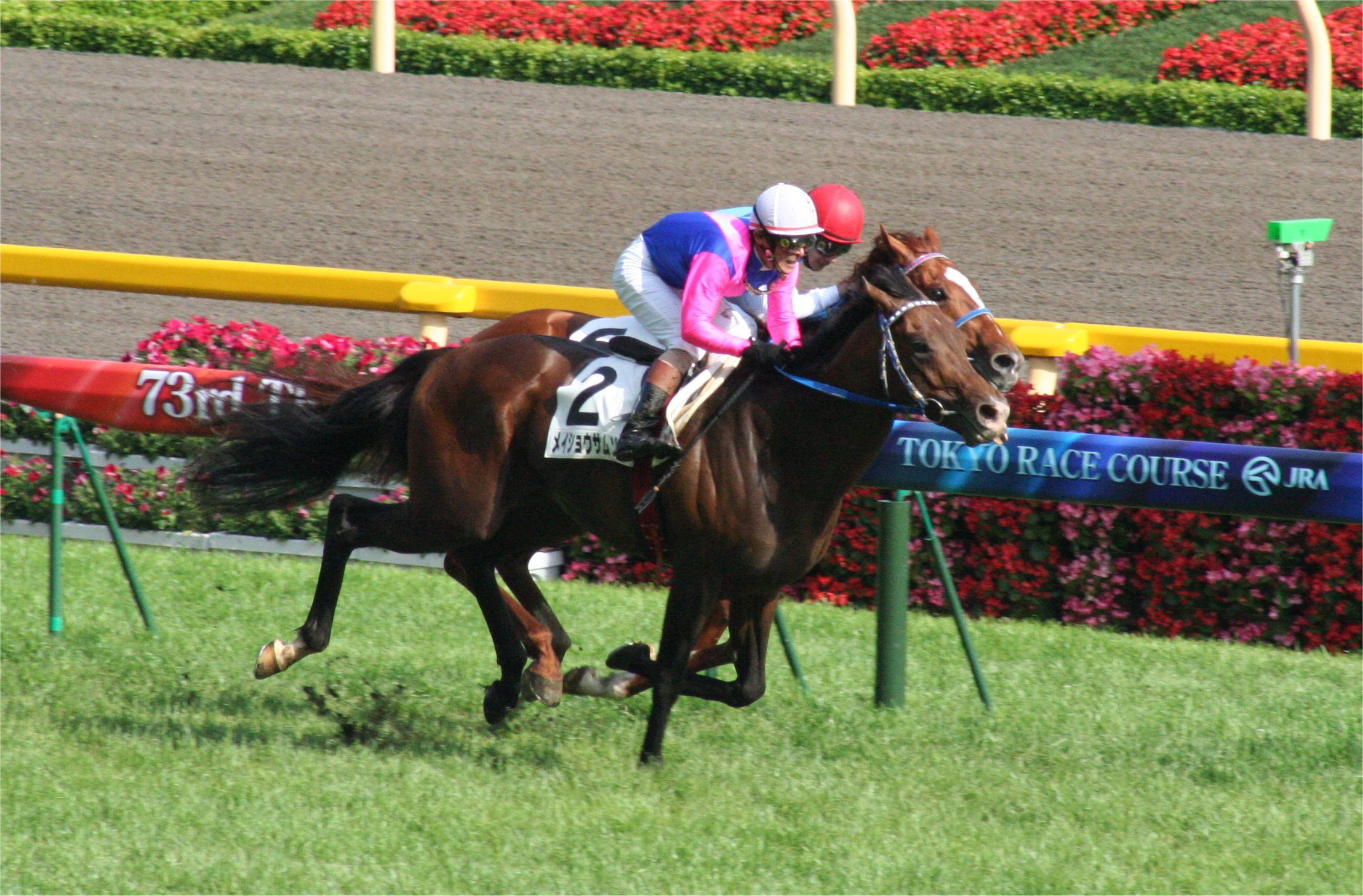
- Meisho Samson winning Tokyo Yūshun 2006
- Sire: Opera House
- Grandsire: Sadler's Wells
- Dam: My Vivien
- Damsire: Dancing Brave
- Sex: Stallion
- Foaled: 7 March 2003
- Died: 26 November 2024 (aged 21)
- Country: Japan
- Colour: Bay
- Breeder: Kouki Hayashi
- Owner: Yoshio Matsumoto
- Racing colours
- Trainer: Tsutomu Setoguchi →Shigetada Takahashi
- Jockey: Mamoru Ishibashi; Yutaka Take
- Record: 27: 9-7-2
- Earnings: 1,065,949,000 Yen

Major wins
- Spring Stakes (2006); Sankei Osaka Hai (2007); Tenno Sho (Spring) (2007); Tenno Sho (Autumn) (2007); Japanese Classic Race wins: Satsuki Sho (2006); Tokyo Yushun (2006)

Awards
- JRA Award for Best Three-Year-Old Colt (2006); JRA Special Award (2007)

Meisho Samson (Japanese: メイショウサムソン, Hepburn: Meishō Samuson; 7 March 2003 – 26 November 2024) was a Japanese racehorse and sire who won the Tokyo Yūshun and Satsuki Sho in 2006, and both the Tenno Sho (Spring) and Autumn in 2007. He became the first horse since T M Opera O in 2000 to snatch both Tenno Sho in the same season and the fourth overall after Tamamo Cross, Special Week and aforementioned T M Opera O.

Meisho Samson retired from racing after the 2008 season and became a stud.

He was diagnosed with cancer in late October 2024 and had been undergoing treatment, when he died of heart failure on the morning of November 26th. He was 21 years old.

== Background ==
Meisho Samson was foaled out of My Vivien, a mare with ten races starts. She was sired by Dancing Brave, a 2000 Guineas Stakes, King George VI & Queen Elizabeth Stakes and Prix de l'Arc de Triomphe winner in 1986. This horse itself shared the same sire as T M Opera O which would be Opera House, who won the King George VI and Queen Elizabeth Stakes and Coronation Cup in 1993.

His name came from the Yoshio stable crown name - Meisho and a person with the name that associated with superhuman strength - Samson.

== Racing career ==
=== 2005: two-year-old season ===
His first jockey would be Mamoru Ishibashi, who took the task after the fact that both Yuichi Fukunaga and Yutaka Take were unable to fulfill due to other duties. Meisho Samson started his career on a 1800 metres race at the Kokura Racecourse where he ended up in second place. He managed to get his first win at his third race and won the Nojigiku Stakes after that. The next race, he was beaten and finish in fourth place behind Fusaichi Richard who ran the race from wire-to-wire. Three weeks later, he participated at the Tokyo Sports Hai Nisai Stakes, which would be his first graded stakes race. He was on the front pack most of the race but losing again to Fusaichi Richard who used the same strategy for this one. He finished in second place by two and a half lengths behind. He closed the season with a win at the Chukyo Nisai Stakes where he pulled for the early lead and crossed the line first in a record time two lengths ahead of second-place finisher, Top of Tsuyoshi.

=== 2006: three-year-old season ===
Meisho Samson resumed his career by racing at the Kisaragi Sho in February. For this race, Meisho Samson had to chase down the leading pack but only managed to get second-place half a length behind the winner, Dream Passport. Ishibashi noted that this lost happen due to riding mistake as he went wide to avoid getting boxed in, which backfired him during the middle phase. He made amends on his next race at the Spring Stakes with Meisho Samson as they got off to a good start, took the lead easily, and was in the lead early at the fourth turn. Meisho Samson secured a good position smoothly on that tricky Nakayama course an overtook Dream Passport in the straight who had briefly pulled away from the inside. He managed to hold off Fusaichi Richard at the line, won the race by a neck margin and got his first graded stakes win.

This win convinced Ishibashi that this horse might just win the first classic race of the season, Satsuki Sho. When the race began, Ishibashi successfully positioned Meisho Samson to track the leaders, started to accelerate near the end to surpass Fusaichi Richard and held off Dream Passport to win the race by a half-length as a sixth favourite. This turned out to be Ishibashi's first Grade 1 race victory 22 years after his debut. The celebration for this victory was so immense as he and fellow jockey such as Yutaka Take himself went out for the drink until the next morning. One month after, Ishibashi and Meisho Samson aimed for the second classic at the Tokyo Yushun. He would started the race from inside which was the second gate, post one. When the gates opened, Meisho Samson ran smoothly after a good preparation beforehand. At the fourth corner, Ishibashi tightened up the rein and tracked the front pack which held by Admire Main and caught him on the final 100 metres. They leapfrogged him and although Ishibashi loosen out his grips near the end, he convinced they would not get passed at the line as they won the Yushun by a neck margin over Admire Main who ended finishing second. After the race, Ishibashi went down from the saddle, stood alone on the backstretch and looked up at the sky as a moment of gratitude for all his supporters along the way.

Instead of resting Meisho Samson to the pastures, he continued to train for the start of the autumn campaign. This decision was proven to be a mistake as Meisho Samson was stressed out mentally and his form was affected on this. At the Kobe Shimbun Hai, he secured a good lead from the start but surpassed by a late-surging Dream Passport. He finished in second place by a neck behind. For the final leg of the classic which was the Kikuka Sho, Meisho Samson started from the gate 12, post 6. Despite nailing a favourable gate, Ishibashi felt something wrong from him at the paddock on the race day. His instinct proved right as he was unable to accelerate well at the final straight and finished in fourth place, four and a quarter length behind the winner Song of Wind. He raced two more times for the year after failing his triple crown bid which would be in the Japan Cup and Arima Kinen. He finished outside the podium for both (sixth and fifth place respectively) behind Deep Impact. Due to winning two out of three triple crown races, Meisho Samson was awarded as the best three-year-old colt for the year by JRA.

=== 2007: four-year-old season ===
In the early of the season, Meisho Samson trainer switched from retiring Tsutomu Setoguchi to Shigetada Takahashi and he was sent to pastures after active competing for two season straight. In April, he started his career at the Sankei Osaka Hai. In the early phase, Meisho Samson tracked in the middle pack. He gradually advanced ahead of the field, drawing level with the second favorite, Shadow Gate who was leading in the middle of the straight and won by half a length in a long battle. This result encouraged Takahashi to put him in the Tenno Sho (Spring). He was drawn into gate 6 at post 3 which located at the middle of the starting gate. As a second favourite for the race, Meisho Samson sat at the midfield early on. Reaching 800 metres mark, two more favourites which are Delta Blues (ridden by Yasunari Iwata) moved ahead and Eye Popper (ridden by Katsumi Ando) moved outside whilst Ishibashi turned on the jets on Meisho Samson and spurting away to the lead from the pack. Meisho Samson stayed put at the lead and won the race by a nose over Erimo Expire. This win triggered an idea for an overseas career for Meisho Samson, in which he was registered for the Prix de l'Arc de Triomphe for this year. His back to back started earned him enough votes from the public to run in the Takarazuka Kinen. He accumulated 76,932 votes and sat at the first favourite for the race over horses like Daiwa Major, Sweep Tosho and Admire Moon. In the race, Meisho Samson ran well and even took a lead at the final 200 metres before losing the duel to the line against Admire Moon by a half-length and finishing in second-place.

There was a plan for him to going to France for the l'Arc as he would be ridden by Yutaka Take there. The plan was halted after Meisho Samson contacted with Equine Influenza and would travel back to Japan. Despite returning back to Japan, his jockey still would changed hand from Ishibashi to Take from now on. The plan being changed for his second half as he would be participated in the Tenno Sho (Autumn), Japan Cup and Arima Kinen. In the first one, the owner attempted him to win both Tenno Sho in one same season. He got a favourable gate for this one as he was drawn to start from gate 1, post 1. There was a rainfall before the race day but the track did went better and evaluated as good condition. When the race started, Meisho Samson matched up the average pace which set up by frontrunning Cosmo Bulk. As the field approached the turn, Cosmo Bulk moved out toward the middle of the track and allowed Take to bring Meisho Samson through to get a clear run down the straight in the best part of the track. There were some follow up after that but major interference carried out by Eishin Deputy, who raced at third position before the turn who slightly lost control and veered to left and right in the final straight, causing others to halt their spurt to avoid collision. Meisho Samson edged away on the inside of the track and Company made his way through the field to be second with 200 meters to go. Agnes Ark managed to come out of the interference in the early part of the straight, surpassed Company to finish in second two and half lengths behind the eventual winner, Meisho Samson. The aftermath of the interference was given out later as Eishin Deputy was deemed guilty and demoted to 14th place despite finishing eighth in the race. There were some unique record for this win for Meisho Samson and Yutaka Take personally:

- It was the fourth grade 1 win for Meisho Samson.
- It was the fourth Tenno Sho (Autumn) win for Yutaka Take since Super Creek (1989), Air Groove (1997) and Special Week (1999).
- Meisho Samson became the fourth horse to win both Tenno Sho in same season since Tamamo Cross (1988), Special Week (1999) and T M Opera O (2000).

His next race would be in the Japan Cup. In this race, he managed a good lead in early phase but had a fierce competition on the final straight and him, Pop Rock and Admire Moon crossed the line in a three-way photo finish. He ultimately finished a neck behind Pop Rock who finished a head behind the eventual winner, Admire Moon who ran in his retirement race. Take interacted about the lost and said that he maybe went too wide at the final stint of the race and the heavy odds really put some pressure for the horse to do well. At the season-ending race which was the Arima Kinen, Meisho Samson garnered 102,560 votes and enough to place him on second most favourite horse to win behind Vodka. Despite that highly favoured by the fans, both top two favourite failed to deliver on the day as Meisho Samson gassed out from fifth place in the middle race and ended up in eighth place whilst Vodka trailed back at 11th-place. At the end of the year, Meisho Samson was given a special award from JRA due to winning both Tenno Sho in a same season.

=== 2008: five-year-old season ===
Another attempt of overseas expedition was planned by Takahashi which were in Dubai Sheema Classic in Dubai or Queen Elizabeth II Cup in Sha Tin being proposed. These move never materialized and between those two, Meisho Samson raced in the Sankei Osaka Hai to prepare for the spring campaign. During the race, Meisho Samson secured a good position whilst racing in the fourth position but never able to increase his pace to chase the lead. In the end, he ended up in sixth place behind the winner, Daiwa Scarlet. Despite the poor result in that race, trainer Takahashi kept his positivity on the next appearances which would be the Tenno Sho (Spring) in May. His performance here turned out to be better as he made a nice inside charge towards the lead but was beaten by Admire Jupiter by a head. Admire Jupiter won this race started from the outside gate and botched his start. His closing race for the spring campaign would be the Takarazuka Kinen in which he started from the gate 2, post 2. The race went well but Eishin Deputy, who opted for early lead move despite the soft ground threw everyone off and he basically lead the whole way with at least one horse length. Meanwhile, Take urged Meisho Samson to move to the outside track for a better spurt to catch Eishin Deputy ahead but could not find it. They ended up in second place by a head margin.

For the second half of the season, it was decided that Meisho Samson would fly to France for the l'Arc campaign this year. He would stay on Take for this race. At the race day, Meisho Samson would start on the inner gate which was the gate 4. When the race started, Meisho Samson managed to stay in touch and positioned himself at sixth position for the majority. He stay on the inside near the straight but fallen out of the pack and failed to accelerate well. He ended up in tenth-place, six length behind the winner Zarkava. He returned to Japan and raced in the Japan Cup. This time, he was back with Ishibashi as Take was injured due to falling from the horse and fractured the shaft of his right ulna, making him unable to ride. On the race day, Meisho Samson competed for the lead at the final phase but unable to maintained and finished sixth. For his final race at the Arima Kinen, Take would return to jockey him for one last time. Along the race, Take rode Meisho Samson to track the runaway Daiwa Scarlet. This strategy did not work out as he slowed down as the race progressed and finished in eighth for his retirement race. On 4th January the next year, a retirement ceremony for him would be held. Both trainers (Setoguchi and Takahashi) and jockeys (Ishibashi and Take) described and poured their gratitude towards Meisho Samson as a great horse that achieved much such as winning both Tenno Sho and racing in France.

== Racing form ==
Meisho Samson won nine races and hit the podium nine more times out of 27 starts. This data is available based on JBIS, netkeiba and racingpost.

Date	Racecourse	Race	Grade	Distance (Condition)	Entry	HN	Odds (Favored)	Finish	Time	Margins	Jockey	Winner (Runner-up)
2005 – two-year-old season
Jul 31	Kokura	2yo Newcomer		1,800 m (Good)	12	4	14.0 (4)	2nd	1:53.5	0.0	Mamoru Ishibashi	Glorious Week
Aug 20	Kokura	2yo Maiden		1,800 m (Firm)	9	8	4.3 (2)	3rd	1:48.3	0.4	Mamoru Ishibashi	Eishin Chandler
Sep 4	Kokura	2yo Maiden		1,800 m (Firm)	14	10	2.2 (1)	1st	1:50.5	–0.4	Mamoru Ishibashi	(King Emperor)
Sep 18	Hanshin	Nojigiku Stakes	OP	1,600 m (Firm)	11	11	3.1 (1)	1st	1:36.0	–0.1	Mamoru Ishibashi	(Tagano Marshal)
Oct 29	Kyoto	Hagi Stakes	OP	1,800 m (Soft)	8	7	3.4 (2)	4th	1:50.0	0.9	Mamoru Ishibashi	Fusaichi Richard
Nov 19	Tokyo	Tokyo Sports Hai Nisai Stakes	3	1,800 m (Firm)	11	6	18.7 (5)	2nd	1:47.3	0.4	Mamoru Ishibashi	Fusaichi Richard
Dec 17	Chukyo	Chukyo Nisai Stakes	OP	1,800 m (Firm)	10	8	3.0 (2)	1st	R1:47.5	–0.3	Mamoru Ishibashi	(Top of Tsuyoshi)
2006 – three-year-old season
Feb 12	Kyoto	Kisaragi Sho	3	1,800 m (Firm)	12	7	3.4 (1)	2nd	1:47.5	0.1	Mamoru Ishibashi	Dream Passport
Mar 19	Nakayama	Spring Stakes	2	1,800 m (Firm)	16	16	14.5 (4)	1st	1:48.9	0.0	Mamoru Ishibashi	(Fusaichi Richard)
Apr 16	Nakayama	Satsuki Sho	1	2,000 m (Firm)	18	5	14.5 (6)	1st	1:59.9	–0.1	Mamoru Ishibashi	(Dream Passport)
May 28	Tokyo	Tokyo Yushun	1	2,400 m (Good)	18	2	3.8 (1)	1st	2:27.9	–0.1	Mamoru Ishibashi	(Admire Main)
Sep 24	Chukyo	Kobe Shimbun Hai	2	2,000 m (Firm)	16	2	1.6 (1)	2nd	1:58.1	0.1	Mamoru Ishibashi	Dream Passport
Oct 22	Kyoto	Kikuka Sho	1	3,000 m (Firm)	18	12	2.0 (1)	4th	3:03.4	0.7	Mamoru Ishibashi	Song of Wind
Nov 26	Tokyo	Japan Cup	1	2,400 m (Firm)	11	11	16.0 (4)	6th	2:25.9	0.8	Mamoru Ishibashi	Deep Impact
Dec 24	Nakayama	Arima Kinen	1	2,500 m (Firm)	14	8	21.4 (4)	5th	2:32.7	0.8	Mamoru Ishibashi	Deep Impact
2007 – four-year-old season
Apr 1	Hanshin	Sankei Osaka Hai	2	2,000 m (Firm)	11	3	1.9 (1)	1st	2:01.4	–0.1	Mamoru Ishibashi	(Shadow Gate)
Apr 29	Kyoto	Tenno Sho (Spring)	1	3,200 m (Firm)	16	6	4.5 (2)	1st	3:14.1	0.0	Mamoru Ishibashi	(Erimo Expire)
Jun 24	Hanshin	Takarazuka Kinen	1	2,200 m (Good)	18	17	4.2 (2)	2nd	2:12.5	0.1	Mamoru Ishibashi	Admire Moon
Oct 28	Tokyo	Tenno Sho (Autumn)	1	2,000 m (Good)	16	1	2.9 (1)	1st	1:58.4	–0.4	Yutaka Take	(Agnes Ark)
Nov 25	Tokyo	Japan Cup	1	2,400 m (Firm)	18	10	1.8 (1)	3rd	2:24.7	0.0	Yutaka Take	Admire Moon
Dec 23	Nakayama	Arima Kinen	1	2,500 m (Good)	15	1	2.4 (1)	8th	2:35.2	1.6	Yutaka Take	Matsurida Gogh
2008 – five-year-old season
Apr 6	Hanshin	Sankei Osaka Hai	2	2,000 m (Firm)	11	7	3.0 (2)	6th	1:59.2	0.5	Yutaka Take	Daiwa Scarlet
May 4	Kyoto	Tenno Sho (Spring)	1	3,200 m (Firm)	14	8	4.8 (2)	2nd	3:15.1	0.0	Yutaka Take	Admire Jupiter
Jun 29	Hanshin	Takarazuka Kinen	1	2,200 m (Soft)	14	2	2.1 (1)	2nd	2:15.3	0.0	Yutaka Take	Eishin Deputy
Oct 5	Longchamp	Prix de l'Arc de Triomphe	1	2,400 m (Soft)	16	5	25/1 (8)	10th	2:30.0	1.2	Yutaka Take	Zarkava
Nov 30	Tokyo	Japan Cup	1	2,400 m (Firm)	17	2	6.5 (3)	6th	2:26.0	0.5	Mamoru Ishibashi	Screen Hero
Dec 28	Nakayama	Arima Kinen	1	2,500 m (Firm)	14	9	8.4 (4)	8th	2:32.5	1.0	Yutaka Take	Daiwa Scarlet

Legend:
Turf

- R indicated that it was a record time finish

== Stud career ==
Meisho Samson's descendants include:

c = colt, f = filly

Foaled	Name	Sex	Major Wins
2010	Samson's Pride	f	Principal Stakes
2011	Luminous Warrior	c	Hakodate Kinen
2013	Kinsho Yukihime	c	Fukushima Himba Stakes
2013	Frontier Queen	c	Laurel R. C. Sho, Nakayama Himba Stakes
2013	Denko Ange	c	Fukushima Himba Stakes

== Pedigree ==
Pedigree of Meisho Samson
Sire *Opera House 1988	Sadler's Wells; 1981	Northern Dancer	Nearctic
Sire *Opera House 1988	Sadler's Wells; 1981	Northern Dancer	Natalma
Sire *Opera House 1988	Sadler's Wells; 1981	Fairy Bridge	Bold Reason
Sire *Opera House 1988	Sadler's Wells; 1981	Fairy Bridge	Special
Sire *Opera House 1988	Colorspin; 1983	High Top	Derring-Do
Sire *Opera House 1988	Colorspin; 1983	High Top	Camenae
Sire *Opera House 1988	Colorspin; 1983	Reprocolor	Jimmy Reppin
Sire *Opera House 1988	Colorspin; 1983	Reprocolor	Blue Queen
Dam My Vivien 1997	Dancing Brave; 1983	Lyphard	Northern Dancer
Dam My Vivien 1997	Dancing Brave; 1983	Lyphard	Goofed
Dam My Vivien 1997	Dancing Brave; 1983	Navajo Princess	Drone
Dam My Vivien 1997	Dancing Brave; 1983	Navajo Princess	Olmac
Dam My Vivien 1997	Will Princess; 1983	Sun Prince	Princely Gift
Dam My Vivien 1997	Will Princess; 1983	Sun Prince	Costa Sola
Dam My Vivien 1997	Will Princess; 1983	Yell	Fortino
Dam My Vivien 1997	Will Princess; 1983	Yell	Garnet (family 3)
