= Pop Rock (horse) =

Japanese-bred Thoroughbred racehorse

Pop Rock ポップロック
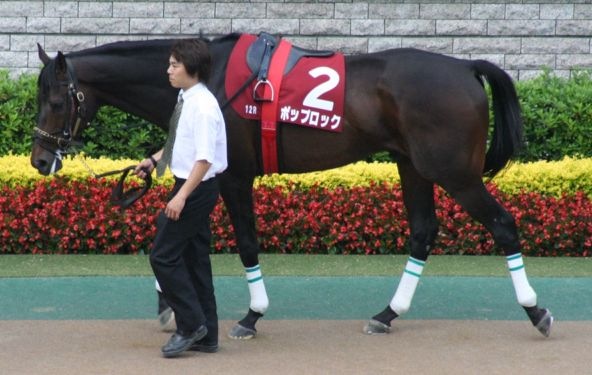
- Pop Rock at Tokyo Racecourse on May 27, 2007
- Breed: Thoroughbred
- Sire: Helissio
- Grandsire: Fairy King
- Dam: Pops
- Damsire: Sunday Silence
- Sex: Stallion
- Foaled: March 19, 2001
- Died: 26 June 2025 (aged 24)
- Country: Japan
- Colour: Bay
- Breeder: Northern Farm
- Owner: Katsumi Yoshida
- Racing colours
- Trainer: Katsuhiko Sumii; Takashi Kodama
- Jockey: Olivier Peslier; Yuga Kawada; Yutaka Take
- Record: 40: 8-5-9
- Earnings: 511,186,000 JPY +A$825,000 +USD1,000,000 + €16,590

Major wins
- Meguro Kinen (2006, 2007)
- Last updated on April 6, 2026

Pop Rock (Japanese: ポップロック, Hepburn: Poppu Rokku; March 19, 2001 – June 26, 2025) was a Japanese racehorse and breeding stallion trained by Katsuhiko Sumii. Pop Rock is best known for having placed second in the 2006 Melbourne Cup, ridden by Damien Oliver. By the time the race was run, Pop Rock had effectively become joint favourite. It was Oliver's 17th time racing in the Melbourne Cup.

On his next start, he managed to get the closest to Deep Impact (who won the Japanese Triple Crown in 2005 and the Japan Cup in 2006) in the 2006 Group 1 Arima Kinen and was beaten to second by Admire Moon in the 2007 Japan Cup.

In 2010 Pop Rock was sold to new owners and was trained in Ireland by Takashi Kodama. He won on his European debut at Galway Racecourse in July 2010. His final race was the Irish St. Leger but he trailed the field and was then retired to stud.

== Racing career ==
=== Early careers (2003–2005) ===
Pop Rock made his debut on the 2000 metres races at Hanshin Racecourse, where he won the race by half a length over Tamamo Yamato. Then he was winless for the next six races where his best finishes was third place in four races. He managed to score his second win at the Kakitsubata Sho in 2004, winning over Silk Trigger by a neck after surging from the back at the third corner. Then his winless streak continues with three times finishing in third place. His best result in the graded race so far is only in eighth place at the St. Lite Kinen.

=== Popping on form, Australian journey and back to back Meguro Kinen title (2006–2007) ===
In 2006, Pop Rock won his first race after three third-place finish streak in a 2200 metres races at the Hanshin Racecourse. He stayed on the front pack mostly at the top four position before bursting to the front on fourth corner to win the race by five lengths over Sakura Kingdom. From this race, he continued to win two races after which were Shirasagi Tokubetsu and Shirakawa Tokubetsu before running in the Meguro Kinen, his first G2 races since that St. Lite Kinen in 2004. In this race with a heavy track, he was tracking mostly in the middle of the pack before accelerating at the end and win the race against the 2nd favourite, Eye Popper by a neck. This great form encouraged an excursion journey for the horse in Australia. His first race there was the Caulfield Cup. In this race, he started slowly and roamed in the middle field but failed to gain any improvement throughout the races. He finished in seventh-place in the end, one and a quarter length behind the winner, Tawqeet. The next venture would be the Melbourne Cup. He was the first favourite of the race at 5/1 odds alongside Tawqeet. When the race began, Pop Rock positioned himself in 12th before surging up to ninth position when approaching the straight. Then, he accelerated towards the outside of track and had a final duel for last 100 yards with fellow compatriot, Delta Blues. He finished second at the line just by a shoulder against Delta Blues. This was a one-two finishes from Japanese horse and the third time that the race was won by a foreign horse. After the race, he would returned to Japan and participated in the Arima Kinen. For this race, Pop Rock was not favoured as much by the voters as he only managed to accumulate 13,380 votes, enough for the 20th-place in the standings. Despite that, he ran a great race under Olivier Peslier and finished in second place, three lengths behind Deep Impact.

Pop Rock started his 2007 season by racing in the Kyoto Kinen 17 February. On this day, Pop Rock tried to chase Admire Moon as he made he final spurt right after the fourth corner but failed. Pop Rock ended up finishing in second place by a neck. This is his third straight second place finish in three races. The owner sent him on another expedition which would be in United Arab Emirates this time around. He would ran in the Dubai Sheema Classic next. This time, he was never in contention from the start as he settled on the rear pack and failed to challenge for the lead. He ended up in sixth-place, three and a quarter length behind the winner, Vengeance of Rain. He returned back to Japan and ran in the race he won the previous year which was the Meguro Kinen. This time ridden by Yutaka Take, Pop Rock made a breakaway from the inside track at the final straight and held off Coconut Punch at the line to win by a neck. He joined the Takarazuka Kinen next when he became the tenth most voted horse at 28,866 votes from the public. He ended up in third place behind the winner Admire Moon and Meisho Samson. For the autumn campaign, there were plans by the trainer, Sumii to send both him and Delta Blues back for a second going in the Melbourne Cup. This plan was scrapped as the equine influenza was hitting both horses during their resting time. He returned on the Kyoto Daishoten where he lost the duel against Inti Raimi at the final homestretch and finished in second place by a neck. Next, he started at the Tenno Sho (Autumn). He finished fourth for this race. Peslier who returned on his saddle explained that he tried to maneuver Pop Rock into a good position but a barge of horses came from the outside prevented it. Pop Rock tried to extend more than he could but the distance just not enough. For the next race in the Japan Cup, the competition would be at its peak. From the final stretch, Pop Rock, Meisho Samson, Admire Moon and Vodka rallied for the win with Vodka fading out before the line and the other three hit the line in three-way photo finish. Pop Rock ended up in second place again behind Admire Moon by a head. He finished the season with a run at the Arima Kinen for the second successive year. In this year with full of upset finishes without top-3 favourite on the podium, Pop Rock who was the 2nd favourite finished fifth, five lengths behind the winner Matsurida Gogh.

=== Final podium, decline in form, moving to Ireland and retirement (2008–2010) ===
Instead of going on another Dubai trip, Pop Rock started the season at the Hanshin Daishoten in March. For this race, Pop Rock tracked mostly on the front group but failed to rally for the lead and finished in third place, two and half lengths behind Admire Jupiter and a neck behind second place, Eye Popper. This race turned out to be his final good performance in Japan as he missed the podium for his next eight start from 2008 until 2010. He was sent out to Takashi Kodama stable in Ireland as a move to revive his career again in which his JRA registration would be terminated. He did well under Fran Berry when he won his debut Guinness Races at the Galway Racecourse by two and half lengths over Caesar's Song. Then, he ran in the Irish St. Leger next. This race was disastrous for Pop Rock as Berry slowed him down on the final straight due to discomfort for the horse as he finished last in the race, 49 lengths behind the winner. The post race examination found that Pop Rock developed superficial digital flexor tendonitis in his right foreleg, and it was decided that he would retire from racing and going to stud.

== Racing form ==
Pop Rock would win eight races and hit the podium 13 times (with three second places finish in G1 races) out of 40 starts. This data is available based on JBIS, netkeiba, racingpost and Horse Racing Ireland.

Date	Racecourse	Race	Grade	Distance (Condition)	Entry	HN	Odds (Favored)	Finish	Time	Margins	Jockey	Winner (Runner-up)
2003 – two-year-old season
Sep 14	Hanshin	2yo Newcomer		2,000 m (Firm)	9	2	3.7 (2)	1st	2:04.7	–0.1	Katsumi Ando	(Tamamo Yamato)
Nov 29	Kyoto	Kyoto Nisai Stakes	OP	2,000 m (Heavy)	8	3	11.6 (5)	4th	2:07.4	0.6	Richard Hughes	Mystic Age
Dec 20	Chukyo	Chukyo Nisai Stakes	OP	1,700 m (Sloppy)	15	1	4.7 (3)	3rd	1:46.9	0.3	Richard Hughes	Black Condor
2004 – three-year-old season
Jan 24	Kyoto	Wakagoma Stakes	OP	2,000 m (Firm)	10	9	9.9 (3)	3rd	2:03.1	0.6	Yasunari Iwata	Black Tide
Mar 13	Hanshin	Yukiyanagi Sho	ALW (1W)	2,200 m (Firm)	13	1	3.2 (2)	6th	2:15.1	0.3	Yasunari Iwata	Stratagem
Apr 4	Hanshin	3yo Allowance	1W	2,500 m (Good)	11	8	5.0 (3)	3rd	2:38.2	0.3	Katsumi Ando	Cosmo Stage
Apr 24	Kyoto	Moonee Valley Racing Club Sho	ALW (1W)	2,400 m (Firm)	10	9	2.1 (1)	3rd	2:28.3	0.3	Katsumi Ando	Chikiri Sansan
May 29	Chukyo	Kakitsubata Sho	ALW (1W)	2,500 m (Firm)	11	9	3.4 (2)	1st	2:34.5	0.0	Katsumi Ando	(Silk Trigger)
Aug 21	Sapporo	Shikotsuko Tokubetsu	ALW (2W)	2,600 m (Soft)	11	8	10.4 (6)	6th	2:46.6	1.0	Masayoshi Ebina	Meisho Kachidoki
Sep 19	Nakayama	St. Lite Kinen	2	2,200 m (Firm)	15	7	37.2 (7)	8th	2:11.2	1.1	Hirofumi Shii	Cosmo Bulk
Oct 9	Kyoto	Narutaki Tokubetsu	ALW (2W)	2,400 m (Good)	9	6	9.9 (5)	9th	2:32.1	5.1	Koshiro Take	T M Generous
2005 – four-year-old season
Sep 25	Hanshin	3yo+ Allowance	1W	2,500 m (Firm)	13	4	8.8 (5)	3rd	2:35.1	0.6	Hirofumi Shii	Mayano Liberty
Oct 16	Kyoto	3yo+ Allowance	1W	2,400 m (Firm)	15	7	3.1 (1)	3rd	2:27.4	0.2	Norihiro Yokoyama	Bayreuth
2006 – five-year-old season
Jan 21	Kokura	4yo+ Allowance	1W	2,400 m (Fast)	15	10	3.9 (2)	3rd	2:38.4	1.0	Marco Monteriso	Fumino Blue Sky
Apr 9	Hanshin	4yo+ Allowance	1W	2,200 m (Firm)	16	12	6.0 (3)	1st	2:15.4	–0.8	Hirofumi Shii	(Sakura Kingdom)
Apr 16	Hanshin	Shirasagi Tokubetsu	ALW (2W)	2,500 m (Good)	12	11	2.4 (1)	1st	2:35.9	–0.2	Yuga Kawada	(Machikaneumajirusi)
May 13	Kyoto	Shirakawa Tokubetsu	ALW (2W)	2,400 m (Heavy)	12	1	2.4 (1)	1st	2:30.5	–1.0	Yasunari Iwata	(Battle Brave)
May 28	Tokyo	Meguro Kinen	2	2,500 m (Good)	17	7	6.7 (3)	1st	2:33.1	0.0	Yuga Kawada	(Eye Popper)
Oct 21	Caulfield	Caulfield Cup	1	2,400 m (Good)	18	11	12/1 (5)	7th	2:28.0	0.3	Damien Oliver	Tawqeet
Nov 7	Flemington	Melbourne Cup	1	3,200 m (Good)	24	12	5/1 (1)	2nd	3:21.5	0.0	Damien Oliver	Delta Blues
Dec 24	Nakayama	Arima Kinen	1	2,500 m (Firm)	14	1	31.1 (6)	2nd	2:32.4	0.5	Olivier Peslier	Deep Impact
2007 – six-year-old season
Feb 17	Kyoto	Kyoto Kinen	2	2,200 m (Good)	14	3	2.2 (1)	2nd	2:17.2	0.0	Olivier Peslier	Admire Moon
Mar 31	Nad Al Sheba	Dubai Sheema Classic	1	2,400 m (Good)	14	10	9/2 (2)	6th	2:31.6	0.6	Olivier Peslier	Vengeance of Rain
May 27	Tokyo	Meguro Kinen	2	2,500 m (Firm)	18	2	2.9 (1)	1st	2:31.4	0.0	Yutaka Take	(Coconut Punch)
Jun 24	Hanshin	Takarazuka Kinen	1	2,200 m (Good)	18	5	6.9 (4)	3rd	2:12.8	0.4	Yutaka Take	Admire Moon
Oct 7	Kyoto	Kyoto Daishoten	2	2,400 m (Firm)	10	3	2.1 (1)	2nd	2:24.8	0.0	Hirofumi Shii	Inti Raimi
Oct 28	Tokyo	Tenno Sho (Autumn)	1	2,000 m (Good)	16	15	6.1 (4)	4th	1:59.0	0.6	Olivier Peslier	Meisho Samson
Nov 25	Tokyo	Japan Cup	1	2,400 m (Firm)	18	2	10.5 (4)	2nd	2:24.7	0.0	Olivier Peslier	Admire Moon
Dec 23	Nakayama	Arima Kinen	1	2,500 m (Good)	15	6	5.0 (2)	5th	2:34.5	0.9	Olivier Peslier	Matsurida Gogh
2008 – seven-year-old season
Mar 28	Hanshin	Hanshin Daishoten	2	3,000 m (Firm)	13	3	1.9 (1)	3rd	3:09.2	0.5	Yutaka Take	Admire Jupiter
May 4	Kyoto	Tenno Sho (Spring)	1	3,200 m (Firm)	14	10	8.4 (4)	12th	3:17.4	2.3	Hiroyuki Uchida	Admire Jupiter
Oct 12	Kyoto	Kyoto Daishoten	2	2,400 m (Firm)	10	1	7.3 (3)	7th	2:27.2	0.3	Hiroyuki Uchida	Toho Alan
Nov 2	Tokyo	Tenno Sho (Autumn)	1	2,000 m (Firm)	17	8	4.1 (9)	14th	1:58.3	1.1	Hiroyuki Uchida	Vodka
2009 – eight-year-old season
May 3	Kyoto	Tenno Sho (Spring)	1	3,200 m (Firm)	18	7	89.4 (16)	8th	3:15.2	0.8	Yuga Kawada	Meiner Kitz
May 31	Tokyo	Meguro Kinen	2	2,500 m (Heavy)	18	8	19.1 (6)	11th	2:42.0	3.0	Yuga Kawada	Miyabi Ranveli
Dec 5	Nakayama	Stayers Stakes	2	3,600 m (Good)	16	6	14.2 (6)	14th	3:52.7	1.4	Mirco Demuro	Forgettable
2010 – nine-year-old season
Jan 5	Kyoto	Manyo Stakes	OP	3,000 m (Firm)	13	5	17.5 (7)	5th	3:07.4	0.6	Yasunari Iwata	Tokai Trick
Feb 14	Tokyo	Diamond Stakes	3	3,400 m (Firm)	15	12	51.4 (9)	11th	3:33.6	1.0	Katsuharu Tanaka	Forgettable
Jul 30	Galway	Guinness Race		14 f (Firm)	11	12	9/2 (5)	1st	3:10.2	0.5	Fran Berry	(Caesar's Song)
Sep 11	Curragh	Irish St. Leger	1	14 f (Firm)	8	2	9/11 (4)	8th	3:20.1	9.8	Fran Berry	Sans Frontieres

Legend:
Turf Dirt

== Stud record and death ==
When he retired, he became a stud at Napajedla stud in the Czech Republic. His two most noteworthy progenies were Kalypso of Gracie, a 2014 Slovak two-year-old colt champion and Golden Devil, who finished third in the Czech St. Leger. He continued to be a stud until he died on 26 June 2025 at age 24.

== Pedigree ==
Pedigree of Pop Rock
Sire Helissio	Fairy King	Northern Dancer	Nearctic
Sire Helissio	Fairy King	Northern Dancer	Natalma
Sire Helissio	Fairy King	Fairy Bridge	Bold Reason
Sire Helissio	Fairy King	Fairy Bridge	Special
Sire Helissio	Helice	Slewpy	Seattle Slew
Sire Helissio	Helice	Slewpy	Rare Bouquet
Sire Helissio	Helice	Hirondelle	Val de l'Orne
Sire Helissio	Helice	Hirondelle	Hermanville
Dam Pops	Sunday Silence	Halo	Hail to Reason
Dam Pops	Sunday Silence	Halo	Cosmah
Dam Pops	Sunday Silence	Wishing Well	Understanding
Dam Pops	Sunday Silence	Wishing Well	Mountain Flower
Dam Pops	Pop Singer	Secretariat	Bold Ruler
Dam Pops	Pop Singer	Secretariat	Somethingroyal
Dam Pops	Pop Singer	Icy Pop	Icecapade
Dam Pops	Pop Singer	Icy Pop	Calaki (F-No. 7-c)
