= Coongy Cup =

Horse race held in Melbourne, Australia

Coongy Cup registered as the Coongy Handicap
- Class: Group 3
- Location: Caulfield Racecourse, Melbourne, Australia
- Inaugurated: 1898
- Race type: Thoroughbred – Flat racing
- Sponsor: Sportsbet (2024-26)

Race information
- Distance: 2,000 metres
- Surface: Turf
- Track: Left-handed
- Qualification: Maidens ineligible
- Weight: Handicap
- Purse: $240,000 (2026)

The Coongy Cup, registered as the Coongy Handicap, is a Melbourne Racing Club Group 3 Thoroughbred horse race held under open handicap conditions, for horses aged three years old and upwards, over a distance of 2000 metres, held at Caulfield Racecourse, Melbourne, Australia in October.

== History ==
The race is run on the second day of the MRC Spring Carnival (Caulfield Cup day) and the winner is exempt from ballot in the Caulfield Cup which is run on the third day. Between 1998 and 2018 the race was run on the Caulfield Cup day of the MRC Spring Carnival. During World War II the race was run at Flemington Racecourse.

=== Distance ===
- 1898–1930 – 1 3/8 miles (~2200 metres)
- 1931–1937 – the race was not held
- 1938–1940 – 1 1/4 miles (~2000 metres)
- 1941 – 1 1/2 miles (~2400 metres)
- 1942–1946 – the race was not held
- 1947–1967 – 1 1/2 miles (~2400 metres)
- 1968–1972 – 1 1/4 miles (~2000 metres)
- 1973–1996 – 2000 metres
- 1997–1998 – 2100 metres
- 1999–2002 onwards – 2000 metres
- 2003 – 2020 metres
- 2004 onwards – 2000 metres

=== Grade ===
- 1898–1977 – Principal race
- 1978 onwards – Group 3

=== Name ===
- 1898–2007 – Coongy Handicap
- 2008–2015 – David Jones Cup
- 2016 onwards - Coongy Cup

=== Venue ===
The race was run at Sandown Park Racecourse in 1997 and 1998 on a Sunday.

== Winners ==
The following are past winners of the race.

- 2026 - Ziryab
- 2025 - Wootton Verni
- 2024 - Kingswood
- 2023 - Muramasa
- 2022 - Gunstock
- 2021 - Duais
- 2020 - Nonconformist
- 2019 - Wolfe
- 2018 - † Best Of Days / Mask Of Time
- 2017 - Kiwia
- 2016 - Vanbrugh
- 2015 - Stratum Star
- 2014 - Contributor
- 2013 – Spurtonic
- 2012 – Lighinthenite
- 2011 – Foreteller
- 2010 – Ginga Dude
- 2009 – Baughurst
- 2008 – Baughurst
- 2007 – Fire In The Night
- 2006 – Maybe Better
- 2005 – Activation
- 2004 – Reclaim
- 2003 – Frightening
- 2002 – Mr.Lofty
- 2001 – Citra's Prince
- 2000 – Typhoon
- 1999 – Oliver Twist
- 1998 – It's All In Fun
- 1997 – Our Sumo
- 1996 – Circles Of Gold
- 1995 – Macdrury
- 1994 – Excited Angel
- 1993 – Silk Ali
- 1992 – Fraar
- 1991 – Mantlepiece
- 1990 – Kessem
- 1989 – Eye Of The Sky
- 1988 – Ideal Centreman
- 1987 – King Of Brooklyn
- 1986 – Periscope
- 1985 – Under Oath
- 1984 – Lancelotto
- 1983 – La Cocotte
- 1982 – Rose Of Kingston
- 1981 – Our Paddy Boy
- 1980 – Yashmak
- 1979 – Sonstone
- 1978 – La Mer
- 1977 – Major Till
- 1976 – Northbridge Lad
- 1975 – Shiftmar
- 1974 – Bellota
- 1973 – Top Role
- 1972 – Jan's Beau
- 1971 – Igloo
- 1970 – Lancelot
- 1969 – Tails
- 1968 – Pealatial
- 1967 – Midlander
- 1966 – Fulmen
- 1965 – Dalento
- 1964 – Bon Filou
- 1963 – Battle Standard
- 1962 – Blue Shaun
- 1961 – Grand Print
- 1960 – Westdale
- 1959 – Contador
- 1958 – Red Pine
- 1957 – Ralkon
- 1956 – Thaumus
- 1955 – Ribera
- 1954 – †Sunish / Te Totara
- 1953 – Winemaker
- 1952 – Durham
- 1951 – True Course
- 1950 – Vantage
- 1949 – Hoyle
- 1948 – Britisher
- 1947 – Red Fury
- 1942–46 – race not held
- 1941 – Son Of Aurous
- 1940 – †Lanarus / Morvren
- 1939 – Historian
- 1938 – Kingdom
- 1931–37 – race not held
- 1930 – Shadow King
- 1929 – Prince Viol
- 1928 – Textile
- 1927 – Bunkie
- 1926 – Naos
- 1925 – Valwyne
- 1924 – Graculus
- 1923 – Stare
- 1922 – Paratoo
- 1921 – Stare
- 1920 – Ulster
- 1919 – Kunegetis
- 1918 – Camp Out
- 1917 – King's Bounty
- 1916 – Torbane
- 1915 – Cock O' The North
- 1914 – Sylvanmore
- 1913 – Effervescence
- 1912 – Artesian
- 1911 – Didus
- 1910 – Eye Glass
- 1909 – Dhobi
- 1908 – Welcome Trist
- 1907 – Apologue
- 1906 – Demas
- 1905 – Scot Free
- 1904 – Sylvan King
- 1903 – Elderslie
- 1902 – Vanity Fair
- 1901 – Juggler
- 1900 – Clean Sweep
- 1899 – Dewey
- 1898 – Hymettus

† Dead heat

== See also ==
- List of Australian Group races
- Group races
