= Meguro Kinen =

Meguro Kinen 目黒記念
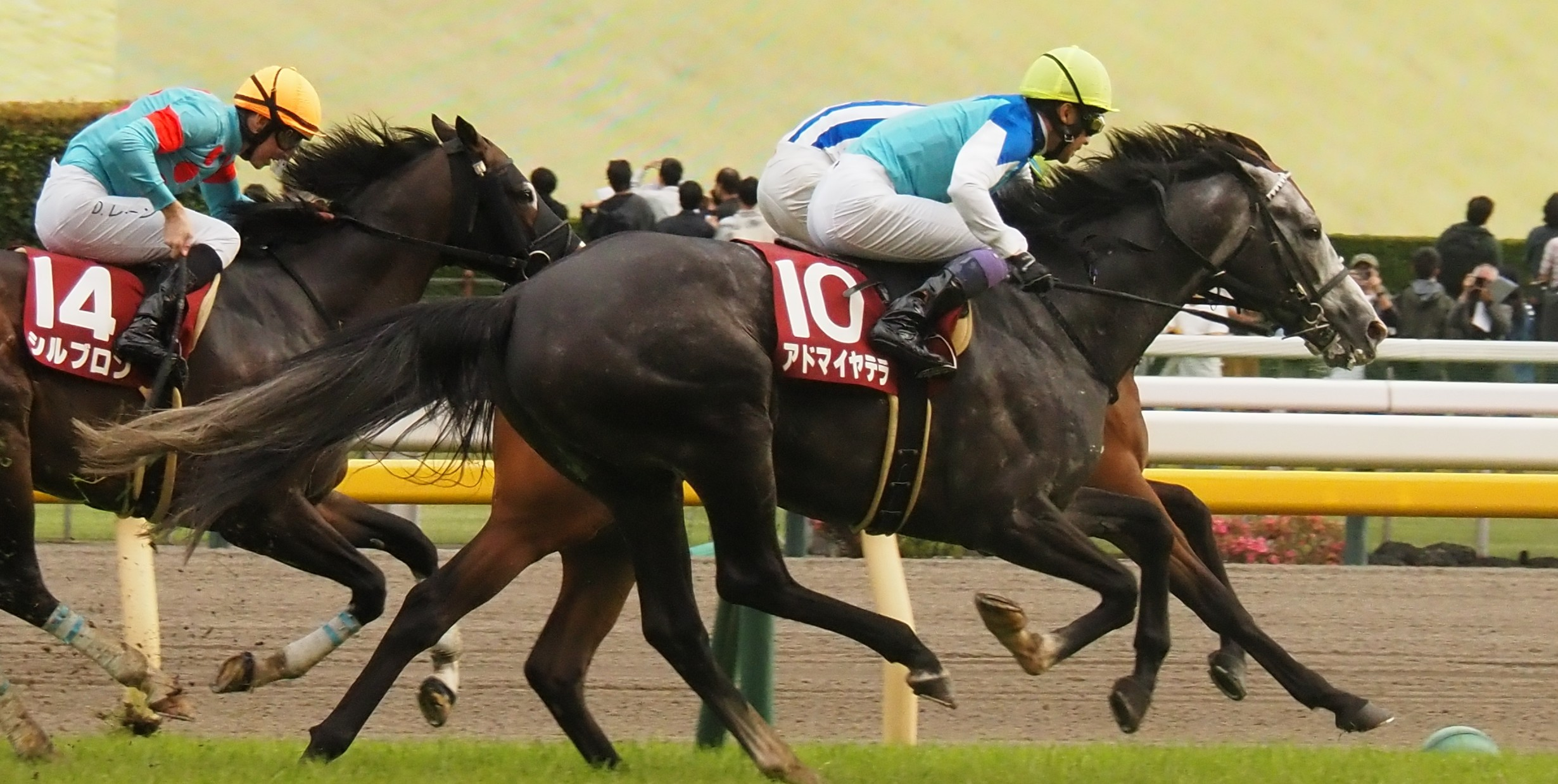
- Admire Terra winning the 2025 Meguro Kinen
- Class: Grade 2
- Location: Tokyo Racecourse
- Inaugurated: 1932
- Race type: Thoroughbred Flat racing

Race information
- Distance: 2500 metres
- Surface: Turf
- Track: Left-handed
- Qualification: 4-y-o +
- Weight: Handicap
- Purse: ¥ 123,120,000 (as of 2026): 1st: ¥ 57,000,000; 2nd: ¥ 23,000,000; 3rd: ¥ 14,000,000

The Meguro Kinen (Japanese 目黒記念) is a Grade 2 handicap horse race in Japan for Thoroughbreds aged at least four years old, run in May over a distance of 2,500 metres at Tokyo Racecourse.

It was first run in 1932 over 3400 metres at Meguro Racecourse and was later run over 3900 metres and 3200 metres before being run over its current distance for the first time in 1952. The race was elevated to Grade 2 class in 1984. Although the race moved to Tokyo Racecourse when Meguro Racecourse closed in 1934 the race retained the name of its original venue.

== Winners since 2000 ==
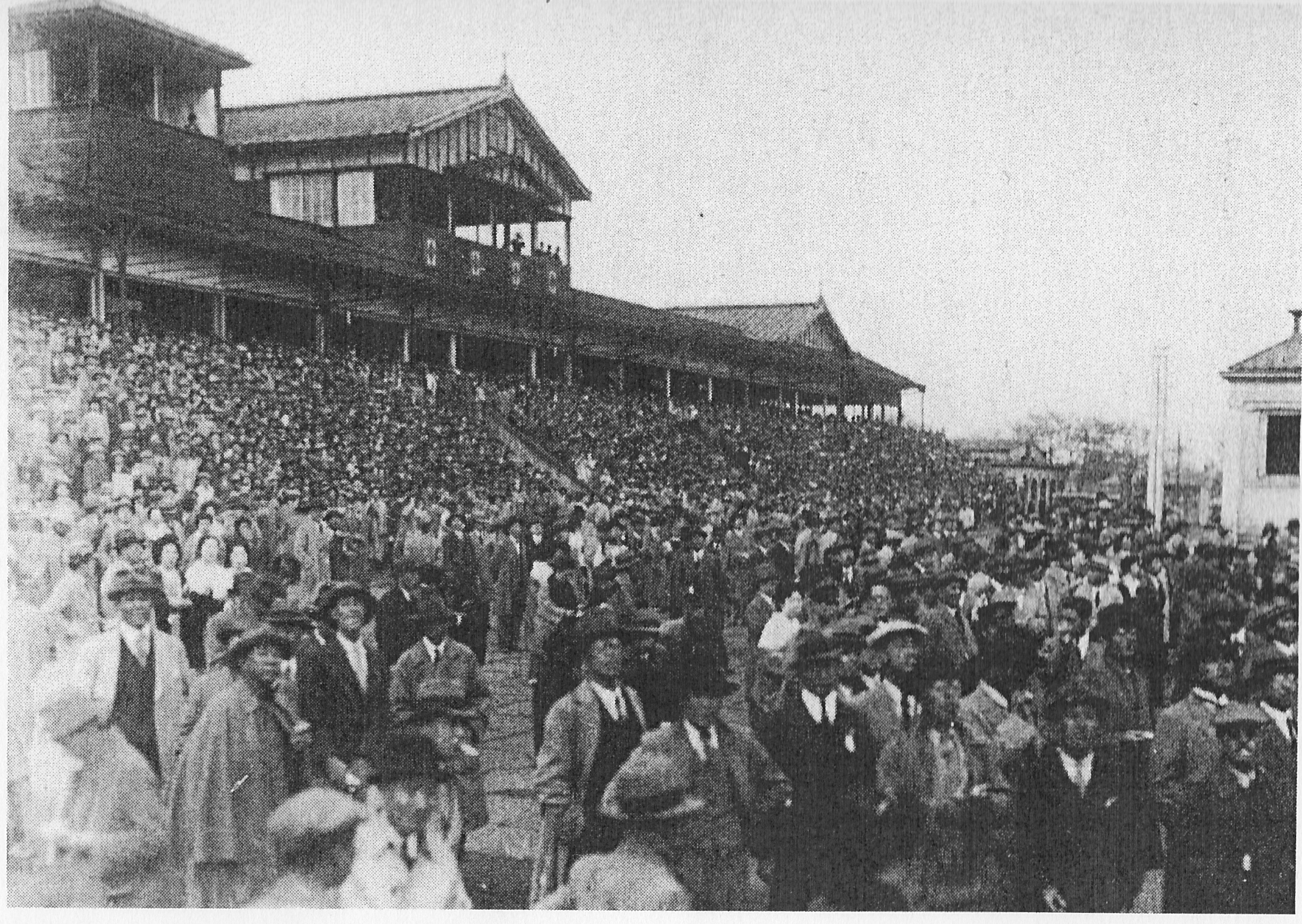
Meguro Racecourse in 1933

Year	Winner	Age	Jockey	Trainer	Owner	Time
2000	Stay Gold	6	Yutaka Take	Yasuo Ikee	Shadai Race Horse	2:33.2
2001	Hot Secret	5	Yoshitomi Shibata	Yoshiyuki Goto	Makoto Kaneko	2:30.8
2002	Toshi the V	6	Hiroshi Kawachi	Hidetaka Otonashi	Kanae Kamimura	2.31.8
2003	Toshi the V	7	Yoshitomi Shibata	Hidetaka Otonashi	Kanae Kamimura	2.31.2
2004	Chakra	4	Yoshitomi Shibata	Akio Adachi	Eiko Tadokoro	2:30.5
2005	Opera City	4	Tetsuzo Sato	Shozo Sasaki	Yushun Horse Club	2:29.8
2006	Pop Rock	5	Yuga Kawada	Katsuhiko Sumii	Katsumi Yoshida	2:33.1
2007	Pop Rock	6	Yutaka Take	Katsuhiko Sumii	Katsumi Yoshida	2:31.4
2008	Hokuto Sultan	4	Norihiro Yokoyama	Yasushi Shono	Sugako Fuse	2:31.9
2009	Miyabi Ranveli	6	Yuichi Kitamura	Keijo Kato	Yoshikatsu Murakami	2:39.0
2010	Copano Jingu	5	Kenichi Ikezoe	Toru Miya	Sachiaki Kobayashi	2:34.8
2011	King Top Gun	8	Norihiro Yokoyama	Ippo Sameshima	Toyoji Ikeda	2:32.5
2012	Smart Robin	4	Masayoshi Ebina	Kunehide Matsuda	Toru Okawa	2:30.6
2013	Mousquetaire	5	Hiroyuki Uchida	Yasuo Tomomichi	Katsumi Yoshida	2:29.6
2014	Meiner Medalist	6	Masayoshi Ebina	Kiyotaka Tanaka	Thoroughbred Club Ruffian	2:31.0
2015	Hit The Target	7	Futoshi Komaki	Keijo Kato	Shinji Maeda	2:29.7
2016	Cryptogram	4	Yuichi Fukunaga	Hideaki Fujiwara	Carrot Farm	2:30:6
2017	Fame Game	7	Christophe Lemaire	Yoshitada Munakata	Sunday Racing	2:30.9
2018	Win Tenderness	5	Hiroyuki Uchida	Haruki Sugiyama	Win	2:29.7
2019	Look Twice	6	Damian Lane	Hideaki Fujiwara	Tomokazu Iizuka	2:28.2
2020	King of Koji	4	Norihiro Yokoyama	Shogo Yasuda	Kazuhiro Masuda	2:29.6
2021	Win Kiitos	4	Yuji Tannai	Yoshitada Munakata	Win	2:32.8
2022	Boccherini	6	Suguru Hamanaka	Yasutoshi Ikee	Kaneko Makoto Holdings	2:32.1
2023	Heat on Beat	6	Damian Lane	Yasuo Tomomichi	Shadai Race Horse	2:30.8
2024	Struve	5	João Moreira	Noriyuki Hori	Katsuko Muraki	2:32.3
2025	Admire Terra	4	Yutaka Take	Yasuo Tomomichi	Junko Kondo	2:32.9
2026	Feiern Kranz	4	Damian Lane	Noriyuki Hori	Sunday Racing	2:29.8

== Earlier winners ==
- 1932 - Hakuryu
- 1933 - Ascott
- 1934 - Taiho
- 1935 - Denkou
- 1936 - Miss Akira
- 1937 - Tokumasa
- 1938 - Azumadake
- 1939 - Hen'un
- 1940 - Espalion
- 1941 - Taka Homare
- 1942 - Rockford
- 1943 - Oakmont
- 1944 - no race
- 1945 - no race
- 1946 - no race
- 1947 - Asahi Fuji
- 1948 - Mitsukaze
- 1949 - Sefutesu
- 1950 - Rockholt
- 1951 - Hatakaze
- 1952 - Mitsuhata
- 1953 - Takahata
- 1954 - Kuri Chikara
- 1955 - Hakuryo
- 1956 - Selfie
- 1957 - Haku Chikara
- 1958 - Tametomo
- 1959 - Kuripero
- 1960 - Sweet One
- 1961 - Yashima First
- 1962 - Caesar
- 1963 - Asariyu
- 1964 - Harbor Hikari
- 1965 - Burutaka Chiho
- 1966 - Daini Tenran
- 1967 - Speed Symboli
- 1968 - Die Parade
- 1969 - Speed Symboli
- 1970 - Continental
- 1971 - Mejiro Musashi
- 1972 - Josetsu
- 1973 - Onward Guy
- 1974 - Hirokuni
- 1975 - Colonel Symboli
- 1976 - Hakuba Taro
- 1977 - Kashu Chikara
- 1978 - Kashu Chikara
- 1979 - Sakura Shouri
- 1980 - Kane Minobu
- 1981 - Kitano Rikio
- 1982 - Kamino Violet
- 1983 - Tosho God
- 1984 - Dai Sekitai
- 1985 - Mr Le Mans
- 1986 - Bingo Timur
- 1987 - Mount Nizon
- 1988 - Mejiro Fulmar
- 1989 - Kiri Power
- 1990 - Marutaka Tyson
- 1991 - Carib Song
- 1992 - Yamanin Global
- 1993 - Matikanetannhauser
- 1994 - Narita Taishin
- 1995 - Hagino Real King
- 1996 - Yu Sensho
- 1997 - Agnes Kamikaze
- 1998 - Going Suzuka
- 1999 - Rosen Kavalier

== See also ==
- Horse racing in Japan
- List of Japanese flat horse races
