= Matsurida Gogh =

Japanese thoroughbred racehorse

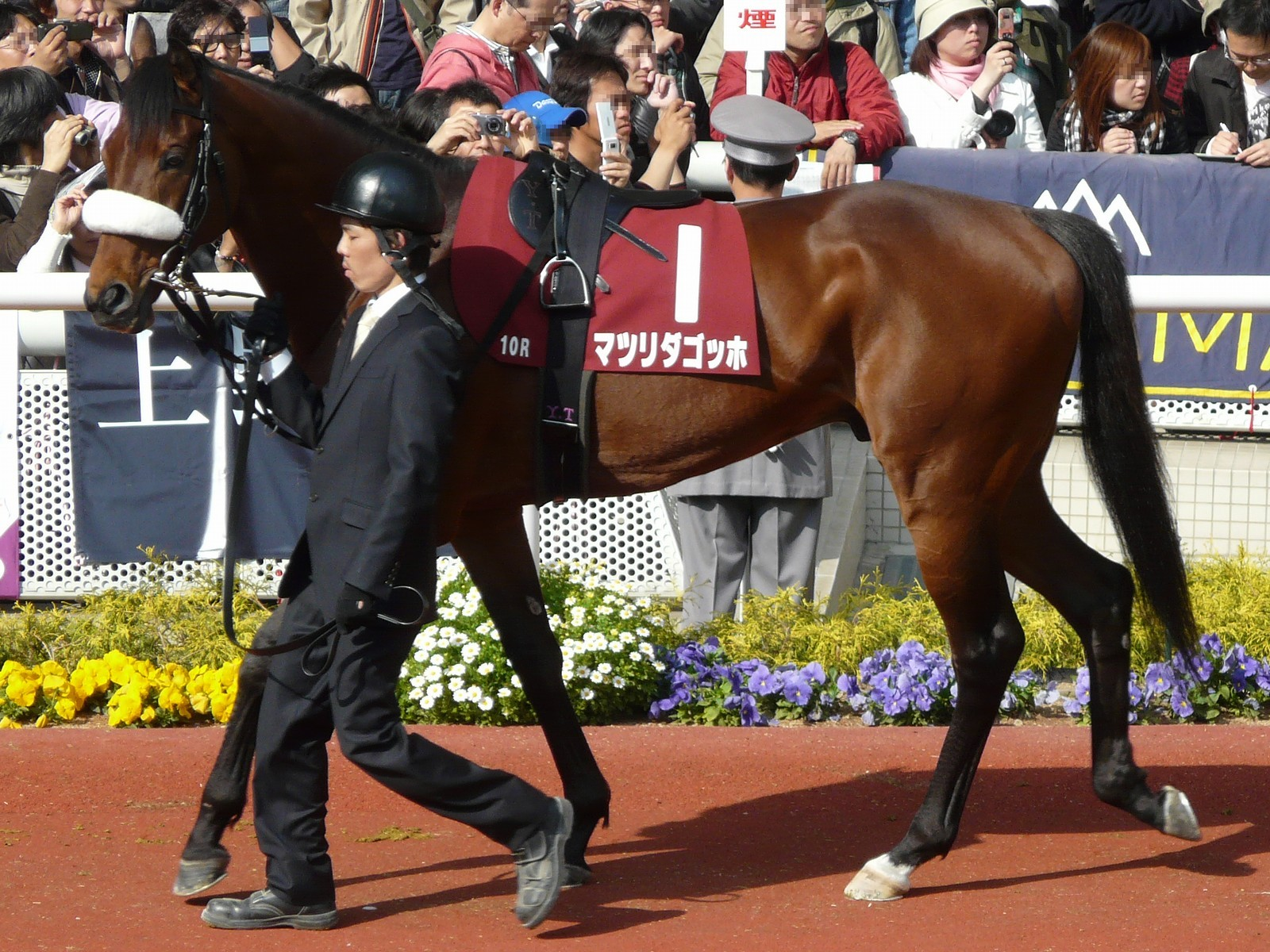
- Matsurida Gogh in 2009
- Sire: Sunday Silence
- Grandsire: Halo
- Dam: Paper Rain
- Damsire: Bel Bolide
- Sex: Stallion
- Foaled: March 15, 2003
- Country: Japan
- Colour: Bay
- Breeder: Okada Stud
- Owner: Fumie Takahashi
- Racing colours
- Trainer: Sakae Kunieda
- Jockey: Masayoshi Ebina
- Record: 27: 10-2-1
- Earnings: $6,032,224

Major wins
- American Jockey Club Cup (2007); Sankei Sho All Comers (2007, 2008, 2009); Arima Kinen (2007); Nikkei Sho (2008)

Matsurida Gogh (foaled March 15, 2003) is a Japanese Thoroughbred racehorse and the winner of the 2007 Arima Kinen. He was also known for winning Sankei Sho All Comers three times in a row from 2007 until 2009. Other races that he won were the American Jockey Club Cup and Nikkei Sho. He was nicknamed Nakayama's expert, as he won all his graded stakes there, and eight out of his ten career wins happened at Nakayama.

== Background ==
Matsurida Gogh was foaled out of Paper Rain, who was a half-sibling to the 1999 Kikuka Sho winner, Narita Top Road. He was sired by the prominent sire in Japan for 13 consecutive seasons, Sunday Silence.

His name was a combination of Fumie Takahashi stable's crown name - Matsurida and Gogh which was taken from the famous Dutch artist, Vincent van Gogh.

== Racing career ==
Matsurida Gogh's first race was on August 21, 2005, at Sapporo, where he came in first by seven lengths.

The next year, his second victory came in his fourth race where he waited at the back of the pack for most of the race before making a sudden move before the third turn, taking the lead at the start of the straight and winning convincingly by two and a half lengths over Kanetoshi Steve. Three races later, he won the Hidaka Tokubetsu on August 19, 2006, and then won the Christmas Cup on December 23, 2006, to close the year.

He won the American Jockey Club Cup on January 21, 2007 with another dominant five lengths margin victory. and placed third behind Never Bouchon at the Nikkei Sho. Then he experienced a slump in form before taking the first Sankei Sho All Comers win on September 23, 2007. On December 23, he would run in the biggest race of his career which would be the Arima Kinen. For this race, he gained 19,172 votes from the public which placed him 19th in the rank. Since Admire Moon was retired at the Japan Cup, Agnes Ark was having a fracture after the Mile Championship and Asahi Rising got rested, Matsurida Gogh was eligible to run in the field of 16 in this Arima Kinen. Despite being the ninth favourite. Matsurida Gogh had a great race when he managed to tracked the front runner, Daiwa Scarlet in the early phase. At the final corner, Daiwa Scarlet moved to the outside whilst Matsurida Gogh went to the inside. It was a drag race to the finish line in which the final outcome was that Matsurida Gogh crossed the line first, one and a quarter lengths in front of Daiwa Scarlet, for his first ever G1 race victory.

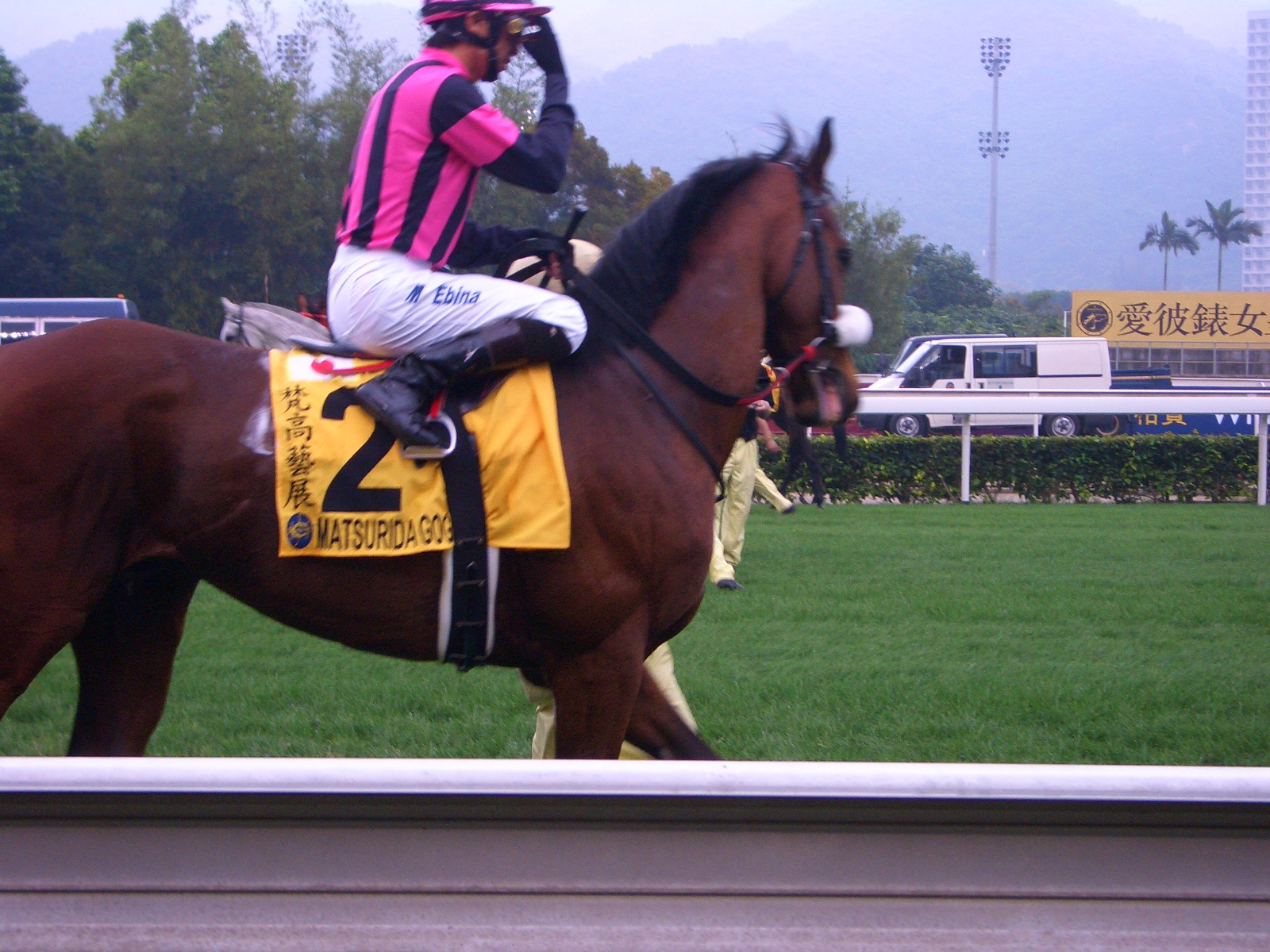
Matsurida Gogh at the Queen Elizabeth II Cup

The next year, He then won the Nikkei Sho on March 29, 2008. He went to the Queen Elizabeth II Cup at Sha Tin in April in which he finished at sixth place, four lengths behind the winner Archipenko. He returned to Japan and placed second at the Sapporo Kinen where Tascata Sorte overtook him at the last minute of the race. Then, He won the Sankei Sho All Comers for a second time on September 28 where he drew alongside King's Trail before reaching the finish line first.

At the next four race reaching the 2009 calendar year, Matsurida placed outside of the podium before he proceeded to win the Sankei Sho All Comers for a 3rd time on September 27. In this race, Matsurida Gogh got off to a good start, took the lead, maintained his pace in the straight and winning by two lengths over the 1st favorite, Dream Journey who chased from the middle of the pack. His final race was on December 27, 2009, when he finished in 7th place at the Arima Kinen. After the race, he was being retired as a racehorse and moved on as a stud at Rex Stud in Shinhidaka, Hokkaido.

== Racing form ==
Matsurida Gogh won ten races, placed second twice and third once out of 27 starts. This data is available based on JBIS, netkeiba and Hong Kong Jockey Club.

Date	Racecourse	Race	Grade	Distance (Condition)	Entry	HN	Odds (Favored)	Finish	Time	Margins	Jockey	Winner (Runner-up)
2005 – two-year-old season
Aug 21	Sapporo	2yo Newcomer		1,800 m (Firm)	13	7	4.1 (3)	1st	1:52.8	–1.1	Masayoshi Ebina	(Sun Fiber)
Oct 1	Sapporo	Sapporo Nisai Stakes	3	1,800 m (Firm)	13	11	3.6 (2)	6th	1:51.2	0.8	Masayoshi Ebina	Admire Moon
2006 – three-year-old season
Mar 12	Nakayama	3yo Allowance	1W	1,800 m (Firm)	13	3	4.0 (2)	1st	1:50.1	–0.1	Yasunari Iwata	(Ferrari Five)
Apr 29	Tokyo	Aoba Sho	2	2,400 m (Firm)	17	2	4.5 (2)	4th	2:26.4	1.1	Masayoshi Ebina	Admire Main
May 27	Chukyo	Shirayuri Stakes	OP	1,800 m (Firm)	16	2	3.4 (2)	7th	1:48.0	0.4	Yasunari Iwata	M S World
Aug 19	Sapporo	Hidaka Tokubetsu	ALW (2W)	2,000 m (Firm)	13	9	2.9 (1)	1st	2:01.4	–0.2	Norihiro Yokoyama	(Elea City)
Sep 17	Nakayama	St. Lite Kinen	2	2,200 m (Firm)	17	11	6.2 (3)	DNF	–	–	Masayoshi Ebina	Tosen Shana O
Dec 10	Nakayama	Toji Stakes	ALW (3W)	2,000 m (Firm)	12	9	2.3 (1)	2nd	2:00.2	0.0	Norihiro Yokoyama	Fate Tricks
Dec 23	Nakayama	Christmas Cup	ALW (3W)	1,800 m (Firm)	14	8	2.7 (1)	1st	1:46.9	–0.1	Norihiro Yokoyama	(Nihonpillow Keith)
2007 – four-year-old season
Jan 21	Nakayama	American Jockey Club Cup	2	2,200 m (Firm)	10	5	3.2 (2)	1st	2:12.8	–0.8	Norihiro Yokoyama	(Intelleto)
Mar 24	Nakayama	Nikkei Sho	2	2,500 m (Firm)	14	5	2.4 (1)	3rd	2:32.0	0.2	Norihiro Yokoyama	Never Bouchon
Apr 29	Kyoto	Tenno Sho (Spring)	1	3,200 m (Firm)	16	1	9.6 (5)	11th	3:15.1	1.0	Norihiro Yokoyama	Meisho Samson
Sep 2	Sapporo	Sapporo Kinen	2	2,000 m (Firm)	16	13	4.2 (1)	7th	2:00.6	0.5	Katsumi Ando	Fusaichi Pandora
Sep 23	Nakayama	Sankei Sho All Comers	2	2,200 m (Firm)	16	6	2.3 (1)	1st	2:12.5	–0.1	Masayoshi Ebina	(Silk Nexus)
Oct 28	Tokyo	Tenno Sho (Autumn)	1	2,000 m (Good)	16	16	32.4 (8)	15th	2:00.1	1.7	Masayoshi Ebina	Meisho Samson
Dec 23	Nakayama	Arima Kinen	1	2,500 m (Good)	15	3	52.3 (9)	1st	2:33.6	–0.2	Masayoshi Ebina	(Daiwa Scarlet)
2008 – five-year-old season
Mar 29	Nakayama	Nikkei Sho	2	2,500 m (Firm)	13	9	2.3 (1)	1st	2:32.7	–0.5	Masayoshi Ebina	(Tosho Knight)
Apr 27	Sha Tin	Queen Elizabeth II Cup	1	2,000 m (Good)	11	6	5.7 (3)	6th	2:01.4	0.7	Masayoshi Ebina	Archipenko
Aug 24	Sapporo	Sapporo Kinen	2	2,000 m (Firm)	11	4	2.3 (1)	2nd	1:58.6	0.0	Masayoshi Ebina	Tascata Sorte
Sep 28	Nakayama	Sankei Sho All Comers	2	2,200 m (Firm)	14	11	1.4 (1)	1st	2:12.0	–0.3	Masayoshi Ebina	(King's Trail)
Nov 30	Tokyo	Japan Cup	1	2,400 m (Firm)	17	13	8.0 (5)	4th	2:25.7	0.2	Masayoshi Ebina	Screen Hero
Dec 28	Nakayama	Arima Kinen	1	2,500 m (Firm)	14	10	4.4 (2)	12th	2:33.1	1.6	Masayoshi Ebina	Daiwa Scarlet
2009 – six-year-old season
Apr 5	Hanshin	Sankei Osaka Hai	2	2,000 m (Firm)	12	1	6.2 (2)	7th	2:00.4	0.7	Yutaka Take	Dream Journey
Aug 23	Sapporo	Sapporo Kinen	2	2,000 m (Firm)	16	14	6.9 (2)	9th	2:01.3	0.6	Norihiro Yokoyama	Yamanin Kingly
Sep 27	Nakayama	Sankei Sho All Comers	2	2,200 m (Firm)	15	15	4.6 (3)	1st	2:11.4	–0.3	Norihiro Yokoyama	(Dream Journey)
Nov 1	Tokyo	Tenno Sho (Autumn)	1	2,000 m (Firm)	18	13	33.2 (8)	17th	1:58.9	1.7	Masayoshi Ebina	Company
Dec 27	Nakayama	Arima Kinen	1	2,500 m (Firm)	16	7	9.4 (3)	7th	2:31.9	1.9	Masayoshi Ebina	Dream Journey

Legend:
Turf

== Stud career ==
Matsurida Gogh became a stud at the Rex stud in Shinhidaka, Hokkaido. Throughout his career as a stud from 2010 until 2023, He had bred with 982 mares, produced 587 foals, registered 572 foals with total earnings of 4,929,687,000 ¥ and AEI of 0.71. He retired as a stud in 2023 and would spend the rest of his years at his birthplace, Okada stud.

=== Major winners ===
c = colt, f = filly

Grade winners
Foaled	Name	Sex	Major Wins
2011	Win Malerei	c	Radio Nikkei Sho
2012	Cool Hotarubi	c	Fantasy Stakes
2013	Lord Quest	c	Niigata Nisai Stakes, Keisei Hai Autumn Handicap, Swan Stakes
2013	Meiner Honey	c	Challenge Cup
2018	Ringoame	f	Hakodate Nisai Stakes

== Pedigree ==
Pedigree of Matsurida Gogh (JPN), 2003
Sire Sunday Silence (USA) 1986	Halo (USA); 1969	Hail to Reason	Turn-to
Sire Sunday Silence (USA) 1986	Halo (USA); 1969	Hail to Reason	Nothirdchance
Sire Sunday Silence (USA) 1986	Halo (USA); 1969	Cosmah	Cosmic Bomb
Sire Sunday Silence (USA) 1986	Halo (USA); 1969	Cosmah	Almahmoud
Sire Sunday Silence (USA) 1986	Wishing Well (USA); 1975	Understanding	Promised Land
Sire Sunday Silence (USA) 1986	Wishing Well (USA); 1975	Understanding	Pretty Ways
Sire Sunday Silence (USA) 1986	Wishing Well (USA); 1975	Mountain Flower	Montparnasse
Sire Sunday Silence (USA) 1986	Wishing Well (USA); 1975	Mountain Flower	Edelweiss
Dam Paper Rain (USA) 1991	Bel Bolide (USA); 1978	Bold Bidder	Bold Ruler
Dam Paper Rain (USA) 1991	Bel Bolide (USA); 1978	Bold Bidder	High Bid
Dam Paper Rain (USA) 1991	Bel Bolide (USA); 1978	Lady Graustark	Graustark
Dam Paper Rain (USA) 1991	Bel Bolide (USA); 1978	Lady Graustark	Inyala
Dam Paper Rain (USA) 1991	Floral Magic (USA); 1985	Affirmed	Exclusive Native
Dam Paper Rain (USA) 1991	Floral Magic (USA); 1985	Affirmed	Wont Tell You
Dam Paper Rain (USA) 1991	Floral Magic (USA); 1985	Rare Lady	Never Bend
Dam Paper Rain (USA) 1991	Floral Magic (USA); 1985	Rare Lady	Double Agent
