= Katsuhiko Sumii =

Japanese horse trainer (born 1964)

Katsuhiko Sumii 角居勝彦
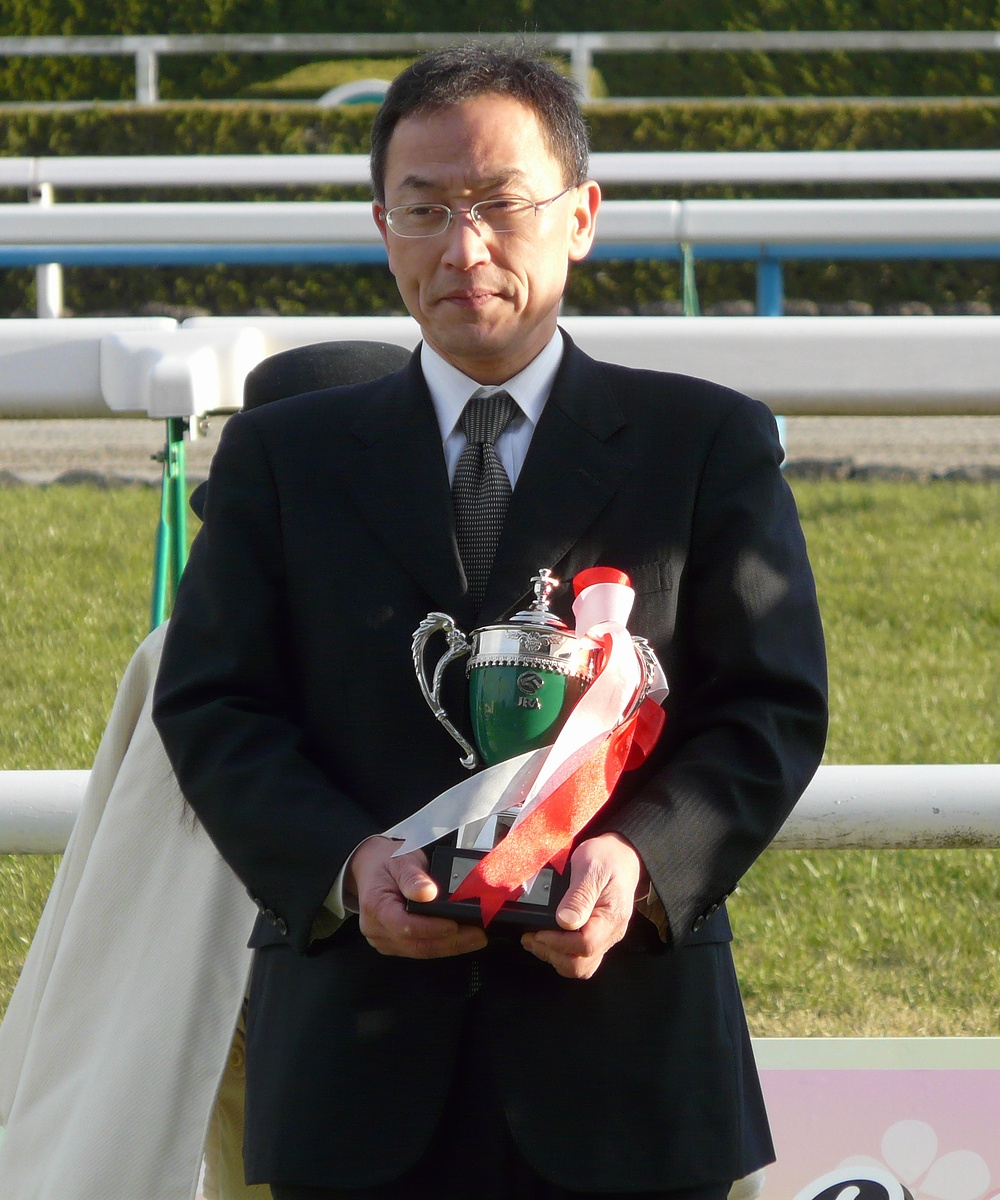

Personal information
- Nationality: Japanese
- Born: 28 March 1964 (age 62) Kanazawa, Ishikawa Prefecture, Japan
- Occupation: Trainer (Retired)

Horse racing career
- Sport: Horse racing
- Career wins: 793

Racing awards
- JRA Award for Best Trainer (races won) (2011-13); JRA Award for Best Trainer (money earned) (2005, 2008, 2010, 2013, 2014); JRA Award for Best trainer (training technique) (2014)

Katsuhiko Sumii (角居 勝彦, Sumii Katsuhiko) (born 28 March 1964, Kanazawa, Ishikawa) is a Japanese retired trainer of Thoroughbred race horses. He trained the first and second placing horses in the 2006 Melbourne Cup, Delta Blues and Pop Rock. Other notable horses Sumii has trained include Kane Hekili, Vodka, Victoire Pisa, and Epiphaneia.

Sumii retired in February 2021 to succeed his mother's work as an active member of the Tenrikyo.

== Major wins ==
Japan

- Kikuka Sho (Japanese St. Legers) - (3) - Delta Blues (2004), Epiphaneia (2013), Kiseki (2017)
- Yushun Himba - (2) - Cesario (2005), Tall Poppy (2008)
- Japan Dirt Derby - (2) - Kane Hekili (2005), Friendship (2006)
- Derby Grand Prix - (1) - Kane Hekili (2005)
- Mile Championship - (1) - Hat Trick (2005)
- Japan Cup Dirt - (2) - Kane Hekili (2005, 2008)
- February Stakes - (1) - Kane Hekili (2006)
- Teio Sho - (1) - Kane Hekili (2006)
- Hanshin Juvenile Fillies - (2) - Vodka (2006), Tall Poppy (2007)
- Tokyo Yushun (Japanese Derby) - (2) - Vodka (2007), Roger Barows (2019)
- Yasuda Kinen - (2) - Vodka (2008, 2009)
- Tenno Sho (Autumn) - (1) - Vodka (2008)
- Tokyo Daishōten - (1) - Kane Hekili (2008)
- Kawasaki Kinen - (1) - Kane Hekili (2009)
- Victoria Mile - (1) - Vodka (2009)
- Japan Cup - (2) - Vodka (2009), Epiphaneia (2014)
- Satsuki Sho - (2) - Victoire Pisa (2010), Saturnalia (2019)
- Arima Kinen - (1) - Victoire Pisa (2010)
- Shuka Sho - (1) - Aventura (2011)
- Japan Breeding farm's Cup Ladies' Classic - (1) - Sambista (2014)
- Queen Elizabeth II Cup - Lachesis (2014)
- Champion's Cup - (1) - Sambista (2014)
- Asahi Hai Futurity Stakes - Leontes (2015)
- Kashiwa Kinen (1) - Wide Pharaoh (2020)

United States of America

- American Oaks - (1) - Cesario (2005)

Hong Kong

- Hong Kong Mile - (1) - Hat Trick (2005)
- Queen Elizabeth II Cup - (1) - Rulership (2012)

United Arab Emirates

- Dubai World Cup - (1) - Victoire Pisa (2011)

Australia

- Melbourne Cup - (1) - Delta Blues (2006)
