= Maybe Better =

Australian-bred Thoroughbred racehorse

- Sire: Intergaze (AUS)
- Grandsire: Integra (AUS)
- Dam: Amarula (AUS)
- Damsire: Rubiton (AUS)
- Sex: Gelding
- Foaled: 12 August 2002
- Country: Australia
- Colour: Bay
- Breeder: J Horvat
- Owner: J Horvat, B Da Silva Jorge
- Trainer: Brian Mayfield-Smith
- Record: 29:6-3-2
- Earnings: $959,600

Major wins
- Coongy Cup (2006); Saab Quality (2006)

Maybe Better (foaled 12 August 2002) is an Australian Thoroughbred racehorse who won the 2006 Group 3 Saab Quality and finished 3rd in the 2006 Melbourne Cup when ridden by Chris Munce. Maybe Better started in 29 races placing for six wins, three 2nds and two 3rds, with earnings of A$959,600.
