= Admire Moon =

Japanese-bred Thoroughbred racehorse (2003–2026)

Admire Moon アドマイヤムーン
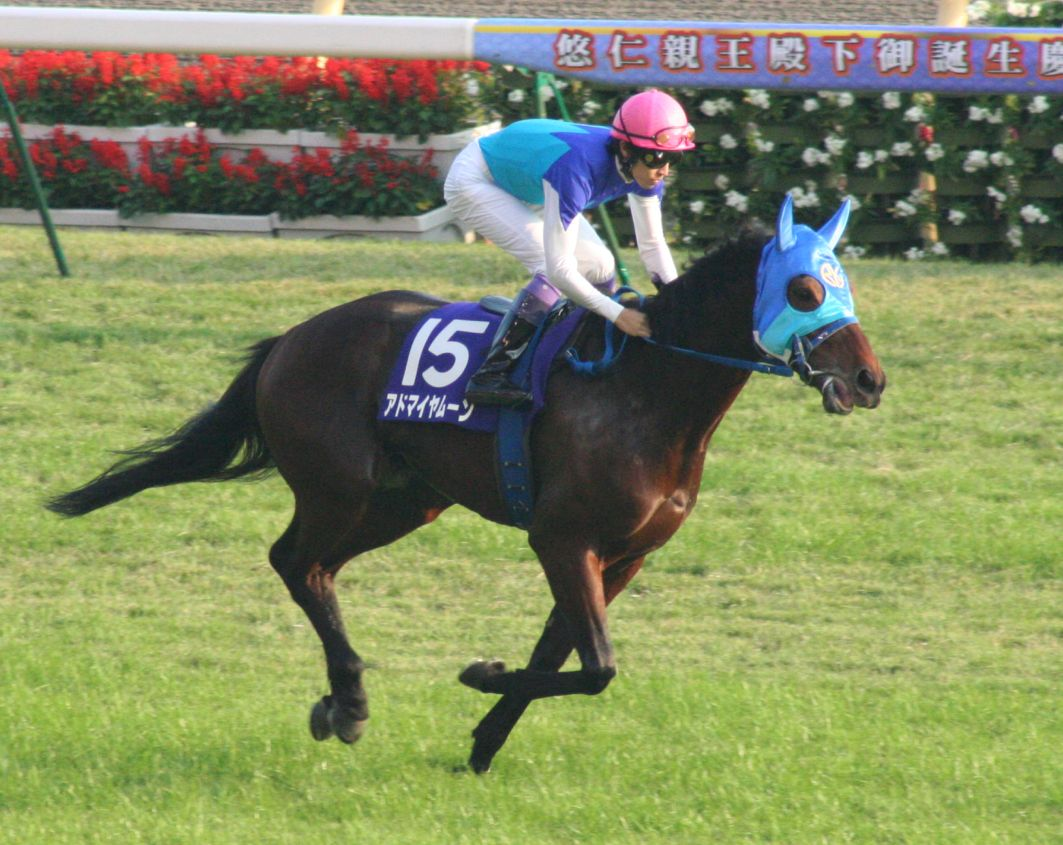
- Admire Moon racing at the 2009 Autumn Tennō Shō.
- Breed: Thoroughbred
- Sire: End Sweep
- Grandsire: Forty Niner
- Dam: My Katies
- Damsire: Sunday Silence
- Sex: Stallion
- Foaled: February 23, 2003
- Died: September 7, 2026 (aged 23)
- Country: Japan
- Colour: Bay
- Breeder: Northern Farm
- Owner: Riichi Kondo; Darley Japan Farm Co Ltd
- Racing colours: →
- Trainer: Hiroyoshi Matsuda
- Jockey: Yutaka Take; Yasunari Iwata
- Record: 17: 10–2–2
- Earnings: 870,462,000 JPY +3,000,000 USD +5,900,000 HKD

Major wins
- Sapporo Nisai Stakes (2005); Kyodo Tsushin Hai (2006); Yayoi Sho (2006); Sapporo Kinen (2006); Kyoto Kinen (2007); Dubai Duty Free Stakes (2007); Takarazuka Kinen (2007); Japan Cup (2007)

Awards
- Japanese Horse of the Year (2007); JRA Award for Best Older Male Horse (2007)

Admire Moon (Japanese: アドマイヤムーン, Hepburn: Adomaiya Mūn; February 23, 2003 – September 2026) was a Japanese racehorse and breeding stallion who won the 2007 Dubai Duty Free Stakes, Takarazuka Kinen and Japan Cup.

== Background ==
Admire Moon was foaled on February 23, 2003, at Northern Farm in Abira, Hokkaido, Japan. He was bred by Katsumi Yoshida. He was sired by champion sire End Sweep, and his dam was My Katies, a daughter of Sunday Silence. During the 2003 Japan Horse Racing Association Select Sale, Admire Moon was sold to Riichi Kondo for ¥16 million (roughly $135,000). He was trained by Ritto Training Center trainer Hiroyoshi Matsuda.

== Racing career ==
=== 2005: two-year-old season ===
In 2005, Admire Moon started four times. He won the Clover Cho and the Sapporo Nisai Stakes, and came second in the Radio Tampa Hai Nisai Stakes.

=== 2006: three-year-old season ===
At the beginning of his three-year-old season, Admire Moon won the Kyodo Tsushin Hai. He then won the Yayoi Sho, a trial race for the Satsuki Sho. Admire Moon ran in the Satsuki Sho later in 2006, his first Grade I race. He placed 4th to Meisho Samson. He then went to Tokyo for the Japanese Derby, the Tokyo Yushun, where he placed 7th, also to Meisho Samson. That August, Admire Moon ran in the Sapporo Kinen, winning it.

Admire Moon returned to Tokyo in late October for the Tenno Sho, not the Kikuka Sho (the Japanese St. Leger), and finished 3rd to Daiwa Major. In December, he traveled to Hong Kong for the Hong Kong Cup, his first-ever race outside Japan. He finished second to Pride by a nose.

=== 2007: four-year-old season ===
In 2007, he raced in Kyoto Kinen and won. He then headed to Dubai for the Dubai Duty Free Stakes. He finished first by half a length, winning his first ever Group One race, over Linngari, Daiwa Major, etc. One month later, he raced in Hong Kong again at the Queen Elizabeth II Cup in which he came third behind Viva Pataca and Vengeance of Rain. On June 24, ridden by jockey Yasunari Iwata, he took on the Takarazuka Kinen by a vote of fans and finished first by half a length ahead of Vodka (the 2007 Tokyo Yushun winner), Daiwa Major etc., winning his first Grade I race in Japan.

In the middle of his four-year-old season, Admire Moon was sold by his owner Riichi Kondo to Godolphin for ¥4 billion ($33 million). The sale was confirmed on July 24 of that year.

Admire Moon then ran in the Japan Cup the same year in November and won by a head over Pop Rock. With the Takarazuka Kinen win earlier in the year, Admire Moon earned a ¥130 million bonus in addition to over ¥250 million in prize money. Admire Moon retired after winning the Japan Cup. Overall, he raced 17 times, came first ten times, came second twice, and came third twice. After his retirement, he was named the Japanese Horse of the Year for 2007, as well as top older male.

== Death ==
Darley Japan announced Admire Moon's death on September 7, 2026. He was 23.

== Racing form ==
Admire Moon won ten races and struck podium four times out of 17 starts. This data is available based on JBIS, netkeiba, Hong Kong Jockey Club and Emirates Racing Authority.

Date	Racecourse	Race	Grade	Distance (Condition)	Entry	HN	Odds (Favored)	Finish	Time	Margins	Jockey	Winner (Runner-up)
2005 – two-year-old season
Jul 10	Hakodate	2yo Newcomer		1,800 m (Firm)	16	11	8.0 (5)	1st	1:54.4	–0.4	Masaru Honda	(Grass Week)
Aug 27	Sapporo	Clover Sho	OP	1,500 m (Firm)	10	10	2.4 (1)	1st	1:29.5	0.0	Masaru Honda	(Nishino Answer)
Oct 1	Sapporo	Sapporo Nisai Stakes	3	1,800 m (Firm)	13	13	2.9 (1)	1st	1:50.4	–0.2	Masaru Honda	(Deep Air)
Dec 24	Hanshin	Radio Tampa Hai Nisai Stakes	3	2,000 m (Firm)	12	8	2.2 (1)	2nd	2:01.9	0.0	Masaru Honda	Sakura Mega Wonder
2006 – three-year-old season
Feb 5	Tokyo	Kyodo News Service Hai	3	1,800 m (Firm)	11	1	2.8 (2)	1st	1:48.4	–0.1	Yutaka Take	(Fusaichi Richard)
Mar 5	Nakayama	Yayoi Sho	2	2,000 m (Firm)	10	2	1.6 (1)	1st	2:01.5	–0.1	Yutaka Take	(Glorious Week)
Apr 16	Nakayama	Satsuki Sho	1	2,000 m (Firm)	18	15	2.2 (1)	4th	2:00.4	0.5	Yutaka Take	Meisho Samson
May 28	Tokyo	Tokyo Yushun	1	2,400 m (Good)	18	10	5.9 (3)	7th	2:28.8	0.9	Yutaka Take	Meisho Samson
Aug 20	Sapporo	Sapporo Kinen	2	2,000 m (Firm)	15	11	3.2 (1)	1st	2:00.3	–0.2	Yutaka Take	(Les Clefs d'Or)
Oct 29	Tokyo	Tenno Sho (Autumn)	1	2,000 m (Firm)	16	15	6.0 (2)	3rd	1:59.0	0.2	Yutaka Take	Daiwa Major
Dec 10	Sha Tin	Hong Kong Cup	1	2,000 m (Firm)	12	7	11.0 (5)	2nd	2:01.6	0.0	Yutaka Take	Pride
2007 – four-year-old season
Feb 17	Kyoto	Kyoto Kinen	2	2,200 m (Good)	14	9	4.0 (2)	1st	2:17.2	0.0	Yutaka Take	(Pop Rock)
Mar 31	Nad Al Sheba	Dubai Duty Free Stakes	1	1,777 m (Good)	16	10	11/2 (1)	1st	1:47.9	0.1	Yutaka Take	(Linngari)
Apr 29	Sha Tin	Queen Elizabeth II Cup	1	2,000 m (Firm)	10	1	1.6 (1)	3rd	1:47.9	0.1	Yutaka Take	Viva Pataca
Jun 24	Hanshin	Takarazuka Kinen	1	2,200 m (Good)	18	6	6.7 (3)	1st	2:12.4	–0.1	Yasunari Iwata	(Meisho Samson)
Oct 28	Tokyo	Tenno Sho (Autumn)	1	2,000 m (Good)	16	12	3.8 (2)	6th	1:59.1	0.7	Yasunari Iwata	Meisho Samson
Nov 25	Tokyo	Japan Cup	1	2,400 m (Firm)	18	4	10.9 (5)	1st	2:24.7	0.0	Yasunari Iwata	(Pop Rock)

Legend:
Turf

== Stud record ==
At the end of his racing career, Admire Moon was retired to become a breeding stallion at Darley Stud. The best of his offspring have included the sprinters Fine Needle and Seiun Kosei, both of whom won the Takamatsunomiya Kinen.

Admire Moon retired from stud duty and was pensioned after the 2024 season.

=== Major winners ===
c = colt, f = filly, g = gelding
bold = grade 1 stakes

Grade winners
Foaled	Name	Sex	Major Wins
2009	Archimedes	c	Asahi Challenge Cup
2009	Fine Choice	f	Hakodate Nisai Stakes
2009	Hakusan Moon	c	Keihan Hai, Ibis Summer Dash, Centaur Stakes
2009	Leo Active	c	Keisei Hai Autumn Handicap, Keio Hai Nisai Stakes
2009	Osumi Moon	c	Kokura Summer Jump, Hanshin Jump Stakes (2x), Kyoto Jump Stakes, Tokyo Jump Stakes, Tokyo High Jump
2012	Black Moon	c	Kyoto Kimpai
2013	Fine Needle	c	Silk Road Stakes, Centaur Stakes (2x), **Takamatsunomiya Kinen**, **Sprinters Stakes**
2013	Love and Pop	c	Tokyo Jump Stakes, Tokyo High Jump
2013	Moonquake	g	Keio Hai Spring Cup
2013	Seiun Kosei	c	Hakodate Sprint Stakes, **Takamatsunomiya Kinen**
2016	Mani	c	Kyoto High Jump
2019	Okini	g	Hanshin Jump Stakes

== Pedigree ==
Pedigree of Admire Moon
Sire End Sweep	Forty Niner	Mr. Prospector	Raise a Native
Sire End Sweep	Forty Niner	Mr. Prospector	Gold Digger
Sire End Sweep	Forty Niner	File	Tom Rolfe
Sire End Sweep	Forty Niner	File	Continue
Sire End Sweep	Broom Dance	Dance Spell	Northern Dancer
Sire End Sweep	Broom Dance	Dance Spell	Obeah
Sire End Sweep	Broom Dance	Witching Hour	Thinking Cap
Sire End Sweep	Broom Dance	Witching Hour	Enchanted Eye
Dam My Katies	Sunday Silence	Halo	Hail to Reason
Dam My Katies	Sunday Silence	Halo	Cosmah
Dam My Katies	Sunday Silence	Wishing Well	Understanding
Dam My Katies	Sunday Silence	Wishing Well	Mountain Flower
Dam My Katies	Katies First	Kris	Sharpen Up
Dam My Katies	Katies First	Kris	Doubly Sure
Dam My Katies	Katies First	Katies	Nonoalco
Dam My Katies	Katies First	Katies	Mortefontaine F-No. 7-f
