= Yasunari Iwata =

Japanese jockey

- Iwata in 2026 (Ocean Stakes)

Personal information
- Native name: 岩田康誠
- Nationality: Japanese
- Born: March 12, 1974 (age 52) Himeji, Hyogo
- Occupation: Jockey
- Height: 159 cm (5 ft 3 in)
- Weight: 52 kg (115 lb)
- Children: 2 (including Mirai Iwata)

Horse racing career
- Sport: Horse racing
- Career winnings: JRA Award for Best Jockey (money earned) (2008, 2011, 2012, 2014); JRA Award for Best Jockey (races won) (2011, 2012)
- Career wins: 1,932 (As of Dec. 22, 2022)

Yasunari Iwata (岩田 康誠, Iwata Yasunari) (born March 12, 1974; from Himeji, Hyōgo Prefecture) is a Japanese jockey who rode the winner of the 2006 Melbourne Cup, Delta Blues. It was Iwata's first race outside Japan.

He debuted in the Hyōgo Keiba, one of the racing organizations in National Association of Racing (NAR). He has started riding in selected events in Japan Racing Association (JRA) since 2002. In 2005, Iwata won the 19th World Super Jockey Series . Despite not having passed the written test in the past, he was allowed to transfer to JRA in the following year due to "Ankatsu's Rule".

He was awarded JRA most winning-jockey in 2011 and 2012, in races won and money earned.

His son, Mirai, is also a jockey.

== Major wins ==
Australia

- Melbourne Cup - (1) - Delta Blues (2006)

Hong Kong

- Hong Kong Sprint - (2) - Lord Kanaloa (2012/2013)

Japan

- Asahi Hai Futurity Stakes - (1) - Seiun Wonder (2008)
- February Stakes - (1) - Testa Matta (2012)
- Japan Breeding farm's Cup Classic - (1) - Time Paradox (2006)
- Japan Breeding Farms' Cup Ladies' Classic - (1) - Sambista (2014)
- Japan Breeding Farms' Cup Sprint - (1) - Dream Valentino (2014)
- Japan Cup - (3) - Admire Moon (2007), Buena Vista (2011), Gentildonna (2012)
- Japan Dirt Derby - (1) - Testa Matta (2009)
- Kikuka Sho - (1) - Delta Blues (2004)
- Mile Championship - (2) - A Shin Forward (2010), Danon Shark (2014)
- Oka Sho - (2) - Gentildonna (2012), Let's Go Donki (2015)
- Satsuki Sho (Japanese 2000 Guineas) - (2) - Unrivaled (2009), Victoire Pisa (2010)
- Shuka Sho - (3) - Black Emblem (2008), Aventura (2011), Gentildonna (2012)
- Sprinters Stakes - (1) - Lord Kanaloa (2012)
- Takamatsunomiya Kinen - (1) - Lord Kanaloa (2013)
- Takarazuka Kinen - (1) - Admire Moon (2007)
- Tenno Sho (Spring) - (2) - Admire Jupiter (2008), Rainbow Line (2018)
- Tokyo Daishōten - (1) - Roman Legend (2012)
- Tokyo Yushun (Japanese Derby) - (1) - Deep Brillante (2012)
- Yasuda Kinen - (2) - Vodka (2008), Lord Kanaloa (2013)
- Yushun Himba - (1) - Nuovo Record (2014)
