= Vivlos =

Japanese-bred Thoroughbred racehorse

Vivlos ヴィブロス
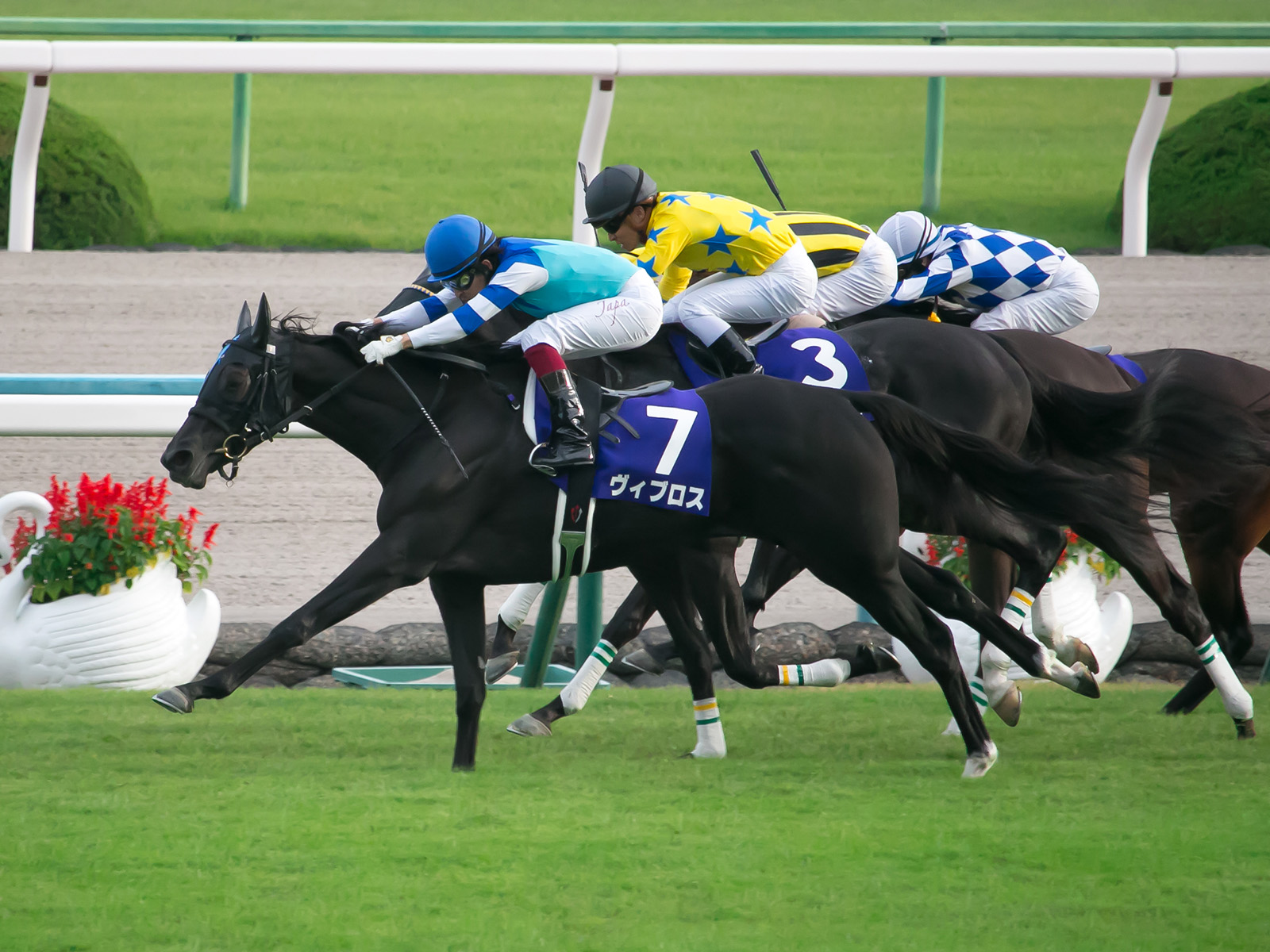
- Vivlos winning the 2016 Shūka Shō.
- Breed: Thoroughbred
- Sire: Deep Impact (JPN)
- Grandsire: Sunday Silence (USA)
- Dam: Halwa Sweet (JPN)
- Damsire: Machiavellian (USA)
- Sex: Mare
- Foaled: April 9, 2013 (age 13)
- Country: Japan
- Colour: Black
- Breeder: Northern Farm
- Owner: Kazuhiro Sasaki
- Racing colours
- Trainer: Yasuo Tomomichi
- Jockey: Yuichi Fukunaga; Joao Moreira
- Record: 17: 4-6-0
- Earnings: £6,314,436

Major wins
- Dubai Turf (2017); Japanese Classic Tiara Race wins: Shuka Sho (2016)

Awards
- JRA Award for Best Older Filly or Mare (2017)

Vivlos (Japanese: ヴィブロス, Hepburn: Viburosu; foaled 9 April 2013) is a Japanese Thoroughbred racehorse and broodmare. She showed some promise as a juvenile in 2015 when she won a minor race on the second of her two starts. In the following year she was moved up in class and made steady progress, ending her season with a win in the Grade 1 Shuka Sho. As a four-year-old she defeated an international field to take the Dubai Turf and won the JRA Award for Best Older Filly or Mare. In 2018 she failed to win a race but finished second in both the Dubai Turf and the Hong Kong Mile. On her final racecourse appearance she finished second in the 2019 Dubai Turf.

== Background ==
Vivlos is a black mare bred in Japan by Northern Farm. During her racing career she was owned by the baseball star Kazuhiro Sasaki and trained by Yasuo Tomomichi.

She was from the sixth crop of foals sired by Deep Impact, who was the Japanese Horse of the Year in 2005 and 2006, winning races including the Tokyo Yushun, Tenno Sho, Arima Kinen and Japan Cup. Deep Impact's other progeny include Gentildonna, Harp Star, Kizuna, A Shin Hikari, Marialite and Saxon Warrior. Vivlos' dam Halwa Sweet showed some racing ability, winning five minor races from 22 starts, but became an outstanding broodmare whose previous foals included Verxina and Cheval Grand. Her granddam Morn of Song was a full-sister to Rahy and a half-sister to Singspiel.

== Racing career ==
=== 2015: two-year-old season ===
Vivlos began her racing career by finishing a close second to Classic Lydia in an event for previously unraced juveniles over 1600 metres at Kyoto Racecourse on 24 October. At the same track four weeks later she was stepped up in distance for a maiden race over 1800 metres and recorded her first success as she won from Ribbon Flower and nine others.

=== 2016: three-year-old season ===
In March 2016 Vivlos was moved up to Grade 3 class but made no impact in her first two starts as she finished towards the rear in both the Tulip Sho at Hanshin Racecourse and the Flower Cup at Nakayama Racecourse. After a three-month break, she returned to winning form as she took a minor race over 2000 metres at Chukyo Racecourse in July.

On 10 September at Nakayama Vivlos started at odds of 4.8/1 for the Grade 3 Shion Stakes (a trial race for the Shuka Sho) and finished second of the eighteen runners, beaten two and a half lengths by the favourite Biche. In the Grade 1 Shuka Sho over 2000 metres at Kyoto on 16 October Vivlos, ridden by Yuichi Fukunaga, started the 5.3/1 third choice in the betting behind Biche and Jeweler. After racing in mid-division she produced a strong late run, took the lead in the closing stages and won by half a length from Pearl Code, with Kaiserball and Jeweler close behind. After the race Fukunaga said "We were in a perfect position and the trip was smooth and in good rhythm. I was aware of Biche behind me at the third corner but we were able to pick our own timing for the move. Her sister (Verxina) had a lot of speed and staying power but this filly has a tremendous burst of speed".

In the JRA Awards for 2016 Vivlos finished third behind Sinhalite and Jeweler in the voting for the JRA Award for Best Three-Year-Old Filly.

=== 2017: four-year-old season ===
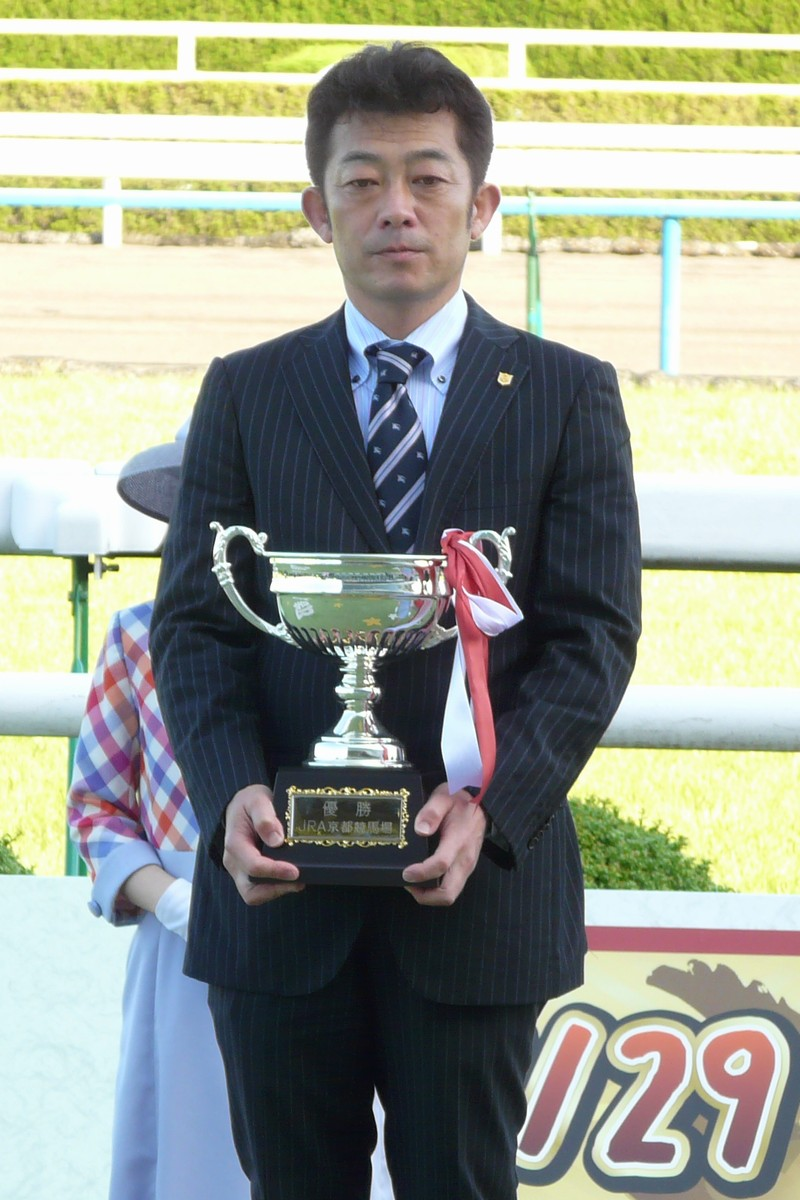
Vivlos's trainer Yasuo Tomomichi

On her 2017 debut Vivlos was matched against male opposition in the Grade 2 Nakayama Kinen over 1800 metres on 26 February in which she stayed on well from the rear of the field to finish fifth of the eleven runners, two lengths behind the six-year-old winner Neorealism. The filly was then sent to the United Arab Emirates to contest the Dubai Turf over 1800 metres at Meydan Racecourse on 25 March in which she was ridden by the Hong Kong-based Brazilian jockey João Moreira and started at odds of 14/1. The French colt Zarak started favourite ahead of the British-trained Ribchester while the other ten runners included Decorated Knight (Irish Champion Stakes), Deauville (Belmont Derby) and Mondialiste (Arlington Million). After racing towards the rear of the field as Ribchester set the pace Vivlos began to make progress and moved up to make her challenge on the outside in the straight. The outsider Heshem gained the advantage from Ribchester inside the final furlong but Vivlos took the lead in the closing stages to win by half a length. Moreira commented "She was brilliant. From the time that I sat on top of her on Friday, she gave me the feel that she was going to be very competitive... She made the job very easy for me today. We were travelling nice and when I took her out and she had daylight, she was strong to the line." Her trainer Yasuo Tomomichi said "She travelled very well from Japan and she was very relaxed in Dubai. She relaxed again in the back of the field and quickened very well. It kept raining but the ground wasn't too soft, which suited her."

After an absence of over six months Vivlos returned in the Grade 2 Fuchu Himba Stakes at Tokyo Racecourse on 14 October. She started the 2.2/1 favourite against thirteen other fillies and mares but despite finishing strongly she failed by a neck to overhaul Crocosmia. Four weeks later the filly was stepped up in distance and started 1.8/1 favourite for the Grade 1 Queen Elizabeth II Cup over 2200 metres at Kyoto in which she was partnered by Christophe Lemaire. She was in contention throughout the race but was unable to make any significant progress in the closing stages and came home fifth behind the three-year-old Mozu Katchan.

In January 2018 she topped the poll to take the JRA Award for Best Older Filly or Mare for 2017 with 194 of the 290 votes.

In the 2017 World's Best Racehorse Rankings, Vivlos was given a rating of 117, making her the 129th-best horse in the world and the fifth-best four-year-old filly behind Minding, Marsha, Persuasive and Songbird.

=== 2018 & 2019: five and six-year-old seasons ===
In 2018 Vivlos again began her campaign in the Nakayama Kinen. On this occasion she started at odds of 5.4/1 and finished eighth of the ten runners behind the four-year-old colt Win Bright, beaten three and a half lengths by the winner. On 31 March the mare returned to Meydan Racecourse in an attempt to repeat her 2017 success in the Dubai Turf. Despite never looking likely to trouble the winner Benbatl she stayed on strongly in the straight to take second place ahead of her fellow Japanese challengers Deirdre and Real Steel. Almost three months later she was one of sixteen horses invited to contest the Takarazuka Kinen over 2200 metres at Hanshin Racecourse and kept on well in the closing stages to come home fourth behind Mikki Rocket.

After a summer break of over four months Vivlos returned for the autumn edition of the Tenno Sho over 2000 metres at Tokyo on 28 October. She started at odds of 16.4/1 and came home eighth of the twelve runners behind Rey de Oro. For her final start of the year the mare was sent to Sha Tin Racecourse for the Hong Kong Mile on 9 December. Starting a 57/1 outsider she exceeded expectations as she came from well off the pace to take second place behind the local champion Beauty Generation.

Despite expectations that she would be retired at the end of 2018, Vivlos returned for a final run in the 2019 edition of the Dubai Turf on 30 March. As in the previous year she came with a strong late run to take second place, beaten one and a quarter lengths by Almond Eye. After the race Tomomichi said "everything went right. It was her third time here and she clearly seems to really like Dubai and we’re really grateful of all that she achieved at this place. She's calling it a career now but I hope to be back in Dubai with her kid one day."

== Breeding career ==
c = colt, f = filly

No.	Name	Foaled	Sex	Color	Sire	Wins	Races	Remarks
1st	Vencedores	2020	c	Brown	Lord Kanaloa	2	22	Active
2nd	Shivers	2021	c	Chestnut	Maurice	4	15	Active
3rd	Kravans	2022	c	Bay	Lord Kanaloa	2	10	Active
4th	Amber Waves	2023	f	Brown	Drefong	0	2	Active
5th	Zevius	2024	c	Chestnut	Epiphaneia			Pre-debut
6th	(Vivlos 2025)	2025	f	Black	Saturnalia			
	(not foaled)	2026			Efforia			

== In popular culture ==
An anthropomorphized version of Vivlos appears as a character in the Japanese multimedia franchise Umamusume: Pretty Derby, voiced by Ayasa Itō. She is depicted as the younger sister of Cheval Grand and Verxina, and is incredibly immature, spoiled, and materialistic due to her wealthy upbringing. Her dream is to live the life of a celebrity by racing in Dubai, which she had visited on a vacation with her family once during her childhood, and reflects her real-life counterpart's extensive history of racing in Dubai as well as internationally.

== Racing form ==
Vivlos won four races in 17 starts. This data is available based on JBIS, netkeiba, HKJC and racingpost.

Date	Age	Track	Race	Grade	Distance (Condition)	Entry	HN	Odds (Favored)	Finish	Time	Margins	Jockey	Winner (Runner-up)
Oct 24, 2015	2	Kyoto	2yo Newcomer		1,600 m (Firm)	14	5	1.3 (1)	2nd	1:35.6	0.1	Cristian Demuro	Classic Lydia
Nov 21, 2015	2	Kyoto	2yo Maiden		1,800 m (Firm)	11	8	2.3 (1)	1st	1:48.8	–0.2	Mirco Demuro	(Ribbon Flower)
Mar 5, 2016	3	Hanshin	Tulip Sho	3	1,600 m (Firm)	16	3	30.7 (8)	12th	1:33.7	0.9	Hiroyuki Uchida	Sinhalite
Mar 21, 2016	3	Nakayama	Flower Cup	3	1,800 m (Firm)	16	6	23.0 (10)	12th	1:50.1	0.8	Hiroyuki Uchida	Angel Face
Jul 24, 2016	3	Chukyo	3yo+ Allowance	1W	2,000 m (Firm)	14	2	6.7 (3)	1st	2:00.5	–0.7	Yuichi Fukunaga	(Aoi Princess)
Sep 10, 2016	3	Nakayama	Shion Stakes	3	2,000 m (Firm)	18	9	5.8 (3)	2nd	2:00.1	0.4	Yuichi Fukunaga	Biche
Oct 16, 2016	3	Kyoto	Shuka Sho	1	2,000 m (Firm)	18	7	6.3 (3)	1st	1:58.6	–0.1	Yuichi Fukunaga	(Pearl Code)
Feb 26, 2017	4	Nakayama	Nakayama Kinen	2	1,800 m (Firm)	11	3	8.3 (4)	5th	1:47.9	0.3	Hiroyuki Uchida	Neorealism
Mar 25, 2017	4	Meydan	Dubai Turf	1	1,800 m (Good)	13	9	8.8 (5)	1st	1:50.2	0.1	Joao Moreira	(Heshem)
Oct 14, 2017	4	Tokyo	Ireland Trophy	2	1,800 m (Good)	14	1	3.2 (1)	2nd	1:48.1	0.0	Christophe Lemaire	Crocosmia
Nov 12, 2017	4	Kyoto	QEII Cup	1	2,200 m (Firm)	18	16	2.8 (1)	5th	2:14.6	0.3	Christophe Lemaire	Mozu Katchan
Feb 25, 2018	5	Nakayama	Nakayama Kinen	2	1,800 m (Firm)	10	3	6.4 (3)	8th	1:48.1	0.5	Hiroyuki Uchida	Win Bright
Mar 31, 2018	5	Meydan	Dubai Turf	1	1,800 m (Firm)	15	7	8.0 (4)	2nd	1:46.6	0.6	Cristian Demuro	Benbatl
Jun 24, 2018	5	Hanshin	Takarazuka Kinen	1	2,200 m (Good)	16	10	6.5 (3)	4th	2:12.1	0.5	Yuichi Fukunaga	Mikki Rocket
Oct 28, 2018	5	Tokyo	Tenno Sho (Autumn)	1	2,000 m (Firm)	12	3	17.4 (7)	8th	1:57.7	0.9	Yuichi Fukunaga	Rey de Oro
Dec 9, 2018	5	Sha Tin	Hong Kong Mile	1	1,600 m (Firm)	14	14	13.8 (4)	2nd	1:34.0	0.5	William Buick	Beauty Generation
Mar 30, 2019	6	Meydan	Dubai Turf	1	1,800 m (Firm)	13	4	22.5 (4)	2nd	1:47.0	0.2	Mickael Barzalona	Almond Eye

Legend:
Turf

== Pedigree ==
Pedigree of Vivlos (JPN), black mare 2013
Sire Deep Impact (JPN) 2002	Sunday Silence (USA); 1986	Halo	Hail to Reason
Sire Deep Impact (JPN) 2002	Sunday Silence (USA); 1986	Halo	Cosmah
Sire Deep Impact (JPN) 2002	Sunday Silence (USA); 1986	Wishing Well	Understanding
Sire Deep Impact (JPN) 2002	Sunday Silence (USA); 1986	Wishing Well	Mountain Flower
Sire Deep Impact (JPN) 2002	Wind in Her Hair (IRE); 1991	Alzao (USA)	Lyphard
Sire Deep Impact (JPN) 2002	Wind in Her Hair (IRE); 1991	Alzao (USA)	Lady Rebecca (GB)
Sire Deep Impact (JPN) 2002	Wind in Her Hair (IRE); 1991	Burghclere (GB)	Busted
Sire Deep Impact (JPN) 2002	Wind in Her Hair (IRE); 1991	Burghclere (GB)	Highclere
Dam Halwa Sweet (JPN) 2001	Machiavellian (USA); 1987	Mr. Prospector	Raise a Native
Dam Halwa Sweet (JPN) 2001	Machiavellian (USA); 1987	Mr. Prospector	Gold Digger
Dam Halwa Sweet (JPN) 2001	Machiavellian (USA); 1987	Coup de Folie	Halo
Dam Halwa Sweet (JPN) 2001	Machiavellian (USA); 1987	Coup de Folie	Raise The Standard (CAN)
Dam Halwa Sweet (JPN) 2001	Halwa Song (USA); 1996	Nureyev	Northern Dancer (CAN)
Dam Halwa Sweet (JPN) 2001	Halwa Song (USA); 1996	Nureyev	Special
Dam Halwa Sweet (JPN) 2001	Halwa Song (USA); 1996	Morn of Song	Blushing Groom (FR)
Dam Halwa Sweet (JPN) 2001	Halwa Song (USA); 1996	Morn of Song	Glorious Song (CAN) (Family: 12-c)

- Vivlos was inbred 3 × 4 to Halo, meaning that this stallion appeared in both the third and fourth generations of her pedigree.
