= Major Emblem =

Japanese Thoroughbred racehorse

Major Emblem メジャーエンブレム
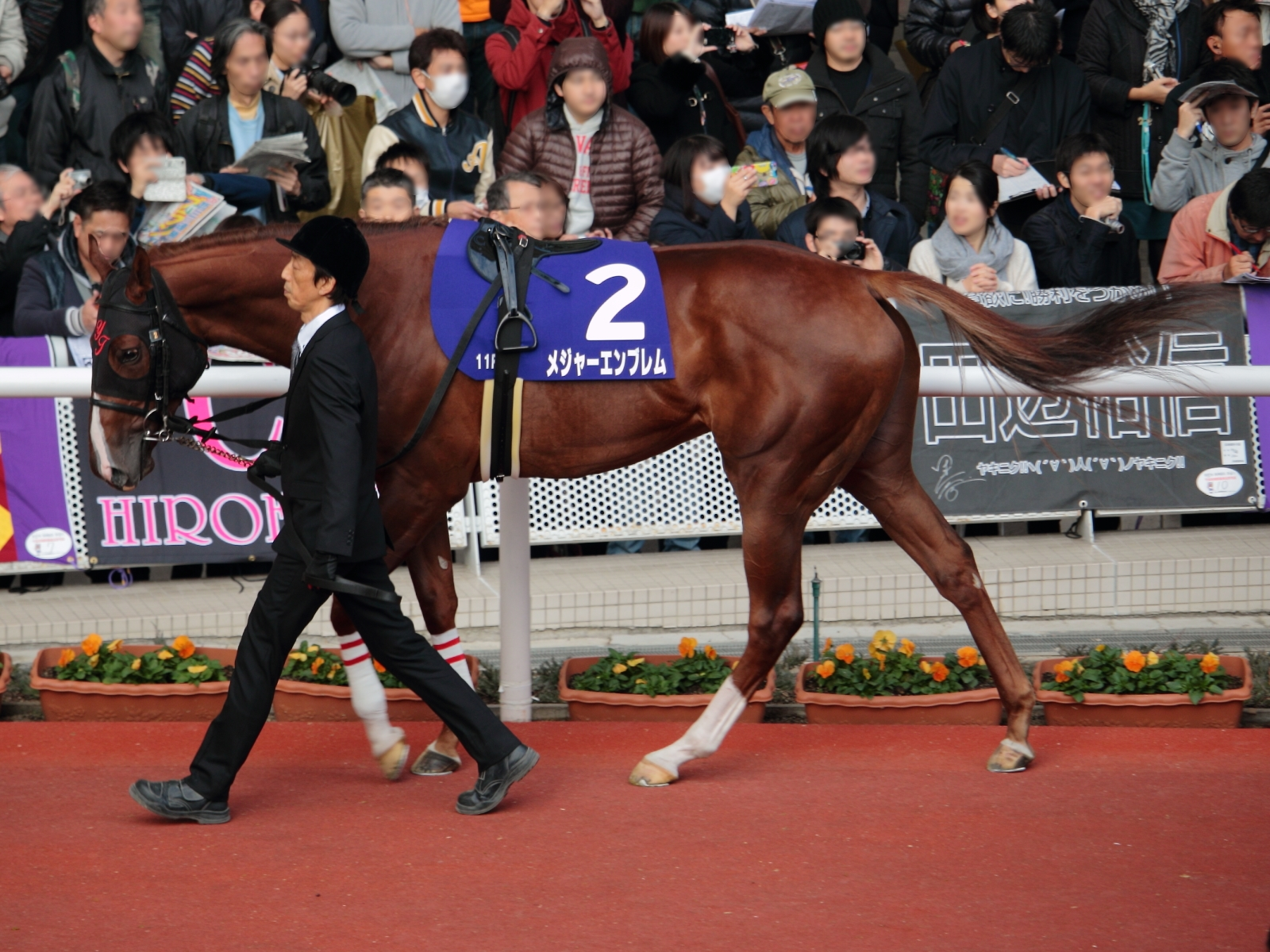
- Major Emblem in 2015
- Sire: Daiwa Major
- Grandsire: Sunday Silence
- Dam: Catchy Title
- Damsire: Opera House
- Sex: Mare
- Foaled: 26 March 2013
- Country: Japan
- Colour: Chestnut
- Breeder: Northern Farm
- Owner: Sunday Racing Co Ltd
- Racing colours
- Trainer: Yasuhito Tamura
- Jockey: Christophe Lemaire
- Record: 7: 5-1-0
- Earnings: 243,107,000 JPY

Major wins
- Hanshin Juvenile Fillies (2015); Queen Cup (2016); NHK Mile Cup (2016)

Awards
- JRA Award for Best Two-Year-Old Filly (2015)

Major Emblem (Japanese: メジャーエンブレム, Hepburn: Mejā Enburemu; foaled 26 March 2013) is a Japanese Thoroughbred racehorse and broodmare. As a juvenile in 2015 she was the best filly of her generation in Japan, winning three of her four races including the Hanshin Juvenile Fillies and taking the JRA Award for Best Two-Year-Old Filly. In the following year she won two of her three races, adding a second major success when she defeated male opposition to take the NHK Mile Cup.

== Background ==
Major Emblem is a chestnut mare with a white blaze and a long white sock on her left hind leg bred in Hokkaido by Northern Farm. During her racing career she was trained by Yasuhito Tamura and carried the black, red and yellow silks of Sunday Racing. She was ridden in all of her major races by Christophe Lemaire.

She was from the fifth crop of foals sired by Daiwa Major, an outstanding miler whose wins included the Tenno Sho, Mile Championship and Yasuda Kinen. As a breeding stallion he has also sired Admire Mars, Curren Black Hill (NHK Mile Cup), Reine Minoru (Oka Sho) and Epice Arome (Centaur Stakes). Major Emblem's dam Catchy Title showed good racing ability, winning five of her 20 races between July 2006 and March 2009. Catchy Title's female ancestry was not technically Thoroughbred as it could not be traced to one of the foundation mares of the breed. She was a product of the half-bred Verdict family, whose ancestry could be traced no further back than an unnamed mare foaled in 1837. So many non-thoroughbreds from this family won major races that they were admitted to the General Stud Book in 1969 as Half-Bred Family 3. Members of this family include Quashed, Attraction and Sonic Lady.

== Racing career ==
=== 2015: two-year-old season ===
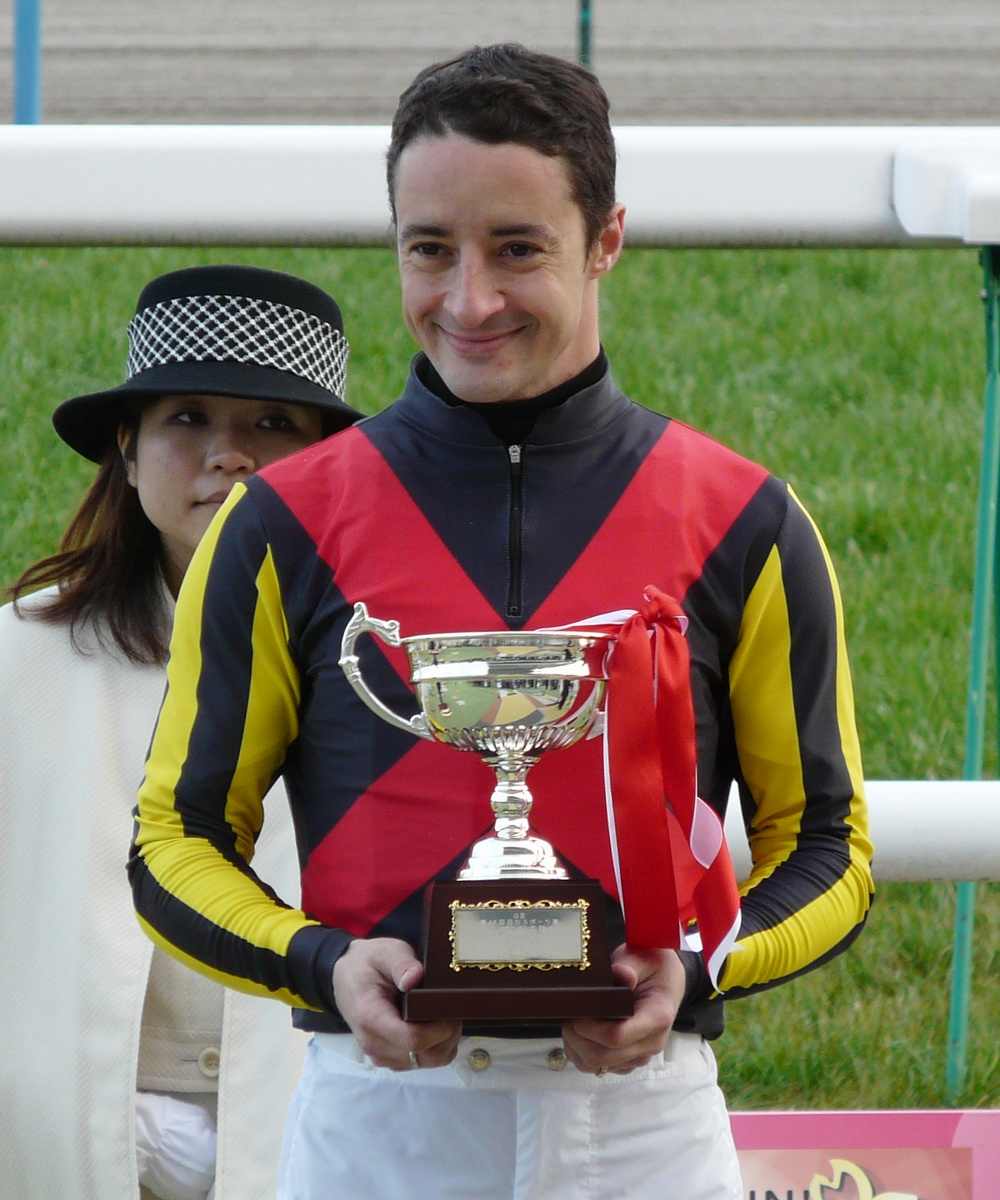
Christophe Lemaire, who rode Major Emblem in all of her races

At Tokyo on 14 June Major Emblem began her racing career with a win in an event for previously unraced juveniles over 1800 metres. After the summer break she returned for the Aster Sho over 1600 metres at Nakayama Racecourse in September and won against Matera Arion and seven others. In the Grade 3 Artemis Stakes over 1600 metres at Tokyo on 31 October the filly started the 1.2/1 favourite against fourteen opponents but after looking likely to win she was caught in the final stride and beaten a neck by the 82/1 outsider Denko Ange. After the race her training regime was altered with Yasuhito Tamura explaining "we have changed her training pattern by giving her a horse to follow, and keeping her back and being patient with her. This makes her more controllable, and it's clear she's able to run like this with patience."

On 13 December in the Grade 1 Hanshin Juvenile Fillies over 1600 metres at Hanshin Racecourse, Major Emblem started the 1.5/1 favourite ahead of Denko Ange, with the best fancied of the other sixteen runners being Blanc Bonheur (Hakodate Nisai Stakes) and the previously undefeated At The Seaside. Major Emblem broke quickly and settled just behind the leaders on the inside rail before moving to the front on the final turn. She opened up a clear lead and never looked in any danger of defeat, coming home two lengths in front of the outsider Win Fabulous. Christophe Lemaire commented "She surprisingly broke very well and I’m glad we drew an inner stall. She is easy to ride and was relaxed today. She ran strongly to the finish line and I’m very happy we were able to claim the G1 race. She's an amazing filly and I’m sure she’ll do well in the classics".

=== 2016: three-year-old season ===
Major Emblem began her second campaign in the Grade 3 Queen Cup at Tokyo on 13 February. She started the odds-on favourite and had no difficulty justifying her position at the head of the betting market as she came home five lengths clear of Frontier Queen. At Hanshin on 10 April the filly started odds-on favourite for the Grade 1 Oka Sho over 1600 metres at Hanshin. She raced in sixth place before taking the lead in the straight but was overtaken in the closing stages and finished fourth behind Jeweler, Sinhalite and At The Seaside.

Rather than stepping up in trip for the Yushun Himba, Major Emblem was matched against male opposition in the NHK Mile Cup at Tokyo Racecourse on 8 May. She was made the 1.3/1 favourite against seventeen opponents the best of whom, according to the betting market, were the colts Lord Quest (Niigata Nisai Stakes), Tizona and Tosho Drafter (Falcon Stakes). The filly took the lead from the start, shook off a challenge from Sigerunokogirizame on the final turn and kept on well down the straight to win by three quarters of a length and a neck from Lord Quest and the outsider Rainbow Line. After the race Lemaire said "She broke sharply today and I was able to place her in front. She has good speed and having already won a G1 title last year and another graded race earlier this year, I would say that she has confirmed her position as the top of her class with this G1 win".

Major Emblem subsequently suffered from injury problems and did not race again. She was retired in January 2017 to become a broodmare at Northern Farm.

== Racing form ==
Major Emblem won five races and placed second once in seven starts. This data is available based on JBIS and netkeiba.

Date	Track	Race	Grade	Distance (Condition)	Entry	HN	Odds (Favored)	Finish	Time	Margins	Jockey	Winner (Runner-up)
2015 – two-year-old season
Jun 14	Tokyo	2yo Newcomer		1,800 m (Firm)	14	12	2.6 (1)	1st	1:50.0	–0.2	Christophe Lemaire	(Prince Charmant)
Sep 12	Nakayama	Aster Sho	ALW (1W)	1,600 m (Firm)	9	2	1.2 (1)	1st	1:36.5	–0.4	Christophe Lemaire	(Matera Arion)
Oct 31	Tokyo	Artemis Stakes	3	1,600 m (Firm)	15	15	2.2 (1)	2nd	1:34.1	0.0	Christophe Lemaire	Denko Ange
Dec 13	Hanshin	Hanshin Juvenile Fillies	1	1,600 m (Firm)	18	2	2.5 (1)	1st	1:34.5	–0.3	Christophe Lemaire	(Win Fabulous)
2016 – three-year-old season
Feb 13	Tokyo	Daily Hai Queen Cup	3	1,600 m (Firm)	16	6	1.3 (1)	1st	1:32.5	–0.8	Christophe Lemaire	(Frontier Queen)
Apr 10	Hanshin	Oka Sho	1	1,600 m (Firm)	18	5	1.5 (1)	4th	1:33.8	0.4	Christophe Lemaire	Jeweler
May 8	Tokyo	NHK Mile Cup	1	1,600 m (Firm)	18	4	2.3 (1)	1st	1:32.8	–0.1	Christophe Lemaire	(Lord Quest)

Legend:
Turf

== Broodmare career ==
As of May 2026, Major Emblem has foaled 8 crops.

	Year	Name	Sex	Coat	Sire	Owner	Trainer	Career
1	2018	Premiere Emblem	Filly	Bay	Rulership	Sunday Racing	Yasuhito Tamura	10 starts, 2 wins (retired)
2	2019	Holy Emblem	Filly	Bay	Lord Kanaloa	Sunday Racing	Yasuhito Tamura	16 starts, 1 win (retired)
3	2020	Swag Chain	Colt	Bay	Lord Kanaloa	Sunday Racing	Yasuhito Tamura	4 starts, 0 wins (retired)
4	2021	Roll of Arms	Filly	Bay	Lord Kanaloa	Sunday Racing	Yasuhito Tamura	6 starts, 0 wins (retired)
5	2022	Carrera Emblema	Colt	Bay	Saturnalia	Sunday Racing	Yasuhito Tamura	3 starts, 0 wins (retired)
6	2023	Regina Regalia	Filly	Chestnut	Rey de Oro	Carrot Farm	Koichi Ishizaka	4 starts, 0 wins (active)
7	2024	Star Burner	Filly	Chestnut	Epiphaneia	TN Racing	Koshiro Take	unraced (active)
8	2025	(unnamed)	Colt	Bay	Drefong	Makoto Kaneko		unraced (active)
9	2026	(unnamed)	Filly	Bay	Maurice			unraced (active)

== Assessment and awards ==
In the JRA Awards for 2015 Major Emblem topped the poll for the JRA Award for Best Two-Year-Old Filly taking all 291 of the votes. In the JRA Awards for 2016 Major Emblem finished third behind Sinhalite in the voting for the JRA Award for Best Three-Year-Old Filly.

== Pedigree ==
Pedigree of Major Emblem (JPN), chestnut mare 2013
Sire Daiwa Major (JPN) 2001	Sunday Silence (USA); 1986	Halo	Hail to Reason
Sire Daiwa Major (JPN) 2001	Sunday Silence (USA); 1986	Halo	Cosmah
Sire Daiwa Major (JPN) 2001	Sunday Silence (USA); 1986	Wishing Well	Understanding
Sire Daiwa Major (JPN) 2001	Sunday Silence (USA); 1986	Wishing Well	Mountain Flower
Sire Daiwa Major (JPN) 2001	Scarlet Bouquet (JPN); 1988	Northern Taste	Northern Dancer
Sire Daiwa Major (JPN) 2001	Scarlet Bouquet (JPN); 1988	Northern Taste	Lady Victoria
Sire Daiwa Major (JPN) 2001	Scarlet Bouquet (JPN); 1988	Scarlet Ink	Crimson Satan
Sire Daiwa Major (JPN) 2001	Scarlet Bouquet (JPN); 1988	Scarlet Ink	Consentida
Dam Catchy Title (JPN) 2003	Opera House (GB); 1988	Sadler's Wells	Northern Dancer
Dam Catchy Title (JPN) 2003	Opera House (GB); 1988	Sadler's Wells	Fairy Bridge
Dam Catchy Title (JPN) 2003	Opera House (GB); 1988	Colorspin	High Top
Dam Catchy Title (JPN) 2003	Opera House (GB); 1988	Colorspin	Reprocolor
Dam Catchy Title (JPN) 2003	Titled (GB); 1996	Rainbow Quest	Blushing Groom
Dam Catchy Title (JPN) 2003	Titled (GB); 1996	Rainbow Quest	I Will Follow
Dam Catchy Title (JPN) 2003	Titled (GB); 1996	Her Ladyship	Polish Precedent
Dam Catchy Title (JPN) 2003	Titled (GB); 1996	Her Ladyship	Upper Strata (Family: B3)

- Major Emblem was inbred 4 × 4 to Northern Dancer, meaning that this stallion appears twice in the fourth generation of her pedigree.
