= 2011 Dubai World Cup =

2011 horse race in Dubai

16th Dubai World Cup
- Dubai World Cup
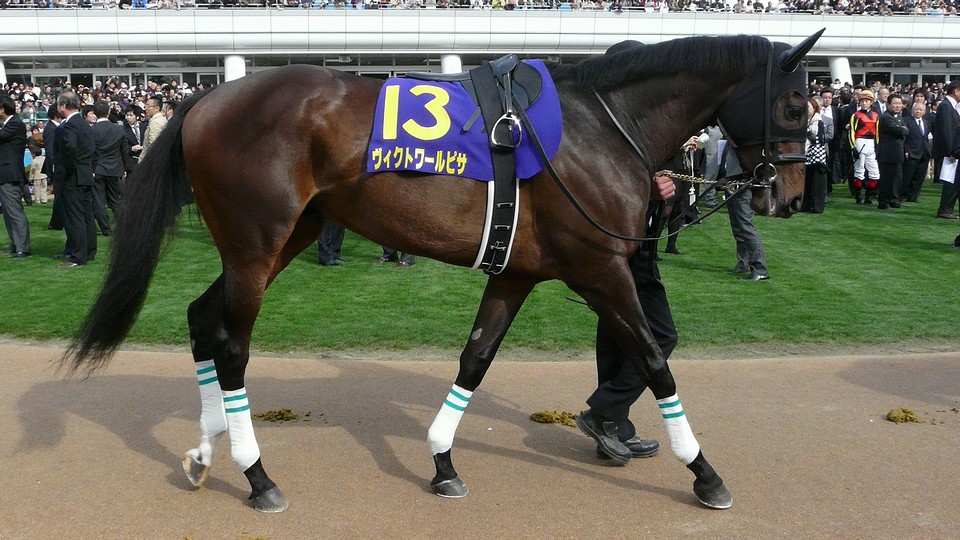
- Location: Meydan
- Date: 26 March 2011
- Winning horse: Victoire Pisa (JPN)
- Jockey: Mirco Demuro
- Trainer: Katsuhiko Sumii (JPN)
- Owner: Yoshimi Ichikawa

The 2011 Dubai World Cup was a horse race held at Meydan Racecourse on Saturday 26 March 2011. It was the 16th running of the Dubai World Cup.

The winner was Yoshimi Ichikawa's Victoire Pisa, a four-year-old dark bay or brown colt trained in Japan by Katsuhiko Sumii and ridden by Mirco Demuro. Victoire Pisa's victory was the first in the race for his jockey, trainer and owner and the first for a horse trained in Japan.

Victoire Pisa had been the champion three-year-old colt in Japan in 2010 when he had won the Satsuki Shō and the Arima Kinen. Before being sent to Dubai he had been campaigned exclusively on turf: the World Cup was his first race on a synthetic surface. In the 2011 Dubai World Cup he started a 20/1 outsider and won by half a length from another Japanese horse Transcend (a dirt specialist), with the Godolphin runner Monterosso a neck away in third. The 2/1 favourite Twice Over finished ninth of the fourteen runners.

== Race details ==
- Sponsor: Emirates
- Purse: £6,410,256; First prize: £3,846,153
- Surface: Tapeta
- Going: Standard
- Distance: 10 furlongs
- Number of runners: 14
- Winner's time: 2:05.94

== Full result ==
Pos.	Marg.	Horse (bred)	Age	Jockey	Trainer (Country)	Odds
1		Victoire Pisa (JPN)	4	Mirco Demuro	Katsuhiko Sumii (JPN)	20/1
2	½	Transcend (JPN)	5	Shinji Fujita	Takayuki Yasuda (JPN)	40/1
3	nk	Monterosso (GB)	4	Mickael Barzalona	Mahmood Al Zarooni (GB/UAE)	40/1
4	nk	Cape Blanco (IRE)	4	Jamie Spencer	Aidan O'Brien (IRE)	4/1
5	¾	Gio Ponti (USA)	6	Ramon A. Dominguez	Christophe Clement (USA)	12/1
6	1	Gitano Hernando (GB)	5	Johnny Murtagh	Marco Botti (GB)	14/1
7	½	Musir (AUS)	5	Christophe Soumillon	Mike de Kock (SAF)	12/1
8	½	Buena Vista (JPN)	5	Ryan Moore	Hiroyoshi Matsuda (JPN)	7/1
9	1¼	Twice Over (GB)	6	Tom Queally	Henry Cecil (GB)	2/1 fav
10	nk	Prince Bishop (IRE)	4	Ahmed Ajtebi	Saeed bin Suroor (GB/UAE)	25/1
11	2¼	Golden Sword (GB)	5	K. Shea	Mike de Kock (SAF)	12/1
12	½	Richard's Kid (USA)	6	Richard Mullen	Satish Seemar (UAE)	50/1
13	12	Fly Down (USA)	4	Julien Leparoux	Nick Zito (USA)	25/1
14	1¼	Poet's Voice (GB)	4	Frankie Dettori	Saeed bin Suroor (GB/UAE)	11/1

- Abbreviations: nse = nose; nk = neck; shd = head; hd = head; nk = neck

== Winner's details ==
Further details of the winner, Victoire Pisa

- Sex: Colt
- Foaled: 31 March 2007
- Country: Japan
- Sire: Neo Universe; Dam: Whitewater Affair (Machiavellian)
- Owner: Yoshimi Ichikawa
- Breeder: Shadai Farm
