= Jeweler (horse) =

Japanese Thoroughbred racehorse

Jeweler; ジュエラー
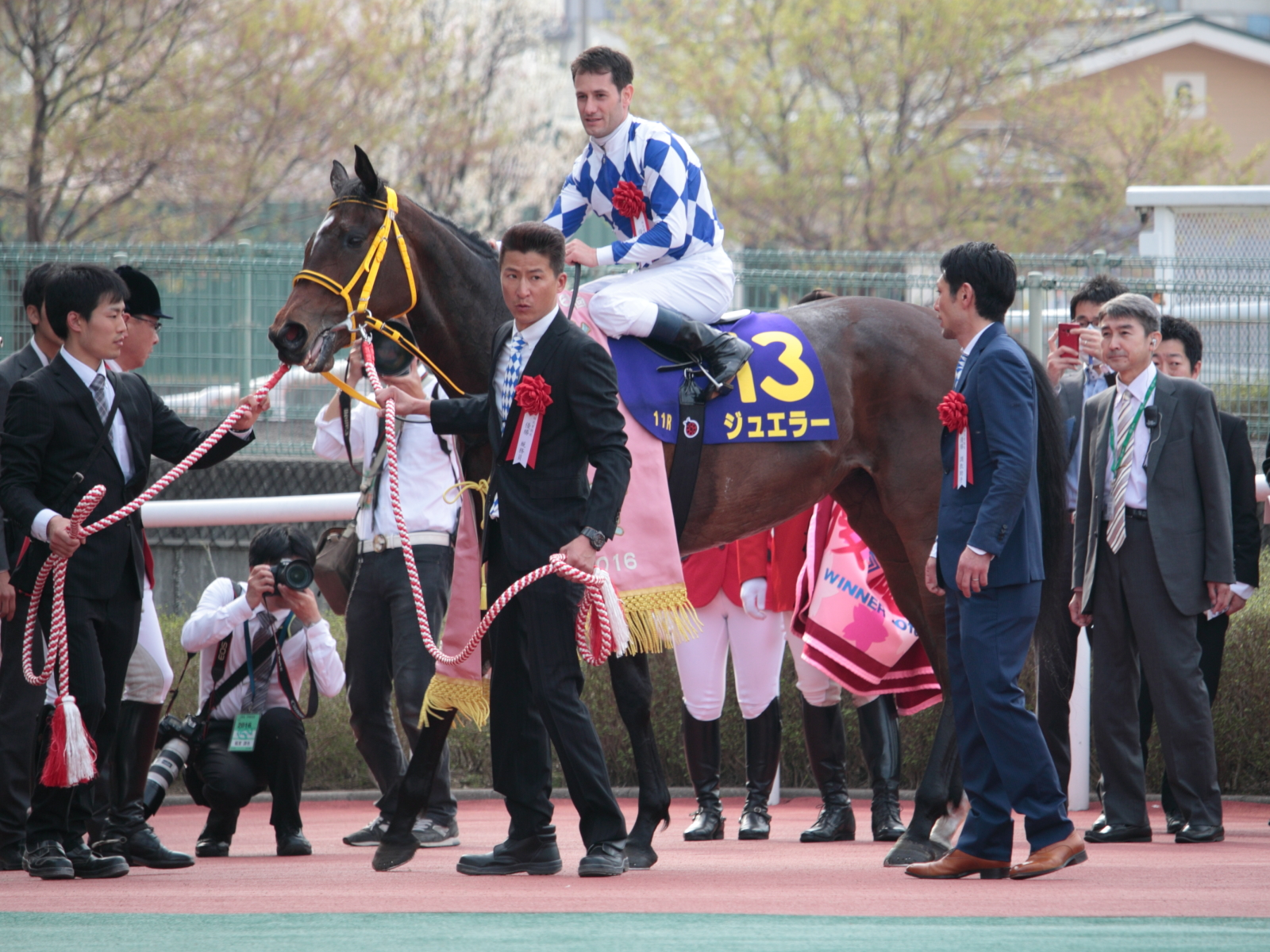
- Jeweler in 2016
- Sire: Victoire Pisa
- Grandsire: Neo Universe
- Dam: Baldwina
- Damsire: Pistolet Bleu
- Sex: Mare
- Foaled: 17 January 2013
- Country: Japan
- Colour: Bay
- Breeder: Shadai Farm
- Owner: Yoichi Aoyama
- Racing colours
- Trainer: Kenichi Fujioka
- Jockey: Mirco Demuro
- Record: 6: 2-2-0
- Earnings: 169,101,000 JPY

Major wins
- Japanese Classic Tiara Race wins: Oka Sho (2016)

Jeweler (Japanese: ジュエラー, foaled 17 January 2013) is a Japanese retired Thoroughbred racehorse and broodmare best known for her win in the 2016 Oka Sho. She won her only start as a juvenile in 2015 and emerged as a top-class performer in the following spring. After finishing a close second in two Grade 3 events, she took the Oka Sho, beating Sinhalite by a nose in a photo-finish. She made only two more appearances, running unplaced in the Rose Stakes and finishing a close fourth in the Shuka Sho.

== Background ==
Jeweler is a bay mare with a large white star bred in Japan by Shadai Farm. During her racing career, she carried the blue and white colours of Yoichi Aoyama and was trained by Kenichi Fujioka. She was ridden in most of her races by the Italian jockey Mirco Demuro.

She was from the first crop of foals sired by Victoire Pisa, whose wins included the Satsuki Shō, Arima Kinen and Dubai World Cup. Jeweler's dam showed high-class form in Europe, winning three of her eight races, including the Prix Penelope in 2001. After being exported to Japan, she became a successful broodmare whose other foals have included the multiple Grade 3 winner One Carat. She was a female-line descendant of the French broodmare Brescia (foaled 1953) who has been the ancestor of many major winners including Anabaa.

== Racing career ==
=== 2015: two-year-old season ===
On 29 November 2015, Jeweler began her track career in a contest for previously unraced juveniles at Kyoto Racecourse. Racing over 1800 metres on firm ground, she won from Admire Kizuna and thirteen others.

=== 2016: three-year-old season ===
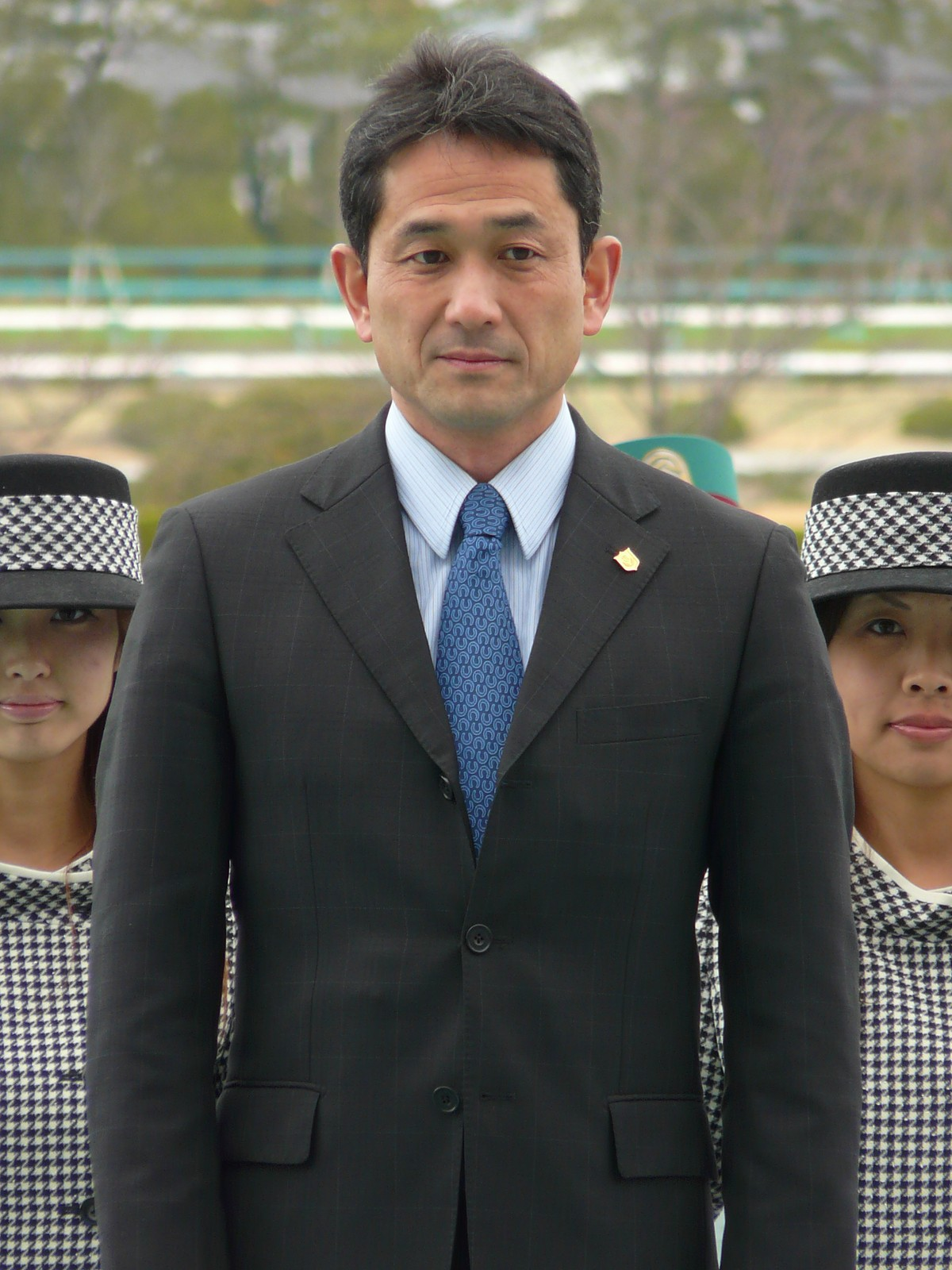
Kenichi Fujioka, who trained Jeweler throughout her racing career

On her three-year-old debut, Jeweler was matched against male opposition in the Grade 3 Shinzan Kinen over 1600 metres at Kyoto on 10 January. Starting the 3.1/1 second favourite in a fifteen-runner field, she finished second to the colt Logi Cry, beaten a neck by the winner. On 5 March she started favourite the Grade 3 Tulip Sho (a major trial race for the Oka Sho) over 1600 metres at Hanshin Racecourse. After leading in the straight, she was caught on the line by the fast-finishing Sinhalite and beaten a nose, the smallest possible official margin. Kenichi Fujioka said that the filly had run well after her two-month layoff and added that he felt that she had been "targeted" by the jockeys of the other runners.

In the Oka Sho at the same track on 10 April, the filly started 4/1, third choice in the betting behind the 2015 juvenile champion Major Emblem, with Sinhalite being made the second favourite. The other fifteen runners, none of whom started at less than 20/1, included Solveig (Fillies' Revue), Blanc Bonheur (Hakodate Nisai Stakes) and Denko Ange (Artemis Stakes). After racing at the rear of the field in the early stages, Jeweler was switched to the wide outside on the final turn and began to make rapid progress in the straight. She reeled in the leaders with a sustained run, caught Sinhalite in the final stride and won by a nose, with At The Seaside and Major Emblem in third and fourth. Fujioka commented "Her conformation tells us that she should suit longer distances so I have high hopes for her to do well in the remaining two legs of the Fillies’ Triple Crown".

Jeweler missed the Yushun Himba through injury and was off the course for more than five months before returning for the Rose Stakes (a major trial for the Shuka Sho) over 1800 metres at Hanshin on 18 September. She started second favourite but ran poorly and came home eleventh of the fifteen runners behind Sinhalite, after which both her trainer and jockey suggested that she had been unsuited by the prevailing heavy ground. In the Shuka Sho at Kyoto Racecourse in October, she produced a much better effort as she finished strongly to take fourth place behind Vivlos, beaten just over a length by the winner. After this race, she was planned to run in the Queen Elizabeth II Cup but withdrew due to the muscle pain in her left hind leg. This injury extended her vacation and worsened over time, as she was diagnosed with a fracture in that leg. The team decided to retire her and cancel her comeback attempt in mid 2017. Jeweler turned into a broodmare at Shadai Farm in Chitose, Hokkaido.

== Racing form ==
Jeweler won two races and finished second twice in six starts. This data is available based on JBIS and netkeiba.

Date	Track	Race	Grade	Distance (Condition)	Entry	HN	Odds (Favored)	Finish	Time	Margins	Jockey	Winner (Runner-up)
2015 – two-year-old season
Nov 29	Kyoto	2yo Newcomer		1,800 m (Firm)	15	3	4.1 (2)	1st	1:48.8	–0.4	Mirco Demuro	(Admire Kizuna)
2016 – three-year-old season
Jan 10	Kyoto	Shinzan Kinen	3	1,600 m (Firm)	18	7	4.1 (2)	2nd	1:34.1	0.0	Mirco Demuro	Logi Cry
Mar 5	Hanshin	Tulip Sho	3	1,600 m (Firm)	16	9	2.0 (1)	2nd	1:32.8	0.0	Mirco Demuro	Sinhalite
Apr 10	Hanshin	Oka Sho	1	1,600 m (Firm)	18	13	5.0 (3)	1st	1:33.4	0.0	Mirco Demuro	(Sinhalite)
Sep 18	Hanshin	Rose Stakes	2	1,800 m (Soft)	15	6	3.7 (2)	11th	1:48.3	1.6	Mirco Demuro	Sinhalite
Oct 16	Kyoto	Shuka Sho	1	2,000 m (Firm)	18	2	3.9 (2)	4th	1:58.8	0.2	Mirco Demuro	Vivlos

Legend:
Turf

== Assessment and awards ==
In the JRA Awards for 2016 Jeweler finished third behind Sinhalite in the voting for the JRA Award for Best Three-Year-Old Filly.

== Pedigree ==
Pedigree of Jeweler (JPN), bay mare 2013
Sire Victoire Pisa (JPN) 2007	Neo Universe (JPN); 2000	Sunday Silence	Halo
Sire Victoire Pisa (JPN) 2007	Neo Universe (JPN); 2000	Sunday Silence	Wishing Well
Sire Victoire Pisa (JPN) 2007	Neo Universe (JPN); 2000	Pointed Path	Kris
Sire Victoire Pisa (JPN) 2007	Neo Universe (JPN); 2000	Pointed Path	Silken Way
Sire Victoire Pisa (JPN) 2007	Whitewater Affair (GB); 1993	Machiavellian	Mr. Prospector
Sire Victoire Pisa (JPN) 2007	Whitewater Affair (GB); 1993	Machiavellian	Coup de Folie
Sire Victoire Pisa (JPN) 2007	Whitewater Affair (GB); 1993	Much Too Risky	Bustino
Sire Victoire Pisa (JPN) 2007	Whitewater Affair (GB); 1993	Much Too Risky	Short Rations
Dam Baldwina (FR) 1998	Pistolet Bleu (IRE); 1988	Top Ville	High Top
Dam Baldwina (FR) 1998	Pistolet Bleu (IRE); 1988	Top Ville	Sega Ville
Dam Baldwina (FR) 1998	Pistolet Bleu (IRE); 1988	Pampa Bella	Armos
Dam Baldwina (FR) 1998	Pistolet Bleu (IRE); 1988	Pampa Bella	Kendie
Dam Baldwina (FR) 1998	Balioka (FR); 1985	Tourangeau	Val de Loir
Dam Baldwina (FR) 1998	Balioka (FR); 1985	Tourangeau	Torbella
Dam Baldwina (FR) 1998	Balioka (FR); 1985	Bangalore	Cadmus
Dam Baldwina (FR) 1998	Balioka (FR); 1985	Bangalore	Balbona (Family: 1-n)
