= Sunday Silence =

American-bred Thoroughbred racehorse (1986–2002)

Sunday Silence サンデーサイレンス
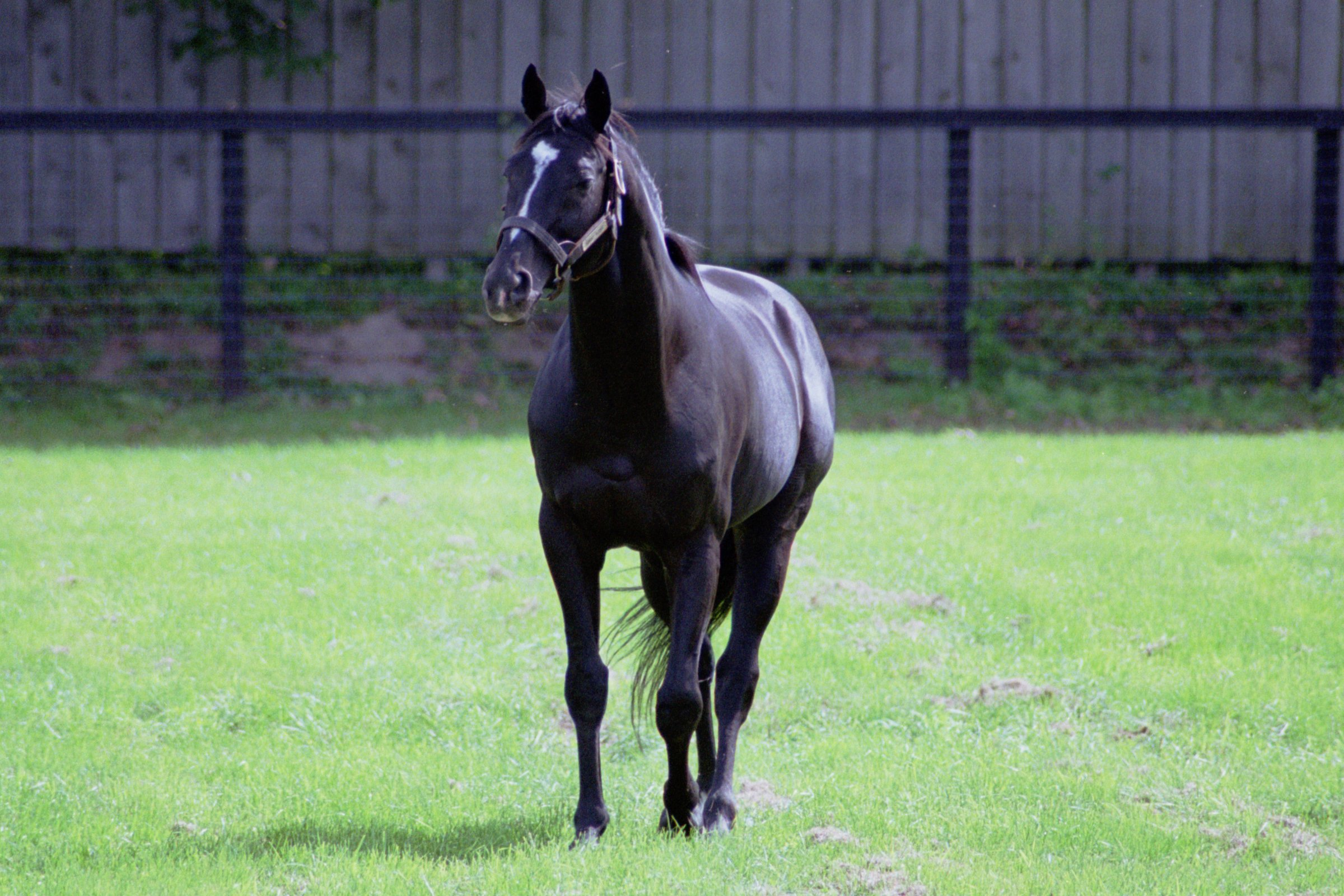
- Sunday Silence at Shadai Stallion Station Hayakita (Abira), Hokkaido, Japan.
- Breed: Thoroughbred
- Sire: Halo (US)
- Grandsire: Hail To Reason (US)
- Dam: Wishing Well (US)
- Damsire: Understanding (US)
- Sex: Stallion
- Foaled: March 25, 1986; Paris, Kentucky, US
- Died: August 19, 2002 (aged 16); Abira, Hokkaido, Japan
- Country: United States
- Color: Black/Brown
- Breeder: Oak Cliff Thoroughbreds, Ltd.
- Owner: H-G-W Partners; Racing colors: Gray, yellow sash, sleeves and cap
- Trainer: Charlie Whittingham
- Record: 14: 9–5–0
- Earnings: $4,968,554

Major wins
- Santa Anita Derby (1989); San Felipe Stakes (1989); Super Derby (1989); Californian Stakes (1990); American Triple Crown wins: Kentucky Derby (1989); Preakness Stakes (1989); Breeders' Cup wins: Breeders' Cup Classic (1989)

Awards
- U.S. Champion 3-Year-Old Colt (1989); United States Horse of the Year (1989); Leading sire in Japan (1995–2007); Leading broodmare sire in Japan (2007–2019); Timeform rating: 137

Honors
- United States Racing Hall of Fame (1996) #31 – Top 100 U.S. Racehorses of the 20th Century; Sunday Silence Stakes in Louisiana Downs

Sunday Silence (Japanese: サンデーサイレンス, Hepburn: Sandee Sairensu; March 25, 1986 – August 19, 2002) was an American-bred Thoroughbred racehorse and sire. In 1989, he won the Kentucky Derby and the Preakness Stakes but failed to complete the Triple Crown when he was defeated in the Belmont Stakes. Nevertheless, he won the Breeders' Cup Classic and was voted American Champion Three-Year-Old Colt and American Horse of the Year that same year. Sunday Silence's racing career was marked by his rivalry with Easy Goer, over whom he had a three to one edge in their head-to-head races. Easy Goer, the 1988 American Champion Two-Year-Old Colt finished second to Sunday Silence in the Kentucky Derby, the Preakness, and the Breeders' Cup Classic. However, Easy Goer prevailed by eight lengths in the Belmont, denying Sunday Silence the Triple Crown. Both horses were later voted into the American Hall of Fame.

After his retirement from racing, Sunday Silence attracted little support by breeders in the United States and was exported to Japan. He was the leading sire in Japan on thirteen occasions, surpassing the previous record of ten titles by Northern Taste. Although the relatively insular nature of Japanese racing at the time meant that Sunday Silence's success was initially restricted to his home territory, his descendants have in recent years won major races in Australia, France, the United Kingdom, Hong Kong, the United States and Dubai. Blood-Horse pedigree expert Anne Peters speculated, "Had Sunday Silence retired in Kentucky, it's almost certain he would have tanked commercially and been exported in disgrace, but he found his perfect gene pool and thrived instead." He would later be the leading broodmare sire in North America in 2016.

In the Blood-Horse magazine List of the Top 100 U.S. Racehorses of the 20th Century, Sunday Silence was ranked #31.

== Early years ==
Sunday Silence was foaled on March 25, 1986, at Stone Farm in Paris, Kentucky. He was sired by Halo out of Wishing Well by Understanding. Though he was registered as a dark bay/brown, he was in fact a true black.

He was bred by Oak Cliff Thoroughbreds, Ltd. and escaped death twice: first as a weanling when he nearly died from a freak virus; and later at age two, traveling in a van when the driver experienced a heart attack and the van flipped over. He was passed over twice at the sales ring as a yearling before he was sold in California for $50,000 as a two-year-old in training. Arthur B. Hancock III bought him as a "buy-back" (he had bred him), hoping to ship him to Kentucky. However, the van accident kept Sunday Silence in California. Hall of Fame trainer Charlie Whittingham bought a half share of the colt and then sold half of that to Ernest Gaillard. (Ownership designate: H-G-W Partners.)

== Ownership ==
H-G-W Partners (Hancock-Gaillard-Whittingham) represents the names of the three partners who owned the horse. The three partners were:

1. Arthur B. Hancock III (1943–2026) – 50% partner, who was a horse breeder and the owner of Stone Farm near Paris, Kentucky.
2. Charlie Whittingham (1913–1999) – 25% partner, who was the horse's Hall of Fame trainer;
3. Ernest Gaillard (1913–2004) – 25% partner, who was a 1938 graduate of the University of Louisville and active in the organizing of the Kentucky Derby, and a medical doctor with the Eighth Army Air Force during World War II.

== Racing record ==
=== 1988: two-year-old season ===
Although Sunday Silence showed ability, he didn't make it to the races until late in his two-year-old season, finishing second in a maiden race, then winning a maiden special weight race and finishing second in an allowance race from three starts.

=== 1989: three-year-old season ===
Sunday Silence began his three-year-old year by winning an allowance race at Santa Anita by four lengths which opened the door of Kentucky Derby potential. His next race was a victory in the Grade 2 San Felipe Stakes, and then he won the G1 Santa Anita Derby by eleven lengths to qualify for a start in the Kentucky Derby.

==== Kentucky Derby ====
In what became an iconic rivalry, Sunday Silence and Easy Goer would only meet four times, the first of which was the 1989 Kentucky Derby on May 6. In the buildup to the 1989 Triple Crown, the rivalry developed between the West Coast-based Sunday Silence and the East Coast-based Easy Goer, winner of the 1988 Eclipse Award for Champion Two Year Old Colt. Easy Goer was coming in off of a victory in the Wood Memorial and a record breaking performance in the Gotham Stakes. Unknown to the public however, Easy Goer had a small crack in his left front. The favorite was Easy Goer, with Sunday Silence as the 3:1 second choice.

Kentucky Derby day was a cold one at 44°, the coldest in 72 years, with rain creating a slow muddy track. After stalking the pace and making his move around the turn, Sunday Silence and jockey Pat Valenzuela defeated Easy Goer by 2 1/2 lengths, in the slowest time (2:05) for a Kentucky Derby since 1958. Sunday Silence ducked in and out sharply throughout the stretch run, with his jockey switching from left and right handed urging trying to keep him running straight. Even with ducking in and out, the champion Easy Goer was unable to make up ground. Daily Racing Form writer Dan Illman stated after Sunday Silence's victory that "the best horse won that afternoon." Daily Racing Form chairman Steve Crist stated his opinion that "Easy Goer had a legitimate explanation for his defeat, as he didn't handle the muddy Churchill track."

==== Preakness Stakes ====
While both horses were preparing for the 1 3/16-mile Preakness two weeks after the Derby, each had minor ailments. Sunday Silence came up lame after a gallop seven days before the race. Trainer Whittingham contacted well-known Kentucky veterinarian Alex Harthill, who diagnosed a bruise under the sole, a common injury that "wasn't a serious problem but it had happened at a serious time." Harthill had Sunday Silence step on a clean sheet of white paper which was subsequently faxed to Ric Redden of Lexington, Kentucky, and from which Redden prepared a set of aluminum bar shoes. Redden and his assistant then flew via rented jet to Baltimore with the bar shoes and X-ray machine to confirm that no fracture was involved. After the shoes were fitted, Sunday Silence resumed training four days before the race. After his connections saw the colt's "remarkably" rapid recovery from the injury, the bar shoes were removed the day before the race. With all the uncertainty over Sunday Silence's soundness, he would go on to be second choice once again to Easy Goer at 2:1.

Meanwhile, unknown to the public at his rival's stable, throughout Preakness week (as late as Friday, the day before the race), Easy Goer's front feet were being soaked in tubs of Epsom salts due to small scratches or cracks on both heels. An ultrasound was also performed on his ankles and knees. Some wondered if these ailments could compromise the chances of both horses. Easy Goer had "problematic, puffy" ankles that he dealt with throughout his career.

The 1989 Preakness Stakes on May 20 is one that continues to live in racing lore as one of the best races ever run, and one of the most iconic stretch duels. It was added into Horse Racing's Top 100 Moments, placing at #70. Easy Goer broke slow, and Sunday Silence was bumped at the start, then the pair settled into their sports. After three-quarters of a mile, Day guided Easy Goer to the front where Sunday Silence dug in and went with him. The legendary stretch duel was fought the entire length of the stretch, with neither Sunday Silence or Easy Goer giving an inch. Sunday Silence prevailed in the photo finish, with a finishing time of 1:53 4/5, the third fastest Preakness at the time.

Some Easy Goer loyalists in the media maintained their horse's superiority, attributing the loss to the fact that Easy Goer had leapt in the air at the start and his jockey, Pat Day, reined Easy Goer's head to the right when he had a short lead in the home stretch. Day, who lodged a failed objection against Valenzuela, has called his ride "a mistake."

==== Belmont Stakes ====
In 1989, New York was the only state in America that banned all race-day drugs and medications, including the now-commonly used medication Lasix. In the three weeks between the Preakness and Belmont, Whittingham was angered that the controversial veterinarian Alex Harthill, who treated Sunday Silence earlier for the Kentucky Derby and Preakness, was not licensed in New York and prohibited from practicing. The day before the 1 1/2-mile Belmont Stakes, Sunday Silence, with exercise rider Pam Mabes up, was spooked and kicked trainer Whittingham in the temple, a glancing blow that came close to killing the trainer.

Belmont Park received several inches of rain in the days leading up to the race, but by race day on June 10 the track was rated fast with Sunday Silence this time the 4:5 post time favorite, and the entry of Easy Goer and Awe Inspiring at 8:5. While initially planning on going to the lead, Sunday Silence settled into second behind the longshot French colt Le Voyageur. Easy Goer was never too far behind either. When Sunday Silence made his move on the turn, Easy Goer made a faster one and swept to the front. Easy Goer defeated Sunday Silence by eight lengths in the time of 2:26, producing the second-fastest Belmont Stakes in history, behind only Secretariat, and denied Sunday Silence the Triple Crown, and thus a $5M bonus. However, by virtue of his two Classic wins and his runner-up performance, Sunday Silence was awarded the third $1,000,000 Visa Triple Crown Bonus for best three-year-old in the series.

==== Breeders' Cup Classic ====
After the Belmont Stakes, the pair went their separate ways with Sunday Silence returning to California where he finished second to eventual Breeders' Cup Turf winner Prized in the Grade II 1 1/4-mile Swaps Stakes at Hollywood Park on July 23. From there he went to Louisiana Downs where he won the Grade I Super Derby on September 24, giving him six weeks' rest going into the Breeder's Cup Classic. Over in New York, Easy Goer won 4 successive Grade I stakes after the Belmont... the Whitney Handicap, Travers Stakes, Woodward Stakes, and the Jockey Club Gold Cup, giving him 27 days' rest going into the Classic.

This set up one final face-off between the rivals at the season-ending $3 million 1 1/4-mile Breeders' Cup Classic at Gulfstream Park, on November 4. The contest was expected to decide the winner of the Eclipse Award for Horse of the Year. Sunday Silence's jockey Pat Valenzuela had earlier been suspended for cocaine use and was replaced by Hall of Fame rider Chris McCarron. Sunday Silence was the post time 2:1 second choice behind Easy Goer at 1:2.

The race started as usual for Sunday Silence who settled five lengths behind the leader, but Easy Goer broke slow and was 11 lengths from the front for much of the race. On the backstretch, Sunday Silence inched closer to the lead with Easy Goer noticeably and suddenly getting into stride with three quarters of a mile to go, with track announcer Tom Durkin commenting during the race "he is five lengths behind Sunday Silence and now he's beginning to roll!" and near the half mile pole he continued, "Sunday Silence bracing for the oncoming power of Easy Goer, who's right at his neck!" On the turn however, Sunday Silence continued to gain on the leader, leaving Easy Goer behind. Sunday Silence took control with about an eighth of a mile to go, with Easy Goer three lengths behind. Jockey Chris McCarron continued with a hand ride, and was able to withstand a strong late charge by Easy Goer to win the Classic by a neck. The victory solidified a 3:1 advantage in Sunday Silence's favor.

At this point, Sunday Silence had earned what was then a single-season record $4.59 million and won seven times in nine starts for the 1989 campaign, earning him Eclipse Award for Outstanding 3-Year-Old Male Horse and Horse of the Year honors. For the latter award, Sunday Silence received 223 of 242 votes, making him the most decisive winner since John Henry eight years earlier. Even with the championship honors, debate continues decades after their careers on who was the better horse.

=== 1990: four-year-old season ===
At the age of four, Sunday Silence won the Californian and placed second in the Hollywood Gold Cup behind Criminal Type by a head, while giving away 5 pounds. He suffered an injured ligament that eventually led to his retirement. Out of 14 career races, he had 9 wins (including 6 Grade 1s) and 5 runner-up finishes.

=== Accomplishments ===
In 1996, Sunday Silence was inducted into the National Museum of Racing and Hall of Fame. He was ranked #31 in the Bloodhorse Top 100 Horses of the 20th Century, while Easy Goer ranked #34. Blood-Horse stated that its rankings "will generate debate for years to come." The electoral friction was ultimately reflected in the introduction to the Blood-Horse's "Top 100 Racehorses" book, which said, "For all the work and dreaming that went into it... one approaches the list... with a nagging sense of its folly as a rational exercise and of the maddening arbitrariness of its outcome. However, one views this list of horses, whether in peace and contentment—or shock and dismay—all such judgments, of course, are entirely subjective, a mixture of whim, wisdom, and whatever prejudices howl through the back of the mind."

Since the Breeders’ Cup Classic was instituted in 1984, Alysheba and Sunday Silence were the only two horses to win three legs of a four-race sequence that was defined in 2015 as the Grand Slam of Thoroughbred racing: The Triple Crown races, plus the Breeders' Cup Classic, and Sunday Silence was the first horse to win three legs of the modern Grand Slam in the same year. As the Breeders' Cup began after the 1978 Triple Crown win of Affirmed, the potential for a sweep of all four races only became possible in 1984, and did not occur until 2015 when American Pharoah won the Triple Crown and eventually the Grand Slam.

== Stud record ==
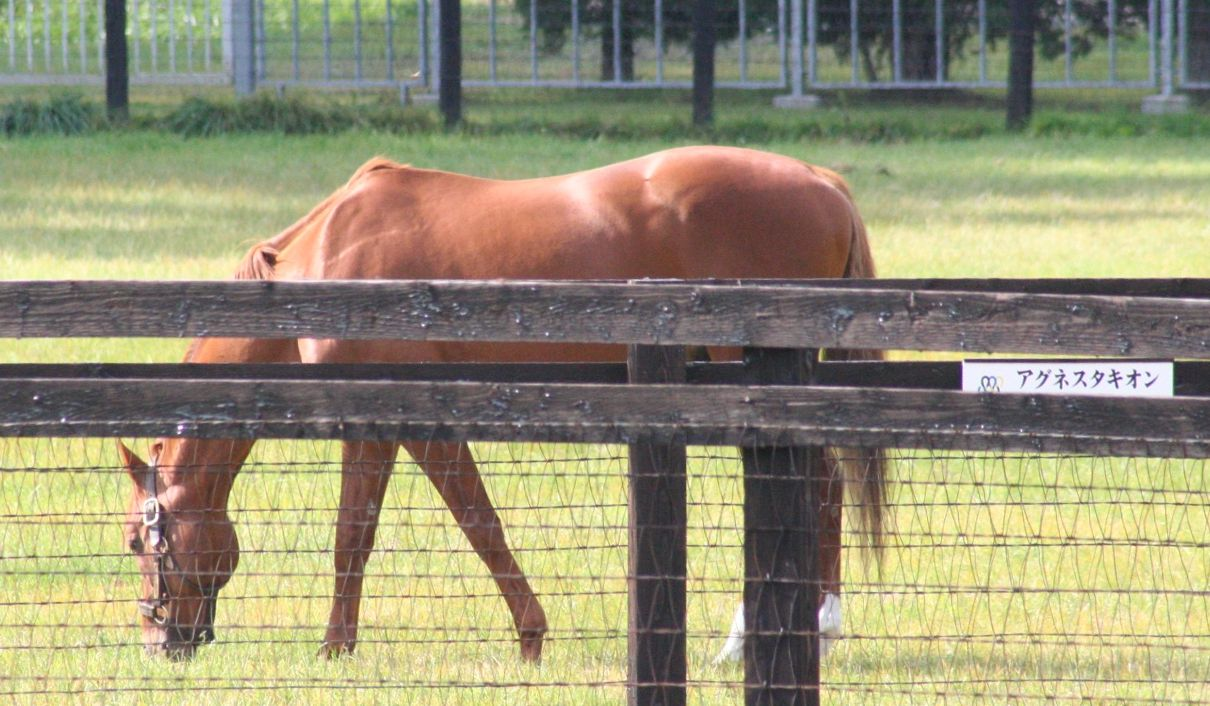
Agnes Tachyon, one of Sunday Silence's foals, that built a large reputation of its own in the Japanese horse racing industry.

Sunday Silence was sold to Japanese breeder Zenya Yoshida, to stand at his Shadai Stallion Station in Shiraoi, Hokkaido. Yoshida had acquired a 25% interest in Sunday Silence early in his 4-year-old season and bought out the other partners for $7.5 million in 1991.

Sunday Silence flourished in Japan and became their leading sire from 1995 through 2007, taking over from Northern Taste (ten-time leading sire in Japan). He was particularly successful with daughters from the Northern Dancer sire line. However, breeders were generally not successful expanding his influence outside of Japan. His progeny have won many races in Japan, including 20 out of 22 JRA Grade 1 flat races (the only exceptions are the NHK Mile Cup and the Japan Cup Dirt). His progeny also have won International Grade 1 race including the Hong Kong Vase, Hong Kong Mile and Dubai Sheema Classic.

Additionally noteworthy about Sunday Silence during this time was a close bond he would form with fellow stallion Mejiro McQueen, who acted as a calming influence towards him. The two were noted for being best friends, and were sometimes jokingly referred to as "lovers" by racing fans and farm hands alike, despite both of them being stallions. However, their bloodlines would eventually merge when Sunday Silence's son, Stay Gold, mated with Mejiro McQueen's daughters, such as Point Flag and Oriental Art. This specific nick, known as the "Golden Combination", produced highly successful racehorses such as Dream Journey, Orfevre, and Gold Ship.

Descendants of Sunday Silence have broken many earnings records, in part because he was active at the start of the "big crop" era (siring about 2000 foals) and also because the average purses in Japan are significantly higher than the rest of the world. Conservative estimates on the earnings of Sunday Silence descendants place the total near JPY 80 billion (approximately $730 million according to Equibase).

He was also the leading broodmare sire in North America in 2016 with Japanese racehorse Lani's entry in the Kentucky Derby that year with a Grade II win in Dubai, followed by off the board finishes in the Derby and Preakness, and a third-place finish in the Belmont. Once qualified to appear on the broodmare sire list, Sunday Silence then got enhancements from his Japanese runners, where there is a substantial disproportion between North American purses and the significantly higher purses in Japan.

=== Major winners ===
c = colt, f = filly

Grade one winners
Foaled	Name	Sex	Major wins
1992	Dance Partner	f	Yūshun Himba, Queen Elizabeth II Cup
1992	Fuji Kiseki	c	Asahi Hai Sansai Stakes
1992	Genuine	c	Satsuki Shō, Mile Championship
1992	Marvelous Sunday	c	Takarazuka Kinen
1992	Tayasu Tsuyoshi	c	Tokyo Yūshun
1993	Bubble Gum Fellow	c	Asahi Hai Sansai Stakes, Tennō Shō (Autumn)
1993	Dance in the Dark	c	Kikuka Shō
1993	Ishino Sunday	c	Satsuki Shō
1994	Silence Suzuka	c	Takarazuka Kinen
1994	Stay Gold	c	Dubai Sheema Classic, Hong Kong Vase
1995	Special Week	c	Tokyo Yūshun, Tennō Shō (Spring and Autumn), Japan Cup
1996	Admire Vega	c	Tokyo Yūshun
1996	Stinger	f	Hanshin Sansai Himba Stakes
1996	To the Victory	f	Queen Elizabeth II Cup
1997	Agnes Flight	c	Tokyo Yūshun
1997	Air Shakur	c	Satsuki Shō, Kikuka Shō
1997	Cheers Grace	f	Oka Shō
1998	Agnes Tachyon	c	Satsuki Shō
1998	Believe	f	Sprinters Stakes, Takamatsunomiya Kinen
1998	Manhattan Cafe	c	Kikuka Shō, Arima Kinen, Tennō Shō (Spring)
1998	Mejiro Bailey	c	Asahi Hai Sansai Stakes
1999	Admire Max	c	Takamatsunomiya Kinen
1999	Durandal	c	Sprinters Stakes, Mile Championship (twice)
1999	Gold Allure	c	February Stakes
1999	Sunday Joy	f	Australian Oaks
2000	Admire Groove	f	Queen Elizabeth II Cup (twice)
2000	Heavenly Romance	f	Tennō Shō (Autumn)
2000	Neo Universe	c	Satsuki Shō, Tokyo Yūshun
2000	Orewa Matteruze	c	Takamatsunomiya Kinen
2000	Peace of World	f	Hanshin Juvenile Fillies
2000	Still in Love	f	Japanese Triple Tiara (Oka Shō, Yūshun Himba, Shūka Shō)
2000	Zenno Rob Roy	c	Tennō Shō (Autumn), Japan Cup, Arima Kinen
2001	Daiwa El Cielo	f	Yūshun Himba
2001	Daiwa Major	c	Satsuki Shō, Tennō Shō (Autumn), Mile Championship (twice), Yasuda Kinen
2001	Dance in the Mood	f	Oka Shō
2001	Hat Trick	c	Mile Championship, Hong Kong Mile
2001	Heart's Cry	c	Arima Kinen, Dubai Sheema Classic
2001	Suzuka Mambo	c	Tennō Shō (Spring)
2002	Air Messiah	f	Shūka Shō
2002	Deep Impact	c	Japanese Triple Crown (Satsuki Shō, Tokyo Yūshun, Kikuka Shō), Tennō Shō (Spring), Takarazuka Kinen, Japan Cup, Arima Kinen
2002	Shonan Peintre	f	Hanshin Juvenile Fillies
2002	Suzuka Phoenix	c	Takamatsunomiya Kinen
2003	Fusaichi Pandora	f	Queen Elizabeth II Cup
2003	Matsurida Gogh	c	Arima Kinen

Other winners
Foaled	Name	Sex	Major wins
1992	Bright Sunday	m	1995 Sapphire Stakes
1992	Prime Stage	m	1994 Sapporo Sansai Stakes
1992	Magic Kiss	m	1996 Kitakyushu Kinen
1992	Daitaku Surgeon	c	1996 Osaka Jo Stakes
1992	Silent Happiness	m	1995 Sankei Sports Sho Yonsai Himba Tokubetsu
1992	Sunday Well	c	1995 St Lite Kinen
1992	Summer Suspicion	c	1995 Aoba Sho
1992	King of Daiya	c	1997 Nakayama Kinen
1993	Rosen Kavalier	c	1997 American Jockey Club Cup
1993	Royal Touch	c	1996 Kisaragi Sho
1993	Silent Hunter	c	1999 Sankei Osaka Hai
1993	Sakura Keizan O	c	'96 Choshi Tokubetsu
1993	She's Grace	m	1995 Fuyo Stakes
1993	Sericite Dandy	c	1997 TUF Hai
1993	Hornet Pierce	m	1998 Sumidagawa Tokubetsu
1994	Big Sunday	c	1998 Yomiuri Milers Cup
1994	Waltz Dancer	m	1999 Ichikawa Stakes
1994	Air Wings	m	1997 Hanshin Himba Tokubetsu
1994	Orange Peel	m	1997 Sankei Sports Sho Yonsai Himba Tokubetsu
1995	Meisho Odo	c	2000 Sankei Osaka Hai
1995	Divine Light	c	2000 TV Yamanashi Hai
1995	Jo Big Bang	c	1999 Hakodate Kinen
1995	Tayasu Again	c	1998 Aoba Sho
1995	Egao o Misete	m	1998 Hanshin Himba Tokubetsu
1996	Chokai Ryoga	c	2003 May Stakes
1996	T.M.Sunday	c	2003 Silk Road Stakes
1996	Rosado	c	2002 Sankei Sho All Comers
1996	Maruka Candy	m	2001 Fuchu Himba Stakes
1996	Fusaichi Airedale	m	1999 Hochi Hai Yonsai Himba Tokubetsu
1996	Black Tuxedo	c	1999 St Lite Kinen
1996	Painted Black	c	1999 Stayers Stakes
1996	Thrilling Sunday	c	2001 Narutaki Tokubetsu
1996	Eishin Rudens	m	2001 Nakayama Himba Stakes
1996	Kiss Me Tender	c	2003 Dotombori Stakes
1996	Saikyo Sunday	c	1999 Chunichi Sports Sho Yonsai Stakes
1996	Silent Cruise	c	2002 AM Kobe Sho Chushun Tokubetsu
1996	Silent Honor	f	2001 Cherry Hinton Stakes
1996	Sunday Picnic	f	1999 Prix Cléopâtre
1997	Yamanin Respect	c	2002 Hakodate Kinen
1997	Yukino Sun Royal	c	2005 Nikkei Sho
1997	Future Sunday	m	2000 Queen Cup
1997	Meisho Dominica	g	2003 Fukushima Kinen
1997	Nihon Pillow Neil	c	2002 Murasaki Sho
1997	New England	c	2001 STV Hai
1997	Bailarina	m	2000 Sweetpea Stakes
1997	Fusaichi Zenon	c	2000 Yayoi Sho
1997	Tokai Oza	c	2001 Copa Republica Argentina
1997	Admire Boss	c	2000 St Lite Kinen
1997	Apatheia	c	2003 Hayama Tokubetsu
1997	Win Marvelous	c	2003 Kyoto High Jump
1997	Ammirare	c	2001 Keyaki Stakes
1998	Royal Cancer	c	2003 NST Open
1998	Millennium Bio	c	2002 Yomiuri Milers Cup
1998	Miscast	c	2001 Principal Stakes
1998	Trust Fire	c	2001 Radio Tampa Sho
1998	Noblesse Oblige	m	2003 Emerald Stakes
1998	Happy Path	m	2003 Kyoto Himba Stakes
1998	Hallelujah Sunday	c	Fukushima TV Open
1998	Dark Wizard	g	2002 Inari Tokubetsu
1998	Diamond Biko	m	2002 Sankei Sports Hai Hanshin Himba Stakes
1998	Daiwa Rogue	m	2000 Niigata Sansai Stakes
1998	Cheers Brightly	c	2003 Keihan Hai
1998	Sunrise Pegasus	c	2005 Mainichi Okan
1998	Seiko Sunday	c	2002 Spica Stakes
1998	Coin Toss	c	2002 Shirafuji Stakes
1998	Admire Rich	m	2005 Miyabi Stakes
1998	Isao Heat	c	2004 Kanetsu Stakes
1998	Win Radius	c	2004 Keio Hai Spring Cup
1998	Agnes Gold	c	2001 Spring Stakes
1999	Monopole	c	2006 Tomoe Sho
1999	Monopolizer	c	2002 Port Island Stakes
1999	Yamanin Seraphim	c	2002 Keisei Hai
1999	Pop Jewel	m	2004 TUF Hai
1999	Tosen Humming	c	2004 Abukuma Tokubetsu
1999	Hustler	c	2004 Banshun Stakes
1999	Bash Earth	g	2004 Hakuryo Memorial
1999	Tiger Cafe	c	2007 April Stakes
1999	Daiwa Raiders	c	2005 Tanabata Sho
1999	Cheers Stark	c	2002 Kyodo Tsushin Hai
1999	Chapel Concert	m	2004 Yonago Stakes
1999	Chokai Flight	c	2006 Oguninuma Tokubetsu
1999	Shinin' Ruby	m	2002 Queen Cup
1999	Win Duel	c	2004 Onuma Stakes
1999	Emerald Isle	m	2004 Shiranui Tokubetsu
1999	Er Nova	m	2004 HTB Hai
2000	Vita Rosa	m	2003 St Lite Kinen
2000	Reminiscence	m	2005 Tsukioka Tokubetsu
2000	Black Cafe	c	2006 Uzuki Stakes
2000	Tokai Elite	c	2006 Orion Stakes
2000	Dancing On	c	2004 Mr. C.B. Memorial
2000	Danuta	f	2003 UAE Oaks
2000	Cheers Message	m	2005 Kyoto Himba Stakes
2000	Cheerful Smile	m	2006 Keeneland Cup
2000	Chunyi	m	2003 Queen Cup
2000	T M Tanrai	c	2007 Tajima Stakes
2000	Super Chance	c	2006 Umeda Stakes
2000	Starry Heaven	m	2004 Utopia Stakes
2000	Spicule	c	2004 Betelguise Stakes
2000	Silent Deal	c	2003 Musashino Stakes
2000	Sakura President	c	2003 Sapporo Kinen
2000	Superieure	m	2005 Takaragaike Tokubetsu
2000	Catch the Gold	m	2005 Awaji Tokubetsu
2000	Quiet Day	c	2007 March Stakes
2000	Alfajores	c	2006 Kintei Stakes
2000	Albireo	c	2005 Okabe Yukio Kishu Intai Kinen
2001	Vril	c	2004 Ireland Trophy
2001	Valparaiso	m	2004 Mimosa Sho
2001	Wadi Rum	m	2006 Yonago Stakes
2001	Lord Marshal	c	2004 Fukujuso Tokubetsu
2001	Lady in Black	m	2004 Anemone Stakes
2001	Legolas	c	2008 Ryogoku Tokubetsu
2001	Les Clefs d'Or	m	2004 Rose Stakes
2001	Ribbon Art	m	2006 Suzaku Stakes
2001	Rikiai Silence	c	2007 October Stakes
2001	Meteor Burst	c	2003 Icho Stakes
2001	Mejiro Nicolas	g	2005 Shikotsuko Tokubetsu
2001	Meisho Ho O	c	2007 Naigai Times Hai
2001	Mystic Age	c	2004 Komakusa Sho
2001	Mile de Paris	m	2007 Asuka Stakes
2001	Maino Chikara	m	2006 Chushu Tokubetsu
2001	Beluga	c	2008 Shumbo Stakes
2001	Pretty Princess	m	2006 Kuta Tokubetsu
2001	Plasma	c	2005 Oguninuma Tokubetsu
2001	Black Tide	c	2004 Spring Stakes
2001	French Idea	m	2005 Hita Tokubetsu
2001	Firenze	c	2006 Suma Tokubetsu
2001	Fine Cela	m	2006 Moiwayaka Tokubetsu
2001	Pisa no Kukai	c	2004 Principal Stakes
2001	Hikaru Dokisei	m	2004 Tokai Teio Memorial
2001	Higher Game	c	2004 TV Aoba Sho
2001	Sundrop	f	2005 Cardinal Handicap, 2005 Princess Elizabeth Stakes
2001	Dolce Limone	m	2004 Wasurenagusa Sho
2001	Stratagem	c	2004 Sakaiminato Tokubetsu
2001	Swift Current	c	2006 Kokura Kinen
2001	Sunday Stream	g	2005 Shin Hakodate Shi Tanjo Kinen
2001	Silence Gold	g	2005 Aoshima Tokubetsu
2001	Gorgeous Dinner	c	2006 Dannoura Tokubetsu
2001	Great Journey	c	2006 Lord Derby Challenge Trophy
2001	Kyowa Roaring	c	2007 Kitakyushu Kinen
2001	Kyowa Splendor	c	2003 Clover Sho
2001	Capital Flight	c	2006 Yokote Tokubetsu
2001	Air Shady	c	2008 American Jockey Club Cup
2001	Admire Big	c	2003 Tokyo Sports Hai Nisai Stakes
2001	Azuma Sanders	m	2005 Kyoto Himba Stakes
2002	Layman	c	2005 Sovereign Stakes
2002	Lofty Aim	m	2006 Fukushima Himba Stakes
2002	Lord Anthem	c	2006 Senriyama Tokubetsu
2002	Rosenkreuz	c	2007 Kinko Sho
2002	Rhett Butler	c	2008 TV U Fukushima Sho
2002	Raise Your Dream	c	2006 Enoshima Tokubetsu
2002	Race Pilot	m	2005 Mimoza Sho
2002	Yamanin Ariel	m	2007 Okazaki Tokubetsu
2002	Megaton Cafe	c	2005 Oriental Sho
2002	Meisho Ote	c	2006 Kotobuki stakes
2002	Maruka Sieg	c	2006 Ogori Tokubetsu
2002	Machikane Kirara	c	2006 April Stakes
2002	Machikane Aura	c	2006 Chukyo Kinen
2002	Bonaparte	g	2005 Soma Tokubetsu
2002	Daring Heart	f	2005 Queen Stakes
2002	Penny Whistle	m	2005 Sapporo Nikkan Sports Hai
2002	Peer Gynt	c	2004 Daily Hai Nisai Stakes
2002	Princess Lucita	m	2007 Nayabashi Stakes
2002	Princess Grace	m	2005 Kitano Tokubetsu
2002	Principe del Sol	c	2008 Nishigo Tokubetsu
2002	Silent Name	c	2006 Arcadia Handicap, 2007 Commonwealth Breeders' Cup Stakes
2002	Brave Heart	c	2008 Abukuma Stakes
2002	Pisa no Patek	c	2009 UHB Hai
2002	Pixie Dust	m	2008 Uzushio Stakes
2002	Passional Dance	m	2006 Yamakunigawa Tokubetsu
2002	Perfect Match	m	2005 Haramachi Tokubetsu
2002	Hulk Banyan	c	2007 Isezaki Tokubetsu
2002	New York Cafe	c	2006 Yunokawa Tokubetsu
2002	Tokai Wild	c	2007 Nikkei Shinshun Hai
2002	Dia de la Novia	m	2005 Flora Stakes
2002	Dantsu Kitcho	c	2005 Aoba Sho
2002	Double Timpani	c	2007 Orion Stakes
2002	Soldier's Song	c	2008 Okutama Stakes
2002	Jadeite	m	2005 Wasurenagusa Sho
2002	Six Sense	c	2006 Kyoto Kinen
2002	Thanks a Lot	m	2007 Seibunikkan Sports Hai
2002	Samurai Heart	c	2005 Doncaster Cup
2002	King's Trail	c	2005 St Lite Kinen
2002	Eishin Lighten	c	2006 Boso Tokubetsu
2002	Air Sabbath	c	2006 Kiyotaki Tokubetsu
2002	Ibuki Revolution	c	2005 Yukiyanagi Sho
2002	African Beat	c	2007 Rokusha Tokubetsu
2002	Admire Japan	c	2005 Keisei Hai
2002	Agnes Treasure	c	2008 Murasaki Sho
2003	Russell Barows	c	2006 Higashiyama Tokubetsu
2003	Maruka Shenck	c	2005 Daily Hai Nisai Stakes
2003	Magic Hour	g	2006 Atago Tokubetsu
2003	Fusaichi Junk	c	2006 Wakagoma Stakes
2003	Hagino Princess	m	2008 Akanko Tokubetsu
2003	Nirvana	c	2008 Kokura Nikkei Open
2003	Trophy Deal	c	2008 Biwako Tokubetsu
2003	Tosen Shana O	c	2006 St Lite Kinen
2003	Tudor Rose	c	2007 Sakurayama Tokubetsu
2003	Chokai Sunday	c	2006 Zao Tokubetsu
2003	Tagano Eiger	c	2007 Mino Tokubetsu
2003	Saint Victoire	m	2006 Elfin Stakes
2003	King Arthur	c	2008 Koto Stakes
2003	Captain Vega	c	2008 Sekigahara Stakes
2003	F Seiko	c	2006 Wakatake Sho
2003	Eterno	g	2009 Sakaiminato Tokubetsu
2003	Air Magdalene	m	2007 Kamomejima Tokubetsu
2003	Win Legend	c	2006 Aoi Stakes
2003	Admire Main	c	2006 Aoba Sho
2003	Admire Kiss	m	2006 Rose Stakes
2003	Axion	c	2010 Nakayama Kimpai

=== Sire of sires and broodmares ===
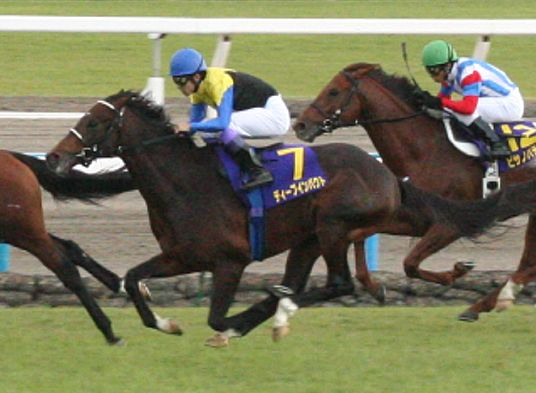
Deep Impact winning Kikuka Sho 2005 on October 23

Many of Sunday Silence's sons have gone on to become successful breeding stallions, with at least seventeen of them siring Group or Grade I winners. These include:

- Fuji Kiseki sired Kane Hekili, Straight Girl, Sun Classique (Dubai Sheema Classic) and Isla Bonita.
- Dance in the Dark sired Delta Blues, the winner of Australia's Melbourne Cup.
- Stay Gold sired Orfevre, Gold Ship, Dream Journey, Nakayama Festa, Fenomeno, Oju Chosan, Red Reveur (Hanshin Juvenile Fillies), Admire Lead (Victoria Mile), Rainbow Line, Win Bright and Indy Champ. Orfevre in turn sired Marche Lorraine, Lucky Lilac, Juryoku Pierrot and Ushba Tesoro, while Gold Ship sired Uberleben, Meiner Grand (Nakayama Daishogai), and Meisho Tabaru.
- Agnes Gold sired Silence Is Gold, Abu Dhabi, Mais Que Bonita, Abidjan, Antonella Baby, Ivar, Energia Fribby, Hevea, Honra Real, Nathan, Olympic Kremlin, Culo e Camicia, Olympic Jhonsnow, Orfeu Negro, Olympic Las Palmas, Janelle Monae, In Love, Online, Look Of Love, No Fear, Doutor Sureño and Neverwalkalone.
- Divine Light sired Natagora.
- Special Week sired Gold Blitz (Teio Sho), Roman Legend (Tokyo Daishōten), Toho Jackal (Kikuka Sho), Buena Vista (Hashin Juvenile Fillies, Oka Sho, Yūshun Himba, Victoria Mile, Japan Cup, Tenno Sho Autumn, ) and Cesario (American Oaks, Yūshun Himba) ; who in turn foaled Epiphaneia (Kikuka Sho, Japan Cup), Leontes (Asahi Hai Futurity Stakes), and Saturnalia (Hopeful Stakes, Satsuki Sho). Epiphaneia would then go on to sire Daring Tact (Oka Sho, Yushun Himba, Shuka Sho), Efforia (Satsuki Sho, Tenno Sho Autumn, Arima Kinen), Ten Happy Rose (Victoria Mile), Circle of Life (Hanshin Juvenile Fillies), Blow the Horn (Takarazuka Kinen), Stellenbosch (Oka Sho) and Danon Decile (Tokyo Yushun, Dubai Sheema Classic). Leontes would go on to sire T O Royal (Tenno Sho Spring) and Museum Mile (Satsuki Sho, Arima Kinen). Saturnalia would go on to sire Cavallerizzo (Asahi Hai Futurity Stakes) and Rodeo Drive (NHK Mile Cup). Special Week is also the damsire of Deirdre (Shuka Sho, Nassau Stakes), Mikki Fight (JBC Classic, Teio Sho [Twice]) and Jun Light Bolt (Champions Cup).
- Manhattan Cafe sired Grape Brandy (February Stakes), Hiruno d'Amour (Tenno Sho), Jo Cappuccino (NHK Mile Cup), Red Desire and Queens Ring (Queen Elizabeth II Commemorative Cup).
- Agnes Tachyon sired Logic (NHK Mile Cup), Daiwa Scarlet (Oka Sho, Shuka Sho, Queen Elizabeth II Commemorative Cup, Arima Kinen), Deep Sky (NHK Mile Cup, Tokyo Yushun), Captain Thule (Satsuki Sho), Little Amapola (Queen Elizabeth II Cup) and Reve d'Essor.
- Neo Universe sired Unrivaled (Satsuki Shō), Logi Universe, Victoire Pisa, and Neorealism. Victoire Pisa in turn sired the Oka Sho winner Jeweler.
- Zenno Rob Roy sired Saint Emilion (Yūshun Himba)
- Daiwa Major sired Curren Black Hill (NHK Mile Cup), Major Emblem, Admire Mars, Resistencia, Serifos, Double Major, and Ascoli Piceno. Admire Mars in turn sired Embroidery (Oka Sho, Shuka Sho, Victoria Mile).
- Hat Trick sired Dabirsim and King David (Jamaica Handicap).
- Deep Impact sired Gentildonna (Triple Tiara, Japan Cup, Arima Kinen), Deep Brillante (Tokyo Yushun), Kizuna (Tokyo Yushun), Harp Star (Oka Sho), A Shin Hikari (Hong Kong Cup, Prix d'Ispahan), Makahiki (Tokyo Yushun), Shonan Pandora (Shuka Sho, Japan Cup), Beauty Parlour (Poule d'Essai des Pouliches), Ayusan, Verxina, Tosen Ra, Mikki Isle, Dee Majesty, Spielberg (Tennō Shō), Lachesis (Queen Elizabeth II Commemorative Cup), Danon Shark (Mile Championship), Shonan Adela (Hanshin Juvenile Fillies), Danon Platina (Asahi Hai Futurity Stakes), Real Impact, Mikki Queen, Marialite, Real Steel, Sinhalite, Danon Premium, Vivlos (Shuka Sho, Dubai Turf), Satono Diamond (Kikuka Sho, Arima Kinen), Al Ain (Satsuki Sho, Osaka Hai), Saxon Warrior, Study of Man, Fierement (Kikuka Sho, Tenno Sho (Spring) (twice)), Fierce Impact, Wagnerian (Tokyo Yushun), Gran Alegria (Oka Sho, Dual Miles: Yasuda Kinen and Mile Championship, Sprinters Stakes, Victoria Mile), Roger Barows, World Premiere (Kikuka Sho, Tenno Sho (Spring)), Loves Only You (Yushun Himba, Queen Elizabeth II Cup, Hong Kong Cup, Breeders' Cup Filly & Mare Turf), Contrail (Hopeful Stakes, Triple Crown, Japan Cup), Fancy Blue, Shahryar (Tokyo Yushun, Dubai Sheema Classic), Ask Victor More (Kikuka Sho), and Auguste Rodin. Kizuna in turn sired Akai Ito (Queen Elizabeth II Cup), Songline (Yasuda Kinen (twice), Victoria Mile), Justin Milano (Satsuki Sho), W Heart Bond (Champions Cup), Sixpence (Yasuda Kinen) and Natural Rise (Haneda Hai, Tokyo Derby). Gentildonna in turn foaled Geraldina (Queen Elizabeth II Cup). Real Steel in turn sired Saudi Cup and Breeders' Cup Classic winner Forever Young. Saxon Warrior in turn sired Victoria Road (Breeders' Cup Juvenile Turf) and Sheza Alibi (Randwick Guineas, Doncaster Mile). Study of Man in turn sired Kalpana (British Champions Fillies and Mares Stakes (twice), King George VI and Queen Elizabeth Stakes, Yorkshire Oaks). World Premiere in turn sired Lovcen (Hopeful Stakes, Satsuki Sho, Tokyo Yushun).
- Suzuka Phoenix sired Meiner Ho O (NHK Mile Cup)
- Gold Allure sired Espoir City, Smart Falcon, Copano Rickey, Gold Dream (February Stakes), Chrysoberyl (Japan Cup Dirt, Champions Cup), and Naran Huleg.
- Heart's Cry sired Just A Way, Admire Rakti, Cheval Grand, Nuovo Record (Yūshun Himba), One And Only, Lys Gracieux, Suave Richard, Yoshida, Time Flyer, Salios, Do Deuce, and Continuous. Suave Richard in turn sired Urban Chic (Kikuka Sho) and Regaleira (Hopeful Stakes, Arima Kinen, Queen Elizabeth II Cup).
- Black Tide sired Kitasan Black and Kamunyak. Kitasan Black in turn sired Equinox, Sol Oriens, and Croix du Nord.
- Suzuka Mambo sired Meisho Mambo and Sambista (Champions Cup)

In addition to his sons, his daughter Sun is Up was the dam of 2014 Breeders' Cup Mile winner Karakontie. Sunday Silence is also the damsire of Vermilion (foaled by Scarlet Lady), Screen Hero (foaled by Running Heroine), Rose Kingdom (foaled by Rosebud), Logotype (foaled by Stereotype), Duramente (foaled by Admire Groove), and Almond Eye (foaled by Fusaichi Pandora), among others. Duramente would go on to become the leading sire of 2023, siring Titleholder, Stars on Earth, Champagne Color, Dura Erede, Liberty Island, Durezza, Lugal, Energico and Masquerade Ball.

Shirayukihime, a daughter of Sunday Silence born with a white coat resulting from a rare mutation, is the grand-dam of Sodashi (Hanshin Juvenile Fillies, Oka Sho, Victoria Mile), the first white horse to win a Japanese G1 race, Mama Cocha (Sprinters Stakes) and Amante Bianco (Haneda Hai).

When Blood-Horse magazine started to include Japanese earnings in their stallion rankings in 2016, Sunday Silence was the leading broodmare sire of the year. In 2022, Gendarme (a grandson of Sunday Silence through his daughter Believe) won the G1 Sprinters Stakes, the same race his dam won in 2002. In 2025, Forever Young (a great-grandson of Sunday Silence through his son Deep Impact) won the 2025 Breeders' Cup Classic, the first win in the Classic for Japan.

== Death ==
Sunday Silence died on August 19, 2002. He had been treated for laminitis for the previous 14 weeks and had developed an infection in one leg as well. He had been given a stronger dose of a different painkilling medication the previous day to provide him relief, and apparently as a result, he had become comfortable enough to lie down for the first time in a week. The following morning, he appeared unable to rise, and while veterinarians were discussing what to do, he died, apparently of heart failure.

== Racing statistics ==
The data below is based on data available on Equibase.

Date	Distance	Race	Grade	Track	Finish	Winning (losing) margin	Winner (Second place)	Jockey	Ref.
Oct 30, 1988	6^{1}/_{2} furlongs	Maiden Special Weight		Santa Anita Park	2	nose	Caro Lover	Pat Valenzuela	
Nov 13, 1988	6 furlongs	Maiden Special Weight		Hollywood Park	1	10 lengths	(Moment of Time)	Pat Valenzuela	
Dec 3, 1988	6^{1}/_{2} furlongs	Allowance		Hollywood Park	2	head	Houston	Pat Valenzuela	
Mar 2, 1989	6^{1}/_{2} furlongs	Allowance		Santa Anita Park	1	4^{1}/_{2} lengths	(Heroic Type)	Pat Valenzuela	
Mar 19, 1989	8^{1}/_{2} furlongs	San Felipe Stakes	II	Santa Anita Park	1	1^{3}/_{4} lengths	(Flying Continental)	Pat Valenzuela	
Apr 8, 1989	9 furlongs	Santa Anita Derby	I	Santa Anita Park	1	11 lengths	(Flying Continental)	Pat Valenzuela	
May 6, 1989	10 furlongs	Kentucky Derby	I	Churchill Downs	1	2^{1}/_{2} lengths	(Easy Goer)	Pat Valenzuela	
May 20, 1989	9^{1}/_{2} furlongs	Preakness Stakes	I	Pimlico	1	nose	(Easy Goer)	Pat Valenzuela	
Jun 10, 1989	12 furlongs	Belmont Stakes	I	Belmont Park	2	8 lengths	Easy Goer	Pat Valenzuela	
Jul 23, 1989	10 furlongs	Swaps Stakes	II	Hollywood Park	2	^{3}/_{4} length	Prized	Pat Valenzuela	
Sep 24, 1989	10 furlongs	Super Derby	I	Louisiana Downs	1	6 lengths	(Awe Inspiring)	Pat Valenzuela	
Nov 4, 1989	10 furlongs	Breeders' Cup Classic	I	Gulfstream Park	1	neck	(Easy Goer)	Chris McCarron	
Jun 3, 1990	9 furlongs	Californian Stakes	I	Hollywood Park	1	^{3}/_{4} length	(Stylish Winner)	Pat Valenzuela	
Jun 24, 1990	10 furlongs	Hollywood Gold Cup	I	Hollywood Park	2	head	Criminal Type	Pat Valenzuela	

== Pedigree ==
Pedigree of Sunday Silence (USA), brown or black stallion, 1986
Sire Halo black 1969	Hail To Reason brown 1958	Turn-To (IRE) bay 1951	Royal Charger (GB)
Sire Halo black 1969	Hail To Reason brown 1958	Turn-To (IRE) bay 1951	Source Sucree (FR)
Sire Halo black 1969	Hail To Reason brown 1958	Nothirdchance bay 1948	Blue Swords
Sire Halo black 1969	Hail To Reason brown 1958	Nothirdchance bay 1948	Galla Colors
Sire Halo black 1969	Cosmah brown 1953	Cosmic Bomb dark brown 1944	Pharamond (GB)
Sire Halo black 1969	Cosmah brown 1953	Cosmic Bomb dark brown 1944	Banish Fear
Sire Halo black 1969	Cosmah brown 1953	Almahmoud chestnut 1947	Mahmoud (FR)
Sire Halo black 1969	Cosmah brown 1953	Almahmoud chestnut 1947	Arbitrator
Dam Wishing Well brown 1975	Understanding chestnut 1963	Promised Land gray 1954	Palestinian
Dam Wishing Well brown 1975	Understanding chestnut 1963	Promised Land gray 1954	Mahmoudess
Dam Wishing Well brown 1975	Understanding chestnut 1963	Pretty Ways brown 1953	Stymie
Dam Wishing Well brown 1975	Understanding chestnut 1963	Pretty Ways brown 1953	Pretty Jo
Dam Wishing Well brown 1975	Mountain Flower bay 1964	Montparnasse (ARG) brown 1956	Gulf Stream (GB)
Dam Wishing Well brown 1975	Mountain Flower bay 1964	Montparnasse (ARG) brown 1956	Mignon (ARG)
Dam Wishing Well brown 1975	Mountain Flower bay 1964	Edelweiss bay 1959	Hillary
Dam Wishing Well brown 1975	Mountain Flower bay 1964	Edelweiss bay 1959	Dowager (Family: 3-e)

== In popular culture ==
In the horse racing game Derby Owners Club, Sunday Silence is one of the sires available to breed in the game. He is also pictured on one of the official game cards.

In the Japanese franchise Umamusume: Pretty Derby, the unseen ghost "friend" of another character, Manhattan Cafe, is believed by many to be Sunday Silence. Other references to Sunday Silence exist in the series, but the horse itself is never mentioned by name.

== See also ==
- List of racehorses
