= Sinhalite (horse) =

Japanese-bred Thoroughbred racehorse

Sinhalite; シンハライト
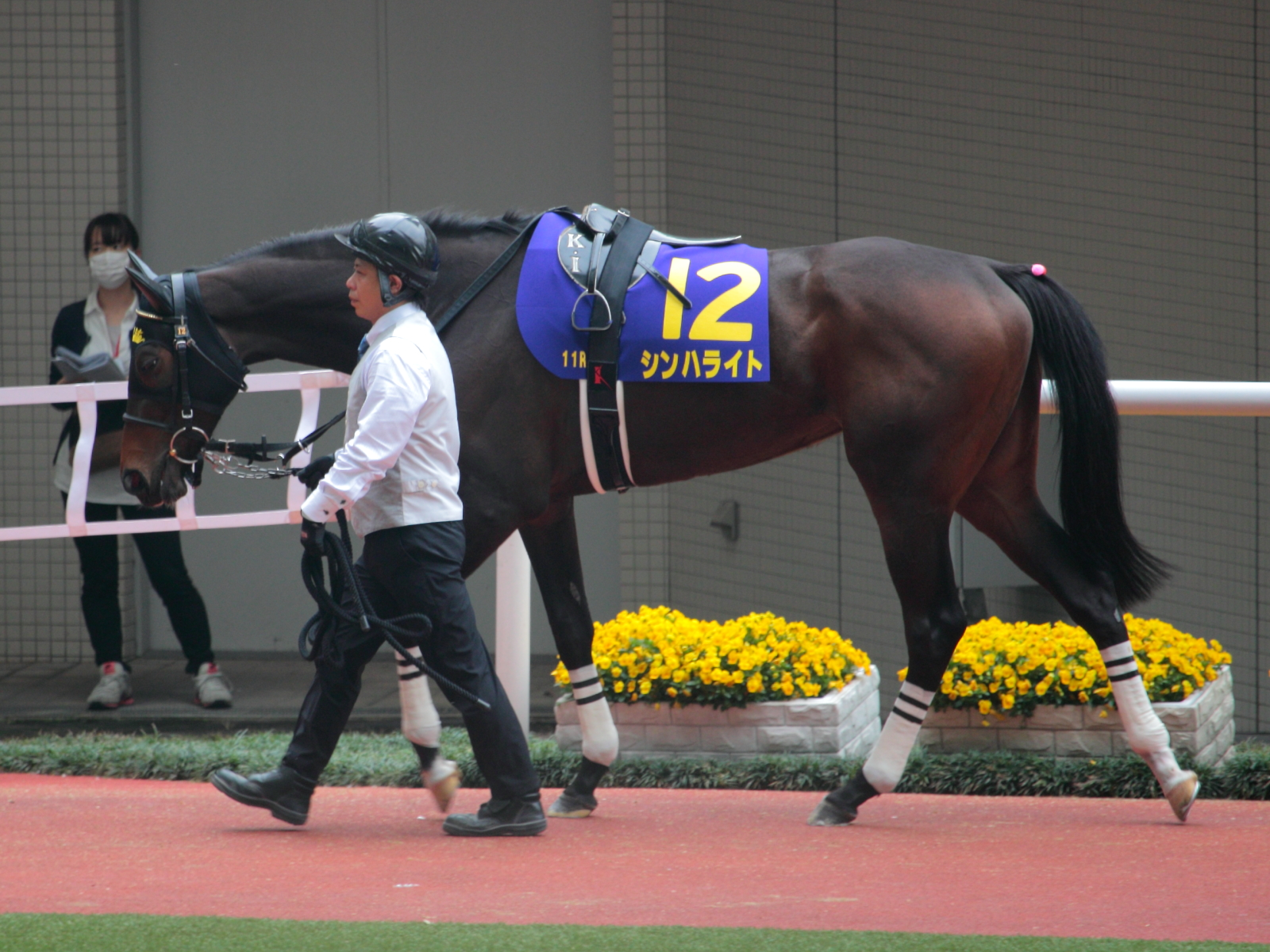
- Sinhalite in 2016
- Sire: Deep Impact
- Grandsire: Sunday Silence
- Dam: Singhalese
- Damsire: Singspiel
- Sex: Mare
- Foaled: 11 April 2013
- Country: Japan
- Colour: Dark bay
- Breeder: Northern Farm
- Owner: U Carrot Farm
- Racing colours
- Trainer: Sei Ishizaka
- Jockey: Kenichi Ikezoe
- Record: 6: 5-1-0
- Earnings: ¥286,426,000

Major wins
- Tulip Sho (2016); Rose Stakes (2016); Japanese Classic Tiara Race wins: Yushun Himba (2016)

Awards
- JRA Award for Best Three-Year-Old Filly (2016)

Sinhalite (Japanese シンハライト, foaled 11 April 2013) is a Japanese Thoroughbred racehorse and broodmare. In a racing career which lasted from October 2015 until September 2016 she won five of her six races. After winning her only start as a juvenile, she took a minor race on her three-year-old debut. She won the Tulip Sho and then sustained her only defeat when she finished a close second in the Oka Sho. At Tokyo in May she recorded her biggest win when taking the Yushun Himba. She returned in autumn to win the Rose Stakes but then sustained a leg injury which ended her track career.

== Background ==
Sinhalite is a "small-framed" dark bay mare bred in Japan by Northern Farm. During her racing career she was trained by Sei Ishizaka and raced in the green, white and red colours of the Northern Farm affiliate U Carrot Farm. She was ridden in all of her races by Kenichi Ikezoe.

She is from the sixth crop of foals sired by Deep Impact, who was the Japanese Horse of the Year in 2005 and 2006, winning races including the Tokyo Yushun, Tenno Sho, Arima Kinen and Japan Cup. Deep Impact's other progeny include Gentildonna, Harp Star, Kizuna, A Shin Hikari, Marialite and Makahiki. Sinhalite's dam Singhalese won one race in her native England before taking the Del Mar Oaks in 2005 before being sold for $1,900,000 at Keeneland and exported to Japan in 2007. She was descended from the broodmare New Moon (foaled 1940) who was a half-sister to Hyperion, Sickle and Pharamond and the female-line ancestor of Wassl and Twilight Son.

== Racing career ==
=== 2015: two-year-old season ===
On her track debut, Sinhalite contested an event for previously unraced juveniles over 1600 metres at Kyoto Racecourse on 10 October 2015 and won from Oken Believe and thirteen others.

=== 2016: three-year-old season ===
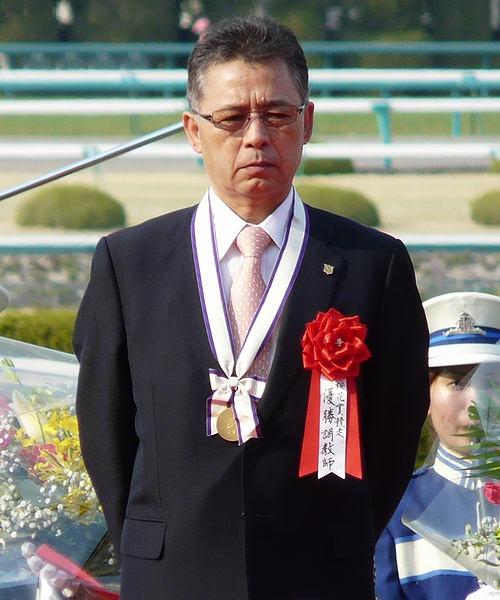
Sei Ishikawa, who trained Sinhalite throughout her racing career

Sinhalite began her second season at Kyoto on 17 January when she won the Kobai Stakes over 1400 metres. On 5 March she was stepped up in class for the Grade 3 Tulip Sho (a major trial race for the Oka Sho) over 1600 metres at Hanshin Racecourse and started the 4.6/1 second favourite behind Jeweler. Sinhalite produced a strong finish and won by a nose from Jeweler with the 40/1 outsider Lavender Valley in third place. In the Oka Sho at the same track on 10 April the filly started 3.9/1 second choice in the betting behind the 2015 juvenile champion Major Emblem, with Jeweler third in the market. After being settled in mid-division she produced a strong run on the outside and took the lead 100 metres from the finish but was caught on the line and beaten a nose by Jeweler.

On 22 May Sinhalite was stepped up in distance for the Yushun Himba over 2400 metres at Tokyo Racecourse and, with Jeweler sidelined by injury, she started a strong favourite against seventeen opponents. The best fancied of her rivals were Cecchino (winner of the Flora Stakes), Angel Face (Flower Cup), At The Seaside (third in the Oka Sho), Denko Ange (Artemis Stakes) and Rottenmeier. The favourite raced towards the rear of the field and the outsider Dantsu Pendant set a steady pace and still had a great deal of ground to make up on the final turn. Sinhalite wove her way through the field before finally obtaining a clear run in the last 50 metres and won by a neck and half a length from Cecchino and Biche. After the race Kenichi Ikezoe said "We missed a beat coming out of the gate and had to race further back than intended in the early stages, but we were able to recover some ground along the way. I was instructed by the trainer to save as much ground as possible since we had a good chance in the race from a good inside draw, so I didn’t attempt to go wide, squeezing our way between horses instead. Once escaping the crowd, she responded really well and switched into gear".

After a summer break of almost four months, Sinhalite returned to action in the Rose Stakes (a major trial for the Shuka Sho) over 1800 metres at Hanshin on 18 September. Starting the 0.6/1 favourite on heavy ground she caught the front-running outsider Crocosmia in the final stride and won by a nose. Her old rivals Denko Ange, Jeweler, At The Seaside and Lavender Valley finished unplaced. The filly was being prepared for a run in the Shuka Sho when she sustained a tendon injury to her left foreleg and did not race competitively again.

== Racing form ==
Sinhalite won five races and finished second once in six starts. This data is available based on JBIS and netkeiba.

| Date | Track | Race | Grade | Distance (Condition) | Entry | HN | Odds (Favored) | Finish | Time | Margins | Jockey | Winner (Runner-up) |
|---|---|---|---|---|---|---|---|---|---|---|---|---|
2015 – two-year-old season
| Oct 10 | Kyoto | 2yo Newcomer | | 1,600 m (Firm) | 15 | 10 | 2.4 (1) | 1st | 1:36.3 | –0.2 | Kenichi Ikezoe | (Oken Believe) |
2016 – three-year-old season
| Jan 17 | Kyoto | Kobai Stakes | OP | 1,400 m (Firm) | 13 | 9 | 3.0 (1) | 1st | 1:21.5 | 0.0 | Kenichi Ikezoe | (One to One) |
| Mar 5 | Hanshin | Tulip Sho | 3 | 1,600 m (Firm) | 16 | 11 | 5.6 (2) | 1st | R1:32.8 | 0.0 | Kenichi Ikezoe | Jeweler |
| Apr 10 | Hanshin | Oka Sho | 1 | 1,600 m (Firm) | 18 | 12 | 4.9 (2) | 2nd | 1:33.4 | 0.0 | Kenichi Ikezoe | Jeweler |
| May 22 | Tokyo | Yushun Himba | 1 | 2,400 m (Firm) | 18 | 3 | 2.0 (1) | 1st | 2:25.0 | 0.0 | Kenichi Ikezoe | (Cecchino) |
| Sep 18 | Hanshin | Rose Stakes | 2 | 1,800 m (Soft) | 15 | 7 | 1.6 (1) | 1st | 1:46.7 | 0.0 | Kenichi Ikezoe | (Crocosmia) |

Legend:
Turf

- R indicated that it was a record finish time.

== Assessment and awards ==
In the JRA Awards for 2016 Sinhalite topped the poll for the JRA Award for Best Three-Year-Old Filly, taking 277 of the 291 votes.

== Pedigree ==
Pedigree of Sinhalite (JPN), dark bay mare 2013
| Sire Deep Impact (JPN) 2002 | Sunday Silence (USA); 1986 | Halo | Hail to Reason |
| Sire Deep Impact (JPN) 2002 | Sunday Silence (USA); 1986 | Halo | Cosmah |
| Sire Deep Impact (JPN) 2002 | Sunday Silence (USA); 1986 | Wishing Well | Understanding |
| Sire Deep Impact (JPN) 2002 | Sunday Silence (USA); 1986 | Wishing Well | Mountain Flower |
| Sire Deep Impact (JPN) 2002 | Wind in Her Hair (IRE); 1991 | Alzao | Lyphard |
| Sire Deep Impact (JPN) 2002 | Wind in Her Hair (IRE); 1991 | Alzao | Lady Rebecca |
| Sire Deep Impact (JPN) 2002 | Wind in Her Hair (IRE); 1991 | Burghclere | Busted |
| Sire Deep Impact (JPN) 2002 | Wind in Her Hair (IRE); 1991 | Burghclere | Highclere |
| Dam Singhalese (GB) 2002 | Singspiel (IRE); 1992 | In The Wings | Sadler's Wells |
| Dam Singhalese (GB) 2002 | Singspiel (IRE); 1992 | In The Wings | High Hawk |
| Dam Singhalese (GB) 2002 | Singspiel (IRE); 1992 | Glorious Song | Halo |
| Dam Singhalese (GB) 2002 | Singspiel (IRE); 1992 | Glorious Song | Ballade |
| Dam Singhalese (GB) 2002 | Baize (GB); 1993 | Efisio | Formidable |
| Dam Singhalese (GB) 2002 | Baize (GB); 1993 | Efisio | Eldoret |
| Dam Singhalese (GB) 2002 | Baize (GB); 1993 | Bayonne | Bay Express |
| Dam Singhalese (GB) 2002 | Baize (GB); 1993 | Bayonne | Lambay (Family: 6-e) |

- Sinhalite was inbred 3 × 4 to Halo, meaning that this stallion appears in both the third and fourth generations of her pedigree.
