= Mirco Demuro =

Italian jockey

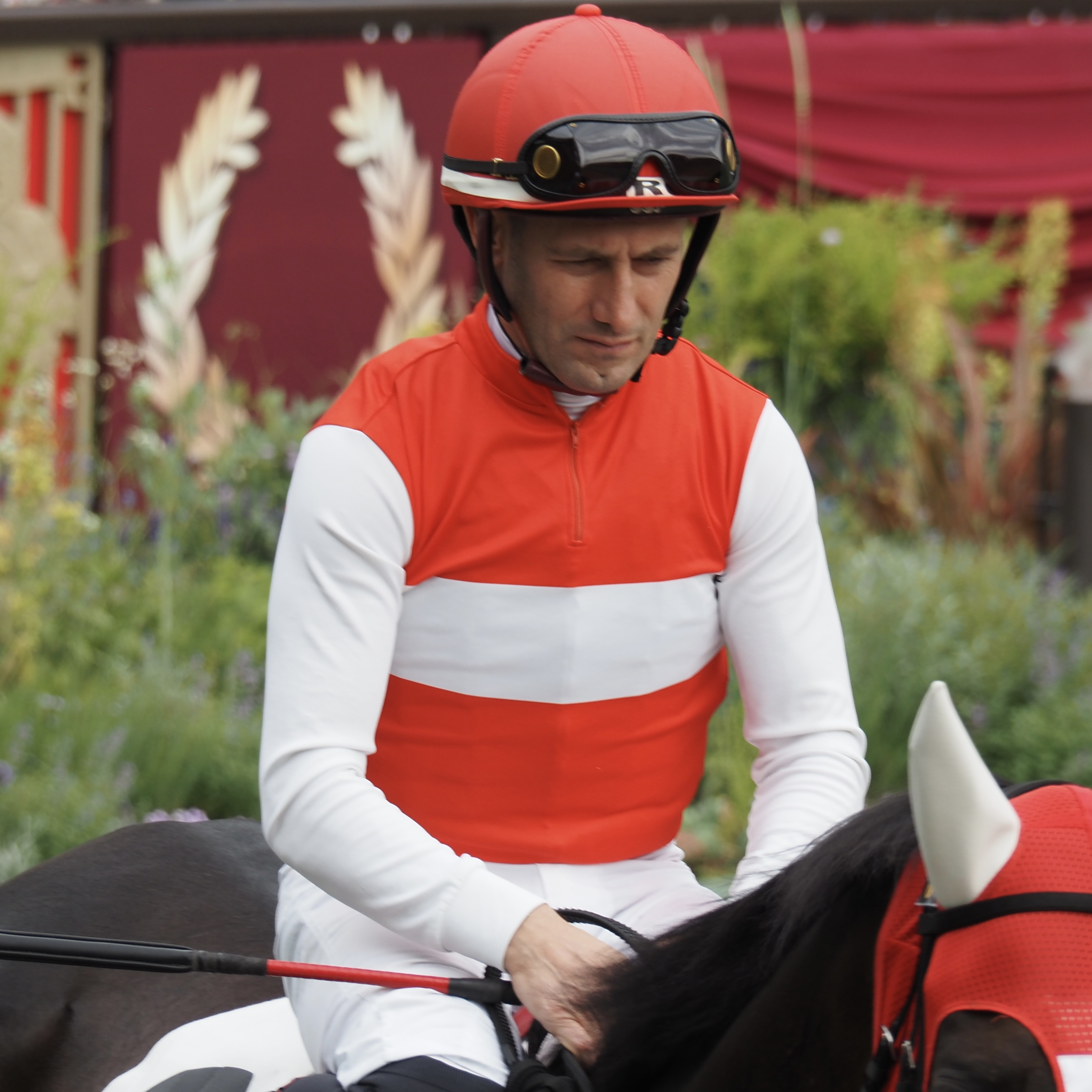
- Mirco Demuro at the Tokyo Yushun (2023)

Personal information
- Nationality: Italy
- Born: January 11, 1979 (age 47) Rome, Italy
- Occupation: Jockey
- Height: 156 cm (5 ft 1 in)
- Weight: 52 kg (115 lb)

Horse racing career
- Sport: Horse racing
- Career wins: 1300 (JRA)

Significant horses
- Neo Universe, Daiwa Major, Victoire Pisa, Eishin Flash, Duramente, Leontes, Uberleben, Omega Perfume

Mirco Demuro (Japanese: ミルコ・デムーロ, January 11, 1979) is an Italian jockey based in Japan. His younger brother, Cristian, as well as their sister, Pamela, is also a jockey. Their late father Giovanni was also a jockey.

== Career ==
Mirco Demuro first earned his jockey license in 1994 and became the leading learning jockey of Italy in 1995. He was the leading jockey of Italy from 1997 to 2000. Among the horses he rode in Italy was Falbrav, who he rode on the horse's maiden race.

Demuro first came to Japan in 1999, and won his first graded race in the country in 2001 when he won the Kokura Daishoten with Misuzu Chardon.

Demuro's first Japanese Grade 1 race victory came at the Satsuki Sho with Neo Universe on April 20, 2003. The two went on to also win the Japanese Derby held on June 1, making him the first non-Japanese jockey to win the Tokyo Yushun. The crowd celebrated the jockey with a "Mirco" chant, to which Mirco showed tears of joy. Mirco later recalled that "the joy he felt that day was comparable to that of when he won the Derby Italiano. Being watched on and cheered by so many fans at horse racing is a rare occurrence, especially when that is the Derby. It was as though I became Nakata from soccer".

With Neo Universe clinching two Triple Crown races, many anticipated the horse to win the third leg of the Triple Crown. However, the policy of short-term licence (短期免許, tanki menkyo) system employed by the Japan Racing Association at the time did not allow for foreign jockeys to ride in Japan for more than three months a year; something which Mirco had already used up by that point. The JRA had to change the rule to allow for foreign jockeys (such as Demuro) to ride the same horse at a GI race if said horse had already won two other GI races in the same year; allowing for him to continue riding Neo Universe. However, he was unable to win the third leg of the Triple Crown, as the horse finished third at the Kikka Sho.

The following year, Demuro became the first foreign jockey to win the Satsuki Sho for two years in a row after winning the race once again with Daiwa Major.

On March 26, 2011, Mirco Demuro became the winning jockey of the Dubai World Cup with Victoire Pisa, who was sired by Neo Universe. This was the first time a Japanese horse had won the race, and for Demuro became the first GI win outside of Italy and Japan; with Demuro commenting that this was his best race ever.

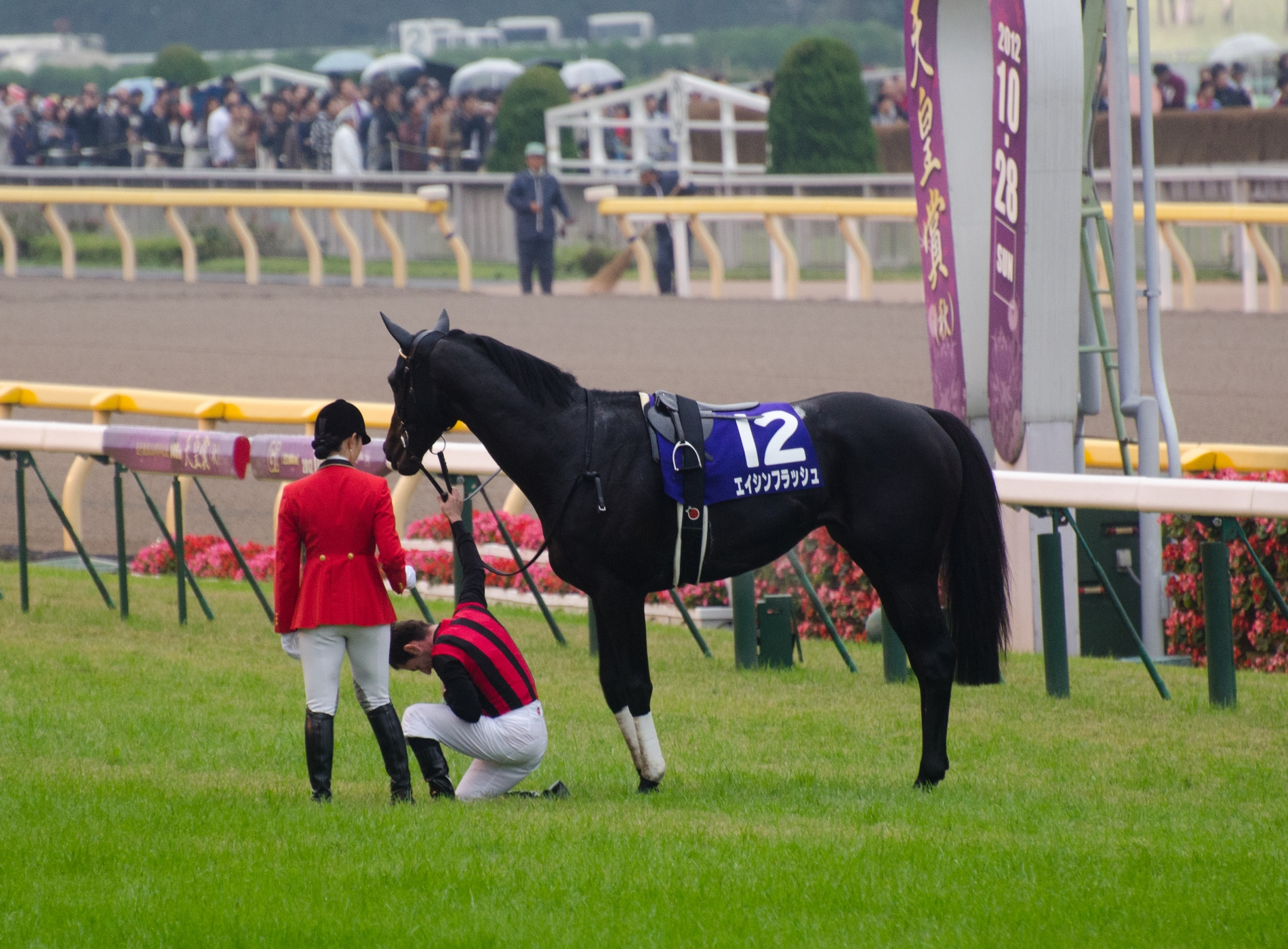
Demuro and Eishin Flash at the 2012 Autumn Tenno Sho

On October 28, 2012, Demuro won the Autumn Tenno Sho with Eishin Flash. The race was spectated by Emperor Akihito and Empress Michiko, and after performing the winning run, Demuro, in defiance of JRA policy specifically forbidding jockeys to get off their horse until the post-race weigh-in barring incapacitation, dismounted from the horse and kneeled to the Emperor and Empress. This action was briefly put into question by JRA judges, but was ultimately deemed that "the winning jockey only did as he was instructed, which was to show appropriate respect to The Emperor and Empress" and was not punished for his actions.

Demuro became the first foreign jockey to take the JRA full-time jockey license exam in 2013, but could not pass the exam. Demuro, together with Christophe Lemaire, passed the exam in January 2015, making them the first jockeys from abroad to become full-time JRA jockeys.

== Major wins ==
France

- Prix Rothschild - (1) - Marbye (2004)

Germany

- Preis der Diana - (1) - Feodora (2014)

Hong Kong

- Hong Kong Stewards' Cup - (1) - Blazing Speed (2014)

Italy

- Derby Italiano - (2) - Rakti (2002), Worthadd (2010)
- Gran Premio del Jockey Club - (1) - Sumati (1999)
- Gran Premio di Milano - (1) - Voila Ici (2011)
- Oaks d'Italia - (2) - Timi (2000), Night of Magic (2009)
- Premio Presidente della Repubblica - (4) - Timboroa (2000), Distant Way (2006, 2007), Selmis (2009)
- Premio Roma - (1) - Voila Ici (2009)

Japan

- Asahi Hai Futurity Stakes - (4) - Grand Prix Boss (2010), Logotype (2012), Leontes (2015), Admire Mars (2018)
- Arima Kinen - (1) - Victoire Pisa (2010)
- Champions Cup - (2) - Sambista (2015), Le Vent Se Leve (2018)
- February Stakes - (2) - Moanin (2016), Gold Dream (2017)
- Hanshin Juvenile Fillies - (1) - Circle of Life (2021)
- Hopeful Stakes - (1) - Saturnalia (2018)
- Oka Sho - (1) - Jeweler (2016)
- Japan Cup - (1) - Screen Hero (2008)
- Japan Dirt Derby - (1) - Le Vent Se Leve (2018)
- JBC Sprint - (1) - Danon Legend (2016)
- Mile Championship - (1) - Persian Knight (2017)
- Mile Championship Nambu Hai - (1) - Le Vent Se Leve (2018)
- NHK Mile Cup - (2) - Admire Mars (2019), Lauda Sion (2020)
- Kikka Sho - (1) - Kiseki (2017)
- Osaka Hai - (1) - Suave Richard (2018), Lucky Lilac (2020)
- Queen Elizabeth II Cup - (2) - Queens Ring (2016), Mozu Katchan (2017)
- Satsuki Sho - (4) - Neo Universe (2003), Daiwa Major (2004), Logotype (2013), Duramente (2015)
- Sprinters Stakes - (2) - Red Falx (2016, 2017)
- Takamatsunomiya Kinen - (1) - Copano Richard (2014)
- Takarazuka Kinen - (1) - Satono Crown (2017)
- Tenno Sho (Autumn) - (1) - Eishin Flash (2012)
- Tokyo Daishoten (4) - Omega Perfume (2018, 2019, 2020, 2021)
- Tokyo Yushun - (2) - Neo Universe (2003), Duramente (2015)
- Yushun Himba - (2) - Loves Only You (2019), Uberleben (2021)
- Zen-Nippon Nisai Yushun - (1) - Le Vent Se Leve (2017)

United Arab Emirates

- Dubai World Cup - (1) - Victoire Pisa (2011)
