= No Reason (horse) =

Japanese-bred Thoroughbred racehorse

No Reason ノーリーズン
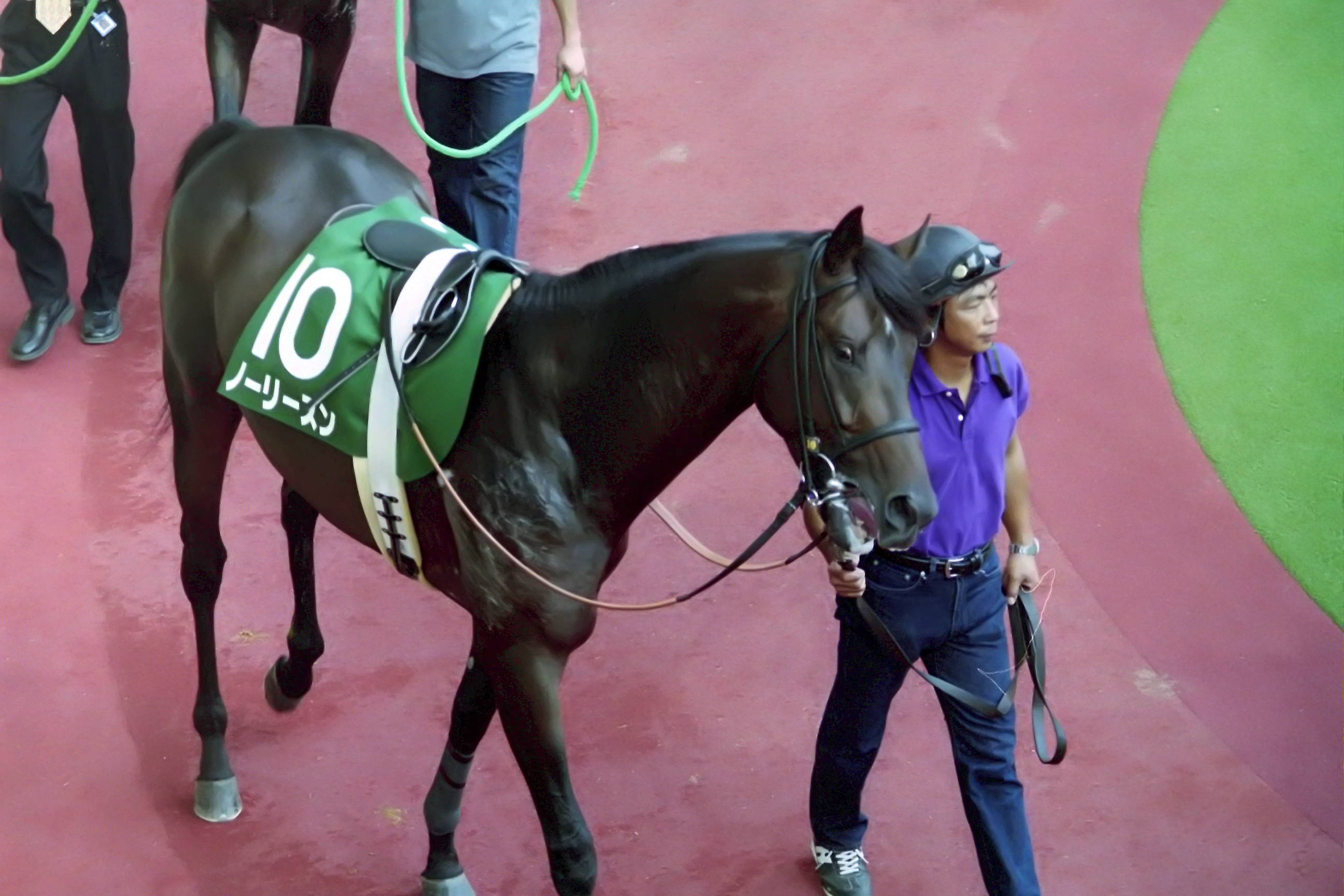
- No Reason at the paddock during the Asahi Challenge Cup on September 11, 2004.
- Breed: Thoroughbred
- Sire: Brian's Time
- Grandsire: Roberto
- Dam: Ambrosine
- Damsire: Mr. Prospector
- Sex: Stallion
- Foaled: 4 June 1999
- Died: 7 May 2024 (aged 25)
- Country: Japan
- Color: Bay
- Breeder: North Hills Co Ltd
- Owner: Shinji Maeda
- Racing colors
- Trainer: Yasuo Ikee
- Jockey: Yutaka Take; Brett Doyle
- Record: 12: 3-1-0
- Earnings: ¥186,017,000

Major wins
- Japanese Classic Race wins: Satsuki Sho (2002)

No Reason (Japanese: ノーリーズン, Hepburn: Nō Rīzun; 4 June, 1999 - 7 May 2024) was a Japanese Thoroughbred racehorse and sire. He was famously known for his upset victory at the 2002 Satsuki Sho despite the unlucky draw entrance, ridden by unfamiliar jockey (Brett Doyle) and as the fifteenth favourite for the race.

== Background ==
No Reason was sire by Brian's Time, who was a successful sire in Japan as he was also the sire of the 1994 triple crown winner, Narita Brian; 1995 Kikuka Sho and Arima Kinen winner, Mayano Top Gun; 1997 Satsuki Sho and Tokyo Yushun winner, Sunny Brian and also a fellow rival who eventually would win the 2002 Tokyo Yushun, Tanino Gimlet. Her dam, Ambrosine was sired by Mr. Prospector, who was one of the leading sires in America.

== Racing career ==
=== 2002: three-year-old season ===
On 5th of January, he made a debut at the Kyoto Racecourse with Yutaka Take on his saddle and won by two lengths over Agnes Planet. Take stayed as his jockey at the second race in Kobushi Sho where he positioned at the middle to front group before bolted up field and got his second win by three-quarters-of-a-length over Matikanemenimomiyo. With two wins, he joined one of the Satsuki Sho trial which was the Wakaba Stakes. With Yuichi Fukunaga at the jockey this time, No Reason ran well and stayed at third place before losing out at the final straight and finished in seventh. Due to this result, his participation in the classic had to be decided by the lottery. Thankfully, he was selected even though with a low chance of 2/7. At the race day, he would start from the stall number two and ridden by a short-term license foreign jockey, Brett Doyle. In the first half of the race, he was slow to get going and trailed in about 10th position. As the race progressed, The pace picked up and the horses started to make move into position aggressively. However, at the fourth turn, lots of favoured horses including Tanino Gimlet were forced wide and the gap between them and the leading group stabilized. Meanwhile, No Reason stayed firm on the inside track, made a good turn around the corner and drew level with the leading group at the start of the straight. He took the lead halfway down the straight and then extended his finishing kick even further. At the final 200 metres, Tiger Cafe and Tanino Gimlet started to chase back but No Reason held on to win the race by one and three-quarters-of-a-length over Tiger Cafe in second place. In this race, No Reason broke the speed record of the competition by 0.5 seconds quicker than previous record setter, Narita Brian in 1994. At the Tokyo Yushun one month later, He ran in the race as the second favorite but an accident occurred after the race when a fracture was discovered as he finished in eighth place. He recovered from said injury and ran well on the Kikuka Sho trial, the Kobe Shimbun Hai. In this race, Take who returned as his jockey rode him at the back of the pack in early phase before charged forward after two-thirds of the race, only coming in second place behind Symboli Kris S who was on similar strategy as him. Due to Symboli Kris S opting for the Tenno Sho (Autumn), No Reason became the favourite for the Kikuka Sho for this season. Unfortunately, he reared up, fell and threw Take off the saddle at the start and did not finish the race. The race turned up to be another major upset of the season as it was won by Hishi Miracle (10th favourite) with Fast Tateyama (16th favourite) finished in second place. He finished the year with an eighth-place finished at the Japan Cup and sixth-place finished at the Arima Kinen.

=== 2003–2004: Later seasons ===
At the start of the 2003 season, he finished well in his first two races with a fifth-place finished at the Kyoto Kinen and a fourth-place finished at the Hanshin Daishoten which would be the preparatory races for the Tenno Sho (Spring). Sadly, he developed a superficial digital flexor tendonitis in his left foreleg and took a break for the rest of the season. He returned at the Asahi Challenge Cup in autumn 2004 but finished poorly at the last place (11th). He was retired from racing and moved to stud duty soon after this race at the North Hills Management Farm at Niikappu, Hokkaido.

== Stud career, retirement and death ==
North Hills Management moved him to Yushun Stallion Station in 2005 for his first stud duty. He was not good as a sire, in which the best progeny he ever had was Kiss Me Prince who placed third at the 2008 Zen-Nippon Nisai Yushun. For his total career as a stud; he covered 110 mares, produced 79 foals, registered 75 foals as racehorses, earned ¥286,462,500 in progeny winnings with AEI of 0.32.

He was then retired as a stud and moved to Matsuura Riding Center in Minamisoma City, Fukushima and proposed to live out his remaining live there. During the Tohoku Earthquake in 2011, he was among the horses that being evacuated to Utsunomiya University. He moved back to Matsuura Riding Center not long after that.

Then, he was moved to Shikagashira Stable which was located on the same town in 2014. During his time there, he participated in a Shinto ritual event called Soma Nomaoi which is a traditional event in Soma, Fukushima, in the "Sacred Flag Scramble" and "Procession" until 2023.

No Reason died on 7th of May, 2024 at the age of 25.

== In popular culture ==
An anthropomorphized version of No Reason appears as a character in the Japanese multimedia franchise Umamusume: Pretty Derby, voiced by Hiyori Kono. She is depicted as a courageous, uninhibited girl whose dream is to become a shogun with the boldness and mannerisms of a warlord from the Sengoku period. However, her overconfidence in her abilities often leads her to make shortsighted decisions and critical mistakes. Her race outfit resembles armor of a Japanese samurai, referencing her real-life counterpart's participation in the Soma Nomaoi following his racing and breeding tenure.

== Racing form ==
No Reason won three races out of 12 starts. This data is available based on JBIS and netkeiba.

Date	Racecourse	Race	Grade	Distance (Condition)	Entry	HN	Odds (Favored)	Finish	Time	Margins	Jockey	Winner (Runner-up)
2002 – three-year-old season
5 Jan	Kyoto	3yo Debut		1,800 m (Firm)	16	1	6.7 (2)	1st	1:50.2	–0.3	Yutaka Take	(Agnes Planet)
9 Feb	Kyoto	Kobushi Sho	ALW (1W)	1,600 m (Firm)	15	12	3.6 (2)	1st	1:35.5	–0.1	Yutaka Take	(Matikanemenimomiyo)
16 Mar	Hanshin	Wakaba Stakes	OP	2,000 m (Firm)	11	7	5.3 (2)	7th	2:02.4	0.9	Yuichi Fukunaga	Shigeru God Hand
14 Apr	Nakayama	Satsuki Sho	1	2,000 m (Firm)	18	2	115.9 (15)	1st	R1:58.5	–0.3	Brett Doyle	(Tiger Cafe)
26 May	Tokyo	Tokyo Yushun	1	2,400 m (Firm)	18	2	5.0 (2)	8th	2:26.9	0.7	Masayoshi Ebina	Tanino Gimlet
22 Sep	Hanshin	Kobe Shimbun Hai	2	2,000 m (Firm)	16	15	5.7 (2)	2nd	1:59.5	0.4	Yutaka Take	Symboli Kris S
20 Oct	Kyoto	Kikuka Sho	1	3,000 m (Firm)	18	6	2.5 (1)	DNF	–	–	Yutaka Take	Hishi Miracle
24 Nov	Nakayama	Japan Cup	1	2,200 m (Firm)	16	9	13.2 (4)	8th	2:13.0	0.8	Masayoshi Ebina	Falbrav
22 Dec	Nakayama	Arima Kinen	1	2,500 m (Good)	14	6	20.8 (6)	6th	2:33.7	1.1	Masayoshi Ebina	Symboli Kris S
2003 – four-year-old season
22 Feb	Kyoto	Kyoto Kinen	2	2,200 m (Good)	16	6	3.7 (2)	5th	2:16.8	0.3	Yutaka Take	My Sole Sound
23 Mar	Hanshin	Hanshin Daishoten	2	3,000 m (Firm)	15	3	9.0 (3)	4th	3:06.6	0.7	Futoshi Komaki	Daitaku Bertram
2004 – five-year-old season
11 Sep	Hanshin	Asahi Challenge Cup	3	2,000 m (Firm)	11	10	14.4 (4)	11th	2:02.2	0.6	Katsumi Ando	Suzuka Mambo

Legend:
Turf

- R indicated that it was record time finish

== Pedigree ==
Pedigree of No Reason
Sire Brian's Time (USA) 1985	Roberto (USA); 1969	Hail to Reason	Turn-to
Sire Brian's Time (USA) 1985	Roberto (USA); 1969	Hail to Reason	Nothirdchance
Sire Brian's Time (USA) 1985	Roberto (USA); 1969	Bramalea	Nashua
Sire Brian's Time (USA) 1985	Roberto (USA); 1969	Bramalea	Rarelea
Sire Brian's Time (USA) 1985	Kelley's Day (USA); 1977	Graustark	Ribot
Sire Brian's Time (USA) 1985	Kelley's Day (USA); 1977	Graustark	Flower Bowl
Sire Brian's Time (USA) 1985	Kelley's Day (USA); 1977	Golden Trail	Hasty Road
Sire Brian's Time (USA) 1985	Kelley's Day (USA); 1977	Golden Trail	Sunny Vale
Dam Ambrosine (USA) 1988	Mr. Prospector (USA); 1970	Raise a Native	Native Dancer
Dam Ambrosine (USA) 1988	Mr. Prospector (USA); 1970	Raise a Native	Raise You
Dam Ambrosine (USA) 1988	Mr. Prospector (USA); 1970	Gold Digger	Nashua
Dam Ambrosine (USA) 1988	Mr. Prospector (USA); 1970	Gold Digger	Sequence
Dam Ambrosine (USA) 1988	Barada (USA); 1982	Damascus	Sword Dancer
Dam Ambrosine (USA) 1988	Barada (USA); 1982	Damascus	Kerala
Dam Ambrosine (USA) 1988	Barada (USA); 1982	Courtly Dee	Never Bend
Dam Ambrosine (USA) 1988	Barada (USA); 1982	Courtly Dee	Tulle

No Reason's family number is FA-4, and has an inbreeding of Nashua (S4xM4) and Nasrullah (S5xM5xM5).
