= Dance Partner =

Japanese-bred Thoroughbred racehorse

Dance Partner; ダンスパートナー
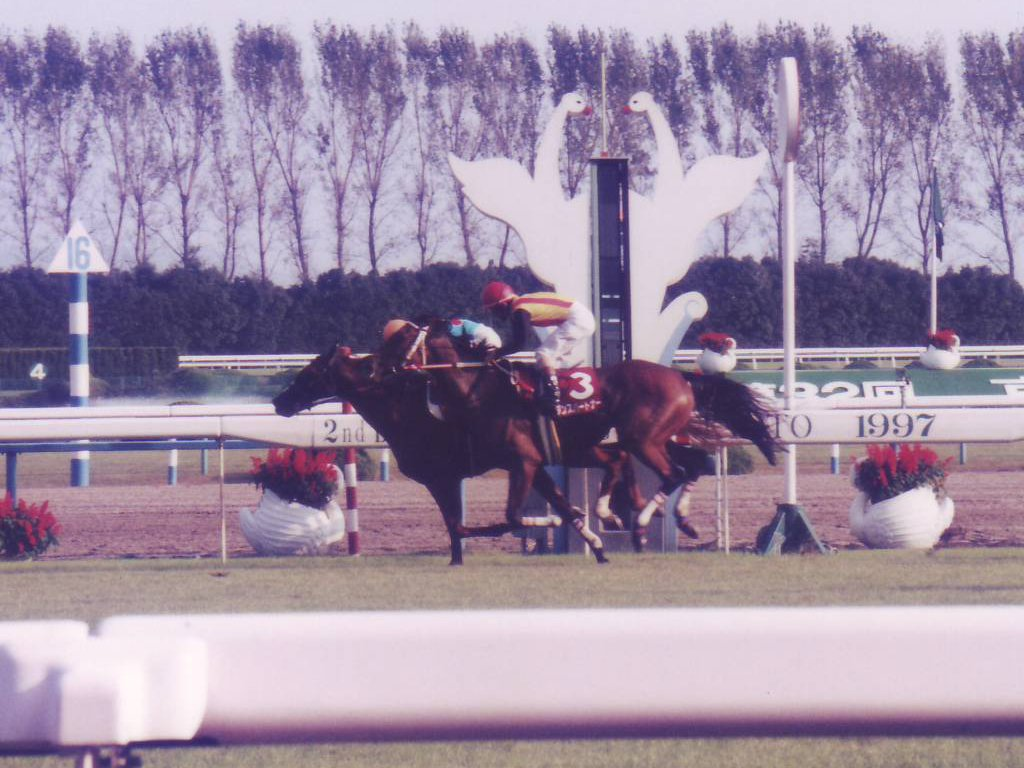
- Dance Partner (nearest camera) finishing second to Silk Justice
- Sire: Sunday Silence
- Grandsire: Halo
- Dam: Dancing Key
- Damsire: Nijinsky
- Sex: Mare
- Foaled: 25 May 1992
- Died: 14 October 2016 (aged 24)
- Country: Japan
- Colour: Bay
- Breeder: Shadai Farm
- Owner: Katsumi Yoshida
- Racing colours
- Trainer: Toshiaki Shirai
- Jockey: Hirofumi Shii; Hiroshi Kawachi
- Record: 25: 4-9-3
- Earnings: ¥603,781,000

Major wins
- Keihan Hai (1996); Queen Elizabeth II Commemorative Cup (1996); Japanese Classic Tiara Race wins: Yushun Himba (1995)

Awards
- JRA Award for Best Three-Year-Old Filly (1995); JRA Award for Best Older Filly or Mare (1996)

Dance Partner (Japanese: ダンスパートナー, Hepburn: Dansu Pātonā; 25 May 1992 - 14 October 2016) was a Japanese Thoroughbred racehorse and broodmare. From the first crop of foals sired by Sunday Silence, she won four of her twenty-five races and finished second nine times in a racing career which lasted from January 1995 until December 1997. She was unraced as a juvenile, but in 1995 she won the Yushun Himba and won the JRA Award for Best Three-Year-Old Filly. As a four-year-old, she won the Keian Hai and the Queen Elizabeth II Commemorative Cup and won the JRA Award for Best Older Filly or Mare. She failed to win as a five-year-old and was retired from racing at the end of the year. Apart from her victories she was placed in the Oka Sho, Prix de la Nonette, Kyoto Daishoten and Takarazuka Kinen (twice). She has had success as a broodmare, producing several good winners.

== Background ==
Dance Partner is a bay mare bred in Japan by Shadai Farm. She was from the first crop of foals sired by Sunday Silence, who won the 1989 Kentucky Derby, before retiring to stud in Japan where he was champion sire on thirteen consecutive occasions. His other major winners included Deep Impact, Stay Gold, Heart's Cry, Manhattan Cafe, Zenno Rob Roy and Neo Universe. Her dam Dancing Key was an unraced, American-bred mare who became a very successful broodmare in Japan. Dance Partner was a part of three full-blooded siblings alongside Dance in the Dark and Dance in the Mood (Oka Sho).

During her racing career, Dance Partner was trained by Toshiaki Shirai and owned by Katsumi Yoshida.

== Racing career ==
=== 1995: three-year-old season ===
Dance Partner began her racing career by winning a maiden race over 1200 metres at Kokura Racecourse on 29 January. She then competed at Kyoto Racecourse where she finished second to Shake Hand in the Elfin and second again to Yuki Vivace in the Grade III Tulip Sho. She was moved up to Grade I level for the Oka Sho over 1600 metres at Kyoto on 9 April when she finished second of the eighteen runners behind Wonder Perfume. On 21 May Dance Partner was one of eighteen fillies to contest the 56th running of the Yushun Himba over 2400 metres at Tokyo Racecourse. Ridden by Yutaka Take she won from Yuki Vivace with Wonder Perfume in third.

In late summer, Dance Partner was sent to Europe and ran twice in France. In the Group Three Prix de la Nonette at Deauville Racecourse on 27 August she took the lead in the straight but was caught in the final stride and beaten a short head by the Poule d'Essai des Pouliches winner Matiara. Two weeks later she started 2.3/1 favourite for the Group One Prix Vermeille at Longchamp Racecourse but finished sixth of the ten runners behind Carling.

In late autumn the filly returned to Japan and was matched against colts for the first time in the Kikuka Sho over 3000 metres on 7 November, finishing fifth behind Mayano Top Gun. On her final appearance of the year she finished second to Samani Beppin in the Grade II Sankeisports Hai Hanshin Hinba Tobubetsu at Hanshin Racecourse on 17 December.

In January 1996, Dance Number was named Best Three-Year-Old Filly at the JRA Awards for 1995.

=== 1996: four-year-old season ===
In the early part of 1996, Dance Partner finished second to Kanetsu Cross in the American Jockey Club Cup, second to T M Jumbo in the Kyoto Kinen and fourth to Taiki Blizzard in the Osaka Hai. On 11 May she was dropped to Grade III level for the Keihan Hai over 2200 metres at Kyoto and recorded her first success of the season as she won from Ibuki Tamon Yagura and Nehai Caesar. In her two remaining races of the spring campaign, she was moved back up to Grade I level, finishing sixth to Trot Thunder in the Yasuda Kinen and third behind Mayano Top Gun and Sunday Branch in the Takarazuka Kinen.

In October Dance Partner returned from her summer break and finished fourth to Marvelous Sunday in the Kyoto Daishoten. On November 10 she competed in all-female competition for the first time in 1996 when she was one of sixteen fillies and mares to contest the Queen Elizabeth II Commemorative Cup. Ridden by Hirofumi Shii, she won the Grade I prize from Hishi Amazon (winner of the race in 1994), Fair Dance and She's Grace. The runner-up was demoted to seventh after a steward's inquiry. In her two remaining races of that year, Dance Partner finished tenth behind Singspiel in the Japan Cup and sixth behind Sakura Laurel in the Arima Kinen.

Dance Partner won her second JRA Award in January 1997 when she was voted Best Older Filly or Mare for 1996.

=== 1997: five-year-old season ===
Dance Partner began her third season with a trip to Hong Kong for the Queen Elizabeth II Cup at Sha Tin Racecourse on 13 April, and finished eighth behind the South African-trained London News. On her return to Japan she finished third to Bubble Gum Fellow in Naruo Kinen at Hanshin in June. In July she finished third for the second consecutive year in the Takarazuka Kinen, beaten by Marvelous Sunday and Bubble Gum Fellow.

Dance Partner returned in October and finished second to the three-year-old colt Silk Justice in the Kyoto Daishoten and then attempted to repeat her 1996 success in the Queen Elizabeth II Commemorative Cup on 9 November. She narrowly failed to complete the double, being beaten a neck into second place by the four-year-old Erimo Chic. In December she was again invited to contest the Arima Kinen, but made no impact and finished unplaced behind Silk Justice.

== Racing form ==
Dance Partner won four races and placed in another 12 out of 25 starts. This data available is based on JBIS, netkeiba, racingpost and HKJC

Date	Track	Race	Grade	Distance (Condition)	Entry	HN	Odds (Favored)	Finish	Time	Margins	Jockey	Winner (Runner-up)
1995 – three-year-old season
Jan 29	Kokura	3yo Newcomer		1,200 m (Firm)	16	2	2.7 (1)	1st	1:10.6	–0.3	Hiroshi Matsui	(Gaily Attack)
Feb 18	Kyoto	Elfin Stakes	OP	1,600 m (Firm)	12	7	3.8 (2)	2nd	1:35.3	0.1	Koichi Tsunoda	Shake Hand
Mar 11	Kyoto	Tulip Sho	3	1,600 m (Firm)	11	6	2.4 (2)	2nd	1:35.1	0.0	Yutaka Take	Yuki Vivace
Apr 9	Hanshin	Oka Sho	1	1,600 m (Good)	18	17	7.6 (3)	2nd	1:34.4	0.0	Yutaka Take	Wonder Perfume
May 21	Tokyo	Yushun Himba	1	2,400 m (Firm)	18	5	4.6 (3)	1st	2:26.7	–0.3	Yutaka Take	(Yuki Vivace)
Aug 27	Deauville	Prix de la Nonette	3	2,000 m (Good)	4	1	29/10 (3)	2nd	2:11.4	0.1	Yutaka Take	Matiara
Sep 10	Longchamp	Prix Vermeille	1	2,400 m (Soft)	10	1	23/10 (1)	6th	2:33.2	0.4	Yutaka Take	Carling
Nov 5	Kyoto	Kikuka Sho	1	3,000 m (Firm)	18	4	4.9 (1)	5th	3:05.0	0.6	Yutaka Take	Mayano Top Gun
Dec 17	Hanshin	Hanshin Himba Stakes	2	2,000 m (Firm)	12	8	1.7 (1)	2nd	2:00.5	0.2	Yutaka Take	Samani Beppin
1996 – four-year-old season
Jan 21	Tokyo	American Jockey Club Cup	2	2,200 m (Firm)	9	3	7.4 (4)	2nd	2:15.3	0.3	Masayoshi Ebina	Kanetsu Cross
Feb 11	Kyoto	Kyoto Kinen	2	2,200 m (Firm)	8	4	2.8 (2)	2nd	2:14.6	0.6	Yutaka Take	T.M. Jumbo
Mar 31	Hanshin	Sankei Osaka Hai	2	2,000 m (Good)	12	3	4.2 (2)	4th	2:00.8	0.1	Yutaka Take	Taiki Blizzard
May 11	Kyoto	Keihan Hai	3	2,200 m (Firm)	16	6	2.9 (1)	1st	2:12.8	0.0	Hirofumi Shii	(Ibuki Tamon Kagura)
Jun 9	Tokyo	Yasuda Kinen	1	1,600 m (Firm)	17	5	15.4 (7)	6th	1:33.6	0.5	Hirofumi Shii	Trot Thunder
Jul 7	Hanshin	Takarazuka Kinen	1	2,200 m (Firm)	13	7	6.2 (3)	3rd	2:12.3	0.3	Hirofumi Shii	Mayano Top Gun
Oct 6	Kyoto	Kyoto Daishoten	2	2,400 m (Firm)	14	14	6.5 (2)	4th	2:25.2	0.1	Hirofumi Shii	Marvelous Sunday
Nov 10	Kyoto	QE II Cup	1	2,200 m (Firm)	16	15	2.4 (1)	1st	2:14.3	0.0	Hirofumi Shii	(Fair Dance)
Nov 24	Tokyo	Japan Cup	1	2,400 m (Firm)	15	12	13.6 (6)	10th	2:25.6	1.8	Hirofumi Shii	Singspiel
Dec 22	Nakayama	Arima Kinen	1	2,500 m (Firm)	14	14	46.2 (12)	6th	2:35.2	1.4	Hirofumi Shii	Sakura Laurel
1997 – five-year-old season
Apr 13	Sha Tin	QE II Cup (HK)	OP	2,000 m (Firm)	14	14	18.0 (4)	8th	2:01.6	1.3	Hirofumi Shii	London News
Jun 15	Hanshin	Naruo Kinen	2	2,000 m (Firm)	15	15	11.3 (4)	3rd	2:01.8	0.4	Hiroshi Kawachi	Bubble Gum Fellow
Jul 6	Hanshin	Takarazuka Kinen	1	2,200 m (Firm)	12	5	18.7 (4)	3rd	2:12.1	0.2	Hiroshi Kawachi	Marvelous Sunday
Oct 5	Kyoto	Kyoto Daishoten	2	2,400 m (Firm)	10	3	2.0 (1)	2nd	2:26.2	0.0	Hiroshi Kawachi	Silk Justice
Nov 9	Kyoto	QE II Cup	1	2,200 m (Firm)	15	3	1.4 (1)	2nd	2:12.5	0.0	Hiroshi Kawachi	Erimo Chic
Dec 21	Nakayama	Arima Kinen	1	2,500 m (Firm)	16	2	10.9 (5)	14th	2:38.8	4.0	Hiroshi Kawachi	Silk Justice

Legend:
Turf

== Retirement ==
Dance Partner was retired from racing to become a broodmare at Shadai Farm. She has produced eleven foals, including Federalist who won the Nakayama Kimpai and the Nakayama Kinen in 2012.

Through her daughter Dance All Night, Dance Partner is a great granddam of Kamunyak, a winner of the 2025 Yushun Himba, a race that Dance Partner won 30 years earlier.

On October 14, 2016, Dance Partner died at the Shadai Farm due to laminitis.

=== Breeding record ===
c = colt, f = filly, g = gelding

No.	Name	Year	Sex	Color	Sire	Wins	Races	Remarks
1st	Royal Partner	1999	f	Bay	Helissio	3	35	Retired, broodmare
2nd	Dream Partner	2000	g	Bay	Helissio	4	46	Retired
	(not foaled)	2001			El Condor Pasa			
	(not foaled)	2002			El Condor Pasa			
3rd	Dance All Night	2003	f	Bay	El Condor Pasa	5	36	Retired, broodmare
	(not foaled)	2004			French Deputy			
4th	Mambo Partner	2005	g	Brown	Kingmambo	9	95	Retired
5th	Smarty Dance	2006	f	Chestnut	Smarty Jones	1	11	Retired, broodmare
6th	Federalist	2007	c	Dark Bay	Empire Maker	7	16	Retired, breeding stallion
	(not foaled)	2008						
7th	Longing Dancer	2009	c	Dark Bay	Symboli Kris S	7	45	Retired, breeding stallion
8th	Laka	2010	f	Bay	King Kamehameha	0	18	Retired, broodmare
9th	Reign Over	2011	g	Brown	King Kamehameha	6	33	Retired
10th	Key for Success	2012	c	Dark Bay	King Kamehameha	9	71	Retired
	(abortion)				King Kamehameha			
11th	Best Dance	2014	c	Dark Bay	Workforce	6	50	Retired, riding horse
	(not foaled)	2015			Harbinger			

== Pedigree ==
Pedigree of Dance Partner (JPN), bay mare 1992
Sire Sunday Silence (USA) 1986	Halo (USA); 1969	Hail to Reason	Turn-To
Sire Sunday Silence (USA) 1986	Halo (USA); 1969	Hail to Reason	Nothirdchance
Sire Sunday Silence (USA) 1986	Halo (USA); 1969	Cosmah	Cosmic Bomb
Sire Sunday Silence (USA) 1986	Halo (USA); 1969	Cosmah	Almahmoud
Sire Sunday Silence (USA) 1986	Wishing Well (USA); 1975	Understanding	Promised Land
Sire Sunday Silence (USA) 1986	Wishing Well (USA); 1975	Understanding	Pretty Ways
Sire Sunday Silence (USA) 1986	Wishing Well (USA); 1975	Mountain Flower	Montparnasse
Sire Sunday Silence (USA) 1986	Wishing Well (USA); 1975	Mountain Flower	Edelweiss
Dam Dancing Key (USA) 1983	Nijinsky (CAN); 1967	Northern Dancer	Nearctic
Dam Dancing Key (USA) 1983	Nijinsky (CAN); 1967	Northern Dancer	Natalma
Dam Dancing Key (USA) 1983	Nijinsky (CAN); 1967	Flaming Page	Bull Page
Dam Dancing Key (USA) 1983	Nijinsky (CAN); 1967	Flaming Page	Flaring Top
Dam Dancing Key (USA) 1983	Key Partner (USA); 1976	Key to the Mint	Graustark
Dam Dancing Key (USA) 1983	Key Partner (USA); 1976	Key to the Mint	Key Bridge
Dam Dancing Key (USA) 1983	Key Partner (USA); 1976	Native Partner	Raise A Native
Dam Dancing Key (USA) 1983	Key Partner (USA); 1976	Native Partner	Dinner Partner (Family 7)
