= Sunny Brian =

Japanese Thoroughbred racehorse (1994–2011)

Sunny Brian サニーブライアン
- Breed: Thoroughbred
- Sire: Brian's Time
- Grandsire: Roberto
- Dam: Sunny Swift
- Damsire: Swift Swallow
- Sex: Stallion
- Foaled: 23 April 1994
- Died: 3 March 2011 (aged 16)
- Country: Japan
- Color: Bay
- Breeder: Murashita Farm
- Owner: Moriyasu Miyazaki
- Racing colours
- Trainer: Senji Nakao
- Jockey: Naohiro Onishi
- Record: 10: 4-1-1
- Earnings: ¥340,306,000

Major wins
- Japanese Classic Race wins: Satsuki Shō (1997); Tōkyō Yūshun (1997)

Awards
- JRA Award for Best Three-Year-Old Colt (1997)

Sunny Brian (サニーブライアン, Hepburn: Sanī Buraian, 23 April 1994 – 3 March 2011) was a Japanese Thoroughbred racehorse who won the first two legs of Japanese Classic Races, the Satsuki Shō and the Tōkyō Yūshun in 1997. He had a total earnings of ¥340,306,000 before his retirement.

== Background ==
Born on April 23, 1994, Sunny Brian was a bay horse foaled by Sunny Swift, a Japanese racemare with the same owner as his, Moriyasu Miyazaki. He was sired by Brian's Time, an American-bred racehorse who also sired notable Japanese racehorses such as Narita Brian, Mayano Top Gun, and Tanino Gimlet.

== Racing Career ==
=== 1996: Two-year-old season ===
Sunny Brian debuted on October 5 at the Tokyo Racecourse. Ridden by Naohiro Onishi, he finished first by two and a half lengths. On his next three races, his performance dropped suddenly and failed to place, finishing fifth, seventh, and fifth once again.

=== 1997: Three-year-old season ===
His next season started when he competed in Wakatake Sho, an allowance race, placing second. At the Junior Cup, he finally secured a win once again, finishing with a time of 2:03.07 by half a length. In the Hochi Hai Yayoi Sho, he placed third with three and a half lengths behind the second place, Osumi Sunday. On the Wakaba Stakes, he placed fourth despite being the most popular horse.

At the Classics, he placed first in the Satsuki Shō, winning against Silk Lightning by a neck. However, in the Tōkyō Yūshun, he was unusually unpopular for a horse who won the Satsuki Shō, where he was only the sixth favorite. Despite this, he broke the fans' low expectations and managed to win by a length, becoming the youngest Derby winner.

== Race Records ==
The table below from netkeiba and JBIS shows his overall racing career. In his 10 starts, he won four races.

Date	Track	Race	Grade	Distance	Surface (Condition)	BK (PP)	Entry	Odds (Favored)	Finish	Time	Margin	Jockey	Winner (Runner-up)
1996 – two-year-old season
Oct 5	Tokyo	2YO Debut		1800m	Turf (Firm)	6 (8)	13	5.2 (3)	1st	1:50.4	-0.4	Naohiro Onishi	(Scholarship)
Nov 2	Tokyo	Hyakunichiso Tokubetsu	ALW (1 Win)	1800m	Turf (Soft)	5 (6)	12	3.5 (2)	5th	1:50.3	0.9	Naohiro Onishi	Kris the Brave
Nov 17	Tokyo	Fuchu Sansai Stakes	G3	1800m	Turf (Firm)	2 (2)	13	7.4 (2)	7th	1:50.6	0.9	Naohiro Onishi	Godspeed
Dec 15	Nakayama	Hiiragi Sho	ALW (1 Win)	1600m	Turf (Firm)	6 (11)	15	14.5 (3)	5th	1:37.0	0.8	Naohiro Onishi	Speed World
1997 – three-year-old season
Jan 6	Nakayama	Wakatake Sho	ALW (1 Win)	2000m	Turf (Soft)	4 (7)	16	5.7 (4)	2nd	2:04.7	0.1	Naohiro Onishi	Funnel Mark
Jan 18	Nakayama	Junior Cup	OP	2000m	Turf (Firm)	3 (3)	7	5.2 (4)	1st	2:03.7	-0.1	Naohiro Onishi	(Tokio Excellent)
Mar 2	Nakayama	Hochi Hai Yayoi Sho	G2	2000m	Turf (Firm)	3 (4)	14	15.5 (5)	3rd	2:03.1	1.1	Naohiro Onishi	Running Gale
Mar 22	Nakayama	Wakaba Stakes	OP	2000m	Turf (Soft)	1 (1)	16	3.5 (1)	4th	2:04.3	0.4	Naohiro Onishi	Silk Lightning
Apr 13	Nakayama	Satsuki Shō	G1	2000m	Turf (Firm)	8 (18)	18	51.8 (11)	1st	2:02.0	-0.1	Naohiro Onishi	(Silk Lightning)
Jun 1	Tokyo	Tōkyō Yūshun	G1	2400m	Turf (Firm)	8 (18)	17	13.6 (6)	1st	2:25.9	-0.2	Naohiro Onishi	(Silk Justice)

== Stud Career ==
During his 10 years as a stallion, he sired a total of 364 horses. Although not as remarkable as his father, two of his leading progeny—Gran Rio and Kazeni Fukarete, were both G3 winners. He was later castrated before retiring.

== Retirement and Death ==
After his stud duties, he retired at the end of 2007 at the Yushun Village AERU located in Urakawa, Hokkaido. As the youngest Derby winner, he was reported to have many visitors, which were horse racing fans.

Moreover, he was often found alone in his pasture, distancing himself from other horses—Nippo Teio, Dai Yusaku, and Winning Ticket. He was described as gentle and usually very docile, though sometimes bites when groomed.

He later died of colic on March 3, 2011.

== Pedigree ==
Pedigree of Sunny Brian, bay horse, 1994
Sire Brian's Time dk.b. 1985	Roberto b. 1969	Hail To Reason	Turn-To
Sire Brian's Time dk.b. 1985	Roberto b. 1969	Hail To Reason	Nothirdchance
Sire Brian's Time dk.b. 1985	Roberto b. 1969	Bramalea	Nashua
Sire Brian's Time dk.b. 1985	Roberto b. 1969	Bramalea	Rarelea
Sire Brian's Time dk.b. 1985	Kelley's Day b. 1977	Graustark	Ribot
Sire Brian's Time dk.b. 1985	Kelley's Day b. 1977	Graustark	Flower Bowl
Sire Brian's Time dk.b. 1985	Kelley's Day b. 1977	Golden Trail	Hasty Road
Sire Brian's Time dk.b. 1985	Kelley's Day b. 1977	Golden Trail	Sunny Vale
Dam Sunny Swift b. 1988	Swift Swallow b. 1977	Northern Dancer	Nearctic
Dam Sunny Swift b. 1988	Swift Swallow b. 1977	Northern Dancer	Natalma
Dam Sunny Swift b. 1988	Swift Swallow b. 1977	Homeward Bound	Alycidon
Dam Sunny Swift b. 1988	Swift Swallow b. 1977	Homeward Bound	Sabie River
Dam Sunny Swift b. 1988	Sunny Roman b. 1974	Faberge	Princely Gift
Dam Sunny Swift b. 1988	Sunny Roman b. 1974	Faberge	Spring Offensive
Dam Sunny Swift b. 1988	Sunny Roman b. 1974	Final Queen	Final Score
Dam Sunny Swift b. 1988	Sunny Roman b. 1974	Final Queen	Tsuki Kawa
