= Silk Justice =

Japanese Thoroughbred racehorse (foaled 1994)

Silk Justice; シルクジャスティス
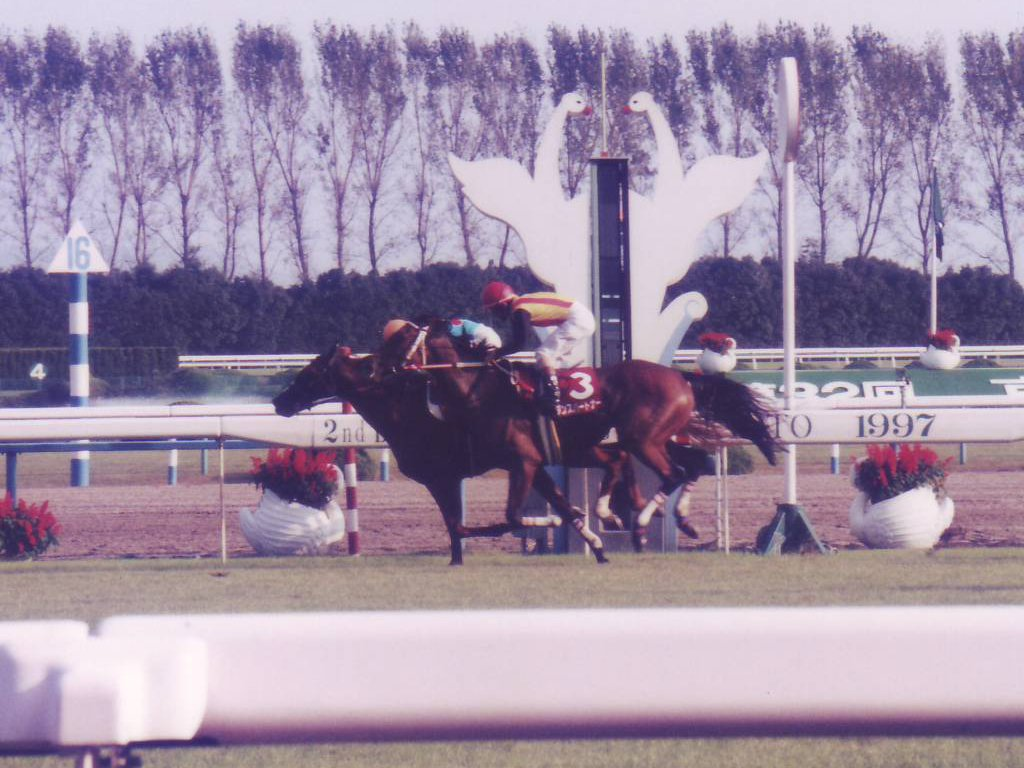
- Silk Justice (further) winning the 1997 Kyōto Daishōten (The horse to the front is Dance Partner)
- Breed: Thoroughbred
- Sire: Brian's Time
- Grandsire: Roberto
- Dam: Yuwa Meld
- Damsire: Satingo
- Sex: Stallion
- Foaled: 18 March 1994
- Died: 3 June 2019 (aged 25)
- Country: Japan
- Colour: Chestnut
- Breeder: Hayata Farm Niikappu Branch
- Owner: Silk Racing
- Racing colours
- Trainer: Masaya Okubo
- Jockey: Shinji Fujita; Yutaka Take; Yuichi Fukunaga; Mikio Matsunaga; Masayuki Fujii; Toru Kawakita
- Record: 27: 5-2-3
- Earnings: ¥457,970,000

Major wins
- Kyoto Yonsai Tokubetsu (1997); Kyōto Daishōten (1997); Arima Kinen (1997)

Silk Justice (Japanese: シルクジャスティス, Shiruku Jasutisu; 18 March 1994 – 3 June 2019) was a Japanese Thoroughbred racehorse and sire. He recorded five wins from twenty-seven starts between 1996 and 2000, including the Arima Kinen (GI) and the Kyōto Daishōten (GII) in 1997. He is best known for his victory in the 1997 Arima Kinen, where he defeated Marvelous Sunday and Air Groove, and for his close friendship with his stablemate Erimo Dandy.

== Background ==
Silk Justice was a chestnut stallion bred in Niikappu, Hokkaido, by the Hayata Farm Niikappu Branch. He was sired by Brian's Time, and his dam was Yuwa Meld, a mare by Satingo. He was owned by Silk Racing and trained by Masaya Okubo at the JRA's Ritto Training Center. His cousin, owned by the same connections, was Silk Lightning, who finished second in the 1997 Satsuki Shō.

== Racing career ==
=== 1996: two-year-old season ===
Silk Justice debuted on 12 October 1996 in a 2-year-old newcomer race over 1200 metres on turf at Kyoto Racecourse, finishing 11th. He ran twice more that year without winning.

=== 1997: three-year-old season ===
After three unplaced runs early in the year, he won his maiden race over 1800 metres on dirt at Hanshin Racecourse on 16 March, ridden by Yutaka Take. On 23 March, he finished third in the Mainichi Hai (GIII). He then won the Wakakusa Stakes (Open) and the Kyoto Yonsai Tokubetsu (GIII), the latter becoming the first of many rides aboard him by jockey Shinji Fujita. On 1 June, he contested the Tōkyō Yūshun (Japanese Derby) at Tokyo Racecourse. Starting 3rd favourite, he closed from the rear to finish second behind Sunny Brian.

In the autumn, he finished eighth in the Kobe Shimbun Hai (GII) before winning the Kyōto Daishōten (GII) at Kyoto, defeating the older mare Dance Partner. He then started 1st favourite in the Kikuka Shō (GI) but finished fifth, and finished fifth in the Japan Cup (GI). On 21 December, he contested the Arima Kinen (GI) at Nakayama Racecourse. Starting 4th favourite, he surged through the middle of the straight to defeat Marvelous Sunday and Air Groove, recording his first Grade 1 victory.

=== 1998: four-year-old season ===
Silk Justice began the year on 22 March in the Hanshin Daishōten (GII), finishing second by a nose to Mejiro Bright. He then finished fourth in the Tennō Shō (Spring) (GI) and sixth in the Takarazuka Kinen (GI). In the autumn, he finished third in the Kyōto Daishōten, eighth in the Tennō Shō (Autumn) (GI), eighth in the Japan Cup, and seventh in the Arima Kinen.

=== 1999: five-year-old season ===
He began the year with a sixth in the Nikkei Shinshun Hai (GII) and a fourth in the Hanshin Daishōten. On 2 May, he finished fourth in the Tennō Shō (Spring) behind Special Week. He subsequently suffered a fracture on his left fetlock from fatigue and was sidelined for a year.

=== 2000: six-year-old season ===
Silk Justice returned on 27 May 2000 in the Kinko Sho (GII) at Chukyo Racecourse, finishing 11th behind Meisho Doto. He was retired from racing immediately after the race.

== Race record ==
The following table details all 27 starts of Silk Justice's racing career based on official JBIS and netkeiba records. Record current as of his final start on 27 May 2000.

Date	Distance (Condition)	Race	Class	Course	Odds (Favourite)	Field	Finish	Time	Jockey	Winning (Losing) Margin	Winner (2nd Place)	Ref
1996 – two-year-old season
Oct 12	Turf 1200 m (Good)	2-Y-O Newcomer	Maiden	Kyoto	9.8 (3rd)	12	11th	1:12.2	Yutaka Take	2.2	Rugger Singer	
Oct 27	Dirt 1200 m (Good)	2-Y-O Newcomer	Maiden	Kyoto	26.2 (6th)	12	9th	1:15.7	Yuichi Fukunaga	3.2	Opening Theme	
Dec 7	Dirt 1200 m (Yielding)	2-Y-O Maiden	Maiden	Hanshin	8.0 (4th)	10	8th	1:16.9	Shinji Fujita	2.1	Eishin Forty	
1997 – three-year-old season
Jan 7	Dirt 1800 m (Good)	3-Y-O Maiden	Maiden	Kyoto	20.0 (8th)	15	5th	1:57.1	Masayuki Fujii	0.8	Kanetoshi Daian	
Jan 25	Dirt 1800 m (Heavy)	3-Y-O Maiden	Maiden	Kyoto	10.2 (4th)	12	2nd	1:52.9	Mikio Matsunaga	0.1	Boston Fox	
Mar 1	Dirt 1800 m (Heavy)	3-Y-O Maiden	Maiden	Hanshin	2.5 (1st)	13	3rd	1:56.7	Shinji Fujita	0.4	Victor Luminesce	
Mar 16	Dirt 1800 m (Heavy)	3-Y-O Maiden	Maiden	Hanshin	1.4 (1st)	8	1st	1:53.9	Yutaka Take	–0.2	(Arab no Oji)	
Mar 23	Turf 2000 m (Good)	Mainichi Hai	GIII	Hanshin	64.0 (12th)	14	3rd	2:03.5	Toru Kawakita	0.2	T.M.Top Dan	
Apr 12	Turf 2200 m (Good)	Wakakusa Stakes	Open	Hanshin	3.3 (2nd)	10	1st	2:14.8	Yutaka Take	–0.3	(Bourbon Country)	
May 4	Turf 2000 m (Good)	Kyoto Yonsai Tokubetsu	GIII	Kyoto	3.3 (1st)	15	1st	2:01.1	Shinji Fujita	–0.1	(Premium Thunder)	
Jun 1	Turf 2400 m (Good)	Tōkyō Yūshun	GI	Tokyo	6.2 (3rd)	17	2nd	2:26.1	Shinji Fujita	0.2	Sunny Brian	
Sep 14	Turf 2000 m (Good)	Kobe Shimbun Hai	GII	Hanshin	4.1 (3rd)	11	8th	2:02.0	Shinji Fujita	2.0	Matikanefukukitaru	
Oct 5	Turf 2400 m (Good)	Kyōto Daishōten	GII	Kyoto	3.3 (2nd)	10	1st	2:26.2	Shinji Fujita	–0.0	(Dance Partner)	
Nov 2	Turf 3000 m (Good)	Kikuka Shō	GI	Kyoto	2.7 (1st)	18	5th	3:08.1	Shinji Fujita	0.4	Matikanefukukitaru	
Nov 23	Turf 2400 m (Good)	Japan Cup	GI	Tokyo	7.0 (4th)	14	5th	2:26.2	Shinji Fujita	0.4	Pilsudski	
Dec 21	Turf 2500 m (Good)	Arima Kinen	GI	Nakayama	8.1 (4th)	16	1st	2:34.8	Shinji Fujita	–0.0	(Marvelous Sunday)	
1998 – four-year-old season
Mar 22	Turf 3000 m (Good)	Hanshin Daishōten	GII	Hanshin	2.5 (2nd)	10	2nd	3:09.3	Shinji Fujita	0.0	Mejiro Bright	
May 3	Turf 3200 m (Good)	Tennō Shō (Spring)	GI	Kyoto	2.0 (1st)	14	4th	3:24.1	Shinji Fujita	0.5	Mejiro Bright	
Jul 12	Turf 2200 m (Good)	Takarazuka Kinen	GI	Hanshin	5.7 (4th)	13	6th	2:12.4	Shinji Fujita	0.5	Silence Suzuka	
Oct 11	Turf 2400 m (Good)	Kyoto Daishōten	GII	Kyoto	4.3 (3rd)	7	3rd	2:26.0	Shinji Fujita	0.4	Seiun Sky	
Nov 1	Turf 2000 m (Good)	Tennō Shō (Autumn)	GI	Tokyo	8.4 (3rd)	12	8th	2:00.4	Shinji Fujita	1.1	Offside Trap	
Nov 29	Turf 2400 m (Good)	Japan Cup	GI	Tokyo	11.7 (5th)	15	8th	2:27.2	Shinji Fujita	1.3	El Condor Pasa	
Dec 27	Turf 2500 m (Good)	Arima Kinen	GI	Nakayama	19.8 (6th)	16	7th	2:33.0	Shinji Fujita	0.9	Grass Wonder	
1999 – five-year-old season
Jan 24	Turf 2400 m (Good)	Nikkei Shinshun Hai	GII	Kyoto	6.6 (3rd)	12	6th	2:31.7	Shinji Fujita	0.3	Mejiro Bright	
Mar 21	Turf 3000 m (Heavy)	Hanshin Daishōten	GII	Hanshin	12.4 (3rd)	9	4th	3:15.1	Shinji Fujita	1.7	Special Week	
May 2	Turf 3200 m (Good)	Tennō Shō (Spring)	GI	Kyoto	22.6 (5th)	12	4th	3:15.8	Shinji Fujita	0.5	Special Week	
2000 – six-year-old season
May 27	Turf 2000 m (Yielding)	Kinko Sho	GII	Chukyo	32.8 (6th)	11	11th	2:00.7	Shinji Fujita	2.2	Meisho Doto	

== Stud career ==
Silk Justice entered stud in 2001 at CB Stud, before moving to the Niikappu Agricultural Cooperative in 2003 and Yushun Stallion Station in 2004. In 2006, he was transferred to Hatakeyama Farm. He was retired from stud duty in 2010. His most notable offspring was Bashi Ken, who won the Nakayama Daishogai in 2010, shortly after Justice's retirement from stud.

Foaled	Name	Sex	Major wins
2004	Bashi Ken	c	Nakayama Daishogai

c = colt, f = filly

== After stud career ==
Following his retirement from stud duty, Silk Justice remained at Hatakeyama Farm where he was pensioned. He died of old age on 3 June 2019 at the age of 25.

== Pedigree ==
Pedigree of Silk Justice (JPN)
Sire Brian's Time (USA) 1985	Roberto (USA); 1969	Hail to Reason	Turn-to
Sire Brian's Time (USA) 1985	Roberto (USA); 1969	Hail to Reason	Nothirdchance
Sire Brian's Time (USA) 1985	Roberto (USA); 1969	Bramalea	Nashua
Sire Brian's Time (USA) 1985	Roberto (USA); 1969	Bramalea	Rarelea
Sire Brian's Time (USA) 1985	Kelley's Day (USA); 1977	Graustark	Ribot
Sire Brian's Time (USA) 1985	Kelley's Day (USA); 1977	Graustark	Flower Bowl
Sire Brian's Time (USA) 1985	Kelley's Day (USA); 1977	Golden Trail	Hasty Road
Sire Brian's Time (USA) 1985	Kelley's Day (USA); 1977	Golden Trail	Sunny Vale
Dam Yuwa Meld (JPN) 1983	Satingo (FR); 1970	Petingo	Petition
Dam Yuwa Meld (JPN) 1983	Satingo (FR); 1970	Petingo	Alcazar
Dam Yuwa Meld (JPN) 1983	Satingo (FR); 1970	Saquebute	Klairon
Dam Yuwa Meld (JPN) 1983	Satingo (FR); 1970	Saquebute	Synaldo
Dam Yuwa Meld (JPN) 1983	Peach Girl (JPN); 1976	Sedan	Prince Bio
Dam Yuwa Meld (JPN) 1983	Peach Girl (JPN); 1976	Sedan	Staffa
Dam Yuwa Meld (JPN) 1983	Peach Girl (JPN); 1976	Merry Brat	Tesco Boy
Dam Yuwa Meld (JPN) 1983	Peach Girl (JPN); 1976	Merry Brat	Continental

- Silk Justice is outcrossed within the first five generations.

== See also ==
- Thoroughbred racing in Japan
