= Mayano Top Gun =

Japanese-bred Thoroughbred racehorse

Mayano Top Gun マヤノトップガン
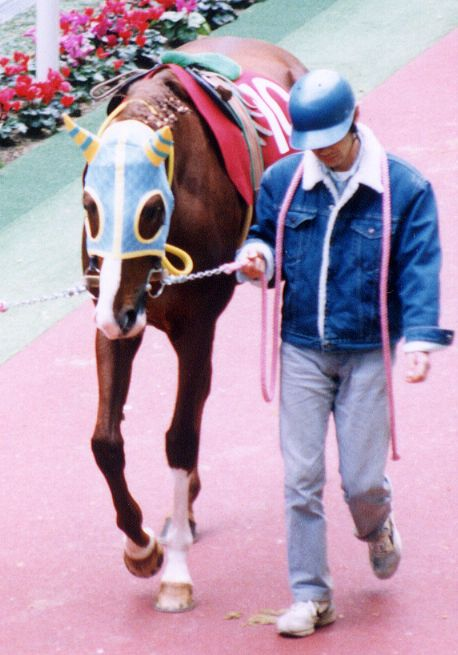
- Mayano Top Gun at the 1996 Hanshin Daishoten.
- Breed: Thoroughbred
- Sire: Brian's Time
- Grandsire: Roberto
- Dam: Alp Me Please
- Damsire: Blushing Groom
- Sex: Stallion
- Foaled: March 24, 1992
- Died: November 3, 2019 (aged 27)
- Country: Japan
- Colour: Chestnut
- Breeder: Etsuo Kawakami
- Owner: Yu Tadokoro
- Racing colours
- Trainer: Masahiro Sakaguchi
- Jockey: Yutaka Take; Seiki Tabara
- Record: 21: 8-4-5
- Earnings: ¥810,039,000

Major wins
- Arima Kinen (1995); Takarazuka Kinen (1996); Hanshin Daishoten (1997); Tenno Sho (Spring) (1997); Japanese Classic Race wins: Kikuka Sho (1995)

Awards
- Japanese Horse of the Year (1995); JRA Award for Best Three-Year-Old Colt (1995)

Mayano Top Gun (Japanese: マヤノトップガン, Hepburn: Mayano Toppu Gan; March 24, 1992 – November 3, 2019) was a Japanese Thoroughbred racehorse and sire. His wins included the Kikuka Sho, Arima Kinen, Takarazuka Kinen, Hanshin Daishoten and Tenno Sho. In the 1995 JRA Awards, he was declared the Japanese Horse of the Year and the Best Three-year-old Colt.

== Background ==
Mayano Top Gun was a chestnut horse with a white blaze and a long white stocking on his left foreleg bred in Japan by Etsuo Kawakami. He was sired by the American stallion Brian's Time, who finished second in the Preakness Stakes in 1988 before becoming a highly successful breeding stallion in Japan. His dam Alp Me Please was sired by Blushing Groom and was a half-sister of the Grand Prix de Paris winner Swink: as a descendant of the broodmare Sonrisa, she was also a distant relative of the Belmont Stakes winner Ruler on Ice.

His name came from the owner's crown name Mayano which was derived from Mount Maya in Kobe, Hyogo, and Top Gun, the 1986 American movie.

== Racing career ==
=== 1995: three-year-old season ===
Mayano Top Gun began his career racing on dirt and won three of his nine races in the early part of 1995. He was then switched to turf, being placed twice at both Kobe Shimbun Hai and Kyoto Shimbun Hai in September and October. He emerged as a top class performer in the late autumn in the Kikuka Sho. In the race, he was the third favourite behind Dance Partner and Narita King O. When the race began, he was chasing comfortably from a good position, was already close to the front by the fourth corner, and in the straight he pulled away from the rest of the pack to take the win by one and a quarter length over Tokai Palace and Hokkai Rousseau. In December, he contested one of Japan's most prestigious weight-for-age races, the Arima Kinen over 2500 metres at Nakayama. He pulled away early in the race, maintained that position throughout the race and won by two lengths from Taiki Blizzard and Sakura Chitose O.

=== 1996: four-year-old season ===
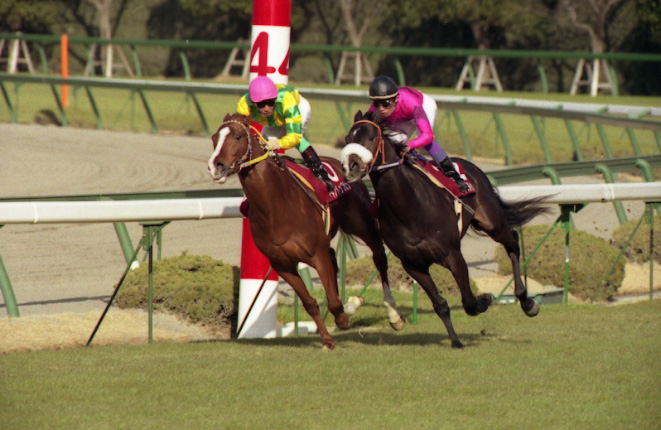
Mayano Top Gun and Narita Brian at the 1996 Hanshin Daishōten.

In March 1996, Mayano Top Gun was matched against the 1994 Japanese Horse of the Year Narita Brian in the Hanshin Daishoten and was beaten into second place. In June at Kyoto he recorded his biggest success as a four-year-old at the Takarazuka Kinen over 2200 metres. At the race, the thirteen starters battling it out closed the whole race. Mayano Top Gun himself was held back by Kanetsu Cross and Legacy World. At the final kilometer, Mayano Top Gun surged past both of those horses and held the position to win the race, beating Sunday Branch and the mare Dance Partner by a length and half. Later in the year he finished second to Bubble Gum Fellow in the autumn edition of the Tenno Sho where the three-year-old colt took the early lead and had the extra energy on the final straight over Mayano Top Gun and Sakura Laurel.

=== 1997: five-year-old season ===
In March 1997, Mayano Top Gun raced in the Hanshin Daishoten. His jockey, Seiki Tabara made a bold call to change the horse running strategy from early lead to final pursuit. On the race day, Mayano Top Gun stayed mostly at the back. Then, in the final stretch, he began to sprint in between the third and fourth corner. Entering the straight, he unleashed a powerful finishing kick and broke through for his first win of the season over Big Symbol and Gigaton. A month later he contested the Spring edition of the Tenno Sho over 3200 metres at Kyoto. This would be an epic battle between the three strongest older horses (Sakura Laurel, Marvelous Sunday and himself). Both Sakura Laurel and Marvelous Sunday took the lead at the ending phase but Mayano Top Gun, stuck to the strategy from previous race, chased after both in the final straight and crossed the line first. He won the race from Sakura Laurel (winner of the race in 1996), with Marvelous Sunday in third place and etched a new record finish at the time. Unfortunately, he had to retire right after the race as he developed tendonitis on his legs. A retirement ceremony was held at Hanshin Racecourse during the lunch break on November 30.

== Racing form ==
Mayano Top Gun won eight race out of 21 starts and snatched four G1 win during his career. This data available is based on JBIS and netkeiba.

Date	Track	Race	Grade	Distance (Condition)	Entry	HN	Odds (Favored)	Finish	Time	Margins	Jockey	Winner (Runner-up)
1995 – three-year-old season
Jan 8	Kyoto	3yo Newcomer		1,200 m (Fast)	16	13	1.7 (1)	5th	1:14.9	1.1	Yutaka Take	Wonder Perfume
Feb 19	Kyoto	3yo Maiden		1,200 m (Fast)	14	2	7.6 (4)	3rd	1:14.2	0.4	Seiki Tabara	Star Swallow
Mar 11	Kyoto	3yo Maiden		1,200 m (Good)	8	1	1.8 (1)	3rd	1:14.2	0.7	Yutaka Take	Polish Admiral
Mar 25	Kyoto	3yo Maiden		1,200 m (Fast)	14	2	2.0 (2)	1st	1:13.0	–0.2	Yutaka Take	(Land Zenobia)
Apr 15	Kyoto	3yo Allowance	1W	1,200 m (Sloppy)	14	6	6.8 (3)	3rd	1:12.6	0.3	Yutaka Take	Fusaichi Victory
May 7	Kyoto	3yo Allowance	1W	1,200 m (Fast)	11	4	5.2 (4)	3rd	1:12.1	0.6	Seiki Tabara	Wakana Ines
May 28	Chukyo	3yo Allowance	1W	1,700 m (Fast)	11	8	8.2 (4)	1st	1:46.8	–1.2	Seiki Tabara	(Kitasan Silver)
Jun 18	Chukyo	Royal HKJC Trophy		2,000 m (Firm)	13	13	15.3 (5)	3rd	2:01.3	0.1	Seiki Tabara	Fair Dance
Jul 9	Chukyo	Yamayuri Stakes		1,800 m (Firm)	16	2	5.2 (2)	1st	1:49.8	–0.2	Seiki Tabara	(Thrilling Hour)
Sep 17	Kyoto	Kobe Shimbun Hai	2	2,000 m (Firm)	14	14	13.5 (5)	2nd	1:59.8	0.0	Seiki Tabara	Tanino Create
Oct 15	Kyoto	Kyoto Shimbun Hai	2	2,200 m (Firm)	15	11	4.4 (2)	2nd	2:11.5	0.1	Seiki Tabara	Narita King O
Nov 5	Kyoto	Kikuka Sho	1	3,000 m (Firm)	18	10	6.5 (3)	1st	R3:04.4	–0.2	Seiki Tabara	(Tokai Palace)
Dec 24	Nakayama	Arima Kinen	1	2,500 m (Firm)	12	10	13.0 (6)	1st	2:33.6	–0.3	Seiki Tabara	(Taiki Blizzard)
1996 – four-year-old season
Mar 9	Hanshin	Hanshin Daishoten	2	3,000 m (Firm)	10	10	2.0 (1)	2nd	3:04.9	0.0	Seiki Tabara	Narita Brian
Apr 21	Kyoto	Tennō Shō (Spring)	1	3,200 m (Firm)	16	7	2.8 (2)	5th	3:18.8	1.0	Seiki Tabara	Sakura Laurel
Jul 7	Hanshin	Takarazuka Kinen	1	2,200 m (Firm)	13	9	2.0 (1)	1st	2:12.0	–0.2	Seiki Tabara	(Sunday Branch)
Sep 15	Nakayama	Sankei Sho All Comers	2	2,200 m (Soft)	9	6	1.8 (1)	4th	2:17.6	0.9	Seiki Tabara	Sakura Laurel
Oct 27	Tokyo	Tennō Shō (Autumn)	1	2,000 m (Firm)	17	8	8.1 (4)	2nd	1:58.8	0.1	Seiki Tabara	Bubble Gum Fellow
Dec 22	Nakayama	Arima Kinen	1	2,500 m (Firm)	14	3	5.9 (2)	7th	2:35.3	1.5	Seiki Tabara	Sakura Laurel
1997 – five-year-old season
Mar 16	Hanshin	Hanshin Daishoten	2	3,000 m (Good)	8	9	1.9 (1)	1st	3:07.2	–0.6	Seiki Tabara	(Big Symbol)
Apr 27	Kyoto	Tennō Shō (Spring)	1	3,200 m (Firm)	16	4	3.7 (2)	1st	R3:14.4	–0.2	Seiki Tabara	(Sakura Laurel)

Legend:
Turf Dirt

- R on the time indicates that this was a record time

== Assessment and awards ==
In 1995, Mayano Top Gun was voted Japanese Horse of the Year and the Best Three-year-old Colt.

== Stud career and death ==
After retirement, Mayano Top Gun stand as a stud at Yushun Stallion Station in Niikappu, Hokkaido until he retired in 2015. He stayed there for the rest of his life until he died of old age on November 3, 2019, at 27 years old.

=== Major winners ===
c = colt, f = filly

Grade winners
Foaled	Name	Sex	Major Wins
1999	Bamboo Juventus	c	Nikkei Shinshun Hai
1999	Precise Machine	c	Swan Stakes, Hankyu Hai, Chunichi Shimbun Hai (2x)
2000	Chakra	c	Meguro Kinen, Stayers Stakes
2002	Hokko Pas de Chat	c	Niigata Kinen
2002	Meisho Tokon	c	Tokai Stakes, Breeders' Gold Cup, Heian Stakes, Nagoya Daishoten
2002	Top Gun Joe	c	Niigata Kinen, Epsom Cup
2003	King Top Gun	c	Meguro Kinen, Hakodate Kinen
2008	Mousquetaire	c	Meguro Kinen

== In popular culture ==
An anthropomorphized version of Mayano Top Gun appears as a character in the Japanese multimedia franchise Umamusume: Pretty Derby, voiced by Mio Hoshitani. She is depicted as a bubbly, rambunctious, and highly observant girl who wants to be treated like an adult, leading her to adopt whatever she perceives as "mature" behavior, such as by asking for romantic outings from the player trainer. The daughter of an aircraft pilot, she often incorporates aeronautical terms in her speech. She has a rivalry with Narita Brian and regularly pesters her, while Brian finds Mayano annoying but deep down is intrigued by her potential. She is one of the major characters featured in the Umamusume manga adaptation Umamusume: Pretty Derby – Star Blossom.

In August 2021, Cygames, the publisher of Umamusume: Pretty Derby and Paramount Pictures announced a collaboration in Japan between Umamusume: Pretty Derby and Top Gun: Maverick. Mayano Top Gun – whose real-life namesake was also named in part after the original 1986 Top Gun film – was named a special advertising pilot, and the collaboration featured her in an alternate version of the movie's poster, with Mio Hoshitani additionally interviewing some of the cast and crew of the movie.

== Pedigree ==
Pedigree of Mayano Top Gun (JPN), chestnut stallion
Sire Brian's Time	Roberto	Hail to Reason	Turn-to
Sire Brian's Time	Roberto	Hail to Reason	Nothirdchance
Sire Brian's Time	Roberto	Bramalea	Nashua
Sire Brian's Time	Roberto	Bramalea	Rarelea
Sire Brian's Time	Kelley's Day	Graustark	Ribot
Sire Brian's Time	Kelley's Day	Graustark	Flower Bowl
Sire Brian's Time	Kelley's Day	Golden Trail	Hasty Road
Sire Brian's Time	Kelley's Day	Golden Trail	Sunny Vale
Dam Alp Me Please	Blushing Groom	Red God	Nasrullah
Dam Alp Me Please	Blushing Groom	Red God	Spring Run
Dam Alp Me Please	Blushing Groom	Runaway Bride	Wild Risk
Dam Alp Me Please	Blushing Groom	Runaway Bride	Aimee
Dam Alp Me Please	Swiss	Vaguely Noble	Vienna
Dam Alp Me Please	Swiss	Vaguely Noble	Noble Lassie
Dam Alp Me Please	Swiss	Gala Host	My Host
Dam Alp Me Please	Swiss	Gala Host	Huspah (Family: 14-a)
