= Kyōto Daishōten =

Kyōto Daishōten 京都大賞典
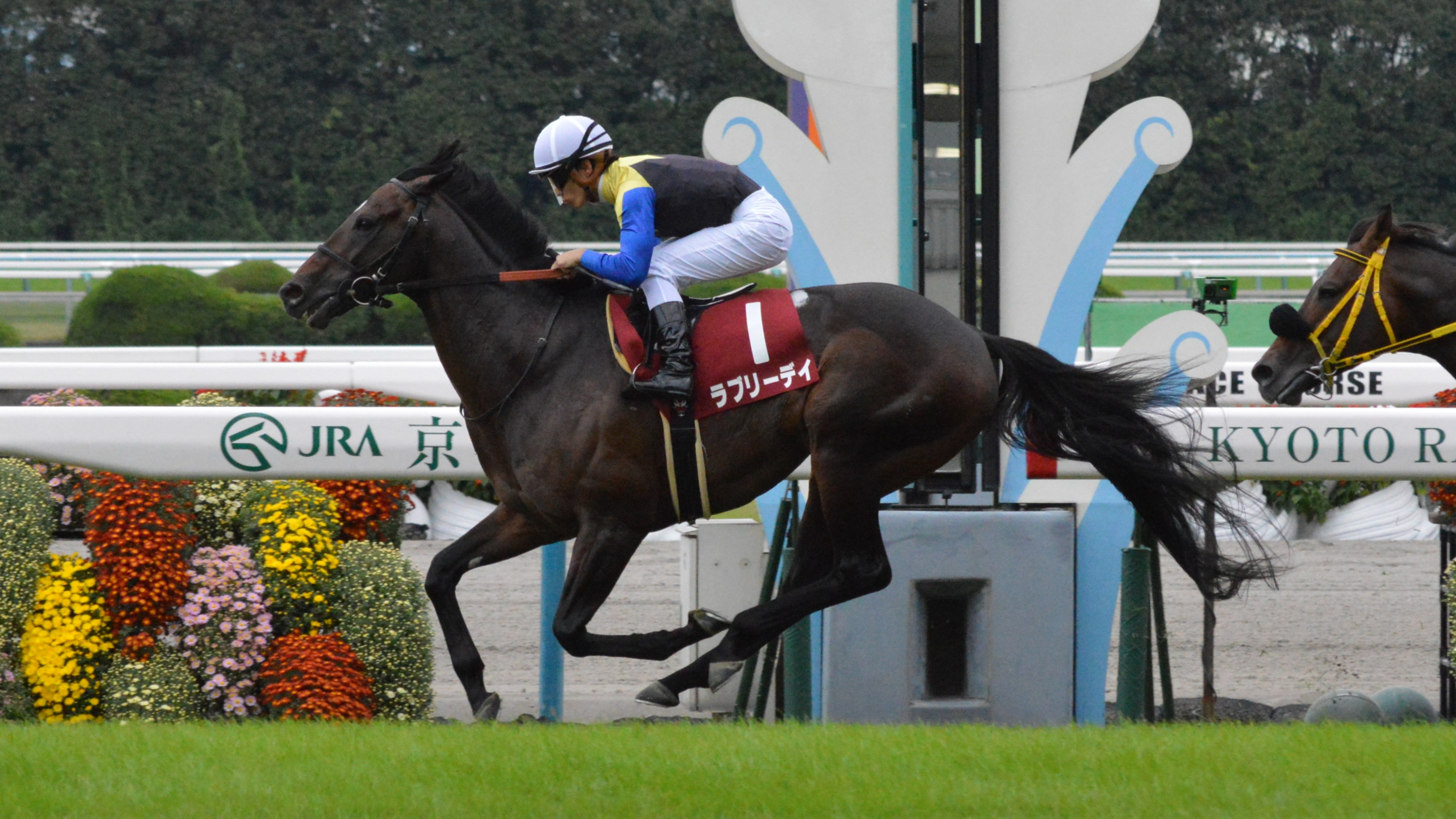
- Lovely Day winning the 2015 Kyoto Daishoten
- Class: Grade 2
- Location: Kyoto Racecourse, Fushimi-ku, Kyoto
- Inaugurated: 1966
- Race type: Thoroughbred Flat racing

Race information
- Distance: 2400 metres
- Surface: Turf
- Track: Right-handed
- Qualification: 3-y-o +, Colts & Fillies
- Weight: Special Weight
- Purse: ¥ 145,220,000 (as of 2025): 1st: ¥ 67,000,000; 2nd: ¥ 27,000,000; 3rd: ¥ 17,000,000

The Kyōto Daishōten (京都大賞典, kyōto daishōten) is a Grade 2 flat horse race in Japan for Thoroughbred colts and fillies aged three and over. It is run over a distance of 2,400 metres at the Kyoto Racecourse, in Fushimi-ku, Kyoto.

The race is run in October and serves as a trial race for the autumn edition of the Tenno Sho.

It was first run in 1966. Among the winners of the race have been multiple prominent racehorses, including Mejiro McQueen, Marvelous Crown, T. M. Opera O, Tap Dance City, Rose Kingdom and Lovely Day.

== Weight ==
54 kg for three-year-olds, 57 kg for four-year-olds and above.

Allowances:

- 2 kg for fillies / mares
- 2 kg for southern hemisphere bred three-year-olds

Penalties (excluding two-year-old race performance):

- If a graded stakes race has been won within a year:
  - 2 kg for a grade 1 win (1 kg for fillies / mares)
  - 1 kg for a grade 2 win
- If a graded stakes race has been won for more than a year:
  - 1 kg for a grade 1 win

== Records ==
Speed record:

- 2:22.7 Mejiro McQueen - 1993

Most successful horse (2 wins):

- Tanino Chikara – 1973, 1974
- Yamano Shiragiku – 1983, 1985
- Suzuka Koban – 1984, 1986
- Super Creek – 1989, 1990
- Mejiro McQueen – 1991, 1993
- T. M. Opera O – 2000, 2001

== Winners since 1994 ==
Year	Winner	Age	Jockey	Trainer	Owner	Time
1994	Marvelous Crown	4	Katsumi Minai	Makoto Osawa	Sadao Sasahara	2:31.0
1995	Hishi Amazon	4	Eiji Nakdate	Takao Nakano	Masaichiro Abe	2:25.3
1996	Marvelous Sunday	4	Yutaka Take	Makoto Osawa	Sadao Sasahara	2:25.1
1997	Silk Justice	3	Shinji Fujita	Masaaki Okubo	Silk	2:26.2
1998	Seiun Sky	3	Norihiro Yokoyama	Kazutaka Yasuda	Masayuki Nishiyama	2:25.6
1999	Tsurumaru Tsuyoshi	4	Shinji Fujita	Nibun Hisao	Takao Tsuruta	2:24.3
2000	T. M. Opera O	4	Ryuji Wada	Ichizo Iwamoto	Masatsugu Takezono	2:26.0
2001	T. M. Opera O^{[a]}	5	Ryuji Wada	Ichizo Iwamoto	Masatsugu Takezono	2:25.0
2002	Narita Top Road	6	Hirofumi Shii	Yoshio Oki	Hidenori Yamaji	2:23.6
2003	Tap Dance City	6	Tetsuzo Sato	Shozo Sasaki	Yushun Horse Club	2:26.6
2004	Narita Century	5	Hirokazu Tajima	Norio Fujisawa	Hidenori Yamaji	2:25.2
2005	Lincoln	5	Yutaka Take	Hidetaka Otonashi	Hideko Kondo	2:25.4
2006	Sweep Tosho	5	Kenichi Ikezoe	Akio Tsurudome	Tosho Sangyo	2:31.5
2007	Inti Raimi	5	Tetsuzo Sato	Shozo Sasaki	Sunday Racing	2:24.8
2008	Toho Alan	5	Ryota Sameshima	Hideaki Fujiwara	Toho Bussan	2:26.9
2009	Oken Bruce Lee	4	Hiroyuki Uchida	Hidetaka Otonashi	Akira Fukui	2:24.3
2010	Meisho Beluga	5	Kenichi Ikezoe	Kaneo Ikezoe	Yoshio Matsumoto	2:25.0
2011	Rose Kingdom	4	Hiroki Goto	Kojiro Hashiguchi	Sunday Racing	2:24.1
2012	Meisho Kampaku	5	Kenichi Ikezoe	Yoshiyuki Arakawa	Yoshio Matsumoto	2:23.4
2013	Hit The Target	5	Yuichi Kitamura	Keiji Kato	Shinji Maeda	2:22.9
2014	Last Impact	4	Yuga Kawada	Hiroyoshi Matsuda	Silk Racing	2:24.2
2015	Lovely Day	5	Yuga Kawada	Yasutoshi Ikee	Kaneko Makoto Holdings	2:23.6
2016	Kitasan Black	4	Yutaka Take	Hisashi Shimizu	Ono Shoji	2:25.5
2017	Smart Layer	7	Yutaka Take	Ryuji Okubo	Toru Okawa	2:23.0
2018	Satono Diamond	5	Yuga Kawada	Yasutoshi Ikee	Satomi Horse Company	2:25.4
2019	Dreadnoughtus	6	Ryusei Sakai	Yoshito Yahagi	Carrot Farm	2:23.5
2020	Glory Vase	5	Yuga Kawada	Tomohito Ozeki	Carrot Farm	2:25.6
2021^{[b]}	Makahiki	8	Kota Fujioka	Yasuo Tomomichi	Kaneko Makoto Holdings	2:24.5
2022^{[b]}	Vela Azul	5	Kohei Matsuyama	Kunihiko Watanabe	Carrot Farm	2:24.3
2023	Pradaria	4	Kenichi Ikezoe	Manabu Ikezoe	Nagoya Yuho	2:25.3
2024	Chevalier Rose	6	Yuichi Kitamura	Hisashi Shimizu	Carrot Farm Co. Ltd.	2:22.9
2025	Deep Monster	7	Suguru Hamanaka	Yasutoshi Ikee	DMM Dream Club Co. Ltd.	2:23.9
2026	Ecoro Dinos	4	Kanta Taguchi	Ryuji Okubo	Masatoshi Haramura	2:24.0

^{a} Stay Gold came in first in the 2001 edition of the race. However, as he had cut off Narita Top Road and caused his jockey to fall, he was disqualified from the race.

^{b} The 2021 and 2022 runnings took place at Hanshin while Kyoto was closed for redevelopment.

== Earlier winners ==
- 1966 - Kyoei Hikari
- 1967 - Shibafuji
- 1968 - Marchs
- 1969 - Finis
- 1970 - New Kiminonawa
- 1971 - Mejiro Asama
- 1972 - Kimusu Vimy
- 1973 - Tanino Chikara
- 1974 - Tanino Chikara
- 1975 - Ishino Masaru
- 1976 - Passing Venture
- 1977 - Ten Point
- 1978 - Ryu Kiko
- 1979 - Tenmei
- 1980 - Silksky
- 1981 - Inado Kotobuki
- 1982 - Mejiro Chara
- 1983 - Yamano Shiragiku
- 1984 - Suzuka Koban
- 1985 - Yamano Shiragiku
- 1986 - Suzuka Koban
- 1987 - Tokai Roman
- 1988 - Meisho Eikan
- 1989 - Super Creek
- 1990 - Super Creek
- 1991 - Mejiro McQueen
- 1992 - Osumi Roch
- 1993 - Mejiro McQueen

== See also ==
- Horse racing in Japan
- List of Japanese flat horse races
