= JRA Award for Best Jockey (races won) =

Award issued by the Japan Racing Association

The JRA Award for Best Jockey (races won) is an award given to registered jockeys in Japan with most wins in Japanese Thoroughbred racing. It is annually given by Japan Racing Association (JRA).

== Records ==
Most wins (18 wins)

- Yutaka Take – 1989, 1990, 1992, 1993, 1994, 1995, 1996, 1997, 1998, 1999, 2000, 2002, 2003, 2004, 2005, 2006, 2007, 2008

Most consecutive wins (9 wins)

- Yutaka Take – 1992–2000

== Recipients ==
Year	Jockey	Wins
1987	Yukio Okabe	138
1988	Masato Shibata	132
1989	Yutaka Take	133
1990	Yutaka Take	116
1991	Yukio Okabe	128
1992	Yutaka Take	130
1993	Yutaka Take	137
1994	Yutaka Take	134
1995	Yutaka Take	134
1996	Yutaka Take	159
1997	Yutaka Take	168
1998	Yutaka Take	169
1999	Yutaka Take	178
2000	Yutaka Take	130
2001	Masayoshi Ebina	133
2002	Yutaka Take	133
2003	Yutaka Take	204
2004	Yutaka Take	211
2005	Yutaka Take	210
2006	Yutaka Take	178
2007	Yutaka Take	156
2008	Yutaka Take	143
2009	Hiroyuki Uchida	146
2010	Norihiro Yokoyama	120
2011	Yuichi Fukunaga	133
2012	Suguru Hamanaka	131
2013	Yuichi Fukunaga	131
2014	Keita Tosaki	146
2015	Keita Tosaki	130
2016	Keita Tosaki	187
2017	Christophe Lemaire	199
2018	Christophe Lemaire	215
2019	Christophe Lemaire	164
2020	Christophe Lemaire	204
2021	Christophe Lemaire	199
2022	Yuga Kawada	143
2023	Christophe Lemaire	165
2024	Christophe Lemaire	176
2025	Christophe Lemaire	140

== See also ==
- JRA Award
- JRA Award for Best Jockey (winning average)
- JRA Award for Best Jockey (money earned)
- JRA Award for Best Steeplechase Jockey
- JRA Award for Best Jockey (newcomer)
- JRA Grand Prize Jockey
- Most Valuable Jockey
