= Tanino Gimlet =

Japanese-bred Thoroughbred racehorse

Tanino Gimlet タニノギムレット
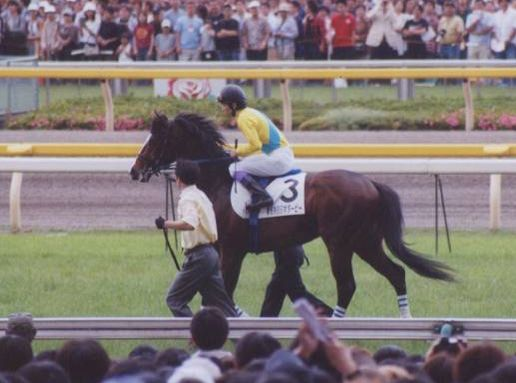
- Tanino Gimlet, May 26, 2002, at Tokyo Racecourse
- Breed: Thoroughbred
- Sire: Brian's Time (USA)
- Grandsire: Roberto (USA)
- Dam: Tanino Crystal (JPN)
- Damsire: Crystal Palace (FR)
- Sex: Stallion
- Foaled: May 4, 1999 (age 27)
- Country: Japan
- Color: Bay
- Breeder: Country Bokujo
- Owner: Yuzo Tanimizu
- Racing colors
- Trainer: Kunihide Matsuda
- Jockey: Hirofumi Shii; Yutaka Take
- Record: 8: 5-1-2
- Earnings: ¥386,010,000

Major wins
- Shinzan Kinen (2002); Arlington Cup (2002); Spring Stakes (2002); Japanese Classic Race wins: Tokyo Yushun (2002)

Tanino Gimlet (Japanese: タニノギムレット, Hepburn: Tanino Gimuretto; foaled May 4, 1999) is a retired Japanese Thoroughbred racehorse sired by Brian's Time, out of Tanino Crystal. He sired many winning horses, including Vodka.

== Background ==
Tanino Gimlet was born in Urakawa, Hokkaido. He is a bay stallion with a white blaze sired by Brian's Time, out of Tanino Crystal. He was a racehorse from August 2001 until May 2002, before retiring to become a breeding stud.

== Racing career ==
He debuted at the Sapporo Racecourse, taking second place. Afterwards, some of his other major wins were at the Arlington Cup, and Fuji TV Sho Spring Stakes. Gimlet also won at the Tokyo Racecourse at the Tokyo Yushun (Japanese Derby), with jockey Yutaka Take mounting him.

=== 2002: three-year-old season and retirement ===
In Tanino Gimlet's first two races as a three year old, he won the Shinzan Kinen as well as the Arlington Cup.

In the trial race leading up to the Satsuki Sho, the Spring Stakes, Yoni Hirofumi replaced an injured Yutaka Take. Tanino Gimlet won by a neck in the race.

At the Satsuki Sho, Tanino Gimlet was the favourite coming into the race, once again jockeyed by Yoni. However, in the race, he lost time by going wide into the last corner, and despite showing impressive speed and overtaking most horses in the straight, he was unable to pass the two horses ahead of him and finished third. The winner was the 15th-favorite, No Reason, who broke away from a good position. Yoni's rough riding at this time was often considered a clear jockey error, with commentators saying, "Tanino Gimlet was the only horse that ran 100 meters extra."

Following the Satsuki Sho, Tanino Gimlet entered the NHK Mile Cup with Yutaka Take at the helm returning after his injury. He was the favourite to win the race. As usual, he waited in the back and headed into the straight, but was at a disadvantage as Telegnosis's swerving blocked his path. He tried to catch up by changing course left and right, but finished third as Telegnosis won the race.

He continued to have a tight schedule with only two weeks between races, but his next race was the Tokyo Yushun. He was again the favorite, and after waiting in the back as usual, he turned towards the straight and unleashed an explosive run down the slope, overtaking Symboli Kris S to win by a length. Yutaka Take then became the first jockey in history to win the Tokyo Yushun three times.

After the Tokyo Yushun, he was trained at Ritto before being transferred to Yoshizawa Stable in Urakawa, Hokkaido for further training. He returned to Ritto on August 25 for the autumn season and continued to train smoothly thereafter. However, after training on September 1, he developed an injury in his leg and was examined. This revealed that he had developed a bowed tendon. He was diagnosed with a six-month recovery period, making him unable to race in the autumn season. After discussions between his owner Tanimizu, trainer Matsuda, and other related parties, it was decided that he would retire from racing, given the difficult road to recovery and the high expectations of his breeding farm.

Gimlet's retirement ceremony was held at Sapporo racecourse on August 24, 2003.

== Stud career ==
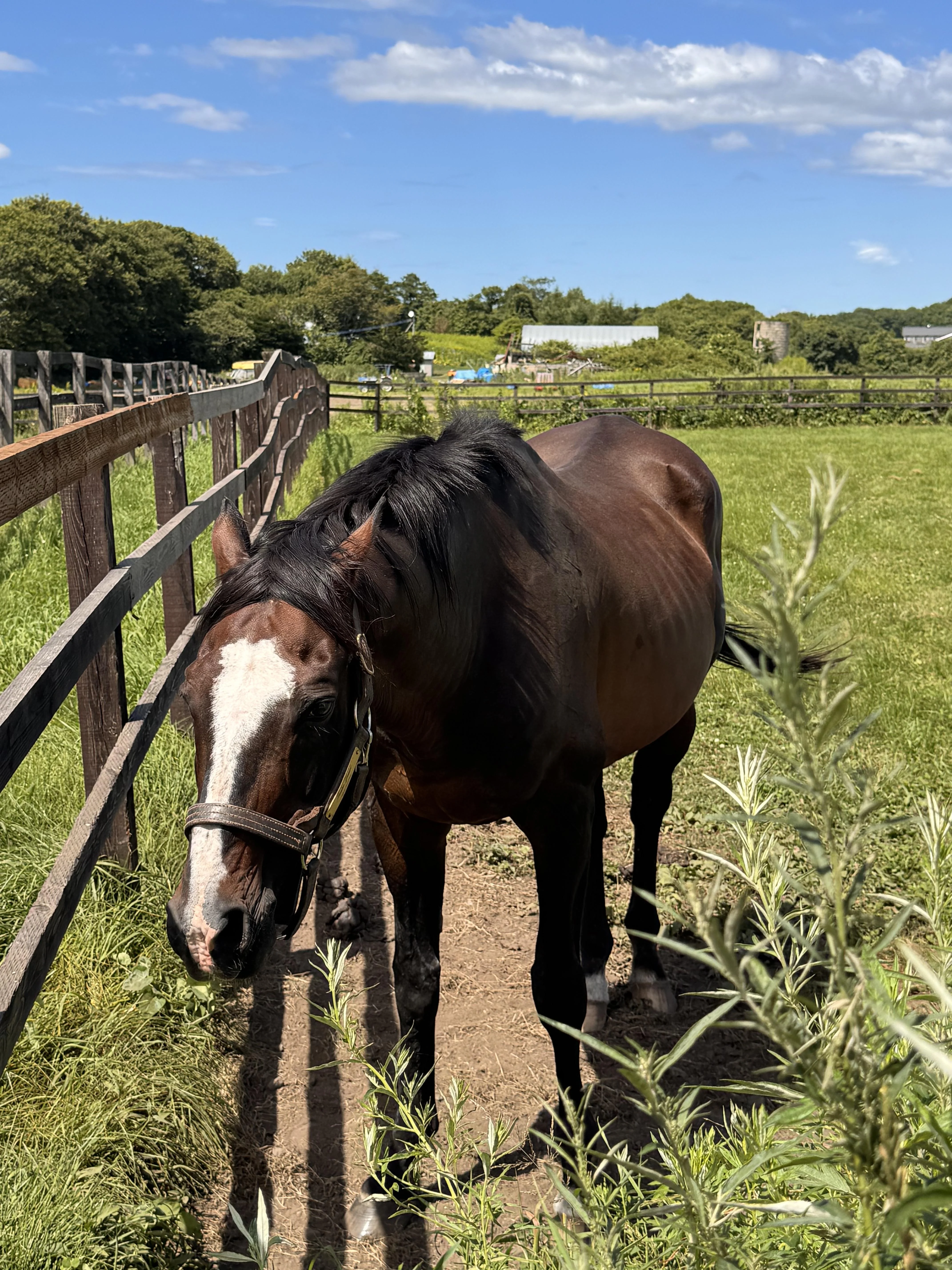
Tanino Gimlet in retirement at Versailles Farm

Tanino Gimlet was placed at Shadai Stallion Station from 2003 to 2013. He was then moved to Lex Stud in 2014 until 2020.

During his breeding life, Gimlet has sired many foals. The most notable offspring is Vodka, who became the first filly in 64 years to win the Tokyo Yushun. Other notable offspring include Hagino Hybrid, who won the Kyoto Shimbun Hai, and Midsummer Fair, who won the Flora Stakes.

Tanino Gimlet retired from stud duty in 2020, and is pensioned at the Versailles Farm. During retirement Tanino Gimlet gained a reputation for destroying his field's fences, despite efforts by the farm to prevent this. By 2022, he had kicked down over 30 of them, resulting in the nickname 'Destruction God' by fans. Versailles Farm has since sold merchandise created with the broken fence pieces to recuperate the costs of replacing them.

=== Notable progeny ===
c = colt, f = filly, g = gelding

bold = grade 1 stakes

Foaled	Name	Sex	Major Wins
2004	Absolute	g	Tokyo Shimbun Hai, Fuji Stakes
2004	Gold Aguli	c	Niigata Nisai Stakes
2004	Hiraboku Royal	c	Aoba Sho
2004	Nishino Blue Moon	f	Nakayama Himba Stakes
2004	Vodka	f	**Hanshin Juvenile Fillies**, Tulip Sho, **Tōkyō Yūshun**, **Yasuda Kinen** (twice), **Tennō Shō (Autumn)**, **Victoria Mile**, **Japan Cup**
2005	Smile Jack	c	Spring Stakes, Sekiya Kinen, Tokyo Shimbun Hai
2006	Sacred Valley	c	Niigata Daishoten
2008	All That Jazz	f	Fukushima Himba Stakes (twice)
2008	Cresco Grand	c	Kyoto Shimbun Hai
2009	Midsummer Fair	f	Flora Stakes
2011	Hagino Hybrid	c	Kyoto Shimbun Hai
2011	Meadowlark	c	Tanabata Sho, Hanshin Jump Stakes
2013	Black Spinel	g	Tokyo Shimbun Hai

== In popular culture ==
An anthropomorphized version of Tanino Gimlet appears as a character in the Japanese multimedia franchise Umamusume: Pretty Derby, voiced by Misato Matsuoka. She is depicted wearing an eyepatch over her right eye, coincidentally before the real-life Tanino Gimlet suffered an infection on his left eye. She is characterized by her loud, overly-dramatic manner of speaking that includes prose and mythological references, her interests in bartending and artistry, and an inexplicable and pathological need to destroy fences that the franchise has parodied and extended to similar obstacles such as walls. Her junior Vodka admires her and looks up to her as a role model, and regularly attempts to emulate her mannerisms. Rose Kingdom also admires Tanino Gimlet to the point of keeping a notebook of her language and mannerisms in an attempt to understand her; in turn she teaches her about destroying fences, reflecting the real-world Rose imitating Gimlet's fence-destroying habits.

== Racing form ==
Tanino Gimlet hit the podium in every eight races he started (five wins, one second place and two third-place finish). This data is available based on JBIS and netkeiba.

Date	Racecourse	Race	Grade	Distance (Condition)	Entry	HN	Odds (Favored)	Finish	Time	Margins	Jockey	Winner (Runner-up)
2001 – two-year-old season
Aug 5	Sapporo	2yo Newcomer		1,000 m (Fast)	12	7	2.1 (1)	2nd	1:00.8	0.2	Norihiro Yokoyama	Rare Pearl
Dec 22	Hanshin	2yo Maiden		1,600 m (Firm)	16	4	3.6 (3)	1st	1:35.6	–1.2	Hirofumi Shii	(Hamano Hawk)
2002 – three-year-old season
Jan 14	Kyoto	Shinzan Kinen	3	1,600 m (Firm)	16	3	2.2 (1)	1st	1:34.8	–0.1	Yutaka Take	(Cheers Stark)
Feb 23	Hanshin	Arlington Cup	3	1,600 m (Firm)	13	9	1.3 (1)	1st	1:33.9	–0.6	Yutaka Take	(Homan Winner)
Mar 17	Nakayama	Spring Stakes	2	1,800 m (Firm)	16	11	1.3 (1)	1st	1:46.9	0.0	Hirofumi Shii	(Telegnosis)
Apr 14	Nakayama	Satsuki Sho	1	2,000 m (Firm)	18	11	2.6 (1)	3rd	1:58.8	0.3	Hirofumi Shii	No Reason
May 4	Tokyo	NHK Mile Cup	1	1,600 m (Firm)	18	9	1.5 (1)	3rd	1:33.5	0.4	Yutaka Take	Telegnosis
May 26	Tokyo	Tokyo Yushun	1	2,400 m (Firm)	18	3	2.6 (1)	1st	2:26.2	–0.2	Yutaka Take	(Symboli Kris S)

Legend:
Turf Dirt

== Pedigree ==
Pedigree of Tanino Gimlet
Sire Brian's Time (USA) 1985	Roberto (USA); 1969	Hail to Reason	Turn-to
Sire Brian's Time (USA) 1985	Roberto (USA); 1969	Hail to Reason	Nothirdchance
Sire Brian's Time (USA) 1985	Roberto (USA); 1969	Bramalea	Nashua
Sire Brian's Time (USA) 1985	Roberto (USA); 1969	Bramalea	Rarelea
Sire Brian's Time (USA) 1985	Kelley's Day (USA); 1977	Graustark	Ribot
Sire Brian's Time (USA) 1985	Kelley's Day (USA); 1977	Graustark	Flower Bowl
Sire Brian's Time (USA) 1985	Kelley's Day (USA); 1977	Golden Trail	Hasty Road
Sire Brian's Time (USA) 1985	Kelley's Day (USA); 1977	Golden Trail	Sunny Vale
Dam Tanino Crystal (JPN) 1988	Crystal Palace (FRA); 1974	Caro	Fortino
Dam Tanino Crystal (JPN) 1988	Crystal Palace (FRA); 1974	Caro	Chambord
Dam Tanino Crystal (JPN) 1988	Crystal Palace (FRA); 1974	Hermieres	Sicambre
Dam Tanino Crystal (JPN) 1988	Crystal Palace (FRA); 1974	Hermieres	Vieille Pierre
Dam Tanino Crystal (JPN) 1988	Tanino Sea-bird (USA); 1972	Sea-Bird	Dan Cupid
Dam Tanino Crystal (JPN) 1988	Tanino Sea-bird (USA); 1972	Sea-Bird	Sicalade
Dam Tanino Crystal (JPN) 1988	Tanino Sea-bird (USA); 1972	Flaxen	Graustark
Dam Tanino Crystal (JPN) 1988	Tanino Sea-bird (USA); 1972	Flaxen	Flavia

Tanino Gimlet's family number is F9-c, and has an inbreeding of Graustark (S3xM4), Sicambre (M4xM5), and Roman (S5xM5).
