= Brian's Time =

American-bred Thoroughbred racehorse

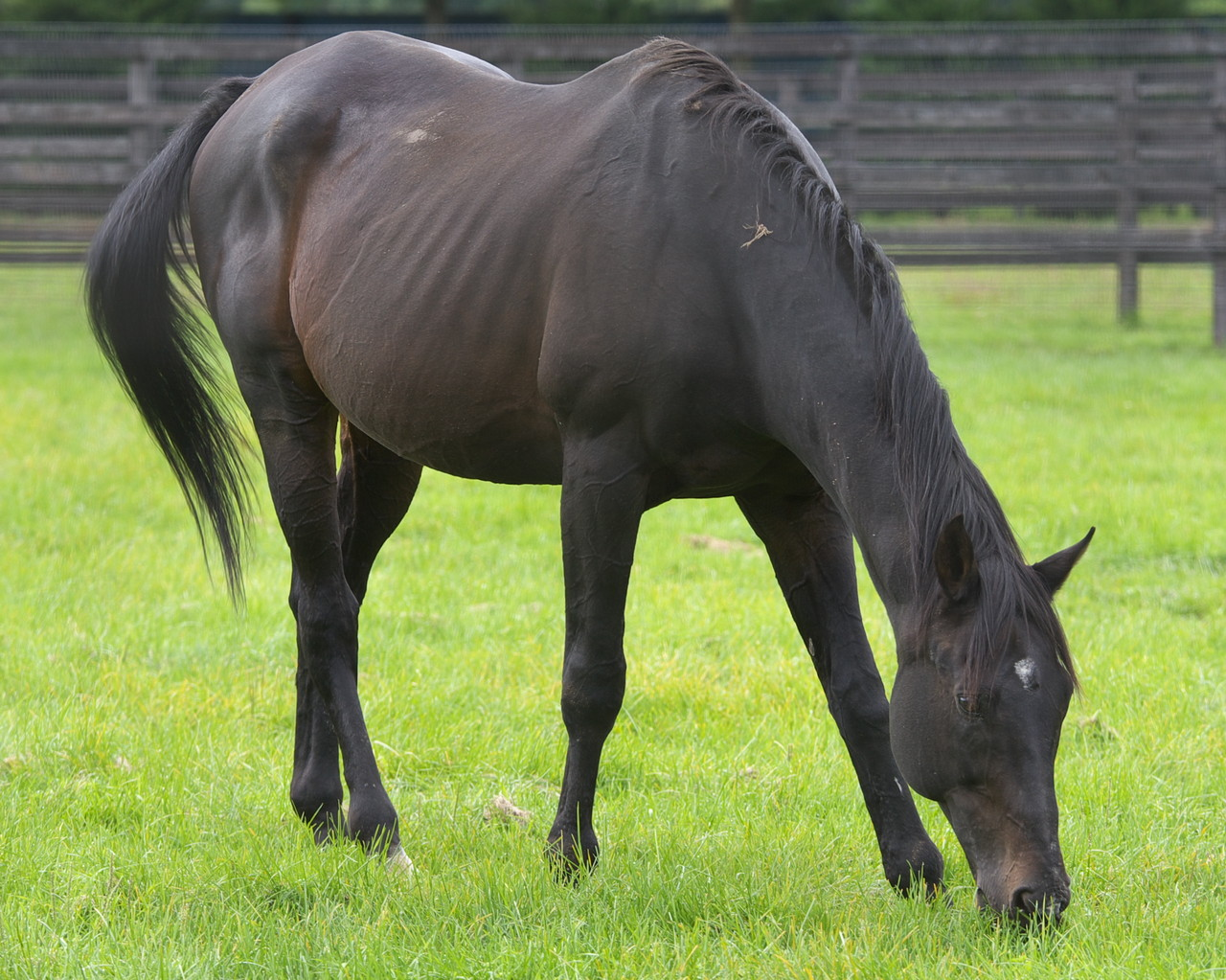
- Brian's Time in 2009
- Breed: Thoroughbred
- Sire: Roberto
- Grandsire: Hail to Reason
- Dam: Kelley's Day
- Damsire: Graustark
- Sex: Stallion
- Foaled: May 28, 1985
- Country: United States
- Colour: Dark Brown
- Breeder: Joan (Jody) Phillips
- Owner: Joan (Jody) Phillips
- Trainer: John M. Veitch
- Record: 21: 5-2-6
- Earnings: $1,001,269

Major wins
- Florida Derby (1988); Pegasus Handicap (1988); Jim Dandy Stakes (1988)

Brian's Time (May 28, 1985 - April 4, 2013) was an American Thoroughbred racehorse. He was sired by Roberto by breeder Joan Phillips. Brian's Time was a grade one stakes-winning millionaire who is probably most remembered for his win in the Florida Derby and a solid runner-up finish to Dual Classic winner Risen Star in the 1988 Preakness Stakes. He later became a very successful breeding stallion in Japan.

== Early career ==
Brian's Time was a late bloomer and raced only twice as a two-year-old, breaking his maiden in his second attempt. The Roberto colt placed second at Gulfstream Park in a very strong field of sophomores in an allowance race in the winter of his three-year-old season, so his trainer, John M. Veitch, gave him a shot in the grade two Fountain of Youth Stakes. In that race, he faced stakes winners and colts that had won three to five previous starts. He finished fourth, but came back to race in a grade one Florida Derby against ten other three-year-old colts. He won against stiff competition, including Forty Niner and Notebook. Three weeks after the Florida Derby, Brian's Time placed third in the Jim Beam Stakes at Turfway Park in Florence, Kentucky.

His trainer and his owner, Joan Phillips, were encouraged by his Florida Derby finish and decided to enter him in the 114th Kentucky Derby in 1988. In that race, Brian's Time broke poorly and was badly outrun going into the first turn, being bumped several times in close quarters. He was dead last in the field of 17 and was forced widest of seven around the first turn. Coming out of the far turn at Churchill Downs, Brian's Time closed from seventeenth to sixth. Filly Winning Colors won that day.

== Preakness Stakes ==
John Veitch could not dismiss his colt and his ability because of the way that he closed strongly at the end of the Derby. He also had three very good excuses as to why he got behind so early (the poor break, being bumped, and going very wide around the turn), so Veitch decided to wheel him back in two weeks into the second jewel of the Triple Crown. The three top finishers of the Derby took most of the public support in the grade one Preakness Stakes at Pimlico Race Course. Brian's Time was a lukewarm 7-1 at post time. Eight colts and the filly broke without any problems. The top two from the Derby, Forty Niner and Winning Colors, shot out to the lead.

Brian's Time sat back in seventh but was much closer than he had been in any other of his prior races. Throughout the backstretch and around the far turn, Forty Niner and Winning Colors remained in front. At the top of the stretch, a menacing Risen Star squeezed by on the rail and turned the Preakness into what looked like a romp. Risen Star finished three lengths in front of Winning Colors and 23 lengths in front of Forty Niner. Under Angel Cordero, Brian's Time closed from seventh to second, making up nine lengths in the last furlong as he passed every other horse except dual classic winner Risen Star, who won by a length. Derby winner Winning Colors held on for third, Private Terms was fourth and Forty Niner faded to seventh in the field of nine.

== Later career ==
Later that summer, Brian's Time placed third in the Belmont Stakes, won the grade two Jim Dandy Stakes at Saratoga Race Course and finished third in the grade one Travers Stakes, also at Saratoga. Late in the year, he won the grade three Pegasus Handicap run in October at Meadowlands Racetrack in East Rutherford, New Jersey.

At age four, Brian's Time raced five times and managed three third-place finishes in the grade two Nassau County Handicap at seven furlongs at Belmont Park, the grade two Bernard Baruch Handicap at 1 1/8 miles on the turf at Saratoga Race Course, and the grade one Ben Ali Handicap at Keeneland.

== Retirement ==
Brian's Time was retired after the 1989 racing season and was sold to a breeding syndicate in Japan. He was regularly one of the leading sires in that country. His offspring included a triple crown winner Narita Brian and also Mayano Top Gun, both of whom were voted Japanese Horse of the Year back to back in 1994 and 1995, as well as Time Paradox (Japan Cup Dirt), Sunny Brian (Japanese Derby), Tanino Gimlet (Japanese Derby), Silk Justice (Arima Kinen), Dantsu Flame (Takarazuka Kinen), Furioso (Japan Dirt Derby), No Reason (Satsuki Shō) and Phalaenopsis (Queen Elizabeth II Cup). On April 4, 2013, Brian's Time sustained a fractured femur in a paddock accident and was euthanized, he was 28.

=== Major winners ===
c = colt, f = filly, g = gelding

Major winners
Foaled	Name	Sex	Major Wins
1991	Brian's Roman	c	Sakurambo Kinen
1991	Chokai Carol	m	Yushun Himba
1991	Narita Brian	c	Triple Crown of Thoroughbred Racing: Satsuki Shō, Tōkyō Yūshun and Kikuka-shō; Arima Kinen, Spring Stakes, Kyodo Tsushin Hai Yonsai Stakes, Hanshin Daishōten
1992	Mayano Top Gun	c	Kikuka-shō, Arima Kinen, Takarazuka Kinen, Tennō Shō Spring, Hanshin Daishōten
1992	M.I.Blanc	c	Antares Stakes, Heian Stakes, Musashino Stakes
1994	Erimo Dandy	c	Nikkei Shinshun Hai, Keihan Hai
1994	Meiner Max	c	Asahi Hai Sansai Stakes
1994	Port Brian's	c	Fukushima Kinen
1994	Seiryu O	c	Sapporo Sansai Stakes
1994	Silk Justice	c	Arima Kinen
1994	Sunny Brian	c	Satsuki Shō, Tōkyō Yūshun
1995	Biwa Takehide	c	Radio Tampa Sho
1995	Brilliant Road	c	Niigata Daishoten
1995	Narita Luna Park	m	Nakayama Himba Stakes
1995	Phalaenopsis	m	Oka Sho, Shūka Sho, Queen Elizabeth II Commemorative Cup, Rose Stakes
1996	Toho Emperor	c	Tokyo Daishoten, Toki Daishoten, Nagoya Daishoten, Mile Championship Nambu Hai
1997	Erimo Brian	c	Stayers Stakes
1997	Meiner Brian	c	Sirius Stakes, Grand Chariot Cup, Gunma Cup
1997	Silk Prima Donna	m	Yushun Himba
1997	Toho Shiden	c	Nakayama Kimpai
1998	Big Gold	c	Nakayama Kimpai
1998	Dantsu Flame	c	Takurazuka Kinen, Arlington Cup, Niigata Daishoten
1998	Time Paradox	c	Japan Cup Dirt, Kawasaki Kinen, Japan Breeding Farms' Cup Classic, Teio Sho, Heian Stakes, Antares Stakes, Breeders Gold Cup, Hakusan Daishoten
1999	Bold Brian	g	Tokyo Shinbun Hai
1999	En Dehors	c	March Stakes, Tokai Stakes
1999	Erimo Maxim	g	Niigata Jump Stakes
1999	No Reason	c	Satsuki Sho
1999	Tanino Gimlet	c	Tokyo Yushun
2000	Meine Nouvelle	f	Flower Cup
2000	Run to the Freeze	c	Kyodo Tsushin Hai
2000	Silky Lagoon	m	Ocean Stakes
2001	Al Dragon	c	Nagoya Daishoten
2001	Meine Sorceress	m	Aichi Hai
2001	Sayonara	f	Empress Hai
2001	Tosen Bright	c	Thoroughbred Challenge Cup, Kurofune Sho, Hyogo Gold Trophy
2002	Big Planet	c	Arlington Cup, Kyoto Kimpai
2002	Moere Admiral	c	Hokkaido Nisai Yushun
2002	Nishono Nurse Call	f	Empress Hai
2002	Tagano Guernica	c	Heian Stakes
2002	Wild Wonder	c	Antares Stakes, Procyon Stakes, Negishi Stakes
2003	Nike Earthwork	c	Unicorn Stakes
2003	Tagano Bastille	c	Falcon Stakes
2004	Dragon Fire	c	Sirius Stakes
2004	Makoto Sparviero	c	Nippon TV Hai, Nagoya Grand Prix, Mercury Cup, March Stakes
2004	Meiner Hourglass	c	Sirius Stakes
2004	Furioso	c	Japan Dirt Derby, Zen-Nippon Nisai Yushun, Teio Sho, Kawasaki Kinen, Kashiwa Kinen, Diolite Kinen, Nippon TV Hai
2004	Victory	c	Satsuki Shō
2005	Meiner Charles	c	Yayoi Sho, Keisei Hai
2006	A Shin Beatlon	c	Summer Champion
2007	Birdie Birdie	c	Unicorn Stakes, Hyogo Championship
2007	Rainbow Dahlia	f	Queen Elizabeth II Commemorative Cup
2008	Laser Bullet	c	Tele Tama Hai Oval Sprint, Hyogo Gold Trophy
2010	Cafe Brilliant	f	Hanshin Himba Stakes
2013	Dantsu Prius	c	New Zealand Trophy

== Pedigree ==
Pedigree of Brian's Time
Sire Roberto b. 1969	Hail to Reason dk.b. 1958	Turn-to	Royal Charger
Sire Roberto b. 1969	Hail to Reason dk.b. 1958	Turn-to	Source Sucree
Sire Roberto b. 1969	Hail to Reason dk.b. 1958	Nothirdchance	Blue Swords
Sire Roberto b. 1969	Hail to Reason dk.b. 1958	Nothirdchance	Galla Colors
Sire Roberto b. 1969	Bramalea dk. b. 1959	Nashua	Nasrullah
Sire Roberto b. 1969	Bramalea dk. b. 1959	Nashua	Segula
Sire Roberto b. 1969	Bramalea dk. b. 1959	Rarelea	Bull Lea
Sire Roberto b. 1969	Bramalea dk. b. 1959	Rarelea	Bleebok
Dam Kelley's Day b. 1977	Graustark ch. 1963	Ribot	Tenerani
Dam Kelley's Day b. 1977	Graustark ch. 1963	Ribot	Romanella
Dam Kelley's Day b. 1977	Graustark ch. 1963	Flower Bowl	Alibhai
Dam Kelley's Day b. 1977	Graustark ch. 1963	Flower Bowl	Flower Bed
Dam Kelley's Day b. 1977	Golden Trail dk. b. 1958	Hasty Road	Roman
Dam Kelley's Day b. 1977	Golden Trail dk. b. 1958	Hasty Road	Traffic Court
Dam Kelley's Day b. 1977	Golden Trail dk. b. 1958	Sunny Vale	Eight Thirty
Dam Kelley's Day b. 1977	Golden Trail dk. b. 1958	Sunny Vale	Sun Mixa

== See also ==
- List of racehorses
