= Marvelous Sunday =

Japanese thoroughbred racehorse

Marvelous Sunday マーベラスサンデー
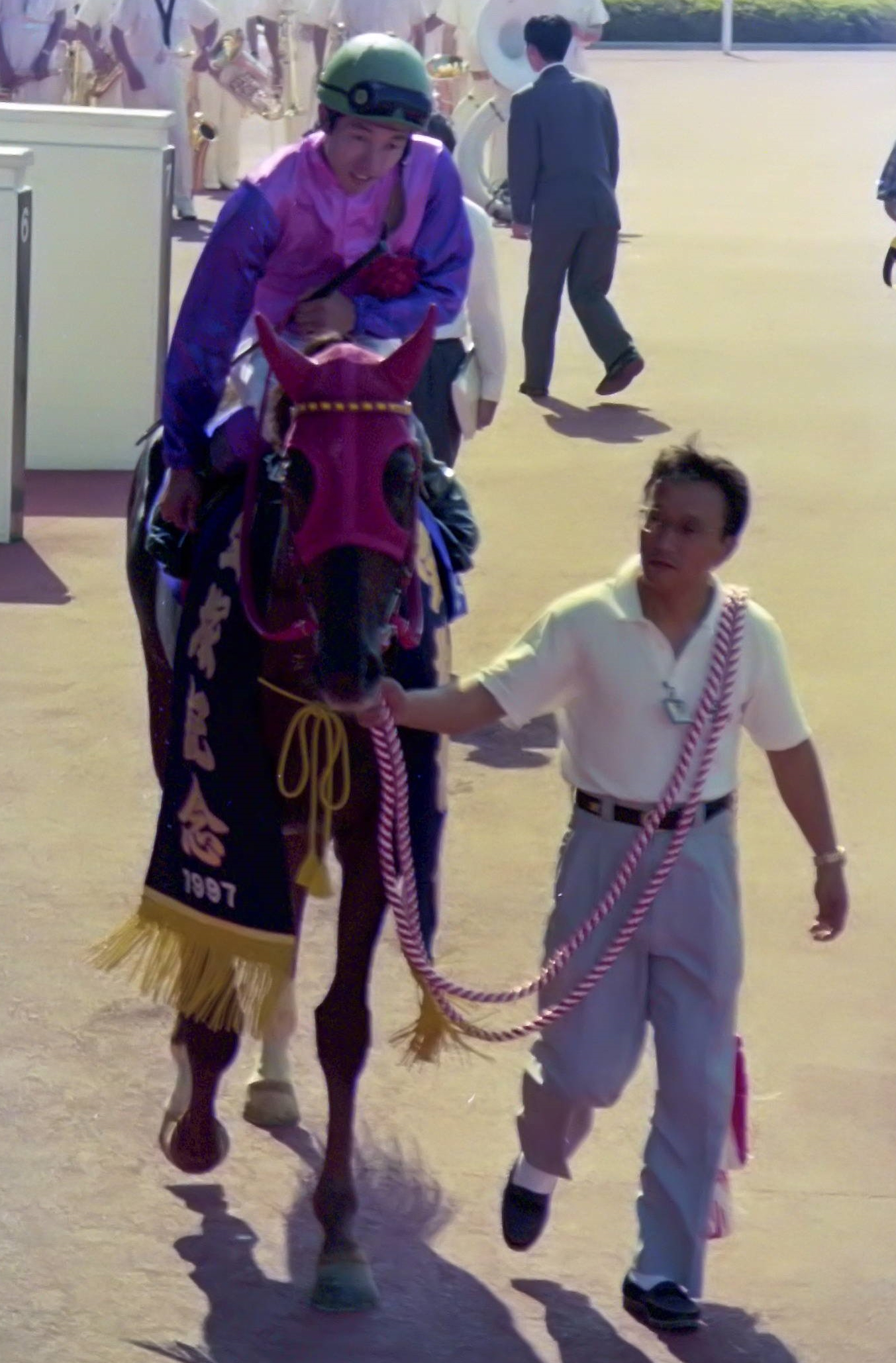
- Marvelous Sunday after winning the 1997 Takarazuka Kinen.
- Breed: Thoroughbred
- Sire: Sunday Silence
- Grandsire: Halo
- Dam: Momiji Dancer
- Damsire: Viceregal
- Sex: Stallion
- Foaled: May 31, 1992
- Died: June 30, 2016 (aged 24)
- Country: Japan
- Color: Dark chestnut
- Breeder: Hayata Farms
- Owner: Sadao Sasahara
- Racing colors
- Trainer: Makoto Osawa
- Jockey: Yutaka Take
- Record: 15: 10-2-1
- Earnings: ¥606,860,000

Major wins
- Epsom Cup (1996); Sapporo Kinen (1996); Asahi Challenge Cup (1996); Kyoto Daishoten (1996); Sankei Osaka Hai (1997); Takarazuka Kinen (1997)

Awards
- JRA Award for Best Older Male Horse (1997)

Marvelous Sunday (Japanese: マーベラスサンデー, Hepburn: Māberasu Sandē; 31 May 1992 – 30 June 2016) was a Japanese Thoroughbred racehorse and sire.

He is most known for winning the 1997 Takarazuka Kinen and Sankei Osaka Hai. He was awarded the JRA Award for Best Male Horse Aged 4-and-Up that same year. During his racing career, he suffered four different fractures, yet was affectionately referred to as the "Model Student" due to his consistent record and mild-mannered behaviour.

== Background ==
Marvelous Sunday's name is a combination of his owner's crown name, "Marvelous", as well as an homage to his sire, Sunday Silence. Additionally, Marvelous Sunday was born on a Sunday.

== Early Years ==
Marvelous Sunday was born in Hayada Farm, in Niikappu, Hokkaido. He was from the first crop of Sunday Silence, a stallion who would go on to lead the sire rankings 12 times. Despite his strong pedigree, he was considered quite a weak foal; eventually he was purchased by Sadao Sasahara, the owner of Marvelous Crown. In March of 1994, having reached racing age, Marvelous Sunday was transported to Rittō Training Center, training with the goal of a fall debut.

Sometime in August, the decision was made to have Yutaka Take be his jockey. That same month however, a fracture to his right knee was discovered during training, and he was sent out to pasture. While resting, he developed a severe case of Colic. His weight plummeted from a healthy 480-kilogram range, down to 390 kilograms. Stable-hand Furukawa remarked, "I was astonished to see a horse in such a state. Usually, the flesh on the face is the one thing that doesn't waste away, but even his face looked gaunt; his body was truly nothing but skin and bones."

Early treatment saved his life, but as a result of his critical condition, his planned debut was significantly delayed.

== Racing career ==
Marvelous Sunday's first race was the Four-Year-Old Newcomer at the Kyoto Racecourse on February 4, 1995, which he won. He would compete in his first Grade 3 race, the Epsom Cup, on June 30, 1996, resulting in a victory. He would then go on to win two more G3 Races that year, the Sapporo Kinen and the Asahi Challenge Cup. He would compete in his first Grade 2 race, the Kyoto Daishoten on October 6 that same year, resulting in another win. He would finally compete in his first Grade 1 race, the Autumn Tenno Sho on October 27, 1996, placing fourth. His only G1 Victory was the 1997 Takarazuka Kinen. His final race was the Arima Kinen on December 21, 1997, where he placed second behind Silk Justice.

== Racing Statistics ==
The following racing statistics were taken from JBIS.

Date	Race	Class	Distance	Racecourse	Track	Finish	Entry	Time	Jockey	Winner (2nd Place)
1995 – four-year-old season
Feb 04	Four Year Old Newcomer	Maiden	1800m	Kyoto	Dirt	1st	2	1:55.8	Y. Take	(Yagura Graviton)
Mar 05	Yukiyanagi Sho	Pre-OP	2000m	Kyoto	Turf	1st	13	2:02.6	Y. Take	(Daitaku Surgeon)
1996 – five-year-old season
Apr 13	Akashi Tokubetsu	Pre-OP	2000m	Hanshin	Turf	4th	6	2:01.5	Y. Take	Miller's Eight
May 5	Komogawa Tokubetsu	Pre-OP	1800m	Kyoto	Turf	1st	2	1:48.1	Y. Take	(First Sonia)
May 18	Okehazama Stakes	Pre-OP	1800m	Chukyo	Turf	1st	2	1:48.3	Y. Take	(Nishino Daio)
Jun 01	Epsom Cup	G3	1800m	Tokyo	Turf	1st	10	1:45.7	Y. Take	(Yu Sensho)
Jun 30	Sapporo Kinen	G3	2000m	Sapporo	Turf	1st	13	2:01.6	Y. Take	(Maillot Jaune)
Sep 08	Asahi Challenge Cup	G3	2000m	Hanshin	Turf	1st	1	1:59.5	Y. Take	(Star Man)
Oct 10	Kyoto Daishoten	G2	2400m	Kyoto	Turf	1st	5	2:25.1	Y. Take	(Minamoto Marinos)
Oct 27	Tenno Sho (Autumn)	G1	2000m	Tokyo	Turf	4th	11	1:58.9	Y. Take	Bubble Gum Fellow
Dec 22	Arima Kinen	G1	2500m	Nakayama	Turf	2nd	11	2:34.2	Y. Take	Sakura Laurel
1997 – six-year-old season
Mar 30	Sankei Osaka Hai	G2	2000m	Hanshin	Turf	1st	7	2:02.0	Y. Take	(Yutosei)
Apr 27	Tenno Sho (Spring)	G1	3200m	Kyoto	Turf	3rd	14	3:14.7	Y. Take	Mayano Top Gun
Jul 06	Takarazuka Kinen	G1	2200m	Hanshin	Turf	1st	8	2:11.9	Y. Take	(Bubble Gum Fellow)
Dec 21	Arima Kinen	G1	2500m	Nakayama	Turf	2nd	3	2:34.8	Y. Take	Silk Justice

== Stud career and death ==
After his final race in 1997, Marvelous Sunday became a stallion. He sired a total of 946 children, including King Joy and Marvelous Kaiser who won the Nakayama Daishogai in 2008 and 2012, respectively. He fully retired from the stud duty in 2014 and spent the rest of his years at Yushun Stallion Station before moving to Oda Yoneharu Farm in Shinhidaka Town in 2016. He died in the same year due to old age.

=== Notable progeny ===
c = colt, f = filly, g =gelding

Foaled	Name	Sex	Major Wins
1999	Loverly Frigg	f	Marine Cup
1999	Silk Famous	c	Nikkei Shinshun Hai, Kyōto Kinen, American Jockey Club Cup
2002	King Joy	c	Kyoto Jump Stakes, Kyoto High-jump, Nakayama Daishogai (twice)
2003	Never Bouchon	c	Nikkei Sho, American Jockey Club Cup (twice)
2004	Don Gracias	c	Kokura Summer Jump
2005	Rush Street	g	Saga Kinen
2005	Smart Gear	c	Chunichi Shimbun Hai
2006	Sunny Sunday	c	Fukushima Kinen
2008	Marvelous Kaiser	c	Nakayama Daishogai
2012	Tatsu Gogeki	c	Kokura Kinen, Niigata Kinen
2013	Ken Hovawart	c	Kyoto Jump Stakes

== In popular culture ==
An anthropomorphized version of Marvelous Sunday appears as a character in the Japanese multimedia franchise Umamusume: Pretty Derby, voiced by Marie Miyake. She is depicted as a short, upbeat girl with twintails who has an obsession with spreading positivity, or "marvelousness", to those around her, often through the use of inexplicable magical abilities. This behavior stemmed from her early childhood when she gained an appreciation for her life after surviving a life-threatening disease, similar to her real-life counterpart. She is one of the major characters featured in the Umamusume manga adaptation Umamusume: Pretty Derby – Star Blossom.

== Pedigree ==
Pedigree of Marvelous Sunday (JPN), 1992
Sire Sunday Silence (USA) 1986	Halo; 1969	Hail to Reason; 1958	Turn-to; 1951
Sire Sunday Silence (USA) 1986	Halo; 1969	Hail to Reason; 1958	Nothirdchance; 1948
Sire Sunday Silence (USA) 1986	Halo; 1969	Cosmah; 1953	Cosmic Bomb; 1944
Sire Sunday Silence (USA) 1986	Halo; 1969	Cosmah; 1953	Almahmoud; 1947
Sire Sunday Silence (USA) 1986	Wishing Well; 1975	Understanding; 1963	Promised Land; 1954
Sire Sunday Silence (USA) 1986	Wishing Well; 1975	Understanding; 1963	Pretty Ways; 1953
Sire Sunday Silence (USA) 1986	Wishing Well; 1975	Mountain Flower; 1964	Montparnasse; 1956
Sire Sunday Silence (USA) 1986	Wishing Well; 1975	Mountain Flower; 1964	Edelweiss; 1959
Dam Momiji Dancer 1980	Viceregal; 1966	Northern Dancer (CAN); 1961	Nearctic; 1954
Dam Momiji Dancer 1980	Viceregal; 1966	Northern Dancer (CAN); 1961	Natalma; 1957
Dam Momiji Dancer 1980	Viceregal; 1966	Victoria Regina; 1958	Menetrier; 1944
Dam Momiji Dancer 1980	Viceregal; 1966	Victoria Regina; 1958	Victoriana; 1952
Dam Momiji Dancer 1980	Momigi (CAN); 1972	Laugh Aloud; 1961	Tom Fool; 1949
Dam Momiji Dancer 1980	Momigi (CAN); 1972	Laugh Aloud; 1961	Gloria Nicky; 1952
Dam Momiji Dancer 1980	Momigi (CAN); 1972	Hold Me Close; 1963	Native Dancer; 1950
Dam Momiji Dancer 1980	Momigi (CAN); 1972	Hold Me Close; 1963	Sticky Case; 1958
