= Brett Doyle =

Brett Doyle (born 30 August 1972 in Newmarket, England) is a flat race jockey. Doyle has ridden 147 winners in Hong Kong across a number of stints. He rode 18 winners in the 2010/11 season, during which his best partnership was with Thumbs Up, winning the HKG3 Mission Hills Sha Tin Trophy in October 2010.

== Performance ==
Seasons	Total Rides	No. of Wins	No. of 2nds	No. of 3rds	No. of 4ths	Stakes won
2010/2011	292	18	19	24	20	HK$18,915,550
