= JRA Award =

Japanese thoroughbred horse racing awards

The JRA Award (JRA賞) is given annually since 1987 by the Japan Racing Association (JRA) to the outstanding horses and people in Japanese Thoroughbred horse racing. The awards originally started as the Keishū Sha Awards (啓衆社賞) in 1954 and were known as the Yūshun Awards (優駿賞) since 1972.

The most prestigious award for horses is JRA Award for Horse of the Year.

The equivalent in Australia is the Australian Thoroughbred racing awards, in Canada the Sovereign Awards, in the United States the Eclipse Awards, and in Europe, the Cartier Racing Awards.

Current awards:

- JRA Award for Horse of the Year
- JRA Award for Best Two-Year-Old Colt
- JRA Award for Best Two-Year-Old Filly
- JRA Award for Best Three-Year-Old Colt
- JRA Award for Best Three-Year-Old Filly
- JRA Award for Best Older Male Horse
- JRA Award for Best Older Filly or Mare
- JRA Award for Best Sprinter or Miler
- JRA Award for Best Dirt Horse
- JRA Award for Best Steeplechase Horse
- JRA Award for Best Trainer (races won)
- JRA Award for Best Trainer (winning average)
- JRA Award for Best Trainer (money earned)
- JRA Award for Best trainer (training technique)
- JRA Award for Best Jockey (races won)
- JRA Award for Best Jockey (winning average)
- JRA Award for Best Jockey (money earned)
- JRA Award for Best Steeplechase Jockey
- JRA Award for Best Jockey (newcomer)
- JRA Grand Prize Jockey
- Most Valuable Jockey
- JRA Special Award
- JRA Equine Cultural Award
- JRA Equine Cultural Award of Merit

The JRA Grand Prize Jockey and JRA Special Award are not regularly given out, as they will only be given if a horse/jockey is sufficiently deserving of the award.

Retired Awards:

- JRA Award for Best Horse By Home-bred Sire
- JRA Award for Best Anglo-Arab Horse
