= Yutaka Take =

Japanese jockey (born 1969)

Yutaka Take 武豊
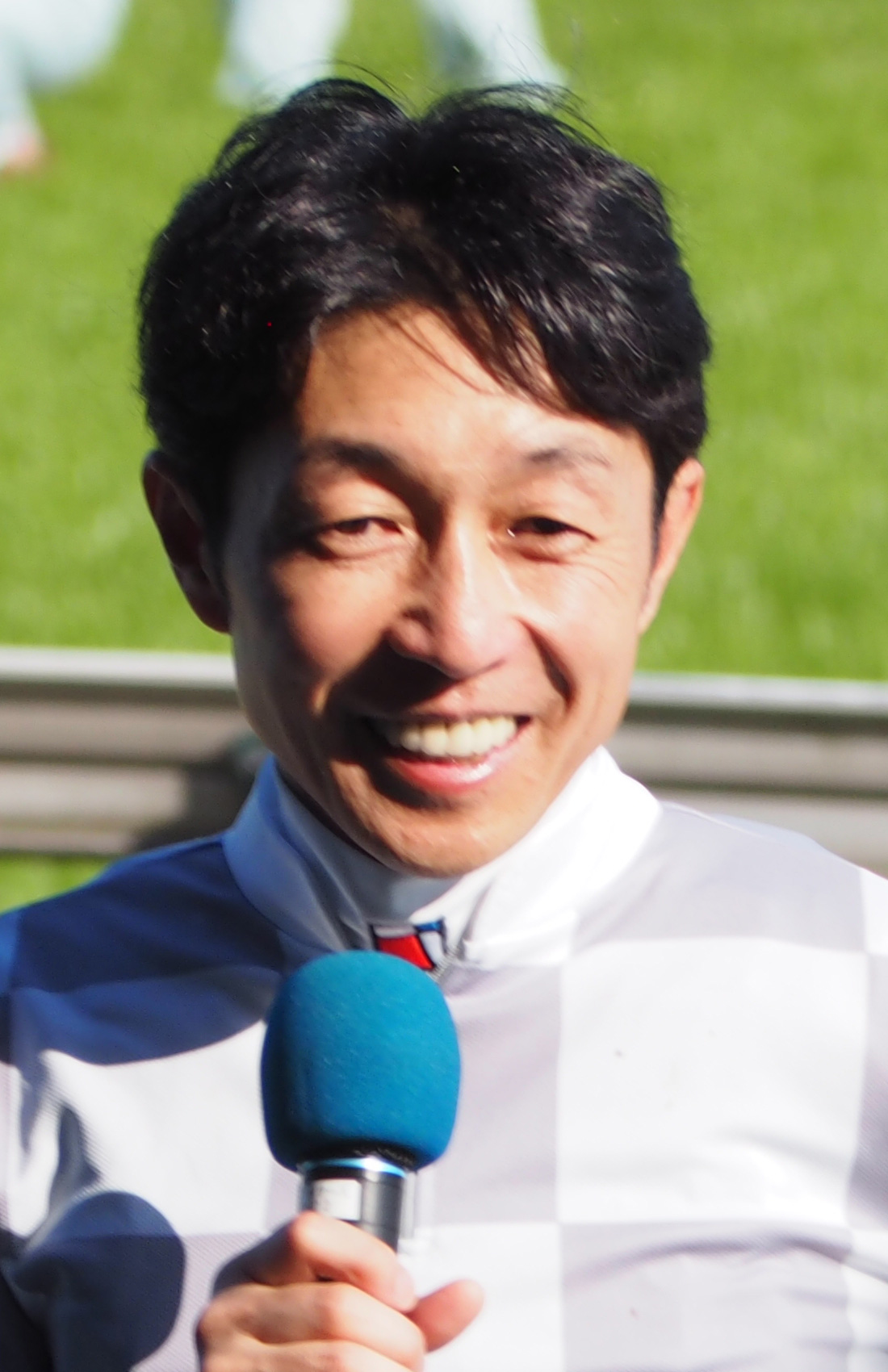
- Yutaka Take in 2022

Personal information
- Nationality: Japanese
- Born: March 15, 1969 (age 57) Yodo-juku, Kyoto, Japan
- Occupation: Jockey
- Height: 171 cm (5 ft 7 in)
- Weight: 50 kg (110 lb)
- Spouse: Ryoko Sano
- Website: http://www.yutaka-take.com/

Horse racing career
- Sport: Horse racing
- Career wins: 5,001 (Total); 4,669 (JRA); 202 (NAR); 130 (Overseas); As of July 19, 2026

Honors
- JRA Grand Prize Jockey (1997–2000, 2002–2006); JRA Award for Best Jockey (newcomer) (1987); JRA Award for Best Jockey (races won) (1989, 1990, 1992–2000, 2002–2008); JRA Award for Best Jockey (winning average) (1994, 1997–2006, 2008); JRA Award for Best Jockey (money earned) (1989, 1990, 1993, 1995–1999, 2000, 2002–2007, 2009); JRA Special Award (2007, 2013, 2018, 2024); Longines and IFHA International Award of Merit (2017)

Significant horses
- A Shin Hikari, Admire Groove, Admire Vega, Air Groove, Air Messiah, Air Shakur, Agnes World, Bamboo Memory, Copano Rickey, Dance in the Dark, Dance Partner, Deep Impact, Do Deuce, Fine Motion, Gold Allure, Going to Sky, Haru Urara, Inari One, Inti, Kane Hekili, Kitasan Black, Kizuna, Kurofune, Marvelous Sunday, Mayano Top Gun, Meisho Tabaru, Mejiro McQueen, Narita Taishin, Oguri Cap, Phalaenopsis, Seeking the Pearl, Shadai Kagura, Silence Suzuka, Sixpence, Ski Paradise, Smart Falcon, Special Week, Stay Gold, Super Creek, Tosen Ra, Wonder Acute, World Premiere, Vega, Vermilion

Yutaka Take (武 豊, Take Yutaka) (born March 15, 1969) is a Japanese jockey. Take made his riding debut in 1987 and currently holds seven all-time records in Japan. He has won at least one Grade 1 race for 23 straight years until 2010, and a graded stakes race for 40 consecutive years. Take has 114 wins to his credit in eight countries, including Australia, France, Germany, Hong Kong, Korea, United Arab Emirates, United Kingdom and the United States. His international victories include Group 1 wins in the Prix d'Ispahan (France) and Hong Kong Cup (Hong Kong), the July Cup (England) and Dubai Duty Free Stakes (UAE).

Take has won one of Japan's premier horse races, the Japan Cup, a record five times. He is both the youngest and oldest jockey to win a G1 in JRA history, at 19 years and 7 months old to win the 1988 Kikuka Sho, and 57 years and 8 months old to win the 2026 Queen Elizabeth II Cup.

== Early life ==
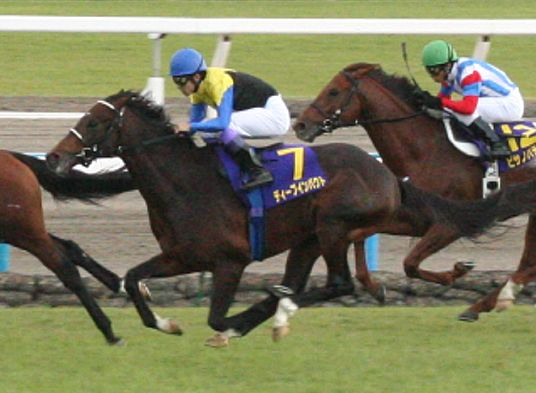
Yutaka Take on Deep Impact

Yutaka was born in Kyoto on March 15, 1969, to Kunihiko Take and Yoko Take. Kunihiko was also a notable jockey, nicknamed "The wizard of the turf" during his prime. Take followed in his father's footsteps, and made his debut as a jockey in 1987.

== Career ==
In 1987, he became the first rookie to ride 69 winners in one season. In the following year he became the youngest jockey to achieve 100 wins and won the Kikuka Sho riding Super Creek. Two years later, he was named the overall champion jockey by the Japan Racing Association (JRA), a title he held continuously until 1999 (apart from in 1991).

On April 3, 2003, Take appeared on a celebrity edition of Quiz $ Millionaire, and answered the final question (worth ¥10,000,000) incorrectly. Take would leave with ¥1,000,000.

In 2005, he won the Japanese Triple Crown of Thoroughbred Racing (Satsuki Sho, Tokyo Yushun, Kikuka Sho) with Deep Impact, the second undefeated horse that has won the classic. That year, Take achieved 212 victories, the most victories for any jockey in a single year.

On March 25, 2007, Take won the Takamatsunomiya Kinen at Chukyo Racecourse aboard Suzuka Phoenix. The win gave Take a Group One victory for the 20th consecutive racing season. Also in 2007, Take won his fourth Japan Cup Dirt in seven years. Take was the recipient of the 2017 Longines and IFHA International Award of Merit, which recognizes distinguished horsemen and horsewomen for lifelong contributions to Thoroughbred racing. He was the first jockey to win that award.

Take has also made appearances in equine-related television shows and commercials, including a collaboration ad between the JRA and Neon Genesis Evangelion; as well as several commercials for Umamusume: Pretty Derby, of which Take has also made a cameo appearance in the anime adaptation.

== Personal life ==
The Take family is known for horseracing. As well as his father Kunihiko, Take's brother, Koshiro, was also a jockey before transitioning to trainer.

In 1995, Yutaka married Ryoko Sano, a former tarento.

== Major wins ==
(United Kingdom) Great Britain

- July Cup - (1) - Agnes World (2000)

France

- Prix d'Ispahan - (1) - A Shin Hikari (2016)
- Prix de l'Abbaye de Longchamp - (2) - Agnes World (1999), Imperial Beauty (2001)
- Prix du Moulin de Longchamp - (1) - Ski Paradise (1994)
- Prix Maurice de Gheest - (1) - Seeking the Pearl (1998)

Hong Kong

- Hong Kong Cup - (1) - A Shin Hikari (2015)
- Hong Kong Vase - (1) - Stay Gold (2001)

Japan

- Arima Kinen - (4) - Oguri Cap (1990), Deep Impact (2006), Kitasan Black (2017), Do Deuce (2023)
- Asahi Hai Futurity Stakes - (1) - Do Deuce (2021)
- Derby Grand Prix - (2) - Gold Allure (2002), Kane Hekili (2005)
- February Stakes - (5) - Gold Allure (2003), Kane Hekili (2006), Vermilion (2007), Copano Rickey (2015), Inti (2019)
- Hanshin Sansai Himba Stakes - (1) - Yamanin Paradise (1994)
- Japan Breeding farm's Cup Classic - (8) - Time Paradox (2005), Vermilion (2007 & 2008 & 2009), Smart Falcon (2010 & 2011), Copano Rickey (2015), Awardee (2016)
- Japan Breeding farm's Cup Sprint - (1) - Meiner Select (2004)
- Japan Breeding farm's Cup Ladies' Classic - (1) - Yamanin Imprime (2019)
- Japan Cup - (5) - Special Week (1999), Deep Impact (2006), Rose Kingdom (2010), Kitasan Black (2016), Do Deuce (2024)
- Japan Cup Dirt - (4) - Kurofune (2001), Time Paradox (2004), Kane Hekili (2005), Vermillion (2007)
- Japan Dirt Derby - (4) - Gold Allure (2002), Big Wolf (2003), Kane Hekili (2005), Notturno (2022)
- Kawasaki Kinen - (3) - Time Paradox (2005), Vermilion (2010), Smart Falcon (2012)
- Kashiwa Kinen - (2) - Copano Rickey (2016 & 2017)
- Kikuka Shō - (6) - Super Creek (1988),Dance in the Dark (1996), Air Shakur (2000), Deep Impact (2005), World Premiere (2019), Going to Sky (2026)
- Mile Championship - (2) - Sadamu Patek (2012), Tosen Ra (2013)
- Mile Championship Nambu Hai - (1) - Nihon Pillow Jupiter (1999)
- NHK Mile Cup - (3) - Seeking the Pearl (1997), Kurofune (2001), Logic (2006)
- Oka Sho - (5) - Shadai Kagura (1989), Vega (1993), Oguri Roman (1994), Phalaenopsis (1998), Dance in the Mood (2004)
- Osaka Hai - (2) - Kitasan Black (2017), Jack d'Or (2023)
- Queen Elizabeth II Commemorative Cup - (5) - To the Victory (2001), Fine Motion (2002), Admire Groove (2003 & 2004), Laughterlines (2026)
- Satsuki Shō - (3) - Narita Taishin (1993), Air Shakur (2000), Deep Impact (2005)
- Shuka Sho - (3) - Phalaenopsis (1998), Fine Motion (2002), Air Messiah (2005)
- Sprinters Stakes - (2) - Bamboo Memory (1990), Believe (2002)
- Takamatsunomiya Kinen - (2) - Admire Max (2005), Suzuka Phoenix (2007)
- Takarazuka Kinen - (6) - Inari One (1989), Mejiro McQueen (1993), Marvelous Sunday (1997), Deep Impact (2006), Meisho Tabaru (2025 & 2026)
- Teio Sho - (5) - Time Paradox (2005), Vermilion (2009), Smart Falcon (2011), Wonder Acute (2014), Copano Rickey (2016)
- Tennō Shō (Autumn) - (7) - Super Creek (1989), Air Groove (1997), Special Week (1999), Meisho Samson (2007), Vodka (2008), Kitasan Black (2017), Do Deuce (2024)
- Tennō Shō (Spring) - (8) - Inari One (1989), Super Creek (1990), Mejiro McQueen (1991 & 1992), Special Week (1999), Deep Impact (2006), Kitasan Black (2016 & 2017)
- Tokyo Daishōten - (5) - Gold Allure (2002), Star King Man (2003), Vermilion (2007), Smart Falcon (2010 & 2011)
- Tokyo Yūshun - (6) - Special Week (1998), Admire Vega (1999), Tanino Gimlet (2002), Deep Impact (2005), Kizuna (2013), Do Deuce (2022)
- Victoria Mile - (1) - Vodka (2009)
- Yasuda Kinen - (4) - Oguri Cap (1990), Heart Lake (1995), Vodka (2009), Sixpence (2026)
- Yushun Himba - (3) - Vega (1993), Dance Partner (1995), Air Groove (1996)
- Zen-Nippon Nisai Yushun - (1) - Admire Hope (2003)

United Arab Emirates

- Dubai Sheema Classic - (1) - Stay Gold (2001)
- Dubai Duty Free Stakes - (1) - Admire Moon (2007)

=== Year-end charts in the United States ===
Chart (2007–present)	Peak position
National Earnings List for Jockeys 2007	93
