= Hasty Road =

20th-century American Thoroughbred racehorse

- Sire: Roman
- Grandsire: Sir Gallahad III
- Dam: Traffic Court
- Damsire: Discovery
- Sex: Stallion
- Foaled: 1951
- Country: United States
- Colour: Bay
- Breeder: Clifford Mooers
- Owner: Hasty House Farm
- Trainer: Harry Trotsek
- Record: 28: 14 – 5 – 3
- Earnings: $541,402

Major wins
- Arlington Futurity (1953); Washington Park Futurity (1953); Breeders' Futurity (1953); Kentucky Jockey Club Stakes (1953); Widener Handicap (1955); American Triple Crown wins: Preakness Stakes (1954)

Honours
- TSD American Champion Two-Year-Old Colt (1953)

Hasty Road (1951–1978) was an American thoroughbred racehorse which won the 1954 Preakness Stakes. In 1953, Hasty Road won six of his nine races including the Arlington Futurity and the Washington Park Futurity, and set a record for prize money won by a two-year-old. In 1954 Hasty Road defeated Determine in track record time in the Derby Trial and then finished second to the same horse in the Kentucky Derby. At Pimlico Race Course in May, he recorded his most important victory when winning the Preakness Stakes by a neck from Correlation. The rest of his three-year-old campaign wasn't as good, but he returned to form to win the Widener Handicap in February 1955 before his racing career was ended by injury.

== Background ==
Hasty Road was a huge bay horse with a distinctive white blaze, bred by Clifford Mooers of Walnut Springs Farm in Kentucky. He was sired by Roman, out of Traffic Court, a mare who also produced 1955 Woodward Stakes winner Traffic Judge. As a descendant of the broodmare Traverse, Traffic Court was also related to the successful racehorse and sire Bold Bidder. Traffic Court died in 1952 but was posthumously named broodmare of the year by the Kentucky Thoroughbred Breeders' Association in 1955.

Before his racing career began, Hasty Road was bought at the Keeneland summer sales for $23,100 by Allie Reuben, a real estate dealer from Toledo, Ohio and his wife "Billy" Allie Reuben had decided to pay more than $23,000 for the colt but was persuaded to make one final bid by his wife. The Reubens raced the colt under their Hasty House Farm colors. Hasty Road was trained by Harry Trotsek.

== Racing career ==
=== 1953: two-year-old season ===
Hasty Road won two five-and-a-half furlong sprint races at Arlington Park before his first major test in July 1953, when he ran in the Arlington Futurity. He started favorite against seventeen opponents for the race that carried prize money of $157,915, making it reportedly the most valuable two-year-old race ever run to that point. Ridden by Eddie Arcaro, Hasty Road took the lead on the home turn and claimed the victory by two and a half lengths from Mr. Prosecutor and Donnajack. His winning time of 1:10.2 for six furlongs was a race record. After losing his next race, Hasty Road ran in Chicago's other valuable two-year-old prize, the $156,085 Washington Park Futurity in September. Arcaro sent the colt into the lead after a furlong and he was never headed, winning by three and a half lengths from Athenian and thirteen others.

In October, Hasty Road finished unplaced behind Porterhouse when favorite for the Belmont Futurity, being apparently unsuited by the track. He maintained his position as the year's leading two-year-old money-winner, however, with a win in the Breeders' Futurity Stakes at Keeneland Race Course and was then sent to Churchill Downs for the Kentucky Jockey Club Stakes, in which he was matched against the highly rated Fisherman. Racing over one mile, Hasty Road beat Goyamo by one and a half lengths, with Fisherman more than five lengths further back in a dead heat for fourth. Hasty Road was ridden by Johnny Adams, who became his regular jockey.

By the end of the year, Hasty Road had earned $277,132, making him the second biggest money-winner of the season among all American horses and the most financially successful two-year-old in history. He was overwhelmingly voted American Champion Two-Year-Old Colt by Turf & Sports Digest magazine. The rival Daily Racing Form and Thoroughbred Racing Association awards, however, were taken by Porterhouse, and in the Experimental Free Handicap, a ranking of the year's best colts, Hasty Road was rated two pounds behind Porterhouse and Turn-To.

=== 1954: three-year-old season ===
Hasty Road began his three-year-old season in Florida, where he finished a neck second to Duc de Fer in the seven-furlong St. Valentine Purse at Hialeah on February 14. In the much more important Flamingo Stakes over nine furlongs two weeks later, he finished fifth of the nine runners behind Turn-To. During his time in Florida, Hasty Road displayed his "playful" temperament by twice throwing his exercise rider, sustaining minor injuries which delayed his training schedule.

Hasty Road returned to racing when he ran fifth in a seven-furlong allowance race at Keeneland on April 16. At Churchill Downs eleven days later, he was matched against leading Californian colt Determine in the one-mile Derby Trial Stakes. Running in blinkers for the first time, Hasty Road returned to his best form to beat Determine by a head in a track-record time of 1:35.0. The win emphasised his prospects in the Kentucky Derby, as the last two winners of the Trial, (Hill Gail and Dark Star), had taken the first leg of the Triple Crown. Four days later, Hasty Road started the 5/1 fourth favorite for the Derby, with the Californian colts Correlation and Determine being first and second choices. Johnny Adams sent Hasty Road to the front from the start and held a clear advantage into the straight. Determine, however, emerged from the pack to challenge Hasty Road, took the lead one sixteenth of the mile from the finish, and won by one and a half lengths. Adams later claimed that Hasty Road was distracted by the crowd on the infield and lost concentration in the straight.

With Determine ruled out of the remaining Triple Crown races, the meeting of Hasty Road and Correlation in the Preakness Prep at Pimlico Race Course on May 18 seemed likely to decide the Preakness Stakes favorite. As at Churchill Downs, Adams attempted to lead all the way on Hasty Road, but Correlation caught him in the closing stages and won by a head. In the Preakness Stakes six days later, Hasty Road started 9/2 second favorite behind Correlation in front of a crowd of 29,604. Adams employed his usual tactics, leading from the start on Hasty Road until Willie Shoemaker moved Correlation to challenge him in the straight. The finish was closely contested and rough, with bumping between the two leaders as Hasty Road moved away from the rail and the third-placed Hasseyampa being obstructed when trying to make a forward move. At the wire, Hasty Road prevailed by a neck, but the result was only confirmed fifteen minutes later, after the racecourse stewards scrutinised replays of the finish. After the race, Adams, who had won his first Triple Crown race at the age of thirty-nine, said that he only used his whip once, at the top of the stretch, while Reuben paid tribute to the colt's courage, saying that he "hangs on like a bull dog".

Hasty Road never recovered his Preakness form and his results were mixed as the season progressed. Reuben had originally planned to miss the Belmont, feeling that the track and the distance would not suit the colt, but changed his mind after the Preakness. Hasty Road was sent to New York for the Belmont, but after the colt worked on the track, Reuben had another change of heart shortly before the race and returned him to his base in Chicago. On June 26 at Arlington Park, Hasty Road won the seven-furlong Warren Wright Memorial from off the pace by a length, with Hasseyampa third. At the same track in July, he started favorite for the Arlington Classic but never recovered from a poor start and finished fifth to Errard King. In the following month's American Derby, Hasty Road again lost to Errard King, tiring in the closing stages and losing second place to the Belmont Stakes winner, High Gun. In October, Hasty Road ran third to Helioscope in the Benjamin Franklin Handicap at Garden State Park and then finished last of the ten runners behind Chevation in the Yankee Handicap at Suffolk Downs. Hasty Road returned to the scene of his Preakness win in November but finished unplaced behind Helioscope in the Pimlico Special.

=== 1954: four-year-old season ===
As in 1953, Hasty Road began his year in Florida. In January at Hialeah, he recorded his first win for seven months when he carried 123 pounds to victory in a six furlong handicap race. He then took the Abraham Lincoln Purse at the same course at one mile and one-eighth, before carrying 122 pounds the $132,800 Widener Handicap on February 19. Rather than urging Hasty Road into a clear lead as he had often done in the past, Adams allowed the temperamental colt to set his own pace. Hasty Road led the race at a modest pace and turned into the stretch with a slight advantage over Capeador and Ram o' War. Although he drifted out slightly from the rail, Hasty Road appeared to have no difficulty maintaining his advantage, and Adams did not need to resort to his whip to hold off Capeador and win by a neck. An objection to the winner by Hedley Woodhouse, the rider of the runner-up, was dismissed by the racecourse stewards. Hasty Road's third straight win. On March 16, Hasty Road sustained an injury in training at Hialeah which was described as either a "wrenched left foreleg", or a "filled ankle". The horse was expected to return to the track in the summer; he finished third in his comeback and was retired to stud.

== Stud record ==
Hasty Road was not an outstanding success as a breeding stallion, but sired several good winners. His daughter Berkeley Springs was raced in Europe where she won the Cheveley Park Stakes and finished second in two of the five British Classic Races. Other winners included Copy Chief (Clark Handicap), Four Lane (Fall Highweight Handicap), Run For Nurse (Equipoise Mile) and Third Martini (Knickerbocker Handicap).

Hasty Road was a successful broodmare sire, with several daughters producing stakes winners.

- Broadway, 1961 Polly Drummond Stakes winner, dam of champion filly Queen of the Stage and sire Reviewer. Reviewer is best remembered as the sire of Ruffian.
- Impetuous Lady, dam of 10 stakes winners
- Lady Golconda, dam of 1974–1976 Horse of the Year Forego
- Golden Trail, grandam of Sunshine Forever, Brian's Time, Andover Way (the dam of Dynaformer, the sire of Barbaro), Darby Creek Road, and Memories of Silver (5th dam of 2001 Kentucky Derby winner Monarchos)

Hasty Road died in 1978 at the age of 27 and was buried at Meadowville Farm, The Plains, Virginia.

== Pedigree ==
Pedigree of Hasty Road (USA), bay stallion 1951
Sire Roman (USA)	Sir Gallahad (FR)	Teddy	Ajax
Sire Roman (USA)	Sir Gallahad (FR)	Teddy	Rondeau
Sire Roman (USA)	Sir Gallahad (FR)	Plucky Liege	Spearmint
Sire Roman (USA)	Sir Gallahad (FR)	Plucky Liege	Concertina
Sire Roman (USA)	Buckup (GB)	Buchan	Sunstar
Sire Roman (USA)	Buckup (GB)	Buchan	Hamoaze
Sire Roman (USA)	Buckup (GB)	Look Up	Ultimus
Sire Roman (USA)	Buckup (GB)	Look Up	Sweeping Glance
Dam Traffic Court (USA)	Discovery (USA)	Display	Fair Play
Dam Traffic Court (USA)	Discovery (USA)	Display	Cicuta
Dam Traffic Court (USA)	Discovery (USA)	Ariadne	Light Brigade
Dam Traffic Court (USA)	Discovery (USA)	Ariadne	Adrienne
Dam Traffic Court (USA)	Traffic (USA)	Broomstick	Ben Brush
Dam Traffic Court (USA)	Traffic (USA)	Broomstick	Elf
Dam Traffic Court (USA)	Traffic (USA)	Traverse	Tracery
Dam Traffic Court (USA)	Traffic (USA)	Traverse	Perverse (Family 3-n)
