= Just A Way =

Japanese-bred Thoroughbred racehorse

Just A Way; ジャスタウェイ
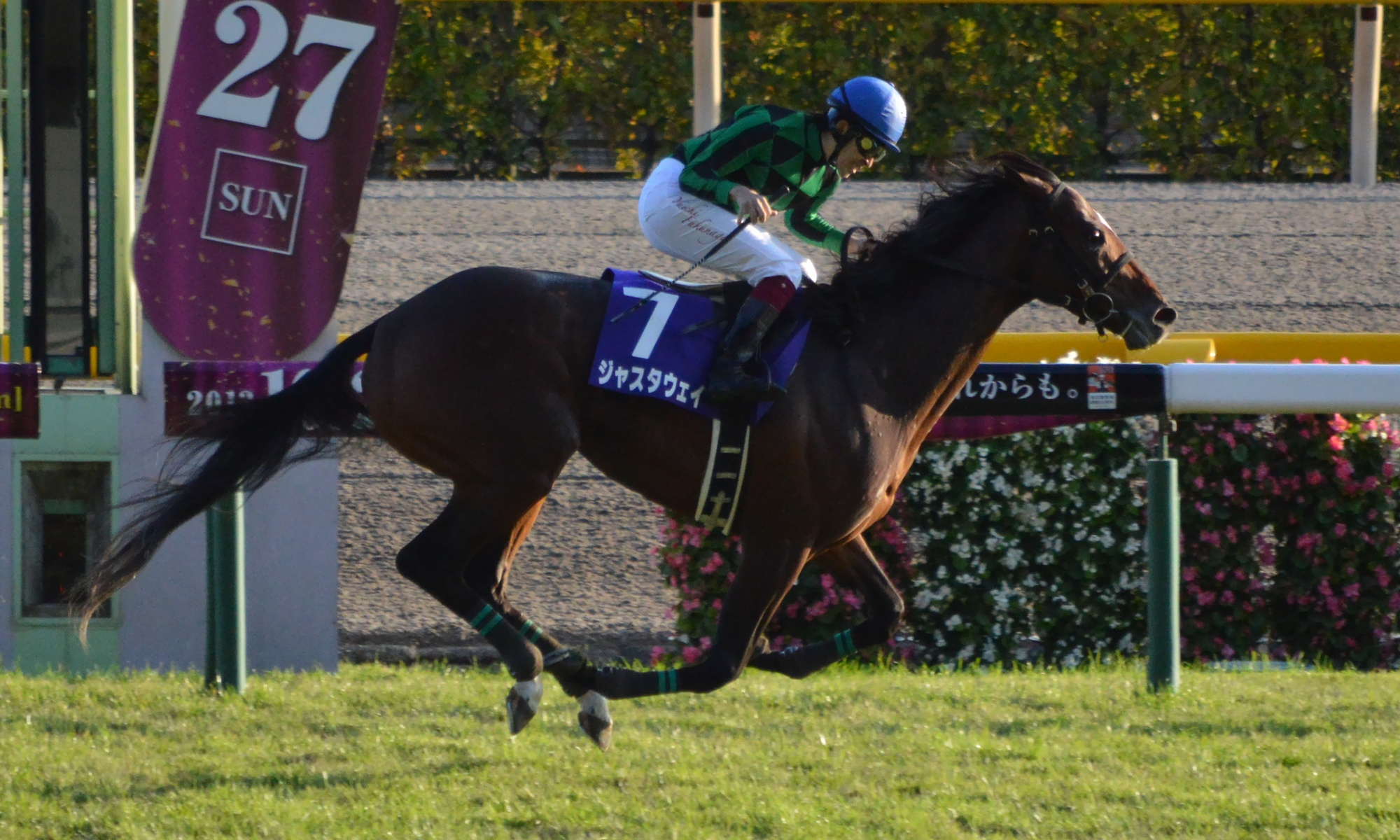
- 2013 Tenno Sho (Autumn)
- Sire: Heart's Cry
- Grandsire: Sunday Silence
- Dam: Sibyl
- Damsire: Wild Again
- Sex: Stallion
- Foaled: 8 March 2009
- Country: Japan
- Colour: Bay
- Breeder: Shadai Corporation Inc
- Owner: Akatsuki Yamatoya
- Racing colours
- Trainer: Naosuke Sugai
- Jockey: Yuichi Fukunaga
- Record: 22: 6-6-1
- Earnings: 909,409,000 JPY; JPN: ¥595,694,000 JPY; UAE: $3,000,000 USD

Major wins
- Arlington Cup (2012); Tenno Sho (Autumn) (2013); Nakayama Kinen (2014); Dubai Duty Free (2014); Yasuda Kinen (2014)

Awards
- JRA Award for Best Older Male Horse (2014)

Honours
- World's Best Racehorse (2014); Timeform rating: 131

Just A Way (Japanese ジャスタウェイ, Hepburn: Jasu Ta Uei; foaled 8 March 2009) is a retired Japanese Thoroughbred racehorse and an active stud. After showing useful, but unexceptional form in his early career he emerged as a major talent as a four-year old, with a win in the 2013 Autumn edition of the Tenno Sho. In March 2014 he ran outside Japan for the first time and won the Dubai Duty Free by more than six lengths. By April 2014 he was the top-rated horse in the world and retained his position throughout the year.

== Background ==
Just A Way is a bay horse with a white star and white socks on his hind legs bred in Hokkaido by the Shadai Corporation. He was from the second crop of foals sired by Heart's Cry a horse whose wins included the Arima Kinen and the Dubai Sheema Classic. His dam, Sibyl was a Japanese-bred daughter of the Breeders' Cup Classic winner Wild Again and the CCA Oaks winner Charon. As a descendant of the broodmare Venturesome, Charon was distantly related to several major winners including Silver Patriarch, Touch Gold, Discreet Cat, With Approval and Izvestia.

In July 2010, the yearling was consigned by the Shiraoi Farm to the JRHA Select Sale and was bought for 12 million yen by Akatsuki Yamatoya. The name came from that of a toy in episode 32 of the anime series Gintama, the script for which was written by Yamatoya and would later be used for a spear used by a monster in the 37th episode (also written by Yamatoya) of tokusatsu series Ressha Sentai ToQger.

== Racing career ==
=== 2011: two-year-old season ===
Just A Way made a successful debut on 23 July 2011 when he won a maiden race over 1600 metres at Niigata Racecourse. He was moved up to Grade 3 level at the same course in September and finished second when 7/10 favourite for the Niigata Nisai Stakes. On his final appearance of the season he finished fourth behind Deep Brillante in the Tokyo Sports Hai Nisai Stakes Grade 3 at Tokyo Racecourse in November.

=== 2012: three-year-old season ===
In February 2012, Just A Way finished fourth in the Grade 3 Kisaragi Sho and then recorded his first important success when winning the Grade 3 Arlington Cup over one mile at Hanshin Racecourse. He was then moved up to Grade 1 class in May and finished unplaced in both the NHK Mile Cup and the Japanese Derby. After a break of four months, Just A Way returned in autumn to finish second in the Grade 2 Mainichi Okan and sixth in the Tenno Sho.

=== 2013: four-year-old season ===
Just A Way was beaten in his first five races, competing in Grade 2 and Grade 3 races. He finished third in the Nikkan Sports Sho and second in the Epsom Cup, Sekiya Kinen and Mainichi Okan. On 27 October, Just A Way started at odds of 14.5/1 for the Grade 1 Tenno Sho over ten furlongs at Tokyo. The Japanese Horse of the Year Gentildonna started favourite for the race ahead of Tokei Halo and Eishin Flash who had won the race in the previous year. Ridden by Yuichi Fukunaga, Just A Way was not among the early leaders but began to make progress with a quarter of a mile left to run. He took the lead a furlong from the finish and drew clear in the closing stages to win by four lengths from Gentildonna in "impressive" style. After the race Fukunaga said: "In his previous race I felt he was getting stronger, so I expected his success today."

=== 2014: five-year-old season ===
Just A Way began his fourth season in the Nakayama Kinen on 3 March and won by three and a half lengths from Archimedes. He was then sent to Dubai where he started 3/1 favourite for the Dubai Duty Free over nine furlongs at Meydan Racecourse. His opponents included the British mares The Fugue and Dank as well as runners from South Africa, France, Dubai and Hong Kong. He was restrained towards the rear of the field by Fukunaga before moving forward in the straight. He took the lead a furlong and a half from the finish and accelerated clear to win by six and a quarter lengths from the South African horse Vercingetorix with Dank in third place. Fukunaga commented: "That was amazing. The start didn't go as I hoped it would and I had to change my plan but it all worked out for me".

On his return to Japan, Just A Way was moved back in distance for the Yasuda Kinen over 1600 metres at Tokyo on 8 June. Despite doubts about his ability to cope with the soft turf he was made 7/10 favourite against sixteen opponents, with Yoshitomi Shibata taking over from the suspended Fukunaga. He looked likely to be beaten in the straight as the 147/1 outsider Grand Prix Boss established a clear lead, but produced a strong finish to take the lead in the last stride and win by a nose.

In autumn, Just A Way was one of three Japanese horses, the others being Gold Ship and Harp Star, sent to Europe to contest the 93rd running of the Prix de l'Arc de Triomphe at Longchamp Racecourse. Racing over a distance of 2400 metres for the first time for more than two and a half years, he started the 8/1 fifth choice in the betting behind Taghrooda, Avenir Certain, Ectot and Harp Star. He raced in mid-division before making some progress in the straight but never looked likely to win and finished eighth of the twenty runners, five lengths behind the winner Treve. On his return to Japan, Just A Way continued to compete over longer distances and started third favourite behind Gentildonna and Harp Star for the Japan Cup on 30 October. He finished second of the eighteen runners, four lengths behind the winner Epiphaneia. On his final racecourse appearance, Just A Way was stepped up in distance again for the Arima Kinen over 2500 metres on 28 December and started third favourite behind Gold Ship and Epiphaneia. After being held up at the back of the field by Fukunaga he made progress on the outside in the straight but was unable to reach the leaders and finished fourth behind Gentildonna, To The World and Gold Ship.

== Racing form ==
Just A Way won six races and placed in another seven out of 22 starts. This data available is based on JBIS, netkeiba, Emirates Racing Authority (ERA) and racingpost.

Date	Track	Race	Grade	Distance (Condition)	Entry	HN	Odds (Favored)	Finish	Time	Margins	Jockey	Winner (Runner-up)
2011 – two-year-old season
Jul 23	Niigata	2yo debut		1,600m (Firm)	16	14	6.4 (4)	1st	1:36.1	–0.8	Yuichi Fukunaga	(La Page)
Sep 4	Niigata	Niigata Nisai Stakes	3	1,600m (Firm)	18	11	1.7 (1)	2nd	1:33.9	0.1	Yuichi Fukunaga	Monstre
Nov 19	Tokyo	Tokyo Sports Hai Nisai Stakes	3	1,800m (Heavy)	15	14	7.4 (3)	4th	1:53.5	0.8	Hiroki Goto	Deep Brillante
2012 – three-year-old season
Feb 5	Kyoto	Kisaragi Sho	3	1,800m (Firm)	13	8	6.9 (3)	4th	1:47.9	0.9	Shinichiro Akiyama	World Ace
Feb 25	Hanshin	Arlington Cup	3	1,600m (Firm)	13	13	4.1 (2)	1st	1:36.3	0.1	Yuichi Fukunaga	(Olivine)
May 6	Tokyo	NHK Mile Cup	1	1,600m (Firm)	18	14	10.0 (4)	6th	1:35.3	0.8	Yuichi Fukunaga	Curren Black Hill
May 27	Tokyo	Tokyo Yushun	1	2,400m (Firm)	18	4	112.9 (15)	11th	2:24.8	1.0	Shinichiro Akiyama	Deep Brillante
Oct 7	Tokyo	Mainichi Okan	2	1,800m (Firm)	16	7	61.6 (12)	2nd	1:45.0	0.0	Yoshitomi Shibata	Curren Black Hill
Oct 28	Tokyo	Tennō Shō (Autumn)	1	2,000m (Firm)	18	11	28.3 (8)	6th	1:57.8	0.5	Hiroyuki Uchida	Eishin Flash
2013 – four-year-old season
Jan 5	Nakayama	Nakayama Kimpai	3	2,000m (Firm)	16	9	3.4 (1)	3rd	1:59.9	0.4	Hiroyuki Uchida	Touch Me Not
Feb 10	Kyoto	Kyoto Kinen	2	2,200m (Firm)	11	4	3.5 (1)	5th	2:13.2	0.7	Hiroyuki Uchida	Tosen Ra
Mar 9	Chukyo	Chunichi Shimbun Hai	3	2,000m (Firm)	18	9	5.9 (2)	8th	2:00.3	0.7	Dario Vargiu	Satono Apollo
Jun 9	Tokyo	Epsom Cup	3	1,800m (Firm)	14	13	6.2 (3)	2nd	1:45.7	0.0	Yuichi Fukunaga	Clarente
Aug 11	Niigata	Sekiya Kinen	3	1,600m (Firm)	18	16	2.8 (1)	2nd	1:32.7	0.2	Yuichi Fukunaga	Red Spada
Oct 6	Tokyo	Mainichi Okan	2	1,800m (Firm)	11	10	9.3 (6)	2nd	1:46.8	0.1	Yoshitomi Shibata	Eishin Flash
Oct 27	Tokyo	Tennō Shō (Autumn)	1	2,000m (Firm)	17	7	15.5 (5)	1st	1:57.5	–0.7	Yuichi Fukunaga	(Gentildonna)
2014 – five-year-old season
Mar 2	Nakayama	Nakayama Kinen	2	1,800m (Good)	15	4	5.3 (2)	1st	1:49.8	–0.6	Norihiro Yokoyama	(Archimedes)
Mar 29	Meydan	Dubai Duty Free	1	1,800m (Good)	13	2	0.0 (1)	1st	R1:45.5	–	Yuichi Fukunaga	(Vercingetorix)
Jun 8	Tokyo	Yasuda Kinen	1	1,600m (Heavy)	17	10	1.7 (1)	1st	1:36.8	0.0	Yoshitomi Shibata	(Grand Prix Boss)
Oct 5	Longchamp	Prix de l'Arc de Triomphe	1	2,400m (Firm)	20	7	7/1 (3)	8th	–	–	Yuichi Fukunaga	Treve
Nov 30	Tokyo	Japan Cup	1	2,400m (Firm)	18	1	6.7 (3)	2nd	2:23.8	0.7	Yuichi Fukunaga	Epiphaneia
Dec 28	Nakayama	Arima Kinen	1	2,500m (Firm)	16	15	4.6 (3)	4th	2:35.5	0.2	Yuichi Fukunaga	Gentildonna

Legend:
Turf

- R indicated that it was a record finish time.

== Assessment and awards ==
In the April edition of the World's Best Racehorse Rankings Just A Way was placed first, five pounds ahead of Game On Dude. His rating of 130 was the highest achieved so early in the year since Curlin in 2008.

In the polling for the 2014 JRA Award Just A Way was elected Best Older Male Horse, taking 242 of the 285 votes beating Epiphaneia (31 votes) and Gold Ship (11 votes). He also finished runner-up to Gentildonna in the Japanese Horse of the Year poll and third to Snow Dragon in voting for the JRA Award for Best Sprinter or Miler.

When the 2014 World's Best Racehorse Rankings were published in January 2015, Just A Way was rated the best horse to race anywhere in the world in 2014, one pound ahead of Epiphaneia and two ahead of Able Friend, Australia, Kingman, The Grey Gatsby and Variety Club.

== Stud career ==
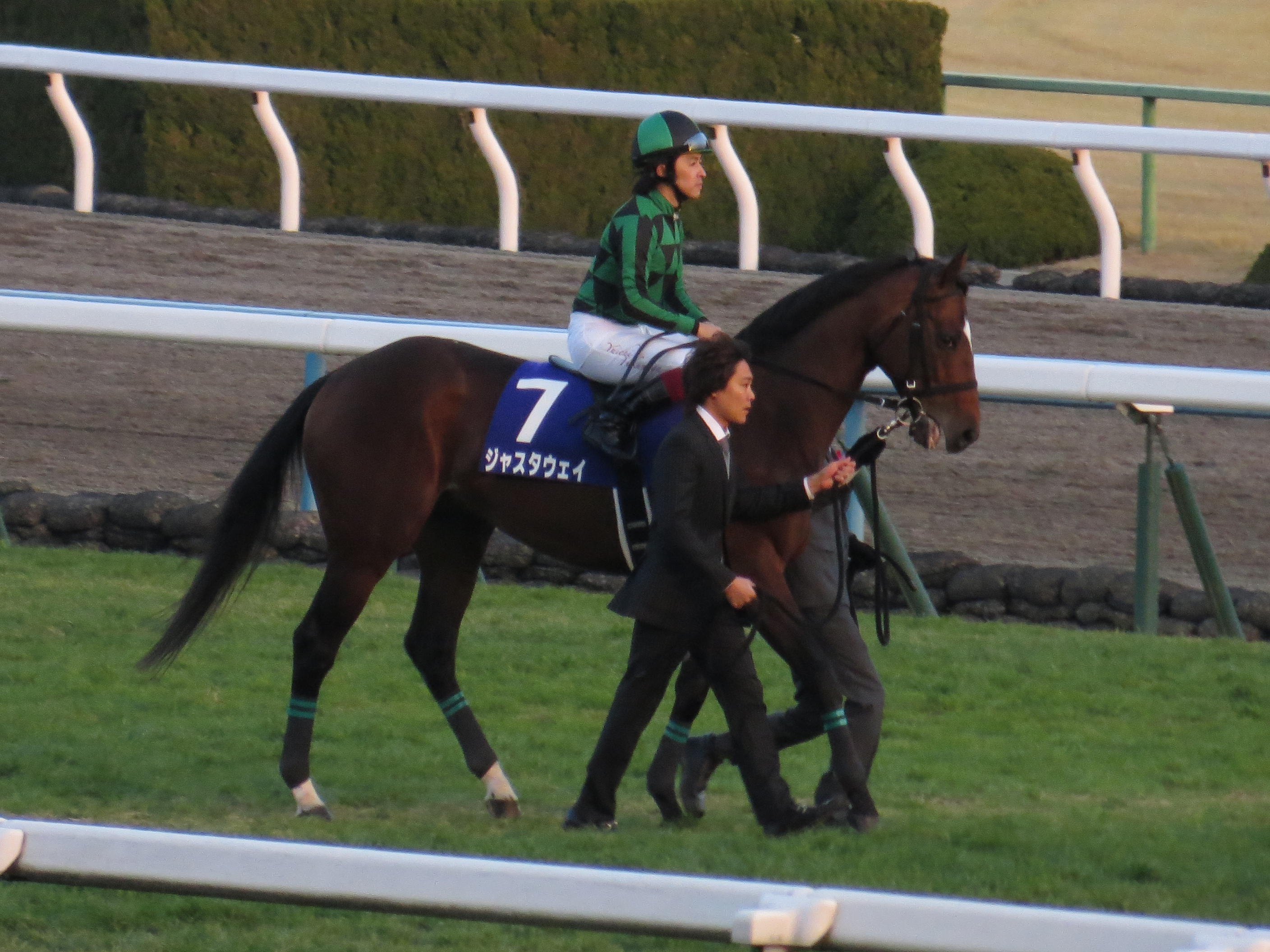
Just A Way on his retirement ceremony

After the Arima Kinen, Just A Way was retired on December 4, 2015 and assigned to stud duty at Shadai Stallion Station in Abira, Hokkaido. His stud fee began at 3.5 million yen. but in 2021 he moved away to Breeders Stallion Station.

=== Notable progeny ===
Below data is based on JBIS Stallion Reports.
c = colt, f = filly, g = gelding
bold = grade 1 stakes

**Foaled**	**Name**	**Sex**	**Major Wins**
2016	Admire Justa	c	Hakodate Kinen
2016	A Will A Way	f	Silk Road Stakes
2016	Lord My Way	c	Challenge Cup
2016	Master Fencer	c	Hakusan Daishoten, Mercury Cup (2x), Nagoya Grand Prix
2016	Teorema	f	**JBC Ladies Classic**, Marine Cup, TCK Jo-O Hai
2017	Epos	f	Fillies' Revue
2017	Vertex	c	Nagoya Grand Prix
2018	Danon The Kid	c	**Hopeful Stakes**, Tokyo Sports Hai Nisai Stakes
2018	Mystery Way	g	Copa Republica Argentina
2020	Corepetiteur	g	Kyoto Kimpai
2020	Gastrique	c	Tokyo Sports Hai Nisai Stakes
2020	Yamanin Ours	c	Procyon Stakes, Tokai Stakes

== Pedigree ==
Pedigree of Just A Way (JPN), bay horse, 2009
Sire Heart's Cry (JPN) 2001	Sunday Silence (USA); 1986	Halo	Hail to Reason
Sire Heart's Cry (JPN) 2001	Sunday Silence (USA); 1986	Halo	Cosmah
Sire Heart's Cry (JPN) 2001	Sunday Silence (USA); 1986	Wishing Well	Understanding
Sire Heart's Cry (JPN) 2001	Sunday Silence (USA); 1986	Wishing Well	Mountain Flower
Sire Heart's Cry (JPN) 2001	Irish Dance (JPN); 1990	Tony Bin	Kampala
Sire Heart's Cry (JPN) 2001	Irish Dance (JPN); 1990	Tony Bin	Severn Bridge
Sire Heart's Cry (JPN) 2001	Irish Dance (JPN); 1990	Buper Dance	Lyphard
Sire Heart's Cry (JPN) 2001	Irish Dance (JPN); 1990	Buper Dance	My Bupers
Dam Sibyl (JPN) 1999	Wild Again (USA); 1980	Icecapade	Nearctic
Dam Sibyl (JPN) 1999	Wild Again (USA); 1980	Icecapade	Shenanigans
Dam Sibyl (JPN) 1999	Wild Again (USA); 1980	Bushel-n-Peck	Khaled
Dam Sibyl (JPN) 1999	Wild Again (USA); 1980	Bushel-n-Peck	Dama
Dam Sibyl (JPN) 1999	Charon (USA); 1987	Mo Exception	Hard Work
Dam Sibyl (JPN) 1999	Charon (USA); 1987	Mo Exception	With Exception
Dam Sibyl (JPN) 1999	Charon (USA); 1987	Double Wiggle	Sir Wiggle
Dam Sibyl (JPN) 1999	Charon (USA); 1987	Double Wiggle	Blue Double (Family: 2-n)

== See also ==
- List of racehorses
