= Fine Motion =

Irish-bred Thoroughbred racehorse (foaled 1999)

Fine Motion; ファインモーション
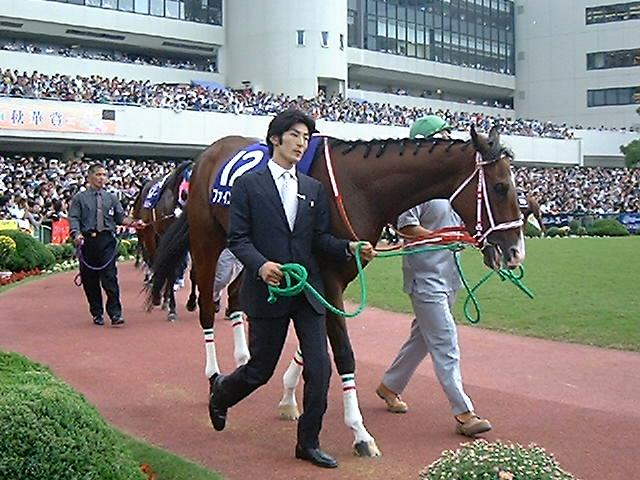
- Fine Motion at the paddock of the 2002 Shūka Shō.
- Breed: Thoroughbred
- Sire: Danehill (USA)
- Grandsire: Danzig (USA)
- Dam: Cocotte (GB)
- Damsire: Troy (GB)
- Sex: Mare
- Foaled: January 27, 1999 (age 27)
- Country: Ireland
- Colour: Bay
- Breeder: Barronstown Stud & Orpendale
- Owner: Tatsuo Fushikida
- Racing colours
- Trainer: Yuji Ito
- Jockey: Yutaka Take; Mikio Matsunaga
- Record: 15: 8-3-0
- Earnings: ¥494,518,000

Major wins
- Rose Stakes (2002); Queen Elizabeth II Cup (2002); Hanshin Himba Stakes (2003); Sapporo Kinen (2004) Japanese Classic Tiara Race wins: Shūka Shō (2002)

Awards
- JRA Award for Best Three-Year-Old Filly (2002)

Fine Motion (Japanese: ファインモーション, Fain Mōshon; foaled 27 January 1999) is an Irish-bred, Japanese-trained Thoroughbred racehorse. She won her first six starts, including the Rose Stakes (GII), the Shūka Shō (GI) and the Queen Elizabeth II Cup (GI) in 2002, and was named the Best Three-Year-Old Filly that year. She recorded eight wins from fifteen starts between 2001 and 2004.

== Background ==
Fine Motion is a bay mare foaled in Ireland at Barronstown Stud and Orpendale. She was sired by Danehill, and her dam was Cocotte, a mare by Troy. Her older half-brother Pilsudski (by Polish Precedent) won six Group 1 races, including the 1996 Breeders' Cup Turf and the 1997 Japan Cup. She was purchased by the Coolmore group and was expected to race in Europe.

Trainer Yuji Ito, who had previously imported the Barronstown-bred Arabansa, visited the stud in April 1999 and assessed the foal as superior to his previous horses. As Coolmore was concentrating on stallion prospects, the filly was sold to Japan. She was purchased for more than 100 million yen by Tatsuo Fushikida of Fushikida Farm in Urakawa, Hokkaido, as a future broodmare for the farm's ageing female family. She was raised at Takeda Stable, and was named Fine Motion by Osamu Fushikida.

== Racing career ==
=== 2001: two-year-old season ===
Fine Motion debuted on 1 December 2001 in a 2-year-old newcomer race over 2000 metres on turf at Hanshin Racecourse. Ridden by Yutaka Take, she led from the start and won by four lengths, recording the fastest final three furlongs of the race. She was entered for the Poule d'Essai des Pouliches and the Prix de Diane, but as a foreign-bred filly she was ineligible for the Japanese Classic Races, and the European plans were cancelled.

=== 2002: three-year-old season ===
She returned in August at Hakodate Racecourse with Mikio Matsunaga, winning by five lengths. On 25 August, she won the Akanko Special at Sapporo Racecourse by five lengths. On 15 September, she started 1st favourite at 1.2 odds in the Rose Stakes (GII) at Hanshin and won by three lengths against Sakura Victory.

On 13 October, she contested the Shūka Shō (GI) at Kyoto Racecourse with Yutaka Take. She started 1st favourite at 1.1 odds, a 72 percent support rate which was the highest for a graded stakes race since the introduction of the grade system. She won by 3.5 lengths in a time of 1:58.1, equalling the race record, and became the first undefeated winner of the final leg of the Fillies' Triple Crown. On 10 November, she ran in the Queen Elizabeth II Cup (GI) at Kyoto. She won by 2.5 lengths with the fastest final three furlongs of the race, 33.2 seconds, becoming the first undefeated winner of an open-age Grade 1 race in Japan, in a record six starts.

Her trainer stated that she would not run in the Arima Kinen regardless of the fan vote, but after she placed third in the fan voting she was entered. She started 1st favourite at 2.6 odds and finished fifth behind Symboli Kris S. She was named JRA Award for Best Three-Year-Old Filly at the end of the season.

=== 2003: four-year-old season ===
Fine Motion returned on 17 August in the Queen Stakes (GIII) at Sapporo, finishing second to Osumi Haruka. On 12 October, she finished seventh in the Mainichi Ōkan (GII) at Tokyo Racecourse. As entry to the Tennō Shō (Autumn) for foreign-bred horses was restricted to two horses determined by earnings, she missed the race. On 23 November, she ran in the Mile Championship (GI) at Kyoto, finishing second, 3/4 length behind Durandal. On 21 December, she won the Hanshin Himba Stakes (GII) at Hanshin, defeating Happy Path by a neck.

=== 2004: five-year-old season ===
She began the season on 6 June in the Yasuda Kinen (GI) at Tokyo, finishing 13th. On 25 July, she finished second in the Hakodate Kinen (GIII), a neck behind Craft Work. On 22 August, she won the Sapporo Kinen (GII) at Sapporo, defeating Balance of Game by half a length for her fifth graded stakes victory. On 21 November, she ran in the Mile Championship, finishing ninth. Her JRA registration was cancelled on 1 December 2004.

== Retirement ==
Fine Motion returned to Fushikida Farm as a broodmare. She failed to conceive to King Kamehameha in her first season, and never conceived afterwards. She was found to have a chromosomal abnormality making her infertile, and was retired from breeding. She remains at Fushikida Farm as a retired horse.

== In popular culture ==
An anthropomorphized version of Fine Motion appears as a character in the Japanese multimedia franchise Umamusume: Pretty Derby, voiced by Chinami Hashimoto. In October 2025, dialogue in the game referring to her as a descendant of Irish royalty was revised, instead giving her a backstory of being from a long-deposed European nobility that has since settled in Ireland. She is notable at Tracen Academy for having decorations on both ears (hinting at the reason for her real-life counterpart's failed broodmare career), her fascination with ramen and Japanese culture, and having an army of Umamusume bodyguards at her beck and call. Fine Motion is also best friends with the belligerent Air Shakur, whose data collection experiments she participates in as a voluntary test subject. Furthermore, to allude to her real life counterpart’s intersexuality, she wears ear decorations on both of her ears instead of one.

== Race record ==
The following table details all 15 starts of Fine Motion's racing career based on official JBIS and netkeiba records. Record current as of her final start on 21 November 2004.

| Date | Distance (Condition) | Race | Class | Course | Odds (Favourite) | Field | Finish | Time | Jockey | Winning (Losing) Margin | Winner (2nd Place) | Ref |
|---|---|---|---|---|---|---|---|---|---|---|---|---|
2001 – two-year-old season
| Dec 1 | Turf 2000 m (Good) | 2-Y-O Newcomer | Maiden | Hanshin | 1.1 (1st) | 10 | 1st | 2:03.4 | Yutaka Take | –0.7 | (Neo Maestro) | |
2002 – three-year-old season
| Aug 4 | Turf 2000 m (Good) | 3-Y-O+ Allowance | 1-win | Hakodate | 2.1 (1st) | 16 | 1st | 2:03.9 | Mikio Matsunaga | –0.9 | (Pretty Jewel) | |
| Aug 25 | Turf 2600 m (Good) | Akanko Special | 2-win | Sapporo | 1.3 (1st) | 14 | 1st | 2:42.4 | Mikio Matsunaga | –0.8 | (Mejiro Raiden) | |
| Sep 15 | Turf 2000 m (Good) | Rose Stakes | GII | Hanshin | 1.2 (1st) | 16 | 1st | 2:00.1 | Mikio Matsunaga | –0.5 | (Sakura Victory) | |
| Oct 13 | Turf 2000 m (Good) | Shūka Shō | GI | Kyoto | 1.1 (1st) | 18 | 1st | 1:58.1 | Yutaka Take | –0.6 | (Sakura Victory) | |
| Nov 10 | Turf 2200 m (Good) | Queen Elizabeth II Cup | GI | Kyoto | 1.2 (1st) | 13 | 1st | 2:13.2 | Yutaka Take | –0.4 | (Diamond Biko) | |
| Dec 22 | Turf 2500 m (Yielding) | Arima Kinen | GI | Nakayama | 2.6 (1st) | 14 | 5th | 2:33.4 | Yutaka Take | 0.8 | Symboli Kris S | |
2003 – four-year-old season
| Aug 17 | Turf 1800 m (Good) | Queen Stakes | GIII | Sapporo | 1.4 (1st) | 11 | 2nd | 1:47.7 | Yutaka Take | 0.0 | Osumi Haruka | |
| Oct 12 | Turf 1800 m (Yielding) | Mainichi Ōkan | GII | Tokyo | 1.3 (1st) | 11 | 7th | 1:46.4 | Yutaka Take | 0.7 | Balance of Game | |
| Nov 23 | Turf 1600 m (Good) | Mile Championship | GI | Kyoto | 4.8 (2nd) | 18 | 2nd | 1:33.4 | Yutaka Take | 0.1 | Durandal | |
| Dec 21 | Turf 1600 m (Good) | Hanshin Himba Stakes | GII | Hanshin | 1.4 (1st) | 16 | 1st | 1:33.4 | Yutaka Take | –0.0 | (Happy Path) | |
2004 – five-year-old season
| Jun 6 | Turf 1600 m (Yielding) | Yasuda Kinen | GI | Tokyo | 6.7 (3rd) | 18 | 13th | 1:34.0 | Yutaka Take | 1.4 | Tsurumaru Boy | |
| Jul 25 | Turf 2000 m (Good) | Hakodate Kinen | GIII | Hakodate | 2.1 (1st) | 13 | 2nd | 2:00.7 | Yutaka Take | 0.1 | Craft Work | |
| Aug 22 | Turf 2000 m (Good) | Sapporo Kinen | GII | Sapporo | 2.2 (1st) | 11 | 1st | 2:00.4 | Yutaka Take | –0.1 | (Balance of Game) | |
| Nov 21 | Turf 1600 m (Good) | Mile Championship | GI | Kyoto | 4.5 (2nd) | 16 | 9th | 1:34.1 | Yutaka Take | 1.1 | Durandal | |

== Pedigree ==
Pedigree of Fine Motion (IRE)
| Sire Danehill (USA) 1986 | Danzig (USA); 1977 | Northern Dancer | Nearctic |
| Sire Danehill (USA) 1986 | Danzig (USA); 1977 | Northern Dancer | Natalma |
| Sire Danehill (USA) 1986 | Danzig (USA); 1977 | Pas de Nom | Admiral's Voyage |
| Sire Danehill (USA) 1986 | Danzig (USA); 1977 | Pas de Nom | Petitioner |
| Sire Danehill (USA) 1986 | Razyana (USA); 1981 | His Majesty | Ribot |
| Sire Danehill (USA) 1986 | Razyana (USA); 1981 | His Majesty | Flower Bowl |
| Sire Danehill (USA) 1986 | Razyana (USA); 1981 | Spring Adieu | Buckpasser |
| Sire Danehill (USA) 1986 | Razyana (USA); 1981 | Spring Adieu | Natalma |
| Dam Cocotte (GB) 1983 | Troy (GB); 1976 | Petingo | Petition |
| Dam Cocotte (GB) 1983 | Troy (GB); 1976 | Petingo | Alcazar |
| Dam Cocotte (GB) 1983 | Troy (GB); 1976 | La Milo | Hornbeam |
| Dam Cocotte (GB) 1983 | Troy (GB); 1976 | La Milo | Pin Prick |
| Dam Cocotte (GB) 1983 | Gay Milly (GB); 1977 | Mill Reef | Never Bend |
| Dam Cocotte (GB) 1983 | Gay Milly (GB); 1977 | Mill Reef | Milan Mill |
| Dam Cocotte (GB) 1983 | Gay Milly (GB); 1977 | Gaily | Sir Gaylord |
| Dam Cocotte (GB) 1983 | Gay Milly (GB); 1977 | Gaily | Spearfish |

- Fine Motion is inbred 4 × 4 to Natalma (within the sire line) and 5 × 4 to Petition.
- Her older half-brother Pilsudski won the 1996 Breeders' Cup Turf and the 1997 Japan Cup.
- Her half-sister Honey Ban is the granddam of Yoka Yoka, who won the 2021 Kitakyushu Kinen.
- Her extended family includes Tamuro Cherry (2001 Hanshin Juvenile Fillies), Youmzain (2006 Preis von Europa, 2008 Grand Prix de Saint-Cloud) and Red Kingdom (2014 Nakayama Daishogai).
