= Deep Brillante =

Japanese Thoroughbred racehorse (2009–2026)

Deep Brillante ディープブリランテ
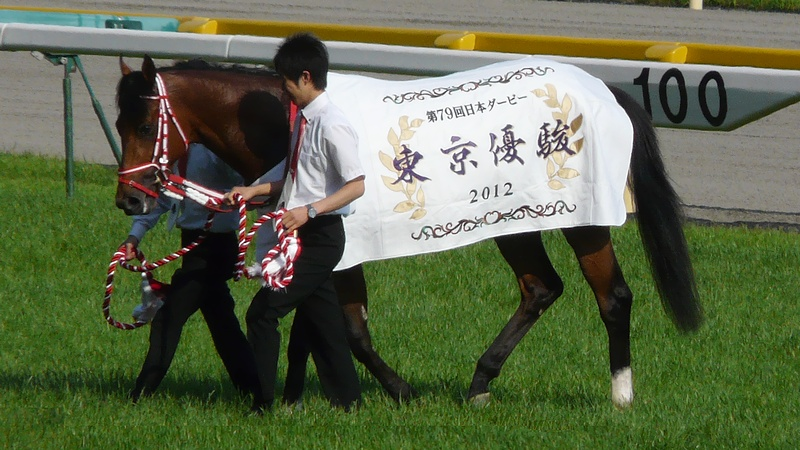
- Deep Brillante in 2012
- Breed: Thoroughbred
- Sire: Deep Impact
- Grandsire: Sunday Silence
- Dam: Love and Bubbles
- Damsire: Loup Sauvage
- Sex: Stallion
- Foaled: 8 May 2009
- Died: 23 October 2026 (aged 17)
- Country: Japan
- Colour: Bay
- Breeder: Paca Paca Farm
- Owner: Sunday Racing Co. Ltd.
- Racing colours
- Trainer: Yoshito Yahagi
- Jockey: Yasunari Iwata
- Record: 7: 3–2–1
- Earnings: ¥292,056,000

Major wins
- Tokyo Sports Hai Nisai Stakes (2011); Japanese Classic Race wins: Tokyo Yushun (2012)

Deep Brillante (Japanese: ディープブリランテ, Hepburn: Dīpu Burirante; 8 May 2009 – 23 October 2026) was a Japanese thoroughbred racehorse and sire. He showed very promising form in 2011, winning both his races, including the Grade 3 Tokyo Sports Hai Nisai Stakes. In the following spring, he ran prominently in several major races, including the Satsuki Sho, before stepping up in distance and winning the Tokyo Yushun (Japanese Derby). He was then sent to Europe where he ran poorly in the King George VI and Queen Elizabeth Stakes. He did not race again and was retired to stud in October 2012, where he produced several grade winning racehorses.

== Background ==
Deep Brillante was a bay horse standing 16.1 hands high with two white socks bred in Japan by the Paca Paca Farm. He was from the second crop of foals sired by Deep Impact, who was the Japanese Horse of the Year in 2005 and 2006, winning races including the Tokyo Yushun, Tenno Sho, Arima Kinen and Japan Cup. Deep Impact's other progeny include Gentildonna, Harp Star, Kizuna and A Shin Hikari. Deep Brillante's dam, Love and Bubbles, was an American-bred, French-trained mare who won the Prix Chloé in 2004. She was a great-granddaughter of Bubble Company, a broodmare whose other descendants have included Bubble Gum Fellow and That's the Plenty (Kikuka Sho).

As a foal Deep Brillante was offered for sale and bought for ¥32,550,000 by representatives of Sunday Racing Co. Ltd. He was sent into training with Yoshito Yahagi and was ridden in all of his races by Yasunari Iwata.

== Racing career ==
=== 2011: two-year-old season ===
Deep Brillante made his racecourse debut in a contest for previously unraced horses over 1800 metres at Hanshin Racecourse on 1 October 2011 and won by five lengths from Ebony Knight and ten others. On 19 November, the colt was stepped up in class for the Grade 3 Tokyo Sports Hai Nisai Stakes at Tokyo Racecourse and started 7/5 favourite ahead of fourteen opponents headed by Just A Way and Ennead. Deep Brillante took the lead 400 metres from the finish and won "comfortably" by three lengths from the 54/1 outsider Fujimasa Emperor.

In the JRA Awards for 2011, Deep Brillante finished third behind Alfredo and Adam's Peak in the poll to determine the champion Japanese two-year-old colt of 2011.

=== 2012: three-year-old season ===
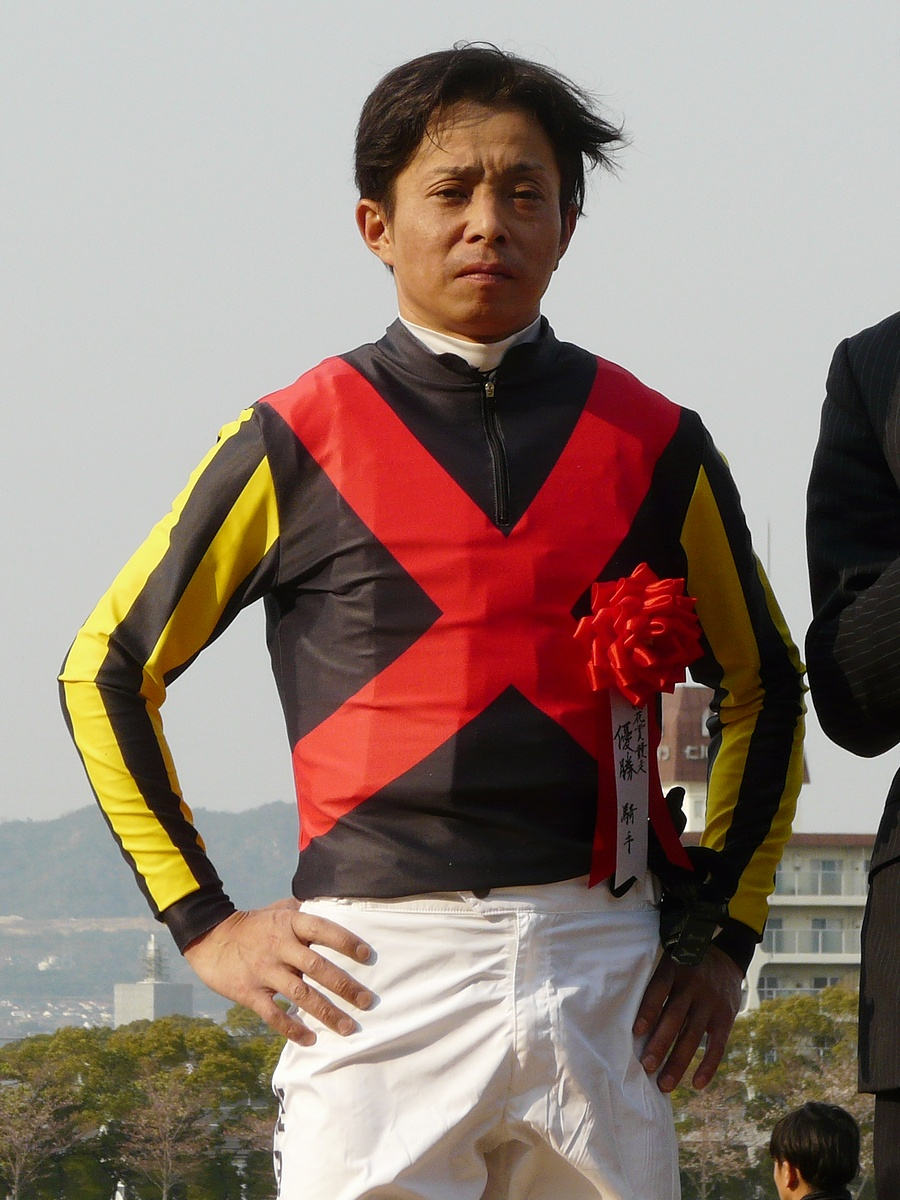
Yasunari Iwata, who rode Deep Brillante in all of his races

On his 2012 debut, Deep Brillante started odds-on favourite for the Grade 3 Kyodo Tsushin Hai over 1800 metres at Tokyo on 12 February. He led for most of the way but was overtaken by Gold Ship 100 metres from the finish and beaten one and three-quarters lengths into second. In March he again headed the betting when he contested the Grade 2 Spring Stakes at Nakayama Racecourse. After racing in fourth, he took the lead in the straight and went clear of his rivals before faltering in the closing stages and being beaten by Grandezza. Despite consecutive defeats, Yahagi kept his faith in the horse, describing him as having "tremendous potential". Deep Brillante started third favourite for the Grade 1 Satsuki Sho at Nakayama on 15 April and finished third of the eighteen runners behind Gold Ship and World Ace.

The 79th running of the Tokyo Yushun took place over 2400 metres on firm ground at Tokyo on 27 May. World Ace headed the betting from Gold Ship with Deep Brillante third choice on 7.5/1. The other runners included Grandezza, Just A Way, Alfredo, Fenomeno and Historical (Mainichi Hai). In the build-up to the race the colt's groom had praised his attitude and temperament saying "He's so calm usually it's almost frightening. He doesn't need any babysitting whatsoever. He's an intelligent horse, and he always runs his heart out in races". After tracking the leaders Iwata sent the colt into third approaching the final turn before taking the lead 200 metres out. In an extremely tight finish Deep Brillante held on to win by a nose from Fenomeno, with Tosen Homareboshi, World Ace, Gold Ship and Cosmo Ozora close behind. Less than two lengths covered the first six finishers. After the race Iwata, who was winning the race for the first time, said "Praise him not me. It was his guts that won it as he was completely empty at the finish. I have always thought he was the best horse in this generation so we trained him very hard to get a big success. We thought he was the best one and I am proud that we could prove it."

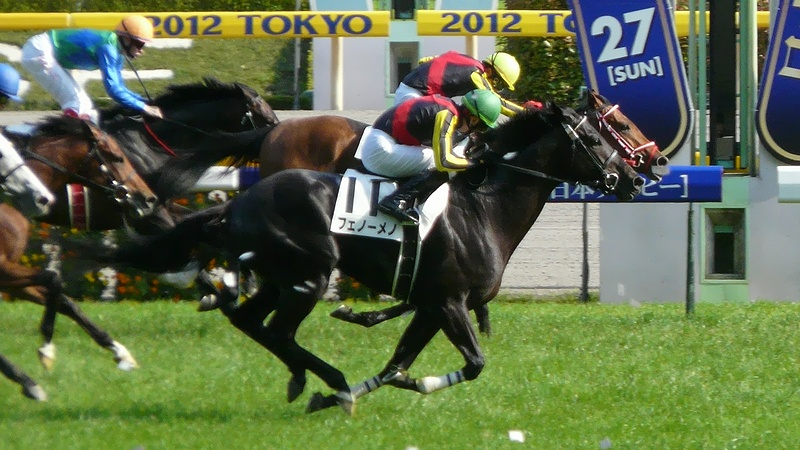
Deep Brillante (yellow cap) snatched the win by a nose against fellow Sunday Racing horse, Fenomeno (green cap) in 2012 Tokyo Yushun.

Deep Brillante with his jockey, Yasunari Iwata, fully depleted after the 2012 Tokyo Yushun win.

After his win at Tokyo, Deep Brillante's connections took the unusual decision to send the colt to England and match him against older horses in the King George VI and Queen Elizabeth Stakes at Ascot Racecourse on 21 July. He started a 20/1 outsider and was never in contention, finishing eighth of the ten runners behind the German mare Danedream.

Deep Brillante's retirement was announced on 26 October. Yahagi commented, "It's a terrible shame that the fans won't be able to see him race again. The little more than a year that I spent with this horse has been like a dream and for me he was nothing short of a treasure."

== Racing form ==
Deep Brillante had won three races in seven starts. All the races were on turf.

Date	Track	Race	Grade	Distance (Condition)	Entry	HN	Odds (Favored)	Finish	Time	Margins	Jockey	Winner (Runner-up)
2011 – two-year-old season
4 Aug	Hanshin	2yo debut		1,800m (Firm)	12	10	1.2 (1)	1st	1:49.7	−0.8	Yasunari Iwata	(Ebony Knight)
19 Nov	Tokyo	Tokyo Sports Hai Nisai Stakes	3	1,800m (Heavy)	15	13	2.4 (1)	1st	1:52.7	−0.5	Yasunari Iwata	(Fujimasa Emperor)
2012 – three-year-old season
12 Feb	Tokyo	Kyodo News Service Hai	3	1,800m (Firm)	11	2	1.4 (1)	2nd	1:48.6	0.3	Yasunari Iwata	Gold Ship
18 Mar	Nakayama	Spring Stakes	2	1,800m (Soft)	14	9	2.2 (1)	2nd	1:50.9	0.2	Yasunari Iwata	Grandezza
15 Apr	Nakayama	Satsuki Sho	1	2,000m (Good)	18	6	6.2 (3)	3rd	2:01.8	0.5	Yasunari Iwata	Gold Ship
27 May	Tokyo	Tokyo Yushun	1	2,400m (Firm)	18	10	8.5 (3)	1st	2:23.8	0.0	Yasunari Iwata	(Fenomeno)
21 Jul	Ascot	King George VI & Queen Elizabeth Stakes	1	12f (Soft)	10	10	20/1 (6)	8th	2:34.2	2.6	Yasunari Iwata	Danedream

== Stud career ==
After being retired from racing Deep Brillante became a breeding stallion at the Shadai Stallion Station. His first crop of foals was born in 2014. In December 2018, Deep Brillante was moved from Shadai Stallion Station to Breeders Stallion Station. He died on 23 October 2026, at the age of 17, following surgery for a bladder rupture.

=== Major winners ===
c = colt, f = filly

Grade winners
Foaled	Name	Sex	Major Wins
2014	Seda Brillantes	c	Radio Nikkei Sho, Nakayama Kimpai
2016	Mozu Bello	c	Nikkei Shinshun Hai
2020	Elton Barows	c	Radio Nikkei Sho, Mainichi Okan, Shirasagi Stakes

== Pedigree ==
Pedigree of Deep Brillante (JPN), bay stallion 2009
Sire Deep Impact (JPN) 2002	Sunday Silence (USA); 1986	Halo	Hail to Reason
Sire Deep Impact (JPN) 2002	Sunday Silence (USA); 1986	Halo	Cosmah
Sire Deep Impact (JPN) 2002	Sunday Silence (USA); 1986	Wishing Well	Understanding
Sire Deep Impact (JPN) 2002	Sunday Silence (USA); 1986	Wishing Well	Mountain Flower
Sire Deep Impact (JPN) 2002	Wind in Her Hair (IRE); 1991	Alzao	Lyphard
Sire Deep Impact (JPN) 2002	Wind in Her Hair (IRE); 1991	Alzao	Lady Rebecca
Sire Deep Impact (JPN) 2002	Wind in Her Hair (IRE); 1991	Burghclere	Busted
Sire Deep Impact (JPN) 2002	Wind in Her Hair (IRE); 1991	Burghclere	Highclere
Dam Love and Bubbles (USA) 2001	Loup Sauvage (USA); 1994	Riverman	Never Bend
Dam Love and Bubbles (USA) 2001	Loup Sauvage (USA); 1994	Riverman	River Lady
Dam Love and Bubbles (USA) 2001	Loup Sauvage (USA); 1994	Louveterie	Nureyev
Dam Love and Bubbles (USA) 2001	Loup Sauvage (USA); 1994	Louveterie	Lupe
Dam Love and Bubbles (USA) 2001	Bubble Dream (FR); 1993	Akarad	Labus
Dam Love and Bubbles (USA) 2001	Bubble Dream (FR); 1993	Akarad	Licata
Dam Love and Bubbles (USA) 2001	Bubble Dream (FR); 1993	Bubble Prospector	Miswaki
Dam Love and Bubbles (USA) 2001	Bubble Dream (FR); 1993	Bubble Prospector	Bubble Company (Family: 1-b)
