= Bubble Gum Fellow =

Japanese Thoroughbred racehorse

Bubble Gum Fellow バブルガムフェロー
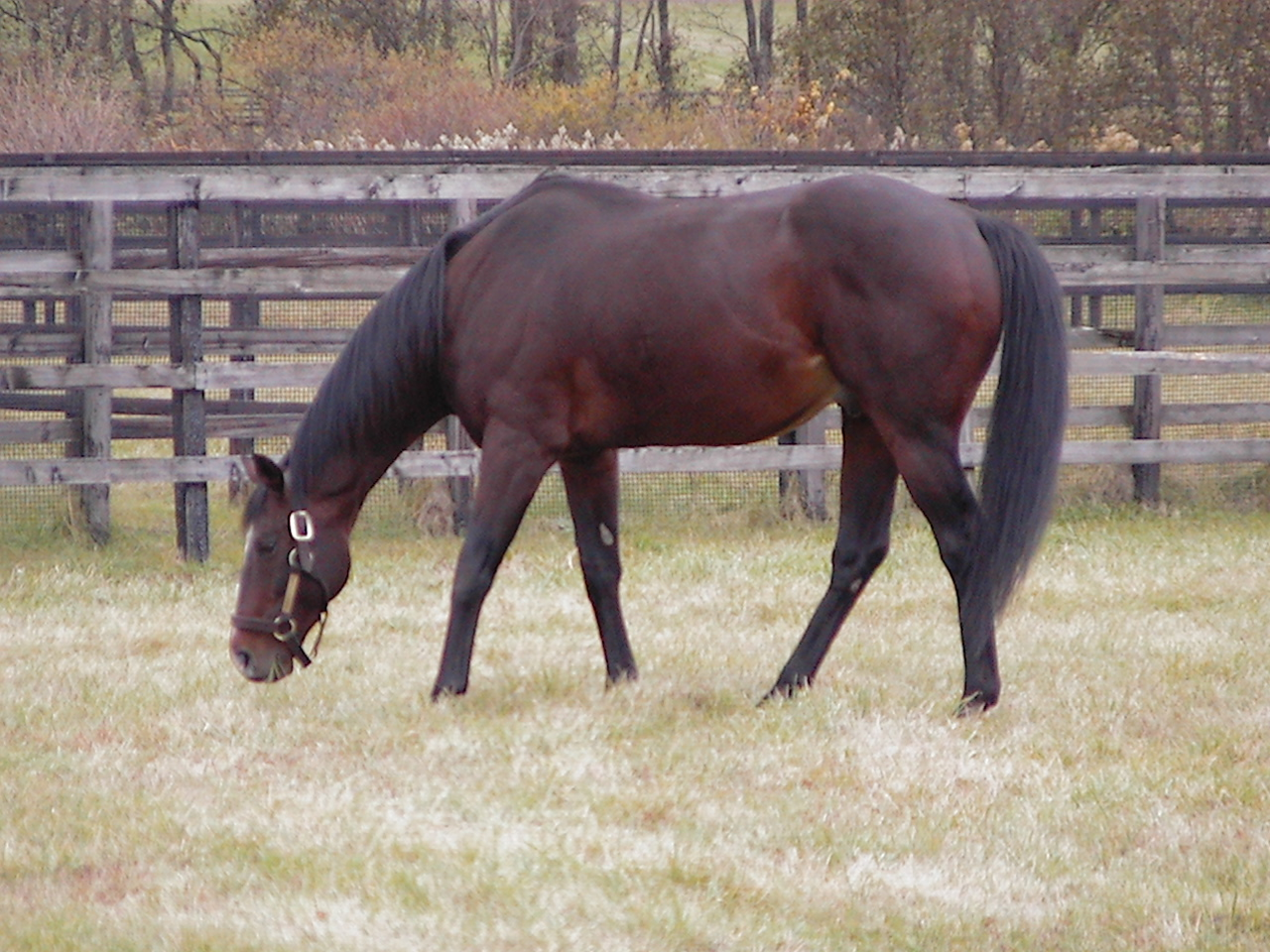
- Bubble Gum Fellow in 2008
- Sire: Sunday Silence
- Grandsire: Halo
- Dam: Bubble Company
- Damsire: Lyphard
- Sex: Stallion
- Foaled: April 11, 1993
- Died: April 26, 2010 (aged 17)
- Country: Japan
- Colour: Bay
- Breeder: Shadai Farm
- Owner: Shadai Racehorse Co Ltd
- Racing colours
- Trainer: Kazuo Fujisawa
- Jockey: Masayoshi Ebina; Yukio Okabe
- Record: 13: 7-2-3
- Earnings: ¥554,430,000

Major wins
- Tokyo Sports Hai Nisai Stakes (1995); Asahi Hai Sansai Stakes (1995); Spring Stakes (1996); Tenno Sho (Autumn) (1996); Naruo Kinen (1997); Mainichi Okan (1997)

Awards
- JRA Award for Best Two-Year-Old Colt (1995)

Bubble Gum Fellow (Japanese: バブルガムフェロー, Hepburn: Baburu Gamu Feroo; 11 April 1993 – 26 April 2010) was a Japanese Thoroughbred racehorse and sire. In 1995 he was rated the best juvenile colt of his generation in Japan when he won three of his four races including the Grade I Asahi Hai Sansai Stakes. In the following spring he won the Spring Stakes and then returned from a lengthy injury absence to win the autumn edition of the Tenno Sho. In 1997 he added wins in the Naruo Kinen and the Mainichi Okan before being retired to stud at the end of the season. Apart from his wins, he finished second in the Takarazuka Kinen and third in the Japan Cup. He had modest success as a breeding stallion in Japan and Australia before dying in 2010 at the age of seventeen.

== Background ==
Bubble Gum Fellow was a bay horse with a narrow white blaze bred by Shadai Farm, the breeding operation of his owners Shadai Racehorse Co Ltd. He was from the second crop of foals sired by Sunday Silence, who won the 1989 Kentucky Derby, before retiring to stud in Japan where he was champion sire on thirteen consecutive occasions. His other major winners included Deep Impact, Stay Gold, Heart's Cry, Manhattan Cafe, Zenno Rob Roy, Special Week, and Neo Universe.

His dam Bubble Company won one race in France before becoming a broodmare. She also produced Bubble Prospector, whose descendants have included Deep Brillante (Tokyo Yushun) and That's The Plenty (Kikuka Sho).

The colt was sent into training with Kazuo Fujisawa.

== Racing career ==
=== 1995: two-year-old season ===
Bubble Gum Fellow made his racecourse debut by finishing third to Abiru Sun God in a maiden race over 1800 metres at Tokyo Racecourse on 7 October and then won a similar event over the same course and distance three weeks later. In the Fuchu Sansai Stakes (again over 1800 metres at Tokyo) on 19 November he recorded his second victory, beating Sakura Speed and ten others. On his final start of the year, the colt was moved up in class but down in distance for the Grade I Asahi Hai Sansai Stakes over 1600 metres at Nakayama Racecourse on 7 December. Ridden by Yukio Okabe, he won by three quarters of a length from Eishin Guymon with a gap of two and a half lengths back to Generalist in third.

In January 1996, Bubble Gum Fellow was voted Best Two-Year-Old Colt in the JRA Awards for 1995.

=== 1996: three-year-old season ===
Bubble Gum Fellow began his second season in the Grade II Fuji TV Sho Spring Stakes (a major trial for the Satsuki Sho) over 1800 metres at Nakayama on 24 March and won from Cheers Silence and Cash Lavora. The colt then suffered from a serious injury to his right hind leg and was of the racecourse for five months. In his absence Ishino Sunday won the Satsuki Sho, whilst the Tokyo Yushun fell to Fusaichi Concorde.

Bubble Gum Fellow eventually returned for the Grade II Mainichi Okan at Tokyo on 6 October, a race which saw him matched against older horses for the first time. He finished third of the twelve runners behind the British-trained four-year-old Annus Mirabilis and the six-year-old Toyo Lyphard. Three weeks later the colt was one of seventeen horses to contest the autumn edition of the Tenno Sho over 2000 metres at Tokyo. His opponents included Mayano Top Gun (Kikuka Sho, Arima Kinen, Takarazuka Kinen, Tenno Sho (spring)), Genuine (Satsuki Sho, Mile Championship), Marvelous Sunday (Takarazuka Kinen) and Sakura Laurel (Tenno Sho (spring), Arima Kinen). Ridden by Masayoshi Ebina Bubble Gum Fellow got the best of a closely contested finish, winning by half a length, a neck and a head from Mayano Top Gun, Sakura Laurel and Marvelous Sunday. On his final race as a three-year-old, Bubble Gum Fellow started second favourite behind Helissio of the Japan Cup on 24 November but after reaching seventh place in the straight he quickly faded and finished thirteenth of the fifteen runners behind Singspiel.

=== 1997: four-year-old season ===
Bubble Gum Fellow began his third season in the Grade II Naruo Kinen over 2000 metres at Hanshin Racecourse on 15 June and won from Tokai Taro and Dance Partner (Yushun Himba, Queen Elizabeth II Commemorative Cup). At the same track in July he contested the Grade I Takarazuka Kinen and was beaten a neck into second by Marvelous Sunday with Dance Partner in third.

As in 1996, Bubble Gum Fellow began his autumn campaign in the Mainichi Okan and won from Tsukuba Symphony and Speed World. He then attempted to repeat his previous success in the Tenno Sho but was beaten a neck by the four-year-old filly Air Groove with a gap of five lengths back to Genuine in third. On 23 November, Bubble Gum Fellow started 2.7/1 favourite in a fourteen-runner field for the xth running of the Japan Cup. Ridden by Okabe, he turned into the straight in fifth place and made steady progress in the closing stages to finish third behind Pilsudski and Air Groove.

== Racing form ==
Bubble Gum Fellow won seven races and gained five more podiums from 13 starts. This data available in JBIS and netkeiba.

Date	Track	Race	Grade	Distance (Condition)	Entry	HN	Odds (Favored)	Finish	Time	Margins	Jockey	Winner (Runner-up)
1995 – two-year-old season
Oct 7	Tokyo	2yo Newcomer		1,800 m (Firm)	12	1	1.3 (1)	3rd	1:53.7	0.0	Yukio Okabe	Abiru Sun God
Oct 29	Tokyo	2yo Maiden		1,800 m (Firm)	9	1	1.2 (1)	1st	1:49.3	–0.2	Yukio Okabe	(Toshin Atlas)
Nov 19	Tokyo	Fuchu Sansai Stakes	OP	1,800 m (Firm)	12	7	3.4 (2)	1st	1:50.0	–0.2	Yukio Okabe	(Sakura Speed O)
Dec 10	Nakayama	Asahi Hai Sansai Stakes	1	1,600 m (Firm)	12	4	2.6 (1)	1st	1:34.2	–0.1	Yukio Okabe	(Eishin Guymon)
1996 – three-year-old season
Mar 24	Nakayama	Spring Stakes	2	1,800 m (Firm)	13	2	1.5 (1)	1st	1:50.1	–0.1	Yukio Okabe	(Cheers Silence)
Oct 6	Tokyo	Mainichi Okan	2	1,800 m (Firm)	12	8	5.0 (2)	3rd	1:46.0	0.2	Yukio Okabe	Annus Mirabilis
Oct 27	Tokyo	Tennō Shō (Autumn)	1	2,000 m (Firm)	17	4	7.4 (3)	1st	1:58.7	–0.1	Masayoshi Ebina	(Mayano Top Gun)
Nov 24	Tokyo	Japan Cup	1	2,400 m (Firm)	15	6	3.7 (2)	13th	2:26.8	3.0	Yukio Okabe	Singspiel
1997 – four-year-old season
Jun 15	Hanshin	Naruo Kinen	2	1,800 m (Firm)	15	10	3.3 (2)	1st	2:01.4	–0.3	Yukio Okabe	(Tokai Taro)
Jul 6	Hanshin	Takarazuka Kinen	1	2,200 m (Firm)	12	6	3.5 (3)	2nd	2:11.9	0.0	Masayoshi Ebina	Marvelous Sunday
Oct 5	Tokyo	Mainichi Okan	2	1,800 m (Firm)	9	6	2.0 (1)	1st	1:46.1	–0.1	Yukio Okabe	(Tsukuba Symphony)
Oct 26	Tokyo	Tennō Shō (Autumn)	1	2,000 m (Firm)	16	7	1.5 (1)	2nd	1:59.0	0.0	Yukio Okabe	Air Groove
Nov 23	Tokyo	Japan Cup	1	2,400 m (Firm)	14	13	3.7 (1)	3rd	2:26.0	0.2	Yukio Okabe	Pilsudski

Legend:
Turf

== Stud record ==
Bubble Gum Fellow was retired to become a breeding stallion in Japan and was also shuttled to stand for part of the year in Australia. The best of his offspring included the Graded race winners Appare Appare, Candy Vale (Sunline Stakes), Toshi Candy, Early Robusto, Onoyu and Meiner Bowknot. He died of pneumonia at the Breeders Stallion Station (Hokkaido) on 26 April 2010 at the age of 17.

== In popular culture ==
An anthropomorphized version of Bubble Gum Fellow appears as a character in Umamusume: Pretty Derby, voiced by Sayaka Kamitani.

== Pedigree ==
Pedigree of Bubble Gum Fellow (JPN), bay stallion 1993
Sire Sunday Silence (USA) 1986	Halo (USA); 1969	Hail to Reason	Turn-To
Sire Sunday Silence (USA) 1986	Halo (USA); 1969	Hail to Reason	Nothirdchance
Sire Sunday Silence (USA) 1986	Halo (USA); 1969	Cosmah	Cosmic Bomb
Sire Sunday Silence (USA) 1986	Halo (USA); 1969	Cosmah	Almahmoud
Sire Sunday Silence (USA) 1986	Wishing Well (USA); 1975	Understanding	Promised Land
Sire Sunday Silence (USA) 1986	Wishing Well (USA); 1975	Understanding	Pretty Ways
Sire Sunday Silence (USA) 1986	Wishing Well (USA); 1975	Mountain Flower	Montparnasse
Sire Sunday Silence (USA) 1986	Wishing Well (USA); 1975	Mountain Flower	Edelweiss
Dam Bubble Company (FR) 1977	Lyphard (USA); 1969	Northern Dancer	Nearctic
Dam Bubble Company (FR) 1977	Lyphard (USA); 1969	Northern Dancer	Natalma
Dam Bubble Company (FR) 1977	Lyphard (USA); 1969	Goofed	Court Martial
Dam Bubble Company (FR) 1977	Lyphard (USA); 1969	Goofed	Barra
Dam Bubble Company (FR) 1977	Prodice (FR); 1969	Prominer	Beau Sabreur
Dam Bubble Company (FR) 1977	Prodice (FR); 1969	Prominer	Snob Hill
Dam Bubble Company (FR) 1977	Prodice (FR); 1969	Eurydice	Tabriz
Dam Bubble Company (FR) 1977	Prodice (FR); 1969	Eurydice	Euroclydon (Family 1-b)
