= Tennō Shō (Autumn) =

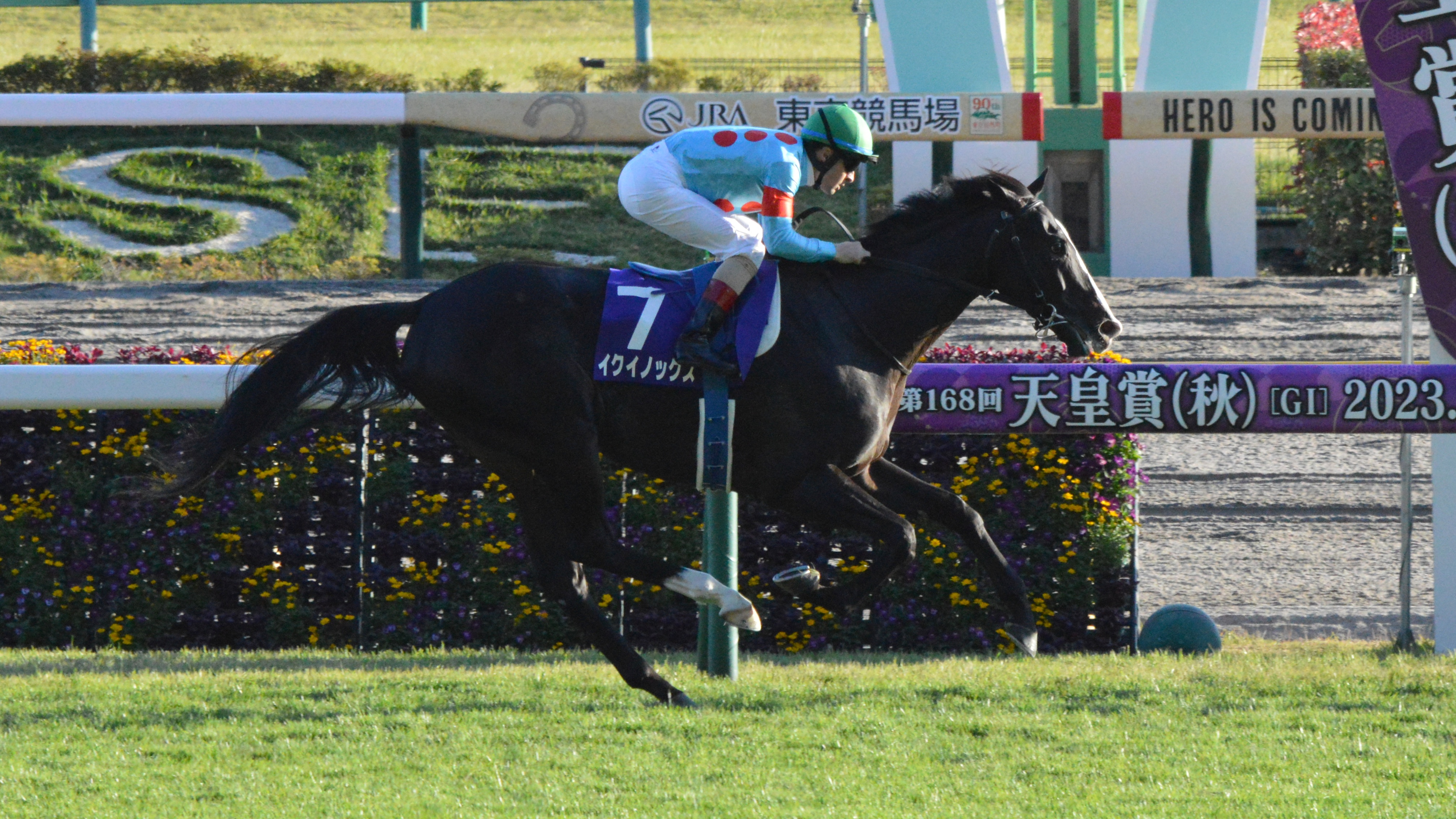
- Equinox winning the 168th Tennō Shō
- Class: Int'l Grade 1
- Location: Tokyo Racecourse, Fuchu, Tokyo
- Inaugurated: December 3, 1937
- Race type: Thoroughbred
- Website: japanracing.jp

Race information
- Distance: 2000 meters (About 10 furlongs / 1 1/4 miles)
- Surface: Turf
- Track: Left-handed
- Qualification: 3-y-o & Up, Thoroughbreds
- Weight: 3-y-o 56 kg \ 4-y-o & up 58 kg Allowances; 2 kg for fillies and mares
- Purse: ¥ 648,000,000 (as of 2025): 1st: ¥ 300,000,000; 2nd: ¥ 120,000,000; 3rd: ¥ 75,000,000
- Bonuses: Winner of the following in the same year: Tenno Sho (Autumn), Japan Cup, Arima Kinen; Domestic: ¥ 300,000,000; International: ¥ 150,000,000; Winner of any three of the following in the same year: Ōsaka Hai, Tenno Sho (Spring/Autumn), Japan Cup, Takarazuka Kinen, Arima Kinen; Domestic: ¥ 200,000,000; International: ¥ 100,000,000

The Tennō Shō (Autumn) (天皇賞（秋）; lit. 'Emperor Prize (Autumn)') is an International Grade I horse race held at Tokyo Racecourse, Japan in late October or early November. It is run over a distance of 2,000 metres (6,600 ft) on turf. It is considered the first leg of the Japanese Autumn Triple Crown, the other two being the Japan Cup and the Arima Kinen.

Originally, the Autumn Tennō Shō was run over a distance of 3,200 metres (10,500 ft), but was shortened to its current distance in 1984 to promote middle-distance horses and to promote 3-year-old horses as a shorter-distance alternative to the Kikuka Sho, the Japanese St. Leger, which is 3,000 metres (9,800 ft).

== History ==
=== Early years ===
One of the origin of the Tennō Shō is The Emperor's Cup first contested at Negishi Racecourse in 1905, prized from the Emperor for the winner, and later renamed as Teishitsu Goshōten until 1937. Another origin is Yushō Naikokusanba Rengō Kyōsō run over 3,200 metres, held twice a year between 1911 and 1937 to determine the best horse of the year. The Tennō Shō was established in 1937 to unify these prestigious races under the name of the Emperor, and therefore it is regarded as the most prestigious horse race in Japan since then.

Prior to 1980, a horse winning a Tennō Shō was not allowed to participate in future editions of the race again, but this ban was lifted in 1981.

Contrary to the Tennō Shō (Spring) held at Kyoto Racecourse, that has only one mare winner Leda in 1953, there are 10 mare winners at the Tennō Shō (Autumn) when its distance was 3,200 metres until 1983; Hisatomo (1938), Nipatois (1942), Yashima Daughter (1950), Queen Narubi (1953), Opal Orchid (1954), Cellulose (1958), Garnet (1959), Kurihide (1962), Tomei (1971) and Pretty Cast (1980) are the mare winners of this race.

=== Recent years ===
In 1984, the Japan Racing Association introduced Group races into their big races, and Tennō Shō is designated as Grade 1 (domestic grade at that time). At the same time the distance of the Tennō Shō (Autumn) was shortened from 3,200 metres to 2,000 metres, while the Tennō Shō (Spring) held at Kyoto Racecourse remained its distance as 3,200 metres, thus the Tennō Shō (Autumn) has changed its characteristics to determine best middle-distance horse, while Tennō Shō (Spring) remained its characteristics to determine best stayer.

Prior to 2000, the participants of the Tennō Shō was limited to the horses born and trained in Japan. In 2000, maximum of two foreign-bred horses trained in Japan acquired the rights to participate the race, and then became an international horse race in 2005, maximum of five foreign-trained horses can run the race. In 2008, the race also became open to geldings.

Since the distance of the race was shortened to 2,000 metres in 1984, there are five mare winners at the Tennō Shō (Autumn); Air Groove (1997), Heavenly Romance (2005), Vodka (2008), Buena Vista (2010) and Almond Eye (2019 and 2020) are the mare winners of this race.

The current record holder for this race is Equinox who set up a time of 1:55.2 in 2023, beating previous record holder Tosen Jordan by point nine seconds.

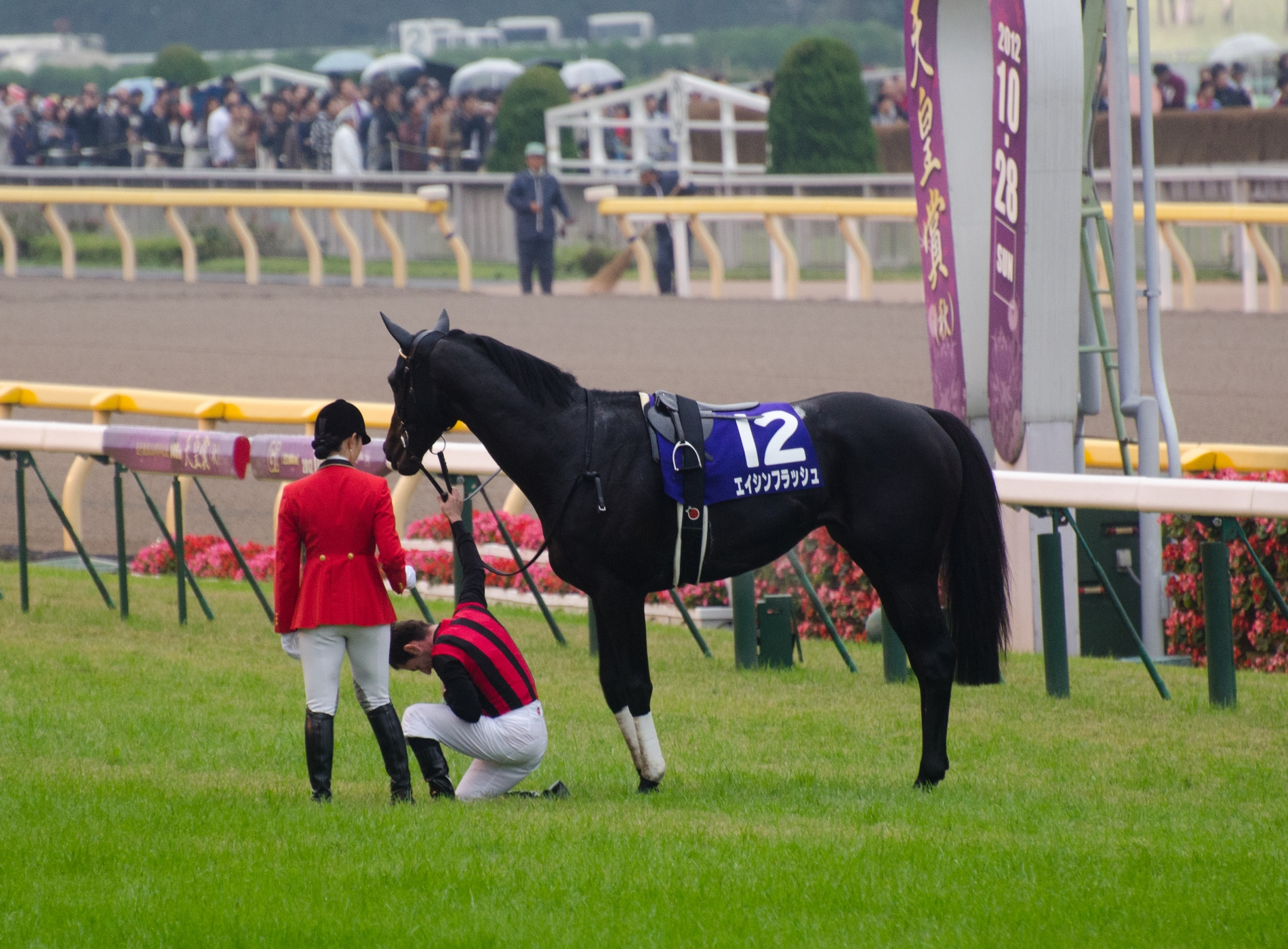
Mirco Demuro dismounted from Eishin Flash, then kneeled and performed a profound bow to the Emperor and the Empress after winning the 2012 Tennō Shō (Autumn)

The Tennō Shō (Autumn) was held in the Emperor's presence three times, in 2005, 2012 and 2023. Winning jockey in 2005 (Mikio Matsunaga, riding on Heavenly Romance) and 2023 (Christophe Lemaire, riding on Equinox) made profound obeisance to the Emperor and the Empress riding on the winner, and in 2012, Mirco Demuro kneeled and performed a profound bow to the Emperor and the Empress after dismounting from the winner Eishin Flash.

== Trial races ==
Trial races provide automatic berths to the winning horses.

Race	Grade	Racecourse	Distance	Condition
Sankei Sho All Comers	GII	Nakayama	2,200 metres	Winner
Mainichi Okan	GII	Tokyo	1,800 metres	Winner
Kyoto Daishoten	GII	Kyoto	2,400 metres	Winner

== Winners since 1984 ==
Year	Winner	Age	Jockey	Trainer	Owner	Time
1984	Mr. C.B.	4	Masato Yoshinaga	Yasuhisa Matsuyama	Chigira Bokujo	1:59.3
1985	Gallop Dyna	5	Yasuhiro Nemoto	Susumu Yano	Shadai Racehorse	1:58.7
1986	Sakura Yutaka O	4	Futoshi Kojima	Katsutaro Sakai	Sakura Commerce	1:58.3
1987	Nippo Teio	4	Hiroyuki Gohara	Kinzo Kubota	Yuichi Yamaishi	1:59.7
1988	Tamamo Cross	4	Katsumi Minai	Isami Obara	Tamamo Co., Ltd.	1:58.8
1989	Super Creek	4	Yutaka Take	Shuji Ito	Makoto Kikura	1:59.1
1990	Yaeno Muteki	5	Yukio Okabe	Mitsuo Ogino	Fuji Ltd.	1:58.2
1991	Prekrasnie ^{[1]}	4	Teruo Eda	Terumaso Yano	Eijiro Tajima	2:03.9
1992	Let's Go Tarquin	5	Shoichi Osaki	Kojiro Hashiguchi	Diners Club Japan	1:58.6
1993	Yamanin Zephyr	4	Yoshitomi Shibata	Hironori Kurita	Hajime Doi	1:58.9
1994	Nehai Caesar	4	Katsumi Shiomura	Akira Huse	Daimaru Enterprise	1:58.6
1995	Sakura Chitose O	5	Futoshi Kojima	Katsutaro Sakai	Sakura Commerce	1:58.8
1996	Bubble Gum Fellow	3	Masayoshi Ebina	Kazuo Fujisawa	Shadai Racehorse	1:58.7
1997	Air Groove	4	Yutaka Take	Yuji Ito	Lucky Field Co Ltd	1:59.0
1998	Offside Trap	7	Yoshitomi Shibata	Shuho Kato	Takashi Watanabe	1:59.3
1999	Special Week	4	Yutaka Take	Toshiaki Shirai	Hiroyoshi Usuda	1:58.0
2000	T. M. Opera O	4	Ryuji Wada	Ichizo Iwamoto	Masatsugu Takezono	1:59.9
2001	Agnes Digital	4	Hirofumi Shii	Toshiaki Shirai	Takao Watanabe	2:02.0
2002	Symboli Kris S ^{[2]}	3	Yukio Okabe	Kazuo Fujisawa	Symboli Stud	1:58.5
2003	Symboli Kris S	4	Olivier Peslier	Kazuo Fujisawa	Symboli Stud	1:58.0
2004	Zenno Rob Roy	4	Olivier Peslier	Kazuo Fujisawa	Shinobu Osako	1:58.9
2005	Heavenly Romance	5	Mikio Matsunaga	Masashi Yamamoto	North Hills Management	2:00.1
2006	Daiwa Major	5	Katsumi Ando	Hiroyuki Uehara	Keizou Ooshiro	1:58.8
2007	Meisho Samson	4	Yutaka Take	Shigetada Takahashi	Yoshio Matsumoto	1:58.4
2008	Vodka	4	Yutaka Take	Katsuhiko Sumii	Yuzo Tanimizu	1:57.2
2009	Company ^{[3]}	8	Norihiro Yokoyama	Hidetaka Otonashi	Eiko Kondou	1:57.2
2010	Buena Vista	4	Christophe Soumillon	Hiroyoshi Matsuda	Sunday Racing Co Ltd	1:58.2
2011	Tosen Jordan	5	Nicola Pinna	Yasutoshi Ikee	Takaya Shimakawa	1:56.1
2012	Eishin Flash	5	Mirco Demuro	Hideaki Fujiwara	Toyomitsu Hirai	1:57.3
2013	Just A Way	4	Yuichi Fukunaga	Naosuke Sugai	Akatsuki Yamatoya	1:57.5
2014	Spielberg	5	Hiroshi Kitamura	Kazuo Fujisawa	Hidetoshi Yamamoto	1:59.7
2015	Lovely Day	5	Suguru Hamanaka	Yasutoshi Ikee	Kaneko Makoto Holdings	1:58.4
2016	Maurice	5	Ryan Moore	Noriyuki Hori	Kazumi Yoshida	1:59.3
2017	Kitasan Black	5	Yutaka Take	Hisashi Shimizu	Ono Shoji	2:08.3
2018	Rey de Oro	4	Christophe Lemaire	Kazuo Fujisawa	U Carrot Farm	1:56.8
2019	Almond Eye	4	Christophe Lemaire	Sakae Kunieda	Silk Racing	1:56.2
2020	Almond Eye	5	Christophe Lemaire	Sakae Kunieda	Silk Racing	1:57.8
2021	Efforia	3	Takeshi Yokoyama	Yuichi Shikato	Carrot Farm	1:57.9
2022	Equinox	3	Christophe Lemaire	Tetsuya Kimura	Silk Racing	1:57.5
2023	Equinox	4	Christophe Lemaire	Tetsuya Kimura	Silk Racing	1:55.2
2024	Do Deuce	5	Yutaka Take	Yasuo Tomomichi	Kieffers Co. Ltd.	1:57.3
2025	Masquerade Ball	3	Christophe Lemaire	Takahisa Tezuka	Shadai Race Horse Co. Ltd.	1:58.6
2026	Danon Decile	5	Keita Tosaki	Shogo Yasuda	Danox Co. Ltd	1:56.7

^{1} Mejiro McQueen finished first in 1991 but was demoted to last place following a Stewards' Inquiry.

^{2} The 2002 Autumn Tennō Shō was contested at Nakayama Racecourse, due to construction at Tokyo Racecourse.

^{3} Also Japanese record of flat racing for oldest horse winning first G1 race.

== Earlier winners ==
- 1937 – Happy Might
- 1938 - Hisatomo
- 1939 - Tetsumon
- 1940 – Rocky Mor
- 1941 - Estates
- 1942 - Nipatois
- 1943 - Kuri Hikari
- 1944 - No race
- 1945 - No race
- 1946 - No race
- 1947 - Toyo Ume
- 1948 - Katsu Fuji
- 1949 - Newford
- 1950 - Yashima Daughter
- 1951 - Hatakaze
- 1952 - Track O
- 1953 - Queen Narubi
- 1954 - Opal Orchid
- 1955 - Dainana Hoshu
- 1956 - Midfarm
- 1957 - Hakuchikara
- 1958 - Cellulose
- 1959 - Garnet
- 1960 - Ote Mon
- 1961 - Takamagahara
- 1962 - Kurihide
- 1963 - Ryu Forel
- 1964 - Yamato Kyodai
- 1965 - Shinzan
- 1966 - Korehide
- 1967 - Kabuto Ciro
- 1968 - Knit Eight
- 1969 - Mejiro Taiyo
- 1970 - Mejiro Asama
- 1971 - Tomei
- 1972 - Yamanin Wave
- 1973 - Tani no Chikara
- 1974 - Kami no Tesio
- 1975 - Fujino Parthia
- 1976 - Eyeful
- 1977 - Hokuto Boy
- 1978 - Tenmei
- 1979 - Three Giants
- 1980 - Pretty Cast
- 1981 - Hoyo Boy
- 1982 - Mejiro Titan
- 1983 - Kyoei Promise

== See also ==
- Tennō Shō
- Tennō Shō (Spring)
- Horse racing in Japan
- List of Japanese flat horse races
