= Tokyo Sports Hai Nisai Stakes =

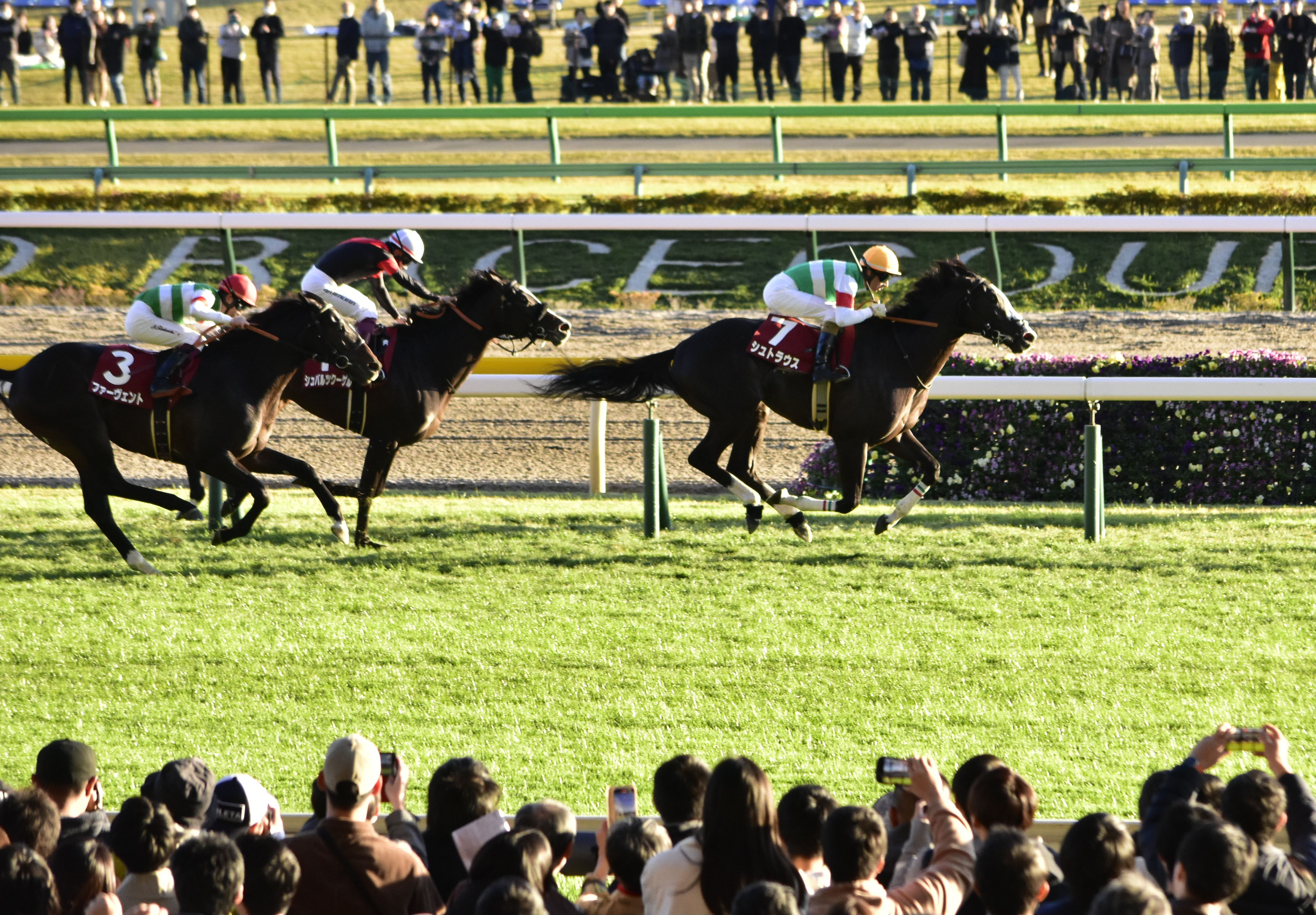
- Strauss wins the 2023 Tokyo Sports Hai Nisai Stakes
- Class: Grade 2
- Location: Tokyo Racecourse
- Inaugurated: 1966
- Race type: Thoroughbred Flat racing

Race information
- Distance: 1800 metres
- Surface: Turf
- Track: Left-handed
- Qualification: 2-y-o
- Weight: Colts 56 kg, Fillies 55 kg
- Purse: ¥ 82,380,000 (as of 2024): 1st: ¥ 38,000,000; 2nd: ¥ 15,000,000; 3rd: ¥ 10,000,000

The Tokyo Sports Hai Nisai Stakes (Japanese 東京スポーツ杯2歳ステークス) is a Grade 2 horse race for two-year-old Thoroughbreds in Japan, run in November over a distance of 1800 metres at the Tokyo Racecourse.

The race was first run in 1966 and was promoted to Grade 3 status in 1996. It was run at Nakayama Racecourse in 2002. Past winners have included Bubble Gum Fellow, Nakayama Festa, Rose Kingdom, Deep Brillante, Isla Bonita, Satono Crown and Wagnerian. The race was elevated to Grade 2 class in 2021.

== Winners since 2000 ==
Year	Winner	Jockey	Trainer	Owner	Time
2000	Tagano Teio	Shinji Fujita	Hiroshi Matsuda	Ryoji Yagi	1:48.5
2001	Admire Max	Yuichi Fukunaga	Mitsuru Hashida	Riichi Kondo	1:48.2
2002	Blue Eleven	Yutaka Take	Katsuhiko Sumii	Makoto Kaneko	1:50.2
2003	Admire Big	Yutaka Take	Mitsuru Hashida	Riichi Kondo	1:48.9
2004	Smooth Baritone	Masayoshi Ebina	Sakae Kunieda	Makoto Kaneko	1:48.2
2005	Fusaichi Richard	Yuichi Fukunaga	Kunihide Matsuda	Fusao Sekiguchi	1:46.9
2006	Fusaichi Ho O	Katsumi Ando	Kunihide Matsuda	Fusao Sekiguchi	1:48.7
2007	Fusaichi Assort	Norihiro Yokoyama	Takaki Iwato	Fusao Sekiguchi	1:47.4
2008	Nakayama Festa	Masayoshi Ebina	Yoshitaka Ninomiya	Nobuko Izumi	1:47.7
2009	Rose Kingdom	Futoshi Komaki	Kojiro Hashiguchi	Sunday Racing	1:48.2
2010	Sadamu Patek	Christophe Soumillon	Masato Nishizono	Sada Onishi	1:47.3
2011	Deep Brillante	Yasunari Iwata	Yoshito Yahagi	Sunday Racing	1:52.7
2012	Codino	Norihiro Yokoyama	Kazuo Fujisawa	Sunday Racing	1:46.0
2013	Isla Bonita	Masayoshi Ebina	Hironori Kurita	Shadai Race Horse	1:45.9
2014	Satono Crown	Ryan Moore	Noriyuki Hori	Hajime Satomi	1:47.9
2015	Smart Odin	Yutaka Take	Kunihide Matsuda	Toru Okawa	1:49.5
2016	Bless Journey	Yoshitomi Shibata	Shinobu Honma	Takaya Shimakawa	1:48.3
2017	Wagnerian	Yuichi Fukunaga	Yasuo Tomomichi	Kaneko Makoto Holdings	1:46.6
2018	Nishino Daisy	Masaki Katsuura	Noboru Takagi	Shigeyuki Nishiyama	1:46.6
2019	Contrail	Ryan Moore	Yoshito Yahagi	Shinji Maeda	1:44.5
2020	Danon The Kid	Yuga Kawada	Takayuki Yasuda	Danox	1:47.5
2021	Equinox	Christophe Lemaire	Tetsuya Kimura	Silk Racing	1:46.2
2022	Gastrique	Kosei Miura	Hiroyuki Uehara	Koji Maeda	1:45.8
2023	Strauss	Joao Moreira	Ryo Takei	Carrot Farm	1:46.5
2024	Croix du Nord	Yuichi Kitamura	Takashi Saito	Sunday Racing	1:46.8
2025	Peintre Naif	Christophe Lemaire	Tetsuya Kimura	Carrot Farm	1:46.0

== Earlier winners ==
- 1966 - Yamanin Cup
- 1967 - No Race
- 1968 - Suzu Sayaka
- 1969 - Suinoosa
- 1970 - Yashima Raiden
- 1971 - Suzu Boxer
- 1972 - Nasuno Chigusa
- 1973 - Kane Mikuni
- 1974 - Chateau de Symboli
- 1975 - Spirit Swaps
- 1976 - Maruzensky
- 1977 - Race Cancelled
- 1978 - Sea Bird Park
- 1979 - Liquid Wave
- 1980 - Hazel Blonde
- 1981 - Tosho Pegasus
- 1982 - Daring Power
- 1983 - Konrad Symboli
- 1984 - Sirius Symboli
- 1985 - Sweet Nadia
- 1986 - Sakura Rotary
- 1987 - Kokusai Triple
- 1988 - Sakura Hokuto O
- 1989 - Asahi Pasion
- 1990 - Sakura Yamato O
- 1991 - Matikanetannhauser
- 1992 - Surely Win
- 1993 - Ines Souther
- 1994 - Hokkai Rousseau
- 1995 - Bubble Gum Fellow
- 1996 - Godspeed
- 1997 - King Halo
- 1998 - Admire Cozzene
- 1999 - Joten Brave

== See also ==
- Horse racing in Japan
- List of Japanese flat horse races
