= Symboli Kris S =

American-bred Thoroughbred racehorse

Symboli Kris S シンボリクリスエス
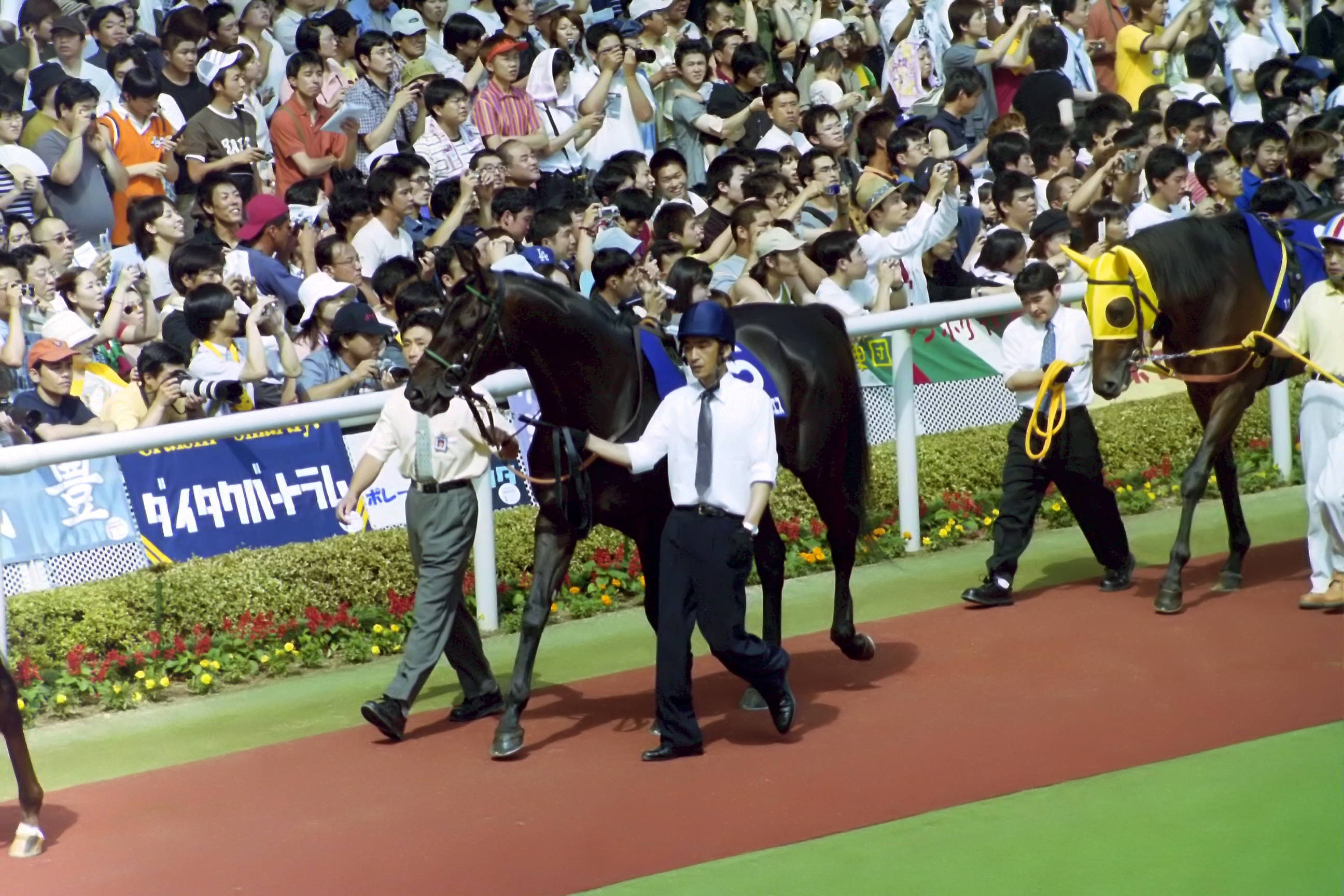
- Symboli Kris S at the paddock of the 2003 Takarazuka Kinen.
- Breed: Thoroughbred
- Sire: Kris S. (USA)
- Grandsire: Roberto (USA)
- Dam: Tee Kay (USA)
- Damsire: Gold Meridian (USA)
- Sex: Stallion
- Foaled: January 21, 1999; Mill Ridge Farm; Lexington, Kentucky
- Died: December 8, 2020 (aged 21); Symboli Farm, Narita, Chiba, Japan
- Country: United States
- Colour: Dark Bay
- Breeder: Takahiro Wada
- Owner: Symboli Stud
- Racing colours
- Trainer: Kazuo Fujisawa
- Jockey: Yukio Okabe; Olivier Peslier
- Record: 15: 8-2-4
- Earnings: ¥984,724,000 (US$11,531,995)

Major wins
- Aoba Sho (2002); Kobe Shimbun Hai (2002); Tenno Sho (Autumn) (2002, 2003); Arima Kinen (2002, 2003)

Awards
- Japanese Horse of the Year (2002, 2003); JRA Award for Best Three-Year-Old Colt (2002); JRA Award for Best Older Male Horse (2003)

Honours
- Timeform rating: 132

Symboli Kris S (Japanese: シンボリクリスエス, Hepburn: Shinbori Kurisu Esu; foaled January 21, 1999 – December 8, 2020) was an American-bred, Japan-based Thoroughbred racehorse and breeding stallion. He was voted Japanese Horse of the Year in 2002 and 2003. He was retired at the end of 2003 and was syndicated for $15 million.

From 2002 to 2003, Symboli Kris S achieved the first consecutive wins in the history of the Tennō Shō (Autumn) (GI) and became the fourth horse to achieve consecutive wins in the Arima Kinen (GI). In his final race, the 2003 Arima Kinen, he won by an overwhelming 9 lengths, a record margin for the race at the time.

== Background ==
Symboli Kris S, a dark bay stallion, was foaled on January 21, 1999, on Mill Ridge Farm in Lexington, Kentucky. He was sired by Kris S., an American Thoroughbred racehorse who is best known as a highly successful sire. Symboli Kris S was out of the American-bred mare Tee Kay, who won the Martha Washington Stakes (G3) in 1994, among other achievements, with a record of 31 races and 4 wins.

== Racing career ==
=== 2001: two-year-old season ===
Symboli Kris S made his debut on a 1600-metre maiden race at Tokyo Racecourse, where he won the race by a neck against the second-place finisher, Asakusa Kininaru.

=== 2002: three-year-old season ===
After his debut, his trainer, Kazuo Fujisawa, rested him for the next three and half months before racing again at the Saintpaulia Sho on January 27. Symboli Kris S scored podium in the next three races, achieving second place once and third place twice. Although these races showed good promise, the losses all followed the same pattern—a failure to catch up from the back. This prompted Fujisawa to change strategy during his fifth race, the Yamabuki Sho. In this race, Symboli Kris S took the lead from the start, maintained his position, and won the race by one and three-quarters length for his second career victory.

On April 27, Symboli Kris S would start in his first graded stakes race, the Aoba Sho. Instead of his normal jockey (Yukio Okabe), he would be controlled by Yutaka Take. Starting from gate 3 in stall 2, he positioned himself well on the inside. With 200 metres to go, he broke away from the inner rail and widened the gap. He crossed the finish line two and a half lengths ahead of Bamboo Juventus, who came from the far outside, and achieved his first graded stakes victory. This win allowed him to compete for the Tokyo Yushun (Japanese Derby).

For the Derby, Symboli Kris S was placed as the third favourite behind No Reason (Satsuki Sho's winner) and Tanino Gimlet (Satsuki's Sho third-place finisher). When the race began, he positioned himself in the mid-pack in the early phase. At the third corner, he started moving outside to gain advantage. He surpassed several horses like Machikane Akatsuki and Gold Allure for the lead. However, Tanino Gimlet caught up to him before the line with a late surge on the homestretch. Symboli Kris S finished second by one length.

He was rested for the summer in Monbetsu before resuming his season at the Kobe Shimbun Hai, a trial race for the Kikuka Sho. Just like in the Tokyo Yushun, Symboli Kris S stayed in the middle of the pack at the start. However, this time, he was blocked on the third corner and could not find a way to move to the outside. He delayed his burst on the final straight, a move that ended up propelling him past the rest of the field and giving him his second graded win, finishing two and a half lengths ahead of No Reason. Later, in his biography, his returning jockey Okabe described this race as a turning point for Symboli Kris S; before, he would generally have a slow start out the gate before gradually finding his pace, whereas in this race he took the initiative right from the start. This result also prompted Fujisawa to persuade Wada to switch the horse's next race from the Kikuka Sho to the Tenno Sho (Autumn), as he thought the horse was good enough to compete against the older competitors.

The autumn Tenno Sho would be held on the Nakayama Racecourse as the normal venue, Tokyo Racecourse, was undergoing renovations. He had a good start, positioning himself on the inner track in sixth out of the field of 18. The middle pack became more densely clogged near the third corner as the horses from the back tried to position themselves. Break Time and Ibuki Government blocked Symboli Kris S near the end of the third corner, but as T.M Ocean surged forward, Break Time marked that movement, a choice that created a gap between him and Ibuki Government. Symboli Kris S capitalized on that gap and pulled away from the pack with a burst of speed on the final straight. Narita Top Road, who had been waiting behind him for a while, made a late charge from the outside in the straight, but fell three-quarters of a length behind as he watched Symboli Kris S cross the finish line for his inaugural GI victory.

On November 24, Symboli Kris S competed in the Japan Cup, which also held in Nakayama due to the Tokyo Racecourse renovations. He was seeded fourth in the race behind horses like Narita Top Road, Jungle Pocket and No Reason. Symboli Kris S was jockeyed by Olivier Peslier, who made a mistake at the beginning that placed Kris S in the rear for the majority of the race. He tried to catch up the pack by making a move from the outside at the final corner, but ultimately ended up in third place behind two foreign-trained horses: the winner Falbrav and Sarafan. After the race, Peslier blamed the noisy horse beside them at the starting gate as the reason for the late start.

Symboli Kris S closed out his autumn campaign with a run in the Arima Kinen on December 22. He ranked second in the fan voting with 83,623 votes, just behind Narita Top Road. When the gate opened, Fine Motion and Tap Dance City battled for the early lead while Symboli Kris S stuck to the mid-pack like usual, waiting for the right time. At the final corner, Tap Dance City still had an eight-length lead over the rest of the field. Just entering the final straight, Symboli Kris S moved outside and sprinted forward past the other horses; his speed during this surge was said to give onlookers the impression that the other horses had all stopped in mid-run. He crossed the finish line half a length ahead of Tap Dance City, securing his second GI victory. Peslier commented after the win that Symboli Kris S was laser-focused on the win, and once the gap on the straight opened, he used his sharp legs to generate tremendous speed towards the finish.

For his excellent performance, Symboli Kris S won the JRA Award for Best Three-Year-Old Colt and was named the Japanese Horse of the Year. He gained 277 votes out of 281 for the former and almost unanimously won the latter by 280 votes out of 281. He became the third horse after Oguri Cap (1988) and El Condor Pasa (1998) to win the best three-year-old colt award without winning a classic race.

=== 2003: four-year-old season ===
Symboli Kris S was almost fully rested for the spring campaign as Fujisawa refused to put him on the Tenno Sho (Spring). Fujisawa believed the race's distance—the longest GI at 3200 metres—"was not for him" and also wanted to preserve his energy for the autumn campaign. He started the season with a run in the Takarazuka Kinen at the Hanshin Racecourse in June. For the race, he received the most votes with 59,817 votes in total. He was ridden by Kent Desormeaux for this race. This race, which featured the likes of Agnes Digital, Balance of Game, Daitaku Bertram, Dantsu Flame, Fast Tateyama, Hishi Miracle, Neo Universe, Tap Dance City and Tsurumaru Boy, was dubbed the "best field of the Takarazuka Kinen ever" at that time. Kris S's routine start was good and he took off in the middle pack. He tried for an outside move to pass Tap Dance City and succeeded. Unfortunately, his lack of pace for the day cost him the win as he was soon overtaken by Tap Dance City, Tsurumaru Boy and Hishi Miracle. He finished the race in fifth place. Fujisawa attributed this loss to the mistiming of taking the lead and also the erratic inward and outward movement by Symboli Kris S on the straight.

Following the earlier plan, the next race for the horse was the Tenno Sho (Autumn). His main competition for the day would be Lohengrin and Eishin Preston. At the start, Symboli Kris S was drawn on the disadvantageous outside gate but was still able to start in the mid-pack as usual. Lohengrin and Go Steady dominated the early phase as they stretched the lead by 20 lengths at the first 1000 metres. The two horses eventually slowed down on the later phase as the chasing pack caught up. Then, Symboli Kris S made an unorthodox move for this race as he veered towards the inside track from the outside to unleash his finishing speed that pulled him away. He maintained the lead and won the race and denying the late-charge Tsurumaru Boy, who finished in second place, one and a half lengths behind. This was his third GI win, and it was also the first time in history a horse won the Tenno Sho (Autumn) in back to back years.

In November, Symboli Kris S would race in the Japan Cup for the second time. He was picked as the favourite to win with odds of 1.9 to 1 out of 18 horses competing. Peslier rode him well in the middle pack during the early race. As he reached the third corner of the track, he sped up, accelerating into their approach to the homestretch. However, he was unable to catch the runaway Tap Dance City in the process. Tap Dance City maintained his early lead to win by nine and three quarters lengths ahead of Symboli Kris S, who took third place behind That's The Plenty.

Symboli Kris S's final race of the season was the Arima Kinen. He was the most voted horse this time around, accumulating 125,116 votes. When the race started, That's the Plenty and Active Bio set a fast pace and took an early lead. The middle group began to close in on the two front-runners at the third corner of the second lap. The middle group comprised Lincoln, followed by Symboli Kris S and Zenno Rob Roy, then Win Blaze. Lincoln made a move first by overtaking both of the front-runners. That move was marked by Symboli Kris S who in turned followed and surpassed him on the final 300 metres. Symboli Kris S then widened the gap with Lincoln, holding the other horse at nine lengths to win the Arima Kinen, a race record, repeating his feat from the previous year. For the year of 2003, Symboli Kris S was rated 124 by the International Federation of Horseracing Authorities.

This would be the last race of his career, as his retirement ceremony came shortly after the race ended. His racehorse registration also terminated on the same day. For the JRA Award this year, Symboli Kris S became the Japanese Horse of the Year for the second time in a row with 220 votes out of 287. He also won the JRA Award for Best Older Male Horse with 275 votes.

== Stud career and death ==
Symboli Kris S first stood at the Shadai Stallion Station in Abira, Hokkaido. In 2016, he moved to the Breeders Stallion Station in Hidaka, Hokkaido.

In October 2019, he retired from stud duty and was moved to the Symboli Farm in Narita, Chiba. He was humanely euthanized on December 8, 2020, at the age of 21 after battling laminitis.

=== Notable progeny ===
c = colt, f = filly, g = gelding
bold = G1/Jpn1 stakes

Grade One winners
Foaled	Name	Sex	Major Wins
2005	Success Brocken	c	**Japan Dirt Derby**, **February Stakes**, **Tokyo Daishōten**
2006	Strong Return	c	Keio Hai Spring Cup, **Yasuda Kinen**
2009	Alfredo	c	**Asahi Hai Futurity Stakes**
2010	Epiphaneia	c	Radio Nikkei Hai Nisai Stakes, Kobe Shimbun Hai, **Kikuka-shō**, **Japan Cup**
2015	Le Vent Se Leve	c	**Zen-Nippon Nisai Yushun**, Unicorn Stakes, **Japan Dirt Derby**, **Mile Championship Nambu Hai**, **Champions Cup**

Other winners
Foaled	Name	Sex	Major Wins
2005	Dantsu Kissui	c	Arlington Cup
2005	Machikanenihombare	c	Elm Stakes
2005	Monte Kris S	c	Diamond Stakes
2006	Apres un Reve	c	Aoba Sho
2006	Crit Valent	c	Niigata Jump Stakes
2006	Danon Come On	c	Nagoya Daishoten
2006	Power Struggle	c	Hakusan Daishoten
2006	Renforcer	c	Elm Stakes, Diolite Kinen, Urawa Kinen, Saga Kinen
2006	San Carlo	c	New Zealand Trophy, Hankyu Hai, Hanshin Cup (twice)
2007	Aliseo	c	Spring Stakes, Mainichi Ōkan
2007	Silent Melody	c	March Stakes
2008	Mitra	g	Fukushima Kinen, Kinko Sho
2008	Satono Apollo	g	Chunichi Shimbun Hai
2009	Sanacion	c	Tokyo High-jump, Hanshin Spring Jump
2010	Meiner Fiesta	c	Kyoto Jump Stakes
2010	Solor	c	March Stakes, Kokura Summer Jump
2010	Yule Singing	g	St Lite Kinen, Niigata Daishoten
2011	Air Anthem	c	Hakodate Kinen
2011	Shonan Lagoon	c	Aoba Sho
2013	Satono Titan	c	March Stakes
2014	Sunrise Soar	c	Nagoya Daishoten, Heian Stakes
2017	Cortesia	c	Kisaragi Sho
2017	Pretty Chance	f	Ladies' Prelude

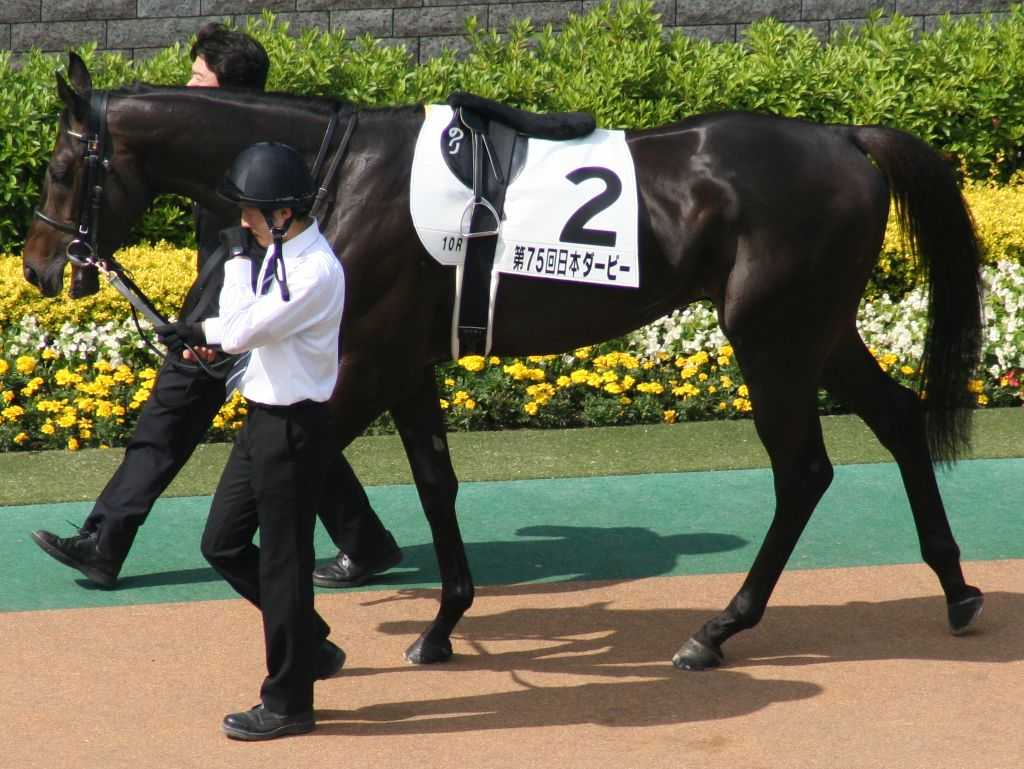
Success Brocken

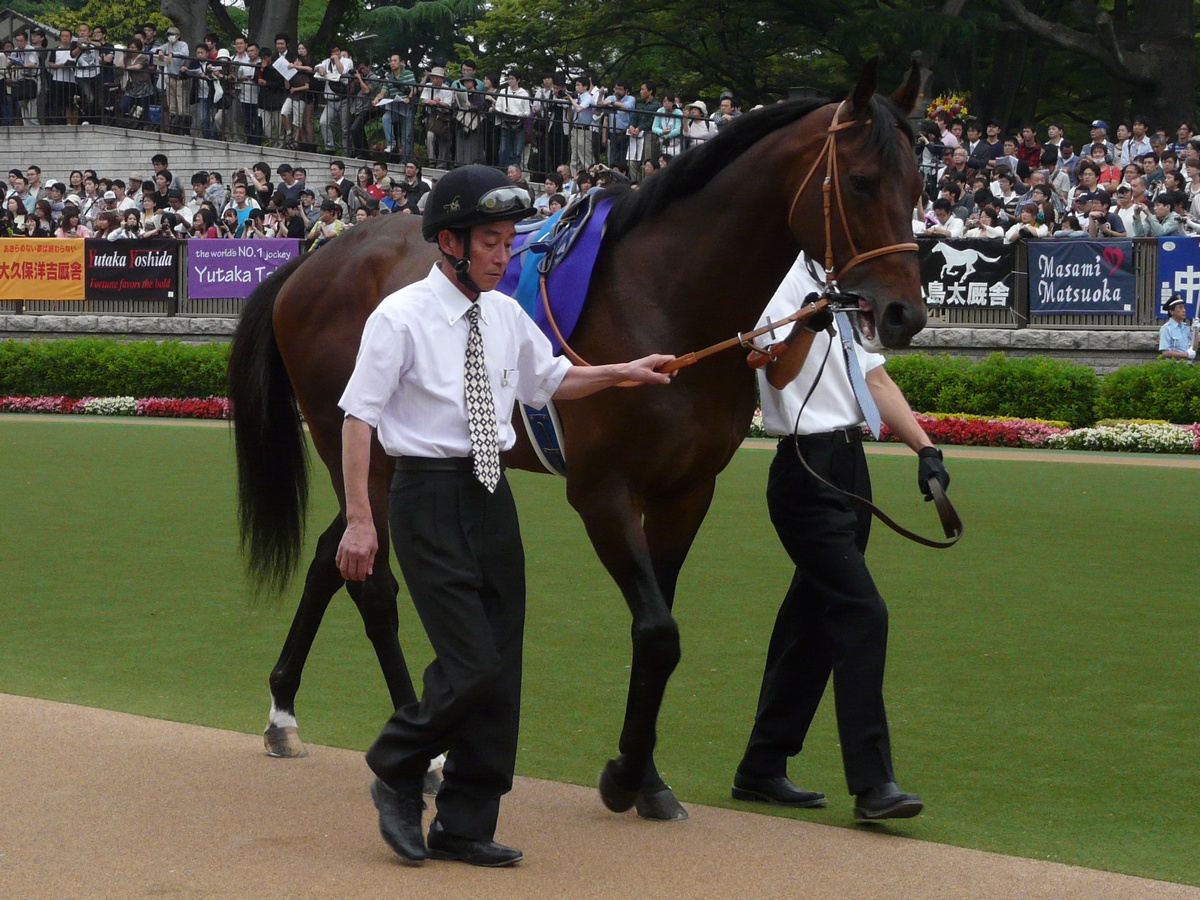
Strong Return

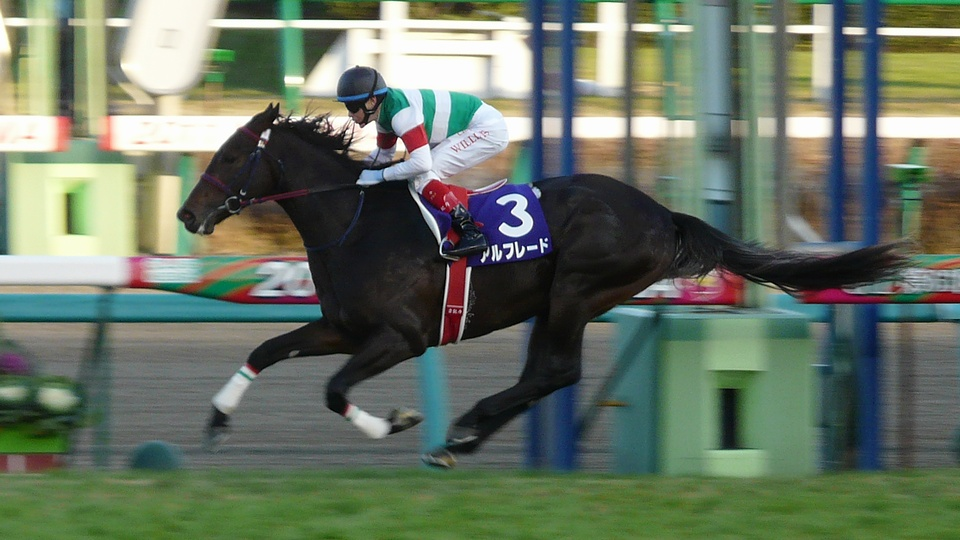
Alfredo

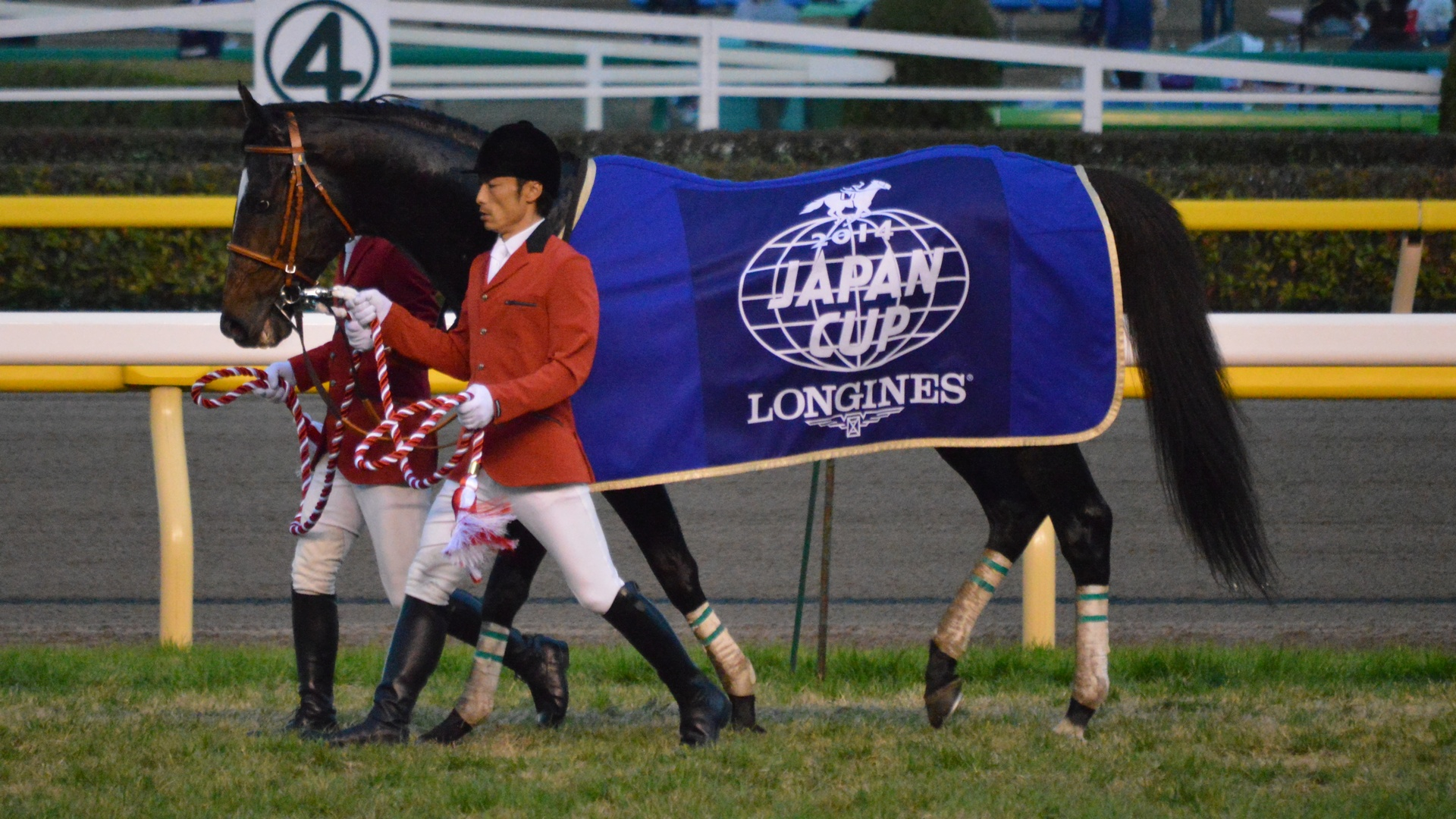
Epiphaneia

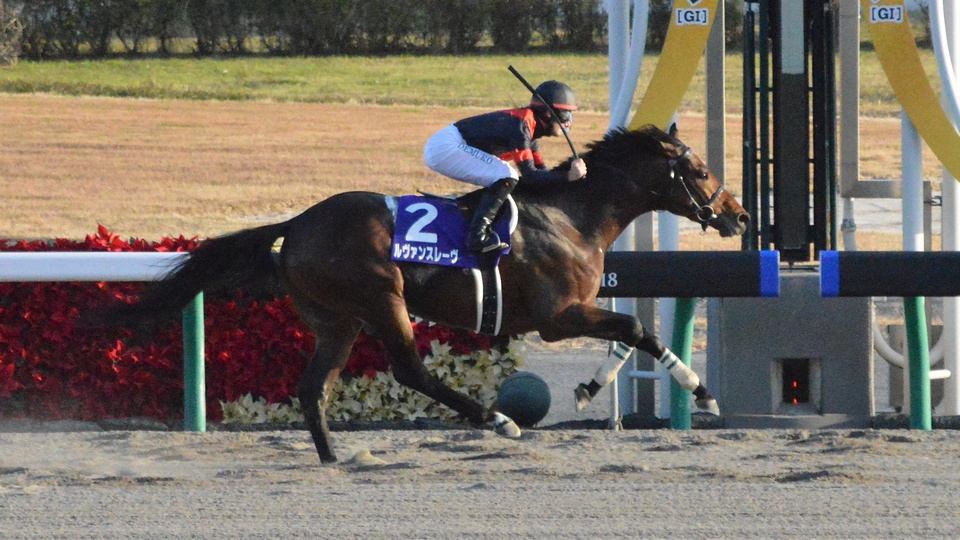
Le Vent Se Leve

Symboli Kris S was also the damsire of Oju Chosan, Rey de Oro, Akai Ito, and Songline.

== In popular culture ==
An anthropomorphized version of Symboli Kris S appears as a character in the Japanese multimedia franchise Umamusume: Pretty Derby, voiced by Meiku Harukawa. She is depicted as an emotionless, quiet young woman who, as a foreign exchange student, often speaks in English. She is dedicated to fulfilling missions with the goal of repaying her debt to the Symboli family, and values peak efficiency and winning as much as possible.

== Racing form ==
Symboli Kris S won eight races and placed on the podium six more times out of 15 races. This data is available based on JBIS and netkeiba.

Date	Age	Racecourse	Race	Grade	Distance (Condition)	Entry	HN	Odds (Favored)	Finish	Time	Margins	Jockey	Winner (Runner-up)
Oct 13, 2001	2	Tokyo	2yo Newcomer		1,600 m (Firm)	9	1	6.5 (4)	1st	1:36.5	–0.1	Yukio Okabe	(Asakusa Kininaru)
Jan 27, 2002	3	Tokyo	Saintpaulia Sho	ALW (1W)	1,800 m (Heavy)	14	14	3.6 (2)	2nd	1:53.3	0.1	Norihiro Yokoyama	Timeless World
Feb 9, 2002	3	Tokyo	Yurikamome Sho	ALW (1W)	2,400 m (Firm)	16	16	1.7 (1)	3rd	2:30.8	0.2	Norihiro Yokoyama	Tokai Arrow
Mar 10, 2002	3	Nakayama	3yo Allowance	1W	1,800 m (Firm)	16	9	1.8 (1)	3rd	1:48.0	0.6	Yukio Okabe	Meiner Liberty
Apr 6, 2002	3	Nakayama	Yamabuki Sho	ALW (1W)	2,200 m (Firm)	16	15	2.8 (2)	1st	2:14.3	–0.3	Yukio Okabe	(Meiner Amundsen)
Apr 27, 2002	3	Tokyo	Aoba Sho	2	2,400 m (Firm)	18	3	2.2 (1)	1st	2:26.5	–0.4	Yutaka Take	(Bamboo Juventus)
May 26, 2002	3	Tokyo	Tokyo Yushun	1	2,400 m (Firm)	18	11	6.2 (3)	2nd	2:26.4	0.2	Yukio Okabe	Tanino Gimlet
Sep 22, 2002	3	Hanshin	Kobe Shimbun Hai	2	2,000 m (Firm)	16	9	2.1 (1)	1st	1:59.1	–0.4	Yukio Okabe	(No Reason)
Oct 27, 2002	3	Nakayama	Tenno Sho (Autumn)	1	2,000 m (Firm)	18	8	6.5 (3)	1st	1:58.5	–0.1	Yukio Okabe	(Narita Top Road)
Nov 24, 2002	3	Nakayama	Japan Cup	1	2,200 m (Firm)	16	7	3.4 (1)	3rd	2:12.3	0.1	Olivier Peslier	Falbrav
Dec 22, 2002	3	Nakayama	Arima Kinen	1	2,500 m (Good)	14	1	3.7 (2)	1st	2:32.6	–0.1	Olivier Peslier	(Tap Dance City)
Jun 29, 2003	4	Hanshin	Takarazuka Kinen	1	2,200 m (Firm)	17	5	2.1 (1)	5th	2:12.3	0.3	Kent Desormeaux	Hishi Miracle
Nov 2, 2003	4	Tokyo	Tenno Sho (Autumn)	1	2,000 m (Firm)	18	18	2.7 (1)	1st	R1:58.0	–0.2	Olivier Peslier	(Tsurumaru Boy)
Nov 30, 2003	4	Tokyo	Japan Cup	1	2,400 m (Soft)	18	5	1.9 (1)	3rd	2:30.3	1.6	Olivier Peslier	Tap Dance City
Dec 28, 2003	4	Nakayama	Arima Kinen	1	2,500 m (Firm)	12	12	2.6 (1)	1st	R2:30.5	–1.5	Olivier Peslier	(Lincoln)

Legend:
Turf

- R indicated that it was a record time finish.

== Pedigree ==
Pedigree of Symboli Kris S, dark bay stallion, 1999
Sire Kris S. (USA) Blk. 1977	Roberto (USA); B. 1969	Hail to Reason	Turn-to
Sire Kris S. (USA) Blk. 1977	Roberto (USA); B. 1969	Hail to Reason	Nothirdchance
Sire Kris S. (USA) Blk. 1977	Roberto (USA); B. 1969	Bramalea	Nashua
Sire Kris S. (USA) Blk. 1977	Roberto (USA); B. 1969	Bramalea	Rarelea
Sire Kris S. (USA) Blk. 1977	Sharp Queen (USA); B. 1969	Princequillo	Prince Rose
Sire Kris S. (USA) Blk. 1977	Sharp Queen (USA); B. 1969	Princequillo	Cosquilla
Sire Kris S. (USA) Blk. 1977	Sharp Queen (USA); B. 1969	Bridgework	Occupy
Sire Kris S. (USA) Blk. 1977	Sharp Queen (USA); B. 1969	Bridgework	Feale Bridge
Dam Tee Kay (USA) Dkb/br. 1991	Gold Meridian (USA); Dkb/br. 1982	Seattle Slew	Bold Reasoning
Dam Tee Kay (USA) Dkb/br. 1991	Gold Meridian (USA); Dkb/br. 1982	Seattle Slew	My Charmer
Dam Tee Kay (USA) Dkb/br. 1991	Gold Meridian (USA); Dkb/br. 1982	Queen Louie	Crimson Satan
Dam Tee Kay (USA) Dkb/br. 1991	Gold Meridian (USA); Dkb/br. 1982	Queen Louie	Reagent
Dam Tee Kay (USA) Dkb/br. 1991	Tri Argo (USA); Dkb/br. 1982	Tri Jet	Jester
Dam Tee Kay (USA) Dkb/br. 1991	Tri Argo (USA); Dkb/br. 1982	Tri Jet	Haze
Dam Tee Kay (USA) Dkb/br. 1991	Tri Argo (USA); Dkb/br. 1982	Hail Proudly	Francis S.
Dam Tee Kay (USA) Dkb/br. 1991	Tri Argo (USA); Dkb/br. 1982	Hail Proudly	Spanglet (F-No. 8-h)

== See also ==
- List of leading Thoroughbred racehorses
