= Kazuo Fujisawa =

Japanese racehorse trainer (born 1951)

Kazuo Fujisawa 藤澤 和雄
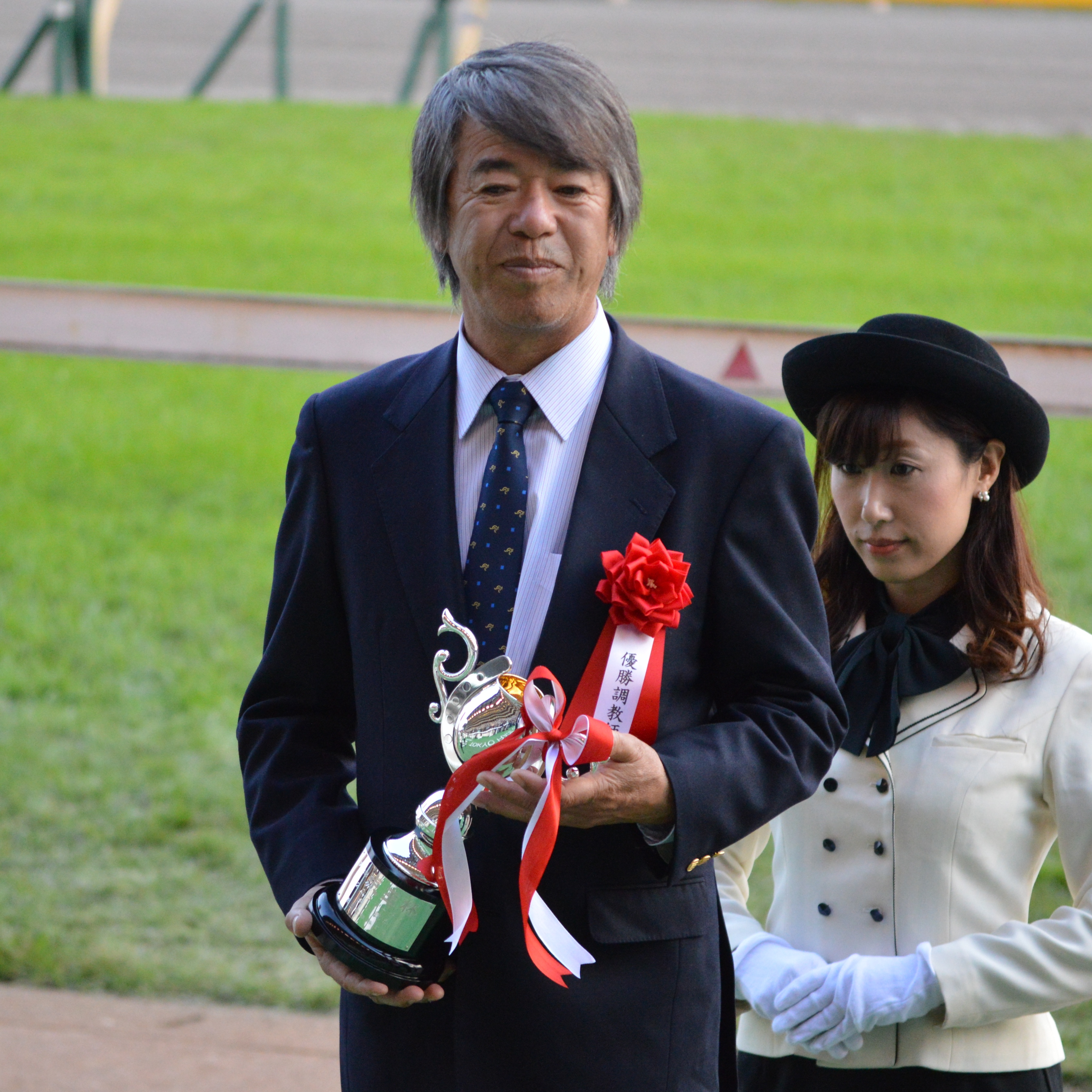
- Kazuo Fujisawa at the awards ceremony of the 2017 Keio Hai Nisai Stakes

Personal information
- Nationality: Japanese
- Born: 22 September 1951 (age 75) Tomakomai, Hokkaido, Japan
- Occupation: Trainer (Retired)

Horse racing career
- Sport: Horse racing
- Career wins: 1570

Racing awards
- JRA Award for Best Trainer (races won) (1993, 1995–2000, 2007, 2009); JRA Award for Best Trainer (winning average) (1991, 1996, 1997, 1999, 2001, 2003, 2004); JRA Award for Best Trainer (money earned) (1995–1998, 2001–2004); JRA Award for Best trainer (training technique) (1993, 1995–2000, 2002, 2005); JRA Special Award (2020)

Honors
- Japan Racing Association Hall of Fame (2022)

Significant horses
- Taiki Shuttle, Bubble Gum Fellow, Symboli Kris S, Zenno Rob Roy, Rey de Oro, Soul Stirring, Gran Alegria

Kazuo Fujisawa (藤澤 和雄, Fujisawa Kazuo) (born September 22, 1951, in Tomakomai, Hokkaido, Japan) is a retired trainer of Thoroughbred race horses. He had been a licensed trainer in Japan since 1987 and from 1993 until his retirement in 2022 has won the training title eleven times.

Three of the horses he trained were voted Japanese Horse of the Year on four occasions: Taiki Shuttle (1998), Symboli Kris S (2002, 2003) and Zenno Rob Roy (2004). Fujisawa was also the trainer of Casino Drive, who won the 2008 Peter Pan Stakes at Belmont Park in New York.

Fujisawa retired from horse training on February 28, 2022 as he had reached the age of retirement, with his stable winning the 1,570th race on the day of his retirement. The horses that belonged to the Fujisawa stable at the time were transferred to Masayoshi Ebina's newly created stable.

== Major wins ==
France

- Prix Jacques le Marois - (1) - Taiki Shuttle (1998)

Japan

- Arima Kinen - (3) - Symboli Kris S (2002 & 2003), Zenno Rob Roy (2004)
- Asahi Hai Futurity Stakes - (2) - Bubble Gum Fellow (1995), Satono Ares (2016)
- Hanshin Sansai Himba Stakes - (2) - Stinger (1998), Soul Stirring (2016)
- Japan Cup - (1) - Zenno Rob Roy (2004)
- Mile Championship - (6) - Shinko Lovely (1993), Taiki Shuttle (1997 & 1998), Zenno El Cid (2001), Gran Alegria (2020 & 2021)
- NHK Mile Cup - (1) - Symboli Indy (1999)
- Oka Sho - (2) - Dance in the Mood (2004), Gran Alegria (2019)
- Sprinters Stakes - (2) - Taiki Shuttle (1997), Gran Alegria (2020)
- Takamatsunomiya Hai - (1) - Shinko King (1997)
- Tenno Sho (Autumn) - (5) - Bubble Gum Fellow (1996), Symboli Kris S (2002 & 2003), Zenno Rob Roy (2004), Spielberg (2014)
- Tokyo Yūshun (Japanese Derby) - (1) - Rey de Oro (2017)
- Victoria Mile - (2) - Dance in the Mood (2006), Gran Alegria (2021)
- Yasuda Kinen - (3) - Taiki Blizzard (1997), Taiki Shuttle (1998), Gran Alegria (2020)
- Yushun Himba (Japanese Oaks) - (1) - Soul Stirring (2017)
