= Mainichi Ōkan =

Mainichi Ōkan 毎日王冠
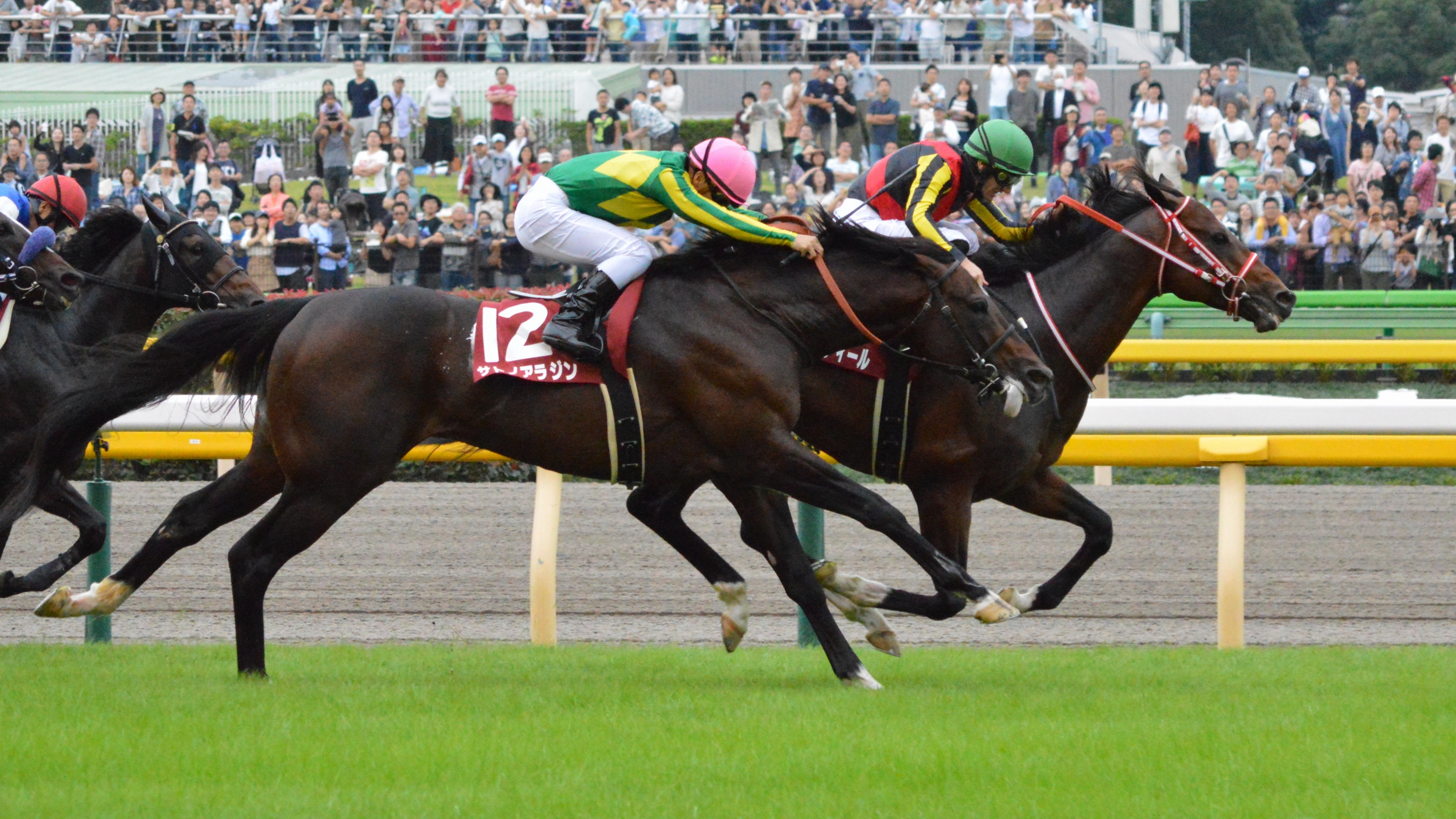
- 2017 Mainichi Okan
- Class: Grade 2
- Location: Tokyo Racecourse, Fuchū
- Inaugurated: 1950
- Race type: Thoroughbred Flat racing

Race information
- Distance: 1800 metres
- Surface: Turf
- Track: Left-handed
- Qualification: 3-y-o +, Colts & Fillies
- Weight: Special Weight
- Purse: ¥ 145,220,000 (as of 2025): 1st: ¥ 67,000,000; 2nd: ¥ 27,000,000; 3rd: ¥ 17,000,000

The Mainichi Ōkan (毎日王冠, mainichi ōkan) is a Grade 2 horse race in Japan for Thoroughbred colts and fillies aged three and over, run over a distance of 1,800 metres at Tokyo Racecourse.

The race is run in October and serves as a trial race for the autumn edition of the Tenno Sho.

It was first run in 1950 over 2500 metres. The distance was reduced to 2300 metres in 1959 and to 2000 metres in 1962 before the race was run over its current distance for the first time in 1984. It has been rated JRA Grade II since that year and was promoted to International Grade II in 2001. Since 2014, the race serves as a trial race for the Autumn Tenno Sho.

Among the winners of the race have been Katsuragi Ace, Oguri Cap, Bubble Gum Fellow, Silence Suzuka, Grass Wonder, Eishin Preston, Daiwa Major and A Shin Hikari

== Weight ==
55 kg for three-year-olds, 57 kg for four-year-olds and above.

Allowances:

- 2 kg for fillies / mares
- 2 kg for southern hemisphere bred three-year-olds

Penalties (excluding two-year-old race performance):

- If a graded stakes race has been won within a year:
  - 2 kg for a grade 1 win (1 kg for fillies / mares)
  - 1 kg for a grade 2 win
- If a graded stakes race has been won for more than a year:
  - 1 kg for a grade 1 win

== Records ==
Speed record:

- 1:44.1 Salios 2022

Most successful horse (2 wins):

- Oguri Cap – 1988, 1989
- Salios - 2020, 2022

== Winners since 1994 ==
Year	Winner	Age	Jockey	Trainer	Owner	Time
1994	Nehai Caesar	4	Katsumi Shiomura	Tadashi Fuse	Daimaru Kigyo	1:44.6
1995	Sugano Oji	4	Tomio Yasuda	Hiroyuki Uehara	Motohide Sugawara	1:48.4
1996	Annus Mirabilis	4	Darryll Holland	Saeed bin Suroor	Godolphin	1:45.8
1997	Bubble Gum Fellow	4	Yukio Okabe	Kazuo Fujisawa	Shadai Race Horse	1:46.1
1998	Silence Suzuka	4	Yutaka Take	Mituru Hashida	Keiji Nagai	1:44.9
1999	Grass Wonder	4	Hitoshi Matoba	Mitsuhiro Ogata	Hanzawa	1:45.8
2000	Tunante	5	Hideaki Miyuki	Shoichi Matsumoto	Shadai Race Horse	1:46.1
2001	Eishin Preston	4	Yuichi Fukunaga	Shuji Kitahashi	Toyomitsu Hirai	1:45.3
2002	Magnaten	6	Yukio Okabe	Kazuo Fujisawa	Takao Komai	1:46.1
2003	Balance of Game	4	Katsuharu Tanaka	Yoshitada Munakata	Hiroyuki Sonobe	1:45.7
2004	Telegnosis	5	Masaki Katsuura	Hiroaki Sugiura	Shadai Race Horse	1:46.0
2005	Sunrise Pegasus	7	Hiroshi Goto	Sei Ishizaka	Takao Matsuoka	1:46.5
2006	Daiwa Major	5	Katsumi Ando	Hiroyuki Uehara	Keizo Oshiro	1:45.5
2007	Chosan	5	Masami Matsuoka	Toshiaki Shimizu	Naoyoshi Nagayama	1:44.2
2008	Super Hornet	5	Yusuke Fujioka	Yoshito Yahagi	Tokuo Morimoto	1:44.6
2009	Company	8	Norihiro Yokoyama	Hideuki Otonashi	Hideko Kondo	1:45.3
2010	Aliseo	3	Yuichi Fukunaga	Noriyuki Hori	Shadai Race Horse	1:46.4
2011	Dark Shadow	4	Yuichi Fukunaga	Noriyuki Hori	Tomokazu Iida	1:46.7
2012	Curren Black Hill	3	Shinichiro Akiyama	Osamu Hirata	Takashi Suzuki	1:45.0
2013	Eishin Flash	6	Yuichi Fukunaga	Hideaki Fujiwara	Katsuhiko Hirai	1:46.7
2014	Air Saumur	5	Yutaka Take	Katsuhiko Sumii	Lucky Field	1:45.2
2015	A Shin Hikari	4	Yutaka Take	Masanori Sakaguchi	Eishindo	1:45.6
2016	Rouge Buck	4	Keita Tosaki	Masahiro Otake	Carrot Farm	1:46.6
2017	Real Steel	5	Mirco Demuro	Yoshito Yahagi	Sunday Racing	1:45.6
2018	Aerolithe	4	João Moreira	Takanori Kikuzawa	Sunday Racing	1:44.5
2019	Danon Kingly	3	Keita Tosaki	Kiyoshi Hagiwara	Danox	1:44.4
2020	Salios	3	Christophe Lemaire	Noriyuki Hori	Silk Racing	1:45.5
2021	Schnell Meister	3	Christophe Lemaire	Takahisa Tezuka	Sunday Racing	1:44.8
2022	Salios	5	Kohei Matsuyama	Noriyuki Hori	Silk Racing	1:44.1
2023	Elton Barows	3	Atsuya Nishimura	Haruki Sugiyama	Koji Inokuma	1:45.3
2024	Sixpence	3	Christophe Lemaire	Sakae Kunieda	Carrot Farm	1:45.1
2025	Lebensstil	5	Akihide Tsumura	Hiroyasu Tanaka	Carrot Farm	1:44.0
2026	Seiun Hades	7	Hideaki Miyuki	Shinsuke Hashiguchi	Shigeyuki Nishiyama	1:45.5

== Earlier winners ==
- 1950 – Hatakaze
- 1952 – Mitsuhata
- 1952 – New Moana
- 1953 – Track O
- 1954 – Hakuryo
- 1955 – Susquehanna
- 1956 – Fair Manna
- 1957 – Haku Chikara
- 1958 – Hishi Maaru
- 1959 – Kuripero
- 1960 – Unebi Hikari
- 1961 – Harrow More
- 1962 – Emroan
- 1963 – Yamano O
- 1964 – Toast
- 1965 – Umeno Chikara
- 1966 – Theftway
- 1967 – Tama Queen
- 1968 – Shesky
- 1969 – Takeshiba O
- 1970 – Kurishiba
- 1971 – Tokino Shin O
- 1972 – Hustler
- 1973 – Takuma O
- 1974 – Takekuma Hikaru
- 1975 – White Fontaine
- 1976 – Harbor Young
- 1977 – C B Queen
- 1978 – Press Toko
- 1979 – C B Cross
- 1980 – Kane Minobu
- 1981 – Juji Arrow
- 1982 – Kyoei Promise
- 1983 – Takara Tenryu
- 1984 – Katsuragi Ace
- 1985 – Gold Way
- 1986 – Sakura Yutaka O
- 1987 – Dyna Actress
- 1988 – Oguri Cap
- 1989 – Oguri Cap
- 1990 – Lucky Guerlain
- 1991 – Prekrasnie
- 1992 – Daitaku Helios
- 1993 – Shinko Lovely

== See also ==
- Horse racing in Japan
- List of Japanese flat horse races
