= Stayer =

A stayer is a horse that may be a better horse racing performer over a longer distance, such as more than 3/2 miles (2.4 km). Sometimes, the term may also refer to a horse that is not able to quicken or speed up.
