= Tennō Shō =

Horse races held in Japan

The Tennō Shō (天皇賞; lit. 'Emperor Prize') refers to two horse races held yearly in Japan, once in the spring at Kyoto Racecourse over a distance of 3,200 metres in late April or early May, and once in the autumn at Tokyo Racecourse over a distance of 2,000 metres in late October or early November, originally same 3,200 metres as spring race until 1983.

Tennō refers to the Emperor of Japan. The races are both International Grade I races. Prior to the 2007 races, both Tennō Shō races were Japanese domestic Grade 1 races.

== History ==
One of the origin of the Tennō Shō is The Emperor's Cup first contested at Negishi Racecourse in 1905, prized from the Emperor for the winner, and later renamed as Teishitsu Goshōten until 1937. Another origin is Yushō Naikokusanba Rengō Kyōsō run over 3,200 metres, held twice a year between 1911 and 1937 to determine the best horse of the year. The Tennō Shō was established in 1937 to unify these prestigious races under the name of the Emperor, and therefore it is regarded as the most prestigious horse race in Japan since then.

Prior to 1980, a horse winning a Tennō Shō race was not allowed to participate in future editions of the race again, but this ban was lifted in 1981.

In 1984, the Japan Racing Association introduced Group races into their big races, and Tennō Shō is placed as Grade 1 (domestic grade at that time). At the same time the distance of the Tennō Shō (Autumn) held at Tokyo Racecourse was shortened from 3,200 metres to 2,000 metres, while the Tennō Shō (Spring) held at Kyoto Racecourse remained its distance as 3,200 metres, thus the Tennō Shō (Spring) remained its characteristics to determine best stayer, while Tennō Shō (Autumn) changed its characteristics to determine best middle-distance horse.

Only two horses won the prize three times:

- Kitasan Black (2016 Spring, 2017 Spring and Autumn)
- T. M. Opera O (2000 Spring and Autumn, 2001 Spring)

Apart from Kitasan Black and T. M. Opera O, four horses to date have won consecutive runnings, either by winning both the Spring and Autumn races in the same year or by winning the Autumn race, and following year's Spring race.

- Tamamo Cross (1988 Spring, Autumn)
- Super Creek (1989 Autumn, 1990 Spring)
- Special Week (1999 Spring, Autumn)
- Meisho Samson (2007 Spring and Autumn)

Seven horses have won two non-consecutive runnings.

- Mejiro McQueen (1991, 1992 Spring, finished 1st in 1991 Autumn but demoted to last)
- Rice Shower (1993, 1995 Spring)
- Symboli Kris S (2002, 2003 Autumn)
- Fenomeno (2013, 2014 Spring)
- Fierement (2019, 2020 Spring)
- Almond Eye (2019, 2020 Autumn)
- Equinox (2022, 2023 Autumn)

== See also ==
- Horse racing in Japan
- List of Japanese flat horse races
- Tennō Shō (Spring)
- Tennō Shō (Autumn)
