= Straight Girl =

Japanese-bred Thoroughbred racehorse

Straight Girl ストレイトガール
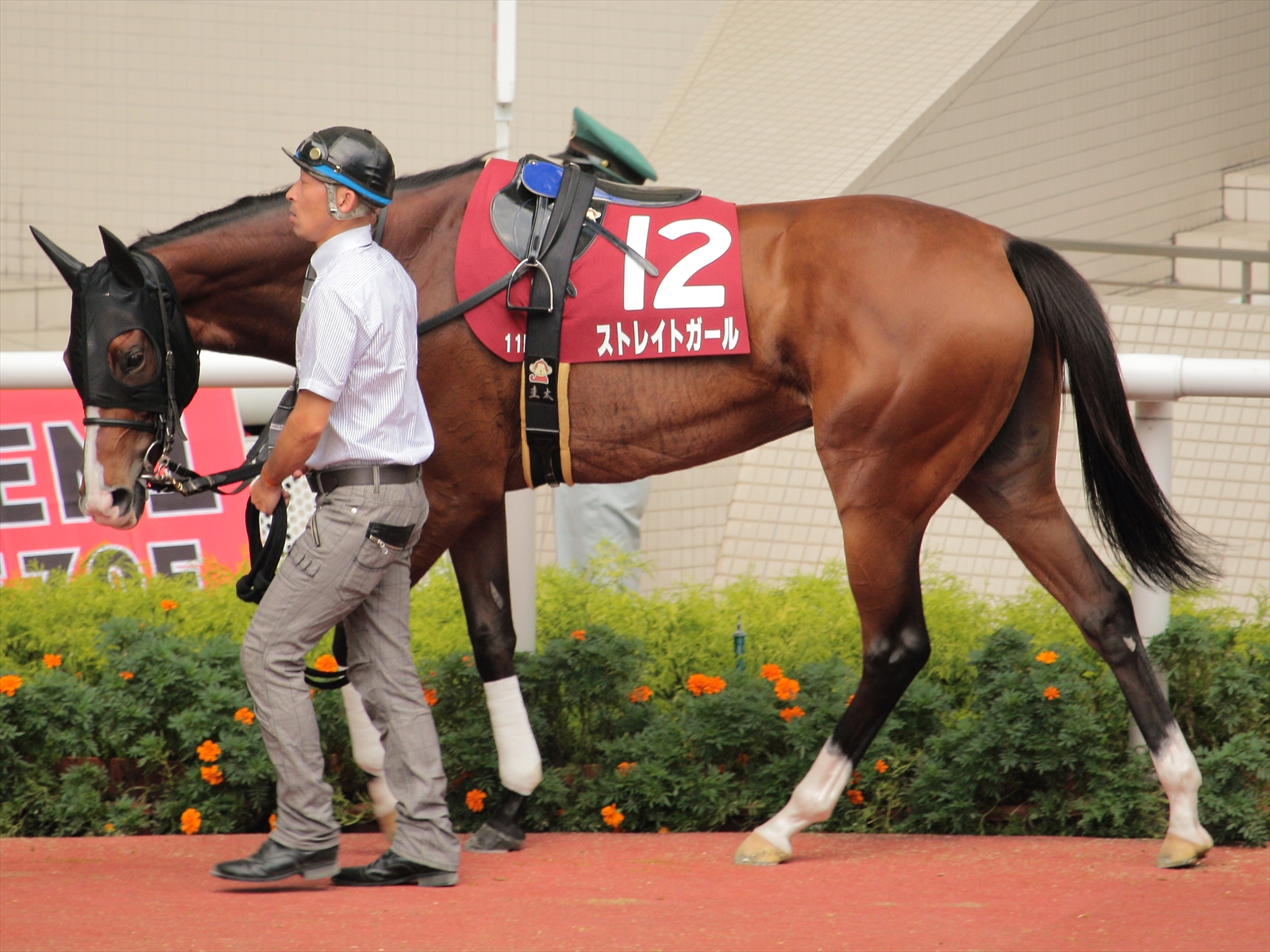
- Straight Girl in 2015
- Breed: Thoroughbred
- Sire: Fuji Kiseki
- Grandsire: Sunday Silence
- Dam: Never Period
- Damsire: Taiki Shuttle
- Sex: Mare
- Foaled: 12 March 2009
- Died: 28 May 2026 (aged 17)
- Country: Japan
- Colour: Bay
- Breeder: Okamoto Bokujo/ TH Co Ltd
- Owner: Toshihiro Hirosaki
- Racing colours
- Trainer: Hideaki Fujiwara
- Jockey: Keita Tosaki; Yasunari Iwata
- Record: 31: 11-4-3
- Earnings: 545,424,000 JPY

Major wins
- Silk Road Stakes (2014); Victoria Mile (2015, 2016); Sprinters Stakes (2015)

Straight Girl (Japanese: ストレイトガール, Hepburn: Sutoreito Gāru; 12 March 2009 - 28 May 2026) was a Japanese Thoroughbred racehorse and broodmare. She showed modest ability in her early career, competing mainly in minor sprint races before winning the Listed Owari Stakes on her final run as a four-year-old in 2013. In the following year, she won the Grade 3 Silk Road Stakes and was placed in the Takamatsunomiya Kinen, Victoria Mile, Sprinters Stakes and Hong Kong Sprint. She appeared to reach her peak as a six-year-old in 2015 when she won both the Victoria Mile and the Sprinters Stakes. The mare was kept in training for two races as a seven-year-old and produced arguably her best performance on her final appearance when she won the Victoria Mile for a second time.

== Background ==
Straight Girl was a bay mare with a large white star, a partial white blaze on the lower part of her face and muzzle and white socks on her hind legs. She was bred at the Okamoto Ranch by her owner, Toshihiro Hirosaki's TH Co Ltd. During her racing career she was trained by Toshihiro Hirosaki.

Her sire Fuji Kiseki became the first major winner sired by Sunday Silence when he won the Asahi Hai Futurity Stakes in 1994. As a breeding stallion his other progeny included Isla Bonita, Kane Hekili and Sun Classique (Dubai Sheema Classic). Straight Girl's dam Never Period showed some racing ability, winning three of her twelve starts. She was descended from the imported British mare Lavatera, who was in turn a descendant of the influential broodmare Friar's Daughter.

== Racing career ==
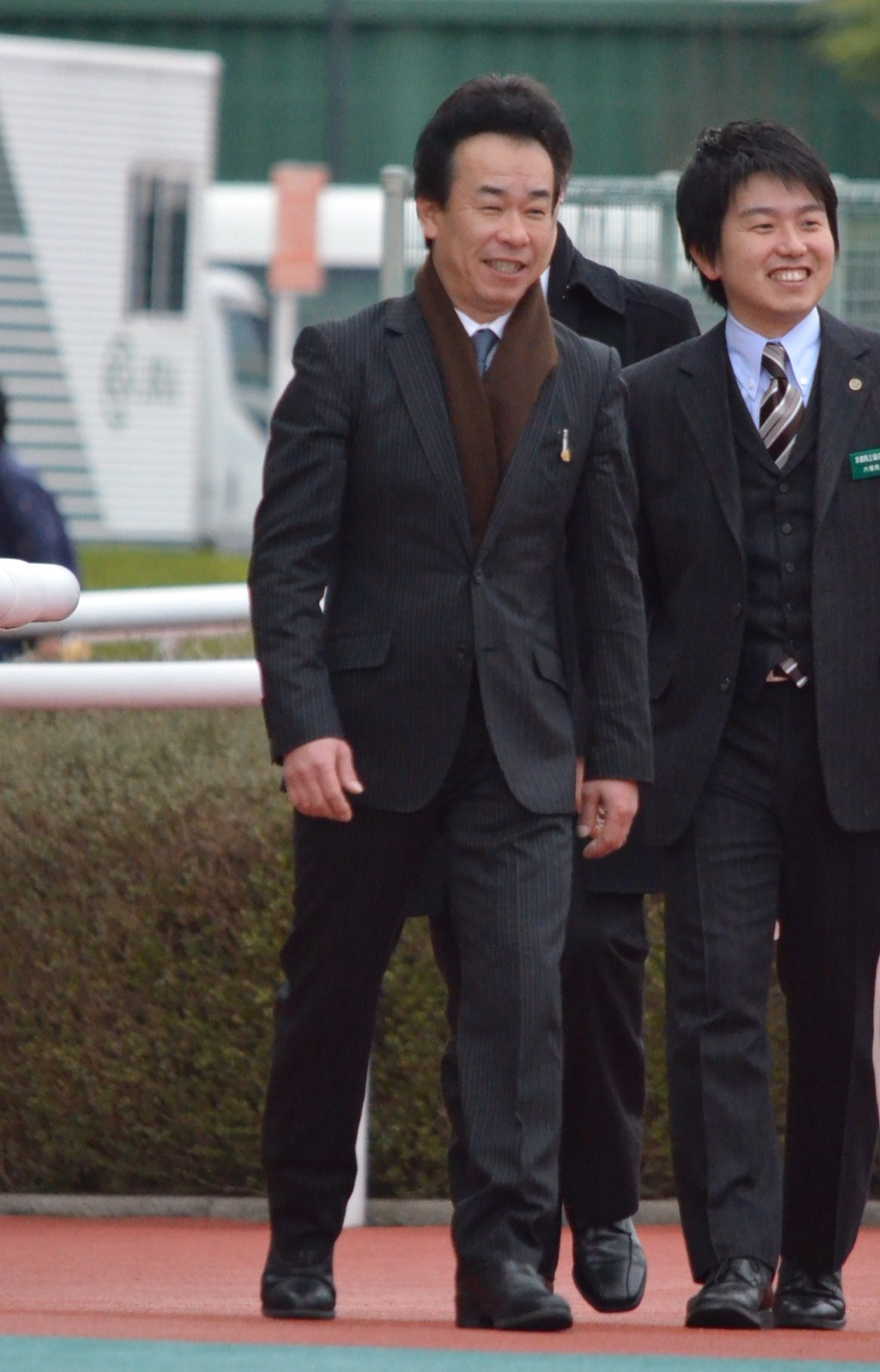
Hideaki Fujiwara, who trained Straight Girl throughout her racing career

=== 2011 & 2012: two and three-year-old seasons ===
Straight Girl began her racing career with four races at Sapporo Racecourse in the late summer and autumn of 2011. After finishing unplaced on her debut on 21 August she recorded her first success in a maiden race over 1200 metres six days later. She was beaten in her next two races before moving to Hanshin Racecourse where she finished seventh in a minor event on 10 December.

In 2012, Straight Girl finished unplaced in two starts at Kyoto Racecourse early in the year and then returned from a four-month break to win a minor event over 1200 metres at Hakodate Racecourse in June. She was beaten in her next two races before running second in a minor race at Sapporo on 1 September in what proved to be her final run of the year.

=== 2013: four-year-old season ===
After being off the track for nine months Straight Girl returned to the track and finished second to Yulefest in a minor race at Hakodate on 16 June. She then began to make rapid progress and won four races in succession, all over 1200 metres at Hakodate: she won a minor race on 23 June, the Sponichi Sho on 13 July, the Nikkan Spots Hai on 20 July and the UHB Sho on 11 August. She was then moved up in class for the Grade 3 Keeneland Cup on 25 August, but was narrowly beaten into second place by the five-year-old mare Forever Mark. On her final run of the year, she recorded her first major success when he won the Listed Owari Stakes over 1200 metres at Chukyo Racecourse on 8 December.

=== 2014: five-year-old season ===
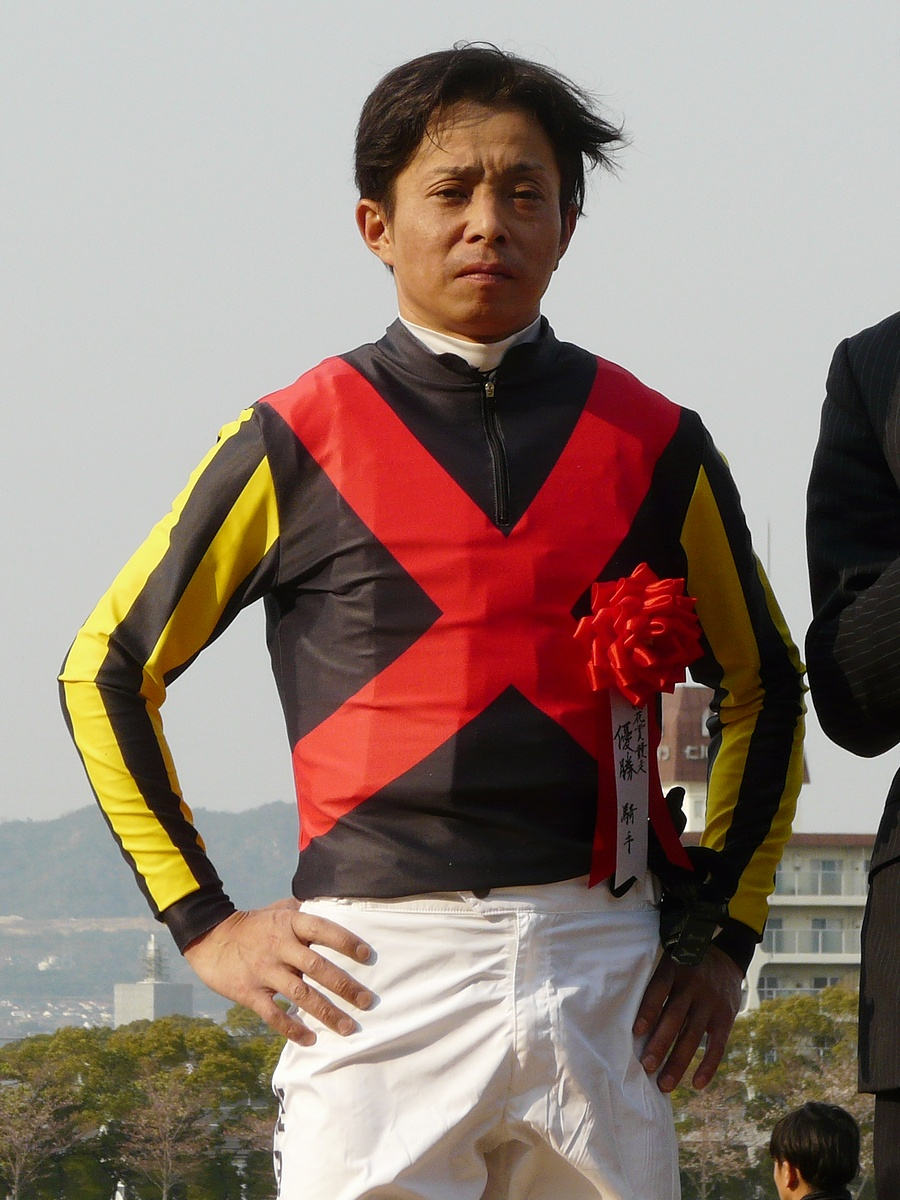
Yasunari Iwata, who rode Straight Girl in 2014

In 2014, Straight Girl was ridden in all of her races by Yasunari Iwata. She began her campaign in the Grade 3 Silk Road Stakes on 2 February at Kyoto, in which started at odds of 4.2/1 and won by two and a half lengths from the favourite Lady of Opera. She failed to win again that year but established herself as a high class performer as she put up several excellent efforts in defeat. In March she was stepped up to Grade 1 level for the first time for the Takamatsunomiya Kinen over 1200 metres at Chukyo and finished third of the eighteen runners behind Copano Richard and Snow Dragon. Having spent most of her career running in sprint races the mare was moved up in distance for the Victoria Mile at Tokyo Racecourse in May. In a closely contested finish she came home third behind Verxina and Meisho Mambo beaten just over half a length by the winner. In June she was dropped in class and started odds-on favourite for the Grade 3 Hakodate but produced her only poor run of the season as she finished eighth.

After the summer break, Straight Girl returned in the Sprinters Stakes run that year at Niigata Racecourse on 5 October. She came home second to the 46/1 outsider Snow Dragon in a "blanket finish" which saw sixteen horses covered by less than four and a half lengths. On her final run of the year the mare was matched against international competition in the Hong Kong Sprint at Sha Tin Racecourse in December. Starting at odds of 16/1 she produced a strong late run to take third place behind the locally trained geldings Aerovelocity and Peniaphobia. The horses finishing behind included Gordon Lord Byron, Buffering, Sole Power, Snow Dragon and Lucky Nine.

=== 2015: six-year-old season ===
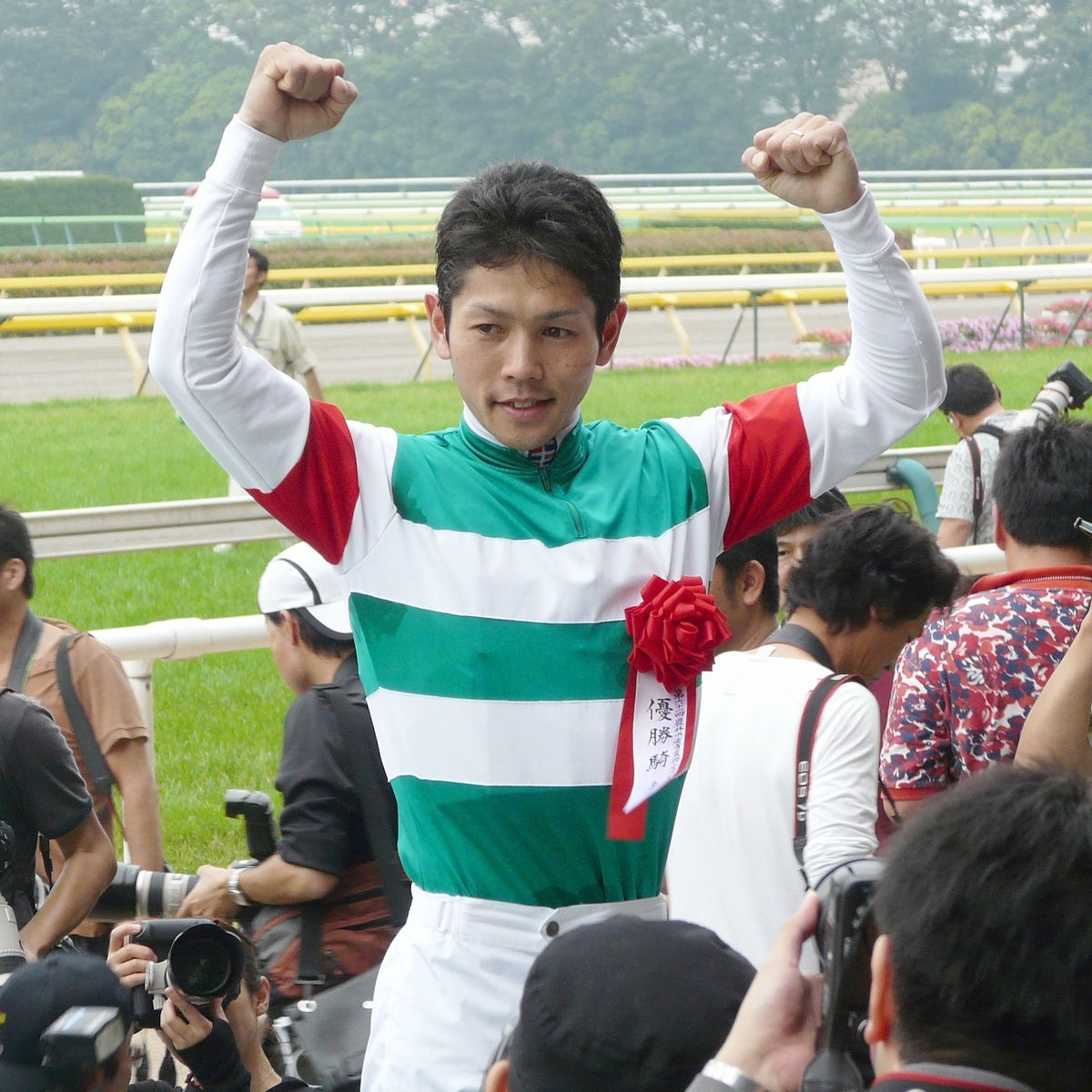
Keita Tosaki, who rode Straight Girl in 2015 and 2016

On her 2015 debut, Straight Girl started favourite for her second attempt at the Takamatsunomiya Kinen on 29 March but finished unplaced behind Aerovelocity. After this race Keita Tosaki took over as the mare's regular jockey and rode her in all of her remaining races. As in 2016, the mare then stepped up in trip to tackle the Victoria Mile and started at odds of 13.1/1 in a field of eighteen fillies and mares at Tokyo on 17 May. The 2014 Yushun Himba winner Nuovo Record started favourite while the other runners included Shonan Pandora, Meisho Mambo and Red Reveur (Hanshin Juvenile Fillies). Straight Girl was settled in fifth place as the 290/1 outsider Minaret set the pace from her fellow long-shot Kaiei Elegant. In the straight she made a sustained run on the outside, overtook the two outsiders in the final strides and won by a neck and one and three quarter lengths from Kaiei Elegant and Minaret. After the race Tosaki said "She broke really well today. I thought that the pace would be somewhat fast and that she will stretch well if I can save her energy until the right moment. The frontrunners were holding off well in the straight but the mare showed a magnificent turn of foot. I rode her for the first time today but she was easy to ride and ran a strong race".

After a summer break, Straight Girl returned in the Grade 2 Centaur Stakes over 1200 metres at Hanshin in September in which she finished fourth behind Active Minoru, Uliuli and Barbara, beaten less than half a length by the winner. The Sprinters Stakes returned to its usual venue at Nakayama on 4 October 2015 and Straight Girl was made the 3.4/1 favourite. Her fourteen opponents included Active Minoru, Uliuli, Copano Richard, Hakusan Moon (2014 Centaur Stakes), Mikki Isle (NHK Mile Cup), and Rich Tapestry (Santa Anita Sprint Championship). Straight Girl tracked the leaders before launching a strong run in the last 200 metres and won by three quarters of a length from Sakura Gospel. Following the race Hideaki Fujiwara commented "I owe it to the owner who has been so understanding as to let me keep her in training towards this long-awaited goal, and the stable staff that had put in every effort to make this happen. She's such a special mare to be able to keep turning in such consistent results throughout her career and to win a sprint G1 at six years old", before suggesting that the mare would be retired at the end of the year. In December the mare made her second attempt to win the Hong Kong Sprint but was unable to reproduce her performance of 2014 and finished ninth behind Peniaphobia.

=== 2016: seven-year-old season ===
Despite expectations that she would be retired to become a broodmare, Straight Girl returned to the track in 2016. She made little impact on her seasonal debut as she finished ninth behind Smart Layer in the Grade 2 Hanshin Himba Stakes over 1600 metres on 9 April. Five weeks after her run at Hanshin, the seven-year-old mare attempted to win a second Victoria Mile and started a 16.7/1 outsider. Mikki Queen (Yushun Himba, Shuka Sho) started favourite in an eighteen-runner field which also included Shonan Pandora, Meisho Mambo, Uliuli, Red Reveur, Let's Go Donki (Oka Sho), Shonan Adela (Hanshin Juvenile Fillies), Smart Layer, Rouge Buck and Queens Ring. Tosaki settled the mare in fourth place before moving up on the inside to take the lead soon after the final turn. Straight Girl broke clear of her rivals in the closing stages and came home two and a half lengths in front of Mikki Queen, with Shonan Pandora a nose away in third place. The winning time of 1:31.5 was a new record for the race. Tosaki commented "Her response was terrific and we were very fortunate to find a clear path open right in front of us in the homestretch. I felt I didn’t have to use my whip, but with top G1 competition chasing us, I drove her to the finish line just in case".

== Racing form ==
Straight Girl had won 11 races with another seven podium finishes out of 31 starts. The data available is based on JBIS, netkeiba and HKJC.

Date	Track	Race	Grade	Distance (Condition)	Entry	HN	Odds (Favored)	Finish	Time	Margins	Jockey	Winner (Runner-up)
2011 – two-year-old season
Aug 21	Sapporo	2yo Newcomer		1,500 m (Firm)	14	5	40.5 (10)	11th	1:32.8	1.5	Hokuto Miyazaki	La Scintillante
Aug 27	Sapporo	2yo Maiden		1,200 m (Firm)	10	5	21.5 (6)	1st	1:10.9	–0.2	Hokuto Miyazaki	(Dear Salute)
Sep 17	Sapporo	2yo Allowance	1W	1,200 m (Firm)	16	2	20.8 (8)	7th	1:11.4	0.9	Hokuto Miyazaki	Sudden Storm
Oct 2	Sapporo	Suzuran Sho	ALW (1W)	1,200 m (Firm)	16	16	99.0 (14)	4th	1:11.3	0.4	Hokuto Miyazaki	Arafune
Dec 10	Hanshin	2yo Allowance	1W	1,400 m (Firm)	14	4	19.0 (7)	4th	1:23.3	0.5	Yuga Kawada	Ninja
2012 – three-year-old season
Jan 15	Kyoto	Kobai Stakes	OP	1,400 m (Firm)	13	13	98.7 (11)	8th	1:23.3	0.6	Suguru Hamanaka	Sound of Heart
Feb 4	Kyoto	Elfin Stakes	OP	1,600 m (Firm)	11	4	63.9 (11)	6th	1:37.3	0.4	Koshiro Take	Sunshine
Jun 17	Hakodate	3yo Allowance	1W	1,200 m (Firm)	15	2	4.1 (2)	1st	1:10.3	–0.1	Yasunari Iwata	(Nike Trick)
Jul 8	Hakodate	Doshin Sports Hai	ALW (2W)	1,200 m (Firm)	16	12	11.3 (6)	5th	1:09.2	0.5	Kosei Miura	Supreme Gift
Jul 29	Sapporo	Hitsujigaoka Tokubetsu	ALW (2W)	1,200 m (Firm)	16	8	5.5 (3)	6th	1:09.0	0.4	Kosei Miura	Nishino B Quick
Sep 1	Sapporo	Mashuko Tokubetsu	ALW (2W)	1,500 m (Firm)	14	13	13.8 (6)	2nd	1:29.4	0.4	Yasunari Iwata	Dantsu Mutant
2013 – four-year-old season
Jun 16	Hakodate	3yo+ Allowance	1W	1,200 m (Firm)	16	16	2.2 (1)	2nd	1:08.1	0.0	Yasunari Iwata	Yulefest
Jun 23	Hakodate	3yo+ Allowance	1W	1,200 m (Firm)	16	16	2.0 (1)	1st	1:08.4	–0.4	Katsuharu Tanaka	(Moere Fleur)
Jul 13	Hakodate	Hakodate Sponichi Sho	ALW (2W)	1,200 m (Firm)	9	1	1.7 (1)	1st	1:09.3	–0.1	Yasunari Iwata	(Yulefest)
Jul 20	Hakodate	Hakodate Nikkan Sports Hai	ALW (3W)	1,200 m (Firm)	15	10	4.5 (2)	1st	1:08.1	–0.3	Yasunari Iwata	(At Will)
Aug 11	Hakodate	UHB Sho	OP	1,200 m (Firm)	12	1	3.1 (2)	1st	1:10.4	0.0	Hayato Yoshida	(Fine Choice)
Aug 25	Hakodate	Keeneland Cup	3	1,200 m (Good)	16	11	3.7 (1)	2nd	1:11.7	0.0	Katsuharu Tanaka	Forever Mark
Dec 8	Chukyo	Owari Stakes	OP	1,200 m (Firm)	18	15	2.9 (1)	1st	1:08.6	–0.2	Hayato Yoshida	(Mogumogu Pakupaku)
2014 – five-year-old season
Feb 2	Kyoto	Silk Road Stakes	3	1,200 m (Firm)	16	2	5.2 (1)	1st	1:07.4	–0.4	Yasunari Iwata	(Lady of Opera)
Mar 30	Chukyo	Takamatsunomiya Kinen	1	1,200 m (Heavy)	18	9	2.6 (1)	3rd	1:12.9	0.7	Yasunari Iwata	Copano Richard
May 18	Tokyo	Victoria Mile	1	1,600 m (Firm)	18	1	13.7 (6)	3rd	1:32.4	0.1	Yasunari Iwata	Verxina
Jun 22	Hakodate	Hakodate Sprint Stakes	3	1,200 m (Firm)	14	2	1.6 (1)	11th	1:09.1	0.6	Yasunari Iwata	Garbo
Oct 5	Niigata	Sprinters Stakes	1	1,200 m (Firm)	18	9	3.6 (2)	2nd	1:08.9	0.1	Yasunari Iwata	Snow Dragon
Dec 14	Sha Tin	Hong Kong Sprint	1	1,200 m (Firm)	14	13	7.3 (3)	3rd	1:08.9	0.2	Yasunari Iwata	Aerovelocity
2015 – six-year-old season
Mar 29	Chukyo	Takamatsunomiya Kinen	1	1,200 m (Good)	18	18	5.1 (1)	13th	1:09.7	1.2	Yasunari Iwata	Aerovelocity
May 17	Tokyo	Victoria Mile	1	1,600 m (Firm)	18	5	14.1 (5)	1st	1:31.9	0.0	Keita Tosaki	(Keiai Elegant)
Sep 13	Hanshin	Centaur Stakes	2	1,200 m (Firm)	16	12	4.4 (3)	4th	1:07.8	0.0	Keita Tosaki	Active Minoru
Oct 4	Nakayama	Sprinters Stakes	1	1,200 m (Firm)	15	2	4.4 (1)	1st	1:08.1	–0.1	Keita Tosaki	(Sakura Gospel)
Dec 13	Sha Tin	Hong Kong Sprint	1	1,200 m (Good)	14	14	12.0 (4)	9th	1:09.8	1.1	Keita Tosaki	Peniaphobia
2016 – seven-year-old season
Apr 9	Hanshin	Hanshin Himba Stakes	2	1,600 m (Firm)	13	13	5.9 (3)	9th	1:33.9	0.8	Keita Tosaki	Smart Layer
May 15	Tokyo	Victoria Mile	1	1,600 m (Firm)	18	13	17.7 (7)	1st	1:31.5	–0.4	Keita Tosaki	(Mikki Queen)

Legend:
Turf

== Assessment and awards ==
In the 2015 JRA Awards, Straight Girl finished second behind Shonan Pandora in the voting for the JRA Award for Best Older Filly or Mare and second to Maurice in the poll to determine the JRA Award for Best Sprinter or Miler. In the following year she finished third to Marialite in the Best Older Filly or Mare category.

== Breeding record and death ==
Straight Girl did not race after her second win in the Victoria Mile and was retired at the end of the season to become a broodmare. Her first foal, a colt sired by Frankel, was born in 2018 and continued to have seven more foals with the final one being sired by Equinox in 2026. Straight Girl died on 28 May 2026 at Ask Stud a week after surgery due to volvulus complication. She was 17.

== Pedigree ==
Pedigree of Straight Girl (JPN), bay mare 2009
Sire Fuji Kiseki (JPN) 1992	Sunday Silence (USA); 1986	Halo	Hail to Reason
Sire Fuji Kiseki (JPN) 1992	Sunday Silence (USA); 1986	Halo	Cosmah
Sire Fuji Kiseki (JPN) 1992	Sunday Silence (USA); 1986	Wishing Well	Understanding
Sire Fuji Kiseki (JPN) 1992	Sunday Silence (USA); 1986	Wishing Well	Mountain Flower
Sire Fuji Kiseki (JPN) 1992	Millracer (USA); 1983	Le Fabuleaux	Wild Risk
Sire Fuji Kiseki (JPN) 1992	Millracer (USA); 1983	Le Fabuleaux	Anguar
Sire Fuji Kiseki (JPN) 1992	Millracer (USA); 1983	Marston's Mill	In Reality
Sire Fuji Kiseki (JPN) 1992	Millracer (USA); 1983	Marston's Mill	Millicent
Dam Never Period (JPN) 2002	Taiki Shuttle (USA); 1994	Devil's Bag	Halo
Dam Never Period (JPN) 2002	Taiki Shuttle (USA); 1994	Devil's Bag	Ballade
Dam Never Period (JPN) 2002	Taiki Shuttle (USA); 1994	Welsh Muffin	Caerleon
Dam Never Period (JPN) 2002	Taiki Shuttle (USA); 1994	Welsh Muffin	Muffitys
Dam Never Period (JPN) 2002	Future Happy (JPN); 1997	Danehill	Danzig
Dam Never Period (JPN) 2002	Future Happy (JPN); 1997	Danehill	Razyana
Dam Never Period (JPN) 2002	Future Happy (JPN); 1997	Taisei Kagura	Morning Frolic
Dam Never Period (JPN) 2002	Future Happy (JPN); 1997	Taisei Kagura	Milly Bird (Family: 16-a)
