= Mikki Queen =

Japanese Thoroughbred racehorse

Mikki Queen; ミッキークイーン
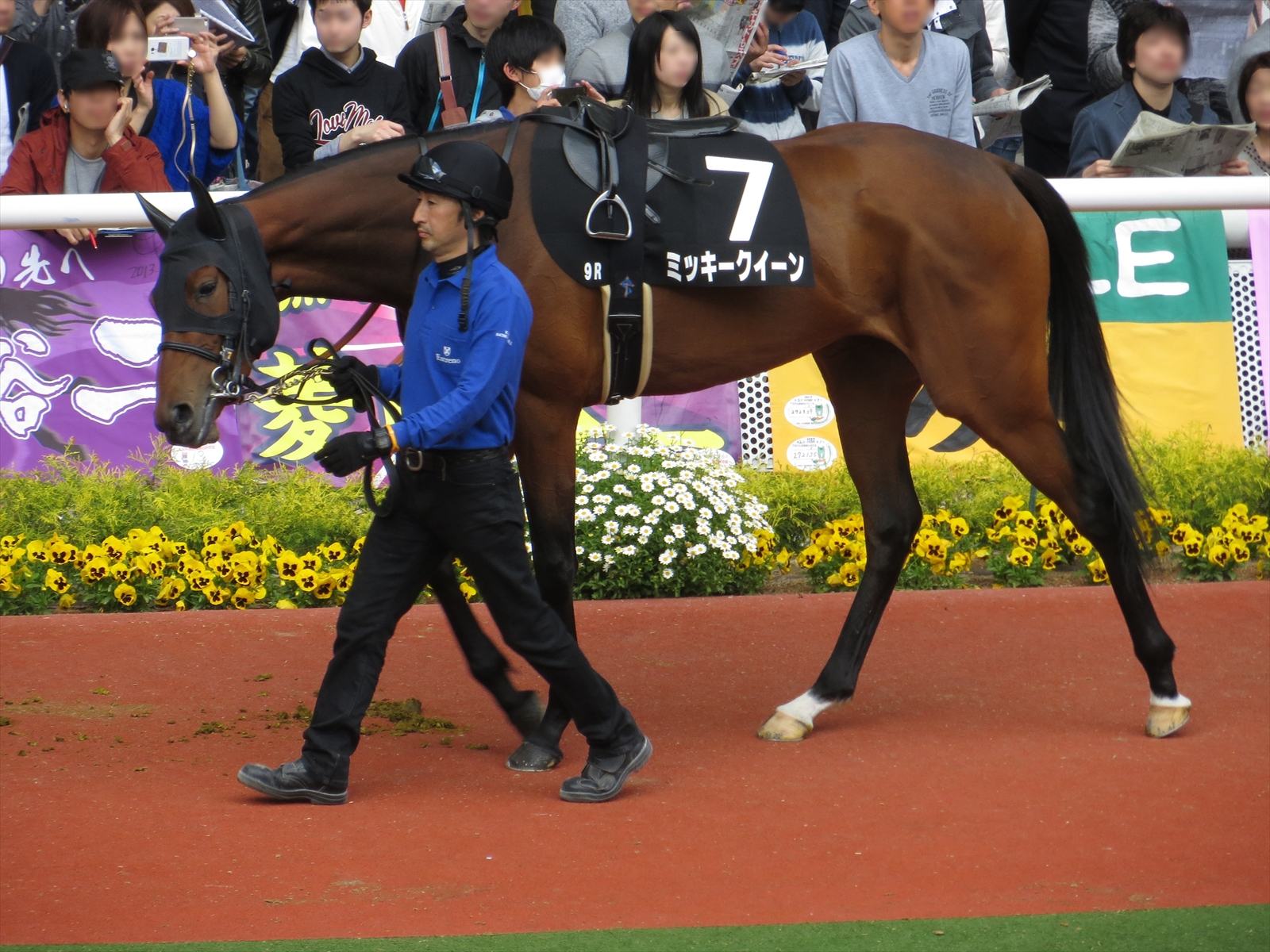
- Mikki Queen in 2015
- Sire: Deep Impact
- Grandsire: Sunday Silence
- Dam: Musical Way
- Damsire: Gold Away
- Sex: Mare
- Foaled: 8 February 2012
- Country: Japan
- Colour: Bay
- Breeder: Northern Farm
- Owner: Mizuki Noda
- Racing colours
- Trainer: Yasutoshi Ikee
- Jockey: Suguru Hamanaka
- Record: 17: 5-5-3
- Earnings: 511,310,000 JPY

Major wins
- Hanshin Himba Stakes (2017); Japanese Classic Tiara Race wins: Yushun Himba (2015); Shuka Sho (2015)

Awards
- JRA Award for Best Three-Year-Old Filly (2015)

Mikki Queen (Japanese: ミッキークイーン, Hepburn: Mikkī Kuīn; foaled 8 February 2012) is a Japanese retired Thoroughbred racehorse and active broodmare. She showed promise as a juvenile in 2014 when she won the second of her two starts. In 2015 she took the JRA Award for Best Three-Year-Old Filly after winning both the Yushun Himba and the Shuka Sho as well as finishing second in the Queen Cup and the Rose Stakes. She failed to win in 2016 when she had injury problems but ran second in the Victoria Mile and third in the Queen Elizabeth II Cup. As a five-year-old she won the Hanshin Himba Stakes and finished third in both the Takarazuka Kinen and the Queen Elizabeth II Cup before being retired from racing at the end of the year.

== Background ==
Mikki Queen is a bay mare with white socks on her hind legs bred in Japan by Northern Farm. As a yearling she was consigned to the Japan Racing Horse Association sale and was bought for 105,000,000 by Mizuki Noda. The filly was sent into training with Yasutoshi Ikee and was ridden in both of her races by Suguru Hamanaka. During her track career Mikki Queen was an unusually small Thoroughbred who usually weighed around 430 kg and lost up to 20 kg after a race.

She was from the fifth crop of foals sired by Deep Impact, who was the Japanese Horse of the Year in 2005 and 2006, winning races including the Tokyo Yushun, Tenno Sho, Arima Kinen and Japan Cup. Deep Impact's other progeny include Gentildonna, Harp Star, Kizuna, A Shin Hikari, Marialite and Saxon Warrior. Mikki Queen's dam Musical Way was a high-class performer in France, winning the Prix Dollar in 2007. She was descended from the American broodmare Jambo (foaled 1959), making her a distant relative of Nonoalco.

== Racing career ==
=== 2014: two-year-old season ===
On 7 December 2014 Mikki Queen began her racing career by finishing a close second to Gilda in an event for hitherto unraced juveniles over 1400 metres at Hanshin Racecourse. Two weeks later at the same track the filly recorded her first success as she won from seventeen opponents in a maiden race over 1600 metres.

=== 2015: three-year-old season ===
Mikki Queen began her second campaign in the Queen Cup (a trial race for the Oka Sho) over 1600 metres at Tokyo Racecourse in February and finished second to Cat Coin, beaten a neck by the winner. The filly missed the Oka Sho in April, as she had not earned sufficient prize money, and was stepped up in trip to win the Wasurenagusa Sho over 2000 metres earlier on the card.

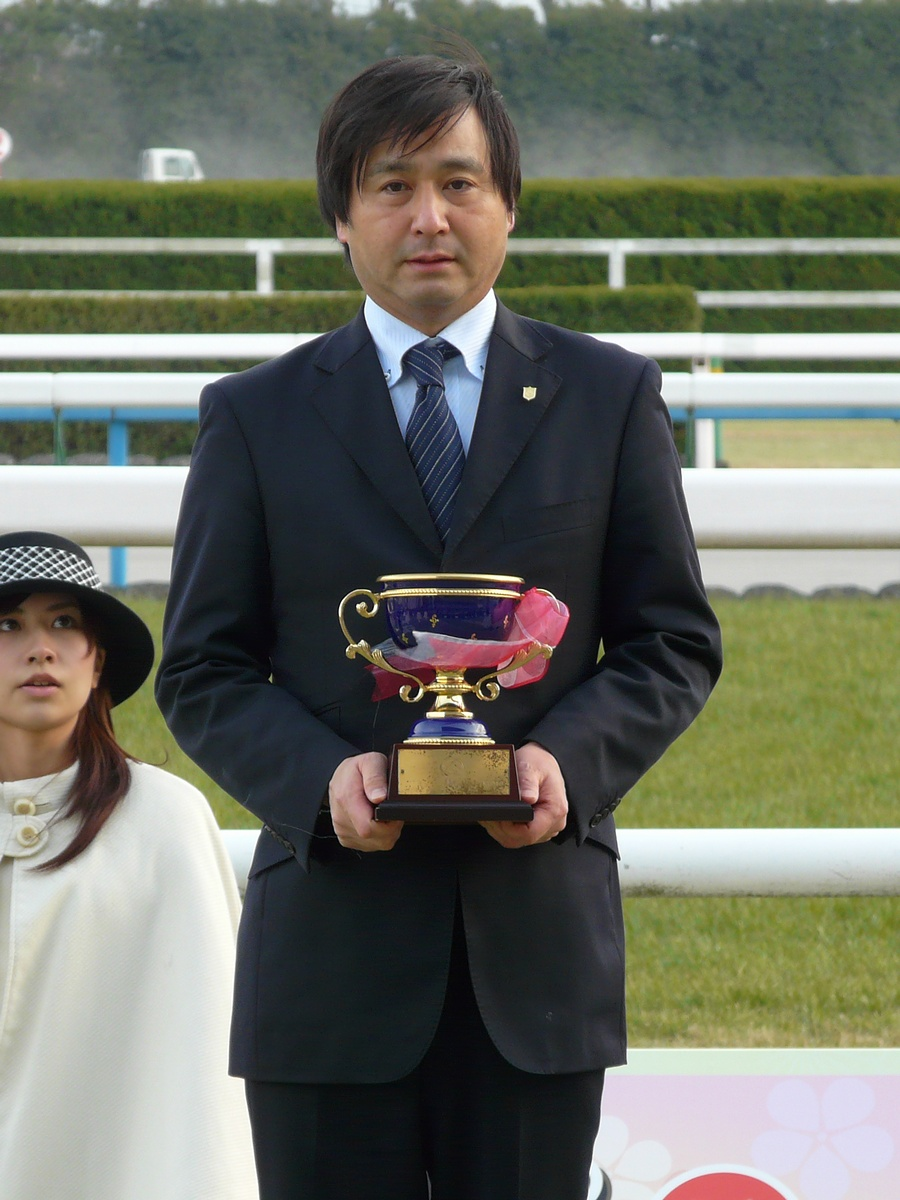
Mikki Queen's trainer Yasutoshi Ikee

In the 76th running of the Yushun Himba over 2400 metres at Tokyo on 24 May Mikki Queen started the 5.8/1 third favourite behind Rouge Buck (winner of the Kisaragi Sho) and the Oka Sho winner Let's Go Donki. The other fourteen runners included Kokorono Ai (Tulip Sho), Queens Ring (Fillies' Revue), Culminar (2nd in the Oka Sho) and Cat Coin. After racing towards the rear of the field, Mikki Queen produced a strong run in the straight, gained the advantage 50 metres from the finish and won by three-quarters of a length from Rouge Buck. Hamanaka commented "I'm so happy she was able to demonstrate her ability. I especially concentrated on her break since she's been struggling at it so far. I thought I would relax her so to get her turn of foot at the stretch. She responded well and quickened being driven, so I just prayed for the best."

After a break of almost four months Mikki Queen returned for the Rose Stakes (a trial for the Shuka Sho) over 1800 metres at Hanshin. She came from last place on the final turn to finish second one and a half lengths behind the winner Touching Speech with third place going to Tosen Victory. On 18 October the filly started 2/1 favourite for the 20th edition of the Shuka Sho over 2000 metres at Kyoto Racecourse when her seventeen opponents included Touching Speech, Let's Go Donki, Tosen Victory, Queens Ring, Kokorono Ai and Cat Coin. Starting from a draw on the far outside she raced in eighth place before making rapid progress on the inside in the straight and after taking the lead 100 metres out she held off the late challenge of Queens Ring to win by a neck. The winning time of 1:56.9 was a new record for the race. After the race Hamanaka said "she was just amazing. Her usual slow start wasn't that bad today and since the pace and surface was fast, I intentionally kept her near the pace. At the top of the stretch, I asked her to go right through the group of horses instead of going wide because I had faith in her strength and she responded beautifully."

In her final race of the year, Mikki Queen was matched against older horses and started third favourite for the Japan Cup over 2400 metres at Tokyo on 29 November. She came home eighth of eighteen runners, two and a half lengths behind the winner Shonan Pandora.

In the JRA Awards for 2015 Mikki Queen topped the poll for the JRA Award for Best Three-Year-Old Filly taking all 291 of the votes. In the official Japanese rankings Mikki Queen was rated equal with Let's Go Donki as the best three-year-old filly, nine pounds behind the top colt Duramente.

=== 2016: four-year-old season ===
On her four-year-old debut Mikki Queen started favourite for the Grade 2 Hanshin Himba Stakes over 1600 metres in April but failed by a neck to catch the front-running six-year-old mare Smart Layer. In the Grade 1 Victoria Mile at Tokyo in the following month she again started favourite but despite making rapid progress from the rear of the field in the straight she was beaten two and a half lengths into second by Straight Girl with Shonan Pandora and Smart Layer in third and fourth. Mikki Queen's return in autumn was delayed by an injury to her left foreleg and she was off the track for almost six months before contesting the Queen Elizabeth II Cup at Kyoto in November when she finished well to take third behind Queens Ring and Sing With Joy. On 25 December she ended her campaign by running fifth to Satono Diamond in the Arima Kinen.

In the JRA Awards for 2016 Mikki Queen finished fourth behind Marialite, Queens Ring and Straight Girl in the voting for the JRA Award for Best Older Filly or Mare. She was rated the third best older filly or mare in Japan behind Marialite and Straight Girl in the official Japanese ratings.

=== 2017: five-year-old season ===
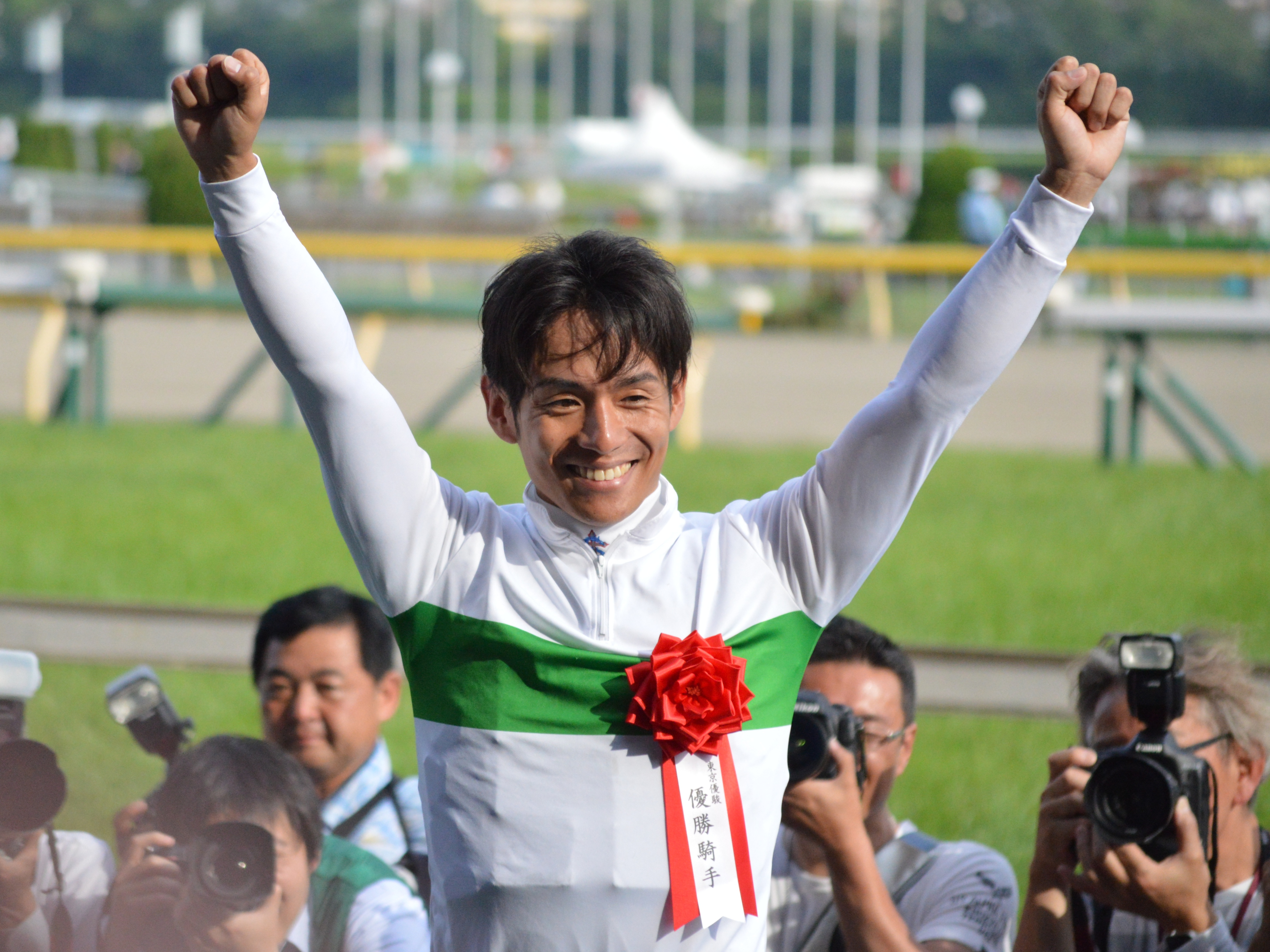
Mikki Queen's regular jockey Suguru Hamanaka

Mikki Queen began her fourth campaign on 8 April with a second attempt to win the Hanshin Himba Stakes and started 1.2/1 favourite ahead of fifteen opponents including Queens Ring, Admire Lead (Victoria Mile), Jour Polaire, Denim and Ruby (runner-up in the Japan Cup), Touching Speech and Meisho Mambo. After being settled in eighth place by Hamanaka, Mikki Queen was switched to the outside in the straight and took the lead in the closing stages to win by one and three quarter lengths from Admire Lead. She started odds-on favourite for the Victoria Mile on 14 May but after having trouble obtaining a clear run in the straight she came home seventh behind Admire Lead. On 25 June the mare was moved back up in distance to take on male opposition in the Takarazuka Kinen over 2200 metres at Hanshin and produced one of her best efforts as she finished third behind Satono Crown and Gold Actor with Rainbow Line, Cheval Grand and Kitasan Black finishing further back. As in the previous year, Mikki Queen began her autumn campaign by running third in the Queen Elizabeth II Cup; on this occasion she produced a "powerful late run" but was beaten a neck and a head by Mozu Katchan and Crocosmia in a three-way photo finish. The mare ended her track career on 24 December when she came home unplaced behind Kitasan Black in the Arima Kinen.

In the JRA Awards for 2017 Mikki Queen finished third behind Vivlos and Admire Lead in the voting for the JRA Award for Best Older Filly or Mare. She was rated the third best older filly or mare in Japan behind Vivlos and Queens Ring in the official Japanese ratings.

== Racing form ==
Mikki Queen won five races and placed in another eight out of 17 starts. This data is available in JBIS and netkeiba.

Date	Track	Race	Grade	Distance (Condition)	Entry	HN	Odds (Favored)	Finish	Time	Margins	Jockey	Winner (Runner-up)
2014 – two-year-old season
Dec 7	Hanshin	2yo Newcomer		1,400 m (Firm)	17	2	1.4 (1)	2nd	1:23.3	0.1	Suguru Hamanaka	Gilda
Dec 21	Hanshin	2yo Maiden		1,600 m (Soft)	18	12	2.1 (1)	1st	1:37.1	–0.3	Suguru Hamanaka	(Grandiflora)
2015 – three-year-old season
Feb 14	Tokyo	Queen Cup	3	1,600 m (Firm)	16	14	8.5 (3)	2nd	1:34.0	0.0	Suguru Hamanaka	Cat Coin
Apr 12	Hanshin	Wasurenagusa Sho	OP	2,000 m (Firm)	12	7	2.1 (1)	1st	2:03.5	–0.1	Suguru Hamanaka	(Roca)
May 24	Tokyo	Yushun Himba	1	2,400 m (Firm)	17	10	6.8 (3)	1st	2:25.0	–0.1	Suguru Hamanaka	(Rouge Buck)
Sep 20	Hanshin	Rose Stakes	2	1,800 m (Firm)	17	8	2.6 (1)	2nd	1:45.4	0.2	Suguru Hamanaka	Touching Speech
Oct 18	Kyoto	Shuka Sho	1	2,000 m (Firm)	18	18	3.0 (1)	1st	R1:56.9	0.0	Suguru Hamanaka	(Queens Ring)
Nov 29	Tokyo	Japan Cup	1	2,400 m (Firm)	18	11	5.0 (3)	8th	2:25.0	0.3	Suguru Hamanaka	Shonan Pandora
2016 – four-year-old season
Apr 9	Hanshin	Hanshin Himba Stakes	2	1,600 m (Firm)	13	6	2.4 (1)	2nd	1:33.1	0.0	Christophe Lemaire	Smart Layer
May 15	Tokyo	Victoria Mile	1	1,600 m (Firm)	18	10	3.4 (1)	2nd	1:31.9	0.4	Suguru Hamanaka	Straight Girl
Nov 13	Kyoto	QEII Cup	1	2,200 m (Firm)	15	1	3.6 (2)	3rd	2:13.1	0.2	Suguru Hamanaka	Queens Ring
Dec 25	Nakayama	Arima Kinen	1	2,500 m (Firm)	16	8	21.9 (7)	5th	2:33.0	0.4	Suguru Hamanaka	Satono Diamond
2017 – five-year-old season
Apr 8	Hanshin	Hanshin Himba Stakes	2	1,600 m (Soft)	16	6	2.2 (1)	1st	1:34.3	–0.3	Suguru Hamanaka	(Admire Lead)
May 14	Tokyo	Victoria Mile	1	1,600 m (Good)	17	11	1.9 (1)	7th	1:34.4	0.5	Suguru Hamanaka	Admire Lead
Jun 25	Hanshin	Takarazuka Kinen	1	2,200 m (Good)	11	8	10.4 (4)	3rd	2:11.7	0.3	Suguru Hamanaka	Satono Crown
Nov 12	Kyoto	QEII Cup	1	2,200 m (Firm)	18	10	7.2 (3)	3rd	2:14.3	0.0	Suguru Hamanaka	Mozu Katchan
Dec 24	Nakayama	Arima Kinen	1	2,500 m (Firm)	16	13	19.6 (5)	11th	2:34.5	0.9	Suguru Hamanaka	Kitasan Black

Legend:
Turf

== Breeding record ==
At the end of her racing career, Mikki Queen was retired to become a broodmare. She produced her first foal, a bay colt sired by Lord Kanaloa in 2019. In 2024, she got her first progeny to win the graded stakes which is Mikki Gorgeous who snatched the Aichi Hai title after three starts.

== Pedigree ==
Pedigree of Mikki Queen (JPN), bay filly, 2012
Sire Deep Impact (JPN) 2002	Sunday Silence (USA); 1986	Halo	Hail to Reason
Sire Deep Impact (JPN) 2002	Sunday Silence (USA); 1986	Halo	Cosmah
Sire Deep Impact (JPN) 2002	Sunday Silence (USA); 1986	Wishing Well	Understanding
Sire Deep Impact (JPN) 2002	Sunday Silence (USA); 1986	Wishing Well	Mountain Flower
Sire Deep Impact (JPN) 2002	Wind in Her Hair (IRE); 1991	Alzao (USA)	Lyphard
Sire Deep Impact (JPN) 2002	Wind in Her Hair (IRE); 1991	Alzao (USA)	Lady Rebecca (GB)
Sire Deep Impact (JPN) 2002	Wind in Her Hair (IRE); 1991	Burghclere (GB)	Busted
Sire Deep Impact (JPN) 2002	Wind in Her Hair (IRE); 1991	Burghclere (GB)	Highclere
Dam Musical Way (FR) 2002	Gold Away (IRE); 1995	Goldneyev (USA)	Nureyev
Dam Musical Way (FR) 2002	Gold Away (IRE); 1995	Goldneyev (USA)	Gold River (FR)
Dam Musical Way (FR) 2002	Gold Away (IRE); 1995	Blushing Away (USA)	Blushing Groom (FR)
Dam Musical Way (FR) 2002	Gold Away (IRE); 1995	Blushing Away (USA)	Sweet Revenge
Dam Musical Way (FR) 2002	Mulika (FR); 1987	Procida (USA)	Mr. Prospector
Dam Musical Way (FR) 2002	Mulika (FR); 1987	Procida (USA)	With Distinction
Dam Musical Way (FR) 2002	Mulika (FR); 1987	Gazelia	Icecapade (USA)
Dam Musical Way (FR) 2002	Mulika (FR); 1987	Gazelia	Dols Jaminque (USA) (Family: 2-s)
