= Meisho Mambo =

Japanese-bred Thoroughbred racehorse

Meisho Mambo メイショウマンボ
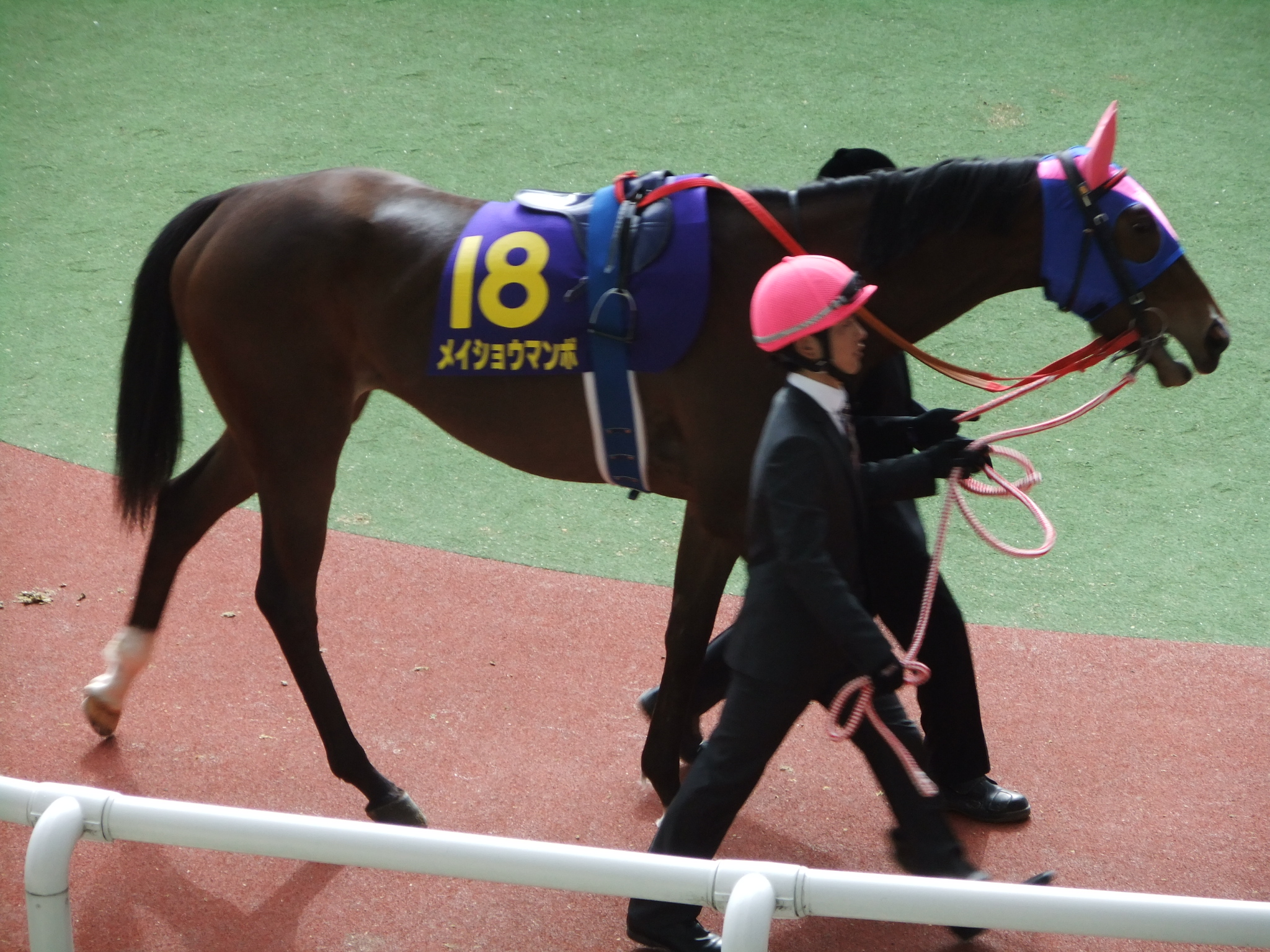
- Meisho Mambo in April 2013
- Sire: Suzuka Mambo
- Grandsire: Sunday Silence
- Dam: Meisho Momoka
- Damsire: Grass Wonder
- Sex: Mare
- Foaled: 25 February 2010
- Died: 25 April 2025 (aged 15)
- Country: Japan
- Colour: Bay
- Breeder: Kosho Bokujo
- Owner: Yoshio Matsumoto
- Racing colours
- Trainer: Akihiro Iida; Yuji Iida
- Jockey: Koshiro Take
- Record: 31: 6-2-0
- Earnings: ¥ 435,195,000 yen

Major wins
- Fillies' Revue (2013); Queen Elizabeth II Cup (2013); Japanese Classic Tiara Race wins: Yushun Himba (2013); Shuka Sho (2013)

Awards
- JRA Award for Best Three-Year-Old Filly (2013)

Meisho Mambo (Japanese: メイショウマンボ, Hepburn: Meishō Manbo; 25 February 2010 – 25 April 2025) was a Japanese Thoroughbred racehorse who won the second and third legs of the Japanese Fillies' Triple Crown in 2013. She showed some promise as a juvenile in 2012 when winning on her debut. In the following spring she won the Grade II Fillies' Revue and rebounded from a poor run in the Oka Sho to win the Grade I Yushun Himba. She returned in the autumn to win the Shuka Sho before defeating older fillies and mares in the Queen Elizabeth II Cup. She won the JRA Award for Best Three-Year-Old Filly of 2013. She stayed in training for three more seasons but failed to win again.

== Background ==
Meisho Mambo was a bay mare with a white sock on her right hind leg bred in Japan by Kosho Bokujo, the breeding farm of her owner Yoshio Matsumoto. She was sent into training with Akihiro Iida and was ridden in most of her races by Koshiro Take. In her races Meisho Mambo usually wore a hood in the blue and pink colours of her owner.

She was sired by Suzuka Mambo (a son of Sunday Silence) who recorded his biggest win in the spring edition of the 2005 Tenno Sho. The best of his other runners has been the Champions Cup winner Sambista. Meisho Mambo's dam Meisho Momoka showed no racing ability, failing to win or place in twelve starts. She was a female-line descendant of Dianne K, an American broodmare who was imported to Japan in the 1950s.

== Racing career ==
=== 2012: two-year-old season ===
On 25 November Meisho Mambo made a successful racecourse debut when she won an event for previously unraced juveniles over 1400 metres at Kyoto Racecourse. She was stepped up sharply in class for Japan's most prestigious race for two-year-old fillies, the Grade I Hanshin Juvenile Fillies over 1600 metres at Hanshin Racecourse in December and finished tenth of the eighteen runners, six lengths behind the winner Robe Tissage.

=== 2013: three-year-old season ===
==== Spring ====
Meisho Mambo began her second season by finishing second to Red Oval over 1400 metres at Kyoto in January and then won a minor race over 1600 metres at the same track on 16 February. On 10 March she moved back up in class for the Grade II Fillies' Revue (a trial race for the Oka Sho) over 1400 metres at Hanshin and started the 3.4/1 third favourite in sixteen-runner field. Ridden by Yuga Kawada, she won by one and a quarter lengths from Nancy Shine. In the Oka Sho (the first leg of the Triple Crown) on 7 April the filly started the 7.7/1 fifth choice in the betting but finished only tenth behind Ayusan, who won by a neck from Red Oval. On 19 May Meisho Mambo was moved up in distance for the Grade I Yushun Himba over 2400 metres at Tokyo Racecourse and started a 28/1 outsider in an eighteen-runner field. The Flora Stakes winner Denim and Ruby started favourite whilst the other fancied runners included Ayusan, Red Oval, Robe Tissage, Kurofune Surprise (Tulip Sho) and the Flora Stakes runner-up Ever Blossom. After positioning Meisho Mambo in mid-division along the rail, Koshiro Take switched the filly to the right to make a challenge down the centre of the track in the straight. She took the lead 300 metres from the finish and won by one and a quarter lengths from Ever Blossom, with Denim and Ruby two lengths back in third place. Interviewed after the race Take said "It has been rarer more than ever that I'm riding in Grade 1 races so I'm especially pleased. All the staff took care of her very well after the Oka Sho. Her owner has given me chances every time and I'm very happy to win such big race with his horse".

==== Autumn ====
After a break of almost four months Meisho Mambo returned in the Group II Rose Stakes over 1800 metres at Hanshin in September. She finished fourth of the eighteen runners, beaten half a length, a nose and a neck by Denim and Ruby, Chateau Blanche and Uliuli. The third leg of the Triple Crown, the Shuka Sho was run over 1200 metres at Kyoto on 13 October and Meisho Mambo started the 4.2/1 third favourite behind Denim and Ruby and Smart Layer. The other fancied runners included Ever Blossom, Chateau Blanche Uliuli and Robe Tissage. Drawn towards the outside of the eighteen-runner field Meisho Mambo settled in mid division by Koshiro Take as the pace was set by the outsiders Venus Trick and Senkisho. She produced a strong late run on the outside to take the lead 50 metres from the finish and won by one and a quarter lengths from Smart Layer who came out best in a blanket finish for second. Smart Layer was ridden by Take's more famous older brother Yutaka. Koshiro Take commented "I was confident because her condition has been better. The stalls position was near the outside so I worried it a little but I decided to use her excellent stride."

At Kyoto on 10 November Meisho Mambo was matched against older fillies and mares for the first time in the Queen Elizabeth II Cup over 2200 metres and started 2.9/1 second favourite behind the four-year-old Verxina the winner of the 2013 Victoria Mile. The other runners included Denim and Ruby, Whale Capture (2012 Victoria Mile) and All That Jazz (Fukushima Himba Stakes). Racing on soft ground on a rainy day she came from well off the pace to take the lead 200 metres from the finish and won by one and a quarter lengths and a neck from Lachesis and Aromatico. After the race Take said "This race was much tougher than the previous race, but she's a really strong filly and I’m looking forward to taking on stronger horses now."

In January 2014 at the JRA Awards Meisho Mambo was unanimously voted Japan's champion three-year-old filly of 2013.

=== 2014–2016: Later career ===
When Akihiro Iida retired in February 2014 his stable was taken over by his son Yuji Iida. Meisho Mambo began her third season by taking on male opposition in the Osaka Hai in April and finishing seventh of the eight runners behind Kizuna. On 18 May at Tokyo she produced her best performance of the season as she finished a half length second to Verxina in the Victoria Mile with Straight Girl, Whale Capture, Denim and Ruby, Smart Layer, Robe Tissage, Ever Blossom, Lachesis and Uliuli finishing behind. She made little impact in her four subsequent races that year, finishing unplaced in the Takarazuka Kinen, Kyoto Daishoten, Queen Elizabeth II Cup and Arima Kinen.

Meisho Mambo remained in training for two more years but has never recovered her best form. She finished no better than sixth in seven races as a five-year-old and was unplaced in all of her six races in 2016, as well as her two races the following year.

== Racing form ==
Meisho Mambo won six races out of 31 starts. This data is available based on JBIS and netkeiba.

| Date | Track | Race | Grade | Distance (Condition) | Entry | HN | Odds (Favored) | Finish | Time | Margins | Jockey | Winner (Runner-up) |
|---|---|---|---|---|---|---|---|---|---|---|---|---|
2012 – two-year-old season
| Nov 25 | Kyoto | 2yo Newcomer | | 1,400 m (Firm) | 16 | 16 | 2.6 (1) | 1st | 1:23.3 | –0.2 | Yuji Iida | (Seno Queen) |
| Dec 9 | Hanshin | Hanshin Juvenile Fillies | 1 | 1,600 m (Firm) | 18 | 4 | 78.4 (14) | 10th | 1:35.0 | 0.8 | Yuji Iida | Robe Tissage |
2013 – three-year-old season
| Jan 14 | Kyoto | Kobai Stakes | OP | 1,400 m (Soft) | 16 | 15 | 24.0 (7) | 2nd | 1:24.0 | 0.5 | Koshiro Take | Red Oval |
| Feb 16 | Kyoto | Kobushi Sho | ALW (1W) | 1,600 m (Good) | 9 | 2 | 3.3 (2) | 1st | 1:37.2 | –0.2 | Koshiro Take | (Dynamic Guy) |
| Mar 10 | Hanshin | Fillies' Revue | 2 | 1,400 m (Firm) | 16 | 4 | 4.4 (3) | 1st | 1:22.1 | –0.2 | Yuga Kawada | (Nancy Shine) |
| Apr 7 | Hanshin | Oka Sho | 1 | 1,600 m (Firm) | 18 | 18 | 8.7 (4) | 10th | 1:35.9 | 0.9 | Koshiro Take | Ayusan |
| May 19 | Tokyo | Yushun Himba | 1 | 2,400 m (Firm) | 18 | 3 | 28.5 (9) | 1st | 2:25.2 | –0.2 | Koshiro Take | (Ever Blossom) |
| Sep 15 | Hanshin | Rose Stakes | 2 | 1,800 m (Soft) | 18 | 18 | 5.4 (4) | 4th | 1:47.8 | 0.1 | Koshiro Take | Denim and Ruby |
| Oct 13 | Kyoto | Shuka Sho | 1 | 2,000 m (Firm) | 18 | 16 | 5.2 (3) | 1st | 1:58.6 | –0.2 | Koshiro Take | (Smart Layer) |
| Nov 10 | Kyoto | QEII Cup | 1 | 2,200 m (Soft) | 18 | 3 | 3.9 (2) | 1st | 2:16.6 | –0.2 | Koshiro Take | (Lachesis) |
2014 – four-year-old season
| Apr 6 | Hanshin | Sankei Osaka Hai | 2 | 2,000 m (Firm) | 8 | 5 | 6.4 (3) | 7th | 2:02.5 | 2.2 | Koshiro Take | Kizuna |
| May 18 | Tokyo | Victoria Mile | 1 | 1,600 m (Firm) | 18 | 4 | 5.5 (3) | 2nd | 1:32.4 | 0.1 | Koshiro Take | Verxina |
| Jun 29 | Hanshin | Takarazuka Kinen | 1 | 2,200 m (Firm) | 12 | 10 | 10.4 (4) | 11th | 2:15.4 | 1.5 | Koshiro Take | Gold Ship |
| Oct 14 | Kyoto | Kyoto Daishoten | 2 | 2,400 m (Firm) | 12 | 9 | 4.7 (2) | 10th | 2:25.4 | 1.2 | Koshiro Take | Last Impact |
| Nov 16 | Kyoto | QEII Cup | 1 | 2,200 m (Firm) | 18 | 6 | 5.6 (2) | 12th | 2:13.0 | 1.0 | Koshiro Take | Lachesis |
| Dec 28 | Nakayama | Arima Kinen | 1 | 2,500 m (Firm) | 16 | 8 | 86.3 (14) | 15th | 2:36.4 | 1.1 | Koshiro Take | Gentildonna |
2015 – five-year-old season
| Apr 11 | Hanshin | Hanshin Himba Stakes | 2 | 1,400 m (Good) | 17 | 15 | 10.8 (6) | 13th | 1:22.1 | 1.0 | Koshiro Take | Cafe Brilliant |
| May 17 | Tokyo | Victoria Mile | 1 | 1,600 m (Firm) | 18 | 13 | 24.5 (8) | 17th | 1:33.7 | 1.8 | Koshiro Take | Straight Girl |
| Jun 7 | Tokyo | Yasuda Kinen | 1 | 1,600 m (Firm) | 17 | 4 | 59.9 (15) | 14th | 1:33.0 | 1.0 | Koshiro Take | Maurice |
| Jul 1 | Kawasaki | Sparking Lady Cup | JPN3 | 1,600 m (Sloppy) | 12 | 6 | 7.1 (4) | 6th | 1:43.2 | 2.4 | Koshiro Take | Trois Bonheur |
| Oct 17 | Tokyo | Fuchu Himba Stakes | 2 | 1,800 m (Good) | 17 | 7 | 22.4 (8) | 14th | 1:47.4 | 1.1 | Koshiro Take | Nobori Diana |
| Nov 15 | Kyoto | QEII Cup | 1 | 2,200 m (Good) | 18 | 13 | 55.2 (12) | 17th | 2:15.9 | 1.0 | Koshiro Take | Marialite |
| Dec 5 | Chukyo | Kinko Sho | 2 | 2,000 m (Firm) | 12 | 3 | 41.7 (10) | 12th | 2:02.1 | 3.3 | Koshiro Take | Mitra |
2016 – six-year-old season
| Jan 5 | Kyoto | Kyoto Kimpai | 3 | 1,600 m (Firm) | 17 | 5 | 31.3 (10) | 14th | 1:33.9 | 0.9 | Koshiro Take | Win Primera |
| Apr 9 | Hanshin | Hanshin Himba Stakes | 2 | 1,600 m (Firm) | 13 | 11 | 72.7 (9) | 13th | 1:34.3 | 1.2 | Koshiro Take | Smart Layer |
| May 15 | Tokyo | Victoria Mile | 1 | 1,600 m (Firm) | 18 | 8 | 117.8 (17) | 12th | 1:33.2 | 1.7 | Koshiro Take | Straight Girl |
| Jun 12 | Hanshin | Mermaid Stakes | 3 | 2,000 m (Firm) | 14 | 9 | 23.9 (12) | 11th | 2:00.5 | 1.2 | Koshiro Take | Lilavati |
| Oct 15 | Tokyo | Fuchu Himba Stakes | 2 | 1,800 m (Firm) | 13 | 4 | 48.6 (10) | 13th | 1:48.1 | 1.5 | Koshiro Take | Queens Ring |
| Nov 13 | Kyoto | QEII Cup | 1 | 2,200 m (Firm) | 15 | 5 | 74.6 (13) | 12th | 2:14.0 | 1.1 | Kenichi Ikezoe | Queens Ring |
2017 – seven-year-old season
| Mar 12 | Nakayama | Nakayama Himba Stakes | 3 | 1,800 m (Firm) | 16 | 8 | 82.9 (13) | 14th | 1:50.4 | 1.0 | Yoshitomi Shibata | Tosen Victory |
| Apr 8 | Hanshin | Hanshin Himba Stakes | 2 | 1,600 m (Soft) | 16 | 7 | 72.4 (11) | 14th | 1:36.1 | 1.8 | Futoshi Komaki | Mikki Queen |

Legend:
Turf Dirt

== Retirement and death ==
After retiring in 2017, Meisho Mambo became a broodmare at Kosho Bokujo. She has produced seven foals in total.

After giving birth to a Hokko Tarumae foal on April 9, 2025, she suffered from postpartum bleeding, which ultimately led to her death on April 25, 2025.

=== Breeding record ===
c = colt, f = filly

| No. | Name | Year | Sex | Color | Sire | Wins | Races | Remarks |
|---|---|---|---|---|---|---|---|---|
| 1st | Meisho Ichihime | 2018 | f | Brown | Meisho Bowler | 1 | 8 | Retired, broodmare |
| 2nd | Meisho Himesama | 2019 | f | Bay | Meisho Samson | 0 | 5 | Retired, broodmare |
| 3rd | Meisho Kaminoko | 2020 | f | Dark Bay | Lord Kanaloa | 0 | 3 | Retired, broodmare |
| 4th | Meisho Magoichi | 2021 | c | Chestnut | Epiphaneia | 5 | 26 | Active |
| 5th | Meisho Ichimon | 2022 | c | Chestnut | Epiphaneia | 2 | 16 | Active |
| 6th | Meisho Rankei | 2023 | c | Bay | Rey de Oro | 1 | 9 | Active |
| | (not foaled) | 2024 | | | Kitasan Black | | | |
| 7th | (Meisho Mambo 2025) | 2025 | c | Bay | Hokko Tarumae | | | |

== Pedigree ==
Pedigree of Meisho Mambo (JPN), bay mare, 2010
| Sire Suzuka Mambo (JPN) 2001 | Sunday Silence (USA); 1986 | Halo (USA) | Hail To Reason (USA) |
| Sire Suzuka Mambo (JPN) 2001 | Sunday Silence (USA); 1986 | Halo (USA) | Cosmah (USA) |
| Sire Suzuka Mambo (JPN) 2001 | Sunday Silence (USA); 1986 | Wishing Well (USA) | Understanding (USA) |
| Sire Suzuka Mambo (JPN) 2001 | Sunday Silence (USA); 1986 | Wishing Well (USA) | Mountain Flower (USA) |
| Sire Suzuka Mambo (JPN) 2001 | Spring Mambo (GB); 1995 | Kingmambo (USA) | Mr. Prospector (USA) |
| Sire Suzuka Mambo (JPN) 2001 | Spring Mambo (GB); 1995 | Kingmambo (USA) | Miesque (USA) |
| Sire Suzuka Mambo (JPN) 2001 | Spring Mambo (GB); 1995 | Key Flyer (USA) | Nijinsky (CAN) |
| Sire Suzuka Mambo (JPN) 2001 | Spring Mambo (GB); 1995 | Key Flyer (USA) | Key Partner (USA) |
| Dam Meisho Momoka (JPN) 2002 | Grass Wonder (USA); 1995 | Silver Hawk (USA) | Roberto (USA) |
| Dam Meisho Momoka (JPN) 2002 | Grass Wonder (USA); 1995 | Silver Hawk (USA) | Gris Vitesse (USA) |
| Dam Meisho Momoka (JPN) 2002 | Grass Wonder (USA); 1995 | Ameriflora (USA) | Danzig (USA) |
| Dam Meisho Momoka (JPN) 2002 | Grass Wonder (USA); 1995 | Ameriflora (USA) | Graceful Touch (USA) |
| Dam Meisho Momoka (JPN) 2002 | Meisho Ayame (JPN); 1995 | Jade Robbery (USA) | Mr. Prospector (USA) |
| Dam Meisho Momoka (JPN) 2002 | Meisho Ayame (JPN); 1995 | Jade Robbery (USA) | Number (USA) |
| Dam Meisho Momoka (JPN) 2002 | Meisho Ayame (JPN); 1995 | Will Moon (JPN) | Mill George (GB) |
| Dam Meisho Momoka (JPN) 2002 | Meisho Ayame (JPN); 1995 | Will Moon (JPN) | Dianne Venture (JPN) (Family:9-c) |

- Meisho Mambo was inbred 4 × 4 to Mr. Prospector, meaning that this stallion appears twice in the fourth generation of her pedigree.
