= Queen Cup =

Queen Cup クイーンカップ
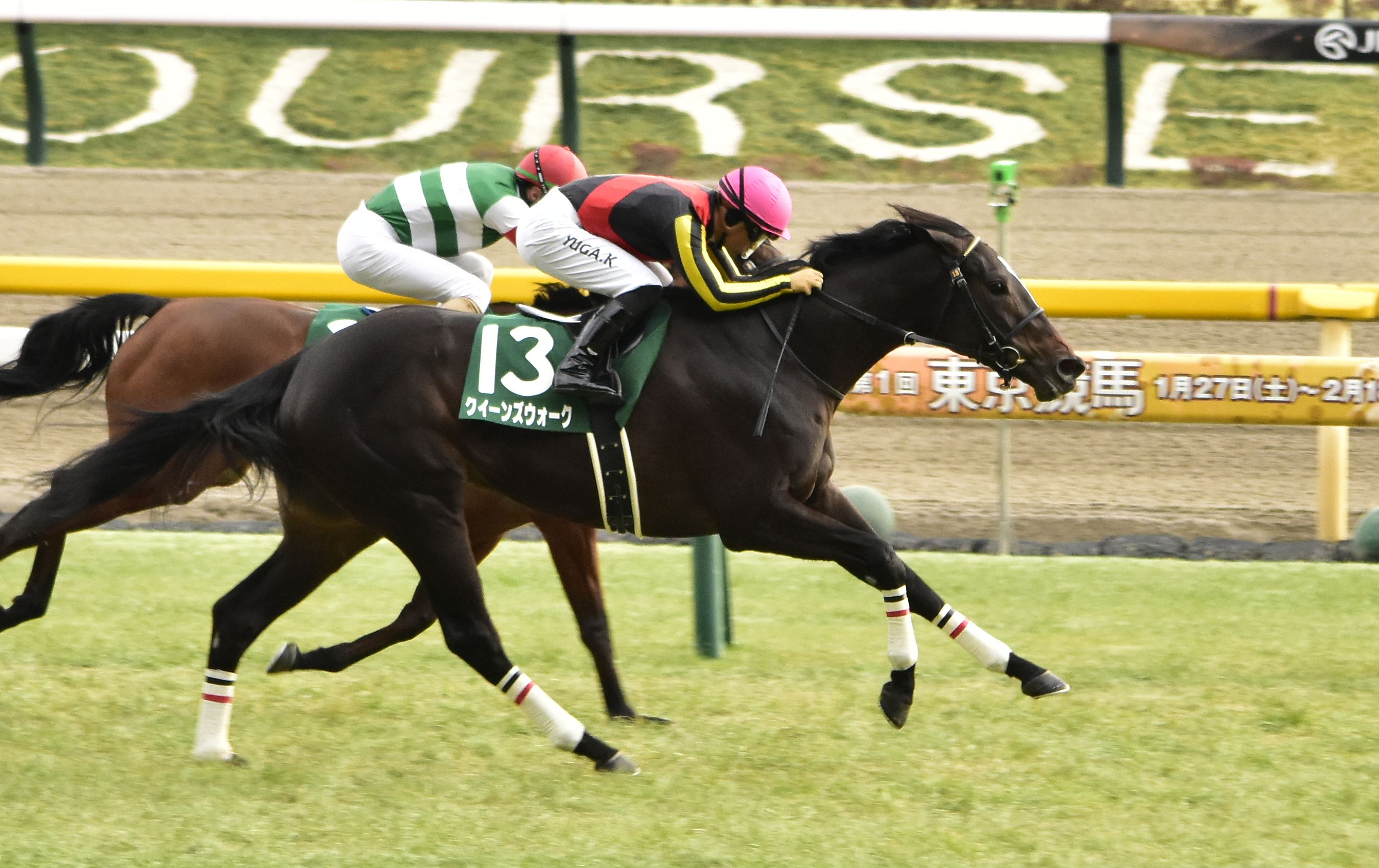
- 2024 Queen Cup winner Queen's Walk
- Class: Grade 3
- Location: Tokyo Racecourse
- Inaugurated: 1966
- Race type: Thoroughbred Flat racing

Race information
- Distance: 1600 metres
- Surface: Turf
- Track: Left-handed
- Qualification: 3-y-o fillies
- Weight: 55 kg
- Purse: ¥ 82,380,000 (as of 2026): 1st: ¥ 38,000,000; 2nd: ¥ 15,000,000; 3rd: ¥ 10,000,000

The Queen Cup (Japanese クイーンカップ) is a Grade 3 horse race for three-year-old Thoroughbred fillies run in February over a distance of 1600 metres at Tokyo Racecourse.

The race was first run in 1966 and was elevated to Grade 3 status in 1984. It was contested at a variety of venues but has been run over its current course and distance since 1981. The race serves as a trial race for the Oka Sho, run in early April, which it is the traditional start to the annual classic races for three-year-olds in Japan.

== Winners since 1975 ==
Year	Winner	Jockey	Trainer	Owner	Time
1975^{[a]}	Yone Minoru	Seiji Ebisawa	Akimitsu Narumiya	Kunitake Tadokoro	1:46.2
1976^{[b]}	Titania	Isao Shimada	Yukio Inaba	Hachie Hara	1:41.4
1977^{[b]}	Masaki Bizen	Yukio Okabe	Akimitsu Narumiya	Shozo Fujita	1:37.0
1978^{[b]}	Kiku Kimiko	Tomio Yasuda	Zen'ei Ishige	Syosaku Suzuki	1:36.9
1979^{[b]}	Sea Bird Park	Tsugio Kosako	Shigehiko Hongo	Horseman Club	1:36.9
1980^{[b]}	Polly Tosho	Hayato Minoda	Suenosuke Mori	Tosho Sangyo	1:36.0
1981	Kabari Elie Ace	Yukio Okabe	Katsumi Sato	Kabari Nakagawa Bokujo	1:36.0
1982	Victoria Crown	Isao Shimada	Yukio Inaba	Masatake Iida	1:36.3
1983	Das Genie	Shoichi Osaki	Tsutomu Niizeki	Takeshi Mishima	1:36.6
1984	Aino Feather	Yukio Okabe	Akimitsu Narumiya	Takashi Tanaka	1:39.7
1985	Takara Steal	Yoshikatsu Sato	Eizaburo Sakamoto	Yoshio Murayama	1:36.1
1986	Super Shot	Sueo Masuzawa	Hiroaki Moriyasu	Iwao Obara	1:35.5
1987	Nakami Julianne	Hiroyuki Gohara	Katsumi Yagisawa	Mitoshi Nakamura	1:35.8
1988	Circle Showa	Tomio Yasuda	Sueki Koga	Kanchu Kamada	1:35.8
1989	Cutting Edge	Masato Shibata	Hideo Takahashi	Shadai Race Horse	1:36.7
1990	Sweet Mithuna	Yukio Okabe	Yasuhisa Matsuyama	Tomohiro Wada	1:35.2
1991	Scarlet Bouquet	Yutaka Take	Yuji Ito	Katsumi Yoshida	1:35.4
1992	Sanei Thank You	Shinji Azuma	Katsumi Sato	Kiyoshi Iwasaki	1:36.0
1993	Mother Tosho	Norihiro Yokoyama	Shinji Okuhira	Tosho Sangyo	1:35.1
1994	Hishi Amazon	Eiji Nakadate	Takao Nakano	Masaichiro Abe	1:35.3
1995	Eishin Berlin	Katsumi Minai	Masanori Sakaguchi	Toyomitsu Hirai	1:35.5
1996	Ibuki Perceive	Yutaka Take	Kojiro Hashiguchi	Ibuki	1:34.4
1997	Orange Peel	Katsuharu Tanaka	Kenji Yamauchi	Shadai Race Horse	1:36.4
1998	Eidai Queen	Takanori Kikuzawa	Yasuhiro Suzuki	Toshin Bokujo	1:35.2
1999	Umeno Fiber	Masayoshi Ebina	Ikuo Aizawa	Toshinori Umezaki	1:36.6
2000	Future Sunday	Norihiro Yokoyama	Masanori Ito	Toshihiro Hirosaki	1:36.1
2001	Success Strain	Hatsuhiro Kowata	Ryuichi Inaba	Yoshio Suzuki	1:34.7
2002	Shinin Ruby	Yukio Okabe	Kazuo Fujisawa	Yoshimi Ichikawa	1:34.6
2003^{[b]}	Chunyi	Hiroki Goto	Nobuhiro Suzuki	Hiroyoshi Usuda	1:35.6
2004	Daiwa El Cielo	Yuichi Fukunaga	Kunihide Matsuda	Daiwa Co.,ltd	1:34.3
2005	Lailaps	Yutaka Take	Kunihide Matsuda	Sunday Racing	1:38.1
2006	Koiuta	Christophe Lemaire	Masashi Okuhira	Maekawa Kikaku	1:35.6
2007	Excuse	Hiroshi Kitamura	Yuichi Shikato	Shigeyuki Okada	1:34.5
2008	Little Amapola	Koshiro Take	Hiroyuki Nagahama	Shadai Race Horse	1:35.5
2009	Dear Geena	Hiroyuki Uchida	Yasuhito Tamura	Dearest	1:35.7
2010	Apricot Fizz	Masayoshi Ebina	Futoshi Kojima	Shadai Race Horse	1:34.4
2011	Whale Capture	Kenichi Ikezoe	Kiyotaka Tanaka	Masaru Shimada	1:35.4
2012	Verxina	Yasunari Iwata	Yasuo Tomomichi	Kazuhiro Sasaki	1:36.6
2013	Ukiyono Kaze	William Buick	Takanori Kikuzawa	Jun Kokubun	1:34.6
2014	Forevermore	Masayoshi Ebina	Yuichi Shikato	Sunday Racing	1:35.7
2015	Cat Coin	Yoshitomi Shibata	Yoshitaka Ninomiya	Sunday Racing	1:34.0
2016	Major Emblem	Christophe Lemaire	Yasuhito Tamura	Sunday Racing	1:32.5
2017	Admire Miyabi	Christophe Lemaire	Yasuo Tomomichi	Riichi Kondo	1:33.2
2018	Tetradrachm	Hironobu Tanabe	Kazuo Konishi	Katsumi Yoshida	1:33.7
2019	Chrono Genesis	Yuichi Kitamura	Takashi Saito	Sunday Racing	1:34.2
2020	Miyamazakura	Yuichi Fukunaga	Hideaki Fujiwara	Kaneko Makoto Holdings	1:34.0
2021	Akaitorino Musume	Keita Tosaki	Sakae Kunieda	Kaneko Makoto Holdings	1:33.3
2022	Presage Lift	Keita Tosaki	Tetsuya Kimura	Sunday Racing	1:34.1
2023	Harper	Yuga Kawada	Yasuo Tomomichi	M's Racing	1:33.1
2024	Queen's Walk	Yuga Kawada	Mitsumasa Nakauchida	Sunday Racing	1:33.1
2025	Embroidery	Christophe Lemaire	Kazutomo Mori	Silk Racing	1:32.2
2026	Dream Core	Christophe Lemaire	Kiyoshi Hagiwara	Katsumi Yoshida	1:32.6

^{a} The 1975 race took place at Nakayama Racecourse on dirt over a distance of 1700 metres.
^{b} Between 1976 and 1980, and in 2003, the race took place at Nakayama Racecourse over a distance of 1600 metres.

== Earlier winners ==
- 1966 - Mejiro Majorca
- 1967 - Ichiko
- 1968 - Black Vatout
- 1969 - Sceptre Ciro
- 1970 - Tamami
- 1971 - Yama Azuma
- 1972 - Takai Homa
- 1973 - Kikuno Tsubame
- 1974 - Lester Horse

== See also ==
- Horse racing in Japan
- List of Japanese flat horse races
