= Verxina =

Japanese-bred Thoroughbred racehorse

Verxina ヴィルシーナ
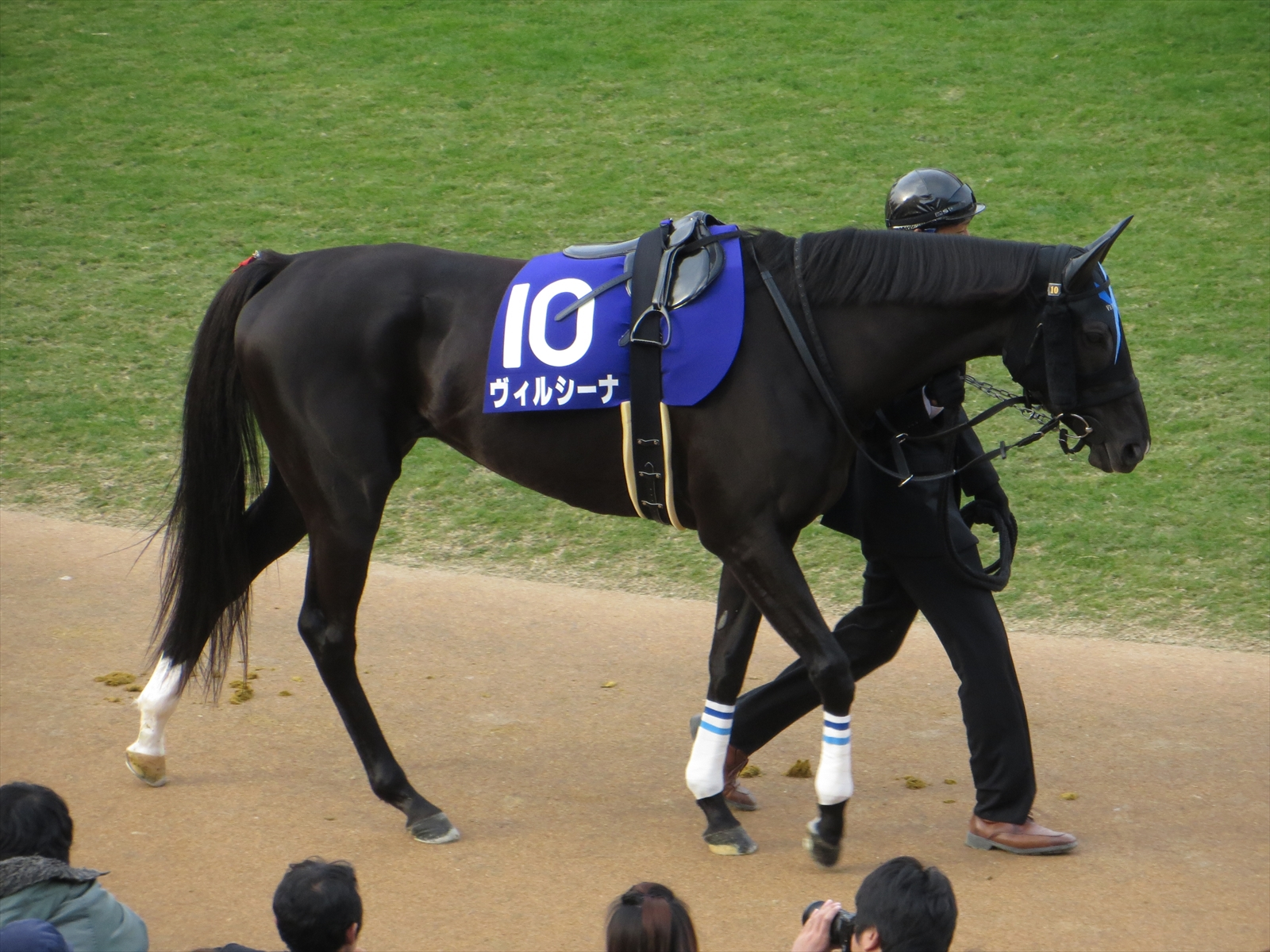
- Verxina at the paddock of the 2014 Queen Elizabeth II Cup.
- Breed: Thoroughbred
- Sire: Deep Impact (JPN)
- Grandsire: Sunday Silence (USA)
- Dam: Halwa Sweet (JPN)
- Damsire: Machiavellian (USA)
- Sex: Mare
- Foaled: March 5, 2009 (age 17)
- Country: Japan
- Color: Black
- Breeder: Northern Farm
- Owner: Kazuhiro Sasaki
- Racing colors
- Trainer: Yasuo Tomomichi
- Jockey: Hiroyuki Uchida
- Record: 21: 5-5-2
- Earnings: ¥460,795,000

Major wins
- Queen Cup (2012); Victoria Mile (2013, 2014)

Verxina (Japanese: ヴィルシーナ, Hepburn: Virushīna; foaled March 5, 2009) is a retired Japanese Thoroughbred racehorse and broodmare. She was sired by Deep Impact, and out of Halwa Sweet. She is owned by a former professional baseball player, Kazuhiro Sasaki.

== Early life ==
Verxina, a black mare with a diamond-shaped star and strip, was foaled on March 5, 2009, by Deep Impact out of Halwa Sweet. She was bred by Northern Farm in Abira, Hokkaido, Japan. Verxina's dam, Halwa Sweet, who was famous for being born without a tail, went on to give birth to two other successful racehorses, Cheval Grand and Vivlos, both of which are also owned by Sasaki. Her sire, Deep Impact, was a champion racehorse known for winning the Japanese Triple Crown and earning a title in the Japanese Racing Association Hall of Fame.

== Racing career ==
She began her racing career as a 2-year-old, but debuted as a 3-year-old at the Queen Cup. Her major wins were at the Queen Cup, and twice at the Victoria Mile. During her time as a racer, Verxina represented the stables she resided in, Yasuo Tomomichi, twice.

Verxina was ridden by Hiroyuki Uchida for most of her races.

=== 2012: three-year-old season ===
At age 3, Verxina won the Queen Cup in Japan. She placed second at the Yushun Himba, Oka Sho and the Shuka Sho, all to her paternal half-sister Gentildonna. She also came in second in the Queen Elizabeth II Commemorative Cup, and Kansai Telecasting Corporation Sho Rose Stakes.

=== 2013: four-year old season ===
At age 4, Verxina started off by placing 6th at the Sankei Osaka Hai, losing out to Orfevre. She then won the Victoria Mile while being the favourite to win the race.

Following her win at the Victoria Mile, she raced in the Yasuda Kinen, Kyoto Daishoten, Queen Elizabeth 2 Cup and the Japan Cup.

She was the favourite at the Queen Elizabeth II Cup, but was unable to convert that into a win, finishing 10th.

=== 2014–2015: five-year old season and retirement ===
As a 5 year old, Verxina raced in the Tokyo Shimbun Hai and the Hanshin Himba Stakes, in which she suffered major defeats by finishing 11th in both races.

She then entered the Victoria Mile to defend her title, and with her poor form at the previous two races, she was the 11th favourite to win the race. Verxina had an explosive start in the race to take the lead and managed to keep it all the way to the end, sealing a historic back to back win at the Victoria Mile. She was the first back to back winner since the inauguration of the race in 2006.

After the Victoria Mile, she went to Takarazuka Kinen. She was the 8th favourite in this race, with the favourite to win being Gold Ship. With Yuichi Fukunaga at the helm for this race, she started the race in her usual style, keeping the lead until the final straight. Entering the final straight, she started losing steam and eventually around 100m before the finish line, she was overtaken by Gold Ship and Curren Mirotic, finishing 3rd.

In autumn, Verxina went to the Queen Elizabeth II Cup for the 3rd time as well as the Arima Kinen, but lost both races.

On January 5, 2015, Verxina retired at age 5 to become a breeding mare at the Northern Farm in Abira, Hokkaido.

== Breeding career ==
Verxina has produced five offspring. Her most successful foals include Bravas (by King Kamehameha) who won the Niigata Kinen in 2020 and Divina (by Maurice) who won the 2023 Fuchu Himba Stakes.

From 2022 to 2026, she had five consecutive failed attempts to conceive and miscarriages. On July 1, 2026, Verxina was retired from broodmare duty.

=== Breeding record ===
c = colt, f = filly

No.	Name	Foaled	Sex	Color	Sire	Wins	Races	Remarks
1st	Bravas	2016	c	Bay	King Kamehameha	5	26	Retired
2nd	Leviosa	2017	c	Dark Bay	King Kamehameha	1	12	Retired
3rd	Divina	2018	f	Bay	Maurice	5	20	Retired, broodmare
4th	Gravitas	2019	f	Bay	King Kamehameha			Did not race, broodmare
	(not foaled)	2020			Lord Kanaloa			
5th	Vestria	2021	f	Chestnut	Rey de Oro	0	7	Retired, broodmare
	(not foaled)	2022			Epiphaneia			
	(not foaled)	2023			Maurice			
	(not foaled)	2024			Saturnalia			
	(not foaled)	2025			Epiphaneia			
	(not foaled)	2026			Siskin			

== In popular culture ==
An anthropomorphized version of Verxina appears as a character in the Japanese multimedia franchise Umamusume: Pretty Derby, voiced by Kaya Okuno. She is depicted as the confident older sister of Vivlos and Cheval Grand who has a fondness for baseball, likely in reference to her real-life owner, Kazuhiro Sasaki. She wants to set a good example for her younger siblings by becoming the "queen" of the racing world, but despite being a highly talented racer with a wealthy upbringing, she is constantly bested by her rival, Gentildonna, and consequently feels disheartened by the number two.

== Racing form ==
Verxina won five races and placed in another seven out of 21 starts. This data is available on JBIS and netkeiba.

Date	Age	Track	Race	Grade	Distance (Condition)	Entry	HN	Odds (Favored)	Finish	Time	Margins	Jockey	Winner (Runner-up)
Aug 28, 2011	2	Sapporo	2yo Newcomer		1,800 m (Firm)	11	5	2.6 (1)	1st	1:55.2	–0.2	Yuichi Fukunaga	(Golden Crow)
Nov 13, 2011	2	Kyoto	Kigiku Sho	ALW (1W)	1,800 m (Firm)	10	6	2.8 (1)	3rd	1:47.6	0.1	Yuichi Fukunaga	Brightline
Dec 11, 2011	2	Hanshin	Erica Sho	ALW (1W)	2,000 m (Firm)	10	2	4.7 (3)	1st	2:04.1	0.0	Ioritz Mendizabal	(Tagano Rayonner)
Feb 11, 2012	3	Tokyo	Queen Cup	3	1,600 m (Firm)	16	9	4.7 (2)	1st	1:36.6	–0.2	Yasunari Iwata	(Ichiokuno Hoshi)
Apr 8, 2012	3	Hanshin	Oka Sho	1	1,600 m (Firm)	18	15	10.2 (4)	2nd	1:34.7	0.1	Hiroyuki Uchida	Gentildonna
May 20, 2012	3	Tokyo	Yushun Himba	1	2,400 m (Firm)	18	9	3.6 (2)	2nd	2:24.4	0.8	Hiroyuki Uchida	Gentildonna
Sep 16, 2012	3	Hanshin	Rose Stakes	2	1,800 m (Firm)	10	7	3.8 (2)	2nd	1:47.0	0.2	Hiroyuki Uchida	Gentildonna
Oct 14, 2012	3	Kyoto	Shuka Sho	1	2,000 m (Firm)	18	1	6.1 (2)	2nd	2:00.4	0.0	Hiroyuki Uchida	Gentildonna
Nov 11, 2012	3	Kyoto	Queen Elizabeth II Cup	1	2,200 m (Soft)	16	12	1.9 (1)	2nd	2:16.3	0.0	Hiroyuki Uchida	Rainbow Dahlia
Mar 31, 2013	4	Hanshin	Sankei Osaka Hai	2	2,000 m (Firm)	14	14	10.6 (4)	6th	1:59.8	0.8	Hiroyuki Uchida	Orfevre
May 12, 2013	4	Tokyo	Victoria Mile	1	1,600 m (Firm)	18	11	3.1 (1)	1st	1:32.4	0.0	Hiroyuki Uchida	(Whale Capture)
Jun 2, 2013	4	Tokyo	Yasuda Kinen	1	1,600 m (Firm)	18	15	20.0 (7)	8th	1:32.0	0.5	Craig Williams	Lord Kanaloa
Oct 6, 2013	4	Kyoto	Kyoto Daishoten	2	2,400 m (Firm)	13	8	21.7 (3)	8th	2:23.5	0.6	Yasunari Iwata	Hit the Target
Nov 10, 2013	4	Kyoto	Queen Elizabeth II Cup	1	2,200 m (Soft)	18	9	3.3 (1)	10th	2:17.2	0.6	Yasunari Iwata	Meisho Mambo
Nov 24, 2013	4	Tokyo	Japan Cup	1	2,400 m (Firm)	17	1	49.3 (9)	7th	2:26.3	0.2	Yasunari Iwata	Gentildonna
Feb 17, 2014	5	Tokyo	Tokyo Shimbun Hai	3	1,600 m (Soft)	14	15	20.6 (9)	11th	1:34.4	0.2	Hiroyuki Uchida	Whale Capture
Apr 12, 2014	5	Hanshin	Hanshin Himba Stakes	2	1,400 m (Firm)	13	7	12.2 (5)	11th	1:20.8	0.5	Hiroyuki Uchida	Smart Layer
May 18, 2014	5	Tokyo	Victoria Mile	1	1,600 m (Firm)	18	14	28.3 (11)	1st	1:32.3	–0.1	Hiroyuki Uchida	(Meisho Mambo)
Jun 29, 2014	5	Hanshin	Takarazuka Kinen	1	2,200 m (Firm)	12	3	35.6 (8)	3rd	2:14.6	0.7	Yuichi Fukunaga	Gold Ship
Nov 16, 2014	5	Kyoto	Queen Elizabeth II Cup	1	2,200 m (Firm)	18	10	18.3 (7)	11th	2:13.2	0.9	Hiroyuki Uchida	Lachesis
Dec 28, 2014	5	Nakayama	Arima Kinen	1	2,500 m (Firm)	16	2	77.7 (12)	14th	2:36.1	0.8	Hiroyuki Uchida	Gentildonna

Legend:
Turf

== Pedigree ==
Pedigree of Verxina (JPN), black mare 2013
Sire Deep Impact (JPN) 2002	Sunday Silence (USA); 1986	Halo	Hail to Reason
Sire Deep Impact (JPN) 2002	Sunday Silence (USA); 1986	Halo	Cosmah
Sire Deep Impact (JPN) 2002	Sunday Silence (USA); 1986	Wishing Well	Understanding
Sire Deep Impact (JPN) 2002	Sunday Silence (USA); 1986	Wishing Well	Mountain Flower
Sire Deep Impact (JPN) 2002	Wind in Her Hair (IRE); 1991	Alzao (USA)	Lyphard
Sire Deep Impact (JPN) 2002	Wind in Her Hair (IRE); 1991	Alzao (USA)	Lady Rebecca (GB)
Sire Deep Impact (JPN) 2002	Wind in Her Hair (IRE); 1991	Burghclere (GB)	Busted
Sire Deep Impact (JPN) 2002	Wind in Her Hair (IRE); 1991	Burghclere (GB)	Highclere
Dam Halwa Sweet (JPN) 2001	Machiavellian (USA); 1987	Mr. Prospector	Raise a Native
Dam Halwa Sweet (JPN) 2001	Machiavellian (USA); 1987	Mr. Prospector	Gold Digger
Dam Halwa Sweet (JPN) 2001	Machiavellian (USA); 1987	Coup de Folie	Halo
Dam Halwa Sweet (JPN) 2001	Machiavellian (USA); 1987	Coup de Folie	Raise The Standard (CAN)
Dam Halwa Sweet (JPN) 2001	Halwa Song (USA); 1996	Nureyev	Northern Dancer (CAN)
Dam Halwa Sweet (JPN) 2001	Halwa Song (USA); 1996	Nureyev	Special
Dam Halwa Sweet (JPN) 2001	Halwa Song (USA); 1996	Morn of Song	Blushing Groom (FR)
Dam Halwa Sweet (JPN) 2001	Halwa Song (USA); 1996	Morn of Song	Glorious Song (CAN)
