= Kazuhiro Sasaki =

Japanese baseball player (born 1968)

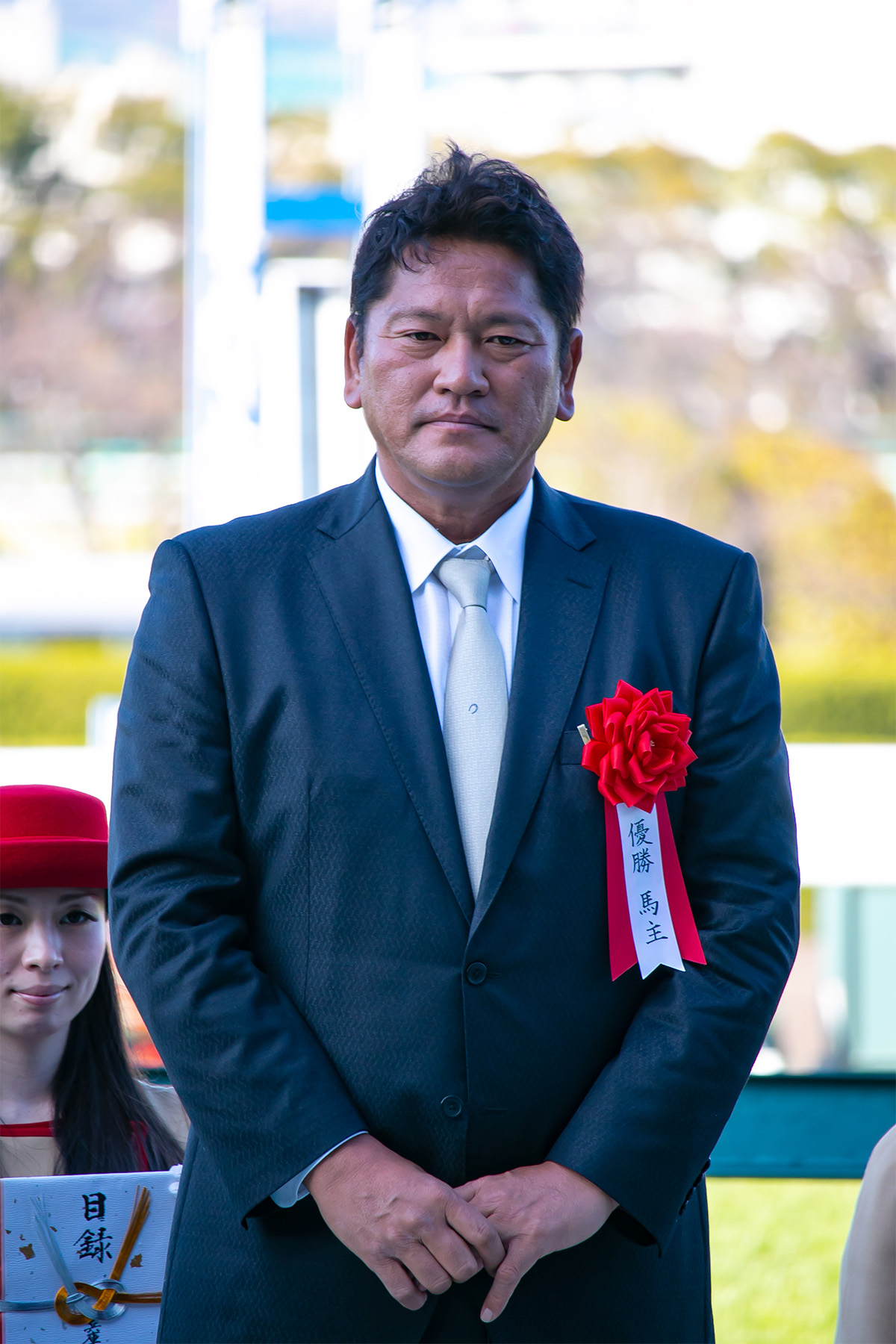
- Sasaki at the Hanshin Daishoten ceremony in 2016
- Pitcher
- Born: February 22, 1968 (age 58); Sendai City, Japan
- Batted: Right Threw: Right

Professional debut
- NPB: April 7, 1990, for the Yokohama Taiyō Whales
- MLB: April 5, 2000, for the Seattle Mariners

Last appearance
- MLB: September 28, 2003, for the Seattle Mariners
- NPB: August 9, 2005, for the Yokohama BayStars

NPB statistics
- Win–loss record: 43–38
- Earned run average: 2.41
- Strikeouts: 851
- Saves: 252

MLB statistics
- Win–loss record: 7–16
- Earned run average: 3.14
- Strikeouts: 242
- Saves: 129
- Stats at Baseball Reference

Teams
- Yokohama Taiyō Whales / Yokohama BayStars (1990–1999); Seattle Mariners (2000–2003); Yokohama BayStars (2004–2005)

Career highlights and awards
- NPB: Central League MVP (1998); MLB: 2× All-Star (2001, 2002); AL Rookie of the Year (2000)

Member of the Japanese

Baseball Hall of Fame
- Induction: 2014

Kazuhiro Sasaki (佐々木 主浩 Sasaki Kazuhiro, born February 22, 1968) is a Japanese former professional baseball relief pitcher. He played his entire Nippon Professional Baseball (NPB) career with the Yokohama Taiyō Whales / Yokohama BayStars (1990–1999; 2004–2005), and played his entire Major League Baseball (MLB) career with the Seattle Mariners (2000–2003). His nickname "Daimajin" was named after the tokusatsu character of the same name, and Sasaki has participated in advertisements and several collaborations with the franchise.

== Professional career ==
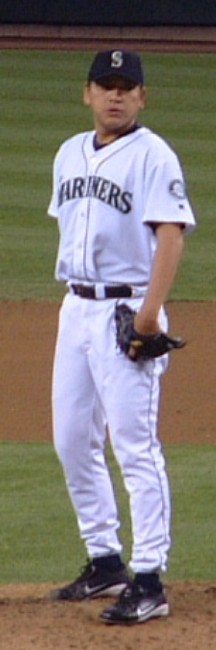
Sasaki with the Seattle Mariners in 2002

After playing college baseball for Tohoku Fukushi University, Sasaki was drafted in the first round of the 1989 draft by the Yokohama Taiyō Whales (now named Yokohama DeNA BayStars) in Japan's Central League. He played for them from 1990 to 1999, before joining the Seattle Mariners in 2000, on a 2-year, $9 million contract with a club option for 2002. He joined a bullpen that had been one of the worst in the major leagues, and during his rookie year won the closer job from a floundering José Mesa. Sasaki's out pitch, a devastating split-finger fastball that drops when arriving at home plate, was nicknamed "The Thang" by Mariners radio announcers. He complemented it with a four-seam fastball that topped out at mid-90s. Sasaki maintained a rigorous throwing program, sometimes at odds with club management, that saw him throw up to 100 pitches following games in which he did not appear.

Sasaki's transition to American baseball began with his being named American League Rookie of the Year, in a season where had 3.16 ERA in 63 games with 37 saves. For the next three years, along with Jeff Nelson and Arthur Rhodes, Sasaki was an integral member of the back of Seattle's bullpen. In 2001, Sasaki had 45 saves, with 3.24 ERA in 69 games, and earned his first All-Star nod, as well as received down-ballot MVP votes. The 2002 season was to be his final season before free agency, but Sasaki instead signed an extension that kept him under contract until 2004, with a 2005 club option. In that year, Sasaki again made the All-Star team, pitching in 61 games, with a 2.52 ERA and 37 saves. In what would be his final MLB season, the 2003 season was a struggle for Sasaki, as he appeared in only 35 games, while dealing with injuries to his lower back and ribcage, he had a career-worst 4.05 ERA and only 10 saves. Following that season, he decided to leave the Mariners before the last year of his contract in 2004, giving up $8 million, citing his desire to be with his family in Japan. According to the Seattle Post-Intelligencer, however, Sasaki's real reason for returning to Japan was pressure from ownership, due to his "indiscreet philandering".

Sasaki resumed his career with the BayStars upon returning to Japan, where he pitched for another year. But in his second year back, nagging knee and elbow injuries resulted in his release from Yokohama and subsequent retirement. His last official appearance came as a cameo against the Yomiuri Giants on August 9, 2005, as he struck out his longtime friend and rival Kazuhiro Kiyohara in a game played at Fullcast Stadium Miyagi in his hometown.

In addition to his Rookie of the Year award, Sasaki set several records for Japanese players, including saves (45) and save opportunities (46) for a single season in 1998; he was twice selected to play in the MLB All-Star game, and was selected to eight All-Star teams in Japan. Sasaki's 37 saves in his rookie season with the Mariners was an MLBrecord for saves by a rookie, until Neftalí Feliz broke it in 2010 with 40.

== Personal life ==
Sasaki and his first wife, former idol singer Kaori Shimizu, had two children. After returning to Japan in 2005, Sasaki continued his affair with actress Kanako Enomoto, who was 13 years his junior. Shimizu and Sasaki divorced in 2005. Enomoto gave birth in April 2005, and Sasaki and Enomoto married in 2005. Enomoto gave birth to another child in 2006.

Sasaki's interest in sports extends outside baseball. In 2002 and 2003, he lent his name to a team in Formula Nippon, an auto racing series in Japan. His Team 22 won two races in that time. He is currently the general representative of D'Station Racing in the Super GT series.

Sasaki is also a successful race horse owner, with many of his horses being foals of Halwa Sweet. Notable horses Sasaki has owned include Verxina, named by Enomoto, who won the Victoria Mile twice, Vivlos, winner of the Shūka Sho and of the 2017 Dubai Turf race on Dubai World Cup Night, and Cheval Grand, winner of the 2017 Japan Cup.

Sasaki has appeared as a judge on the Iron Chef television program. He had a side recording career, with an album of his vocals over techno beats.

Sasaki chose 22 for his uniform number because he was born at 2:22 on February 22 (2/22). The BayStars have permanently honored his number.

== See also ==
- List of Major League Baseball single-inning strikeout leaders
