= Victoria Mile =

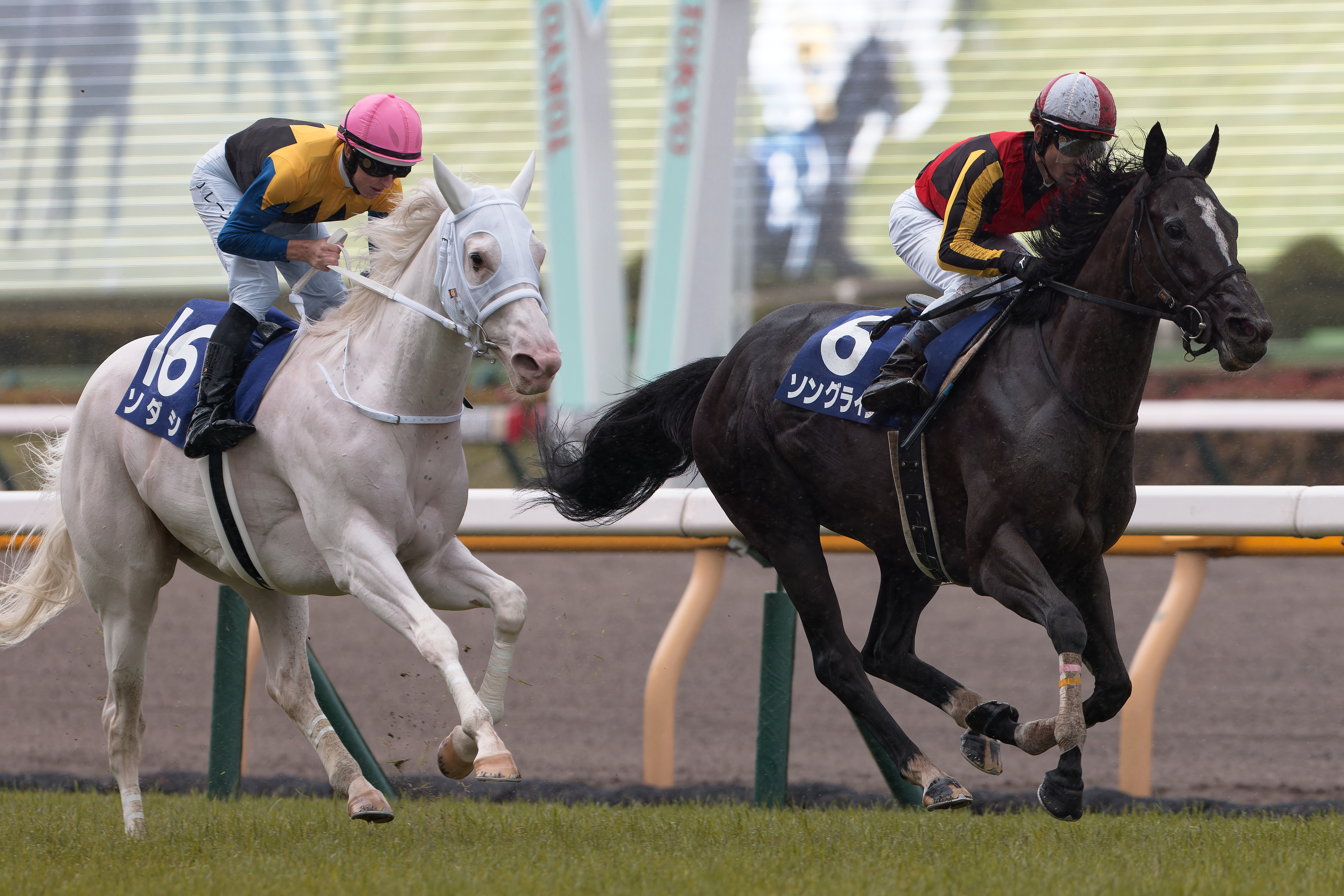
- Songline winning the 2023 race. Sodashi (left) was the winner of the 2022 race.
- Class: Grade 1
- Location: Tokyo Racecourse, Fuchu, Tokyo, Tokyo, Japan
- Inaugurated: May 14, 2006
- Race type: Thoroughbred
- Website: japanracing.jp/

Race information
- Distance: 1600 meters (About 8 furlongs / 1 mile)
- Surface: Turf
- Track: Left-handed
- Qualification: 4-y-o & Up, Fillies & Mares only, Thoroughbreds
- Weight: 56 kg
- Purse: ¥ 281,300,000 (as of 2025): 1st: ¥ 130,000,000; 2nd: ¥ 52,000,000; 3rd: ¥ 33,000,000

The Victoria Mile (ヴィクトリアマイル (Vikutoria Mairu)) is a Grade 1 flat horse race in Japan for four-year-old and above thoroughbred fillies and mares. Organized by Japan Racing Association, it is run over a distance of 1,600 metres (approximately 1 mile) on the turf at Tokyo Racecourse in May.

The race's name, "Victoria", comes from the Roman goddess of victory.

== History ==
Traditionally, mares, the foundation of racehorse breeding, were thought to be retired early and returned to the breeding industry, and for a long time, there were no races designated as targets for older mares.

Subsequently, in 1996, the conditions for the Queen Elizabeth II Cup were changed, and it became a Grade 1 race for three-year-old and up fillies and mares. Since then, efforts have been made to improve the racing program, including the addition of more graded stakes races for older fillies and mares, and the streamlining of race schedules, resulting in more fillies and mares having long and successful racing careers.

The fact that excellent offspring are now being born from mares that have had long and successful careers has led to a change in thinking within the breeding industry, and there has also been a growing emphasis on the value of mares as racehorses in Europe.

Following this trend, the Victoria Mile was established in 2006 as a spring championship race for four-year-old and up fillies and mares, and designated as Grade 1.

However, there were opposing opinions within the Japan Racing Association regarding the establishment of this race, such as "In order to improve the level of domestically bred racehorses, strong fillies should retire early and become broodmares. If they participate in races, they will get injured."

Since its establishment, the race has been an international competition, allowing foreign horses to participate, and horses belonging to National Association of Racing (NAR) that have achieved the required results in preparatory races are also eligible to participate.

Since 2017, the top three finishers in this race have been granted priority entry into the Prix Jacques Le Marois (Group 1) held in the same year.

Since 2018, the race has partnered with the Prix Jacques Le Marois under the name "Destination France" alongside the Yasuda Kinen.

Since 2020, it has been designated as a Breeders' Cup Challenge race, and the winning horse is granted priority entry into the Breeders' Cup Filly & Mare Turf (Grade 1) of that year, as well as the privilege of having a portion of the entry fee and transportation costs covered.

Since 2021, the Prix du Moulin de Longchamp (Group 1) was also added as a target race of "Destination France", and the top three finishers are granted priority entry.

== Trial races ==
Trial races provide automatic berths to the winning horses.

Race	Grade	Racecourse	Distance	Condition
Hanshin Himba Stakes	GII	Hanshin	1,600 metres	Winner
Fukushima Himba Stakes	GIII	Fukushima	1,800 metres	Winner

== Winners ==
Year	Winner	Age	Jockey	Trainer	Owner	Time
2006	Dance in the Mood	5	Hiroshi Kitamura	Kazuo Fujisawa	Shadai Race Horse	1:34.0
2007	Koiuta	4	Masami Matsuoka	Masashi Okuhira	Maekawa Kikaku	1:32.5
2008	Asian Winds	4	Shinji Fujita	Hideaki Fujiwara	Yoshimi Ota	1:33.7
2009	Vodka	5	Yutaka Take	Katsuhiko Sumii	Yuzo Tanimizu	1:32.4
2010	Buena Vista	4	Norihiro Yokoyama	Hiroyoshi Matsuda	Sunday Racing	1:32.4
2011	Apapane	4	Masayoshi Ebina	Sakae Kunieda	Kaneko Makoto Holdings	1:31.9
2012	Whale Capture	4	Norihiro Yokoyama	Kiyotaka Tanaka	Ken Shimada	1:32.4
2013	Verxina	4	Hiroyuki Uchida	Yasuo Tomomichi	Kazuhiro Sasaki	1:32.4
2014	Verxina	5	Hiroyuki Uchida	Yasuo Tomomichi	Kazuhiro Sasaki	1:32.3
2015	Straight Girl	6	Keita Tosaki	Hideaki Fujiwara	Toshihiro Hirosaki	1:31.9
2016	Straight Girl	7	Keita Tosaki	Hideaki Fujiwara	Toshihiro Hirosaki	1:31.5
2017	Admire Lead	4	Christophe Lemaire	Naosuke Sugai	Riichi Kondo	1:33.9
2018	Jour Polaire	5	Hideaki Miyuki	Masato Nishizono	G1 Racing	1:32.3
2019	Normcore	4	Damian Lane	Kiyoshi Hagiwara	Seiichi Iketani	1:30.5
2020	Almond Eye	5	Christophe Lemaire	Sakae Kunieda	Silk Racing	1:30.6
2021	Gran Alegria	5	Christophe Lemaire	Kazuo Fujisawa	Sunday Racing	1:31.0
2022	Sodashi	4	Hayato Yoshida	Naosuke Sugai	Kaneko Makoto Holdings	1:32.2
2023	Songline	5	Keita Tosaki	Toru Hayashi	Sunday Racing	1:32.2
2024	Ten Happy Rose	6	Akihide Tsumura	Daisuke Takayanagi	Yasushi Tenpaku	1:31.8
2025	Ascoli Piceno	4	Christophe Lemaire	Yoichi Kuroiwa	Sunday Racing	1:32.1
2026	Embroidery	4	Christophe Lemaire	Kazutomo Mori	Silk Racing	1:30.9

Speed Record

- Normcore (2019) = 1:30.5

== See also ==
- Horse racing in Japan
- List of Japanese flat horse races
