= Queen Elizabeth II Cup (Japan) =

Queen Elizabeth II Cup エリザベス女王杯
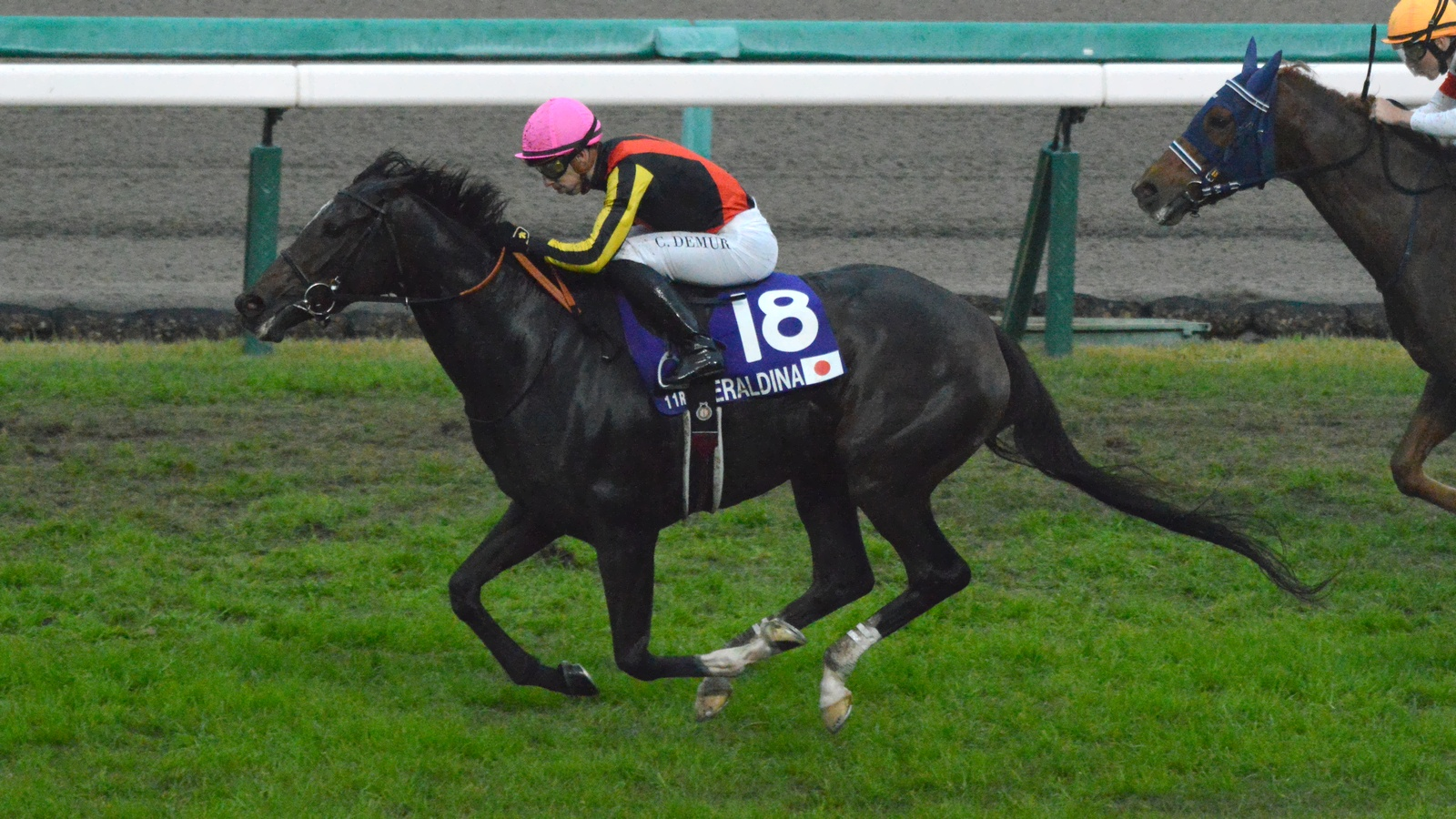
- 2022 Queen Elizabeth II Cup winner Geraldina
- Class: Grade 1
- Location: Kyoto Racecourse, Fushimi-ku, Kyoto, Kyoto Prefecture
- Inaugurated: November 21, 1976
- Race type: Thoroughbred
- Website: japanracing.jp/

Race information
- Distance: 2200 meters (About 11 furlongs / 1 3/8 miles)
- Surface: Turf
- Track: Right-handed
- Qualification: 3-y-o & Up, Fillies & Mares only, Thoroughbreds
- Weight: 3-y-o 54 kg \ 4-y-o & up 56 kg
- Purse: ¥ 281,300,000 (as of 2025): 1st: ¥ 130,000,000; 2nd: ¥ 52,000,000; 3rd: ¥ 33,000,000

The Queen Elizabeth II Cup (Queen Elizabeth II Commemorative Cup until 2012) is an International Grade 1 flat horse race in Japan for three-year-old and above thoroughbred fillies and mares run over a distance of 2,200 metres (approximately 1 mile 3 furlongs) on the turf at Kyoto Racecourse in November.

Originally called the Victoria Cup, it was renamed the Queen Elizabeth II Cup in 1975 to commemorate the visit of Elizabeth II to Japan.

== History ==
The race was first run in 1976 over a distance of 2,400 metres (1 mile 4 furlongs). It was originally for three-year-old fillies only and was the third leg of the Japanese Triple Tiara. In 1996, it was opened to older female horses and was reduced to its present distance. In the same year the Shūka Shō was established and became the third leg of the Triple Tiara. As a result, Mejiro Ramonu is the only racehorse to win the Triple Tiara with the Queen Elizabeth II Cup as the third leg.

Since 1999, the Queen Elizabeth II Cup has been opened for international racehorses, and then it was designated as an International Grade 1 race in 2007, with Irish-bred Snow Fairy being the first winner from outside Japan in 2010. The following year, she made Japanese flat racing history of being the first ever non-Japanese trained horse to win the same Grade 1 flat race back-to-back (second ever including Steeplechase, with Karasi winning Nakayama Grand Jump between 2005 and 2007).

It is the only Grade 1 race that is restricted to fillies and mares aged three or above. The other Grade 1 races for older female horses in Japan, the Victoria Mile, excludes three-year-olds.

== Trial races ==
Trial races provide automatic berths to the winning horses.

Race	Grade	Racecourse	Distance	Condition
Ireland Trophy	GII	Tokyo	1,800 metres	Winner

== Records ==
Speed record (since 1996 when distance reduced):

- Regaleira (2025) – 2:11.0

Most successful horse (2 wins):

- Mejiro Dober – 1998, 1999
- Admire Groove – 2003, 2004
- Snow Fairy – 2010, 2011
- Lucky Lilac – 2019, 2020

== Winners ==
Year	Winner	Age	Jockey	Trainer	Owner	Time
1976	Diamante	3	Yukiharu Matsuda	Yukio Inaba	Hiroyoshi Sato	2:28.5
1977	Inter Gloria	3	Yoichi Fukunaga	Tsugio Yanagida	Masao Matsuoka	2:28.7
1978	Lead Swallow	3	Kunihiko Take	Masatoshi Hattori	Yoshio Kumamoto	2:29.1
1979	Miss Kaburaya	3	Yukio Okabe	Tokachi Nishizuka	Kaburaya	2:32.6
1980	Hagino Top Lady	3	Kiyoaki Ito	Shuji Ito	Kokichi Hinokuma	2:27.9
1981	Agnes Tesco	3	Katsuichi Nishiura	Michio Kubo	Takao Watanabe	2:28.1
1982	Victoria Crown	3	Isao Shimada	Yukio Inaba	Masahi Iida	2:29.2
1983	Long Grace	3	Hiroshi Kawachi	Minoru Kobayashi	Choichi Nakai	2:30.1
1984	Kyowa Thunder	3	Hiroshi Higuchi	Hachiro Yoshioka	Yoshio Asakawa	2:28.4
1985	Reward Wing	3	Kunio Uchida	Akio Tsurudome	Tadahiko Miyazaki	2:26.8
1986	Mejiro Ramonu	3	Hiroshi Kawachi	Shinji Okuhira	Mejiro Bokujo	2:29.1
1987	Talented Girl	3	Seiji Ebisawa	Hironori Kurita	Masako Iida	2:29.3
1988	Miyama Poppy	3	Yukiharu Matsuda	Yoshitaro Matsuda	Ryogo Omiya	2:27.2
1989	Sand Peeress	3	Shigehiko Kishi	Shinobu Yoshioka	Hidaka Breeders Union	2:28.8
1990	Kyoei Tap	3	Norihiro Yokoyama	Kenji Hieda	Masao Matsuoka	2:25.5
1991	Rinden Lilly	3	Junichiro Oka	Akira Nomoto	Akitoshi Hayashida	2:29.6
1992	Takeno Velvet	3	Shinji Fujita	Minoru Kobayashi	Daikichi Takeoka	2:27.1
1993	Hokuto Vega	3	Kazuhiro Kato	Takao Nakano	Kanamorimori Shoji	2:24.9
1994	Hishi Amazon	3	Eiji Nakadate	Takao Nakano	Masaichiro Abe	2:24.3
1995	Sakura Candle	3	Futoshi Kojima	Kazunori Sakai	Sakura Commerce	2:27.3
1996	Dance Partner	4	Hirofumi Shii	Toshiaki Shirai	Katsumi Yoshida	2:14.3
1997	Erimo Chic	4	Hitoshi Matoba	Yoshio Oki	Shinichi Yamamoto	2:12.5
1998	Mejiro Dober	4	Yutaka Yoshida	Yokichi Okubo	Mejiro Shoji	2:12.8
1999	Mejiro Dober	5	Yutaka Yoshida	Yokichi Okubo	Mejiro Shoji	2:13.5
2000	Phalaenopsis	5	Mikio Matsunaga	Mitsumasa Hamada	North Hills Management Co Ltd	2:12.8
2001	To the Victory	5	Yutaka Take	Yasuo Ikee	Makoto Kaneko	2:11.2
2002	Fine Motion	3	Yutaka Take	Yuji Ito	Tatsuo Fushikida	2:13.2
2003	Admire Groove	3	Yutaka Take	Mitsuru Hashida	Riichi Kondo	2:11.8
2004	Admire Groove	4	Yutaka Take	Mitsuru Hashida	Riichi Kondo	2:13.6
2005	Sweep Tosho	4	Kenichi Ikezoe	Akio Tsurudome	Tosho Sangyo	2:12.5
2006	Fusaichi Pandora ^{[a]}	3	Yuichi Fukunaga	Toshiaki Shirai	Fusao Sekiguchi	2:11.6
2007	Daiwa Scarlet	3	Katsumi Ando	Kunihide Matsuda	Keizo Oshiro	2:11.9
2008	Little Amapola	3	Christophe Lemaire	Hiroyuki Nagahama	Shadai Racehorse Co	2:12.1
2009	Queen Spumante	5	Hiroyasu Tanaka	Shigeyuki Kojima	Green Farm	2:13.6
2010	Snow Fairy	3	Ryan Moore	Ed Dunlop	Anamoine Ltd	2:12.5
2011	Snow Fairy	4	Ryan Moore	Ed Dunlop	Anamoine Ltd	2:11.6
2012	Rainbow Dahlia	5	Yoshitomi Shibata	Yoshitaka Ninomiya	Yoshiko Tanaka	2:16.3
2013	Meisho Mambo	3	Koshiro Take	Akihiro Iida	Yoshio Matsumoto	2:16.6
2014	Lachesis	4	Yuga Kawada	Katsuhiko Sumii	Masaya Oshima	2:12.3
2015	Marialite	4	Masayoshi Ebina	Takashi Kubota	U Carrot Farm	2:14.9
2016	Queens Ring	4	Mirco Demuro	Keiji Yoshimura	Chizu Yoshida	2:12.9
2017	Mozu Katchan	3	Mirco Demuro	Ippo Sameshima	Capital System Co. Ltd	2:14.3
2018	Lys Gracieux	4	João Moreira	Yoshito Yahagi	U Carrot Farm	2:13.1
2019	Lucky Lilac	4	Christophe Soumillon	Mikio Matsunaga	Sunday Racing	2:14.1
2020	Lucky Lilac ^{[b]}	5	Christophe Lemaire	Mikio Matsunaga	Sunday Racing	2:10.3
2021	Akai Ito ^{[b]}	4	Hideaki Miyuki	Kazuya Nakatake	Koji Oka	2:12.1
2022	Geraldina ^{[b]}	4	Cristian Demuro	Takashi Saito	Sunday Racing	2:13.0
2023	Brede Weg	3	Christophe Lemaire	Keisuke Miyata	Sunday Racing	2:12.6
2024	Stunning Rose	5	Cristian Demuro	Tomokazu Takano	Sunday Racing	2:11.1
2025	Regaleira	4	Keita Tosaki	Tetsuya Kimura	Sunday Racing	2:11.0
2026	Laughterlines	3	Yutaka Take	Michihiro Ogasa	Sunday Racing	2:14.7

^{a} Kawakami Princess finished first in 2006 but was demoted to 12th place following a Stewards' Inquiry.

^{b} The 2020, 2021 and 2022 races took place at Hanshin Racecourse over a distance of 2200 metres.

== See also ==
- Horse racing in Japan
- List of Japanese flat horse races
