= Koshiro Take =

Japanese ex-jockey and horse trainer

Koshiro Take 武幸四郎
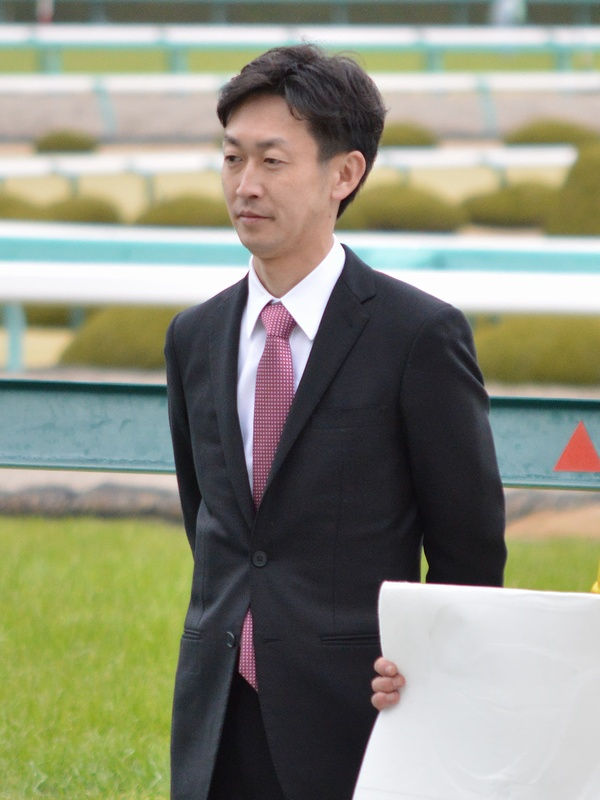

Personal information
- Nationality: Japanese
- Born: November 3, 1978 (age 47) Rittō, Shiga
- Occupations: Trainer; Jockey (former)
- Height: 177 cm (5 ft 10 in)
- Weight: 52 kg (115 lb)

Horse racing career
- Sport: Horse racing

Koshiro Take (武 幸四郎, Take Kōshirō) (b. November 3, 1978, in Rittō, Shiga) is a Japanese trainer of Thoroughbred race horses and ex-jockey. He is the younger brother of Yutaka Take.

== Jockey career ==
Take debuted as a jockey in March 1, 1997 at the Hanshin Racecourse. The following day, he won his first race and also his first graded race at the same time, with him winning the Yomiuri Milers Cup while riding Osumi Tycoon, making him the fastest rookie to win a graded race.

He won his first Grade 1 race in 2000 when he won the Shuka Sho with Tico Tico Tac, but failed to win another Grade 1 race until his victory at the Kikuka Sho with Song of Wind, and wouldn't for another 7 when he won 3 Grade 1 races with Meisho Mambo.

== Trainer career ==
Take gained his trainer license in December of 2016, and as JRA rules do not allow jockeys to be trainers at the same time, he retired as a jockey in February of 2017. He worked under Kazuo Fujisawa for a year before opening his own stable at Ritto Training Center as a professional trainer in 2018.

He won his first race as a trainer on March 3, 2018; with his brother Yutaka riding Gouin at a maiden race.

== Major wins ==
Japan

- Kikuka Sho - (1) - Song of Wind (2006)
- NHK Mile Cup - (1) - Win Kluger (2003)
- Queen Elizabeth II Cup - (1) - Meisho Mambo (2013)
- Shuka Sho - (2 ) - Tico Tico Tac (2000), Meisho Mambo (2013)
- Yushun Himba - (1) - Meisho Mambo (2013)
