= Hanshin Himba Stakes =

Hanshin Himba Stakes 阪神牝馬ステークス
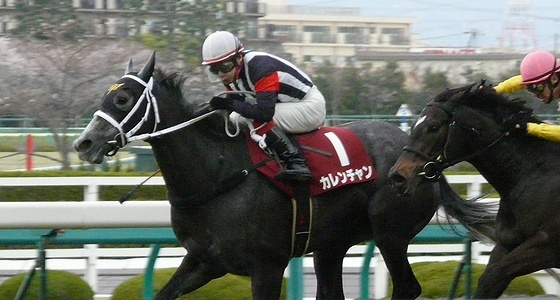
- 2011 Hanshin Himba Stakes winner Curren Chan
- Class: Grade 2
- Location: Hanshin Racecourse
- Race type: Thoroughbred Flat racing

Race information
- Distance: 1600 metres
- Surface: Turf
- Track: Right-handed
- Qualification: 4-y-o+ fillies & mares
- Weight: Special Weight
- Purse: ¥ 119,100,000 (as of 2025): 1st: ¥ 55,000,000; 2nd: ¥ 22,000,000; 3rd: ¥ 14,000,000

The Hanshin Himba Stakes (Japanese 阪神牝馬ステークス) is a Grade 2 flat horse race in Japan for Thoroughbreds fillies and mares of at least four years of age. It is run over a distance of 1600 metres at Hanshin Racecourse in April.

The Hanshin Himba Stakes was first run in 1958. It was elevated to Grade 3 status in 1984 and has been run as a grade 2 race since 1998. The race was contested over a variety of distances before being run over 2000 metres from 1968 until 1995. The distance was reduced to 1600 metres in 1996 and to 1400 metres in 2006. The race returned to 1600 metres in 2016.

Among the winners of the race have been Fine Motion, Admire Groove, Rhein Kraft, Curren Chan and Mikki Queen.

== Race details ==
The race is run on a right-handed (clockwise) at Hanshin Racecourse over a distance of 1,600 meters on turf using the outer curve.

=== Weight ===
55 kg for four-year-olds and above.

Allowances:

- 1 kg for southern hemisphere bred three-year-olds

Penalties:

- If a graded stakes race has been won within a year, 2 kg for a grade one win, 1 kg for a grade two win
- If a graded stakes race has been won for more than a year (excluding two-year-old race performance), 1 kg for a grade one win

== Winners since 2000 ==
Year	Winner	Age	Jockey	Trainer	Owner	Time
2000	To The Victory	4	Hirofumi Shii	Yasuo Ikee	Makoto Kaneko	1:33.8
2001	Air Thule	4	Mirco Demuro	Hideyuki Mori	Lucky Field	1:33.5
2002	Diamond Biko	4	Olivier Peslier	Kazuo Fujisawa	Shinobu Osako	1:33.2
2003	Fine Motion	4	Yutaka Take	Yuji Ito	Tatsuo Fushikida	1:33.4
2004	Heavenly Romance	4	Mikio Matsunaga	Shoji Yamamoto	North Hills Management	1:34.0
2005	Admire Groove	5	Yutaka Take	Mitsuru Hashida	Riichi Kondo	1:34.5
2006	Rhein Kraft	4	Yuichi Fukunaga	Tsutomo Setoguchi	Shigemasa Osawa	1:21.2
2007	Jolly Dance	4	Shinji Fujita	Noriyuki Hori	Kaoru Kobayashi	1:20.7
2008	Asian Winds	4	Ryota Sameshima	Hideaki Fujiwara	Yoshimi Ota	1:21.4
2009	Jolly Dance	6	Hirofumi Shii	Noriyuki Hori	Kaoru Kobayashi	1:21.4
2010	I Am Kamino Mago	4	Shinichiro Akiyama	Hiroyuki Nagahama	Koichi Hori	1:20.2
2011	Curren Chan	4	Kenichi Ikezoe	Takayuki Yasuda	Takashi Suzuki	1:20.4
2012	Queens Barn	4	Yusuke Fujioka	Hidekazu Asami	Masamichi Hayashi	1:21.9
2013	Sound of Heart	4	Kenichi Ikezoe	Yasuhisa Matsuyama	Turf Sport	1:21.4
2014	Smart Layer	4	Yutaka Take	Ryuji Okubo	Toru Okawa	1:20.3
2015	Cafe Brilliant	5	Yuichi Fukunaga	Noriyuki Hori	Koichi Nishikawa	1:21.1
2016	Smart Layer	6	Mirco Demuro	Ryuji Okubo	Toru Okawa	1:33.1
2017	Mikki Queen	4	Suguru Hamanaka	Yasutoshi Ikee	Mizuki Noda	1:34.3
2018	Miss Panthere	4	Norihiro Yokoyama	Mitsugu Kon	Chiyono Terada	1:34.8
2019	Mikki Charm	4	Yuga Kawada	Mitsumasa Nakauchida	Mizuki Noda	1:33.6
2020	Sound Chiara	5	Kohei Matsuyama	Akio Adachi	Yuichi Masuda	1:32.9
2021	Des Ailes	4	Yuga Kawada	Yasuo Tomomichi	Shadai Race Horse	1:32.0
2022	Meisho Mimosa	5	Katsuma Sameshima	Kaneo Ikezoe	Silk Racing	1:32.8
2023	Sound Vivace	4	Suguru Hamanaka	Daisuke Takayanagi	Yuichi Masuda	1:33.9
2024	Masked Diva	4	João Moreira	Yasuyuki Tsujino	Shadai Race Horse	1:33.0
2025	Safira	4	Kohei Matsuyama	Manabu Ikezoe	Silk Racing	1:32.8
2026	Embroidery	4	Christophe Lemaire	Kazutomo Mori	Silk Racing	1:31.6

== Earlier winners ==
- 1958 - Shiyunme
- 1959 - Miyajiri Yu
- 1960 - Queen Onward
- 1961 - Cupid
- 1962 - Yoshishio
- 1963 - Taitsubaki
- 1964 - Masuwaka
- 1965 - Sea Dragon
- 1966 - Miss Korea
- 1967 - Wakashio
- 1968 - Fine Rose
- 1969 - Rikiryu Shingeki
- 1970 - Shinstar
- 1971 - Taiyo Kotobuki
- 1972 - Katsuyayoi
- 1973 - Keiryu Shingeki
- 1974 - Lucky One
- 1975 - Green Fight
- 1976 - Mejiro Jizo
- 1977 - Inter Gloria
- 1978 - Urakawa Cherry
- 1979 - Silk Ski
- 1980 - Tamamo Kotobuki
- 1981 - Tanino Tesco
- 1982 - Miss Radical
- 1983 - Calston Tesco
- 1984 - Kikuno Pegasus
- 1985 - Global Dyna
- 1986 - Pot Tesco Lady
- 1987 - Shiyono Regal
- 1988 - Rikiai Northern
- 1989 - Louisiana Pit
- 1990 - Main Caster
- 1991 - Machino Komachi
- 1992 - Yusei Fairy
- 1993 - North Flight
- 1994 - Memory Jasper
- 1995 - Samani Beppin
- 1996 - Hishi Natalie
- 1997 - Air Wings
- 1998 - Egao O Misete
- 1999 - Hi Friend Code

== See also ==
- Horse racing in Japan
- List of Japanese flat horse races
