= Tayasu Tsuyoshi =

Japanese thoroughbred racehorse (b. 1992)

Tayasu Tsuyoshi タヤスツヨシ
- Tayasu Tsuyoshi at the 1995 Kikuka-shō.
- Breed: Thoroughbred
- Sire: Sunday Silence
- Grandsire: Halo
- Dam: Magaro
- Damsire: Caro
- Sex: Stallion
- Foaled: April 26, 1992
- Died: July 29, 2008 (aged 16)
- Country: Japan
- Colour: Dark bay
- Breeder: Shadai Farm
- Owner: Yokose Kanichi
- Racing colours
- Trainer: Akio Tsurudome
- Jockey: Sadahiro Kojima
- Record: 13:4-3-2
- Earnings: ¥297,436,000

Major wins
- Radio Tampa Hai Sansai Stakes (1994); Japanese Classic Race wins: Tokyo Yūshun (1995)
- Last updated on January 17, 2026

Tayasu Tsuyoshi (Japanese: タヤスツヨシ, Hepburn: Tayasu Tsuyoshi; April 26, 1992 - July 29, 2008) was a Japanese Thoroughbred racehorse, the winner of the 1995 Tokyo Yūshun, and a breeding stallion.

== Racing career ==
Tayasu Tsyoshi's first race was on August 7, 1994, at Sapporo, where he came in 3rd. He ran the debut once again and had a same result before switching to eventually his most common jockey, Sadahiro Kojima. This decision worked out for the team as he picked up his first win on September 25, 1994, at Chukyo Racecourse. The next race he joined was the Momiji Stakes at Hanshin Racecourse in which he lost to Fuji Kiseki by one and a quarter length behind. He then redeemed himself by winning the Erika Sho on December 3, 1994.

He won the biggest race of his career, by winning the 1994 Radio Tampa Hai Sansai Stakes and finishing it with a record time. He had a good showing at the 1995 Satsuki Shō, coming in 2nd. Then he won the biggest race of his career by winning the 1995 Tokyo Yūshun on May 28. His win in the Yushun sparked for the beginning of Sunday Silence dominance era to come as he and Genuine won two classics (Satsuki Shō, Tokyo Yūshun) whilst Dance Partner took the Oaks. He finished out his career quietly in 1995 with 5th and 7th place finishes at the Kobe Shimbun Hai and the Kyoto Shimbun Hai. His final race was on November 5, 1995, at the Kikuka-shō, where he came in 6th. He developed tendonitis after and was officially retired on July 27, 1996.

== Racing form ==
Tayasu Tsuyoshi won four races in 13 starts.

Date	Track	Race	Grade	Distance (Condition)	Entry	HN	Odds (Favored)	Finish	Time	Margins	Jockey	Winner (Runner-up)
1994 – two-year-old season
Aug 7	Sapporo	2yo Newcomer		1,200 m (Firm)	9	1	8.6 (3)	3rd	1:12.5	0.9	Hideo Koyauchi	Bright Sunday
Aug 14	Sapporo	2yo Newcomer		1,200 m (Soft)	11	1	4.3 (2)	3rd	1:14.2	0.5	Hideo Koyauchi	Meiner Norden
Sep 25	Chukyo	2yo Maiden		1,700 m (Good)	10	5	3.4 (2)	1st	1:46.2	–0.8	Sadahiro Kojima	(Yamanin Rival)
Oct 8	Hanshin	Momiji Stakes	OP	1,600 m (Firm)	9	8	10.3 (3)	2nd	1:35.7	0.2	Sadahiro Kojima	Fuji Kiseki
Dec 3	Hanshin	Erica Sho	ALW (1W)	2,000 m (Firm)	8	3	1.7 (1)	1st	2:04.2	–0.1	Sadahiro Kojima	(Erimo Amethyst)
Dec 24	Hanshin	Radio Tampa Hai Sansai Stakes	3	2,000 m (Firm)	11	7	2.7 (2)	1st	R2:03.4	0.0	Sadahiro Kojima	(Narita King O)
1995 – three-year-old season
Feb 12	Tokyo	Kyodo NS Hai Yonsai Stakes	3	1,800 m (Firm)	11	3	1.9 (1)	2nd	1:49.3	0.5	Yutaka Take	Narita King O
Mar 18	Nakayama	Wakaba Stakes	OP	2,000 m (Heavy)	8	1	2.0 (1)	5th	2:09.9	1.8	Sadahiro Kojima	Genuine
Apr 16	Nakayama	Satsuki Sho	1	2,000 m (Good)	16	7	8.1 (4)	2nd	2:02.6	0.1	Sadahiro Kojima	Genuine
May 28	Tokyo	Tokyo Yushun	1	2,400 m (Firm)	18	14	3.1 (1)	1st	2:27.3	–0.2	Sadahiro Kojima	(Genuine)
Sep 17	Kyoto	Kobe Shimbun Hai	2	2,000 m (Firm)	14	6	1.3 (1)	5th	2:00.5	0.3	Sadahiro Kojima	Tanino Create
Oct 15	Kyoto	Kyoto Shimbun Hai	2	2,200 m (Firm)	15	1	2.7 (1)	7th	2:12.1	0.7	Sadahiro Kojima	Narita King O
Nov 5	Kyoto	Kikuka Sho	1	3,000 m (Firm)	18	16	7.7 (5)	6th	3:05.3	0.9	Sadahiro Kojima	Mayano Top Gun

Legend:
Turf

- R on the time indicates that this was a record time

== Stud career and death ==
In 1996, Tayasu Tsuyoshi became a stud in Shadai Stallion Station before moving into Breeders Stallion Station back in 2005. He was also an active shuttle stud in Australia. One of his progeny who was bred in Australia, Jeram Special won the Selangor Gold Cup back in 2007. On the morning of July 29, 2008, He fell during grazing session and subsequently fractured his right femur. This injury was too severe and he was euthanized on the day. His grave located in the Breeders Stallion Station.

Tayasu Tsuyoshi's descendants include:

c = colt, f = filly, g = gelding

Foaled	Name	Sex	Major Wins
1997	Sunday Tsuyoshi	c	Santa Anita Trophy
1998	Nasdaq Power	c	Unicorn Stakes
1999	D S Thunder	c	Mercury Cup
2000	T K Tsuyoshi	c	Totsuka Kinen
2001	Hollow Bullet	f	VRC Oaks, Vinery Stud Stakes
2001	Jeram Special	g	Selangor Gold Cup
2003	Man of Purser	c	Derby Grand Prix
2003	B B Tornado	c	Tokyo Derby
2003	Desert Regina	c	Shirasagi Sho
2004	Top Sabaton	c	Haneda Hai
2005	Boku	c	Mile Grand Prix

== Pedigree ==
Pedigree of Tayasu Tsuyoshi (JPN), 1992
Sire Sunday Silence (USA) b. 1986	Halo (USA) b. 1969	Hail to Reason	Turn-To
Sire Sunday Silence (USA) b. 1986	Halo (USA) b. 1969	Hail to Reason	Nothirdchance
Sire Sunday Silence (USA) b. 1986	Halo (USA) b. 1969	Cosmah	Cosmic Bomb
Sire Sunday Silence (USA) b. 1986	Halo (USA) b. 1969	Cosmah	Almahmoud
Sire Sunday Silence (USA) b. 1986	Wishing Well (USA) b. 1975	Understanding	Promised Land
Sire Sunday Silence (USA) b. 1986	Wishing Well (USA) b. 1975	Understanding	Pretty Ways
Sire Sunday Silence (USA) b. 1986	Wishing Well (USA) b. 1975	Mountain Flower	Montparnasse
Sire Sunday Silence (USA) b. 1986	Wishing Well (USA) b. 1975	Mountain Flower	Edelweiss
Dam Magaro (USA) b. 1980	Caro (IRE) b. 1967	Fortino	Grey Sovereign
Dam Magaro (USA) b. 1980	Caro (IRE) b. 1967	Fortino	Ranavalo
Dam Magaro (USA) b. 1980	Caro (IRE) b. 1967	Chambordi	Chamossaire
Dam Magaro (USA) b. 1980	Caro (IRE) b. 1967	Chambordi	Life Hill
Dam Magaro (USA) b. 1980	Magic (USA) b. 1969	Buckpasser	Tom Fool
Dam Magaro (USA) b. 1980	Magic (USA) b. 1969	Buckpasser	Busanda
Dam Magaro (USA) b. 1980	Magic (USA) b. 1969	Aspidistra	Better Self
Dam Magaro (USA) b. 1980	Magic (USA) b. 1969	Aspidistra	Tilly Rose
