= Asian Winds =

Japanese Thoroughbred racehorse (2004–2025)

Asian Winds エイジアンウインズ
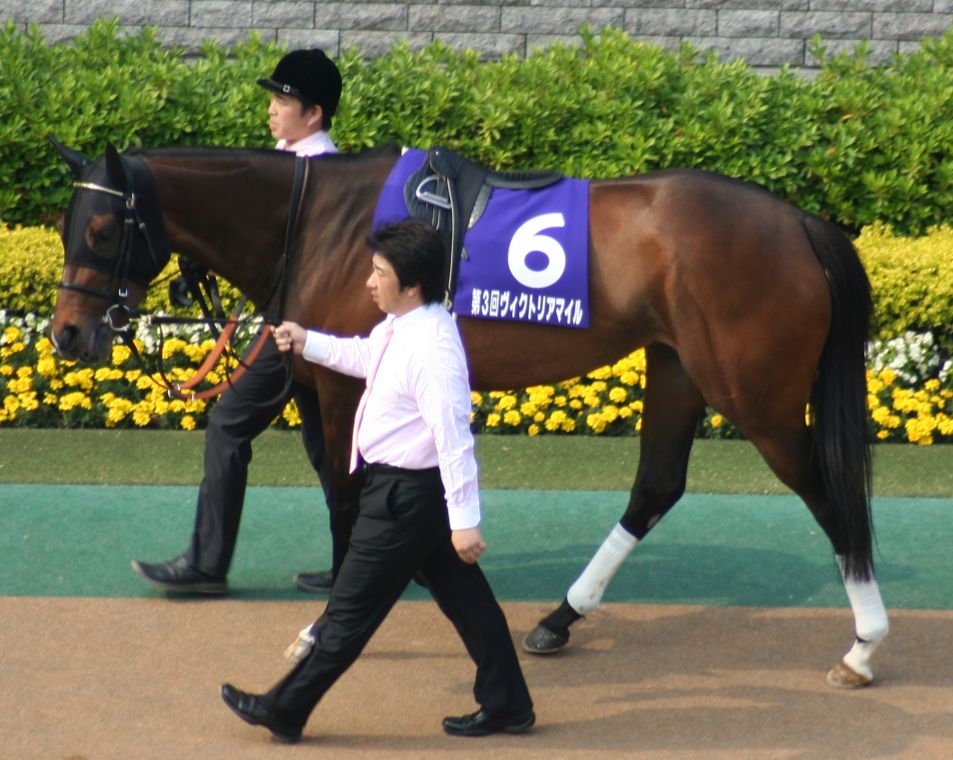
- Asian Winds after winning the 2008 Victoria Mile
- Sire: Fuji Kiseki
- Grandsire: Sunday Silence
- Dam: Sakurasaku II
- Damsire: Danehill
- Sex: Mare
- Foaled: 28 March 2004
- Died: 14 March 2025 (aged 20)
- Country: Japan
- Colour: Bay
- Breeder: Shadai Farm
- Owner: Yosimi Ota
- Racing colours
- Trainer: Hideaki Fujiwara
- Jockey: Christophe Lemaire; Ryota Sameshima; Shinji Fujita
- Record: 11: 6-2-2
- Earnings: ¥213,559,000

Major wins
- Hanshin Himba Stakes (2008); Victoria Mile (2008)

Asian Winds (Japanese: エイジアンウインズ, Hepburn: Eijian Uinzu; 28 March 2004 – 14 March 2025) was a Japanese Thoroughbred racehorse and broodmare. She competed from 2006 to 2008, recording six wins in eleven starts, including the Hanshin Himba Stakes and the Victoria Mile.

== Background ==
Asian Winds was a bay mare bred in Japan by Shadai Farm. She was sired by Fuji Kiseki, a son of Sunday Silence. Her dam, Sakurasaku II, was sired by Danehill. She was purchased by Yosimi Ota and trained by Hideaki Fujiwara. During her career, she was ridden by Christophe Lemaire, Ryota Sameshima, and Shinji Fujita.

== Racing career ==
Asian Winds debuted in December 2006 on the dirt track at Hanshin Racecourse, finishing third. She won her next two starts on the dirt in December 2006 and January 2007, followed by another dirt victory in March 2007.

In late 2007, she transitioned to turf racing. After a third-place finish on dirt and a second-place finish on turf, she won a turf allowance race at Chukyo in December 2007.

In 2008, she competed exclusively on turf. She won allowance races at Nakayama and Hanshin. In April, she contested the Hanshin Himba Stakes (GII), where she led from the start and finished first, ahead of Blumenblatt.

On May 18, 2008, she ran in the Victoria Mile (GI) at Tokyo Racecourse. Ridden by Shinji Fujita, she raced near the lead and won by a margin of 0.1 seconds, with Vodka finishing second. She was retired after this race due to a physical issue.

== Statistics ==
The following table details all 11 starts of Asian Winds's racing career based on official netkeiba race charts.

Date	Distance (Condition)	Race	Class	Course	Odds (Favourite)	Field	Finish	Time	Winning (Losing) Margin	Winner (2nd Place)	Jockey	Ref
2006 – two-year-old season
Dec 3	Dirt 1400 m (Good)	2-Y-O Maiden	Maiden	Hanshin	1.8 (3rd)	12	3rd	1:26.7	0.6	Shadow Stripe	Yuichi Fukunaga	
Dec 24	Dirt 1400 m (Good)	2-Y-O Maiden	Maiden	Hanshin	1.4 (1st)	15	1st	1:26.8	–0.8	(Yamanin Prologue)	Christophe Lemaire	
2007 – three-year-old season
Jan 21	Dirt 1400 m (Good)	1 Win Allowance	Allowance	Kyoto	2.5 (3rd)	13	3rd	1:25.7	0.3	Amano Cherry Run	Christophe Lemaire	
Mar 17	Dirt 1200 m (Good)	2 Win Allowance	Allowance	Hanshin	1.5 (1st)	12	1st	1:13.4	–0.2	(Towa Scat)	Yasunari Iwata	
Oct 27	Dirt 1400 m (Good to Soft)	3 Win Allowance	Allowance	Kyoto	6.5 (9th)	16	9th	1:25.7	1.0	Hana Ichirin	Yuichi Fukunaga	
Nov 18	Turf 1400 m (Good)	3 Win Allowance	Allowance	Kyoto	14.4 (2nd)	17	2nd	1:21.6	0.1	Shy na Musume	Christophe Lemaire	
Dec 1	Turf 1200 m (Good)	3 Win Allowance	Allowance	Chukyo	2.8 (1st)	18	1st	1:07.8	–0.3	(Spring Tapian)	Christophe Lemaire	
2008 – four-year-old season
Mar 1	Turf 1200 m (Good)	4 Win Allowance	Allowance	Nakayama	2.6 (2nd)	16	2nd	1:08.8	0.5	Western Venus	Norihiro Yokoyama	
Mar 30	Turf 1400 m (Good)	4 Win Allowance	Allowance	Hanshin	3.2 (1st)	18	1st	1:21.5	–0.1	(Meiner Polite)	Ryota Sameshima	
Apr 12	Turf 1400 m (Good)	Hanshin Himba Stakes	GII	Hanshin	8.8 (1st)	15	1st	1:21.4	0.0	(Blumenblatt)	Ryota Sameshima	
May 18	Turf 1600 m (Good)	Victoria Mile	GI	Tokyo	13.4 (5th)	18	1st	1:33.7	–0.1	(Vodka)	Shinji Fujita	

== Notable progeny ==
- 2024 crop
  - Jetson (colt, by Bricks and Mortar)
- 2023 crop
  - Furin Kazan (colt, by California Chrome)
- 2022 crop
  - Terminator (colt, by Rulership)
- 2021 crop
  - Jewel de Paris (colt, by Dance Director)
- 2019 crop
  - Wings of Love (gelding, by Rulership)
- 2018 crop
  - Mighty Treasure (filly, by Macfi)

== Pedigree ==
Pedigree of Asian Winds (JPN)
Sire Fuji Kiseki 1992	Sunday Silence; 1986	Halo	Hail to Reason
Sire Fuji Kiseki 1992	Sunday Silence; 1986	Halo	Cosmah
Sire Fuji Kiseki 1992	Sunday Silence; 1986	Wishing Well	Understanding
Sire Fuji Kiseki 1992	Sunday Silence; 1986	Wishing Well	Mountain Flower
Sire Fuji Kiseki 1992	Millracer; 1983	Le Fabuleux	Wild Risk
Sire Fuji Kiseki 1992	Millracer; 1983	Le Fabuleux	Anguar
Sire Fuji Kiseki 1992	Millracer; 1983	Marston's Mill	In Reality
Sire Fuji Kiseki 1992	Millracer; 1983	Marston's Mill	Millicent
Dam Sakurasaku II 1997	Danehill; 1986	Danzig	Northern Dancer
Dam Sakurasaku II 1997	Danehill; 1986	Danzig	Pas de Nom
Dam Sakurasaku II 1997	Danehill; 1986	Razyana	His Majesty
Dam Sakurasaku II 1997	Danehill; 1986	Razyana	Spring Adieu
Dam Sakurasaku II 1997	Sakura Fubuki; 1990	Forty Niner	Mr. Prospector
Dam Sakurasaku II 1997	Sakura Fubuki; 1990	Forty Niner	File
Dam Sakurasaku II 1997	Sakura Fubuki; 1990	Bound	Nijinsky
Dam Sakurasaku II 1997	Sakura Fubuki; 1990	Bound	Special

== See also ==
- Thoroughbred racing in Japan
- Victoria Mile
