= Genuine (horse) =

Japanese-bred Thoroughbred racehorse

Genuine ジェニュイン
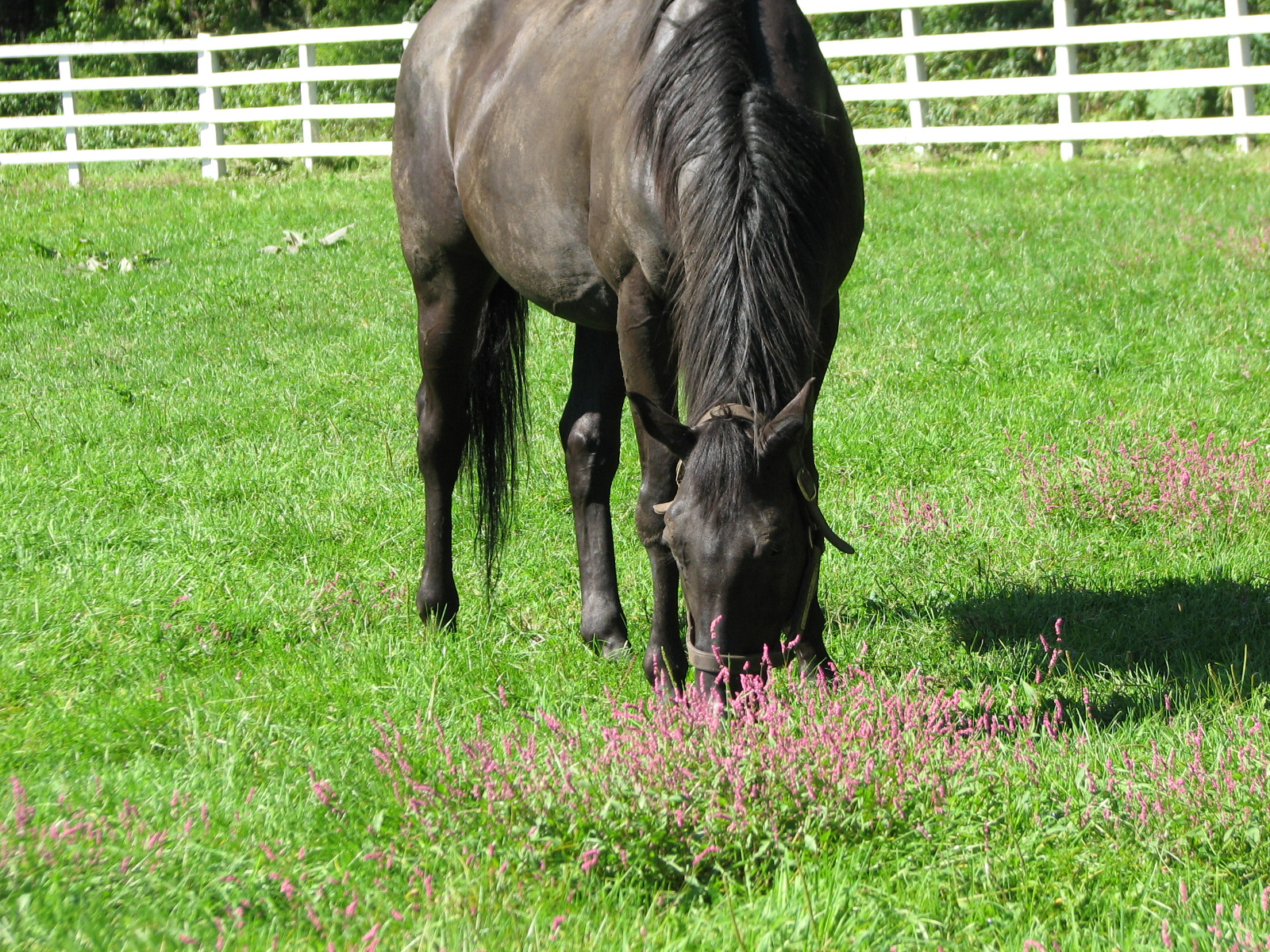
- Genuine in 2005
- Breed: Thoroughbred
- Sire: Sunday Silence (USA)
- Grandsire: Halo (USA)
- Dam: Croupier Lady (USA)
- Damsire: What Luck (USA)
- Sex: Stallion
- Foaled: April 28, 1992; Shadai Farm, Hokkaido, Japan
- Died: January 19, 2015 (aged 22); Shadai Farm, Hokkaido, Japan
- Country: Japan
- Colour: Brown
- Breeder: Shadai Farm
- Owner: Shadai Race Horse Co Ltd
- Racing colours
- Trainer: Yasuhisa Matsuyama
- Jockey: Yukio Okabe
- Record: 21: 5-7-1
- Earnings: ¥537,013,000

Major wins
- Mile Championship (1996); Japanese Classic Race wins: Satsuki Sho (1995)

Genuine (Japanese: ジェニュイン, Hepburn: Jenyuin; April 28, 1992 – January 19, 2015) was a Japanese Thoroughbred racehorse and sire. From the first crop of foals sired by Sunday Silence he won five of his twenty-one races and finished second seven times in a racing career which lasted from October 1994 until November 1997. After winning once as a juvenile in 1994 he improved to become one of the best colts of his generation in Japan in the following year, winning the Satsuki Sho and finishing second in the Tokyo Yushun. He remained in training for two more seasons, recording his best subsequent victory in the 1996 Mile Championship. Apart from his wins he was placed in the Yasuda Kinen and two runnings of the Tenno Sho. After his retirement from racing he had some success as breeding stallion in Japan and Australia.

== Background ==
Genuine was a brown horse with a white snip bred in Japan by Shadai Farm. He was from the first crop of foals sired by Sunday Silence, who won the 1989 Kentucky Derby, before retiring to stud in Japan where he was champion sire on thirteen consecutive occasions. His other major winners included Deep Impact, Stay Gold, Heart's Cry, Manhattan Cafe, Zenno Rob Roy and Neo Universe. Genuine's dam Croupier Lady was a successful racemare in the United States, winning thirteen races between 1985 and 1989 before being exported to Japan. In addition to Genuine, she produced Croupier Star the dam of Asakusa Kings the Best Japanese Three-Year-Old Colt of 2007. During his racing career, Genuine was owned by Shadai Race Horse Co Ltd and trained by Yasuhisa Matsuyama.

== Racing career ==
=== 1994: two-year-old season ===
Genuine began his racing career by finishing second in a maiden race over 1400 metres at Tokyo Racecourse on 15 October and then won a similar event over the same course and distance fifteen days later. On his final appearance of the season he finished second to Kokuto Julian in the Akamatsu Sho over 1600 metres at Tokyo on 27 November.

=== 1995: three-year-old season ===
Genuine began his second season by winning the Saintpaulia Sho over 1800 metres at Tokyo in January and then defeated Meiner Bridge over 2000 metres on heavy ground in the Wakaba Stakes at Nakayama Racecourse on 18 March. The colt was then moved up in class for the Grade I Satsuki Sho over 2000 metres at Nakayama on 16 April. Ridden by Yukio Okabe, he won from Tayasu Tsuyoshi and Automatic. On 28 May he was one of eighteen colts to contest the Tokyo Yushun over 2400 metres and finished second, beaten one and a half lengths by Tayasu Tsuyoshi.

He returned after a summer break and finished second to the five-year-old in a Grade III handicap race in September but then finished only sixth to Sugano Oji in the Grade II Mainichi Okan on 8 October. He then contested the autumn edition of the Tenno Sho over 2000 metres at Tokyo and finished second of the seventeen runners behind Sakura Chitose O. On his final appearance of the season he was invited to contest the 2500 metre Arima Kinen at Nakayama but made little impact and finished tenth behind Mayano Top Gun.

=== 1996: four-year-old season ===
Genuine made only two appearances in the first half of 1996. He finished second to Sakura Laurel in the Nakayama Kinen and fourth behind Trot Thunder, Taiki Blizzard and Hishi Akebono in the Yasuda Kinen. In October he finished unplaced behind Bubble Gum Fellow in the Tenno Sho and was then dropped back in distance for the Grade I Mile Championship at Kyoto Racecourse on 17 November. Ridden by Okabe, he recorded his second victory at the highest level as he won by half a length and a neck from the five-year-old mare Syourinomegami and Eishin Washington. As in 1997, he ended his year by finishing unplaced in the Arima Kinen.

=== 1997: five-year-old season ===
Genuine began his fourth season in the Yasuda Kinen and improved on his 1996 effort as he finished second of the eighteen runners behind Taiki Blizzard. He then finished fourth in a Grade II race at Sapporo Racecourse and fifth behind Bubble Gum Fellow in the Mainichi Okan. On October 26 he again contested the Tenno Sho and finished third behind Air Groove and Bubble Gum Fellow. On his final racecourse he attempted to repeat his 1996 success in the Mile Championship but finished unplaced behind Taiki Shuttle.

== Racing form ==
Genuine won five races out of 21 starts. This data is available in JBIS and netkeiba.

Date	Track	Race	Grade	Distance (Condition)	Entry	HN	Odds (Favored)	Finish	Time	Margins	Jockey	Winner (Runner-up)
1994 – two-year-old season
Oct 15	Tokyo	2yo Newcomer		1,400 m (Firm)	7	3	2.0 (1)	2nd	1:24.9	0.4	Yukio Okabe	Air Luge
Oct 30	Tokyo	2yo Newcomer		1,400 m (Firm)	11	7	1.3 (1)	1st	1:22.8	–0.5	Yukio Okabe	(Dai Chu Jinden)
Nov 27	Tokyo	Akamatsu Sho	ALW (1W)	1,600 m (Firm)	12	9	2.0 (1)	2nd	1:35.1	0.2	Thierry Jarnet	Kokuto Julian
1995 – three-year-old season
Jan 28	Tokyo	Saintpaulia Sho	ALW (1W)	1,800 m (Firm)	16	3	1.5 (1)	1st	1:48.9	–0.2	Katsuharu Tanaka	(Forse du Nord)
Mar 18	Nakayama	Wakaba Stakes	OP	2,000 m (Heavy)	8	6	2.4 (2)	1st	2:08.1	–0.1	Yukio Okabe	(Meiner Bridge)
Apr 16	Nakayama	Satsuki Sho	1	2,000 m (Good)	16	6	6.9 (3)	1st	2:02.5	–0.1	Yukio Okabe	(Tayasu Tsuyoshi)
May 28	Tokyo	Tokyo Yushun	1	2,400 m (Firm)	18	13	3.5 (2)	2nd	2:27.5	0.2	Yukio Okabe	Tayasu Tsuyoshi
Sep 10	Nakayama	Keio Hai Autumn Handicap	3	1,600 m (Firm)	12	2	2.0 (1)	2nd	1:32.7	0.0	Yukio Okabe	Dojima Muteki
Oct 8	Tokyo	Mainichi Okan	2	1,800 m (Soft)	14	4	2.3 (1)	6th	1:49.1	0.7	Yukio Okabe	Sugano Oji
Oct 29	Tokyo	Tenno Sho (Autumn)	1	2,000 m (Firm)	17	4	7.4 (4)	2nd	1:58.0	0.0	Yukio Okabe	Sakura Chitose O
Dec 24	Nakayama	Arima Kinen	1	2,500 m (Firm)	12	6	5.3 (3)	10th	2:35.5	1.9	Yukio Okabe	Mayano Top Gun
1996 – four-year-old season
Mar 10	Nakayama	Nakayama Kinen	2	1,800 m (Firm)	15	3	3.7 (1)	2nd	1:47.5	0.3	Yukio Okabe	Sakura Laurel
Jun 9	Tokyo	Yasuda Kinen	1	1,600 m (Firm)	17	9	13.8 (6)	4th	1:33.4	0.3	Katsuharu Tanaka	Trot Thunder
Oct 27	Tokyo	Tenno Sho (Autumn)	1	2,000 m (Firm)	17	12	21.7 (8)	14th	2:00.0	1.3	Yoshitomi Shibata	Bubble Gum Fellow
Nov 17	Kyoto	Mile Championship	1	1,600 m (Firm)	18	14	4.9 (1)	1st	1:33.8	–0.1	Yukio Okabe	(Syourinomegami)
Dec 22	Nakayama	Arima Kinen	1	2,500 m (Firm)	14	7	32.0 (10)	14th	2:37.2	3.4	Olivier Peslier	Sakura Laurel
1997 – five-year-old season
Jun 8	Tokyo	Yasuda Kinen	1	1,600 m (Firm)	18	16	11.7 (5)	2nd	1:33.9	0.1	Katsuharu Tanaka	Taiki Blizzard
Aug 17	Sapporo	Sapporo Kinen	2	2,000 m (Firm)	13	4	2.8 (2)	4th	2:00.7	0.5	Yukio Okabe	Air Groove
Oct 5	Tokyo	Mainichi Okan	2	1,800 m (Firm)	9	1	3.5 (3)	5th	1:46.3	0.2	Yutaka Take	Bubble Gum Fellow
Oct 26	Tokyo	Tenno Sho (Autumn)	1	2,000 m (Firm)	16	1	9.6 (3)	3rd	1:59.9	0.9	Katsuharu Tanaka	Air Groove
Nov 16	Kyoto	Mile Championship	1	1,600 m (Firm)	18	12	7.8 (4)	9th	1:34.9	1.6	Katsuharu Tanaka	Taiki Shuttle

Legend:
Turf

== Stud record ==
Genuine was retired from racing to become a breeding stallion for Shadai Farm in Japan, and was also shuttled to stand in Australia. He was retired from stud duty in 2009 and died on 19 January 2015 at the age of twenty-three. The best of his offspring was the Australian-bred Pompeii Ruler, whose wins included the Australian Cup and the Queen Elizabeth Stakes (ATC). His Japanese runners included the Graded stakes winners Don Cool and Maple Road.

c = colt, f = filly, g = gelding
bold = GI/JpnI stakes

Grade winners
Foaled	Name	Sex	Major Wins
2000	Maple Road	f	Kokura Nisai Stakes
2002	Battle Brave	c	Kokura Summer Jump
2002	Best Grand Cha	c	Tokyo Autumn Jump
2002	Don Cool	c	Hyogo Championship, Nagoya Daishoten
2002	Pompeii Ruler	g	St. George Stakes, **Australian Cup, Queen Elizabeth Stakes**
2004	Tamamo Glare	g	Kyoto High Jump

== In popular culture ==
An anthropomorphized version of Genuine appears in Umamusume: Pretty Derby and voiced by Mirii Fukushima.

== Pedigree ==
Pedigree of Genuine (JPN), brown stallion 1992
Sire Sunday Silence (USA) 1986	Halo (USA); 1969	Hail to Reason	Turn-To
Sire Sunday Silence (USA) 1986	Halo (USA); 1969	Hail to Reason	Nothirdchance
Sire Sunday Silence (USA) 1986	Halo (USA); 1969	Cosmah	Cosmic Bomb
Sire Sunday Silence (USA) 1986	Halo (USA); 1969	Cosmah	Almahmoud
Sire Sunday Silence (USA) 1986	Wishing Well (USA); 1975	Understanding	Promised Land
Sire Sunday Silence (USA) 1986	Wishing Well (USA); 1975	Understanding	Pretty Ways
Sire Sunday Silence (USA) 1986	Wishing Well (USA); 1975	Mountain Flower	Montparnasse
Sire Sunday Silence (USA) 1986	Wishing Well (USA); 1975	Mountain Flower	Edelweiss
Dam Croupier Lady (USA) 1983	What Luck (USA); 1967	Bold Ruler	Nasrullah
Dam Croupier Lady (USA) 1983	What Luck (USA); 1967	Bold Ruler	Miss Disco
Dam Croupier Lady (USA) 1983	What Luck (USA); 1967	Irish Jay	Double Jay
Dam Croupier Lady (USA) 1983	What Luck (USA); 1967	Irish Jay	Irish Witch
Dam Croupier Lady (USA) 1983	Question d'Argent (CAN); 1977	Tentam	Intentionally
Dam Croupier Lady (USA) 1983	Question d'Argent (CAN); 1977	Tentam	Tamerett
Dam Croupier Lady (USA) 1983	Question d'Argent (CAN); 1977	Cold Reply	Northern Dancer
Dam Croupier Lady (USA) 1983	Question d'Argent (CAN); 1977	Cold Reply	Respond (Family 4-g)
