= Vodka (horse) =

Japanese-bred Thoroughbred racehorse

Vodka ウオッカ
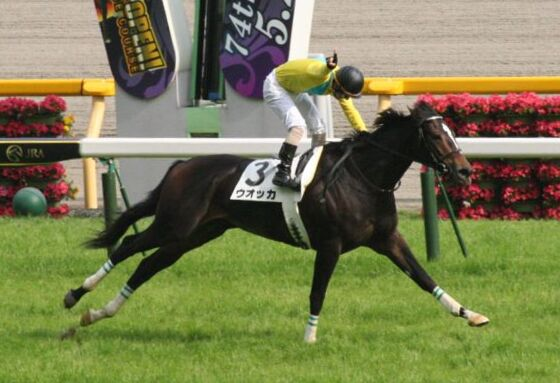
- Vodka racing at the 2007 Tokyo Yūshun.
- Breed: Thoroughbred
- Sire: Tanino Gimlet (JPN)
- Grandsire: Brian's Time (USA)
- Dam: Tanino Sister (JPN)
- Damsire: Rousillon (USA)
- Sex: Mare
- Foaled: 4 April 2004; Country Bokujo, Shizunai, Hokkaido, Japan
- Died: 1 April 2019 (aged 14); Newmarket, Suffolk, England
- Country: Japan
- Colour: Bay
- Breeder: Country Bokujo
- Owner: Yuzo Tanimizu
- Racing colors
- Trainer: Katsuhiko Sumii
- Jockey: Hirofumi Shii; Yutaka Take
- Record: 26: 10–5–3
- Earnings: ¥1,333,565,800 JPY ($8,413,398 USD)

Major wins
- Hanshin Juvenile Fillies (2006); Tulip Sho (2007); Yasuda Kinen (2008, 2009); Tenno Sho (Autumn) (2008); Victoria Mile (2009); Japan Cup (2009); Japanese Classic Race wins: Tokyo Yūshun (2007)

Awards
- JRA Award for Best Two-Year-Old Filly (2006); Japanese Champion Older Female (2008, 2009); Japanese Horse of the Year (2008, 2009); JRA Special Award (2007)

Honours
- Japan Racing Association Hall of Fame (2011)

Vodka (Japanese: ウオッカ, Hepburn: Uokka; 4 April 2004 – 1 April 2019) was a Japanese Thoroughbred racehorse and broodmare. She won seven G1 races in Japan, including the 2007 Tokyo Yūshun, the first filly to win this race in 64 years since Kurifuji in 1943 as well as the 2009 Japan Cup. She was awarded the JRA Horse of the Year award in 2008 and 2009 and was inducted to the Japan Racing Association Hall of Fame in 2011.

== Breeding ==
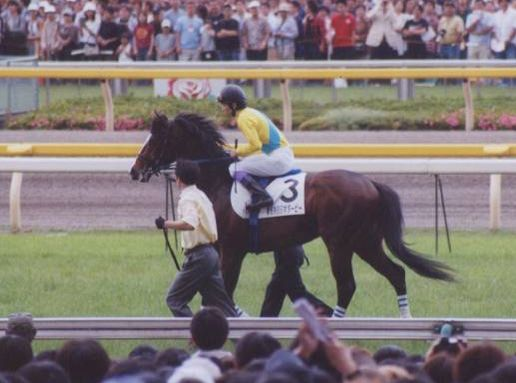
Tanino Gimlet, the sire of Vodka.

Vodka was foaled on 4 April 2004 at Country Bokujo in Shizunai, Hokkaido. She was a bay mare with a white blaze by the 2002 Tokyo Yushun (Derby) winner, Tanino Gimlet out of Tanino Sister by Rousillon (USA). Her owner named her "Vodka" because he wanted her to be stronger than her father, named after the cocktail gimlet. He dropped the crown name "Tanino" when naming Vodka as he feared it would dilute the impact of her name.

Vodka would be sent to be trained under Katsuhiko Sumii.

== Racing career ==
=== 2006: two-year old season ===
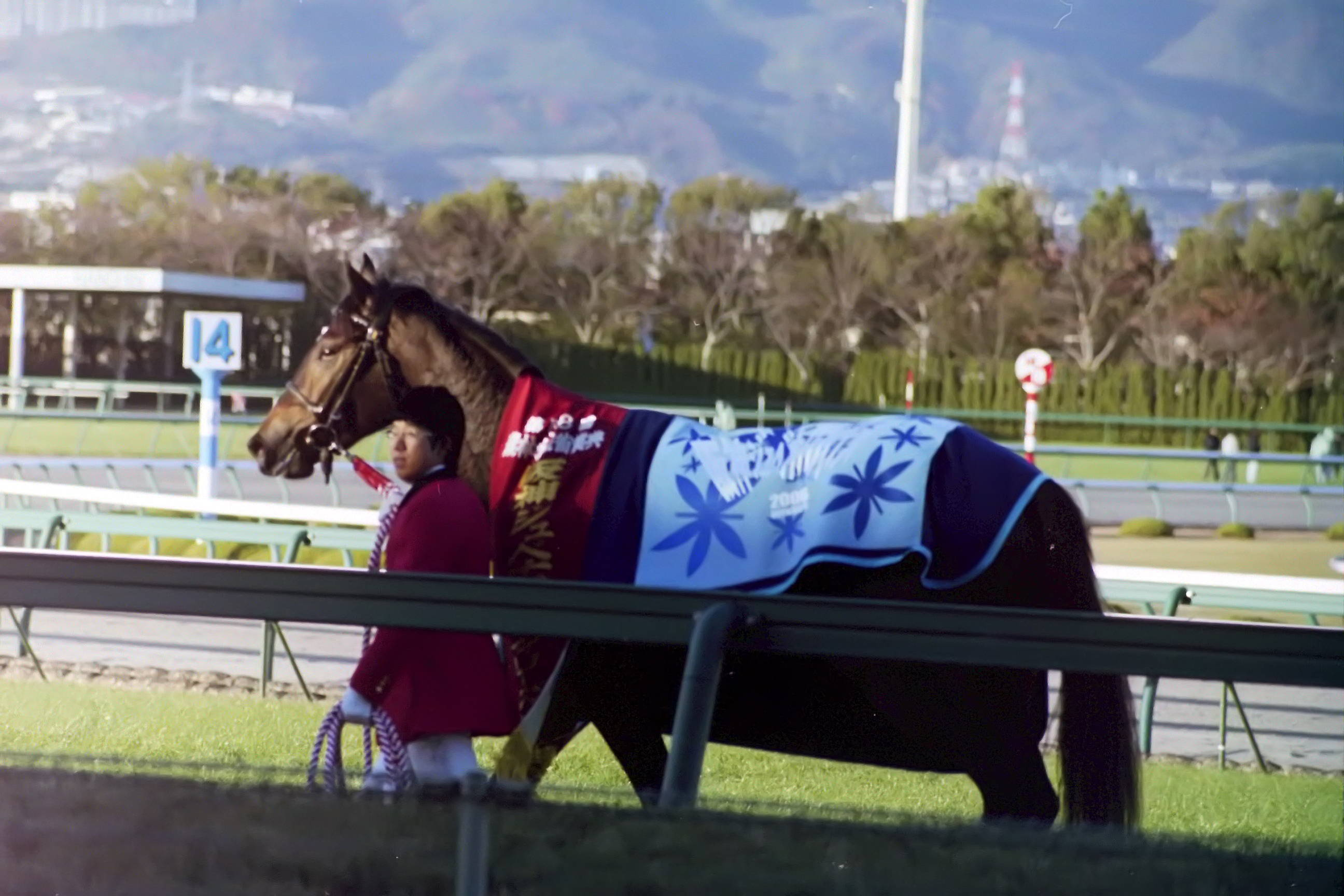
Vodka after winning the Hanshin Juvenile Fillies

In 2006, Vodka won her first race start and was second in the ungraded Kigiku Sho, both of which were contested at the Kyoto Racecourse. Vodka would then go on to win the G1 Hanshin Juvenile Fillies race held at the Hanshin Racecourse, beating out Aston Machan by a neck. For her accomplishments, Vodka was awarded the 2006 JRA Award for Best Two-Year-Old Filly.

=== 2007: three-year old season ===
In 2007, Vodka won her first start in the ungraded Elfin Stakes, followed by another win in the G3 Tulip Sho, from Daiwa Scarlet, who finished in second place. At her next start on 8 April, in the G1 Oka Shō (Japanese 1000 Guineas), the first race of the Japanese Triple Tiara, Daiwa Scarlet relegated Vodka to second place. Daiwa Scarlet and Vodka would go on to meet a total of four times that year. Daiwa Scarlet bested her in three of those races. One of those contests was not a win for Daiwa Scarlet though, in the 2007 G1 Arima Kinen at Nakayama Racecourse, Daiwa Scarlet finished second to Matsurida Gogh, with Vodka finishing 11th.

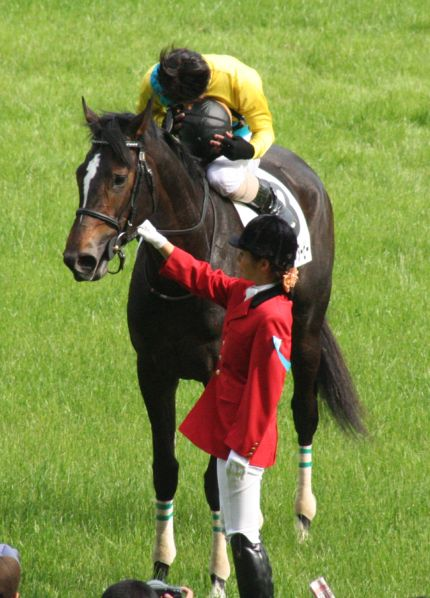
Vodka's jockey, Hirofumi Shii, bowing to Crown Prince Naruhito who, along with Prime Minister Shinzo Abe and First Lady Akie Abe, was spectating the Japanese Derby

External videos
- Official 2007 Tokyo Yūshun race footage

Vodka's next race start was in the G1 Tokyo Yūshun, also known as the Japanese Derby, the second jewel in the Classic Triple Crown. Fillies are usually entered in the Yushun Himba, also known as the Japanese Oaks, which is the second jewel of the Japanese Triple Tiara which is a week before the race, however, in a move that shocked the racing world, Vodka won handily, defeating a field of some of the best three-year-old colts in the country. She became the first filly to win the race in 64 years.

Vodka was unplaced in her next start before racing in the G1 Shuka Sho, which is the last race of the Japanese Filly Triple Crown races. Daiwa Scarlet won the race, with Vodka finishing in third place. She was entered in the 2007 Queen Elizabeth II Commemorative Cup, but was scratched a few hours before the race due to what was thought to be a hip problem. In her next start Vodka finished 4th in the G1 Japan Cup. Vodka subsequently did not place in her last start of the season.

Despite winning the Japanese Derby. She lost to Daiwa Scarlet in being awarded the JRA Award for Best Three-Year-Old Filly as Vodka never finished above her in the 3 races in which both horses participated, but the achievement in the Derby led to her receiving the JRA Special Award (an award given to horses/person achieved special achievements, usually historical records, not awarded every year) instead. Her 9 race starts of the season resulted in 3 wins, 1 second and 1 third place.

=== 2008: four-year old season ===
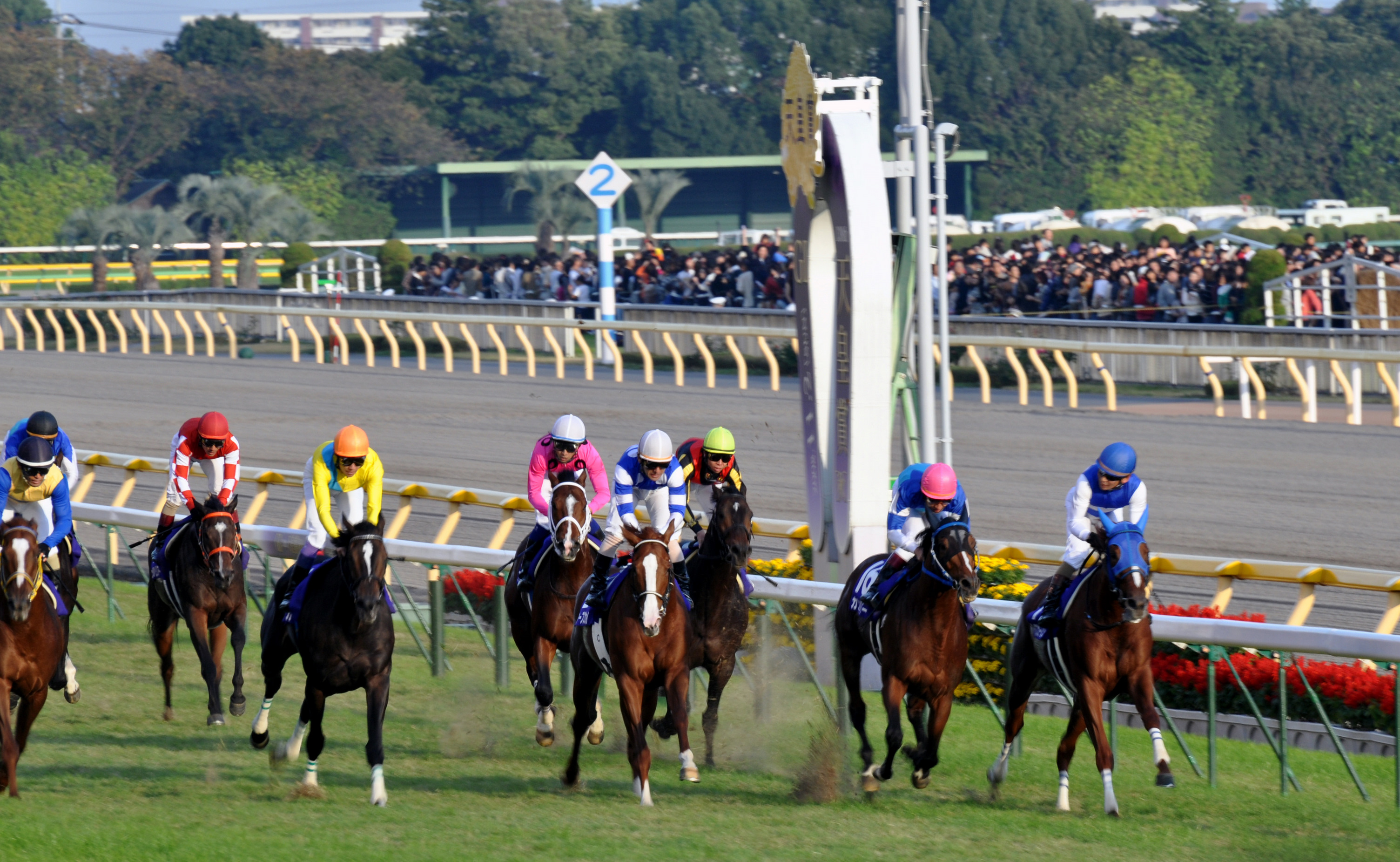
Vodka (left, orange helmet) and Daiwa Scarlet (right, blue helmet) after finishing the Autumn Tenno Sho

In her first start of the season Vodka was unplaced in the G2 Kyōto Kinen. Vodka then went to Dubai in the spring of 2008 to race in the G1 Dubai Duty Free on Dubai World Cup Night. She came in a fast closing fourth. Then upon her return to Japan, Vodka narrowly lost the G1 Victoria Mile to Asian Winds in May. She next easily won the G1 Yasuda Kinen in June and narrowly defeated Daiwa Scarlet in the G1 Tenno Sho (Autumn). Finally that season even though she was heavily favored, she was unable to win the G1 Japan Cup and came in a close third to Screen Hero.

During 2008, Vodka had 8 starts for the above 2 wins, 2 seconds in the G1 Victoria Mile and G2 Mainichi Okan; 1 third in the G1 Japan Cup and 1 fourth in the G1 Dubai Duty Free.

=== 2009: five-year old season ===
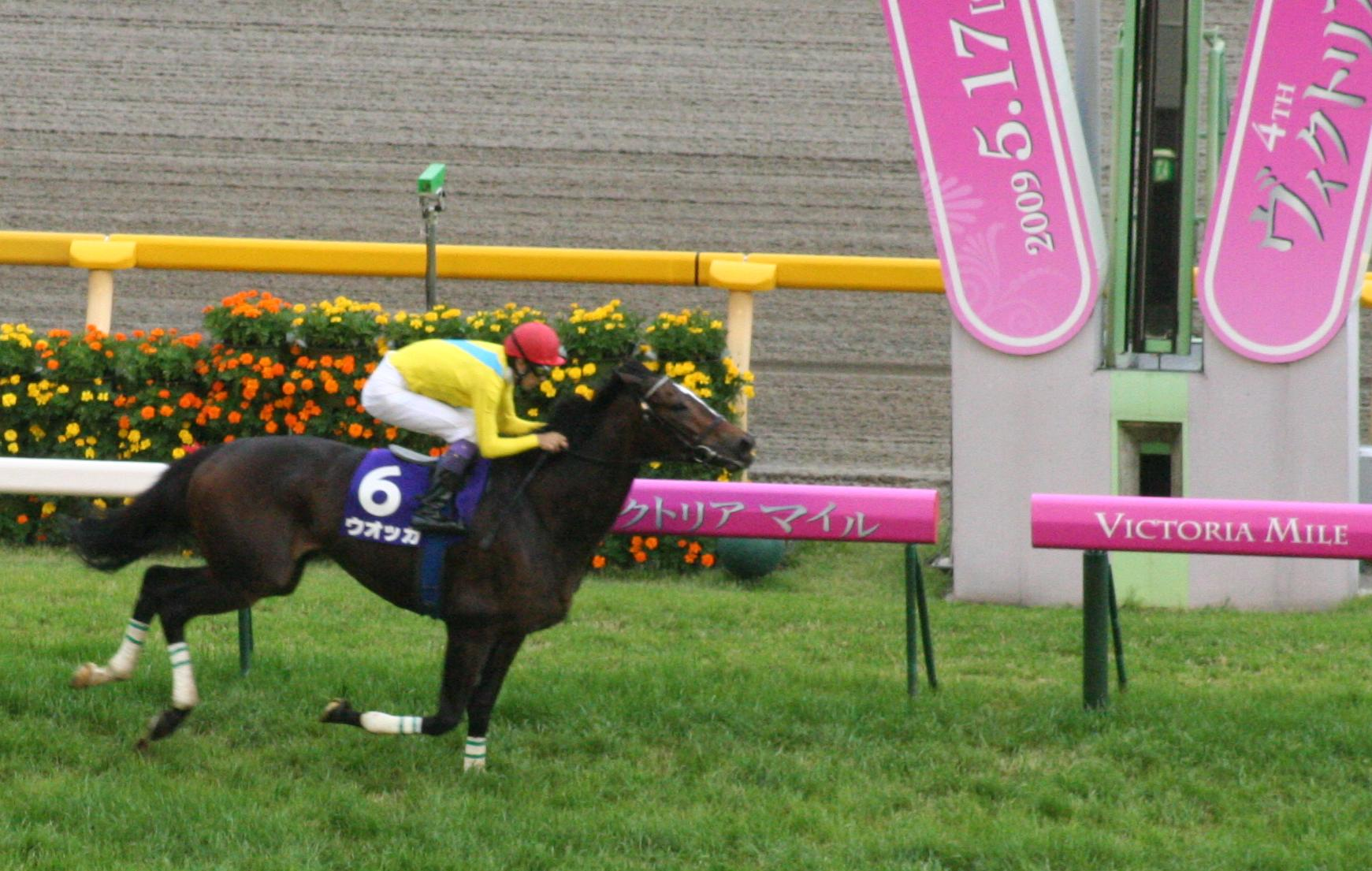
Vodka winning the 2009 Victoria Mile

Vodka’s successive wins in the Yasuda Kinen triplicated what had only been achieved twice before, by Sweet Sue in 1952 and 1953 and by Yamanin Zephyr in 1992 and 1993. In the 2009 running, another photo finish decided the winner, in which the five-year-old mare Vodka on her third Japan Cup try with the French jockey Christophe Lemaire won by a nose over the 2008 Kikuka Sho winner Oken Bruce Lee, in a time of 2 minutes and 22.4 seconds, the third-fastest Japan Cup ever run at the standard 2,400-meter distance. Vodka's win would make her the second highest earning racehorse in Japan. Vodka placed 4th in the 2007 running to Admire Moon and 3rd in the 2008 running to Screen Hero, in which the latter ran 13th in the 2009 race. Vodka had a nosebleed during the Japan Cup and was prohibited from racing for a month following her triumphant Japan Cup run according to Japan Racing Association rules.

Her 7 race starts of the season resulted in 3 wins, 1 second and 1 third placing. Vodka was voted Horse of the Year, for the second consecutive year and became the first female to win the title twice.

=== 2010: six-year old season ===
Vodka had her first start on the synthetic Tapeta Footings surface in the Dubai International Racing Carnival Al Maktoum Challenge Round 3 (G2), after racing exclusively on turf in each of her previous 25 starts. In this race she finished eighth and was retired from racing altogether following another nasal bleeding attack.

Her main jockeys included Hirofumi Shii, who rode her in four wins, and Yutaka Take, in three wins. In her final two races Vodka was ridden by Frenchman Christophe Lemaire, who rode her in the Japan Cup victory.

Vodka finished her racing career with a total 10 wins in 22 races in Japan, with wins in seven grade I races, including the 2006 Hanshin Juvenile Fillies, the 2007 Tokyo Yushun (Japanese Derby), the 2008 Yasuda Kinen and Tenno Sho (Autumn), the 2009 Victoria Mile, Yasuda Kinen and Japan Cup. She equalled the record of the Japanese Triple Crown winners Symboli Rudolf and Deep Impact, as well as T. M. Opera O, for the most grade 1 races won in Japan.

Vodka was inducted into the Japan Racing Association Hall of Fame in 2011.

== Retirement ==
Vodka was retired from racing in 2010 and was shipped from Dubai to Ireland to be mated to the 2009 Prix de l'Arc de Triomphe winner Sea the Stars at the Aga Khan's Gilltown Stud in County Kildare. On 2 May 2011, Vodka foaled a dark bay colt as a result of this mating. She had seven foals in total.

=== Breeding record ===
c = colt, f = filly

No.	Name	Year	Sex	Color	Sire	Wins	Races	Remarks
1st	Volare	2011	c	Dark Bay	Sea the Stars	0	2	Deceased
2nd	Case by Case	2012	f	Dark Bay	Sea the Stars	0	6	Deceased, former broodmare
3rd	Tanino Urban Sea	2013	f	Dark Bay	Sea the Stars	4	19	Retired, broodmare
4th	Tanino Frankel	2015	c	Brown	Frankel	4	26	Retired, breeding stallion
5th	Tanino Mission	2016	f	Bay	Invincible Spirit	1	18	Retired, broodmare
6th	Seven Pockets	2017	c	Bay	Frankel	2	10	Retired, breeding stallion
7th	(Vodka 2019)	2019	f	Bay	Frankel			

=== Death ===
Vodka died on 1 April 2019 after developing laminitis on both hinds caused by kicking a concrete wall in Newmarket, Suffolk. This was after she went through surgery to treat her right hind leg which was found to be broken. She was 14 years old. She was cremated, with part of her ashes buried beneath a gravestone under a cherry blossom tree on private land in Newmarket, and the remainder entrusted to her owner, Yuzo Tanimizu.

== In popular culture ==
An anthropomorphized version of Vodka appears as a character in the Japanese multimedia franchise Umamusume: Pretty Derby, voiced by Ayaka Ōhashi. Depicted as a rough-and-tumble tomboy, Vodka looks up to both her motorcyclist father as well as upperclassman Tanino Gimlet, her real-life sire, and strives to replicate the "cool" image she sees from them. She has a heated rivalry with her roommate Daiwa Scarlet, as even outside the racetrack the two cannot help but bicker over any topic imaginable and make competitions out of every activity; despite being rivals, they show great care and concern for one another.

== Racing record ==
Below data is based on data available on JBIS Search and netkeiba.com.

Date	Age	Racecourse	Race	Grade	Distance (condition)	Entry	HN	Odds (Favored)	Finish	Time	Margins	Jockey	Winner (Runner-up)
29 Oct 2006	2	Kyoto	2yo Newcomer		1,600 m (Firm)	13	4	3.3 (2)	1st	1:35.0	-0.6	Katsuma Sameshima	(Lace Doll)
12 Nov 2006	2	Kyoto	Kigiku Sho	ALW	1,800 m (Firm)	8	7	3.0 (2)	2nd	1:49.5	0.2	Hirofumi Shii	Meiner Soliste
3 Dec 2006	2	Hanshin	Hanshin Juvenile Fillies	1	1,600 m (Firm)	18	2	11.1 (4)	1st	R1:33.1	-0.0	Hirofumi Shii	(Aston Machan)
3 Feb 2007	3	Kyoto	Elfin Stakes	OP	1,600 m (Firm)	9	9	1.7 (1)	1st	1:33.7	-0.5	Hirofumi Shii	(Nishino Manamusume)
3 Mar 2007	3	Hanshin	Tulip Sho	3	1,600 m (Firm)	16	11	1.4 (1)	1st	1:33.7	-0.0	Hirofumi Shii	(Daiwa Scarlet)
8 Apr 2007	3	Hanshin	Oka Sho	1	1,600 m (Firm)	18	14	1.4 (1)	2nd	1:33.9	0.2	Hirofumi Shii	Daiwa Scarlet
27 May 2007	3	Tokyo	Tōkyō Yūshun	1	2,400 m (Firm)	18	3	10.5 (3)	1st	2:24.5	-0.5	Hirofumi Shii	(Asakusa Kings)
24 Jun 2007	3	Hanshin	Takarazuka Kinen	1	2,200 m (Good)	18	2	3.5 (1)	8th	2:14.0	1.6	Hirofumi Shii	Admire Moon
14 Oct 2007	3	Kyoto	Shuka Sho	1	2,000 m (Firm)	18	16	2.7 (1)	3rd	1:59.3	0.2	Hirofumi Shii	Daiwa Scarlet
11 Nov 2007	3	Kyoto	QEII Cup	1	2,200 m (Firm)	14	3	-- (--)	Scr	--	--	Hirofumi Shii	Daiwa Scarlet
25 Nov 2007	3	Tokyo	Japan Cup	1	2,400 m (Firm)	18	11	6.1 (2)	4th	2:24.9	0.2	Hirofumi Shii	Admire Moon
23 Dec 2007	3	Nakayama	Arima Kinen	1	2,500 m (Good)	16	16	6.9 (3)	11th	2:35.7	2.1	Hirofumi Shii	Matsurida Gogh
23 Feb 2008	4	Kyoto	Kyōto Kinen	2	2,200 m (Firm)	16	16	3.4 (2)	6th	2:13.9	0.3	Hirofumi Shii	Admire Aura
29 Mar 2008	4	Nad Al Sheba	Dubai Duty Free	1	1,777 m (Good)	16	12	-- (--)	4th	1:46.6	0.4	Yutaka Take	Jay Peg
18 May 2008	4	Tokyo	Victoria Mile	1	1,600 m (Firm)	18	9	2.1 (1)	2nd	1:33.8	0.1	Yutaka Take	Asian Winds
8 Jun 2008	4	Tokyo	Yasuda Kinen	1	1,600 m (Firm)	18	5	4.1 (2)	1st	1:32.7	-0.6	Yasunari Iwata	(Armada)
12 Oct 2008	4	Tokyo	Mainichi Okan	2	1,800 m (Firm)	16	3	1.5 (1)	2nd	1:44.6	0.0	Yutaka Take	Super Hornet
2 Nov 2008	4	Tokyo	Tenno Sho (Autumn)	1	2,000 m (Firm)	17	14	2.7 (1)	1st	R1:57.2	-0.0	Yutaka Take	(Daiwa Scarlet)
30 Nov 2008	4	Tokyo	Japan Cup	1	2,400 m (Firm)	18	4	3.7 (2)	3rd	2:25.7	0.2	Yasunari Iwata	Screen Hero
5 Mar 2009	5	Nad Al Sheba	Jebel Hatta	2	1,777 m (Firm)	16	7	-- (--)	5th	1:49.2	0.4	Yutaka Take	Balius
28 Mar 2009	5	Nad Al Sheba	Dubai Duty Free	1	1,777 m (Good)	16	3	-- (--)	7th	1:48.7	1.8	Yutaka Take	Gladiatorus
17 May 2009	5	Tokyo	Victoria Mile	1	1,600 m (Firm)	18	6	1.7 (1)	1st	1:32.4	-1.2	Yutaka Take	(Bravo Daisy)
7 Jun 2009	5	Tokyo	Yasuda Kinen	1	1,600 m (Firm)	18	3	1.8 (1)	1st	1:33.5	-0.1	Yutaka Take	(Deep Sky)
11 Oct 2009	5	Tokyo	Mainichi Okan	2	1,800 m (Firm)	11	6	1.3 (1)	2nd	1:45.5	0.2	Yutaka Take	Company
1 Nov 2009	5	Tokyo	Tenno Sho (Autumn)	1	2,000 m (Firm)	18	7	2.1 (1)	3rd	1:57.5	0.3	Yutaka Take	Company
29 Nov 2009	5	Tokyo	Japan Cup	1	2,400 m (Firm)	18	5	3.6 (1)	1st	2:22.4	-0.0	Christophe Lemaire	(Oken Bruce Lee)
4 Mar 2010	6	Meydan	Al Maktoum Challenge	2	2,000 m (Standard)	14	8	-- (--)	8th	--	--	Christophe Lemaire	Red Desire

Legend:

Turf All Weather

== Pedigree ==
Pedigree of Vodka (JPN), bay mare, 2004
Sire Tanino Gimlet (JPN) B. 1999	*Brian's Time (USA) 1985	Roberto	Hail to Reason
Sire Tanino Gimlet (JPN) B. 1999	*Brian's Time (USA) 1985	Roberto	Bramalea
Sire Tanino Gimlet (JPN) B. 1999	*Brian's Time (USA) 1985	Kelley's Day	Graustark
Sire Tanino Gimlet (JPN) B. 1999	*Brian's Time (USA) 1985	Kelley's Day	Golden Trail
Sire Tanino Gimlet (JPN) B. 1999	Tanino Crystal; 1988	*Crystal Palace (FR)	Caro
Sire Tanino Gimlet (JPN) B. 1999	Tanino Crystal; 1988	*Crystal Palace (FR)	Hermieres
Sire Tanino Gimlet (JPN) B. 1999	Tanino Crystal; 1988	*Tanino Sea-Bird (USA)	Sea-Bird
Sire Tanino Gimlet (JPN) B. 1999	Tanino Crystal; 1988	*Tanino Sea-Bird (USA)	Flaxen
Dam Tanino Sister (JPN) Ch. 1993	*Rousillon (USA); 1981	Riverman	Never Bend
Dam Tanino Sister (JPN) Ch. 1993	*Rousillon (USA); 1981	Riverman	River Lady
Dam Tanino Sister (JPN) Ch. 1993	*Rousillon (USA); 1981	Belle Dorine	Marshua's Dancer
Dam Tanino Sister (JPN) Ch. 1993	*Rousillon (USA); 1981	Belle Dorine	Palsy Walsy
Dam Tanino Sister (JPN) Ch. 1993	Energy Tosho; 1987	Tosho Boy	*Tesco Boy (GB)
Dam Tanino Sister (JPN) Ch. 1993	Energy Tosho; 1987	Tosho Boy	*Social Butterfly (USA) 1963
Dam Tanino Sister (JPN) Ch. 1993	Energy Tosho; 1987	Cornice Tosho	Dandy Lute (FR)
Dam Tanino Sister (JPN) Ch. 1993	Energy Tosho; 1987	Cornice Tosho	Rose Tosho (Family: 3-l)

== See also ==
- List of leading Thoroughbred racehorses
- List of racehorses
