= Fuji Kiseki =

Japanese-bred Thoroughbred racehorse

Fuji Kiseki フジキセキ
- Breed: Thoroughbred
- Sire: Sunday Silence
- Grandsire: Halo
- Dam: Millracer
- Damsire: Le Fabuleux
- Sex: Stallion
- Foaled: 15 April 1992
- Died: 28 December 2015 (aged 23)
- Country: Japan
- Colour: Brown
- Breeder: Shadai Farm
- Owner: Yomoji Saito
- Racing colours
- Trainer: Sakae Watanabe
- Jockey: Koichi Tsunoda
- Record: 4: 4–0–0
- Earnings: ¥129,650,000

Major wins
- Asahi Hai Sansai Stakes (1994); Yayoi Sho (1995)

Awards
- JRA Award for Best Two-Year-Old Colt (1994)

Fuji Kiseki (Japanese: フジキセキ, Hepburn: Fuji Kiseki; 15 April 1992 – 28 December 2015) was a Japanese Thoroughbred racehorse and sire. He was the best Japanese two-year-old of his generation in 1994 when he won all three of his starts including the Asahi Hai Sansai Stakes. In the following spring he took his unbeaten run to four with a win in the Yayoi Sho before his racing career was ended by injury. After his retirement from racing he became a very successful breeding stallion. He died in 2015 at the age of 23.

== Background ==
Fuji Kiseki was a brown or black horse standing 1.63 metres high with a white star and a white sock on his right hind leg bred by the Shadai Farm. During his racing career he was owned by Yomoji Saito and trained by Sakae Watanabe.

He was from the first crop of foals sired by Sunday Silence, who won the 1989 Kentucky Derby, before retiring to stud in Japan where he was champion sire on thirteen consecutive occasions. His other major winners included Deep Impact, Stay Gold, Heart's Cry, Manhattan Cafe, Zenno Rob Roy and Neo Universe. Fuji Kiseki's dam Millracer was bred in Virginia and won two minor races in the United States before being exported to Japan. Her grand-dam Millicent was a half-sister to Mill Reef.

== Racing career ==
=== 1994: two-year-old season ===
Fuji Kiseki made his racecourse debut in an event for previously unraced juveniles over 1200 metres at Niigata Racecourse on 20 August and won by more than five lengths over the filly Shell Queen. At Hanshin Racecourse on 8 October he won the Momiji Stakes from Tayasu Tsuyoshi, a colt who won the Japanese Derby in 1995. On his final start of the year the colt was stepped up to Grade 1 class for the Asahi Hai Sansai Stakes over 1600 metres at Nakayama Racecourse, beating Ski Captain and Kokuto Julian.

=== 1995: three-year-old season ===
On his three-year-old debut Fuji Kiseki contested the Grade 2 Yayoi Sho (a major trial race for the Satsuki Sho) over 2000 meters at Nakayama and won from Hokkai Rousseau and Hashino Taiyu.

Shortly after the race he sustained a tendon injury which ended his racing career.

== Stud career ==
After the end of his racing career, Fuji Kiseki became a breeding stallion at the Shadai Stallion Station in Hokkaido, standing for a stud fee of ¥4,000,000. Later in his stud career he was shuttled to spend the southern hemisphere breeding season at the Arrowfield Stud in New South Wales. He sired several major winners including Straight Girl, Kane Hekili, Isla Bonita, Sun Classique (Sheema Classic), Danon Chantilly (NHK Mile Cup), Sadamu Patek (Mile Championship), Fine Grain (Takamatsunomiya Kinen) Asian Winds (Victoria Mile), Kinshasa No Kiseki (Takamatsunomiya Kinen) and Koiuta (Victoria Mile). In total, Fuji Kiseki was paired with 658 dams, siring 3787 named foals, with 2256 of them going on to win races. He was pensioned in 2011 and died in December 2015 after sustaining a "cervical spine injury".

=== Notable progeny ===
c = colt, f = filly, g = gelding
bold = Grade 1 stakes

Foaled	Name	Sex	Major Wins
1997	Daitaku Riva	c	Spring Stakes, Kyoto Kimpai (twice), Naruo Kinen, Shinzan Kinen
2001	Tamamo Hot Play	c	Swan Stakes, Silk Road Stakes
2002	Kane Hekili	c	**Japan Cup Dirt** (twice), **Japan Dirt Derby**, **February Stakes**, **Tokyo Daishōten**, **Kawasaki Kinen**, Unicorn Stakes
2003	Sun Classique	f	Diana Stakes, **Cape Fillies Guineas**, **Majorca Stakes**, **Woolavington 2200**, **Dubai Sheema Classic**
2003	Kinshasa no Kiseki	c	**Takamatsunomiya Kinen** (twice), Hanshin Cup (twice), Swan Stakes, Ocean Stakes, Hakodate Sprint Stakes
2003	Fine Grain	c	**Takamatsunomiya Kinen**, Silk Road Stakes
2003	Grace Tiara	f	**Zen-Nippon Nisai Yushun**
2003	Koiuta	f	**Victoria Mile**, Daily Hai Queen Cup
2004	Asian Winds	f	**Victoria Mile**, Hanshin Himba Stakes
2004	Ultima Thule	f	Centaur Stakes, Silk Road Stakes
2007	Danon Chantilly	c	**NHK Mile Cup**, Mainichi Hai
2008	Sadamu Patek	c	**Mile Championship**, Keio Hai Spring Cup, Yayoi Sho, Chukyo Kinen, Tokyo Sports Hai Nisai Stakes
2009	Straight Girl	f	**Sprinters Stakes**, **Victoria Mile** (twice), Silk Road Stakes
2011	Isla Bonita	c	**Satsuki Shō**, Yomiuri Milers Cup, St. Lite Kinen, Hanshin Cup, Kyodo Tsushin Hai, Tokyo Sports Hai Nisai Stakes
2011	Rosa Gigantea	c	Hanshin Cup, Spring Stakes

== In popular culture ==
An anthropomorphized version of Fuji Kiseki appears as a character in the Japanese multimedia franchise Umamusume: Pretty Derby, voiced by Eriko Matsui. She is depicted as the assigned head student of Ritto, one of Tracen Academy's dormitory buildings named after the real-life training center of the same name, where she acts as a big sister figure to her junior schoolmates, whom she teasingly refers to as "ponies." She also appears as a major character in the 2024 movie, "Umamusume: Pretty Derby – Beginning of a New Era," which partly adapts the end of her racing career and subsequent retirement.

In the manga Midori no Makibaō, the titular character Midori Makibaou's main rival, Cascade, is believed to be based on Fuji Kiseki.

== Race record ==
Date	Age	Track	Name	Type/Distance	Field	Finished	Margin	Time	Jockey	Runner‑up	Ref
20 Aug 1994	2	Niigata	Maiden Race	Turf 1200m	8	1st	8 lengths	1:09.8	Masayoshi Ebina	Shell Queen	
8 Oct 1994	2	Hanshin	Momiji Stakes (OP)	Turf 1600m	9	1st	1 1/4 lengths	1:35.5 (record)	Koichi Tsunoda	Tayasu Tsuyoshi	
11 Dec 1994	2	Nakayama	Asahi Hai Sansai Stakes (G1)	Turf 1600m	10	1st	Neck	1:34.7	Koichi Tsunoda	Ski Captain	
5 Mar 1995	3	Nakayama	Hochi Hai Yayoi Sho (G2)	Turf 2000m	10	1st	2 1/2 lengths	2:03.7	Koichi Tsunoda	Hokkai Rousseau	

== Pedigree ==
Pedigree of Fuji Kiseki (JPN), brown or black stallion 1992
Sire Sunday Silence (USA) 1986	Halo; 1969	Hail to Reason	Turn-To (IRE)
Sire Sunday Silence (USA) 1986	Halo; 1969	Hail to Reason	Nothirdchance
Sire Sunday Silence (USA) 1986	Halo; 1969	Cosmah	Cosmic Bomb
Sire Sunday Silence (USA) 1986	Halo; 1969	Cosmah	Almahmoud
Sire Sunday Silence (USA) 1986	Wishing Well; 1975	Understanding	Promised Land
Sire Sunday Silence (USA) 1986	Wishing Well; 1975	Understanding	Pretty Ways
Sire Sunday Silence (USA) 1986	Wishing Well; 1975	Mountain Flower	Montparnasse (ARG)
Sire Sunday Silence (USA) 1986	Wishing Well; 1975	Mountain Flower	Edelweiss
Dam Millracer (USA) 1983	Le Fabuleux (FR); 1961	Wild Risk	Rialto
Dam Millracer (USA) 1983	Le Fabuleux (FR); 1961	Wild Risk	Wild Violet
Dam Millracer (USA) 1983	Le Fabuleux (FR); 1961	Anguar	Verso
Dam Millracer (USA) 1983	Le Fabuleux (FR); 1961	Anguar	La Rochelle (USA)
Dam Millracer (USA) 1983	Marston's Mill; 1975	In Reality	Intentionally
Dam Millracer (USA) 1983	Marston's Mill; 1975	In Reality	My Dear Girl
Dam Millracer (USA) 1983	Marston's Mill; 1975	Millicent	Cornish Prince
Dam Millracer (USA) 1983	Marston's Mill; 1975	Millicent	Milan Mill (Family 22-d)

== See also ==
- Agnes Tachyon - 2001 Satsuki Shō winner; shared a similar undefeated career in 4 starts and retiring after a leg injury.
- Jungle Pocket - 2001 Japanese Derby and Japan Cup winner; shared a common owner, trainer, and jockey
