= Sakura Laurel =

Japanese-bred Thoroughbred racehorse

Sakura Laurel サクラローレル
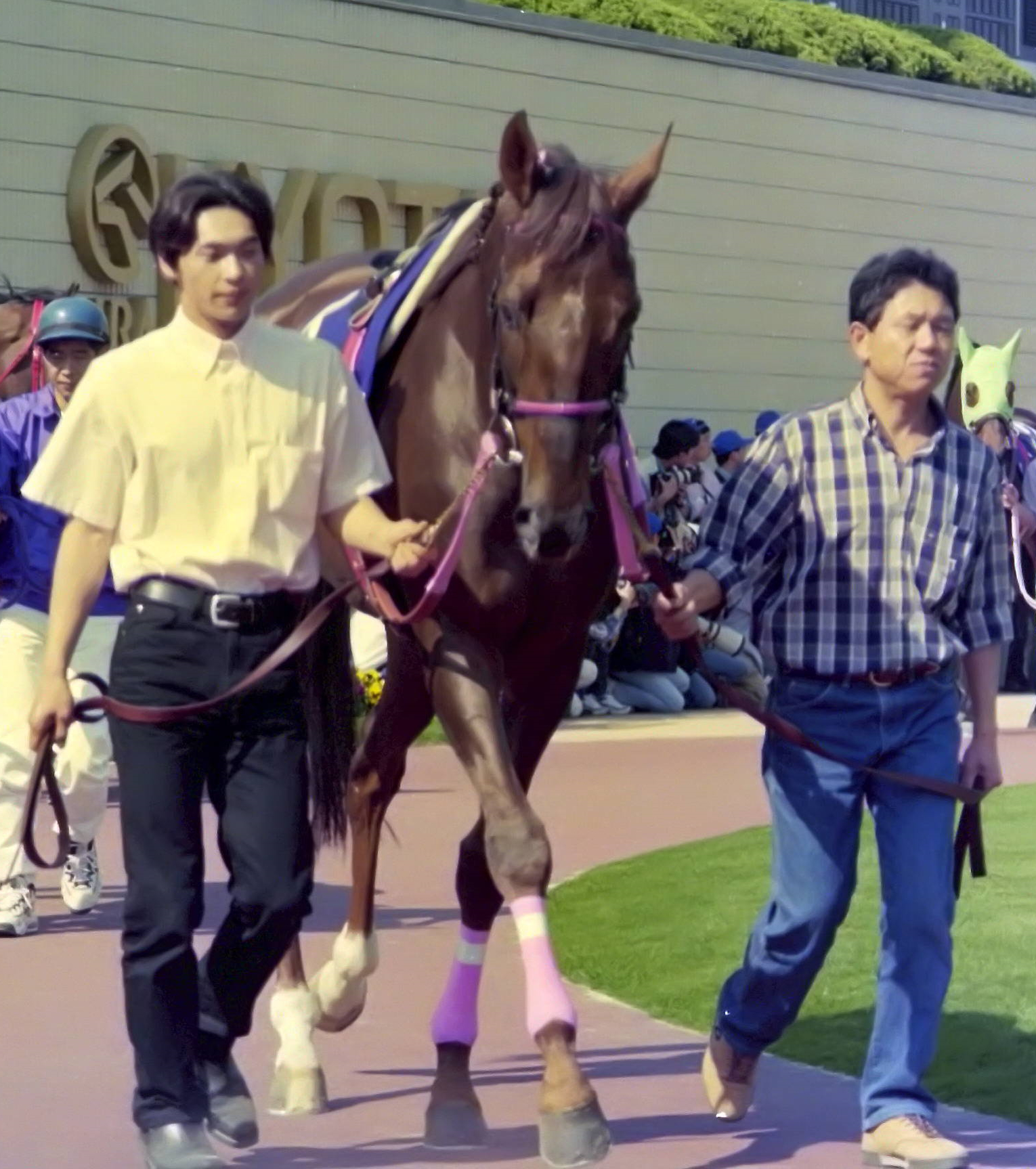
- Sakura Laurel at the 1997 Spring Tennō Shō.
- Breed: Thoroughbred
- Sire: Rainbow Quest (USA)
- Grandsire: Blushing Groom (FR)
- Dam: Lola Lola (FR)
- Damsire: Saint Cyrien (FR)
- Sex: Stallion
- Foaled: May 8, 1991
- Died: January 24, 2020 (aged 28)
- Country: Japan
- Colour: Chestnut
- Breeder: Tanioka Farm Ltd.
- Owner: Sakura Commerce Co.
- Racing colours
- Trainer: Katsutaro Sakai; Futoshi Kojima
- Jockey: Futoshi Kojima; Norihiro Yokoyama
- Record: 22: 9-5-4
- Earnings: ¥626,991,000

Major wins
- Nikkan Sho Sports Kimpai (1995); Nakayama Kinen (1996); Tenno Sho (Spring) (1996); Sankei Sho All Comers (1996); Arima Kinen (1996)

Awards
- Japanese Horse of the Year (1996); JRA Award for Best Older Male Horse (1996)

Sakura Laurel (Japanese: サクラローレル, Hepburn: Sakura Rōreru; 8 May 1991 – 24 January 2020) was a Japanese Thoroughbred racehorse and sire who won the 1996 Spring Tennō Shō and Arima Kinen.

Sakura Laurel was impeded by injuries such as fractures as a three-year-old. In his four-year-old season, he won the 1996 Tenno Sho (Spring) and Arima Kinen and was awarded Japanese Horse of the Year along with the JRA Award for Best Older Male Horse. His other achievements include victories in the 1996 Nakayama Kinen and Sankei Sho All Comers.

== Background ==
Sakura Laurel was foaled out of Lola Lola, a French thoroughbred sired by 1982 Grand Critérium winner Saint Cyrien. Sakura Laurel's sire, Rainbow Quest, won the 1985 Prix de l'Arc de Triomphe. Rainbow Quest was a descendant of Blushing Groom, who won 4 G1 races and became an influential sire and grandsire, siring horses such as Nashwan, who won several major G1 races in the United Kingdom, and Canadian Horse Racing Hall of Fame inductee Runaway Groom. Blushing Groom is a grandsire of successful Japanese racehorses Mayano Top Gun, Matikanefukukitaru and T. M. Opera O.

His dam, Lola Lola, was purchased by Sakura Commerce Co. after being impregnated by Rainbow Quest, and so she was pregnant with a foal before being imported to Japan. After Sakura Laurel was born, he was assigned to trainer Katsutaro Sakai. Sakai, who was present during his birth instantly said, "He was a good horse with very thin, beautiful skin. He had large nostrils and a good physique." Yushi Tanioka of Tanioka Farm quoted, "He was a good horse. He had a lot of grace, and I was confident in his quality. At this point, I had a feeling he would be a big hit in the classic races."

== Racing career ==
=== 1994: three-year-old season ===
Sakura Laurel was a physically weak horse with problems in his hocks. Due to this condition, he performed poorly in his first two races, finishing ninth and third place respectively. Due to his weak legs, the owner decided to try him on a dirt track for his next race. This proved successful as he started in fifth place and moved to the outside in the straight and won by three lengths. After another two races, Sakura Laurel's owner decided to try him again on turf in preparation for the Japanese Derby, where he came sixth. Two weeks later, he ran on dirt again and finished second, three quarters of a length behind Taiki Blizzard. His jockey for that race, Olivier Peslier commented, "The winning horse was certainly strong, but this horse is also strong. Perhaps he's better suited to turf?" Sakura Laurel proved his ability on dirt once again, winning his next race by breaking away early and finishing two and a half lengths ahead.

Sakura Laurel's next race would be the Aoba Sho, a qualifying race for the Derby. In the race, he followed the pack from the back and made a strong run from the inside of the track in the straight. He aimed for the favourite, Air Dublin, but he failed to catch up and finished third. With the third place finish, Sakura Laurel had earned priority entry for the Japanese Derby but he had to pull out at the last minute due to inflammation in the right hind fetlock, possibly caused by Sakura Laurel being made to run in several consecutive races leading up to the Derby. He was given a rest period during the summer to recover.

In the autumn season, Sakura Laurel ran in the Sado Stakes at Niigata in which he finished third. He then ran in the St. Lite Kinen in Nakayama, a qualifying race for the Kikuka Sho, where he finished eighth. The owner decided to enter him in races of lower grades, where he managed to finish second in his next two races at Tokyo Racecourse. Sakura Laurel was then assigned as a companion horse for Sakura Bakushin O who was competing in the Mile Championship. In the Hirasan Tokubetsu, he started from the back and broke away in the straight to win by two lengths, marking his third win in his career. He then returned to the Kanto region in the Toji Stakes, where he took the lead from the third corner and won by two lengths. Due to his good performance, the owner decided to re-enter Sakura Laurel into major races.

=== 1995: four-year-old season ===
Sakura Laurel started the year by joining Nikkan Sports Sho Kimpai, a G3 races in Nakayama. From the start, while the frontrunners ran at a high pace, he chased the middle of the pack. He made a move from the outside at the third corner, absorbed the stalling leaders, and passed Offside Trap in second place at the final corner. He stretched out in the straight and pulled away from Offside Trap, finishing alone and two and a half lengths ahead of the rest. This was his third consecutive win and a first major title.

He then ran in Meguro Kinen with a goal as preparation for Tenno Sho (Spring). On the race, he waited mostly in the middle and started his spurt at the beginning of the third corner. At the final corner, he was at the lead before being overtaken by Hagino Real King who ended up winning in a record time whereas Sakura Laurel finished in second, a neck behind. Futoshi Kojima who rode her in that race quoted, "I don't think my move was too early. But when I was going left, the way I changed positions was a little awkward". On April 23, He was moved to Ritto Training Centre for Tenno Sho Spring preparation. During those time, he suffered a fracture of third metacarpal bone on both of his front legs. His trainer, Sakai refused to give up on this horse even though the diagnosis was so bad and almost forcing Sakura Laurel to retire from racing. This injury subsided him for the whole remaining season as he recuperated.

=== 1996: five-year-old season ===
Sakura Laurel returned to training in March 10, this time for Nakayama Kinen. His main jockey, Futoshi Kojima retired and Norihiro Yokoyama was appointed as his replacement. When the race started, He mostly sit at third from the back of the pack and started advancing from the third corner. In the final corner, he moved to the outside of the leaders and made a strong comeback. The favourite, Genuine and the 14th-favorite, Pegasus were trying to break away from the inside, but Yokoyama used his finishing speed to overtake them from the outside, and Yokoyama eased off the reins to cross the finish line in the lead. He won his second graded races by one and three-quarters of a length. The 384-day gap between graded races won was the second-longest in history, behind Suzuki Parade's 461-day gap.

He continued the momentum by racing in the race he missed last year which was Tenno Sho Spring. Heading into the race, he was the third favourite behind two horses of the year, Narita Brian and Mayano Top Gun. Starting from the first position in the first gate, Sakura Laurel ran in the middle of the pack, closely following Narita Brian. Amid a slow pace, Narita Brian made a move on the far side of the pack on the second lap, closing in on the leading Mayano Top Gun, and the two horses were side-by-side before the final corner. He then followed the duo closely into the final corner. Narita Brian took the lead in the final straight before Sakura Laurel unleashed his finishing burst from behind and passed him, widening the gap and took home the win. Yokoyama reminisced, "I rode Sakura Laurel with confidence. I think one of the reasons for the victory was that I was able to get close to (Narita) Brian at the fourth (final) corner. He used his finishing kick better than I expected. In the straight, he had more explosive power than his opponent. When I passed (Narita) Brian, I was sure of victory."

A withdrawal from Takarazuka Kinen after that race was surely in the books as the owner did not want to push him too much with congested schedule. The rest of the calendar decided by only participated in another three races - Sankei Sho All Comers, Tenno Sho (Autumn) and Arima Kinen. In September, Sakura Laurel ran excellently in the Sankei Sho All Comers. He started well in the middle and broke away on the inside and extending the lead from all runners including Mayano Top Gun to win the race. His excellent form giving confidence for the owners in the next race, Tenno Sho Autumn. In this race, he got off to a slow start. Although he made some pushes from the outside in the straight, he was unable to secure a clear path at the crucial moment. After moving to the inside, he made some progress, but was more than half a length behind the leading Bubble Gum Fellow, finishing third. Sakai thought Yokoyama rushed the opening and Yokoyama agreed that he rode the horse badly that day.

Following the plan, Sakura Laurel next race would be the Arima Kinen on December 22. This race ceremoniously generated the highest sales in history with a whopping total of 87,510,424,000 yen, which later became a Guinness World Record for single-race sales. In the race, he started from sixth position and like usual, chasing in the middle pack. He managed to find a path outside around Marvelous Sunday as he passed the final corner. In the final straight, it was a three horse battle between Mayano Top Gun, Marvelous Sunday and Sakura Laurel in which Sakura Laurel ran alone from the outside and surged forward to win the Arima Kinen. This is the first win in Arima Kinen for all parties involved (Yokoyama, Sakai and Sakura Commerce). A fantastic season by Sakura Laurel with four wins out of five races including two G1 wins earned him Japanese Horse of the Year and also JRA Award for Best Older Male Horse. He was voted unanimously on the older horse award.

=== 1997: six-year-old season ===
Sakura Laurel did not start well in the new year as he was injured on the fetlock part again during the off season. He was supposed to be a part of Prix de l'Arc de Triomphe squad that year but the injury dismissed him. He was rested until the Tenno Sho Spring. As usual, he stuck in the middle of the pack from the start of the race and changed her gear in the third corner. The three horse battle in previous Arima Kinen happened again but this time it was Mayano Top Gun who managed to pull out the victory. This result convinced the owner to send her for Arc expedition in France. He was put on Prix Foy as a warmup for the Arc but even with Yutaka Take on the helm, he finished last in that race. Take immediately dismounted after the race and a detailed examination the following day, September 15, revealed a partial rupture of the right front flexor tendon. This injury forced him to retire immediately. His retirement ceremony was held in Nakayama after he returned on December 20.

== Racing form ==
The following racing form is based on information available on JBIS search,, netkeiba.com, and irishracing.com.

Date	Track	Race	Grade	Distance (Condition)	Entry	HN	Odds (Favored)	Finish	Time	Margins	Jockey	Winner (Runner-up)
1994 – three-year-old season
Jan 6	Nakayama	3YO debut		1600m（Firm）	15	7	1.8（1）	9th	1:37.9	1.0	Futoshi Kojima	Shine Ford
Jan 15	Nakayama	3YO debut		1600m（Soft）	13	13	6.7（2）	3rd	1:37.8	0.7	Futoshi Kojima	Matsu Brillante
Jan 30	Tokyo	3YO Maiden		1400m（Sloppy）	14	6	2.7（1）	1st	1:26.6	–0.5	Futoshi Kojima	(Cyclennon Volk)
Feb 19	Tokyo	Haruna Sho	ALW (1W)	1600m（Firm）	12	10	8.6（4）	6th	1:35.9	0.4	Futoshi Kojima	Indeed Slew
Mar 6	Nakayama	3YO Allowance	ALW (1W)	1800m（Fast）	7	3	4.4（2）	2nd	1:54.1	0.1	Olivier Peslier	Taiki Blizzard
Mar 26	Nakayama	3YO Allowance	ALW (1W)	1800m（Fast）	10	7	1.2（1）	1st	1:53.9	–0.4	Futoshi Kojima	(Candle Time)
Apr 30	Tokyo	Aoba Sho	3	2400m（Firm）	17	9	7.1（3）	3rd	2:28.9	0.1	Futoshi Kojima	Air Dublin
Sep 4	Niigata	Sado Stakes		2000m（Firm）	9	5	3.4（2）	3rd	2:01.3	0.6	Futoshi Kojima	Daigo Soul
Sep 25	Nakayama	St Lite Kinen	2	2200m（Soft）	11	9	2.9（2）	8th	2:17.0	1.1	Futoshi Kojima	Wind Fields
Oct 15	Tokyo	Rokusha Tokubetsu		1800m（Firm）	9	6	1.2（1）	2nd	1:47.5	0.3	Futoshi Kojima	Birthroot
Oct 30	Tokyo	Shukyo Tokubetsu		2000m（Firm）	10	6	1.4（1）	2nd	2:01.5	0.1	Futoshi Kojima	Brand Michele
Nov 20	Kyoto	Hirasan Tokubetsu		2200m（Firm）	7	1	1.5（1）	1st	2:14.1	–0.3	Futoshi Kojima	(Mejiro Suzumaru)
Dec 18	Nakayama	Toji Stakes		2500m（Firm）	14	14	2.1（1）	1st	2:33.5	–0.3	Futoshi Kojima	(Hayate Magician)
1995 – four-year-old season
Jan 5	Nakayama	Nakayama Kimpai	3	2000m（Soft）	16	11	4.9（2）	1st	2:00.5	–0.4	Futoshi Kojima	(Golden Eye)
Feb 19	Tokyo	Meguro Kinen	2	2500m（Firm）	12	4	1.5（1）	2nd	2:31.2	0.1	Futoshi Kojima	Hagino Real King
1996 – five-year-old season
Mar 10	Nakayama	Nakayama Kinen	2	1800m（Firm）	15	5	19.5（9）	1st	1:47.2	–0.3	Norihiro Yokoyama	(Genuine)
Apr 21	Kyoto	Tenno Sho (Spring)	1	3200m（Firm）	16	1	14.5（3）	1st	3:17.8	–0.4	Norihiro Yokoyama	(Narita Brian)
Sep 15	Nakayama	Sankei Sho All Comers	2	2200m（Soft）	9	9	1.9（2）	1st	2:16.7	–0.4	Norihiro Yokoyama	(Fashion Show)
Oct 27	Tokyo	Tenno Sho (Autumn)	1	2000m（Firm）	17	16	2.5（1）	3rd	1:58.9	0.2	Norihiro Yokoyama	Bubble Gum Fellow
Dec 22	Nakayama	Arima Kinen	1	2500m（Firm）	14	6	2.2（1）	1st	2:33.8	–0.4	Norihiro Yokoyama	(Marvelous Sunday)
1997 – six-year-old season
Apr 27	Kyoto	Tenno Sho (Spring)	1	3200m（Firm）	16	8	2.1（1）	2nd	3:14.6	0.2	Norihiro Yokoyama	Mayano Top Gun
Sep 14	Longchamp	Prix Foy	3	2400m（Soft）	8	1	2/1（1）	8th	2:32.3	0.5	Yutaka Take	Yokohama

Legend:
Turf Dirt

== Stud record and death ==
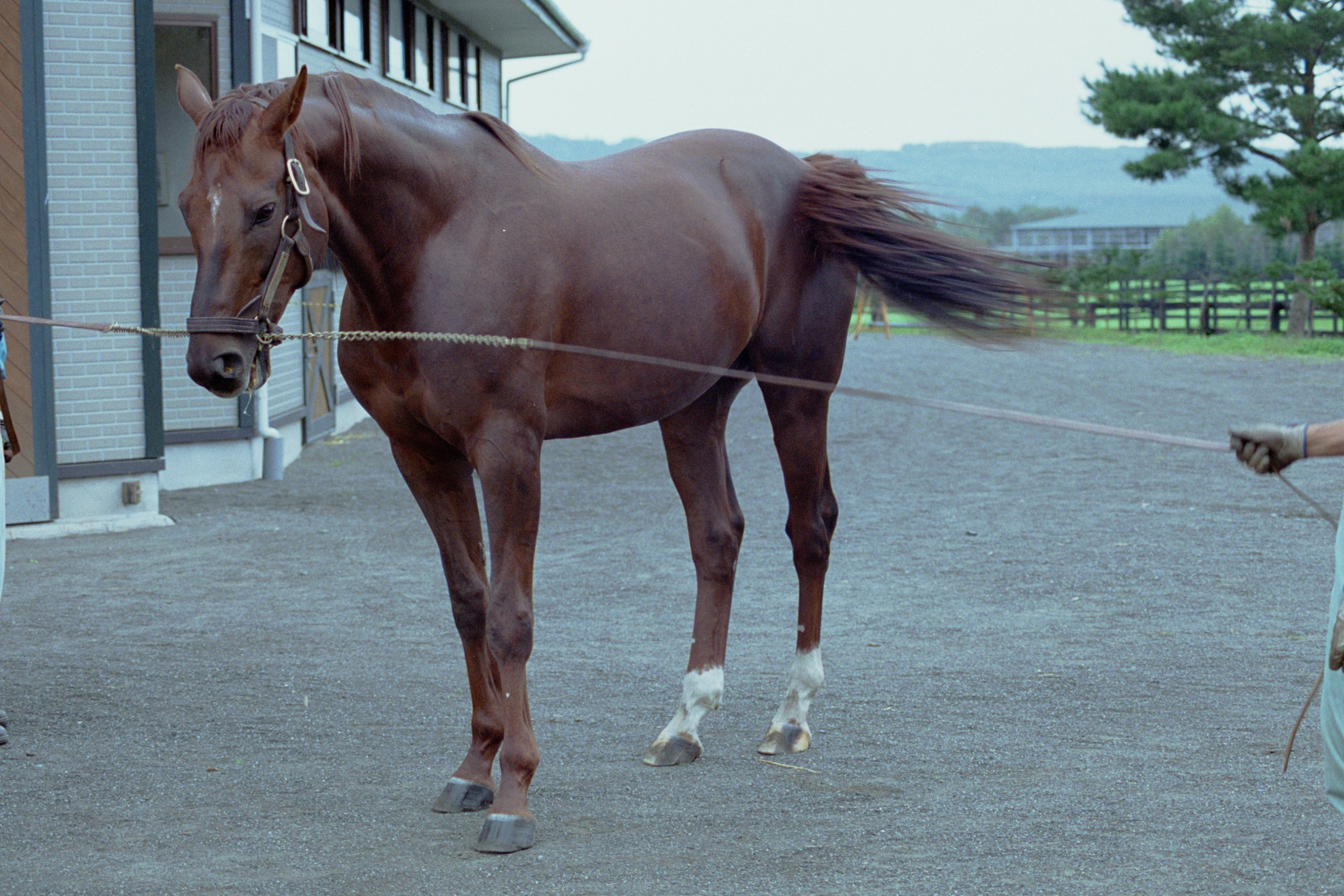
Sakura Laurel in 2000

After his retirement, Sakura Laurel stood as a stud at Shizunai Stallion Station. He later moved to Arrow Stud in 2005 as Shizunai Stallion Station was closed in 2004. Then, he moved to Shinwa farm in 2010 and retired as stud in 2012.

Sakura Laurel stayed at Shinwa farm and died on the morning of 24 January 2020, due to old age. He was 29.

=== Major winners ===
c = colt, f = filly

Grade winners
Foaled	Name	Sex	Major Wins
1999	Roman Empire	c	Keisei Hai
2000	Shinko Ruby	f	Flora Stakes
2000	Sakura Century	c	Copa Republica Argentina, Nikkei Shinshun Hai
2004	Long Pride	c	Unicorn Stakes

== In popular culture ==
An anthropomorphized version of Sakura Laurel appears as a character in the Japanese multimedia franchise Umamusume: Pretty Derby, voiced by Mizuki Mano. She is depicted as gentle, optimistic, and deeply ambitious girl with unwavering persistence, despite her fragile body, and a fascination for French culture. She has a particular obsession with Narita Brian, and dreams of defeating her and racing in the Prix de l'Arc de Triomphe. A manga featuring a dramatized depiction of Sakura Laurel's real-life racing career titled Umamusume: Pretty Derby – Star Blossom began serialization in 2023.

== Pedigree ==
Pedigree of Sakura Laurel (JPN), dark chestnut horse, 1991
Sire Rainbow Quest (USA) 1981	Blushing Groom (FR); 1974	Red God	Nasrullah
Sire Rainbow Quest (USA) 1981	Blushing Groom (FR); 1974	Red God	Spring Run
Sire Rainbow Quest (USA) 1981	Blushing Groom (FR); 1974	Runaway Bride	Wild Risk
Sire Rainbow Quest (USA) 1981	Blushing Groom (FR); 1974	Runaway Bride	Aimee
Sire Rainbow Quest (USA) 1981	I Will Follow (USA); 1975	Herbager	Vandale
Sire Rainbow Quest (USA) 1981	I Will Follow (USA); 1975	Herbager	Flagette
Sire Rainbow Quest (USA) 1981	I Will Follow (USA); 1975	Where You Lead	Raise a Native
Sire Rainbow Quest (USA) 1981	I Will Follow (USA); 1975	Where You Lead	Noblesse
Dam Lola Lola (FR) 1985	Saint Cyrien (FR); 1980	Luthier	Klairon
Dam Lola Lola (FR) 1985	Saint Cyrien (FR); 1980	Luthier	Flute Enchantee
Dam Lola Lola (FR) 1985	Saint Cyrien (FR); 1980	Sevres	Riverman
Dam Lola Lola (FR) 1985	Saint Cyrien (FR); 1980	Sevres	Saratoga
Dam Lola Lola (FR) 1985	Bold Lady (IRE); 1974	Bold Lad	Bold Ruler
Dam Lola Lola (FR) 1985	Bold Lady (IRE); 1974	Bold Lad	Misty Morn
Dam Lola Lola (FR) 1985	Bold Lady (IRE); 1974	Tredam	High Treason
Dam Lola Lola (FR) 1985	Bold Lady (IRE); 1974	Tredam	Damasi

- Family Number : 14
- Sakura Laurel is inbred 4 x 5 to Nasrullah (Bold Ruler sire).
