= Mejiro Bright =

Japanese-bred Thoroughbred racehorse

Mejiro Bright メジロブライト
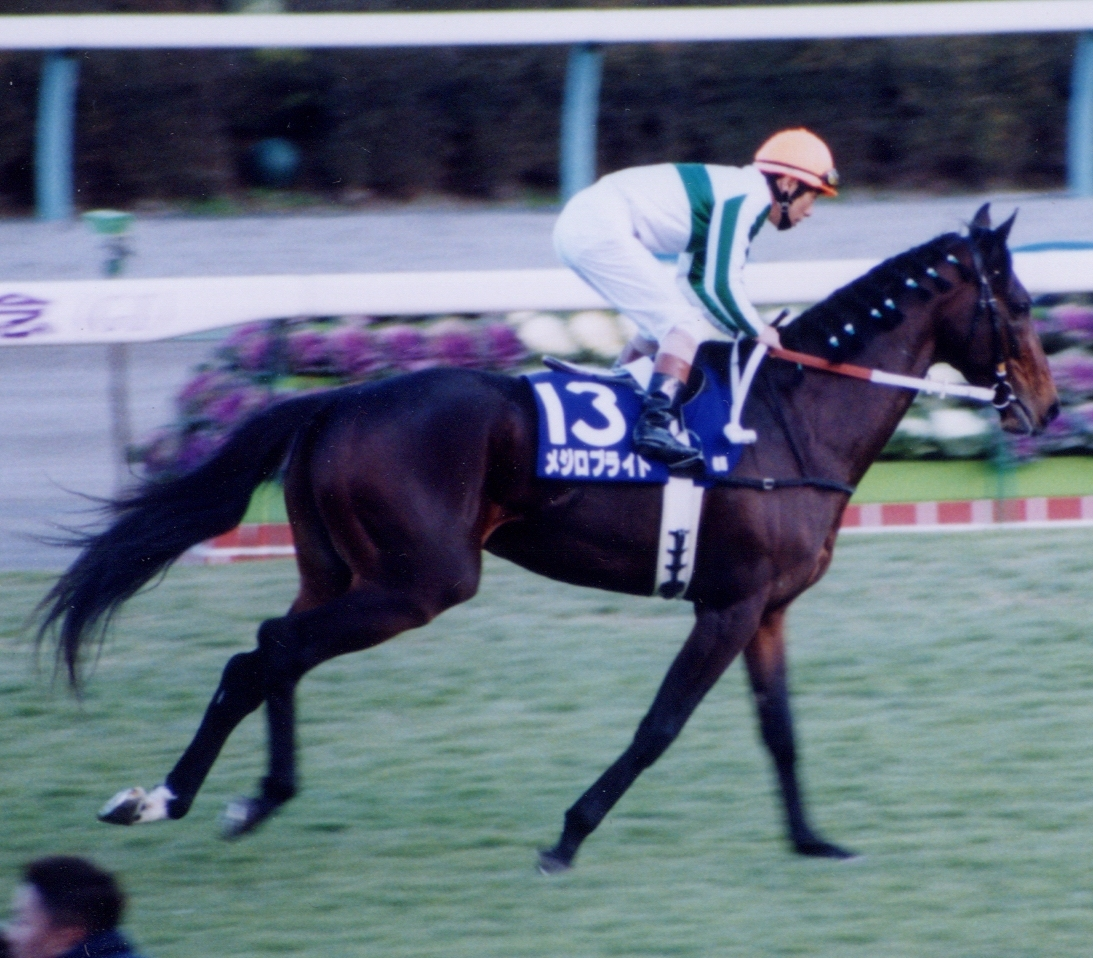
- Mejiro Bright in December 26, 1999 at Nakayama Racecourse.
- Breed: Thoroughbred
- Sire: Mejiro Ryan
- Grandsire: Amber Shadai
- Dam: Reru du Temps
- Damsire: Maruzensky
- Sex: Stallion
- Foaled: April 19, 1994
- Died: May 16, 2004 (aged 10)
- Country: Japan
- Colour: Bay
- Breeder: Mejiro Stud.
- Owner: Mejiro Farm Co. Ltd.
- Racing colours
- Trainer: Kuniichi Asami → Shuichi Asami
- Jockey: Teruhiko Chida → Yoshikazu Yokoyama → Mikio Matsunaga → Hiroshi Kawachi → Mamoru Ishibashi
- Record: 25: 8-8-3
- Earnings: ¥ 832,587,000

Major wins
- Radio Tampa Hai Stakes (1996); Kyodo News Service Hai Yonsai Stakes (1996); Stayers Stakes (1997); American JCC (1998); Hanshin Daishōten (1998); Tennō Shō (Spring) (1998); Nikkei Shinshun Hai (1999)

Awards
- JRA Best Horse By Home-Bred Sire (1998)
- Last updated on 18 December 2025

Mejiro Bright (Japanese: メジロブライト, Hepburn: Mejiro Buraito; April 19, 1994 – May 16, 2004) was a Japanese Thoroughbred racehorse and sire.

Mejiro Bright won the JRA Award for Best Horse by Home-Bred Sire in 1998, and also won the Tennō Shō (Spring) in the same year. He was called "the second Ryan" in reference to his sire. His other major wins include the 1996 Radio Tampa Hai 3-Year-Old Stakes (GIII), the 1997 Stayers Stakes (GII) and Kyodo News Service Hai 4-Year-Old Stakes (GIII), the 1998 American Jockey Club Cup (GII) and Hanshin Daishōten (GII), and the 1999 Nikkei Shinshun Hai (GII).

He is the half-brother of Mejiro Bailey (sired by Sunday Silence), who won the 2000 JRA Award for Best 3-Year-Old Colt. Mejiro Bright is also known as the sire of Makihata Cyborg, the winner of the 2007 Stayers Stakes. He is also the half-brother of Mejiro Monet (sired by Mogami), who was a member of the Japan Racing Association and Takasaki Racecourse, finishing second in the 1996 Musashino Stakes, second and third in the 1993 and 1995 Winter Stakes respectively, and second, third and third in the Takasaki Daishoten from 1998 to 2000.

== Background ==
Mejiro Bright was born out of Mejiro Ryan and Reru du Temps, a mare out of Maruzensky. Maruzensky was undefeated in the eight races he ran in from 1976 to 1977. However, at the time foreign-born horses could not run in Japanese races such as the Japanese Triple Crown, and because of this, his success was limited. Despite this, Maruzensky was inducted into the JRA Hall of Fame in 1990.

Mejiro Bright's sire, Mejiro Ryan, won the 1991 Takarazuka Kinen. Mejiro Ryan was also one part of the "New Triumvirate" with Mejiro McQueen and Whitestone, replacing the Heisei Triumvirate which consisted of Oguri Cap, Super Creek and Inari One. Mejiro Ryan also sired Mejiro Dober who would go on to win five GI races.

Under the care of trainer Kuniichi Asami, who was nearing retirement, he became a racehorse and won a maiden race over 1,800 meters on turf at Hakodate Racecourse in the summer of his third year. He then withdrew from racing due to a worsening sore throat, but in his return race at the end of his third year, he won the Radio Tampa Hai Sansai Stakes.

Following Kuniichi's retirement, Asami's son, Shuichi, took charge of the four-year-old classics. Like his father, he suffered repeated close losses in the races, losing to Sunny Brian and Matikanefukukitaru and finishing without a classic title. That same year, he won the Stayers Stakes by a wide margin. After winning the American Jockey Club Cup in his first race of 1998, he advanced to the Hanshin Daishōten, where he defeated fellow Arima Kinen winner Silk Justice in a one-on-one battle for his third consecutive victory. He then went on to win the Tennō Shō (Spring), beating Silk Justice and Stay Gold to claim four consecutive graded races. This was Mejiro Farm's seventh Tennō Shō victory since Mejiro McQueen. That same year, he was awarded the JRA Award for Best Home-Bred Sire.

He continued to run well thereafter, only missing out on a place finish three times until his retirement. However, he was prevented from taking first place by imported stallions Silence Suzuka, Seiun Sky, and Special Week, as well as foreign-bred horse Grass Wonder, and was unable to win any more graded titles. In total, he won 8 of 25 races, earning prize money of over 800 million yen.

After retiring, he became a stallion at Arrow Stud. However, in his fourth year he was sold to Big Red Farm, where he died suddenly of a heart attack shortly after at the age of 10. His offspring include Makihata Cyborg, who won the 2007 Stayers Stakes (GII).

== Racing statistics ==
Data taken from Netkeiba.

Date	Age	Track	Race	Grade	Distance	Entry	Odds (Favored)	Finish	Time	Margins	Jockey	Winner (Runner-up)	Prize (¥ mil)
1996/08/31	2	Hakodate	Three-Year-Old Newcomer	Maiden	T 1800m	3	58.9 (6)	1	2:01.6	-0.1	T. Chida	(Palm Shadow)	5.9
1996/09/22	2	Hakodate	Suzuran Shō	OP	T 1800m	1	3.9 (2)	2	1:51.5	0.2	Y. Yokoyama	Spring Diana	6.06
1996/10/19	2	Kyōto	Daily Hai Sansai Stakes	G3	T 1400m	10	28.5 (7)	2	1:22.1	0.8	M. Matsunaga	Seeking the Pearl	15.17
1996/12/21	2	Hanshin	Radio Tampa Hai Sansai Stakes	G3	T 2000m	7	3.9 (2)	1	2:03.1	-0.3	M. Matsunaga	(Brave Tender)	32.56
1997/02/09	3	Tokyo	Kyodo Tsushin Hai	G3	T 1800m	13	1.6 (1)	1	1:47.5	-0.1	M. Matsunaga	(Seiryu O)	42.5
1997/03/16	3	Nakayama	Spring Stakes	G2	T 1800m	5	1.4 (1)	2	1:52.3	0.1	M. Matsunaga	Big Sunday	22.3
1997/04/13	3	Nakayama	Satsuki Shō	G1	T 2000m	8	2.9 (1)	4	2:02.2	0.2	M. Matsunaga	Sunny Brian	15
1997/06/01	3	Tokyo	Tōkyō Yūshun	G1	T 2400m	15	2.4 (1)	3	2:26.2	0.3	M. Matsunaga	Sunny Brian	37.82
1997/10/12	3	Kyoto	Kyoto Shimbun Hai	G2	T 2200m	6	3.4 (2)	3	2:13.3	0.2	M. Matsunaga	Matikanefukukitaru	14.13
1997/11/02	3	Kyoto	Kikuka Shō	G1	T 3000m	14	3.8 (2)	3	3:07.9	0.2	M. Matsunaga	Matikanefukukitaru	33.5
1997/11/29	3	Nakayama	Stayers Stakes	G2	T 3600m	12	1.6 (1)	1	3:48.7	-1.8	H. Kawachi	(Admire Lapis)	65.06
1998/01/25	4	Nakayama	American Jockey Club Cup	G2	T 2200m	3	1.8 (1)	1	2:15.3	-0.4	H. Kawachi	(Meiner Bridge)	64.94
1998/03/22	4	Hanshin	Hanshin Daishōten	G2	T 3000m	3	1.4 (1)	1	3:09.3	0.0	H. Kawachi	(Silk Justice)	64.78
1998/05/03	4	Kyoto	Tennō Shō (Spring)	G1	T 3200m	5	2.3 (2)	1	3:23.6	-0.3	H. Kawachi	(Stay Gold)	135.19
1998/07/12	4	Hanshin	Takarazuka Kinen	G1	T 2200m	2	3.2 (2)	11	2:13.2	1.3	H. Kawachi	Silence Suzuka	None
1998/10/11	4	Kyoto	Kyōto Daishōten	G2	T 2400m	3	2.3 (1)	2	2:25.7	0.1	H. Kawachi	Seiun Sky	26.18
1998/11/01	4	Tokyo	Tennō Shō (Autumn)	G1	T 2000m	2	6.2 (2)	5	2:00.1	0.8	H. Kawachi	Offside Trap	13.2
1998/12/27	4	Nakayama	Arima Kinen	G1	T 2500m	10	5.3 (3)	2	2:32.2	0.1	H. Kawachi	Grass Wonder	54
1999/01/24	5	Kyoto	Nikkei Shinshun Hai	G2	T 2400m	11	2.1 (1)	1	2:31.4	0.0	H. Kawachi	(Emocion)	64.92
1999/03/21	5	Hanshin	Hanshin Daishōten	G2	T 3000m	8	1.7 (1)	2	3:13.5	0.1	H. Kawachi	Special Week	26.21
1999/05/02	5	Kyoto	Tennō Shō (Spring)	G1	T 3200m	10	4.1 (3)	2	3:15.4	0.1	H. Kawachi	Special Week	53.76
1999/10/10	5	Kyoto	Kyōto Daishōten	G2	T 2400m	6	3.4 (2)	2	2:24.4	0.1	H. Kawachi	Tsurumaru Tsuyoshi	26.21
1999/10/31	5	Tokyo	Tennō Shō (Autumn)	G1	T 2000m	4	6.8 (3)	11	1:59.1	1.1	H. Kawachi	Special Week	None
1999/12/26	5	Nakayama	Arima Kinen	G1	T 2500m	13	6.5 (3)	5	2:37.5	0.3	H. Kawachi	Grass Wonder	13.2
2000/10/08	6	Kyoto	Kyōto Daishōten	G2	T 2400m	6	22.2 (5)	8	2:27.0	1.0	M. Ishibashi	T.M. Opera O	None

- T in the table means "Turf"

== In popular culture ==
An anthropomorphized version of Mejiro Bright appears as a character in the Japanese multimedia franchise Umamusume: Pretty Derby, voiced by Kika Onishi. She is depicted as a laid-back and airheaded girl who tends to react slower than normal in circumstances outside of racing. While she has rather minimal expectations for herself in comparison to the other members of the Mejiro family, she is exceptionally patient and emotionally intelligent, seen through her attentiveness and care for her sister, Mejiro Dober.

== Pedigree ==
Pedigree of Mejiro Bright (JPN), bay stallion, 1994
Sire Mejiro Ryan (JPN)	Amber Shadai (JPN)	Northern Taste (CAN)	Northern Dancer (CAN)
Sire Mejiro Ryan (JPN)	Amber Shadai (JPN)	Northern Taste (CAN)	Lady Victoria (CAN)
Sire Mejiro Ryan (JPN)	Amber Shadai (JPN)	Clear Amber (USA)	Ambiopoise (USA)
Sire Mejiro Ryan (JPN)	Amber Shadai (JPN)	Clear Amber (USA)	One Clear Call (USA)
Sire Mejiro Ryan (JPN)	Mejiro Chaser (JPN)	Mejiro Samman (JPN)	Charlottesville (GB)
Sire Mejiro Ryan (JPN)	Mejiro Chaser (JPN)	Mejiro Samman (JPN)	Paradisea (GB)
Sire Mejiro Ryan (JPN)	Mejiro Chaser (JPN)	Cheryl (FR)	Snob (FR)
Sire Mejiro Ryan (JPN)	Mejiro Chaser (JPN)	Cheryl (FR)	Chanel (FR)
Dam Reru du Temps (JPN)	Maruzensky (JPN)	Nijinsky (CAN)	Northern Dancer (CAN)
Dam Reru du Temps (JPN)	Maruzensky (JPN)	Nijinsky (CAN)	Flaming Page (CAN)
Dam Reru du Temps (JPN)	Maruzensky (JPN)	Shill (USA)	Buckpasser (USA)
Dam Reru du Temps (JPN)	Maruzensky (JPN)	Shill (USA)	Quill (USA)
Dam Reru du Temps (JPN)	Kei Tsunami (JPN)	Ladiga (USA)	Graustark (USA)
Dam Reru du Temps (JPN)	Kei Tsunami (JPN)	Ladiga (USA)	Celia (USA)
Dam Reru du Temps (JPN)	Kei Tsunami (JPN)	Hibiscus (JPN)	Admiral Byrd (GB)
Dam Reru du Temps (JPN)	Kei Tsunami (JPN)	Hibiscus (JPN)	Kikuju Hime (JPN)
