= Mill George =

American thoroughbred racehorse

- Breed: Thoroughbred
- Sire: Mill Reef
- Grandsire: Never Bend
- Dam: Miss Charisma
- Damsire: Ragusa
- Sex: Stallion
- Foaled: April 12th, 1975
- Died: October 7, 2007
- Breeder: Warnerton Farms
- Owner: K. Nakamura
- Trainer: A. T. Doyle
- Jockey: D. G. McHargue
- Record: 4:2-0-1
- Earnings: $17,350

Mill George (April 12, 1975 – October 19, 2007) is an American Thoroughbred racehorse who is known for his stud career.

== Career ==
Mill George is the foal of Mill Reef, a racehorse with multiple stakes wins, and Miss Charisma.

His first race was on February 5, 1978, where he came in 7th place at Santa Anita.

Mill George raced three more races, two of which were wins at Santa Anita and Hollywood Park, because suffering a fracture. The injury ended his career and he was exported to Japan as a stallion.

== Stud career ==
Mill George had a successful stud career, where he was the leading sire of Japan in 1989. He retired from stallion duties in 1999 and died on October 19, 2007. His progenies include the following:

c = colt, f = filly
Bold = Grade 1 stakes

**Foaled**	**Name**	**Sex**	**Major Wins**
1980	Mill Top	c	Oka Sho
1981	Ebisu George	c	Tokyo Shimbun Hai
1981	Rocky Tiger	c	Teio Sho, Tokyo Okan Sho, Diolite Kinen, Tokyo Kinen
1982	Super Gura Third	c	Niigata Daishoten
1982	Mill Koji	c	Tokyo Derby
1982	Subic Maggy	c	Tokyo Sansai Yushun Himba
1982	Yukino Rose	c	Flora Stakes, Nakayama Himba Stakes
1984	Daitaku Genius	f	Tokyo Princess Sho, Urawa Kinen, Kiyofuji Kinen
1984	Mogami Yashima	c	NHK Hai
1983	Shinano George	c	Tokyo Kinen, Kuroshio Hai, Nippon TV Hai, Hakusan Daishoten
1984	George Rex	c	Tokyo Derby
1984	Inari One	c	Tokyo Okan Sho, Tokyo Daishoten, **Tenno Sho (Spring)**, **Takarazuka Kinen**, **Arima Kinen**
1985	Mr. Cyclennon	c	Naruo Kinen, Diamond Stakes
1985	Honin Megohime	c	Nippon TV Hai, Queen Sho
1985	George Monarch	c	Sankei Sho All Comers
1985	Yuwa Forte	c	Niigata Daishoten
1986	Osaichi George	c	**Takarazuka Kinen**
1986	Happy Guinness	c	Negishi Stakes
1986	Mill Yuji	c	Zen-Nippon Nisai Yushun, Heiwa Sho
1986	Rosita	c	Tokyo Derby, Haneda Hai, Tokyo Daishoten, Kawasaki Kinen, Oka Sho, Tokyo Okan Sho, Keihin Hai
1987	Center Shokatsu	c	Kobe Shimbun Hai
1987	Eishin Sunny	f	**Yushun Himba**
1987	Uto George	c	NHK Hai
1988	Rinden Lily	f	**Queen Elizabeth II Cup**, Rose Stakes
1989	Tsukino Ichiban	c	Kinpai, After 5 Star Sho
1991	Yashima Sovereign	c	Radio Nikkei Sho
1991	Noble Grass	c	Hakodate Sprint Stakes
1992	George Taisei	c	Tokyo Derby
1993	Yusei Top Run	c	Copa Republica Argentina, Diamond Stakes
1996	Swing By	f	Twinkle Lady Sho, First Lady Sho

In addition, Mill George is the damsire of Satsuki Sho and Kikuka Sho winner Seiun Sky as well as Shadow Silhouette, the dam of Oju Chosan.

== Pedigree ==
Pedigree of Mill George (USA), 1975
Sire Mill Reef (USA) 1968	Never Bend (USA); 1960	Nasrullah	Nearco
Sire Mill Reef (USA) 1968	Never Bend (USA); 1960	Nasrullah	Mumtaz Begum
Sire Mill Reef (USA) 1968	Never Bend (USA); 1960	Lalun	Djeddah
Sire Mill Reef (USA) 1968	Never Bend (USA); 1960	Lalun	Be Faithful
Sire Mill Reef (USA) 1968	Milan Mill (USA); 1962	Princequillo	Prince Rose
Sire Mill Reef (USA) 1968	Milan Mill (USA); 1962	Princequillo	Cosquilla
Sire Mill Reef (USA) 1968	Milan Mill (USA); 1962	Virginia Water	Count Fleet
Sire Mill Reef (USA) 1968	Milan Mill (USA); 1962	Virginia Water	Red Ray
Dam Miss Charisma (GB) 1967	Ragusa (IRE); 1960	Ribot	Tenerani
Dam Miss Charisma (GB) 1967	Ragusa (IRE); 1960	Ribot	Romanella
Dam Miss Charisma (GB) 1967	Ragusa (IRE); 1960	Fantan	Ambiorix
Dam Miss Charisma (GB) 1967	Ragusa (IRE); 1960	Fantan	Red Eye
Dam Miss Charisma (GB) 1967	Matatina (GB); 1960	Grey Sovereign	Nasrullah
Dam Miss Charisma (GB) 1967	Matatina (GB); 1960	Grey Sovereign	Kong
Dam Miss Charisma (GB) 1967	Matatina (GB); 1960	Zanzara	Fairey Fulmar
Dam Miss Charisma (GB) 1967	Matatina (GB); 1960	Zanzara	Sunright
