= Inari One =

Japanese-bred Thoroughbred racehorse

Inari One イナリワン
- Inari One racing at the 1989 Arima Kinen.
- Breed: Thoroughbred
- Sire: Mill George (USA)
- Grandsire: Mill Reef (USA)
- Dam: Teito Yashima (JPN)
- Damsire: Larkspur (IRE)
- Sex: Stallion
- Foaled: May 7, 1984
- Died: February 7, 2016 (aged 31)
- Country: Japan
- Colour: Bay
- Breeder: Yamamoto Migi
- Owner: Hiroki Hotehama
- Racing colors
- Trainer: Fumio Fukunaga; Kiyoshi Suzuki
- Jockey: Masayuki Miyaura; Yutaka Take; Masato Shibata
- Record: 25: 12–3–2
- Earnings: 509,326,400 JPY

Major wins
- Tokyo Okan Sho (1987); Tokyo Daishoten (1988); Tenno Sho (Spring) (1989); Takarazuka Kinen (1989); Arima Kinen (1989)

Awards
- Japanese Horse of the Year (1989); JRA Award for Best Older Male Horse (1989)

Inari One (Japanese: イナリワン, Hepburn: Inari Wan; 7 May 1984 – 7 February 2016) was a Japanese Thoroughbred racehorse and sire. Initially a successful racer running local-level races on dirt courses, he was later entered into national level turf races as a five year old. He won major grade 1 races, including the 1989 Spring Tenno Sho, Takarazuka Kinen, and Arima Kinen. He was voted both Japanese Horse of the Year and Best Older Male Horse in 1989 for his successes. Inari One was part of the "Heisei Big Three," along with Oguri Cap and Super Creek, who helped to renew interest in horse racing in Japan in the late 1980s.

== Background ==
Inari One was foaled 7 May 1984 at Yamamoto Migi's ranch in Monbetsu, Hokkaido. His sire was Mill George, a successful sire in Japan who had produced numerous successful offspring. Mill George himself was the son of the highly successful Mill Reef, who was one of the best race horses in Europe after World War II. Inari One's dam was Teito Yashima, a daughter of Epsom Derby winner Larkspur. Inari One's name was taken from the Anamori Inari Shrine, which is located near the Ohi Racecourse where he ran most of his races as a three and four-year-old. When he was old enough to begin race training, he was taken in to the stables of trainer Fumio Fukunaga, who was a trainer at Ohi Racecourse. It was decided that Inari One would initially be focused on local-level racing on dirt courses, as most offspring of Mill George that found success had also been at that level and it was assumed that Inari One would likely follow this path.

== Career ==
=== Local racing (1986–1988) ===
Inari One made his racing debut at Ohi Racecourse on 9 December 1986, where he won by four lengths. He was scratched from a schedule appearance in a New Year's race, but saw a highly successful 1987 season. Though he was not entered in to the Haneda Hai or Tokyo Derby, the original goals for him in Spring, he won all races he participated in that year for 8 consecutive victories. This included a victory in the Tokyo Okan Sho in fall, which was his first major race victory. In December, he took victory in the Tokyowan Cup, a race that had been newly promoted to a graded stakes event.

Inari One's four-year-old season began with the Kinpai in March 1988, but with poor weather conditions, he struggled and only managed to finish third. Wet weather at his next race, the Teio Sho, resulted in an even worse showing, with Inari One only managing seventh. During the summer, some plans were made to run Inari One in the Japan Cup by way of participating in the Sankei Sho All Comers, but he was not selected to run in the All Comers, and continued to participate in races at Ohi. Inari One's next races - the Kanto Hai in August and the Tokyo Kinen in November, also resulted in loses, with fifth and third-place results respectively. In late November, he was invited to participate in the Zennippon Thoroughbred Cup at Kasamatsu Racecourse, where he finished second.

At the end of 1988, Inari One was entered in to the Tokyo Daishōten. Prior to the race, it was announced that if Inari One took victory, he would be transferred to national level racing, with a goal of running the Tenno Sho in spring. Entering the race, he was the third favorite, behind Aeroplane, who had won his last six starts. In the race, Inari One benefited from a slow pace and was able to pull ahead in the final straight to take victory by 1/2 length over second-favorite Aranas Monta. After the race, Inari One's owner reiterated plans to move to national racing, adding the Takarazuka Kinen as a second goal for the horse. In January 1989, Inari One was de-registered for Ohi Racecourse and registered for national racing. He was also transferred to the stables of Kiyoshi Suzuki at the Miho Training Center for Suzuki to be his new trainer, while Fumio Fukunaga retained an advisory role.

=== National racing (1989–1990) ===
Inari One made his debut at the national level and his first start on a turf circuit in the Subaru Stakes at Kyoto Racecourse in 1989, where he finished fourth. His next race was the Hanshin Daishōten, which was his first JRA graded race. Inari One was unable to show his full pace in this race after being cut-off by Slew O'Dyna in the final straight. Slew O'Dyna would be disqualified from the race for the move, leaving Inari One with a fifth-place finish.

In April, Inari One was entered in to the Tenno Sho for his first major Grade 1 event. Prior to the race, Yutaka Take was hired to be the jokey for Inari One due to his good reputation. Take's primary horse, Super Creek, was recovering from leg injuries in the spring of 1989, and so he was free to ride Inari One. Entering the race, Inari One was the fourth favorite in the field, while Slew O'Dyna was the favorite ahead of Running Free. In the race, he ran in the midfield for much of the distance, but charged forward out of the final turn to take the lead, ultimately extended to a five length margin at the finish to claim his first Grade 1 win and first win after transferring to the national level. It was the first time in 21 years that a horse had come from local racing to take victory in the Tenno Sho. Additionally, Inari One's winning time of 3:18.4 set a new record for fastest running of the Spring Tenno Sho.

Inari One's next race was the Takarazuka Kinen in June with Yutake Take still as his jockey. Inari One was the second favorite entering the race, behind Yaeno Muteki, who had won the Satsuki Shō in 1988. The field featured seven horses that had previous won grade 1 events, including Sakura Chiyono O, Cosmo Dream, Fresh Voice, and Bamboo Memory. In the race, Inari One ran toward the front and made a move to the lead on the final corner. He held the led for the remainder of the race, holding off a charge from Fresh Voice to win and take consecutive grade 1 victories.

After a break during the summer, Inari One returned to racing at the Mainichi Ōkan in October. Yutaka Take was no longer available to jockey, as Super Creek had healed from his leg injuries and begun racing again. As such, veteran jockey Masato Shibata was hired in his place. Despite coming off consecutive grade 1 victories, Inari One was only second favorite behind Oguri Cap. The two battled for victory in the race, ending in a photo finish in which Oguri Cap was declared the winner. At the end of October, Inari One was entered in to the autumn Tenno Sho, but appeared nervous and only finished sixth, well behind winner Super Creek. At the end of November, he was entered in to the Japan Cup, but results were even worse, as he only managed to finish 11th.

At the end of 1989, Inari One earned entry in to the Arima Kinen by fan vote. In the lead up to the race, Inari One's camp found that the likely cause of the horse's poor performances in his previous races as poor diet. After returning to the Miura Training Center for a few weeks, his diet improved again and his training performances proved better. On race day, Oguri Cap was the favorite to win, while Super Creek was second favorite. Inari One was fourth favorite. During the race, Oguri Cap and Super Creek ran in the front, while Inari One ran towards the back. Inari One began to move forward on the second lap and in the final straight challenged Super Creek for victory. Inari One would edge ahead, and was declared victor by a nose after a photo review. Inari One's winning time was 2:31.7, which broke the race record set by Symboli Rudolf by 1.1 seconds. He also became only the fourth horse to win the Takarazuka Kinen and Arima Kinen in the same year. At the end-of-year JRA awards, Inari One was voted as the Japanese Horse of the Year for 1989, receiving 140 out of a total of 172 votes. He was also voted as Best older male horse of 1989.

Inari One continued to be raced in to his six-year-old season. In March 1990, he was entered in to the Hanshin Daishōten again. He struggled however, and finished fifth in the six horse field. His next race was the spring Tenno Sho, as he attempted to win back-to-back runnings. Inari One battled against Super Creek again in this race, but was unable to catch Super Creek and finished second. In June, he was entered in to the Takarazuka Kinen for a second year in a row. Inari One was unable to mount a serious challenge for the win and ultimately finished fourth, five lengths behind winner Osaichi George. Plans were made to run Inari One in the autumn Tenno Sho, but during the summer, he suffered an injury to the fetlock of his right-front leg. With Inari One already being fairly old for racing, he was retired from racing due to the injury. A retirement ceremony was held on 23 December, the same day as the 1990 Arima Kinen.

=== Racing record ===
Inari One participated in 25 races, with 12 wins including 3 Grade 1 victories.

Date	Distance (Condition)	Race	Class	Course	Field	HN	Odds (Favored)	Finish	Time	Winning (Losing) Margin	Jockey	Winner (2nd Place)	Ref
1986 – Two-year-old season
Dec 9	Dirt 1000 m (Fast)	Two Year Old Debut		Ohi	9	6	-- (1st)	1st	1:03.2	4 lengths	Masayuki Miyaura	(Chalet Cedes)	
1987 – Three-year-old season
Jan 2	Dirt 1400 m (Fast)	Three Year Old		Ohi	8	1	Scratched				Masayuki Miyaura	Champion Star	
May 20	Dirt 1500 m (Fast)	Three Year Old		Ohi	8	6	-- (1st)	1st	1:37.2	2 lengths	Masayuki Miyaura	(Esperanto)	
Jun 14	Dirt 1600 m (Fast)	Three Year Old		Ohi	10	9	-- (1st)	1st	1:45.4	1 length	Masayuki Miyaura	(Mr. Shu)	
Jun 28	Dirt 1600 m (Fast)	Lilac Tokubetsu		Ohi	12	8	-- (1st)	1st	1:44.1	1 1/2 lengths	Masayuki Miyaura	(Lindo Machine)	
Aug 21	Dirt 1600 m (Fast)	Rindo Tokubetsu		Ohi	10	9	-- {1st)	1st	1:43.2	2 1/2 lengths	Masayuki Miyaura	(New Takara Hime)	
Sep 23	Dirt 1700 m (Fast)	Twinkle Age Cup		Ohi	8	1	-- (1st)	1st	1:50.0	1 1/2 lengths	Masayuki Miyaura	(Hanaki Ryu)	
Nov 11	Dirt 2600 m (Fast)	Tokyo Okan Sho		Ohi	10	3	-- (1st)	1st	2:52.7	1 length	Masayuki Miyaura	(Champion Star)	
Dec 28	Dirt 2000 m (Fast)	Tokyo-Wan Cup		Funabashi	11	4	-- (1st)	1st	2:10.4	head	Masayuki Miyaura	(Maruken Aquila)	
1988 – Four-year-old season
Mar 3	Dirt 2000 m (Sloppy)	Kimpai		Ohi	11	4	-- (2nd)	3rd	2:06.8	(5 lengths)	Masayuki Miyaura	Champion Star	
Apr 13	Dirt 2000 m (Sloppy)	Teio Sho		Ohi	14	2	-- (2nd)	7th	2:08.2	(5 3/4 lengths)	Masayuki Miyaura	Champion Star	
Aug 10	Dirt 1600 m (Sloppy)	Kanto Hai		Ohi	10	2	-- (4th)	5th	1:40.9	(7 1/2 lengths)	Masayuki Miyaura	Eagle Chateau	
Nov 2	Dirt 2400 m (Fast)	Tokyo Kinen		Ohi	10	6	-- (3rd)	3rd	2:36.2	(1 1/2 lengths)	Masayuki Miyaura	Dash Hosho	
Nov 23	Dirt 2500 m (Fast)	Zen-Nippon Thoroughbred Cup		Kasamatsu	10	3	-- (3rd)	2nd	2:50.1	(1 1/2 lengths)	Masayuki Miyaura	Fate Northern	
Dec 29	Dirt 3000 m (Fast)	Tokyo Daishoten		Ohi	12	2	-- (3rd)	1st	3:17.3	1/2 length	Masayuki Miyaura	(Aranas Monta)	
1989 – Five-year-old season
Feb 11	Turf 2000 m (Soft)	Subaru Stakes	OP	Kyoto	9	4	3.7 (2nd)	4th	2:02.8	(3/4 length)	Futoshi Kojima	Chunika O	
Mar 12	Turf 3000 m (Firm)	Hanshin Daishoten	GII	Hanshin	11	7	5.3 (2nd)	5th	3:07.7	(2 lengths)	Futoshi Kojima	Namura Mononofu	
Apr 29	Turf 3200 m (Firm)	Tenno Sho (Spring)	GI	Kyoto	18	1	9.3 (4th)	1st	R3:18.8	5 lengths	Yutaka Take	(Mr. Cyclennon)	
Jun 11	Turf 2200 m (Firm)	Takarazuka Kinen	GI	Hanshin	16	3	4.8 (2nd)	1st	2:14.0	neck	Yutaka Take	(Fresh Voice)	
Oct 8	Turf 1800 m (Good)	Mainichi Okan	GII	Tokyo	8	4	9.0 (3rd)	2nd	1:46.7	(nose)	Masato Shibata	Oguri Cap	
Oct 29	Turf 2000 m (Firm)	Tenno Sho (Autumn)	GI	Tokyo	14	7	6.2 (4th)	6th	1:59.8	(3 3/4 lengths)	Masato Shibata	Super Creek	
Nov 26	Turf 2400m (Firm)	Japan Cup	GI	Tokyo	15	12	14.0 (8th)	11th	2:23.8	(10 lengths)	Masato Shibata	Horlicks	
Dec 24	Turf 2500 m (Firm)	Arima Kinen	GI	Nakayama	16	15	16.7 (4th)	1st	R2:31.7	nose	Masato Shibata	(Super Creek)	
1990 – Six-year-old season
Mar 11	Turf 3000 m (Firm)	Hanshin Daishoten	GII	Hanshin	6	1	2.5 (2nd)	5th	3:11.3	(6 3/4 lengths)	Masato Shibata	Osumi Shadai	
Apr 29	Turf 3200 m (Firm)	Tenno Sho (Spring)	GI	Kyoto	16	7	6.0 (2nd)	2nd	3:22.0	(1/2 length)	Masato Shibata	Super Creek	
Jun 10	Turf 2200 m (Firm)	Takarazuka Kinen	GI	Hanshin	10	2	4.7 (2nd)	4th	2:15.1	(6 1/2 lengths)	Masato Shibata	Osaichi George	

== Retirement ==
Inari One was retired to stud at the Hidaka Light Stallion Agricultural Cooperative Monbetsu Stud Farm. He produced some offspring that were successful at local racing, but never produced a graded stakes winner. Inari One's most notable progeny included Tsukifuku O, who won the Tokyo Okan Sho in 1995, and Inari Concorde, who won the Tokyo Kinen and Kinpai in 2000.

Inari One was retired from stud in 2004 and was sent to a small horse farm in Monbetsu. In 2010, he was moved to the Old West Equestrian Club in Kitaibaraki, Ibaraki, and in 2014 he spent time as part of the Meritorious Horse Breeding Support Project in Shimukappu, Hokkaido.

Inari One died on 7 February 2016 at age 31 due to complications from old age.

== In popular culture ==
An anthropomorphized version of Inari One appears as a character in Umamusume: Pretty Derby, voiced by Haruno Inoue. She is depicted as a traditional, fearless, and temperamental village girl with a fascination for the Edo period, and has an enjoyment for the lively atmosphere of festivals and pulling lighthearted pranks. However, she is very prone to getting angry, one instance of which occurs when other characters call her name wrong. She makes an appearance as a major character in the spin-off series Umamusume: Cinderella Gray as one of Oguri Cap's biggest rivals.

== Pedigree ==
Pedigree of Inari One, bay, foaled 7 May 1984
Sire Mill George (USA) 1975	Mill Reef (USA); 1968	Never Bend (USA); 1960	Nasrullah (GBR); 1940
Sire Mill George (USA) 1975	Mill Reef (USA); 1968	Never Bend (USA); 1960	Lalun (USA); 1952
Sire Mill George (USA) 1975	Mill Reef (USA); 1968	Milan Mill (USA); 1962	Princequillo (IRE); 1940
Sire Mill George (USA) 1975	Mill Reef (USA); 1968	Milan Mill (USA); 1962	Virginia Water (USA); 1953
Sire Mill George (USA) 1975	Miss Charisma (USA); 1967	Ragusa (GBR); 1960	Ribot (GBR); 1952
Sire Mill George (USA) 1975	Miss Charisma (USA); 1967	Ragusa (GBR); 1960	Fantan (USA); 1952
Sire Mill George (USA) 1975	Miss Charisma (USA); 1967	Matatina (GBR); 1960	Grey Sovereign (GBR); 1948
Sire Mill George (USA) 1975	Miss Charisma (USA); 1967	Matatina (GBR); 1960	Zanzara (GBR); 1951
Dam Teito Yashima (JPN) 1970	Larkspur (IRE); 1959	Never Say Die (USA); 1951	Nasrullah (GBR); 1940
Dam Teito Yashima (JPN) 1970	Larkspur (IRE); 1959	Never Say Die (USA); 1951	Singing Grass (USA); 1944
Dam Teito Yashima (JPN) 1970	Larkspur (IRE); 1959	Skylarking (GBR); 1950	Precipitation (GBR); 1933
Dam Teito Yashima (JPN) 1970	Larkspur (IRE); 1959	Skylarking (GBR); 1950	Woodlark (GBR); 1944
Dam Teito Yashima (JPN) 1970	Yashima Jet (JPN); 1960	Solonaway (IRE); 1946	Solferino (GBR); 1940
Dam Teito Yashima (JPN) 1970	Yashima Jet (JPN); 1960	Solonaway (IRE); 1946	Anyway (GBR); 1935
Dam Teito Yashima (JPN) 1970	Yashima Jet (JPN); 1960	Yashima Nishiki (JPN); 1948	Theft (GBR); 1932
Dam Teito Yashima (JPN) 1970	Yashima Jet (JPN); 1960	Yashima Nishiki (JPN); 1948	Kamimasa (JPN) (Family:5-h); 1938

- Inari One was inbred 4S × 4D to Nasrullah, meaning that this stallion appears in the fourth generation of both the sire's and dam's side of his pedigree.
