= Matikanefukukitaru =

Japanese thoroughbred racehorse and sire

Matikanefukukitaru マチカネフクキタル
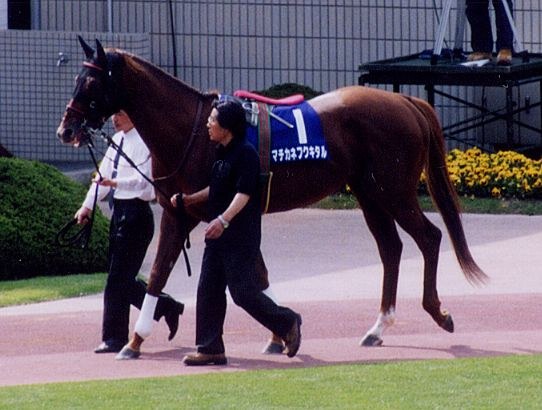
- Matikanefukukitaru at the 1999 Tenno Sho (Spring).
- Breed: Thoroughbred
- Sire: Crystal Glitters
- Grandsire: Blushing Groom
- Dam: Athena Tosho
- Damsire: Tosho Boy
- Sex: Stallion
- Foaled: May 22, 1994
- Died: July 31, 2020 (aged 26)
- Country: Japan
- Colour: Chestnut
- Breeder: Shinsei Bokujo
- Owner: Masuo Hosokawa
- Racing colours
- Trainer: Hisao Nibun
- Jockey: Katsumi Minai
- Record: 22: 6-4-1
- Earnings: ¥370,250,000

Major wins
- Kobe Shimbun Hai (1997); Kyoto Shimbun Hai (1997); Kikuka Sho (1997)

Matikanefukukitaru (Note: The horse's name in Japanese is "Machikane Fukukitaru". However, racehorse names in English must be 18 characters or fewer including punctuation. Because of this, the chi was romanized with the alternate ti, and the space was removed.) (Japanese: マチカネフクキタル, Hepburn: Machikanefukukitaru; 22 May 1994 – 31 July 2020) was a Japanese Thoroughbred racehorse and sire. In his racing career, he won 6 of 22 races, the most notable of these being the 1997 Kikuka Sho, Kobe Shimbun Hai, and Kyoto Shimbun Hai.

== Background ==
Matikanefukukitaru was a chestnut horse with a white star on his forehead bred by Shinsei Bokujo in Hokkaido. His damsire was Arima Kinen winner Tosho Boy, and he had famous mare Shiraoki in his mother's line.

Matikanefukukitaru's dam, Athena Tosho, would occasionally bite or kick her foals and was regarded by those who looked after her as being aggressive and badly tempered. When Matikanefukukitaru was with Athena Tosho, he stayed close to avoid being kicked, and when he sensed her bad mood, he would quickly take refuge in the foal's room. His breeder was reportedly impressed and said, "This foal is clever."

The name "Matikanefukukitaru" was chosen by public vote. When Hosokawa was interviewed by an economic newspaper, he said that he struggled naming the horses he owned. In response, a reporter suggested that he should leave the name to a public vote, and Hosokawa jokingly replied "I wonder if that's okay". However, later, an article was published that decided to open a vote for horse names, and 8,999 applications were collected. Hosokawa himself established a judging committee, and also participated in the process. For Matikanefukukitaru, 5 applications were submitted, and the name "Fukukitaru" was adopted. "Machikane" is derived from Osaka University where Hosokawa spent his youth.

Since Matikanefukukitaru's resting heart rate was lower than that of a typical racehorse, there was a high expectation of improved cardiorespiratory function. A low resting heart rate meant that the heart could pump more blood around the body in a single beat. While the heart rate of a normal racehorse is more than 30 beats per minute, the heart rate of Matikanefukukitaru was 28–30 beats per minute. A similar trend can be seen in two-time Japanese Horse of the Year Kitasan Black.

== Racing career ==
=== 1996: three-year-old season ===
Note: (Note: In Japan, horses were 1 year old at the time of birth until 2000. It is necessary to keep this in mind when reading horse racing materials before 2000, as a horse that is "three years old" is really only 2 years old.)

Matikanefukukitaru's debut race was a dirt race over 1200 metres at Hanshin Racecourse on 30 November 1996. He started the race as the second favourite and came third behind Erimo Shiten O by a nose and winner Kyoei March by over ten lengths. In his next race on 21 December, again at Hanshin Racecourse, he came fourth behind Last Call.

=== 1997: four-year-old season ===
Matikanefukukitaru's first race in his 1997 season was a maiden race for four-year-olds, again at Hanshin Racecourse. He was the first favourite on the dirt track over 1800 metres, and came first, beating the second place horse Tenzan Glamour by five lengths. After this victory, he ran again at Hanshin in the allowance race Kunshinran Sho and came second behind Premium Thunder. His next race was another allowance race, the Moonee Valley Racing Club Sho at Kyoto Racecourse, for horses who had won less than 5 million yen in their racing careers. Matikanefukukitaru came first in this race, beating T.M. Tokkyu by two and a half lengths.

After these victories, Matikanefukukitaru's owners set their sights on the Japanese Derby, and thus had him run in the Principal Stakes, a trial race for the Derby. On 10 May 1997, Matikanefukukitaru came second behind Silence Suzuka and this allowed him to run in that year's Japanese Derby.

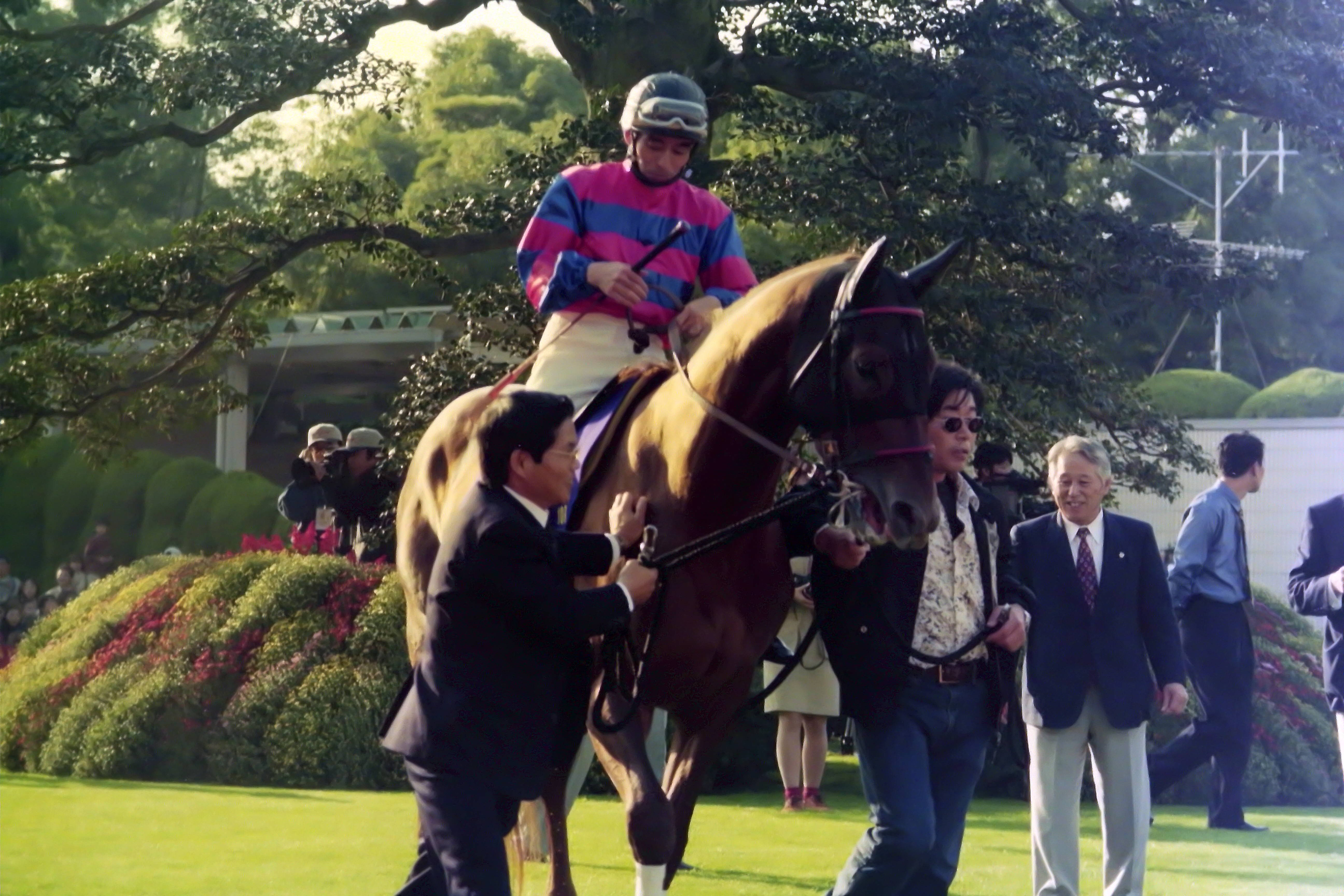
Matikanefukukitaru in November 1997 with Hisao Nibun (second on the left)

On the day of the Derby, 1 June 1997, Matikanefukukitaru, as the eleventh favourite, finished the race at seventh place, coming behind Air Guts by a neck. Matikanefukukitaru's trainer, Hisao Nibun, expressed disappointment in the horse's performance at the Derby due to Crystal Glitters's offspring being known for their speed. Hisao Nibun said, "I thought it was a child of Crystal Glitters. The legs are fast for a moment, but they stop." He also expressed that learning "how to use the legs" will be essential.

Matikanefukukitaru's next race would be the Sakurambo Stakes at Tokyo Racecourse on 5 July. This was his first race with renowned jockey Yutaka Take and started as the 1.4/1 favourite against 10 other horses. He won this race by 3 lengths and would run in the Grade 2 Kobe Shimbun Hai, a trial race for the Kikuka Sho. Because of Yutaka Take riding Sakura Laurel in Europe at the time of this race, Matikanefukukitaru was ridden by Katsumi Minami. The race began with Matikanefukukitaru as the second favourite behind Silence Suzuka. While Silence Suzuka ran away from the rest of the horses, Matikanefukukitaru stayed in the last position even until the last corner. On the final straight, Matikanefukukitaru managed the close the distance of over ten lengths and defeated Silence Suzuka by 1 and a quarter lengths. This was jockey Katsumi Minami's first major victory and this race also allowed Matikanefukukitaru to run in the Kikuka Sho. Minami recalled, "I never thought I would catch Silence Suzuka ... there was a plan to go to the medium-distance route such as the Tenno Sho (autumn), but the camp that saw this run decided to run for the Kikuka Sho."

Matikanefukukitaru would go on to run in the Kyoto Shimbun Hai, another trial race for the Kikuka Sho. Despite weighing an extra ten kilograms in this race, bringing his total weight up to 510 kg, Matikanefukukitaru was able to defeat previous favourite of the Satsuki Sho and Japanese Derby Mejiro Bright..

On the day of the Kikuka Sho, having won two consecutive races, Matikanefukukitaru was originally meant to be the first favourite in the race. However, his father Crystal Glitters was considered a horse best suited for short and medium-distance races. Additionally, Matikanefukukitaru's damsire Tosho Boy previously came third in the Kikuka Sho. These factors contributed to the belief that Matikanefukukitaru, like his father, was not suited for a long-distance race like the Kikuka Sho. The first favourite on the day of the race was Silk Justice, who had previously won the Grade 2 Kyoto Daishoten. The second favourite was Mejiro Bright, who Matikanefukukitaru had previously defeated in the Kyoto Shimbun Hai.

At the start of the race, the 14th favourite T.M. Top Dan ran away, and Matikanefukukitaru was in third place. His time for passing the 1000 metre mark was 61.8 seconds, and the time for passing the 2000 metre mark was 2 minutes and 8 seconds. This was considered a slow time, however Matikanefukukitaru was able to move between fourth and fifth place. Near the third corner, Mejiro Bright moved to the outside and positioned himself in the middle of the pack, while Silk Justice was waiting for the right time to begin his spurt from the rear. T.M. Top Dan held his lead to the final straight, and Matikanefukukitaru stayed behind Mejiro Bright. At one point, Mejiro Bright took the lead, however Matikanefukukitaru managed to split through the other horses and won the race by one length. With this victory, Masuo Hosokawa won a Grade 1 race and a Classic race for the first time in his 31 years as a horse owner.

=== 1998-2000: five to seven-year-old seasons ===
Matikanefukukitaru's five-year-old season was plagued by hoof diseases such as a cracked hoof and arthiritis of the bulb joint. Because of his ailments, he could not race smoothly and had a poor result in this season with no races won.

At six years old, his best results were reaching second place in the Grade 2 Kyoto Kinen and Osaka Hai. At seven, he finished tenth in the Kinko Sho and eighth in the Takarazuka Kinen, but retired after developing flexor tendinitis during a training session.

== Stud career ==
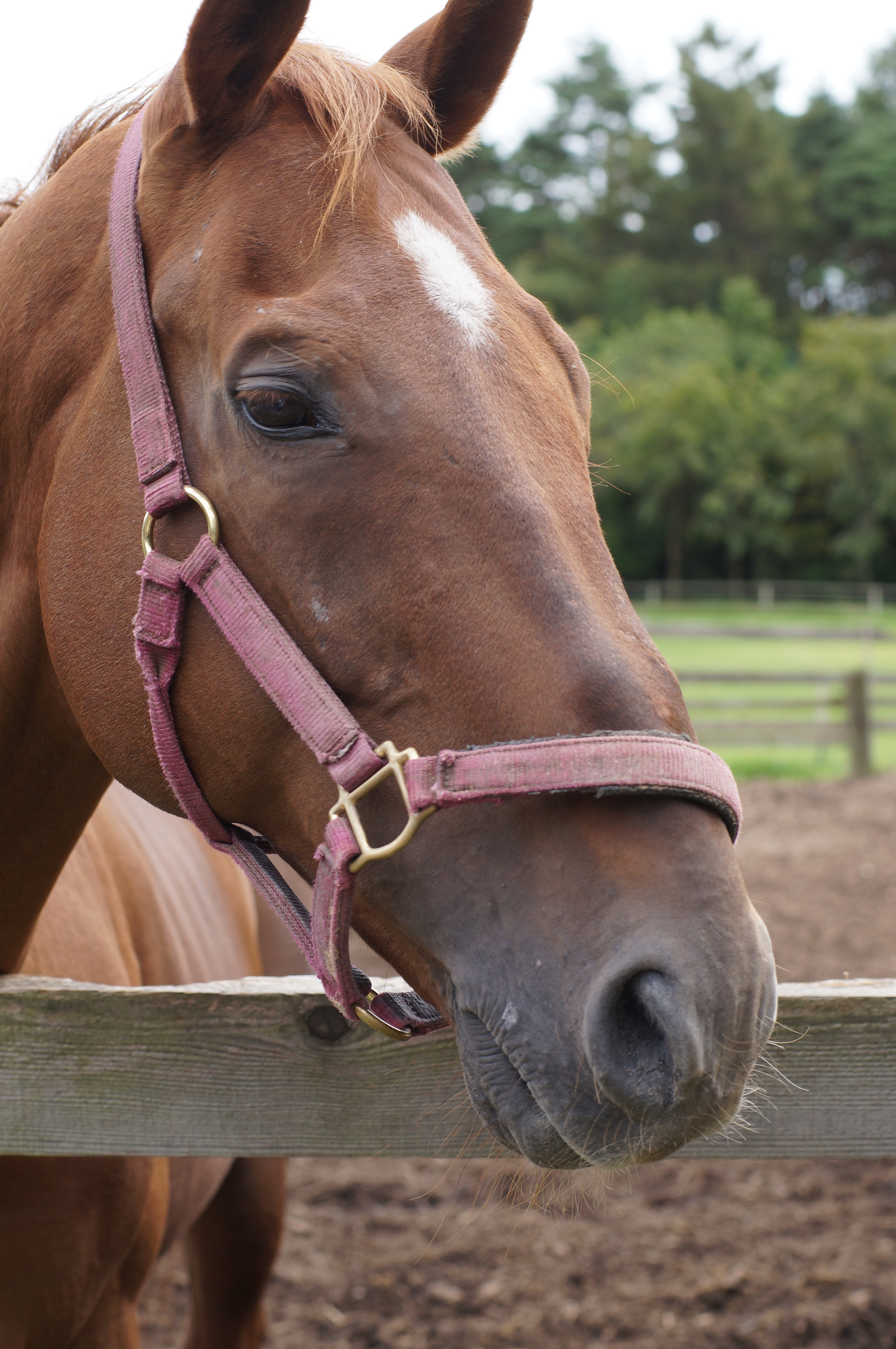
Matikanefukukitaru at Kosuda Ranch in 2012

At the end of his racing career, Matikanefukukitaru was retired to become a breeding stallion at Kosuda Ranch in Hokuto City, Yamanashi Prefecture. Around 100 to 200 fans visited him at the ranch each year. He also appeared at an event at Kōfu Station and a photoshoot at WINS Isawa, a JRA off-track betting site in Isawa, Yamanashi.

At Kosuda Ranch, he showed a calm temperament, allowing visitors to pet his head and eating carrots offered to him. The farm's owner recalled, "He was a smart and gentle horse who was devoted to fan service."

Matikanefukukitaru died at Kosuda Ranch on 31 July 2020.

=== Notable progeny ===
- Reward Present, ¥80 million earnings, Nakayama Grand Jump 2007 runner up

== In popular culture ==
An anthropomorphized version of Matikanefukukitaru appears as a character in the Japanese multimedia franchise Umamusume: Pretty Derby, voiced by Hiyori Nitta. She is depicted as being very superstitious and hyperactive, and relies on fortune-telling and various good luck charms to bring success to herself as well as others by providing divination services. Fukukitaru also suffers from low self-esteem and regularly attributes her victories to divine influence or luck. Her tendencies to make loud noises with her roommate, Matikanetannhauser, oftentimes anger her neighbors, especially Air Shakur. Shiraoki, a fourth-generation ancestor of Matikanefukukitaru, is referenced in the franchise as a Shinto kami that she is especially devoted to.

== Racing record ==
Matikanefukukitaru participated in 22 races over his career, winning 6.

Date	Age	Race	Grade	Distance (condition)	Track	Finish	Field	Time	Jockey	1st Place (2nd Place)
30 Nov 1996	3	Two Year Old Newcomers		1200m (Fast)	Hanshin	3	13	1:15.1	Shinji Fujita	Kyoei March
21 Dec 1996	3	Two Year Old Maiden		1600m (Firm)	Hanshin	4	16	1:37.3	Shinji Fujita	Osumi Giant
15 Mar 1997	4	Three Year Old Maiden		1800m (Muddy)	Hanshin	1	8	1:53.3	Hiroyuki Uemura	(Tenzan Glamour)
6 Apr 1997	4	Kunshiran Sho	OP	1600m (Heavy)	Hanshin	2	16	1:38.0	Hiroyuki Uemura	Premium Thunder
19 Apr 1997	4	Moonee Valley Racing Club Sho	OP	1800m (Firm)	Kyoto	1	14	1:46.4	Hiroyuki Uemura	(T. M. Tokkyu)
10 May 1997	4	Principal Stakes	OP	2200m (Firm)	Tokyo	2	16	2:13.4	Yoshitomi Shibata	Silence Suzuka
1 Jun 1997	4	Tōkyō Yūshun	G1	2400m (Firm)	Tokyo	7	17	2:26.4	Yoshitomi Shibata	Sunny Brian
5 Jul 1997	4	Sakurambo Stakes	OP	1700m (Firm)	Fukushima	1	11	1:41.8	Yutaka Take	(Shako Tesco)
14 Sep 1997	4	Kobe Shimbun Hai	G2	2000m (Firm)	Hanshin	1	11	2:00.0	Katsumi Minai	(Silence Suzuka)
12 Oct 1997	4	Kyoto Shimbun Hai	G2	2200m (Firm)	Kyoto	1	12	2:13.1	Katsumi Minai	(Pulsebeat)
2 Nov 1997	4	Kikuka-shō	G1	3000m (Firm)	Kyoto	1	18	3:07.7	Katsumi Minai	(Daiwa Oshu)
30 May 1998	5	Kinko Sho	G2	2000m (Firm)	Chukyo	6	9	2:00.5	Katsumi Minai	Silence Suzuka
21 Jun 1998	5	Naruo Kinen	G2	2000m (Heavy)	Hanshin	8	14	2:05.1	Katsumi Minai	Sunrise Flag
27 Dec 1998	5	Arima Kinen	G1	2500m (Firm)	Nakayama	13	16	2:34.3	Yukio Okabe	Grass Wonder
14 Feb 1999	6	Kyoto Kinen	G2	2200m (Firm)	Kyoto	2	10	2:15.6	Yutaka Take	Emocion
7 Mar 1999	6	Yomiuri Milers Cup	G2	1600m (Good)	Hanshin	11	14	1:38.1	Koshiro Take	Egao o Misete
4 Apr 1999	6	Sankei Osaka Hai	G2	2000m (Firm)	Hanshin	2	11	2:00.0	Tetsuzo Sato	Silent Hunter
2 May 1999	6	Tenno Sho (Spring)	G1	3200m (Firm)	Kyoto	7	12	3:16.8	Tetsuzo Sato	Special Week
11 Jul 1999	6	Takarazuka Kinen	G1	2200m (Firm)	Hanshin	5	12	2:14.0	Tetsuzo Sato	Grass Wonder
22 Aug 1999	6	Sapporo Kinen	G2	2000m (Firm)	Sapporo	7	10	2:01.4	Tetsuzo Sato	Seiun Sky
27 May 2000	7	Kinko Sho	G2	2000m (Good)	Chukyo	10	11	2:00.5	Hirofumi Shii	Meisho Doto
25 Jun 2000	7	Takarazuka Kinen	G1	2200m (Firm)	Hanshin	8	11	2:15.6	Hideaki Miyuki	T. M. Opera O

== Pedigree ==
Pedigree of Matikanefukukitaru (JPN), chestnut stallion, 1994
Sire Crystal Glitters (USA) 1980	Blushing Groom (FRA); 1974	Red God	Nasrullah
Sire Crystal Glitters (USA) 1980	Blushing Groom (FRA); 1974	Red God	Spring Run
Sire Crystal Glitters (USA) 1980	Blushing Groom (FRA); 1974	Runaway Bride	Wild Risk
Sire Crystal Glitters (USA) 1980	Blushing Groom (FRA); 1974	Runaway Bride	Aimee
Sire Crystal Glitters (USA) 1980	Tales to Tell (USA); 1967	Donut King	Determine
Sire Crystal Glitters (USA) 1980	Tales to Tell (USA); 1967	Donut King	Strayed
Sire Crystal Glitters (USA) 1980	Tales to Tell (USA); 1967	Fleeting Doll	Fleet Nasrullah
Sire Crystal Glitters (USA) 1980	Tales to Tell (USA); 1967	Fleeting Doll	Chinese Doll
Dam Athena Tosho (JPN) 1981	Tosho Boy (JPN); 1973	Tesco Boy	Princely Gift
Dam Athena Tosho (JPN) 1981	Tosho Boy (JPN); 1973	Tesco Boy	Suncourt
Dam Athena Tosho (JPN) 1981	Tosho Boy (JPN); 1973	Social Butterfly	Your Host
Dam Athena Tosho (JPN) 1981	Tosho Boy (JPN); 1973	Social Butterfly	Wisteria
Dam Athena Tosho (JPN) 1981	Grey Tosho (JPN); 1974	Silver Shark	Buisson Ardent
Dam Athena Tosho (JPN) 1981	Grey Tosho (JPN); 1974	Silver Shark	Palsaka
Dam Athena Tosho (JPN) 1981	Grey Tosho (JPN); 1974	Rose Tosho	Tudor Period
Dam Athena Tosho (JPN) 1981	Grey Tosho (JPN); 1974	Rose Tosho	Waka Shiraoki (Family:3-l)
