= Super Creek =

Japanese-bred Thoroughbred racehorse

Super Creek スーパークリーク
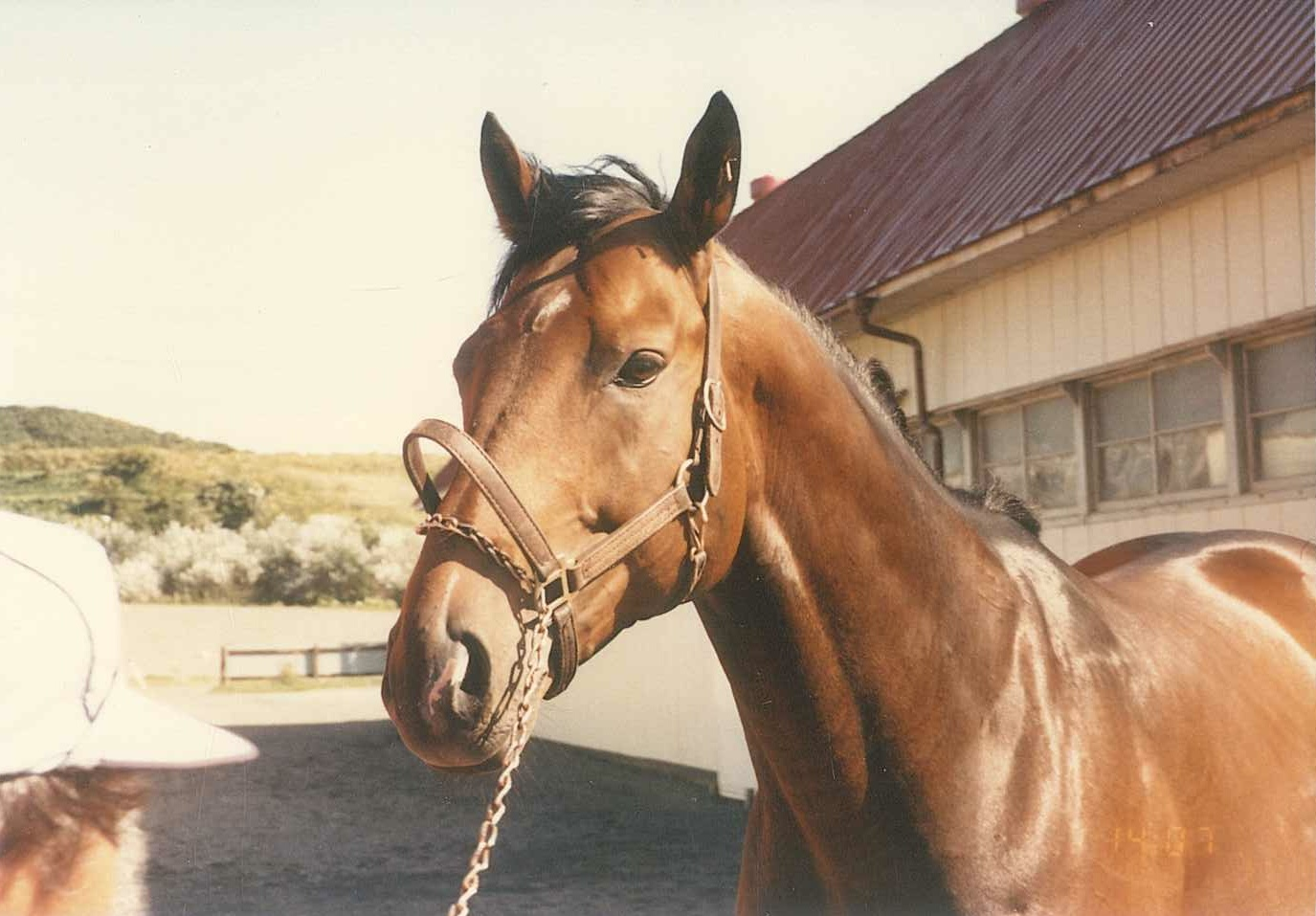
- Super Creek in 1996.
- Breed: Thoroughbred
- Sire: No Attention (FR)
- Grandsire: Green Dancer (USA)
- Dam: Nice Day (JPN)
- Damsire: Intermezzo (GB)
- Sex: Stallion
- Foaled: May 27, 1985
- Died: August 29, 2010 (aged 25)
- Country: Japan
- Colour: Bay
- Breeder: Kashiwadai Farm
- Owner: Makoto Kikura
- Racing colours
- Trainer: Shuji Ito
- Jockey: Yutaka Take; Seiki Tabara
- Record: 16: 8-2-2
- Earnings: 562,535,200 JPY (JRA)

Major wins
- Kyōto Daishōten (1989, 1990); Tennō Shō (Autumn) (1989); Sankei Osaka Hai (1990); Tennō Shō (Spring) (1990); Japanese Classic Race wins: Kikuka Sho (1988)

Super Creek (Japanese: スーパークリーク, Hepburn: Sūpā Kurīku; 27 May 1985 – 29 August 2010) was a Japanese Thoroughbred racehorse and stallion who won multiple major Japanese racing events, including the 1988 Kikuka-shō and the 1989 Autumn and 1990 Spring Tennō Shōs. Alongside Oguri Cap and Inari One, Super Creek was known as a member of the "Heisei Big Three" that helped renew interest in horse racing in Japan.

== Career ==
=== Youth ===
Super Creek was born at Kashiwadai Farm in Monbetsu, Hokkaido. Trainer Shuji Ito noticed his potential despite an outward facing front left leg.

=== Three year old season ===
Super Creek's racing debut was originally scheduled in the summer of 1987 at Hakodate Racecourse, but was delayed after the horse began suffering severe diarrhea. Super Creek instead made his debut in December at the Hanshin Racecourse in Takarazuka, Hyogo. Super Creek's first victory came in his second race, where jockey Shigeki Tahara commented, "This horse could be a real star."

Super Creek's 3-year-old season began with three races run early in the year, including a third place at the Kisaragi Sho and a victory in the Sumire Sho. Super Creek's owners then aimed to run the Tōkyō Yūshun with him, but during a training run for the Aoba Sho — a lead-up race to the Tōkyō Yūshun, Super Creek suffered a fractured front-left leg, which forced the horse out of competition for several months. Super Creek returned to racing in late September. Despite not having a graded-stakes victory yet, Super Creek earned entry in to the Kikuka-shō after the withdraw of other horses and being first in the line of reserve entries based on earned prize money. In the race, Super Creek charged out of the final corner to take the lead and victory by five lengths over Gakuen to Beat. The victory was the first G1 victory for both Super Creek and his jockey, Yutaka Take. At the end of 1988, Super Creek earned entry in to the Arima Kinen based on his popularity and was the third favorite behind Oguri Cap and Tamamo Cross. However, Super Creek was disqualified from the race after having been deemed to have obstructed the path of Mejiro Durren while trying to break out of the pack.

=== Four year old season ===
Injury once again plagued Super Creek in 1989 entering his 4-year-old season. The horse began to suffer persistent muscle pain in his hind legs and was unable to compete for most of the year. He finally returned to racing in October at the Kyōto Daishōten, where he took victory in his first race back. Super Creek then won its next outing at the Autumn Tenno Sho. The Tenno Sho victory was the first of a current record-equaling seven for jockey Yutaka Take as of 2025. Super Creek participated in the Japan Cup and Arima Kinen to finish out the year, finishing fourth and second in them, respectively.

=== Five Year old season ===
1990 was Super Creek's 5-year-old season. In early April, Super Creek took victory in the Sankai Ōsaka Hai. In late April, he took victory in the Spring Tenno Sho, making Super Creek the second horse in history to achieve victories in both Tenno Shos, after Tamamo Cross earned both in the same year in 1988. After the Tenno Sho, muscle pain again appeared in Super Creek's legs, cancelling plans to run him in the Takarazuka Kinen and a possible entry in to the Prix de l'Arc de Triomphe in France. Like in 1989, Super Creek returned to racing at the Kyōto Daishōten, where he once again took victory. Almost immediately after the race, it was discovered that Super Creek had developed laminitis in his left-front leg. Plans to run Super Creek in the autumn Tenno Sho were cancelled and, at the end of the year, Super Creek was retired from racing entirely. Retirement ceremonies were held in January 1991 at both Nakayama Racecourse and at Kyoto Racecourse.

== Racing statistics ==
Super Creek ran in 16 races, with 8 wins including 3 Grade 1 victories.

Date	Distance (Condition)	Race	Class	Course	Field	Odds (Favourite)	Finish	Time	Winning (Losing) Margin	Jockey	Winner (2nd place)	Ref
1987 – Two-year-old season
Dec 5	Turf 2000 m (Firm)	Two Year Old Debut		Hanshin	10	5.3 (4th)	2nd	2:03.1	(1/2 length)	Seiki Tabara	Foundry Dictor	
Dec 26	Turf 2000 m (Firm)	Two Year Old		Hanshin	16	2.0 (1st)	1st	2:03.1	3/4 length	Seiki Tabara	(Long Gracias)	
1988 – Three-year-old season
Jan 5	Turf 2000 m (Good)	Fukujuso Tokubetsu		Kyoto	10	2.9 (1st)	4th	2:06.5	(3 lengths)	Seiki Tabara	Meiner Frische	
Feb 14	Turf 2000 m (Firm)	Kisaragi Sho	GIII	Kyoto	8	10.2 (4th)	3rd	2:04.5	(1 3/4 lengths)	Katsumi Minai	Meiner Frische	
Mar 19	Turf 2200 m (Good)	Sumire Sho	OP	Hanshin	9	3.5 (3rd)	1st	2:18.8	1/2 length	Yutaka Take	(Power Winner)	
Sep 25	Turf 2000 m (Soft)	Kobe Shimbun Hai	GII	Hanshin	10	8.3 (4th)	3rd	2:05.5	(2 1/2 lengths)	Yutaka Take	Yaeno Dia	
Oct 16	Turf 2200m (Firm)	Kyoto Shimbun Hai	GII	Kyoto	16	13.0 (4th)	6th	2:15.6	(7 1/4 lengths)	Yutaka Take	Yaeno Muteki	
Nov 6	Turf 3000 m (Firm)	Kikuka Sho	GI	Kyoto	18	8.5 (3rd)	1st	3:07.3	5 lengths	Yutaka Take	(Gakuen to Beat)	
Dec 25	Turf 2500 m (Firm)	Arima Kinen	GI	Nakayama	13	7.4 (4th)	DQ (Note: Super Creek finished third, however, he was disqualified after the race for obstructed the path of Mejiro Durren while trying to break out of the pack.)	2:34.1	--	Yutaka Take	Oguri Cap	
1989 – Four-year-old season
Oct 8	Turf 2400 m (Firm)	Kyoto Daishoten	GII	Kyoto	10	1.4 (1st)	1st	R2:25.0	3/4 length	Yutaka Take	(Mr.Cyclennon)	
Oct 29	Turf 2000 m (Firm)	Tenno Sho (Autumn)	GI	Tokyo	14	4.5 (2nd)	1st	1:59.1	neck	Yutaka Take	(Oguri Cap)	
Nov 26	Turf 2400 m (Firm)	Japan Cup	GI	Tokyo	15	4.6 (1st)	4th	2:22.7	(3 1/2 lengths)	Yutaka Take	Horlicks	
Dec 24	Turf 2500 m (Firm)	Arima Kinen	GI	Nakayama	16	3.1 (2nd)	2nd	2:31.7	(nose)	Yutaka Take	Inari One	
1990 – Five-year-old season
Apr 1	Turf 2000 m (Good)	Sankei Osaka Hai	GII	Hanshin	9	2.2 (1st)	1st	2:02.9	3/4 length	Yutaka Take	(Osaichi George)	
Apr 29	Turf 3200 m (Firm)	Tenno Sho (Spring)	GI	Kyoto	16	1.5 (1st)	1st	3:21.9	1/2 length	Yutaka Take	(Inari One)	
Oct 7	Turf 2400 m (Soft)	Kyoto Daishoten	GII	Kyoto	6	1.1 (1st)	1st	2:26.9	1/2 length	Yutaka Take	(Real Birthday)	

== Retirement ==
Super Creek was retired to stud at Hidaka Stallion Station in Hidaka, Hokkaido in 1991. However, Super Creek's offspring were largely unsuccessful and included no graded stakes winners. Super Creek is the damsire of one G3 winner – Blue Shotgun, who won the 2006 Hankyu Hai – through his daughter Ogi Blue Venus. Super Creek produced his last foal in 2006 before being retired from stud.

Super Creek lived the remainder of his life at Hidaka Stallion Station. His health began to decline in June of 2010 as he began to suffer from poor appetite and diarrhea brought on by enteritis. His condition deteriorated rapidly a few months later, and Super Creek died on 29 August 2010 at age 25.

== In popular culture ==
An anthropomorphized version of Super Creek appears as a character in the Japanese multimedia franchise Umamusume: Pretty Derby, voiced by Kana Yūki. She is characterized as having an extremely doting, motherly personality as a result of working at her family's daycare center, allegedly inspired by the relationship she had with her real-life counterpart's jockey Yutaka Take, who won his first G1 race with Super Creek. A running gag in the franchise centers around this aspect and her tendency to coddle others, most notably smaller characters such as Tamamo Cross, Inari One, and her roommate Narita Taishin, but Creek's own tendency to place others' needs ahead of hers results in her neglecting her own well-being. She makes an appearance as a major character in the spin-off series Umamusume: Cinderella Gray.

== Pedigree ==
Pedigree of Super Creek (JPN), bay colt, May 27, 1985
Sire No Attention (FR) (1978)	Green Dancer (USA) (1972)	Nijinsky (CAN)	Northern Dancer
Sire No Attention (FR) (1978)	Green Dancer (USA) (1972)	Nijinsky (CAN)	Flaming Page
Sire No Attention (FR) (1978)	Green Dancer (USA) (1972)	Green Valley (FR)	Val de Loir
Sire No Attention (FR) (1978)	Green Dancer (USA) (1972)	Green Valley (FR)	Sly Pola (USA)
Sire No Attention (FR) (1978)	No No Nannette (1973)	Sovereign Path (GB)	Grey Sovereign
Sire No Attention (FR) (1978)	No No Nannette (1973)	Sovereign Path (GB)	Mountain Path
Sire No Attention (FR) (1978)	No No Nannette (1973)	Nuclea (GER)	Orsini
Sire No Attention (FR) (1978)	No No Nannette (1973)	Nuclea (GER)	Nixe
Dam Nice Day (JPN) (1979)	Intermezzo (GB) (1966)	Hornbeam	Hyperion
Dam Nice Day (JPN) (1979)	Intermezzo (GB) (1966)	Hornbeam	Thicket
Dam Nice Day (JPN) (1979)	Intermezzo (GB) (1966)	Plaza	Persian Gulf
Dam Nice Day (JPN) (1979)	Intermezzo (GB) (1966)	Plaza	Wild Success (IRE)
Dam Nice Day (JPN) (1979)	Sachino Hime (1957)	Sayajirao (GB)	Nearco (ITY)
Dam Nice Day (JPN) (1979)	Sachino Hime (1957)	Sayajirao (GB)	Rosy Legend (FR)
Dam Nice Day (JPN) (1979)	Sachino Hime (1957)	Sainte Maxime (GB)	Rockefella
Dam Nice Day (JPN) (1979)	Sachino Hime (1957)	Sainte Maxime (GB)	Sou'wester (Family 1-l)
