= Seiun Sky =

Japanese thoroughbred racehorse (1995–2011)

Seiun Sky セイウンスカイ
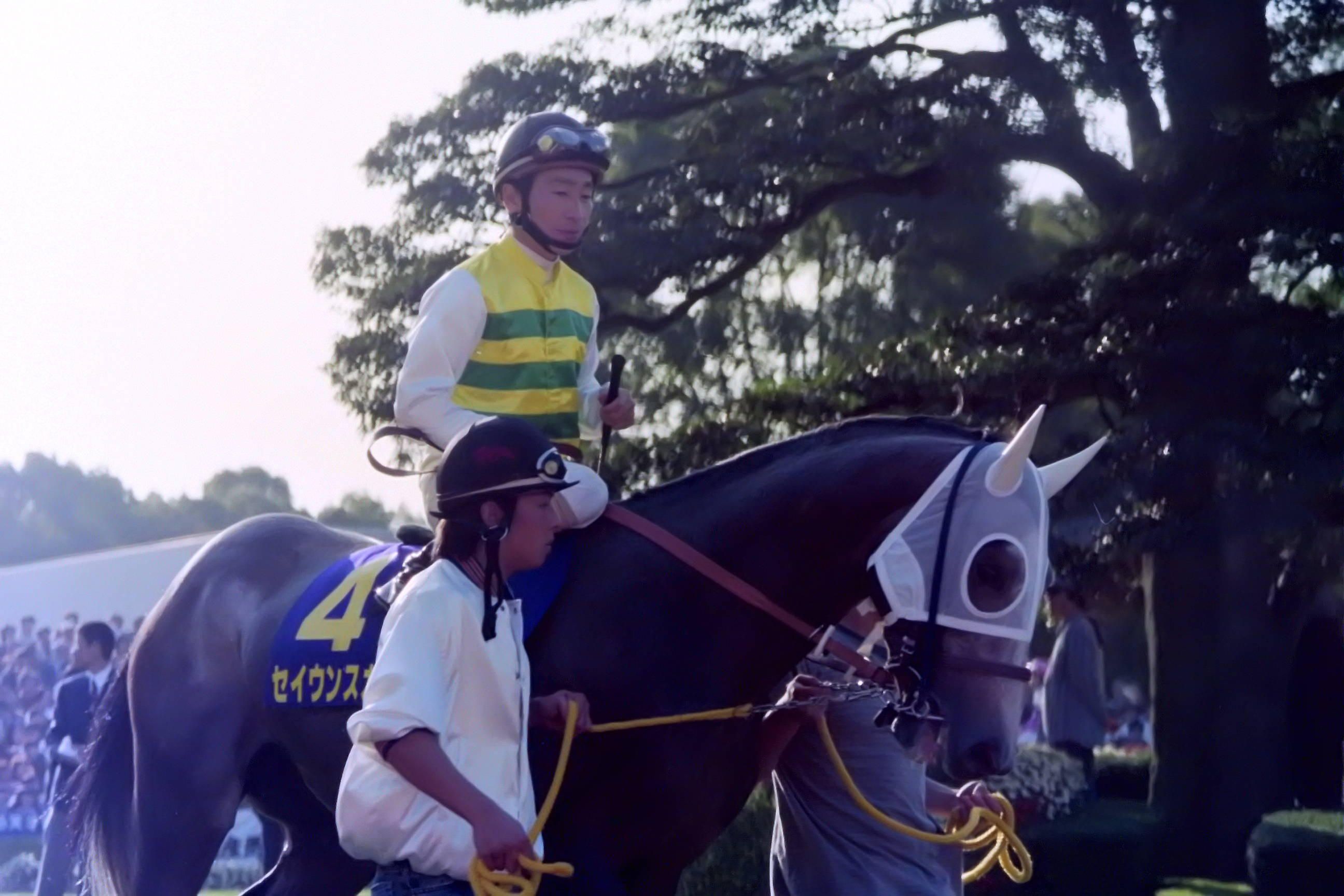
- Seiun Sky at the 1998 Kikuka Shō.
- Breed: Thoroughbred
- Sire: Sheriff's Star (GB)
- Grandsire: Posse (USA)
- Dam: Sister Mill (JPN)
- Damsire: Mill George (USA)
- Sex: Stallion
- Foaled: April 26, 1995
- Died: August 16, 2011 (aged 16)
- Country: Japan
- Colour: Gray
- Breeder: Nishiyama Stud
- Owner: Nishiyama Stud
- Racing colours
- Trainer: Kazutaka Yasuda
- Jockey: Norihiro Yokoyama
- Record: 13: 7-1-1-4
- Earnings: ¥610,282,000

Major wins
- Kyoto Daishoten (1998); Nikkei Sho (1999); Sapporo Kinen (1999); Japanese Classic Race wins: Satsuki Shō (1998); Kikuka Shō (1998)

Seiun Sky (Japanese: セイウンスカイ, Hepburn: Seiun Sukai; April 26, 1995 – August 16, 2011) was a Japanese Thoroughbred racehorse and sire. His major wins include the Satsuki Shō and Kikuka Shō of 1998, two of the Triple Crown in Japan.

== Background ==
Seiun Sky was foaled on April 26, 1995, at Nishiyama Ranch in Mukawa, Hokkaido. At the time of his birth, Nishiyama Ranch—under the leadership of its founder, Masayuki Nishiyama—operated a mass-production, mass-consumption system centered on up to 250 broodmares and the offspring of both in-house stallions and those with low breeding fees. However, the ranch had fallen on hard times due to the resulting ballooning management costs, stagnation in the renewal of broodmare bloodlines, and the failure of imported stallions.

The following year, in 1996, Masayuki Nishiyama’s son, Shigeyuki Nishiyama, took the reins of the farm’s management after his father was diagnosed with Parkinson’s disease. This marked the beginning of Nishiyama Farm’s transition from its previous mass-production and mass-consumption model to a “small but elite” approach. The farm underwent significant reforms, reducing the number of broodmares from 250 to 50 and selling nearly all of its in-house stallions to outside buyers. Seiun Sky’s sire, Sheriff’s Star, was also retired as part of this restructuring, and his remaining offspring were sold off one after another at exceptionally high prices. (Note: At that time, the offspring of Sheriff's Star were offered for 600,000 yen for colts and 400,000 yen for fillies, and it is said that all of them were sold within a single day.) As a result, among the three offspring retained at the request of a trainer were Seiun Sky and Seiun Area, who would later finish second in the Nikkei Sho.

He did not show anything particularly remarkable during his training phase, and a certain trainer in Ritto—with whom initial discussions had been underway regarding his placement—did not come to pick up Seiun Sky. Later, Kazutaka Yasuda, who had just obtained his trainer’s license, visited Nishiyama Farm—with which his family had had a long-standing relationship dating back to his father’s generation—in search of horses to bring into his stable, as he was opening his own stable just as his father, Takayoshi Yasuda, was retiring due to reaching the mandatory retirement age. However, there were only four 2-year-olds left without a stable—including Seiun Sky. At the time, Seiun Sky had poor physical balance and a dull coat, so he did not look particularly impressive. Nevertheless, Yasuda decided to take him on because he absolutely needed a colt to balance the stable’s roster, and he hoped the horse would improve given the quality of the maternal line originating from Symboli Farm. (Note: Furthermore, according to another interview with Shigeyuki Nishiyama, he stated that he kept Seiun Sky because, just before selling off the offspring of Sheriff’s Star, Takayoshi Yasuda told him, “My son is going to become a trainer, so please keep this one for him,” and he kept it accordingly.)

As Seiun Sky matured, his physique became remarkably well-balanced by the fall of his three-year-old season, surprising Yasuda; however, he also began to display a fiery temperament.

On October 1, 1997, he entered the Yasuda stable at Miho Training Center. With each training session, he demonstrated his potential, leading Yoshihiro Aoyagi—an assistant trainer who had previously trained the two-time Classic winner Miho Shinzan—to conclude, “This horse is going to run.” Although there were plans to enter him in a maiden race in December, to ensure he was in peak condition, his debut was postponed until the following year.

== Racing career ==
=== 1998: three-year old season ===
Seiun Sky ran his first race on January 5 at a debut race for four year olds held at Nakayama Racecourse over a distance of 1600 meters, with Koji Tokuyoshi as his jockey. He was the fifth most favored to win but comfortably scored a victory with a 6 length lead. He also then won the Junior Cup, where he held on to the lead for the entire race, finishing the race with a 5 length lead against the 2nd place.

He was then entered into the Yayoi Sho, which was the first graded race for the horse. He was the third most favored to win behind King Halo and Special Week, who would be considered two of the "big three" of their generation alongside Seiun Sky. Seiun Sky became the front runner in that race and kept the lead for most of the way, but was caught up by Special Week at the final slope, ultimately finishing in second place. Following the horse's defeat, the horse's main jockey was switched from Tokuyoshi to Norihiro Yokoyama.

Seiun Sky was then entered into the Satsuki Sho, where he kept his second place position among the pack until the fourth corner, where he overtook the frontrunner and took the lead, holding on to it until the finishing line, winning the Satsuki Sho by a half-length lead over King Halo.

After the Satsuki Sho, the horse was entered into the Tokyo Yushun (Japanese Derby). In that race, Seiun Sky followed King Halo, who was the front-runner in that race. However, he only managed to finish in 4th place behind Special Week. After this race, Seiun Sky took a summer break.

After the summer break, with the Kikuka Sho in mind, the horse started the autumn off with the Kyoto Daishoten, rather than the Kyoto Shimbun Hai which was a step race for that race. As the Kyoto Daishoten was a graded race that allowed older horses to participate in the race, Seiun Sky was only 4th most favored to win, with the horse facing off older horses such as Mejiro Bright, Stay Gold, and Silk Justice. In that race, Seiun Sky took the lead and became the front-runner, with the horse having a 20-length lead at one point. The rest of the pack closed in on the horse, however, as the horse had slowed down midway, and was caught up around the final 600m point, but held on to the lead before once again widening the gap on the final stretch, holding on to the lead to the end.

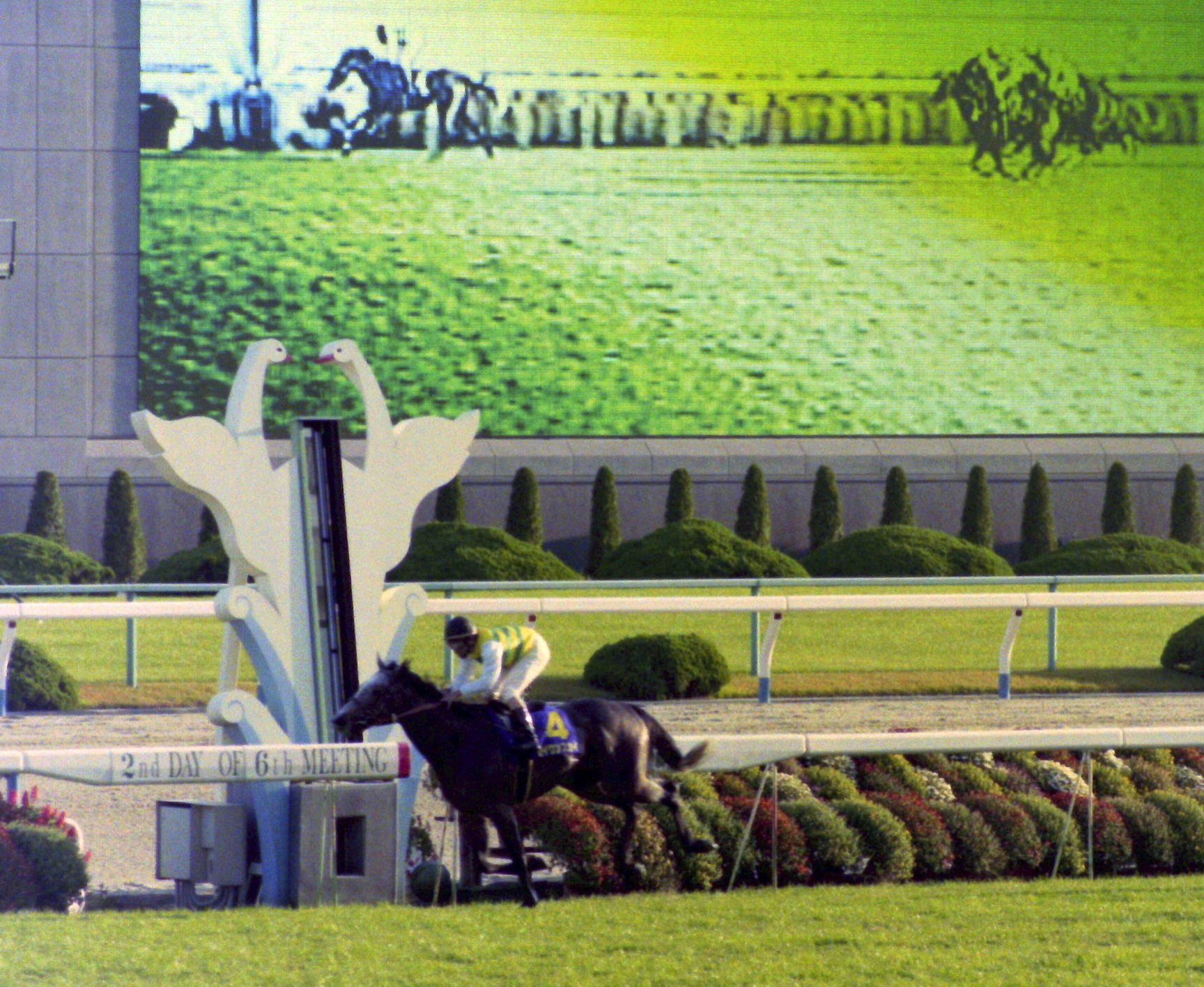
Seiun Sky finishing the 1998 Kikuka Sho.

Following the victory, the horse was entered in to the Kikuka Sho, where he was the 2nd most favored to win behind Special Week. Seiun Sky took the lead at the start, and while the horse did not run with as large of a lead as he did in the Kyoto Daishoten, he still held a 7 to 8 length lead, before slowing down briefly midway through. The horse then sped up in the latter part of the race and held on to the lead to the end, beating Special Week by 3-and-a-half length gap and becoming the first Kikuka Sho race since Haku Kuruma won in 1959 where the frontrunner won the race.

After clinching two of the Triple Crowns, the horse was entered in to the Arima Kinen to finish the season off, where he finished fourth behind Grass Wonder in spite of being the most favored to win.

=== 1999: four-year old season ===
Seiun Sky started his 4 year old season off with the Nikkei Sho, where he won the race. After the win, he was entered in to the Tenno Sho (Spring), but finished 3rd behind Special Week.

After a summer break, the horse was entered in to the Sapporo Kinen. In that race, rather than taking the lead as he did in the previous year, the horse was placed in the rear of the pack; before moving up at the 3rd corner and taking the lead on the final stretch, beating Phalaenopsis by a half-length lead. This wound up being Seiun Sky's final victory in his career, with his next race, the Tenno Sho (Autumn), seeing him finishing 5th, and later developing tendonitis which forced him out of the race for over a year.

=== 2001: six-year old season ===
After a prolonged break to recover, Seiun Sky entered the Tenno Sho (Spring) of that year, but finished the race at last place with more than a 15 second gap between the winner, T M Opera O.

Following the race, there were plans to enter him in to the Takarazuka Kinen, but those plans were scrapped due to health issues, and after the horse hurt its radius in the summer it was decided that the horse would be retired.

== Stud career ==
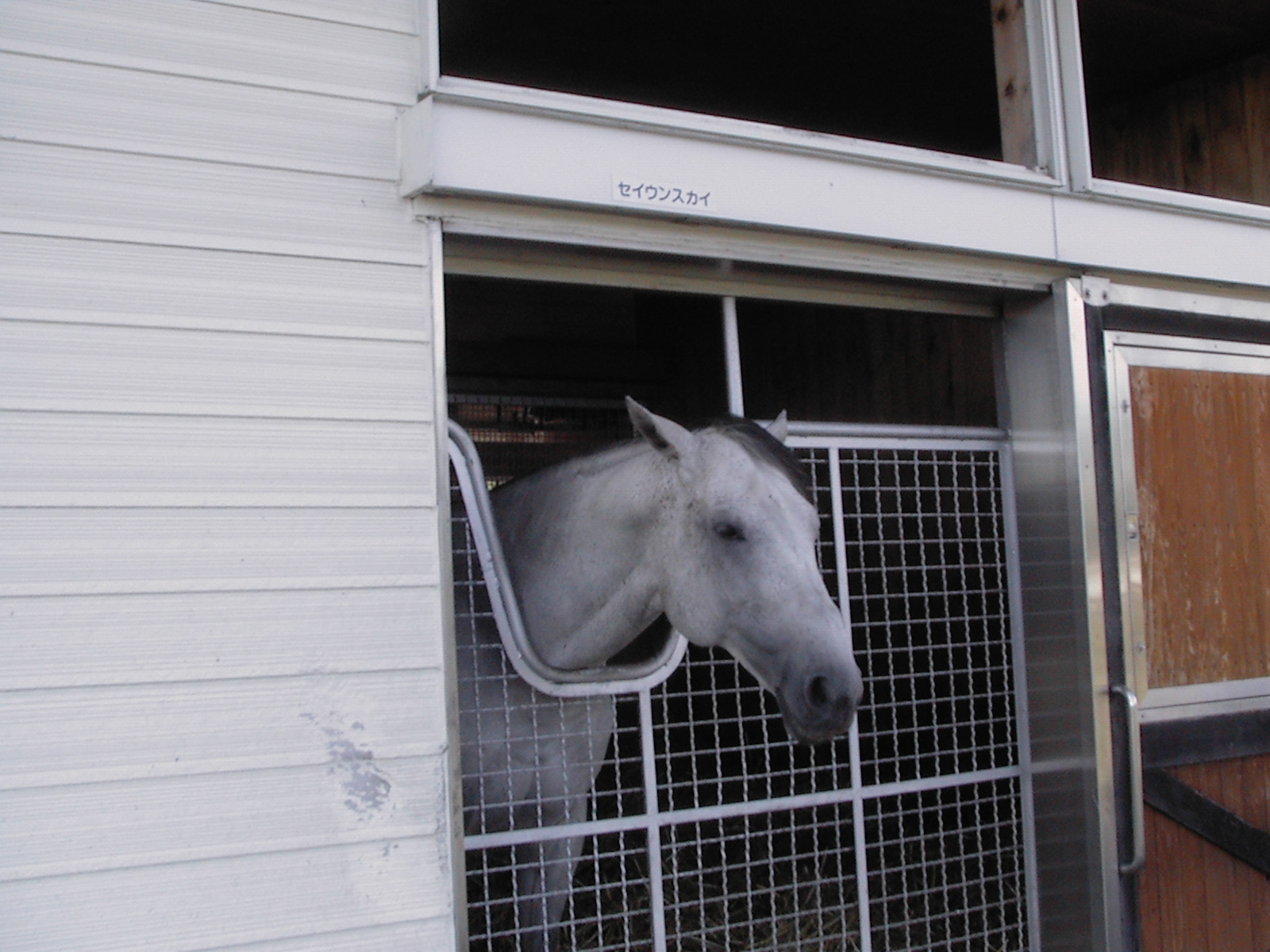
Seiun Sky in 2006.

After retiring, Seiun Sky was put to stud at the Arrow Stud before being moved to the Nishiyama Stud a few years later. To date his best progeny was Mayol, who came in third in the Fuyo Stakes.

On August 16, 2011, Seiun Sky passed away. While the JRA officially announced that the horse died from a heart attack, the horse's owner wrote on his blog that he died from hitting his head in his stable when he stood up. A gravestone was erected within the Nishiyama Stud property several months later.

== In popular culture ==
An anthropomorphized version of Seiun Sky appears as a character in the Japanese multimedia franchise Umamusume: Pretty Derby, voiced by Akari Kitō. She is depicted as a laid-back slacker who compensates for her unimpressive speed and stamina by using psychological manipulation and subversive running tactics to outpace faster opponents, earning a reputation as a devious trickster. Despite her tendencies to appear unsympathetic and not take others seriously, she is immensely compassionate and attentive towards close friends, particularly when she is with Nishino Flower, referencing how their real-life counterparts were stablemates owned by Nishiyama Stud.

== Racing form ==
The following racing form is based on information available on netkeiba.com.

Date	Age	Track	Race	Grade	Distance (Condition)	Entry	HN	Odds (Favored)	Finish	Time	Margins	Jockey	Winner (Runner-up)
Jan 5, 1998	3	Nakayama	4YO Debut		1600m（Good）	16	16	12.0（5）	1st	1:36.7	−1.0	Koji Tokuyoshi	(Meine Carol)
Jan 25, 1998	3	Nakayama	Junior Cup	OP	2000m（Firm）	11	2	6.8（3）	1st	2:03.5	−0.8	Koji Tokuyoshi	(Mega Hit)
Mar 8, 1998	3	Nakayama	Yayoi Sho	GII	2000m（Firm）	13	10	4.4（3）	2nd	2:01.9	0.1	Koji Tokuyoshi	Special Week
Apr 19, 1998	3	Nakayama	Satsuki Sho	GI	2000m（Firm）	18	3	5.4（2）	1st	2:01.3	−0.1	Norihiro Yokoyama	(King Halo)
Jun 7, 1998	3	Tokyo	Tokyo Yushun	GI	2400m（Good）	18	12	4.9（3）	4th	2:26.8	1.0	Norihiro Yokoyama	Special Week
Oct 11, 1998	3	Kyoto	Kyoto Daishoten	GII	2400m（Good）	7	1	6.0（4）	1st	2:25.6	−0.1	Norihiro Yokoyama	(Mejiro Bright)
Nov 8, 1998	3	Kyoto	Kikuka Sho	GI	3000m（Firm）	17	4	4.3（2）	1st	3:03.2 (Note: Set a stakes record for the event)	−0.6	Norihiro Yokoyama	(Special Week)
Dec 27, 1998	3	Nakayama	Arima Kinen	GI	2500m（Firm）	16	11	2.7（1）	4th	2:32.7	0.6	Norihiro Yokoyama	Grass Wonder
Mar 28, 1999	4	Nakayama	Nikkei Sho	GII	2500m（Good）	13	7	1.3（1）	1st	2:35.3	−0.9	Norihiro Yokoyama	(Seiun Area)
May 2, 1999	4	Kyoto	Tenno Sho (Spring)	GI	3200m（Firm）	12	8	2.8（2）	3rd	3:15.8	0.5	Norihiro Yokoyama	Special Week
Aug 22, 1999	4	Sapporo	Sapporo Kinen	GII	2000m（Firm）	10	3	1.4（1）	1st	2:00.1	−0.1	Norihiro Yokoyama	(Phalaenopsis)
Oct 31, 1999	4	Tokyo	Tenno Sho (Autumn)	GI	2000m（Firm）	17	7	3.8（1）	5th	1:58.3	0.3	Norihiro Yokoyama	Special Week
Apr 29, 2001	6	Kyoto	Tenno Sho (Spring)	GI	3200m（Firm）	12	6	22.2（6）	12th	3:32.0	15.8	Norihiro Yokoyama	T M Opera O

Legend:
Turf

== Pedigree ==
Pedigree of Seiun Sky
Sire Sheriff's Star 1985 gr.	Posse; 1977 ch.	Forli	Aristophanes
Sire Sheriff's Star 1985 gr.	Posse; 1977 ch.	Forli	Trevisa
Sire Sheriff's Star 1985 gr.	Posse; 1977 ch.	In Hot Pursuit	Bold Ruler
Sire Sheriff's Star 1985 gr.	Posse; 1977 ch.	In Hot Pursuit	Lady Be Good
Sire Sheriff's Star 1985 gr.	Castle Moon; 1975 gr.	Kalamoun	Zedaan
Sire Sheriff's Star 1985 gr.	Castle Moon; 1975 gr.	Kalamoun	Khairunissa
Sire Sheriff's Star 1985 gr.	Castle Moon; 1975 gr.	Fotheringay	Right Royal
Sire Sheriff's Star 1985 gr.	Castle Moon; 1975 gr.	Fotheringay	La Fresnes
Dam Sister Mill 1990 d.ch.	Mill George; 1975 b.	Mill Reef	Never Bend
Dam Sister Mill 1990 d.ch.	Mill George; 1975 b.	Mill Reef	Milan Mill
Dam Sister Mill 1990 d.ch.	Mill George; 1975 b.	Miss Charisma	Ragusa
Dam Sister Mill 1990 d.ch.	Mill George; 1975 b.	Miss Charisma	Matatina
Dam Sister Mill 1990 d.ch.	Sweet Angelet; 1985 b.	Mogami	Lyphard
Dam Sister Mill 1990 d.ch.	Sweet Angelet; 1985 b.	Mogami	No Luck
Dam Sister Mill 1990 d.ch.	Sweet Angelet; 1985 b.	Angelet Sweet	Colonel Symboli
Dam Sister Mill 1990 d.ch.	Sweet Angelet; 1985 b.	Angelet Sweet	Sweet France
