= Tokyo Okan Sho =

Japanese thoroughbred race

- Location: Ohi Racecourse
- Inaugurated: 1964
- Race type: Thoroughbred - Flat racing

Race information
- Distance: 1,800 meters
- Surface: Dirt
- Qualification: Three-year-old
- Weight: 54kg-57kg
- Purse: 1st: ¥40,000,000

The Tokyo Okan Sho (in Japanese: 東京王冠賞) was a horse race for three-year-olds at held Ohi Racecourse in Shinagawa, Tokyo, Japan.

== Race details ==
The race was held at various lengths throughout its existence including 2,000 meters, 2,400 meters and 2,600 meters before 1,800 meters was settled on for its last two races. All editions of the race took place at Ohi Racecourse.

The race was held during October and November for most of its existence, but later moved to June and May in its final years.

The final edition of the race was held on May 10, 2001.

== Past winners ==
Past winners include:

- 1964: Harroway Top
- 1965: Higashi Hero
- 1966: Kazusa Ryu
- 1967: Hikaru Takai
- 1968: Wealth Diver
- 1969: China Speed
- 1970: Ryu Tokitsu
- 1971: Goldtrap
- 1972: Sanko O Rikisu
- 1973: Marusan Fire
- 1974: Todoroki Musashi
- 1975: Golden Ribot
- 1976: Plus One
- 1977: Good Boy
- 1978: Hatsushiba O
- 1979: Daido Star
- 1980: Azuma King
- 1981: Nishikino Boy
- 1982: Misaki Never
- 1983: San Oi
- 1984: Rocky Tiger
- 1985: Chiyoyo Ace
- 1986: Hanaki O
- 1987: Inari One
- 1988: Aeroplane
- 1989: Rosita
- 1990: Adel Sieg
- 1991: Hashiru Shogun
- 1992: Grade Shori
- 1993: Blue Family
- 1994: Dolphin Boy
- 1995: Tsukifuku O
- 1996: Kikuno Win
- 1997: Surprise Power
- 1998: Hakata Big One
- 1999: Opera Hat
- 2000: Arrow Winner
- 2001: Toshin Blizzard

== See also ==
- Horse racing in Japan
- List of Japanese flat horse races
