= Silence Suzuka =

Japanese-bred Thoroughbred racehorse

Silence Suzuka サイレンススズカ
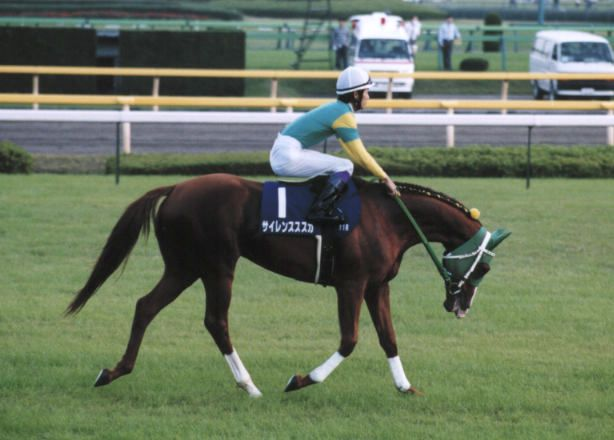
- Silence Suzuka at the 1998 Autumn Tennō Shō.
- Breed: Thoroughbred
- Sire: Sunday Silence
- Grandsire: Halo
- Dam: Wakia
- Damsire: Miswaki
- Sex: Stallion
- Foaled: May 1, 1994
- Died: November 1, 1998 (aged 4)
- Country: Japan
- Colour: Chestnut
- Breeder: Inahara Bokujho
- Owner: Keiji Nagai
- Racing colours
- Trainer: Mitsuru Hashida
- Jockey: Hiroyuki Uemura; Hiroshi Kawachi; Yutaka Take
- Record: 16: 9-1-0
- Earnings: ¥455,984,000

Major wins
- Principal Stakes (1997); Takarazuka Kinen (1998); Mainichi Okan (1998); Kinko Sho (1998); Nakayama Kinen (1998); Kokura Daishoten (1998)

Awards
- JRA Special Award (1998)

Silence Suzuka (Japanese: サイレンススズカ, Hepburn: Sairensu Suzuka; May 1, 1994 – November 1, 1998) was a Japanese Thoroughbred racehorse. He is known for winning the 1998 Takarazuka Kinen.

After debuting in 1997, Silence Suzuka's performance stabilized following a tactical shift in late 1997. In 1998, he won five consecutive graded stakes and secured a Grade I victory in the Takarazuka Kinen. During the 1998 Tenno Sho (Autumn), he suffered a terminal leg fracture and was subsequently euthanized.

== Racing career ==
=== 1997: three-year-old season ===
Silence Suzuka debuted on February 1, 1997, in a newcomer race at Kyoto Racecourse, winning by seven lengths with a time of 1:35.2. Following the win, he was sidelined with periostitis until the Yayoi Sho. In that race, he was delayed by starting gate difficulties and missed the start by approximately 10 lengths, ultimately finishing 8th. As a result, he was issued a 20-day suspension and required to retake a gate proficiency test.

After winning a 500m-below-class race in April, he won the Principal Stakes to secure a spot in the Tokyo Yushun (Japanese Derby). In the Derby, tactical attempts to slow him early in the race was unsuccessful, and he finished 9th. Following summer break and a 2nd-place finish in the Kobe Shimbun Hai, he contested the Tenno Sho (Autumn). Despite leading by 10 lengths at the third turn after setting a high pace (1000m in 58.5s), he finished 6th. This was followed by a 15th-place finish in the Mile Championship.

In December, Silence Suzuka traveled to Sha Tin Racecourse for the Hong Kong International Cup. Paired up with jockey Yutaka Take, he led through a 1000m split of 58.2s and finished 5th. Following this race, the stable decided to shift away from restraining his speed in favor of an unrestrained front-running style for the following season.

=== 1998: four-year-old season ===
In 1998, the stable focused on races between 1800m and 2000m. Silence Suzuka won the Valentine Stakes and the Nakayama Kinen before setting a course record of 1:46.5 in the Kokura Daishoten. In the Kinko Sho, he won by 11 lengths in a record time of 1:57.8. In the Takarazuka Kinen, with Katsumi Minai riding as a substitute, he defeated Stay Gold to secure his first Grade I title. Following summer break, he won the Mainichi Okan by 2.5 lengths over El Condor Pasa.

On November 1, 1998, during the Tenno Sho (Autumn), Silence Suzuka recorded a 57.4s split for the first 1000m, leading by approximately 15 lengths. Near the fourth turn, the horse slowed down and veered off track abruptly due to a comminuted fracture of the left carpal bone. He was transported by horse ambulance to the track clinic. Veterinarians deemed that the injury was irreparable, and Silence Suzuka was euthanized shortly thereafter at the age of 4.

== In popular culture ==
An anthropomorphized version of Silence Suzuka appears as a character in the Japanese multimedia franchise Umamusume: Pretty Derby, voiced by Marika Kōno. She is depicted as a softspoken yet kindhearted girl who oftentimes appears aloof due to her tendency to absorb herself in racing. She is an incredibly talented front runner and the subject of admiration from her roommate, Special Week. However, she is often hospitalized due to suffering serious injuries that parallel circumstances of her real-life counterpart's death, which is reflected in the first season of the anime series, the manga spinoff series Star Blossom, and alluded to heavily during her chapter in the game's story mode.

== Racing form ==
Silence Suzuka had won nine races out of 16 starts. The data available is based on JBIS, netkeiba and HKJC.

Date	Age	Track	Race	Grade	Distance (Condition)	Entry	HN	Odds (Favored)	Finish	Time	Margins	Jockey	Winner (Runner-up)
Feb 1, 1997	3	Kyoto	3yo Newcomer		1,600 m (Firm)	11	1	1.3 (1)	1st	1:35.2	–1.1	Hiroyuki Uemura	(Pulsebeat)
Mar 2, 1997	3	Nakayama	Yayoi Sho	2	2,000 m (Firm)	14	8	3.5 (2)	8th	2:03.7	1.5	Hiroyuki Uemura	Running Gale
Apr 5, 1997	3	Hanshin	3yo Allowance	1W	2,000 m (Soft)	12	5	1.2 (1)	1st	2:03.0	–1.1	Hiroyuki Uemura	(Long Miguel)
May 10, 1997	3	Tokyo	Principal Stakes	OP	2,200 m (Firm)	16	11	2.3 (2)	1st	2:13.4	0.0	Hiroyuki Uemura	(Matikanefukukitaru)
Jun 1, 1997	3	Tokyo	Tokyo Yushun	1	2,400 m (Firm)	17	8	8.6 (4)	9th	2:27.0	1.1	Hiroyuki Uemura	Sunny Brian
Sep 14, 1997	3	Hanshin	Kobe Shimbun Hai	2	2,000 m (Firm)	11	8	2.1 (1)	2nd	2:00.2	0.2	Hiroyuki Uemura	Matikanefukukitaru
Oct 26, 1997	3	Tokyo	Tennō Shō (Autumn)	1	2,000 m (Firm)	16	9	17.6 (4)	6th	2:00.0	1.0	Hiroshi Kawachi	Air Groove
Nov 16, 1997	3	Kyoto	Mile Championship	1	1,600 m (Firm)	18	10	19.1 (6)	15th	1:36.2	2.9	Hiroshi Kawachi	Taiki Shuttle
Dec 14, 1997	3	Sha Tin	The Hong Kong International Cup	2	1,800 m (Firm)	14	13	21.0 (7)	5th	1:47.5	0.3	Yutaka Take	Val's Prince
Feb 14, 1998	4	Tokyo	Valentine Stakes	OP	1,800 m (Firm)	12	12	1.5 (1)	1st	1:46.3	–0.7	Yutaka Take	(Horse's Neck)
Mar 15, 1998	4	Nakayama	Nakayama Kinen	2	1,800 m (Firm)	9	9	1.4 (1)	1st	1:48.6	–0.3	Yutaka Take	(Rosen Kavalier)
Apr 18, 1998	4	Chukyo	Kokura Daishoten	3	1,800 m (Firm)	16	14	1.2 (1)	1st	R1:46.5	–0.5	Yutaka Take	(Tsurumaru Gaisen)
May 30, 1998	4	Chukyo	Kinko Sho	2	2,000 m (Firm)	9	5	2.0 (1)	1st	R1:57.8	–1.8	Yutaka Take	(Midnight Bet)
Jul 12, 1998	4	Hanshin	Takarazuka Kinen	1	2,200 m (Firm)	13	13	2.8 (1)	1st	2:11.9	–0.1	Katsumi Minai	(Stay Gold)
Oct 10, 1998	4	Tokyo	Mainichi Okan	2	1,800 m (Firm)	9	2	1.4 (1)	1st	1:44.9	–0.4	Yutaka Take	(El Condor Pasa)
Nov 1, 1998	4	Tokyo	Tennō Shō (Autumn)	1	2,000 m (Firm)	12	1	1.2 (1)	DNF	–	–	Yutaka Take	Offside Trap

Legend:
Turf

- R indicated that it was a record finish time.

== Pedigree ==
Pedigree of Silence Suzuka (JPN), chestnut horse 1994
Sire Sunday Silence (USA) 1986	Halo (USA) 1969	Hail to Reason	Turn-To
Sire Sunday Silence (USA) 1986	Halo (USA) 1969	Hail to Reason	Nothirdchance
Sire Sunday Silence (USA) 1986	Halo (USA) 1969	Cosmah	Cosmic Bomb
Sire Sunday Silence (USA) 1986	Halo (USA) 1969	Cosmah	Almahmoud
Sire Sunday Silence (USA) 1986	Wishing Well (USA) 1975	Understanding	Promised Land
Sire Sunday Silence (USA) 1986	Wishing Well (USA) 1975	Understanding	Pretty Ways
Sire Sunday Silence (USA) 1986	Wishing Well (USA) 1975	Mountain Flower	Montparnasse
Sire Sunday Silence (USA) 1986	Wishing Well (USA) 1975	Mountain Flower	Edel Weiss
Dam Wakia (USA) 1987 (FNo: 9)	Miswaki (USA) 1978	Mr. Prospector	Raise a Native
Dam Wakia (USA) 1987 (FNo: 9)	Miswaki (USA) 1978	Mr. Prospector	Gold Digger
Dam Wakia (USA) 1987 (FNo: 9)	Miswaki (USA) 1978	Hopespringseternal	Buckpasser
Dam Wakia (USA) 1987 (FNo: 9)	Miswaki (USA) 1978	Hopespringseternal	Rose Bower
Dam Wakia (USA) 1987 (FNo: 9)	Rascal Rascal (USA) 1981	Ack Ack	Battle Joined
Dam Wakia (USA) 1987 (FNo: 9)	Rascal Rascal (USA) 1981	Ack Ack	Fast Turn
Dam Wakia (USA) 1987 (FNo: 9)	Rascal Rascal (USA) 1981	Savage Bunny	Never Bend
Dam Wakia (USA) 1987 (FNo: 9)	Rascal Rascal (USA) 1981	Savage Bunny	Tudor Jet

== See also ==
- List of racehorses
