= Larkspur (horse) =

Irish-bred Thoroughbred racehorse

- Racing silks of Raymond R. Guest
- Sire: Never Say Die
- Grandsire: Nasrullah
- Dam: Skylarking
- Damsire: Woodlark
- Sex: Stallion
- Foaled: January 1959
- Country: Ireland
- Colour: Chestnut
- Breeder: Philip Love
- Owner: Raymond R. Guest
- Trainer: Vincent O'Brien
- Record: 10: 3-1-1

Major wins
- Epsom Derby (1962)

Larkspur was an Irish Thoroughbred racehorse and sire who won the Derby in 1962. He was the first of six Derby winners trained by Vincent O'Brien at Ballydoyle. Larkspur achieved little of note either before or after his Epsom triumph.

== Background ==
Larkspur, a light chestnut horse with a white blaze, was bred in Ireland by Philip Love. His sire, the American-bred Derby winner Never Say Die, was a qualified success at stud, getting the double Classic winner Never Too Late and becoming Champion Sire in 1962, largely thanks to Larkspur's earnings. Apart from Larkspur, his dam Skylarking produced eight winners, the best being the 1965 Dante Stakes winner Ballymarais. Ballymarais ran in the 2000 Guineas and was nearest at finish at 33-1, and when the weights for the Dante were published he carried only 7.11 and was 1-4 on for the race, which he duly won, he was trained by Bill Gray, owned by Bill Stoker and ridden by Brian Connorton.

Larkspur was sent as a yearling to the Ballsbridge Sales where he was bought for 12,200gns by Vincent O'Brien on behalf of the American businessman Raymond R. Guest

== Racing career ==
=== 1961: two-year-old season ===
Larkspur made little impression on his debut, finishing unplaced in a maiden race at Leopardstown in the summer of 1961. After a break he returned to Leopardstown in September to record his first win, taking a maiden race by three lengths. He was strongly fancied for the National Stakes later in the month, in which he finished a close third behind Mystery.

On his final start of the year, Larkspur was sent to England for the Observer Gold Cup at Doncaster in October. He made little impression and finished unplaced behind Miralgo.

=== 1962: three-year-old season ===
Larkspur's unremarkable form continued into 1962 as he finished unplaced in the Madrid Handicap over seven furlongs at the Curragh on his reappearance. In May however, he was moved up in distance and earned his place in the Derby field by winning the Wills Gold Flake Stakes over one and a half miles at Leopardstown. The runner-up, Sicilian Prince, went on to win the Prix Royal Oak. Larkspur suffered a setback in his training shortly afterwards and his participation in the Derby was only confirmed a few days before the race.

At Epsom, in front of a crowd estimated at 400,000, Larkspur was sent off a 22/1 outsider in a field of twenty-six, being perceived as O'Brien's second string. The race was marred by an incident just after half way, in which seven horses, including the favourite Hethersett either fell or were brought down; one horse was killed and four jockeys were detained in hospital as a result. Larkspur's Australian jockey Neville Sellwood could not offer an explanation for the incident but said that "the horses fell right in front of me...I had a narrow escape". Larkspur took the lead two furlongs out and stayed on strongly in the closing stages to win by two lengths from the French-trained colts Arcor and Le Cantilien.

Larkspur failed to reproduce his Derby-winning form in three subsequent races. At the end of June he finished fourth at the Curragh behind the French-trained Tambourine when 9/4 favourite for the Irish Derby. His rider, Scobie Breasley, offered no excuses, saying that Larkspur "could never get in a real blow". He returned to the Curragh in autumn and started odds-on favourite for the Blandford Stakes, but was narrowly beaten by Sicilian Prince. He was sent to Doncaster for the St Leger, but could finish only sixth of the fifteen runners behind Hethersett.

== Assessment and Honours ==
In their book A Century of Champions, John Randall and Tony Morris rated Larkspur a "poor" Derby winner.

The only lasting memorial to Larkspur's achievements is Larkspur Park near his training base in Cashel, County Tipperary which includes a "globally renowned" pitch and putt golf course.

== Stud career ==
Larkspur stood as a stallion in Ireland for three seasons before being exported to Japan in 1967. He made little impact as a stallion in either country.

== Pedigree ==
Pedigree of Larkspur (GB), chestnut stallion, 1959
Sire Never Say Die (USA) 1951	Nasrullah; 1940	Nearco	Pharos
Sire Never Say Die (USA) 1951	Nasrullah; 1940	Nearco	Nogara
Sire Never Say Die (USA) 1951	Nasrullah; 1940	Mumtaz Begum	Blenheim
Sire Never Say Die (USA) 1951	Nasrullah; 1940	Mumtaz Begum	Mumtaz Mahal
Sire Never Say Die (USA) 1951	Singing Grass; 1944	War Admiral	Man o' War
Sire Never Say Die (USA) 1951	Singing Grass; 1944	War Admiral	Brushup
Sire Never Say Die (USA) 1951	Singing Grass; 1944	Boreale	Vatout*
Sire Never Say Die (USA) 1951	Singing Grass; 1944	Boreale	Galaday
Dam Skylarking (GB) 1950	Precipitation; 1933	Hurry On	Marcovil
Dam Skylarking (GB) 1950	Precipitation; 1933	Hurry On	Tout Suite
Dam Skylarking (GB) 1950	Precipitation; 1933	Double Life	Bachelors Double
Dam Skylarking (GB) 1950	Precipitation; 1933	Double Life	Saint Joan
Dam Skylarking (GB) 1950	Woodlark; 1944	Bois Roussel	Vatout
Dam Skylarking (GB) 1950	Woodlark; 1944	Bois Roussel	Plucky Liege
Dam Skylarking (GB) 1950	Woodlark; 1944	Aurora	Hyperion
Dam Skylarking (GB) 1950	Woodlark; 1944	Aurora	Rose Red (Family: 1-w)

- Larkspur was inbred 4x4 to the 1929 Poule d'Essai des Poulains winner Vatout. This means that the stallion appears twice in the fourth generation of his pedigree.
