= Tokyo Princess Sho =

Japanese thoroughbred race

Tokyo Princess Sho 東京プリンセス賞
- Class: South Kanto Grade I (SI)
- Location: Oi Racecourse, Shinagawa, Tokyo
- Inaugurated: 1987; 39 years ago
- Race type: Thoroughbred - Flat racing

Race information
- Distance: 1,800 meters
- Surface: Dirt
- Track: Right-handed
- Qualification: Three-year-old fillies from South Kanto
- Weight: 54kg-56kg
- Purse: 1st: ¥20,000,000 (as of 2023)

The Tokyo Princess Sho (in Japanese: 東京プリンセス賞), is a Japanese thoroughbred horse race for three-year-old fillies open only to horses from South Kanto at Ohi Racecourse. It is graded as a South Kanto Grade I. It is run over a distance of 1,800 meters (about 9 furlongs) at Ohi Racecourse in Shinagawa, Tokyo in April or May.

== Race details ==
The first edition of the race took place on July 12, 1987.

The race was initially held in June and July, but is now held during April and May.

The track distance is 1800 meters, except for the 16th and 17th races, which were held over 1790m due to construction work on the stands at the racecourse.

== Winners since 2010 ==
Year	Winner	Jockey	Trainer	Owner	Organization	Time
2010	Tosen Witch	Takashi Harita	Shoichi Kawashima	Takaya Shimakawa	Funabashi	1:55.1
2011	Manierisme	Keita Tosaki	Masayuki Kawashima	Teruya Yoshida	Funabashi	1:54.3
2012	Asuka Libre	Tadanari Konno	Masayuki Kawashima	Toshihiro Sakamoto	Funabashi	1:53.5
2013	Kaikayoso	Tadanari Konno	Masayuki Kawashima	Carrot Farm Co. Ltd.	Funabashi	1:55.9
2014	Smart Babel	Ryōya Sawada	Shoichi Kawashima	Toru Okawa	Funabashi	1:55.0
2015	T's a Rise	Takayuki Yano	Yukiharu Shimada	Shinji Tachiyama	Ohi	1:54.2
2016	Linda Linda	Makiaki Kuwamura	Katsunori Arayama	MMC Co. Ltd.	Ohi	1:55.8
2017	Ange Joli	Tsubasa Ayukawa	Satoshi Kokubo	Koichi Takeshita	Urawa	1:56.3
2018	Graviola	Tadanari Konno	Kenji Sato	Kiji Murata	Funabashi	1:53.1
2019	Tosen Garnet	Seiji Saki	Satoshi Kokubo	Takaya Shimakawa	Urawa	1:55.6
2020	Aqua Libre	Takayuki Yano	Kenji Sato	Shinsei Farm Co. Ltd.	Funabashi	1:54.4
2021	Cerasus Via	Taito Mori	Satoshi Kokubo	Yoshio Oda	Urawa	1:54.2
2022	Speedy Kick	Norifumi Mikamoto	Tomoyuki Fujiwara	Suzuyuki Kato	Urawa	1:53.5
2023	Surf's Up	Norifumi Mikamoto	Takayuki Yamashita	Teruya Yoshida	Funabashi	1:53.4

== Past winners ==
Past winners include:

- 1987:Daitaku Genius
- 1988: Ishino Lucky
- 1989: Fujino Dancer
- 1990: Big One Shot
- 1991: Keiwan Heart
- 1992: Charm Dancer
- 1993: Aconite Roman
- 1994: K.F.Neptune
- 1995: Heiwan Reef
- 1996: Sugiyama Wassl
- 1997: Miss Judi
- 1998: Hokuto Aurora
- 1999: Dear Victy
- 2000: Ein Ein
- 2001: Nami
- 2002: Salsa Queen
- 2003: D S Maiden
- 2004: Blue Robbery
- 2005: Tensei Fuji
- 2006: Charm Asleep
- 2007: Agnes Turf
- 2008: Bride's Mate
- 2009: Nefer Memory

== See also ==
- Horse racing in Japan
- List of Japanese flat horse races
- National Association of Racing
