= Ohi Racecourse =

Racecourse in Shinagawa, Tokyo, Japan

Coordinates: 35°35′28.82″N 139°44′33.39″E

Ohi Racecourse 大井競馬場
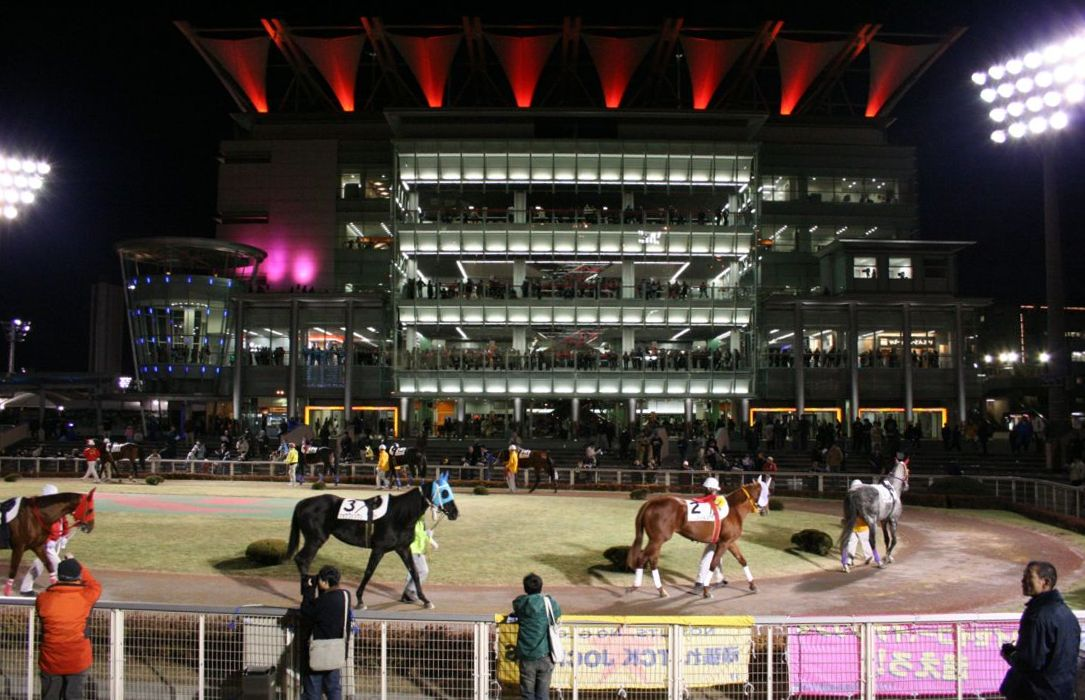
- Paddock at the Ohi Racecourse
- Interactive map of Ohi Racecourse 大井競馬場
- Location: Shinagawa, Tokyo, Japan
- Owned by: Tokyo Keiba Inc.
- Date opened: 1950
- Course type: Flat
- Notable races: Tokyo Daishoten; Teio Sho; Japan Dirt Derby

Ohi Racecourse (大井競馬場, Ōi Keiba-jō), also known as Tokyo City Keiba (TCK), is located in Shinagawa, Tokyo, Japan. Built in 1950 for horse racing, on weekends it also hosts one of the largest Tokyo-area flea markets.

The racecourse is located near Ōi Keibajō Mae Station on the Tokyo Monorail.

In August 1995, a friendly exchange agreement was signed with Santa Anita Park in Arcadia, California. The Tokyo City Cup held annually at Santa Anita Park in Arcadia honors the partnership between the American racetrack and Ohi Racecourse. In recognition of their relationship, TCK holds "Santa Anita Week" each summer which features the one mile G3 "Santa Anita Trophy".

== Notable races ==
Month	Race	Distance	Age/Sex
Grade I (International)
December	Tokyo Daishōten	2000m	3yo +
Jpn Grade I
April	Haneda Hai	1800m	3yo
June	Tokyo Derby	2000m	3yo
June	Teio Sho	2000m	4yo +
October	Japan Dirt Classic	2000m	3yo
Jpn Grade II
March	Keihin Hai	1700m	3yo
October	Ladies' Prelude	1800m	3yo f/m +
October	Tōkyo Hai	1200m	3yo +
Jpn Grade III
February	Kumotori Sho	1800m	3yo
April	Tokyo Sprint	1200m	4yo +
SI (South Kanto)
May	Tokyo Princess Sho	1800m	3yo f
October	Haiseiko Kinen	1600m	2yo
December	Tokyo Nisai Yūshun Himba	1600m	2yo f
SII (South Kanto)
February	Kinpai	2600m	4yo +
June	Yūshun Sprint	1200m	3yo
September	Tokyo Kinen	2400m	3yo +
November	Mile Grand Prix	1600m	3yo +
December	Katsushima Okan	1800m	3yo +
SIII (South Kanto)
March	Fujino Wave Kinen	1400m	4yo +
April	Brilliant Cup	1800m	4yo +
August	Santa Anita Trophy	1600m	3yo +
August	Kuroshio Hai	1800m	3yo
September	After 5 Star Sho	1200m	3yo +
September	Gold Junior	1400m	2yo
December	Gemstone Sho	1200m	2yo
December	Tokyo Cinderella Mile	1600m	3yo f/m +

== Former races ==
- Tokyo Okan Sho - Ended in 2001

== Track records ==
Source：TCK Record

- † Reference Time.
- Last updated on October 4, 2023.

Distance	Time	Racehorse	Sex	Weight	Jockey	Date Recorded
1000m	57.7	Noah Vigorous	Mare 5	51kg	Genki Fujimoto	June 29, 2023
1200m	1:10.0	Don Frankie	Horse 4	56kg	Kenichi Ikezoe	October 4, 2023
1400m	1:23.0	Agari Speed	Colt 3	53kg	Kiyomatsu Akama	August 30, 1977
Inner 1500m	1:31.5	Kikumatsu O	Mare 4	53kg	Takemi Sasaki	June 14, 1980
Inner 1600m	1:37.2	Adjudi Mitsuo	Horse 5	57kg	Hiroyuki Uchida	April 12, 2006
Left 1650m	1:42.3	Sabuno Hakutaka	Horse 5	57kg	Tsubasa Sasagawa	September 22, 2023
1700m	1:43.2	Mutsu Hikari	Horse 5	52kg	Motohiro Akamine	July 12, 1977
1800m	1:49.6	Miracle Legend	Mare 4	55kg	Yasunari Iwata	November 3, 2011
2000m	2:00.4	Smart Falcon	Horse 5	57kg	Yutaka Take	December 29, 2010
2400m	2:29.7	Good Boy	Colt 3	57kg	Saburō Takahashi	November 4, 1977
2600m	2:42.8	Agnes Chikara	Horse 5	55kg	Tsuneo Takayanagi	May 27, 1977

== See also ==
- National Association of Racing
