= Tokyo Kinen =

Japanese thoroughbred race

Tokyo Kinen 東京記念
- Class: South Kanto Grade II (SII)
- Location: Ohi Racecourse
- Inaugurated: 1964
- Race type: Thoroughbred flat racing

Race information
- Distance: 2,400 meters
- Surface: Dirt
- Qualification: Three-year-old and over belong to South Kanto region
- Weight: 56 kg for colts and geldings 54 kg for fillies and mares Allowances; 1 kg for 3-year-olds 3 kg for S. Hemisphere 3-year-olds
- Purse: 1st: ¥30,000,000 (2025)

The Tokyo Kinen (in Japanese: 東京記念), is a horse race for three-years-old and over at Ohi Racecourse in Shinagawa, Tokyo, Japan.

== Race details ==
The name of the race has its origins with the 1964 Tokyo Olympics, and its original name was the "Tokyo Olympics Kinen".

The race is 2,400 meters long and is run on dirt. All editions of the race have taken place at Ohi Racecourse.

The race has always been held in the fall, with it originally being held in October or November, but now in September.

== Winners since 2015 ==
Winners since 2015 include

Year	Winner	Affiliate	Jockey	Trainer	Owner	Time
2015	Pretiolas	Ohi	Kota Motohashi	Junpei Morishita	Yasuaki Date	2:34.5
2016	Eurobeat	Ohi	Hiroto Yoshihara	Kazuo Watanabe	Kazumi Yoshida	2:38.9
2017	Sabuno Kurohyo	Ohi	Joji Wada	Kazumasa Sakamoto	Saburo Nakagawa	2:36.4
2018	Stern Glanz	Urawa	Fumio Matoba	Satoshi Kokubo	Takatoshi Sakai	2:36.5
2019	Strike Eagle	Ohi	Hiroto Yoshihara	Terunobu Fujita	Carrot Farm Co. Ltd.	2:36.2
2020	Sound True	Funabashi	Taito Mori	Yuta Sato	Hiroshi Yamada	2:33.8
2021	Freccia Bianca	Funabashi	Norifumi Mikamoto	Masakazu Kawashima	Kazuo Okubo	2:37.0
2022	Ranryo O	Urawa	Kota Motohashi	Satoshi Kokubo	Masazo Itoi	2:35.3
2023	Seika Meteo Polis	Ohi	Hiroto Yoshihara	Kazuo Watanabe	Koichi Hoshika	2:34.0
2024	Nudge	Ohi	Takayuki Yano	Kenji Sano	Hiromi Wada	2:37.6
2025	Marukan Lani	Ohi	Masahiro Matsuzaki	Tsuyoshi Takano	Kansuke Saito	2:35.3

== Past winners ==
Past winners include:

- 1964: Royal Knight
- 1965: Oshachi
- 1966: Soronao
- 1967: Toyokame O
- 1968: Wealth Shiyou
- 1969: Yashima National
- 1970: Dainiki Yokuto
- 1971: Kayanuma Time
- 1972: Sachihibiki
- 1973: Craft Cologne
- 1974: Todoroki Musashi
- 1975: Inter Hiryu
- 1976: Iron Boy
- 1977: Rose Jack
- 1978: Hatsushiba O
- 1979: Tiger Musashi
- 1980: Power Pride
- 1981: Todoroki Eikan
- 1982: Trust Hawk
- 1983: Kaneden Tosho
- 1984: Chuo Regal
- 1985: Rocky Tiger
- 1986: Tom Count
- 1987: Shinano George
- 1988: Dash Hosho
- 1989: Super Mist
- 1990: Champion Star
- 1991: Daiko Galdan
- 1992: Dollar Okan
- 1993: White Silver
- 1994: Gangadin
- 1995: Yoshino King
- 1996: Tetsuno Sengoku O
- 1997: Makiba Silent
- 1998: Concert Boy
- 1999: Makiba Sniper
- 2000: Inari Concorde
- 2001: Makiba Sniper
- 2002: On Your Mark
- 2003: Name Value
- 2004: Shako Open
- 2005: Bonneville Record
- 2006: Muzzle Blast
- 2007: Ueno Maru Kun
- 2008: Loose Limbed
- 2009: Loose Limbed
- 2010: Serene
- 2011: Terra the Cloud
- 2012: Smart Impulse
- 2013: Pretiolas
- 2014: Eurobeat

== See also ==
- Horse racing in Japan
- List of Japanese flat horse races
