= Kimpai (race) =

Japanese thoroughbred race

Kimpai 金盃
- Class: South Kanto Grade II (SII)
- Location: Ohi Racecourse
- Inaugurated: September 13, 1956
- Race type: Thoroughbred - Flat racing

Race information
- Distance: 2,600 meters
- Surface: Dirt
- Track: Right-handed
- Qualification: Four-year-olds
- Weight: 52kg-56kg
- Purse: 1st: ¥22,000,000 (as of 2023)

The Kimpai (Japanese: 金盃) is a Japanese thoroughbred horse race for four-year-olds open only to horses from South Kanto at Ohi Racecourse, in Shinagawa, Tokyo. It is graded as a South Kanto Grade II. It is run over a distance of 2600 meters (about 13 furlongs) in February.

== Race details ==
The race is 2,600 meters in length and run on a dirt track, usually in February.

== Winners since 2010 ==
Year	Winner	Jockey	Trainer	Owner	Organization	Time
2010	Muzzle Blast	Keita Tosaki	Masayuki Kawashima	Teruya Yoshida	Funabashi	2:06.1
2011	Super Power	Daisuke Mashima	Hiroshi Takami	Grand Bokujo Co. Ltd.	Ohi	2:03.1
2012	Tosen Luce	Takashi Harita	Shoichi Kawashima	Takaya Shimakawa	Funabashi	2:05.9
2013	Tosen Luce	Takashi Harita	Shoichi Kawashima	Takaya Shimakawa	Funabashi	2:07.4
2014	Fortified	Keita Tosaki	Teronobu Fujita	Katsumi Yoshida	Ohi	2:06.5
2015	Outgeneral	Norifumi Mikamoto	Teronobu Fujita	Sunday Racing Co. Ltd.	Ohi	2:48.6
2016	Giardino	Daisuke Mashima	Katsunori Arayama	Masashi Yoshida	Ohi	2:50.2
2017	Euro Beat	Hiroto Yoshihara	Kazuo Watanabe	Kazumi Yoshida	Ohi	2:51.6
2018	Courage d'Or	Taito Mori	Shoichi Kawashima	Shadai Race Horse Co. Ltd.	Funabashi	2:50.3
2019	Sound True	Norifumi Mikamoto	Yuta Sato	Hiroshi Yamada	Funabashi	2:49.8
2020	Sound True	Taito Mori	Yuta Sato	Hiroshi Yamada	Funabashi	2:49.2
2021	Mangan	Hiroto Yoshihara	Juichi Tajima	Oguri Yoshikazu	Kawasaki	2:46.1
2022	Freccia Bianca	Norifumi Mikamoto	Shoichi Kawashima	Kazuo Okubo	Funabashi	2:47.1
2023	Kile	Norifumi Mikamoto	Satoshi Kokubo	Takaya Shimakawa	Urawa	2:49.2
2024	Ranryo O	Kota Motohashi	Satoshi Kokubo	Masazo Itoi	Urawa	2:52.9
2025	Kirinji	Tsubasa Sasagawa	Kazuo Watanabe	Koji Oka	Ohi	2:49.8
2026	Gluhwurm	Takayuki Yano	Katsuyoshi Uchida	Carrot Farm Co. Ltd.	Kawasaki	2:50.1

== Past winners ==
Past winners include:

- 1956: Nancy Shine
- 1957: Ichi Kanto
- 1958: Yoshifusa
- 1959: Yusei
- 1960: Dancer
- 1961: Oyuki
- 1962: Hajimeo
- 1963: Sakimidori
- 1964: Kokuyu
- 1965: Shiyun Yu
- 1966: Scarlet
- 1967: Wealth One
- 1968: Ichi Wells
- 1969: Yoshimi Junior
- 1970: Apo Speed
- 1971: Hidaka Suzuran
- 1972: Sano Hikari
- 1973: Maruichi King
- 1974: Juraku
- 1975: Maruichi Daio
- 1976: Chuo Captain
- 1977: Kane Oe
- 1978: No race
- 1979: Hatsu Mamoru
- 1980: Tagawa King
- 1981: Azuma King
- 1982: Silver Moriyuki
- 1983: Seiko Reman
- 1984: Chuo Regal
- 1985: Rocky Tiger
- 1986: Countess Up
- 1987: Mihama Shark
- 1988: Champion Star
- 1989: Super Mist
- 1990: Daiko Galdan
- 1991: Ciro Land
- 1992: Goal Self
- 1993: Suruga Spain
- 1994: Tsukino Ichiban
- 1995: Amazon Opera
- 1996: Concert Boy
- 1997: Tetsuno Sengoku O
- 1998: Grand Prix Kun
- 1999: Minamino Jack
- 2000: Inari Concorde
- 2001: Intelli Power
- 2002: Intelli Power
- 2003: Coreless Hunter
- 2004: Coreless Hunter
- 2005: Brown Chatelet
- 2006: Maple Eight
- 2007: Bonneville Record
- 2008: Loose Limbed
- 2009: Bagpipe Wind

== See also ==
- Horse racing in Japan
- List of Japanese flat horse races
- National Association of Racing
