= Kyoto Shimbun Hai =

Kyoto Shimbun Hai 京都新聞杯
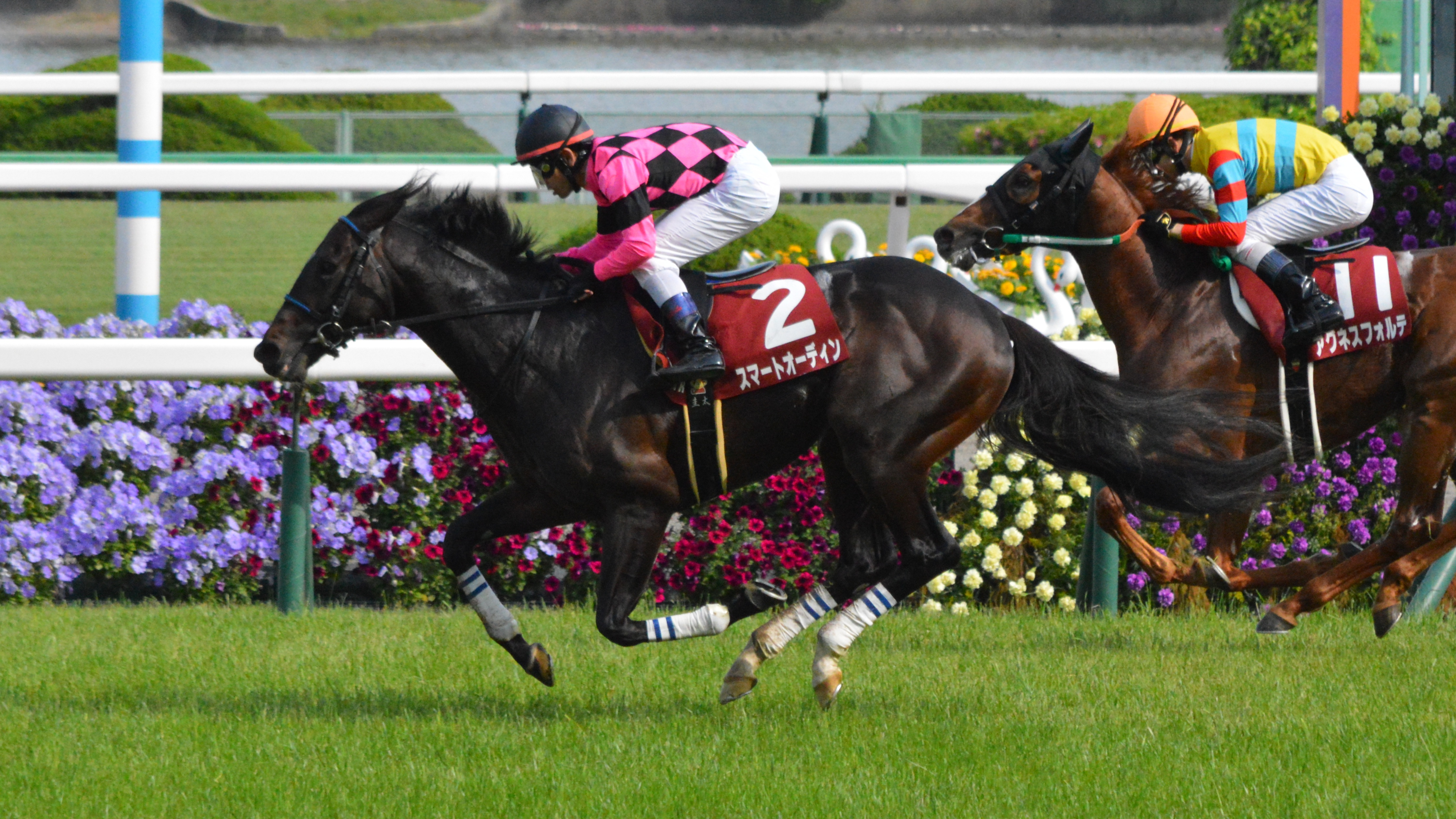
- 2016 Kyoto Shimbun Hai
- Class: Grade 2
- Location: Kyoto Racecourse
- Race type: Thoroughbred Flat racing

Race information
- Distance: 2,200 meters
- Surface: Turf
- Track: Right-handed
- Qualification: 3-y-o
- Weight: 57 kg Allowance: Fillies 2 kg
- Purse: ¥ 117,540,000 (as of 2025): 1st: ¥ 54,000,000; 2nd: ¥ 22,000,000; 3rd: ¥ 14,000,000

The Kyoto Shimbun Hai (Japanese 京都新聞杯) is a Grade 2 flat horse race in Japan for three-year-old Thoroughbreds. It is run over a distance of 2200 metres at Kyoto Racecourse in May.

The Kyoto Shimbun Hai was first run in 1953 and was elevated to Grade 2 status in 1984. It serves as a trial race for the Grade 1 flat horse race Tokyo Yushun. It was run over a variety of distances in its early history before being contested over 2000 metres from 1966. The distance was increased to 2200 metres in 1984 although it was run over 2000 metres again in 2000 and 2001.

Among the winners of the race have been Katsuragi Ace, Mihono Bourbon, Special Week, Admire Vega, Agnes Flight, Heart's Cry and Kizuna.

== Winners since 2000 ==
Year	Winner	Jockey	Trainer	Owner	Time
2000	Agnes Flight	Hiroshi Kawachi	Hiroyuki Nagahama	Takao Watanabe	1:59.8
2001	Tenzan Seiza	Hideaki Miyuki	Hideaki Fujiwara	Saburo Hirano	1:59.8
2002	Fast Tateyama	Hiroki Goto	Isao Yasuda	Yukio Tsuji	2:12.5
2003	Marble Chief	Kenichi Ikezoe	Kiyohiro Tadokoro	Nao Shimomura	2:15.4
2004	Heart's Cry	Katsumi Ando	Kojiro Hahiguchi	Shadai Race Horse	2:11.9
2005	Inti Raimi	Tetsuzo Sato	Shozo Sasaki	Sunday Racing	2:13.0
2006	Toho Alan	Shinji Fujita	Hideaki Fujiwara	Toho Bussan	2:14.8
2007	Tascata Sorte	Yasunari Iwata	Hideaki Fujiwara	Shadai Race Horse	2:13.5
2008	Meisho Qualia	Yasunari Iwata	Toyoji Nihihashi	Yoshio Matsumoto	2:18.4
2009	Best Member	Hirofumi Shii	Hiroshi Miyamoto	Shinji Maeda	2:13.0
2010	Gestalt	Kenichi Ikezoe	Hiroyuki Nagahama	Hiroshi Hatasa	2:12.8
2011	Cresco Grand	Yutaka Take	Sei Ishikaza	Saburo Horikawa	2:13.5
2012	Tosen Homareboshi	Craig Williams	Yasutoshi Ikee	Takaya Shimakawa	2:10.0
2013	Kizuna	Yutaka Take	Shozo Sasaki	Shinji Maeda	2:12.3
2014	Hagino Hybrid	Shinichiro Akiyama	Kunihide Matsuda	Kokichi Hikuma	2:11.0
2015	Satono Rasen	Yuga Kawada	Yasutoshi Ikee	Hajime Satomi	2:11.3
2016	Smart Odin	Keita Tosaki	Kunihide Matsuda	Tohru Okawa	2:12.6
2017	Platinum Bullet	Suguru Hamanaka	Hiroshi Kawachi	Normandy Thoroughbred Racing	2:15.2
2018	Stay Foolish	Yusuke Fujioka	Yoshito Yahagi	Shadai Race Horse	2:11.0
2019	Red Genial	Manabu Sakai	Yoshitada Takahashi	Tokyo Horse Racing	2:11.9
2020	Deep Bond	Ryuji Wada	Ryuji Okubo	Shinji Maeda	2:11.7
2021^{[a]}	Red Genesis	Yuga Kawada	Yasuo Tomomichi	Tokyo Horse Racing	2:11.2
2022^{[a]}	Ask Wild More	Mirai Iwata	Hideaki Fujiwara	Toshihiro Hirosaki	2:09.5
2023	Satono Glanz	Yuga Kawada	Yasuo Tomomichi	Hajime Satomi	2:14.1
2024	June Take	Yusuke Fujioka	Hidenori Take	Jun Yoshikawa	2:11.2
2025	Shohei	Yuga Kawada	Yasuo Tomomichi	Tatsue Ishikawa	2:14.7
2026	Congestus	Atsuya Nishimura	Tomokazu Takano	Silk Racing	2:09.9

^{a} The 2021 and 2022 runnings took place at Chukyo while Kyoto was closed for redevelopment.

== Earlier winners ==
- 1953 - Daisan Hoshu
- 1954 - Minemasa
- 1955 - Yasaka
- 1956 - Yasaka
- 1957 - Yodo Sakura
- 1958 - Hoshi Sakura
- 1959 - Will Deal
- 1960 - Helios
- 1961 - Miss Keiko
- 1962 - Korehisa
- 1963 - Kouraio
- 1964 - Ballymoss Nisei
- 1965 - Keystone
- 1966 - Hard It
- 1967 - Sato Hikaru
- 1968 - Tanino Hello More
- 1969 - King Speed
- 1970 - Tamahope
- 1971 - Nihon Pillow Moutiers
- 1972 - Tai Tehm
- 1973 - Toyo Chikara
- 1974 - Kitano Kachidoki
- 1975 - Kokusai Prince
- 1976 - Tosho Boy
- 1977 - Press Toko
- 1978 - Mejiro Eagle
- 1979 - Fine Dragon
- 1980 - Over Rainbow
- 1981 - Sanei Tholon
- 1982 - Hagino Kamui O
- 1983 - Katsuragi Ace
- 1984 - Nishino Raiden
- 1985 - Miho Shinzan
- 1986 - Takeno Komayoshi
- 1987 - Leo Tenzan
- 1988 - Yaeno Muteki
- 1989 - Bamboo Begin
- 1990 - Mejiro Ryan
- 1991 - Nice Nature
- 1992 - Mihono Bourbon
- 1993 - Winning Ticket
- 1994 - Star Man
- 1995 - Narita King O
- 1996 - Dance In The Dark
- 1997 - Matikanefukukitaru
- 1998 - Special Week
- 1999 - Admire Vega

== See also ==
- Horse racing in Japan
- List of Japanese flat horse races
