= Dura Erede =

Japanese Thoroughbred racehorse (foaled 2020)

Dura Erede ドゥラエレーデ
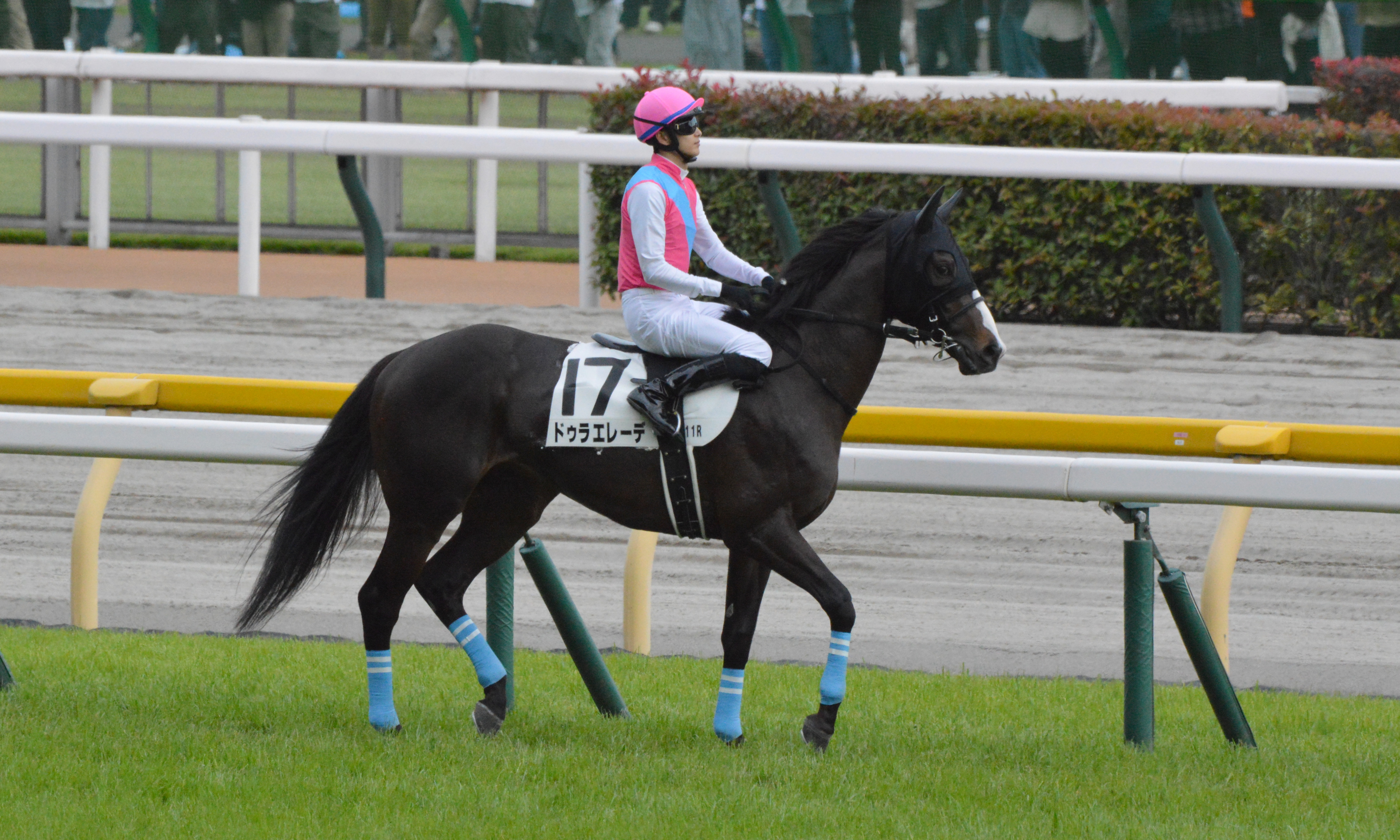
- Dura Erede at the 2023 Tokyo Yushun
- Breed: Thoroughbred
- Sire: Duramente
- Grandsire: King Kamehameha
- Dam: Marchesa
- Damsire: Orfevre
- Sex: Colt
- Foaled: 29 January 2020
- Country: Japan
- Colour: Dark bay
- Breeder: Northern Farm
- Owner: Three H Racing
- Racing colours
- Trainer: Manabu Ikezoe → Terunobu Fujita
- Jockey: Bauyrzhan Murzabayev
- Record: 27: 2-4-4 (19 JRA: 2-2-4; 5 NAR: 0-1-0; 3 overseas: 0-1-0)
- Earnings: ¥330,808,200

Major wins
- Hopeful Stakes (2022)

Dura Erede (Japanese: ドゥラエレーデ, Hepburn: Dura Erēde; foaled 29 January 2020) is a retired Japanese Thoroughbred racehorse and active stud. His career spanned from 2022 until 2026, recording two wins in twenty-six starts, including the Hopeful Stakes (GI) in 2022. His racing name combines "Dura" from his sire Duramente with "Erede," the Italian word for "heir" or "successor."

== Background ==
Dura Erede is a dark bay colt bred in Abira, Hokkaido, by Northern Farm. He was sired by Duramente, a son of King Kamehameha, and his dam was Marchesa, a daughter of Orfevre. His granddam Malpensa won three Group 1 races in Argentina, and his half-uncle Satono Diamond won the 2016 Kikuka Shō and Arima Kinen. He was purchased for ¥100,000,000 at the 2021 Select Sale yearling session. He was owned by Three H Racing and sent into training with Manabu Ikezoe at the JRA's Ritto Training Center. In January 2026, he was transferred to the stable of Terunobu Fujita at Oi Racecourse.

== Racing career ==
=== 2022: two-year-old season ===
Dura Erede debuted on June 26, 2022, in a maiden race on the turf at Hanshin Racecourse, finishing fifth. He finished second in a maiden race at Sapporo Racecourse in August and won a maiden race on the dirt at Sapporo on August 20. He finished fourth in the Tokyo Sports Hai Nisai Stakes (GII) at Tokyo Racecourse in November.

On December 28, he contested the Hopeful Stakes (GI) at Nakayama Racecourse. Ridden by Bauyrzhan Murzabayev, he was the 90.6-to-1 fourteenth favourite in a field of eighteen. He was positioned in second place behind the leader Top Knife and finished strongly to win by a nose in a photo finish. The victory was the first Grade 1 win for both Murzabayev and trainer Manabu Ikezoe.

=== 2023: three-year-old season ===
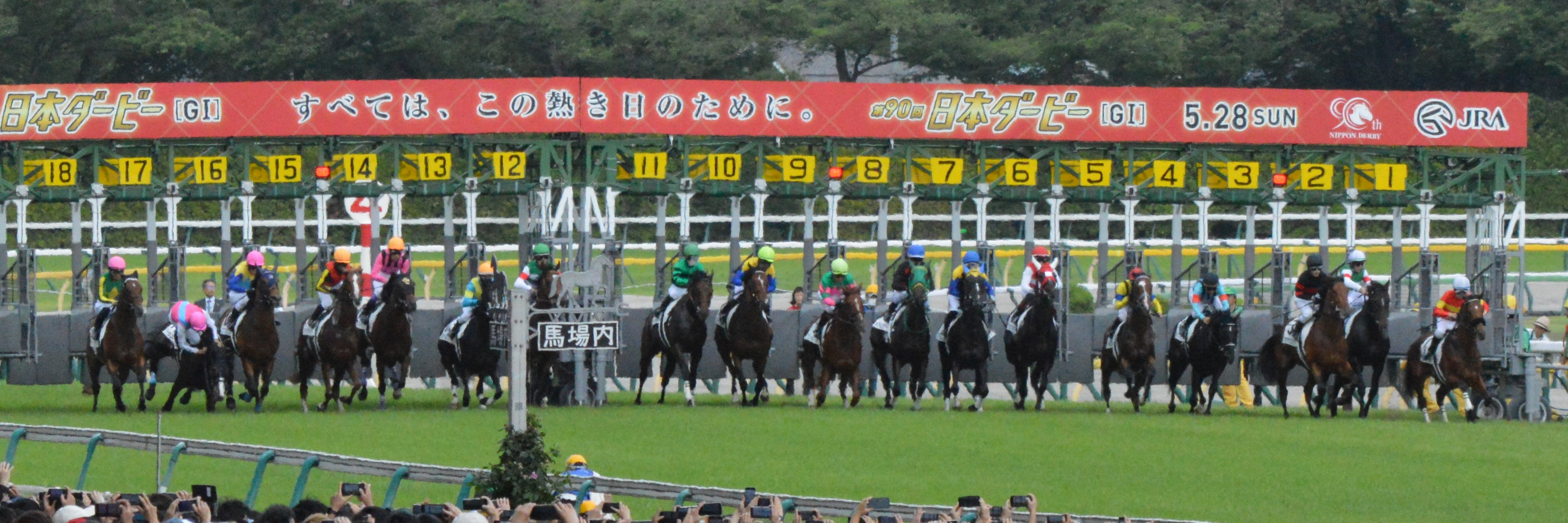
Dura Erede (2nd from left) unseating his jockey, Ryusei Sakai, at the 2023 Japanese Derby

Dura Erede finished second in the UAE Derby (G2) at Meydan Racecourse in March, beaten one length by Derma Sotogake. He was unseated at the start of the Tōkyō Yūshun (GI) at Tokyo in May and did not finish the race. He finished tenth in the Takarazuka Kinen (GI) at Hanshin in June and eighth in the St. Lite Kinen (GII) at Nakayama in September. He finished third in the Champions Cup (GI) at Chukyo Racecourse in December and third in the Tokyo Daishoten (GI) at Oi Racecourse in December.

=== 2024: four-year-old season ===
Dura Erede finished twelfth in the February Stakes (GI) at Tokyo in February and fifth in the Dubai World Cup (G1) at Meydan in March. He finished second in the Elm Stakes (GIII) at Sapporo in August and tenth in the Sapporo Kinen (GII) at Sapporo in August. He finished eleventh in the Miyako Stakes (GIII) at Kyoto Racecourse in November and third in the Champions Cup (GI) at Chukyo in December.

=== 2025: five-year-old season ===
Dura Erede finished third in the Procyon Stakes (GII) at Chukyo in January and eleventh in the February Stakes (GI) at Tokyo in February. He finished seventh in the Elm Stakes (GIII) at Sapporo in August, fifth in the Korea Cup (G3) at Seoul Racecourse in September, and fifth in the Miyako Stakes (GIII) at Kyoto in November. He finished fourteenth in the Naruo Kinen (GIII) at Hanshin in December. He was deregistered from JRA competition on December 11, 2025.

=== 2026: six-year-old season ===
Dura Erede was transferred to the NAR stable of Terunobu Fujita at Oi in January 2026. He finished second in the Kawasaki Kinen (JpnI) at Kawasaki Racecourse in April, thirteenth in the Oi Kinen (SI) at Oi in May, and fifth in the Mercury Cup (JpnIII) at Morioka Racecourse in July. His final start came at the Furioso Legend Cup in August, in which he finished in fourth place before he was sent to stud at East Stud in Urakawa, Hokkaido from 2027.

== Statistics ==
The following table details all 27 starts of Dura Erede's racing career based on official netkeiba, JBIS, and Emirates Racing Authority records. Record current as of 26 August 2026.

Date	Distance (Condition)	Race	Class	Course	Odds (Favourite)	Field	Finish	Time	Jockey	Winning (Losing) Margin	Winner (2nd Place)	Ref
2022 – two-year-old season
Jun 26	Turf 1800 m (Firm)	2-Y-O Newcomer	Maiden	Hanshin	2.0 (1st)	12	5th	1:50.9	Yuichi Kitamura	0.7	Carro Veloce	
Aug 6	Turf 1800 m (Firm)	2-Y-O Maiden	Maiden	Sapporo	2.5 (2nd)	10	2nd	1:49.4	Kazuo Yokoyama	0.3	Dura	
Aug 20	Dirt 1700 m (Good)	2-Y-O Maiden	Maiden	Sapporo	1.5 (1st)	12	1st	1:46.6	Kenichi Ikezoe	–0.1	(Shigeru Kamikaze)	
Nov 19	Turf 1800 m (Firm)	Tokyo Sports Hai Nisai Stakes	GII	Tokyo	20.1 (6th)	11	4th	1:46.0	Ryan Moore	0.2	Gastrique	
Dec 28	Turf 2000 m (Firm)	Hopeful Stakes	GI	Nakayama	90.6 (14th)	18	1st	2:01.5	Bauyrzhan Murzabayev	0.0	(Top Knife)	
2023 – three-year-old season
Mar 25	Dirt 1900 m (Fast)	UAE Derby	G2	Meydan	17.0 (7th)	13	2nd	1:56.81	Cristian Demuro	1.0	Derma Sotogake	
May 28	Turf 2400 m (Firm)	Tōkyō Yūshun	GI	Tokyo	44.3 (8th)	18	DNF	–	Ryusei Sakai	–	Tastiera	
Jun 25	Turf 2200 m (Firm)	Takarazuka Kinen	GI	Hanshin	30.2 (7th)	17	10th	2:12.3	Hideaki Miyuki	1.1	Equinox	
Sep 18	Turf 2200 m (Firm)	St. Lite Kinen	GII	Nakayama	15.3 (5th)	15	8th	2:12.5	Ryusei Sakai	1.1	Lebensstil	
Dec 3	Dirt 1800 m (Firm)	Champions Cup	GI	Chukyo	31.2 (9th)	15	3rd	1:50.9	Bauyrzhan Murzabayev	0.3	Lemon Pop	
Dec 29	Dirt 2000 m (Firm)	Tokyo Daishoten	GI	Oi	11.9 (4th)	9	3rd	2:07.9	Bauyrzhan Murzabayev	0.2	Ushba Tesoro	
2024 – four-year-old season
Feb 18	Dirt 1600 m (Firm)	February Stakes	GI	Tokyo	5.5 (3rd)	16	12th	1:36.8	Bauyrzhan Murzabayev	1.1	Peptide Nile	
Mar 30	Dirt 2000 m (Firm)	Dubai World Cup	G1	Meydan	–	12	5th	2:04.7	Bauyrzhan Murzabayev	2.4	Laurel River	
Aug 4	Dirt 1700 m (Good)	Elm Stakes	GIII	Sapporo	3.4 (1st)	14	2nd	1:44.1	Yutaka Take	0.1	Peisha Es	
Aug 18	Turf 2000 m (Firm)	Sapporo Kinen	GII	Sapporo	20.0 (6th)	12	10th	2:01.0	Yusuke Fujioka	1.4	North Bridge	
Nov 3	Dirt 1800 m (Heavy)	Miyako Stakes	GIII	Kyoto	6.1 (2nd)	15	11th	1:51.9	Yuichi Kitamura	2.2	Sunrise Zipangu	
Dec 1	Dirt 1800 m (Firm)	Champions Cup	GI	Chukyo	42.6 (9th)	16	3rd	1:50.4	Ryan Moore	0.3	Lemon Pop	
2025 – five-year-old season
Jan 26	Dirt 1800 m (Firm)	Procyon Stakes	GII	Chukyo	4.7 (3rd)	16	3rd	1:50.7	Yuga Kawada	0.1	Sunday Funday	
Feb 23	Dirt 1600 m (Firm)	February Stakes	GI	Tokyo	29.4 (7th)	16	11th	1:37.1	Kazuo Yokoyama	1.6	Costa Nova	
Aug 9	Dirt 1700 m (Good)	Elm Stakes	GIII	Sapporo	7.0 (2nd)	14	7th	1:44.7	Kohei Matsuyama	1.2	Perriere	
Sep 7	Dirt 1800 m (Firm)	Korea Cup	G3	Seoul	–	11	5th	1:53.0	Kohei Matsuyama	2.2	Diktaean	
Nov 9	Dirt 1800 m (Heavy)	Miyako Stakes	GIII	Kyoto	19.7 (8th)	15	5th	1:48.6	Cristian Demuro	1.1	W Heart Bond	
Dec 6	Turf 1800 m (Firm)	Naruo Kinen	GIII	Hanshin	24.2 (9th)	14	14th	1:45.8	Atsuya Nishimura	2.1	David Barows	
2026 – six-year-old season
Apr 8	Dirt 2100 m (Good)	Kawasaki Kinen	JpnI	Kawasaki	28.6 (8th)	11	2nd	2:15.0	Ryo Nohata	0.4	Kazeno Runner	
May 20	Dirt 2000 m (Firm)	Oi Kinen	SI	Oi	2.9 (1st)	16	13th	2:07.5	Ryo Nohata	3.2	Saint Honore	
Jul 20	Dirt 2000 m (Firm)	Mercury Cup	JpnIII	Morioka	9.3 (4th)	14	5th	2:03.6	Hiroto Yoshihara	1.3	Sunday Funday	
Aug 26	Dirt 1800 m (Firm)	Furioso Legend Cup	SIII	Funabashi	3.3 (2nd)	13	4th	1:53.9	Hiroto Yoshihara	0.6	Rebake Full City	

== Pedigree ==
Pedigree of Dura Erede (JPN)
Sire Duramente (JPN) 2012	King Kamehameha (JPN); 2001	Kingmambo	Mr. Prospector
Sire Duramente (JPN) 2012	King Kamehameha (JPN); 2001	Kingmambo	Miesque
Sire Duramente (JPN) 2012	King Kamehameha (JPN); 2001	Manfath	Last Tycoon
Sire Duramente (JPN) 2012	King Kamehameha (JPN); 2001	Manfath	Pilot Bird
Sire Duramente (JPN) 2012	Admire Groove (JPN); 2000	Sunday Silence	Halo
Sire Duramente (JPN) 2012	Admire Groove (JPN); 2000	Sunday Silence	Wishing Well
Sire Duramente (JPN) 2012	Admire Groove (JPN); 2000	Air Groove	Tony Bin
Sire Duramente (JPN) 2012	Admire Groove (JPN); 2000	Air Groove	Dyna Carle
Dam Marchesa (JPN) 2015	Orfevre (JPN); 2008	Stay Gold	Sunday Silence
Dam Marchesa (JPN) 2015	Orfevre (JPN); 2008	Stay Gold	Golden Sash
Dam Marchesa (JPN) 2015	Orfevre (JPN); 2008	Oriental Art	Mejiro McQueen
Dam Marchesa (JPN) 2015	Orfevre (JPN); 2008	Oriental Art	Electro Art
Dam Marchesa (JPN) 2015	Malpensa (ARG); 2006	Orpen	Lure
Dam Marchesa (JPN) 2015	Malpensa (ARG); 2006	Orpen	Bonita Francita
Dam Marchesa (JPN) 2015	Malpensa (ARG); 2006	Marsella	Southern Halo
Dam Marchesa (JPN) 2015	Malpensa (ARG); 2006	Marsella	Riviere

- Dura Erede is inbred 3 × 4 to Sunday Silence, 4 × 5 and 5 × 5 to Halo, and 5 × 5 to Northern Taste.
- His granddam, Malpensa, won three Group 1 races in Argentina.
- His half-uncle, Satono Diamond, (by Deep Impact) won the 2016 Kikuka Shō and Arima Kinen.
- His full sister, Maglia Iridata, won the 2026 Fukushima Kinen.

== See also ==
- Thoroughbred racing in Japan
- Hopeful Stakes
- Duramente
