= Don Frankie =

Japanese Thoroughbred racehorse (foaled 2019)

Don Frankie; ドンフランキー
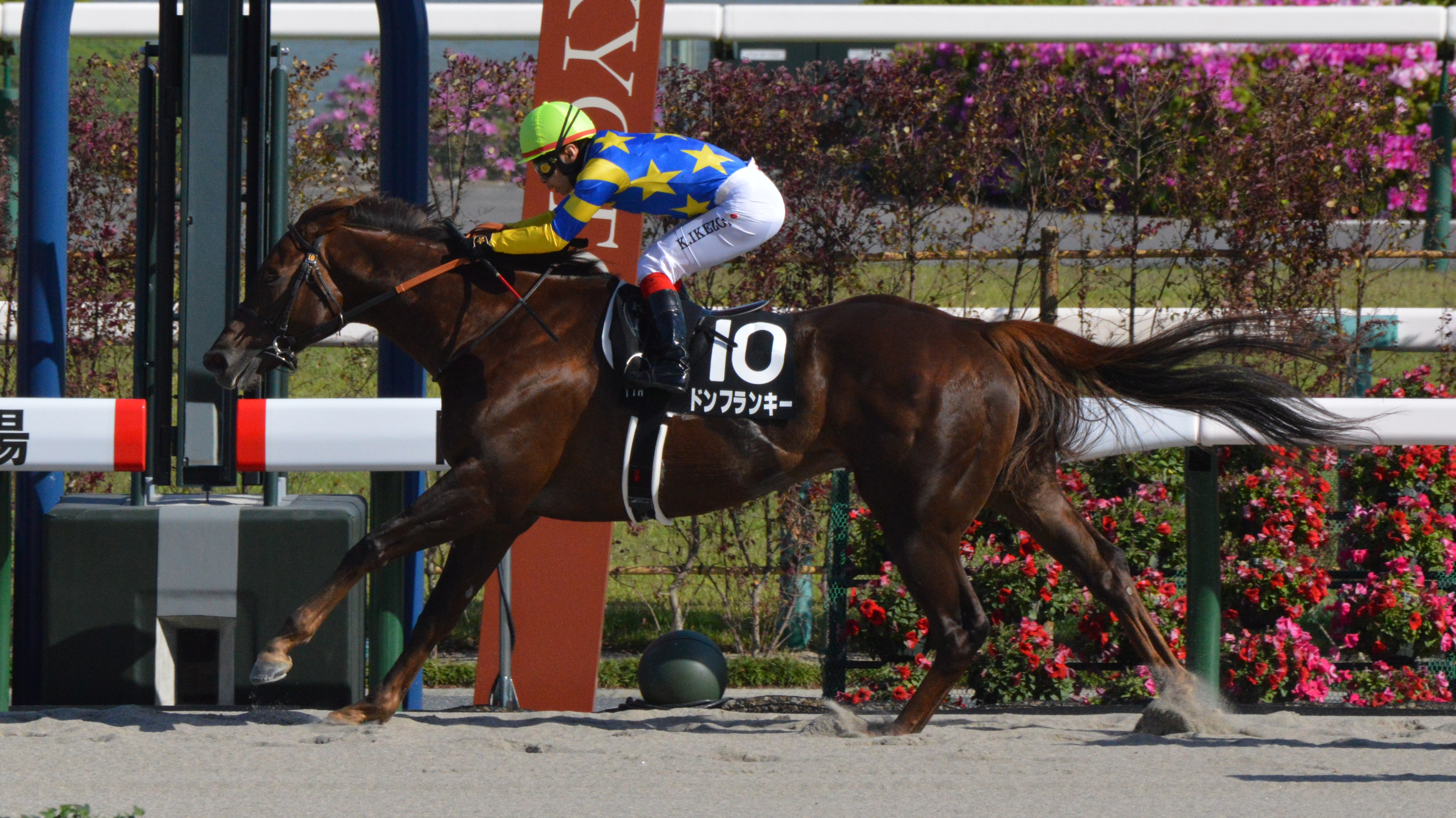
- Don Frankie at the 2023 Kyoto Racecourse Grand Open Memorial
- Breed: Thoroughbred
- Sire: Daiwa Major
- Grandsire: Sunday Silence
- Dam: Weemissfrankie
- Damsire: Sunriver
- Sex: Stallion
- Foaled: 15 February 2019 (age 7)
- Country: Japan
- Colour: Chestnut
- Breeder: Northern Farm
- Owner: Makoto Hayano
- Racing colours
- Trainer: Takashi Saito
- Jockey: Kenichi Ikezoe; Cristian Demuro; Mirai Iwata; Yuichi Fukunaga
- Record: 20: 8-3-1
- Earnings: ¥252,657,200

Major wins
- Procyon Stakes (2023); Tokyo Hai (2023); Cluster Cup (2024)

Don Frankie (Japanese: ドンフランキー, Don Furankī; foaled 15 February 2019) is a retired Japanese Thoroughbred racehorse and active sire. He recorded eight wins from twenty starts between 2021 and 2025, including the Procyon Stakes (GIII) and the Tokyo Hai (JpnII) in 2023, and the Cluster Cup (JpnIII) in 2024. He also finished second in the 2024 Dubai Golden Shaheen (G1). Weighing around 600 kilograms, he was nicknamed the "Super Heavy Tank" by the media, and set a JRA record for the heaviest horse to win a graded stakes race at 594 kilograms. His name combines "Don" (boss) with his dam's name.

== Background ==
Don Frankie is a chestnut stallion bred in Abira, Hokkaido, by Northern Farm. He was sired by Daiwa Major, and his dam was Weemissfrankie, a mare by Sunriver who won the Del Mar Debutante Stakes and the Oak Leaf Stakes (both G1) in the United States. He was purchased for 73,440,000 yen by Makoto Hayano at the Select Sale and trained by Takashi Saito at the JRA's Ritto Training Center.

== Racing career ==
=== 2021: two-year-old season ===
Don Frankie debuted on 26 June 2021 in a 2-year-old newcomer race over 1400 metres on turf at Hanshin Racecourse, finishing second behind Tagano Finale. He finished fifth in a maiden race at Niigata Racecourse in July. Switching to dirt in December, he won his maiden race at Hanshin, leading from the start and winning by 0.6 seconds with Cristian Demuro.

=== 2022: three-year-old season ===
He began the year with a seventh-place finish in a 1-win class race at Chukyo Racecourse, then won his next start over 1400 metres on dirt at Hanshin in March. On 16 April, he made his graded stakes debut in the Arlington Cup (GIII) on turf, finishing 12th behind Danon Scorpion. Returning to dirt, he won a 2-win class race at Chukyo in September by 0.9 seconds, and finished second in the Himeji Stakes at Hanshin in November.

=== 2023: four-year-old season ===
Don Frankie won the Totomi Stakes (3-win class) at Chukyo in January, entering the open class. He then finished fourth in the Coral Stakes (Listed) and won the Commemorative Race Of The Kyoto Racecourse Grand Open (Open) in April. On 9 July, he contested the Procyon Stakes (GIII) at Chukyo. Ridden by Kenichi Ikezoe, he led the race and held off the late challenge of Remake by a neck, recording his first graded stakes victory. His winning weight of 594 kilograms broke the JRA record for the heaviest horse to win a graded stakes race.

On 15 August, he finished second to Remake in the Cluster Cup (JpnIII) at Morioka Racecourse. On 4 October, he ran in the Tokyo Hai (JpnII) at Oi Racecourse. He won the three-way battle in the straight and set a course record time of 1:10.0, securing his second graded stakes victory. He was subsequently diagnosed with a fracture in his left radius and was sidelined for more than three months.

=== 2024: five-year-old season ===
He returned on 18 February in the February Stakes (GI) at Tokyo Racecourse, finishing ninth behind Peptide Nile. On 30 March, he contested the Dubai Golden Shaheen (G1) at Meydan Racecourse. Ridden by Cristian Demuro, he led the race but was passed on the inside in the straight, finishing second. On 14 August, he won the Cluster Cup (JpnIII) at Morioka, leading from the start and recording a winning weight of 607 kilograms. On 2 November, he ran in the Breeders' Cup Sprint (G1) at Del Mar Racetrack in the United States, finishing ninth behind Straight No Chaser.

=== 2025: six-year-old season ===
Don Frankie began the year on 2 February in the Negishi Stakes (GIII) at Tokyo, finishing 13th behind Costa Nova. On 3 November, he ran in the JBC Sprint (JpnI) at Funabashi Racecourse, finishing 10th behind Fern Hill. His retirement was announced by trainer Takashi Saito on 4 November, and his JRA registration was cancelled on 6 November 2025. He entered Yushun Stallion Station in Niikappu, Hokkaido, as a stallion.

== Race record ==
The following table details all 20 starts of Don Frankie's racing career based on official JBIS and netkeiba records. Record current as of his final start on 3 November 2025.

| Date | Distance (Condition) | Race | Class | Course | Odds (Favourite) | Field | Finish | Time | Jockey | Winning (Losing) Margin | Winner (2nd Place) | Ref |
|---|---|---|---|---|---|---|---|---|---|---|---|---|
2021 – two-year-old season
| Jun 26 | Turf 1400 m (Good) | 2-Y-O Newcomer | Maiden | Hanshin | 24.0 (6th) | 17 | 2nd | 1:24.4 | Mirai Iwata | 0.2 | Tagano Finale | |
| Jul 24 | Turf 1400 m (Good) | 2-Y-O Maiden | Maiden | Niigata | 2.8 (1st) | 15 | 5th | 1:21.1 | Mirai Iwata | 0.3 | Jazz Blues | |
| Dec 18 | Dirt 1400 m (Heavy) | 2-Y-O Maiden | Maiden | Hanshin | 2.4 (1st) | 16 | 1st | 1:23.3 | Cristian Demuro | –0.6 | (Meisho Kid) | |
2022 – three-year-old season
| Jan 8 | Dirt 1800 m (Good) | 3-Y-O 1-win | 1-win | Chukyo | 9.6 (4th) | 14 | 7th | 1:53.9 | Cristian Demuro | 1.0 | Desierto | |
| Mar 13 | Dirt 1400 m (Good) | 3-Y-O 1-win | 1-win | Hanshin | 2.5 (1st) | 13 | 1st | 1:24.6 | Kenichi Ikezoe | –0.5 | (T O Stealth) | |
| Apr 16 | Turf 1400 m (Good) | Arlington Cup | GIII | Hanshin | 18.5 (6th) | 18 | 12th | 1:33.7 | Kenichi Ikezoe | 1.0 | Danon Scorpion | |
| Sep 18 | Dirt 1400 m (Good) | 3-Y-O+ 2-win | 2-win | Chukyo | 2.5 (1st) | 16 | 1st | 1:22.8 | Kenichi Ikezoe | –0.9 | (Kitano Express) | |
| Nov 20 | Dirt 1400 m (Yielding) | Himeji Stakes | 3-win | Hanshin | 1.8 (1st) | 14 | 2nd | 1:23.9 | Kenichi Ikezoe | 0.0 | Kaseno Dancer | |
2023 – four-year-old season
| Jan 14 | Dirt 1400 m (Heavy) | Totomi Stakes | 3-win | Chukyo | 1.8 (1st) | 16 | 1st | 1:23.0 | Yuichi Fukunaga | –0.4 | (Leonore) | |
| Mar 11 | Dirt 1400 m (Good) | Coral Stakes | Listed | Hanshin | 2.3 (1st) | 16 | 4th | 1:24.1 | Kenichi Ikezoe | 0.1 | Tagano Beauty | |
| Apr 22 | Dirt 1200 m (Good) | Commemorative Race Of The Kyoto Racecourse Grand Open | Open | Kyoto | 2.7 (2nd) | 16 | 1st | 1:10.8 | Kenichi Ikezoe | –0.3 | (Cyclotron) | |
| Jul 9 | Dirt 1400 m (Yielding) | Procyon Stakes | GIII | Chukyo | 4.8 (2nd) | 15 | 1st | 1:23.0 | Kenichi Ikezoe | –0.1 | (Remake) | |
| Aug 15 | Dirt 1200 m (Heavy) | Cluster Cup | JpnIII | Morioka | 3.1 (2nd) | 14 | 2nd | 1:09.0 | Kenichi Ikezoe | 0.4 | Remake | |
| Oct 4 | Dirt 1200 m (Heavy) | Tokyo Hai | JpnII | Oi | 1.4 (1st) | 13 | 1st | R1:10.0 | Kenichi Ikezoe | –0.2 | (Ryuno Yukina) | |
2024 – five-year-old season
| Feb 18 | Dirt 1600 m (Good) | February Stakes | GI | Tokyo | 36.0 (10th) | 16 | 9th | 1:36.6 | Kenichi Ikezoe | 1.0 | Peptide Nile | |
| Mar 30 | Dirt 1200 m (Good) | Dubai Golden Shaheen | G1 | Meydan | 10.0 (5th) | 14 | 2nd | 1:11.2 | Cristian Demuro | 1.0 | Tuz | |
| Aug 14 | Dirt 1200 m (Good) | Cluster Cup | JpnIII | Morioka | 1.8 (1st) | 13 | 1st | 1:10.0 | Kenichi Ikezoe | –0.1 | (Kurojishi Joe) | |
| Nov 2 | Dirt 1200 m (Good) | Breeders' Cup Sprint | G1 | Del Mar | (7th) | 11 | 9th | – | Cristian Demuro | – | Straight No Chaser | |
2025 – six-year-old season
| Feb 2 | Dirt 1400 m (Yielding) | Negishi Stakes | GIII | Tokyo | 9.1 (5th) | 16 | 13th | 1:25.2 | Kenichi Ikezoe | 1.4 | Costa Nova | |
| Nov 3 | Dirt 1000 m (Yielding) | JBC Sprint | JpnI | Funabashi | 5.0 (2nd) | 14 | 10th | 1:00.0 | Kenichi Ikezoe | 1.2 | Fern Hill | |

- R indicated that it was a record time finish

== Stud career ==
Don Frankie retired to Yushun Stallion Station in Niikappu, Hokkaido, where he began his stud career in 2026.

== Pedigree ==
Pedigree of Don Frankie (JPN)
| Sire Daiwa Major (JPN) 2001 | Sunday Silence (USA); 1986 | Halo | Hail to Reason |
| Sire Daiwa Major (JPN) 2001 | Sunday Silence (USA); 1986 | Halo | Cosmah |
| Sire Daiwa Major (JPN) 2001 | Sunday Silence (USA); 1986 | Wishing Well | Understanding |
| Sire Daiwa Major (JPN) 2001 | Sunday Silence (USA); 1986 | Wishing Well | Mountain Flower |
| Sire Daiwa Major (JPN) 2001 | Scarlet Bouquet (JPN); 1988 | Northern Taste | Northern Dancer |
| Sire Daiwa Major (JPN) 2001 | Scarlet Bouquet (JPN); 1988 | Northern Taste | Lady Victoria |
| Sire Daiwa Major (JPN) 2001 | Scarlet Bouquet (JPN); 1988 | Scarlet Ink | Crimson Satan |
| Sire Daiwa Major (JPN) 2001 | Scarlet Bouquet (JPN); 1988 | Scarlet Ink | Consentida |
| Dam Weemissfrankie (USA) 2009 | Sunriver (USA); 2003 | Saint Ballado | Halo |
| Dam Weemissfrankie (USA) 2009 | Sunriver (USA); 2003 | Saint Ballado | Ballade |
| Dam Weemissfrankie (USA) 2009 | Sunriver (USA); 2003 | Goulash | Mari's Book |
| Dam Weemissfrankie (USA) 2009 | Sunriver (USA); 2003 | Goulash | Wise Bride |
| Dam Weemissfrankie (USA) 2009 | Starinthemeadow (USA); 2000 | Meadowlake | Hold Your Peace |
| Dam Weemissfrankie (USA) 2009 | Starinthemeadow (USA); 2000 | Meadowlake | Suspicious Native |
| Dam Weemissfrankie (USA) 2009 | Starinthemeadow (USA); 2000 | Lite a Star | Our Michael |
| Dam Weemissfrankie (USA) 2009 | Starinthemeadow (USA); 2000 | Lite a Star | Twist a Star |

- Don Frankie is inbred 3 × 4 to Halo and 4 × 5 to Northern Dancer.
- His dam Weemissfrankie won the 2011 Del Mar Debutante Stakes and Oak Leaf Stakes (both G1).

== See also ==
- Thoroughbred racing in Japan
