= Rachel King =

British jockey (born 1990)

- Rachel King in 2026 (Freesia Sho, Tokyo Racecourse)

Personal information
- Nationality: British
- Born: 31 July 1990 (age 36) Waterperry, South Oxfordshire, England
- Occupation: Jockey
- Height: 155 cm (5 ft 1 in)
- Weight: 50 kg (110 lb)

Horse racing career
- Sport: Horse racing

Rachel King (born 31 July 1990) is a Group 1 winning British jockey based in Australia.

== Background ==
King was born in Waterperry near Oxford. Her father, Chris, was a fishmonger and amateur jockey and trainer who rode in point-to-points. While at school, she had a holiday job in the yard of trainer Mick Channon.

== Jockey career ==
After leaving school, she worked in the yard of dual-purpose trainer Alan King, where she had a few rides as an amateur jockey on the flat and over hurdles. Her first win was in a point-to-point on Lady De Paris in 2007 at Tweseldown Racecourse. After a brief apprenticeship to Mark Usher, she returned to amateur riding, spending three years as secretary and work rider to Clive Cox in Lambourn and winning a few races.

In 2014, King went to Sydney, Australia, for a working holiday. After spending two months at the yard of James and Bart Cummings, she decided to stay in Australia and became an apprentice for trainer Gai Waterhouse, riding her first winner in 2015 and claimed the 2016/17 Sydney Champion Apprentice title with 88 wins.

King's first Group race success came in March 2018, when Lanciato, trained by Mark Newnham, won the Group 3 Newcastle Newmarket Handicap. This was followed in October 2018 by her first Group 1 win, riding Maid Of Heaven for Newnham in the Spring Champion Stakes.

King was invited to Japan in August 2023 to represent Australia in the annual World All-star Jockeys Championship. She finished in second place, one point behind Japanese jockey Mirai Iwata. On 4 November 2023, she secured her fifth Group 1 win, riding Ozzmosis for Bjorn Baker in the Coolmore Stud Stakes at Flemington Racecourse, Melbourne.

King returned to Japan in January 2024 for two months after being granted a short-term license, sponsored by trainer Noriyuki Hori. On 21 January, King won the Grade 2 American Jockey Club Cup on Chuck Nate for Hori, making her the first foreign female jockey to win a graded flat race in Japan. (Note: The first foreign female jockey to win a graded race in Japan was Rochelle Lockett who won the Group 1 Nakayama Daishogai over fences with Gilded Age in 2002.) She went on to win the Grade 3 Tokyo Shimbun Hai on Sakura Toujours for Hori. In all, she won 16 races in Japan as of May 2024. King rode again in Japan in 2025 and became the first female jockey to win a Grade 1 flat race in Japan when she won the February Stakes on Costa Nova, trained by Tetsuya Kimura.

In 2026, King became the first female jockey to win the Golden Rose Stakes.

== Major wins ==
Australia

- Coolmore Stud Stakes – Ozzmosis (2023)
- Sydney Cup – Knights Order (2022) Arapaho (2025)
- Spring Champion Stakes – Maid of Heaven (2018)
- H E Tancred Stakes – Arapaho (2023)
- The Metropolitan – Just Fine (2023)
- Australian Derby - Green Spaces (2026)
- Golden Rose Stakes - Warwoven (2026)
- Caulfield Guineas - Warwoven (2026)

Japan

- February Stakes – Costa Nova (2025)
