= Manabu Ikezoe =

Japanese horse trainer (born 1980)

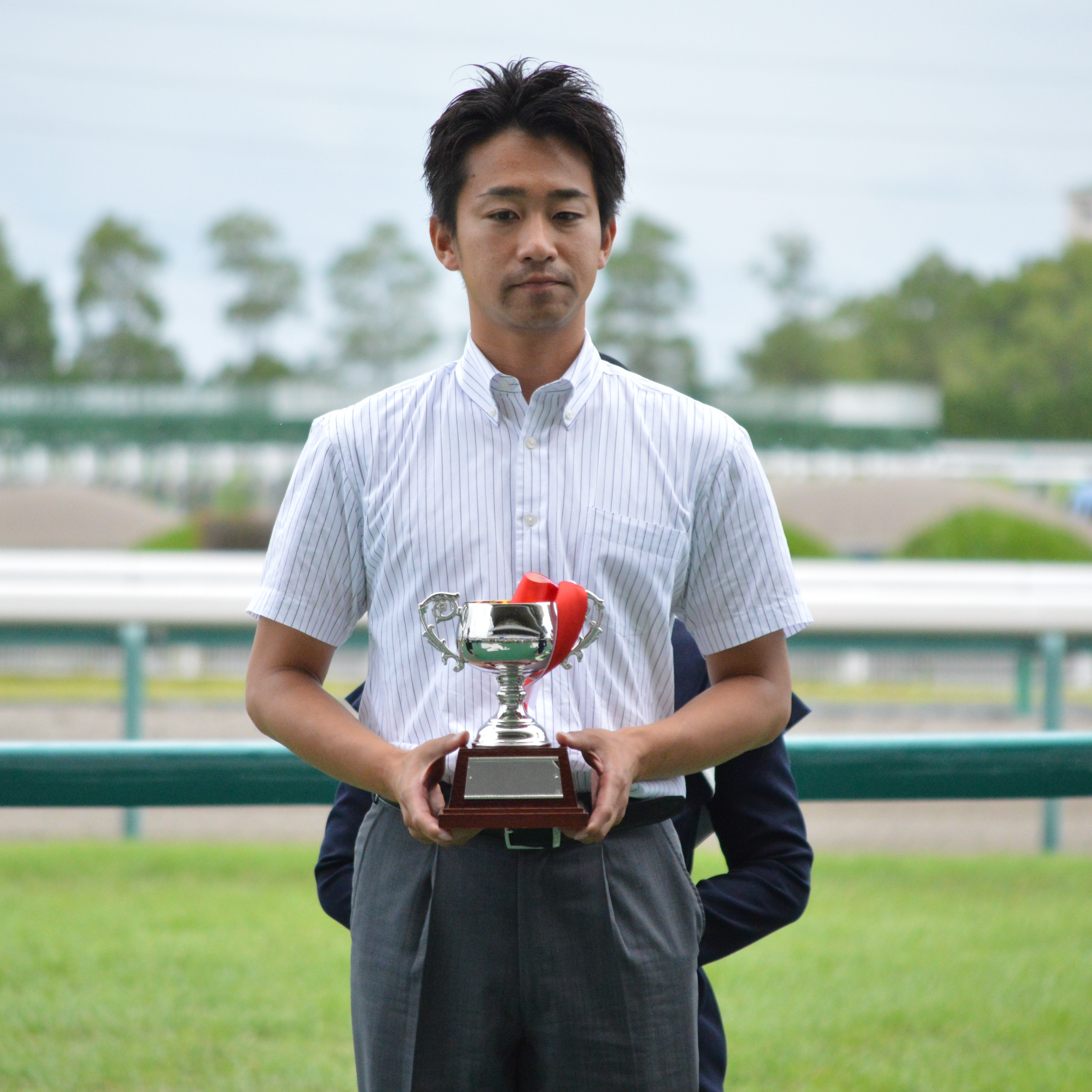

Personal information
- Native name: 池添 学
- Nationality: Japanese
- Born: September 2, 1980 (age 45) Rittō, Shiga Prefecture, Japan
- Education: Meiji University
- Occupation: Trainer

Horse racing career
- Sport: Horse racing
- Career wins: 323 (ongoing)

Major racing wins
- Hopeful Stakes, Takamatsunomiya Kinen

Significant horses
- Dura Erede (2022 Hopeful Stakes); Mad Cool (2024 Takamatsunomiya Kinen)

Manabu Ikezoe (Japanese: 池添 学一, born September 2, 1980) is a Japanese horse trainer affiliated with the Ritto Training Center of the Japan Racing Association, and the younger brother of jockey Kenichi Ikezoe.

== Early life ==
Ikezoe was born and raised in Rittō, Shiga Prefecture and had his passion on horse racing since his childhood years. While he initially wanted to become a jockey, he had to give up his dreams as he grew too tall to be one. Later on, Ikezoe began to aspire to become a trainer at the advice his father Kaneo, who at the time was a training assistant at Akio Tsurudome's stable and was also studying to become a trainer himself. He studied equestrianism in elementary school, and later Ritto High School, and won in the equestrian event of the 1997 National Sports Festival of Japan. He later stood at the pinnacle of student equestrianism and served as the captain of the equestrian club at Meiji University.

After graduating from Meiji, Ikezoe began working at the Northern Farm in Hokkaido and later moved to Ireland to work at Aidan O'Brien's stable, located at the Ballydoyle near Rosegreen. After returning to Japan, Ikezoe went to Horse Racing School and became a stable attendant at his father's stable in 2006 before becoming a training assistant a few years later. Ikezoe would later pass the trainer exam on a fourth attempt in 2013.

== Career ==
Ikezoe made his horse racing debut on March 7, 2015, with Cassino Runaway finishing 9th place. It was not until the following day on March 8, 2015, that Ikezoe won his first race with Melagrana at a maiden race held at the Hanshin Racecourse. From his start in 2015 and continuing into 2026, Ikezoe secured a total of 323 wins from 2,882 starts, with a career win rate of 11%, including 14 major prize winners and two G1 Class wins. Ikezoe received his first grade race win in the 2017 Ocean Stakes with Melagrana on March 4, 2017, and his first G1 Class win in the 2022 Hopeful Stakes with Dura Erede on December 28, 2022.

Ikezoe made his first Louisville debut in the 2026 Kentucky Derby on May 2, 2026, with Danon Bourbon, a Kentucky-bred Thoroughbred horse born in Versailles, Kentucky, whose racing career began with a win at Kyoto Racecourse in October 2025, received his first major win at the 2026 Fukuryu Stakes. Despite Ikezoe and Bourbon having a good lead throughout most of the race, he fell completely towards the end to 5th place.

== Major wins ==
Japan

- 2022 Hopeful Stakes - Dura Erede
- 2024 Takamatsunomiya Kinen - Mad Cool
