= Katsumi Yoshida =

Japanese businessman and racehorse owner

- 吉田勝己
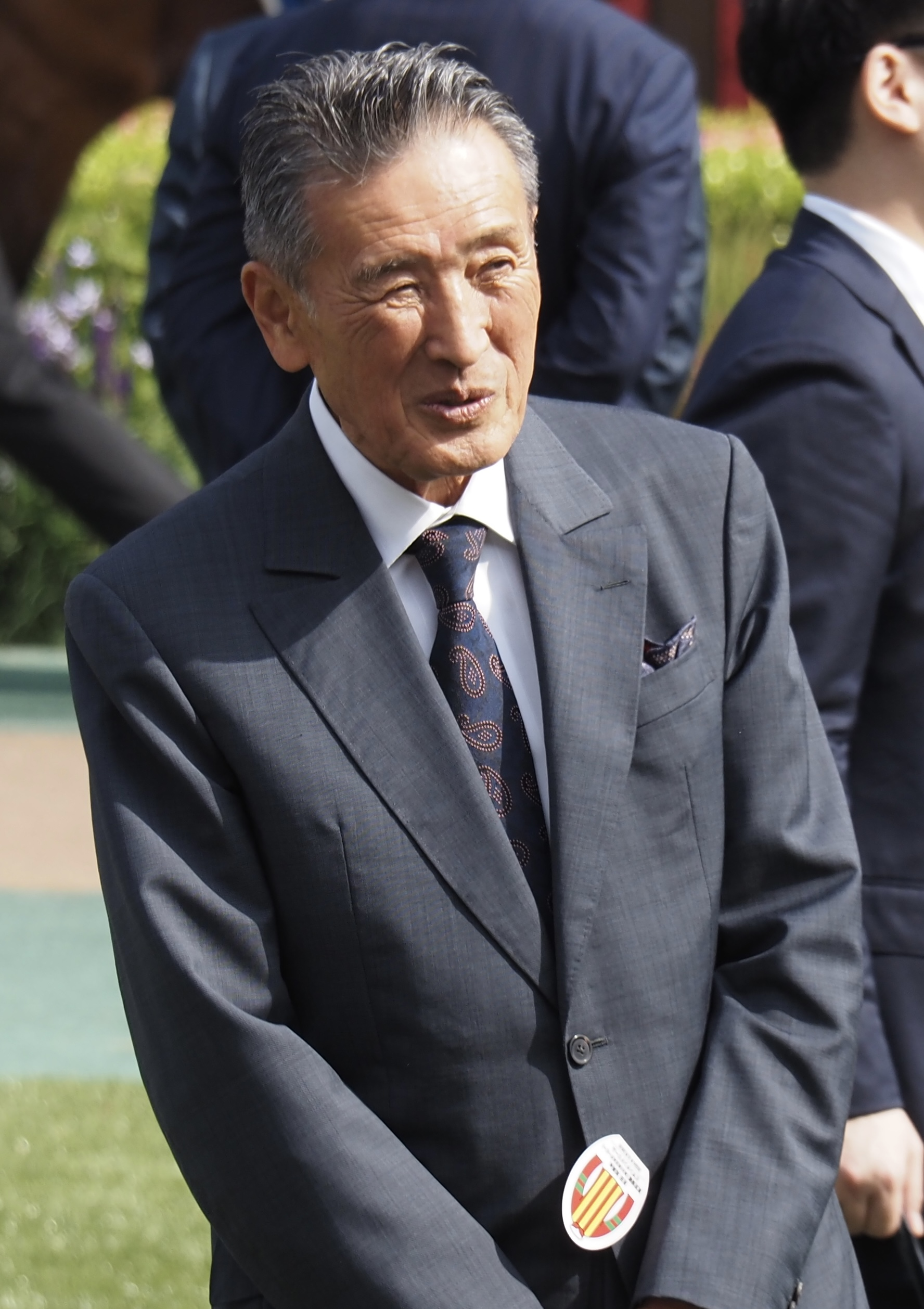
- Yoshida at the parade ring of the 2024 Tokyo Yushun
- Born: November 23, 1948 (age 77); Chiba Prefecture, Japan
- Known for: Business magnate, racehorse owner
- Spouse: Kazumi Yoshida

Katsumi Yoshida (吉田勝己) is a Japanese businessman and racehorse owner.

== History ==
He is a member of the influential Yoshida family in Japanese horse racing, with his father being Zenya Yoshida, a key figure in Japan's breeding industry.

== Notable Racehorses ==
- Costa Nova - Winner of the 2025 and 2026 February Stakes.
- Dance Partner - Winner of the 1995 Yushun Himba and the 1996 Queen Elizabeth II Cup
- Flower Park - Winner of the 1996 Takamatsunomiya Hai and Sprinters Stakes
- Gold Dream - Winner of the 2017 February Stakes and Champions Cup, 2018 and 2019 Kashiwa Kinen, and 2018 Teio Sho
- Rodeo Drive - Winner of the 2026 NHK Mile Cup
- Star Anise - Winner of the 2025 Hanshin Juvenile Fillies, and 2026 Oka Sho
- Stellenbosch - Winner of the 2024 Oka Sho
