= Star Anise (horse) =

Japanese Thoroughbred racehorse

Star Anise スターアニス
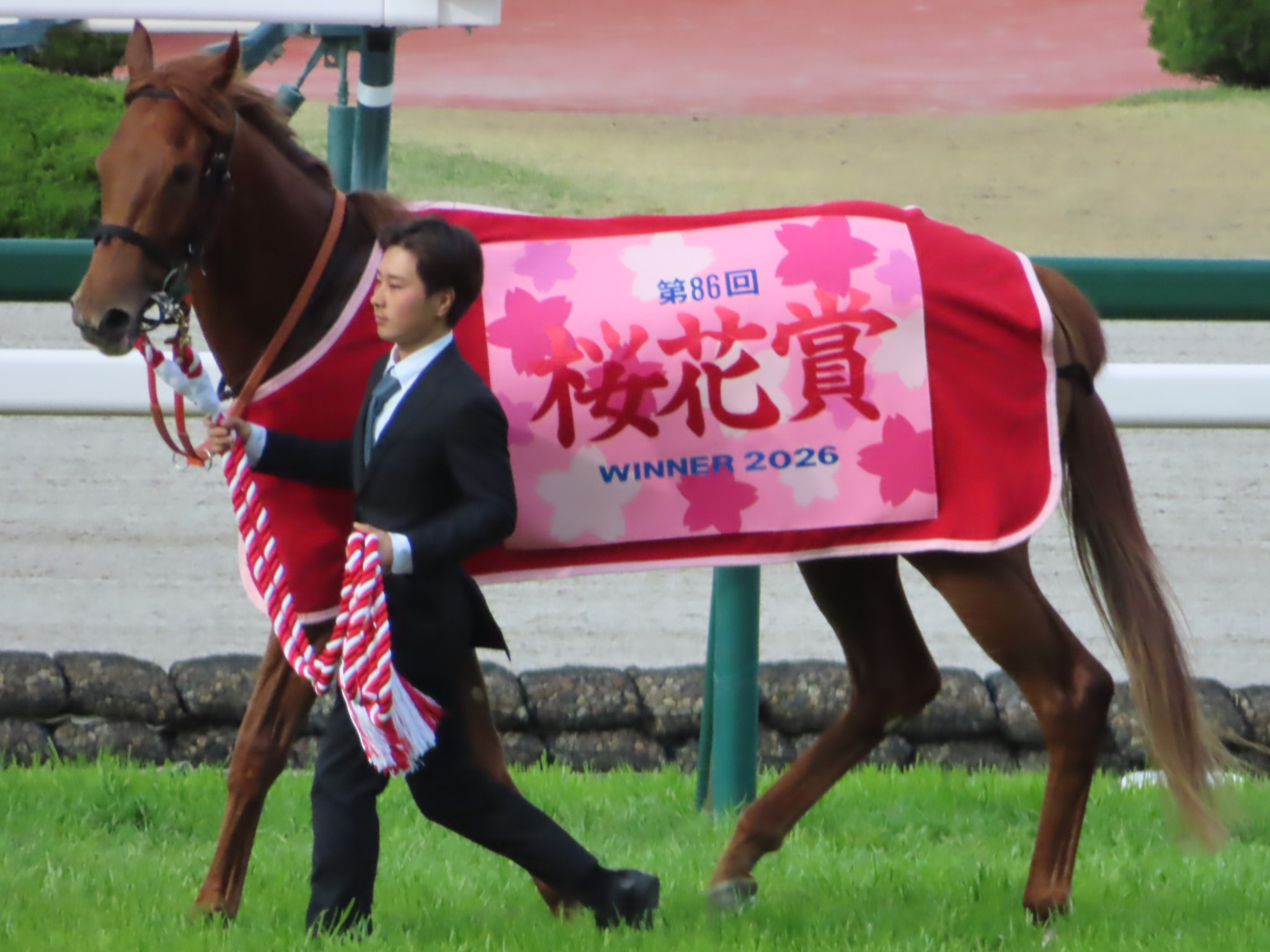
- Star Anise after winning the Oka Sho
- Sire: Drefong
- Grandsire: Gio Ponti
- Dam: Epice Arome
- Damsire: Daiwa Major
- Sex: Filly
- Foaled: 4 February 2023 (age 3)
- Country: Japan
- Colour: Chestnut
- Breeder: Northern Farm
- Owner: Katsumi Yoshida
- Racing colours
- Trainer: Tomokazu Takano
- Jockey: Kohei Matsuyama
- Record: 8 : 3-1-1
- Earnings: ¥324,573,000

Major wins
- Hanshin Juvenile Fillies (2025); Japanese Classic Tiara Race wins: Oka Sho (2026)

Honours
- JRA Award for Best Two-Year-Old Filly (2025)
- Last updated on November 22, 2026

Star Anise (Japanese: スターアニス foaled 4 February 2023) is an active Japanese filly thoroughbred racehorse. She was awarded the JRA Award for Best Two-Year-Old Filly in 2025.

She is named after the spice of the same name.

== Background ==
Star Anise was bred in Japan by Northern Farm. She is foaled by Epice Arome, a daughter of the 2004 Satsuki Shō winner Daiwa Major who won the Kokura Nisai Stakes in 2011 and the 2012 Centaur Stakes. Her sire Drefong won the 2016 Breeders' Cup Sprint.

She is owned by Katsumi Yoshida and trained by Tomokazu Takano.

== Racing Career ==
=== 2025: Two-year-old season ===
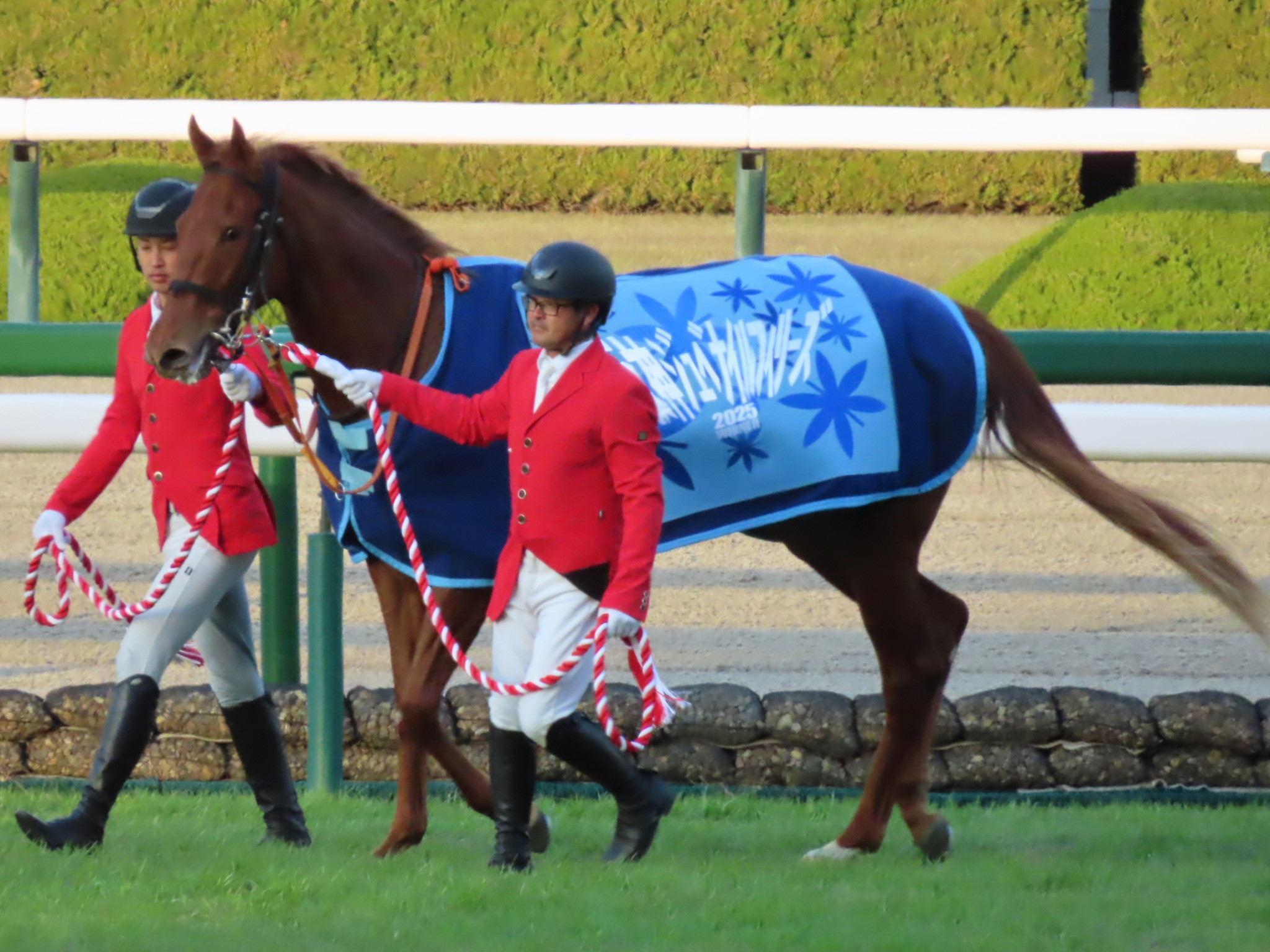
Star Anise after winning the Hanshin Juvenile Fillies

Jockeyed by Kohei Matsuyama, she made her debut in a race for 2-year-olds on 29 June held at Kokura Racecourse. She ran in the rear of the pack for most of the race before trying to push up in the home stretch, but finished fifth. She then won her next race, a maiden race held at Kokura Racecourse on 12 July, where she quickly overtook the likes of Tamamo Icarus and Diamond Knot and won by 7 lengths.

On 31 August, she ran in her first graded race, the Chukyo Nisai Stakes at Chukyo racecourse, where she entered the race as the favourite but finished 2nd behind Candide after Candide passed her just before the wire.

She raced her final race in 2025, the Grade I Hanshin Juvenile Fillies for two year old fillies. During the race the horse showed signs of being rushed early on, but Matsuyama managed to calm her down before placing themselves in the middle of the pack. On the final stretch, Star Anise surged forward and took the lead, winning her first graded race.

Having won 2 races, most notably the Hanshin Juvenile Fillies, Star Anise was named the Best Two-Year-Old Filly in the 2025 JRA Award.

=== 2026: Three-year-old season ===
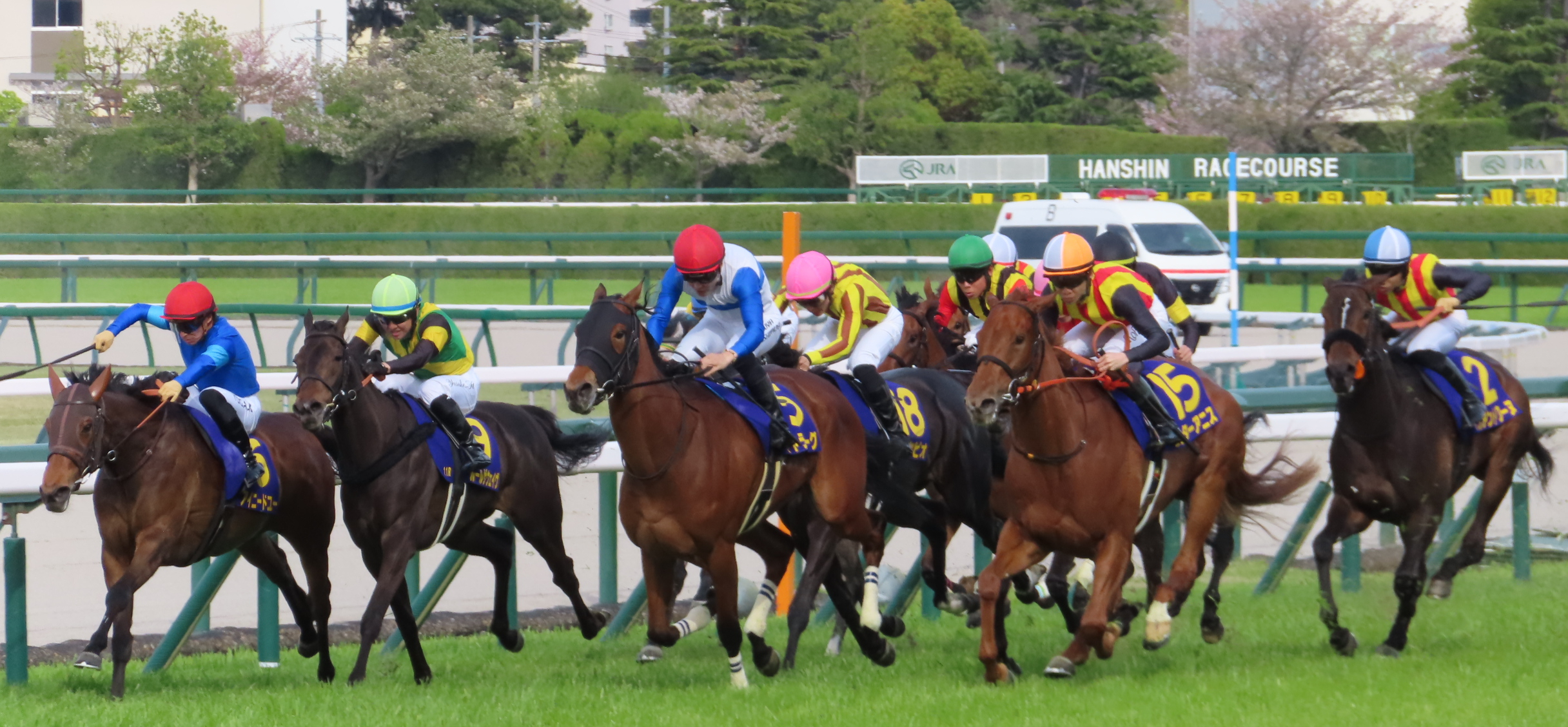
Star Anise (horse number #15) on the final stretch of the Oka Sho

Star Anise started her classic season by heading straight to the Oka Sho (Japanese 1,000 Guineas). She was the favourite to win the race. After leaving the gate, she was placed in middle pack until the last corner, and on the home straight she found a clear opening and made her move to overtake the pack, winning her second Grade I race and the first leg of the Japanese Triple Tiara. This was the second Oka Sho win for jockey Kohei Matsuyama, the first being his ride on Daring Tact in 2020, who said after the race, "I'm absolutely thrilled. It was a very competitive field, but as the champion two-year-old, I knew she couldn't lose. I went into the race determined to win, and right now, I just feel relieved."

On 15 April, Star Anise's owner announced that she will aim for the Yushun Himba (Japanese Oaks), the second leg of the Japanese Triple Tiara. In spite of concerns over whether she can make the distance, owing to how both her sire and dam were winners of sprint graded races, she was nonetheless the most favored to win. During the Yushun Himba, she ran among the pack for the majority of the race, but she was unable to take the lead and finished at 12th place. Trainer Takano reflected that "it was a pace she's never experienced before. The jockey tried to relax her, but she was far too rushed to do anything about it".

She was rested for the whole summer and it was decided that she would return to racing in the Sprinters Stakes in the end of September. On 30th of August, it was decided that she would be assigned to Christophe Lemaire as her normal jockey, Kohei Matsuyama opted to ride on Panja Tower. One week before race day, Takano claimed that she gained some power and improved her movement during the workouts. When the race began, she broke out of the gate smoothly, moved outward, and ran in tenth at the back. She met traffic at the top lane but successfully found a gap 200 meters out and displayed a powerful turn of foot, recording the second fastest closing speed to close in on the top three, but finished one and a quarter lengths behind in fourth. Lemaire realised that the track conditions become a hindrance for the horse as she did not turn well on the third and fourth corner but acknowledged that she recovered well in the end.

== Racing statistics ==
The following racing form is based on information available on netkeiba.com and JBIS-Search.

Date	Track	Race	Grade	Distance	Entry	Odds (Favored)	Finish	Time	Jockey	Winner (Runner-up)
2025 – two-year-old season
29 June	Kokura	2-yo debut		1.200 meters	10	5.7 (3rd)	5th	1:10.2	Kohei Matsuyama	Coral Reef
12 July	Kokura	2-yo maiden		1.200 meters	10	6.2 (4th)	1st	1:08.0	Kohei Matsuyama	(Tamamo Icarus)
31 Aug	Chukyo	Chukyo Nisai Stakes	G3	1.400 meters	13	1.7 (1st)	2nd	1:19.4	Kohei Matsuyama	Candide
29 June	Hanshin	Hanshin Juvenile Fillies	G1	1.600 meters	18	5.0 (2nd)	1st	1:32.6	Kohei Matsuyama	(Garavogue)
2026 – three-year-old season
12 Apr	Hanshin	Oka Sho	G1	1.600 meters	18	2.9 (1st)	1st	1:31.5	Kohei Matsuyama	(Garavogue)
24 May	Tokyo	Yushun Himba	G1	2.400 meters	18	3.0 (1st)	12th	2:26.4	Kohei Matsuyama	Juryoku Pierrot
27 Sep	Nakayama	Sprinters Stakes	G1	1.200 meters	16	3.7 (1st)	4th	1:09.4	Christophe Lemaire	Puro Magic
22 Nov	Kyoto	Mile Championship	G1	1,600 meters	18	4.2 (1st)	3rd	1:31.9	Kohei Matsuyama	Erdenali

== Pedigree ==
Pedigree of Star Anise (JPN), chestnut filly, 2023
Sire Drefong (USA) 2013	Gio Ponti (USA); 2005	Tale of the Cat (USA)	Storm Cat (USA)
Sire Drefong (USA) 2013	Gio Ponti (USA); 2005	Tale of the Cat (USA)	Yam (USA)
Sire Drefong (USA) 2013	Gio Ponti (USA); 2005	Cipeta Springs (USA)	Alydar (USA)
Sire Drefong (USA) 2013	Gio Ponti (USA); 2005	Cipeta Springs (USA)	Salt Spring (ARG)
Sire Drefong (USA) 2013	Eltimaas (USA); 2007	Ghostzapper (USA)	Awesome Again (CAN)
Sire Drefong (USA) 2013	Eltimaas (USA); 2007	Ghostzapper (USA)	Baby Zip (USA)
Sire Drefong (USA) 2013	Eltimaas (USA); 2007	Najecam (USA)	Trempolino(USA)
Sire Drefong (USA) 2013	Eltimaas (USA); 2007	Najecam (USA)	Sue Warner(USA)
Dam Epice Arome (JPN) 2009	Daiwa Major (JPN); 2001	Sunday Silence (USA)	Halo (USA)
Dam Epice Arome (JPN) 2009	Daiwa Major (JPN); 2001	Sunday Silence (USA)	Wishing Well (USA)
Dam Epice Arome (JPN) 2009	Daiwa Major (JPN); 2001	Scarlet Bouquet (JPN)	Northern Taste (CAN)
Dam Epice Arome (JPN) 2009	Daiwa Major (JPN); 2001	Scarlet Bouquet (JPN)	Scarlet Ink (USA)
Dam Epice Arome (JPN) 2009	Ratafia (USA); 1999	Cozzene (USA)	Caro (IRE)
Dam Epice Arome (JPN) 2009	Ratafia (USA); 1999	Cozzene (USA)	Ride the Trails (USA)
Dam Epice Arome (JPN) 2009	Ratafia (USA); 1999	Sakura Fabulous (GB)	Fabulous Dancer (USA)
Dam Epice Arome (JPN) 2009	Ratafia (USA); 1999	Sakura Fabulous (GB)	Lola Lola (FR)
