= Lemon Pop =

Japanese thoroughbred racehorse

Lemon Pop レモンポップ
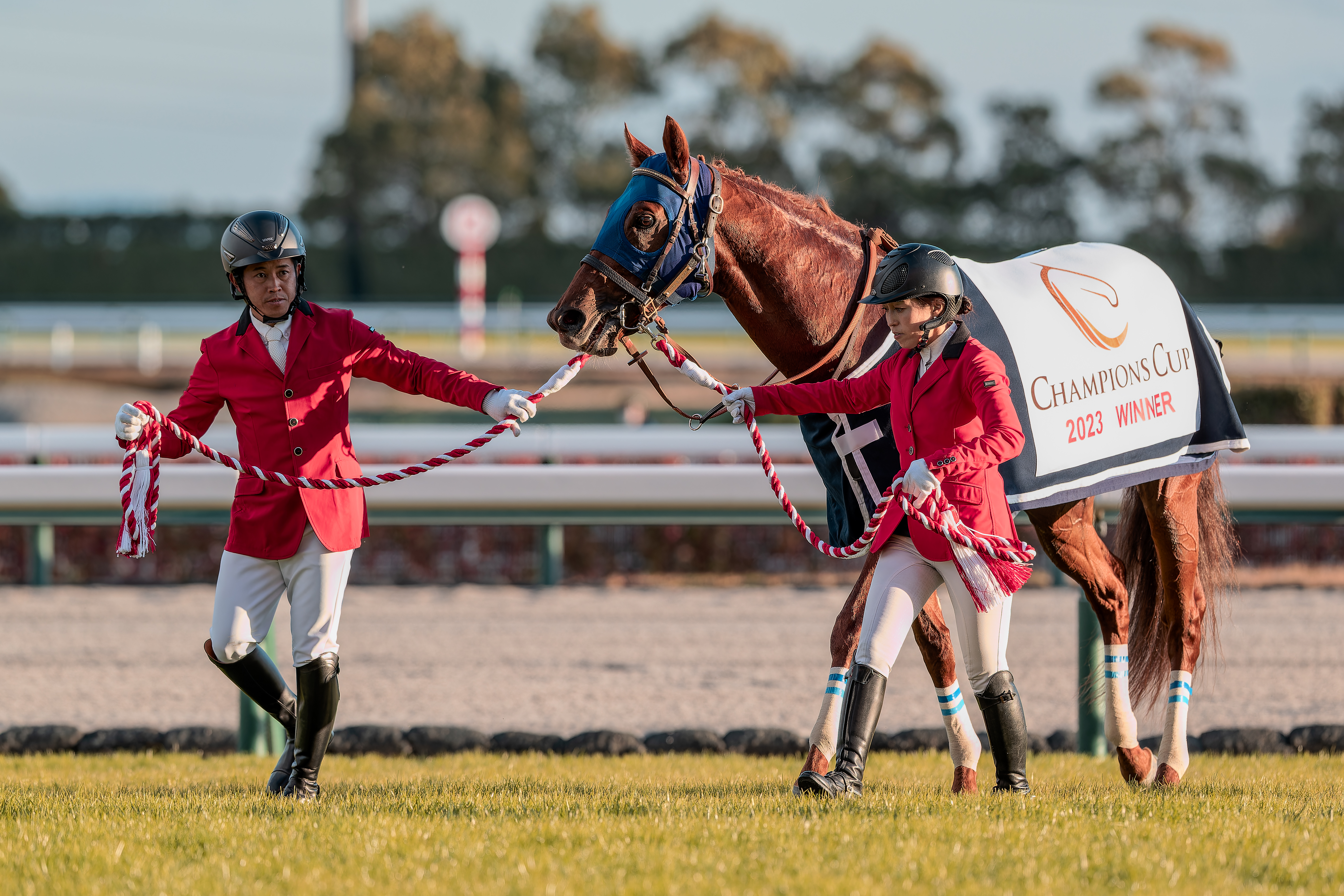
- Lemon Pop after winning the 2023 Champions Cup
- Sire: Lemon Drop Kid
- Grandsire: Kingmambo
- Dam: Unreachable
- Damsire: Giant's Causeway
- Sex: Stallion
- Foaled: February 15, 2018 (age 8)
- Country: United States
- Color: Chestnut
- Breeder: Mr. & Mrs. Oliver S. Tait
- Owner: Godolphin
- Racing colours
- Trainer: Hiroyasu Tanaka
- Jockey: Ryusei Sakai
- Record: 18: 13-3-0
- Earnings: 760,200,000JPY

Major wins
- Negishi Stakes (2023); February Stakes (2023); Mile Championship Nambu Hai (2023, 2024); Champions Cup (2023, 2024); Sakitama Hai (2024)

Awards
- JRA Award for Best Dirt Horse (2023, 2024)
- Last updated on January 8, 2025

Lemon Pop (Japanese: レモンポップ; foaled February 15, 2018) is a retired American-bred, Japanese-trained Thoroughbred racehorse. His major wins include the February Stakes, Mile Championship Nambu Hai, and Champions Cup. He was awarded the JRA Award for Best Dirt Horse for 2023 and 2024.

His name was derived from a Japanese beverage named "Lemon Squash" (レモンスカッシュ).

== Racing career ==
=== 2020/2021: two/three-year old season ===
Lemon Pop made his debut at the Tokyo Racecourse on November 7, 2020, in a race on dirt for two-year old newcomers over 1,300 meters, and won the race with Keita Tosaki in the saddle. Three weeks later, he won the Cattleya Stakes. In his three-year old season, he was pre-registered to the UAE Derby and the Kentucky Derby but was withdrawn and sent to graze. After a long rest, he finally returned on December 12, 2021, racing in Shukugawa Tokubetsu at Hanshin Racecourse. He was ridden by Cristian Demuro this time and finished second.

=== 2022: four-year old season ===
Lemon Pop made his four-year old debut on January 5, 2022, with Cristian Demuro still in the saddle but placed second again. Three weeks later he was reunited with Keita Tosaki and won his second race of the season, finally entering the three-win class. He went on to win three consecutive races, the Kamakura Stakes on April 24, the Keyaki Stakes on May 28, and after a long rest, the Perseus Stakes on October 30. He finally made his graded stakes debut on November 12 in the grade 3 Musashino Stakes at the Tokyo Racecourse over a distance of 1,600 meters. Still ridden by Keita Tosaki, he took the lead from Bathrat Leon in the final straight but was caught on the wire by Gilded Mirror to finish second by a nose.

=== 2023: five-year old season ===
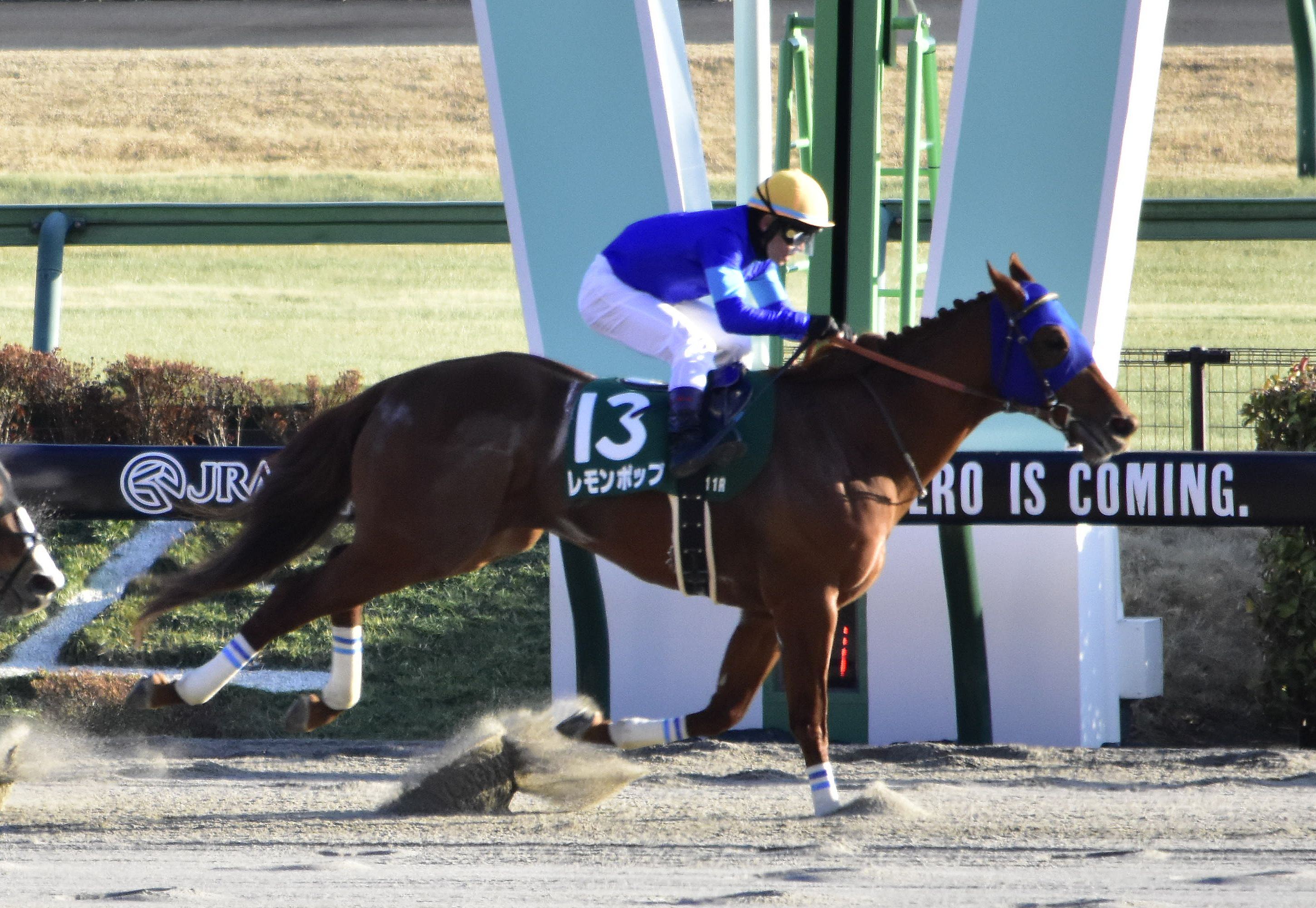
2023 Negishi Stakes

Lemon Pop started his five-year old season on January 29, 2023, racing in the grade 3 Negishi Stakes, and still ridden by Keita Tosaki. Cutting back the distance to 1,400 meters, he was able to hold off the late surging Gilded Mirror, finally achieving his first graded stakes victory.

On February 8, it was announced that his next race is the February Stakes at the Tokyo Racecourse on February 19, his first grade 1 stakes race challenge, with Ryusei Sakai replacing Keita Tosaki on the saddle. His trainer, Hiroyasu Tanaka, mentioned, "He had a tough race the last time (Negishi Stakes), but he worked hard to recover last week and his fatigue has worn off already." On race day, he was the most popular horse with the winning odds of 2.2. He got off to a decent start and traveled in a good position throughout the back stretch and into the third and fourth corners. Entering into the final stretch, he finally took the lead from Dry Stout and continued to charge forward, with Red le Zele surging from the far outside, he worked hard to maintain his lead and successfully held off Red le Zele, winning the race and achieving his first grade 1 stakes victory. The day after the race, Hiroyasu Tanaka's assistant trainer said, "He ran hard, so he's obviously tired both physically and mentally. He's had two tough races in a row in a short period of time, and he's a hard working horse. He maintained his appetite so he's eating well, he's still very motivated."

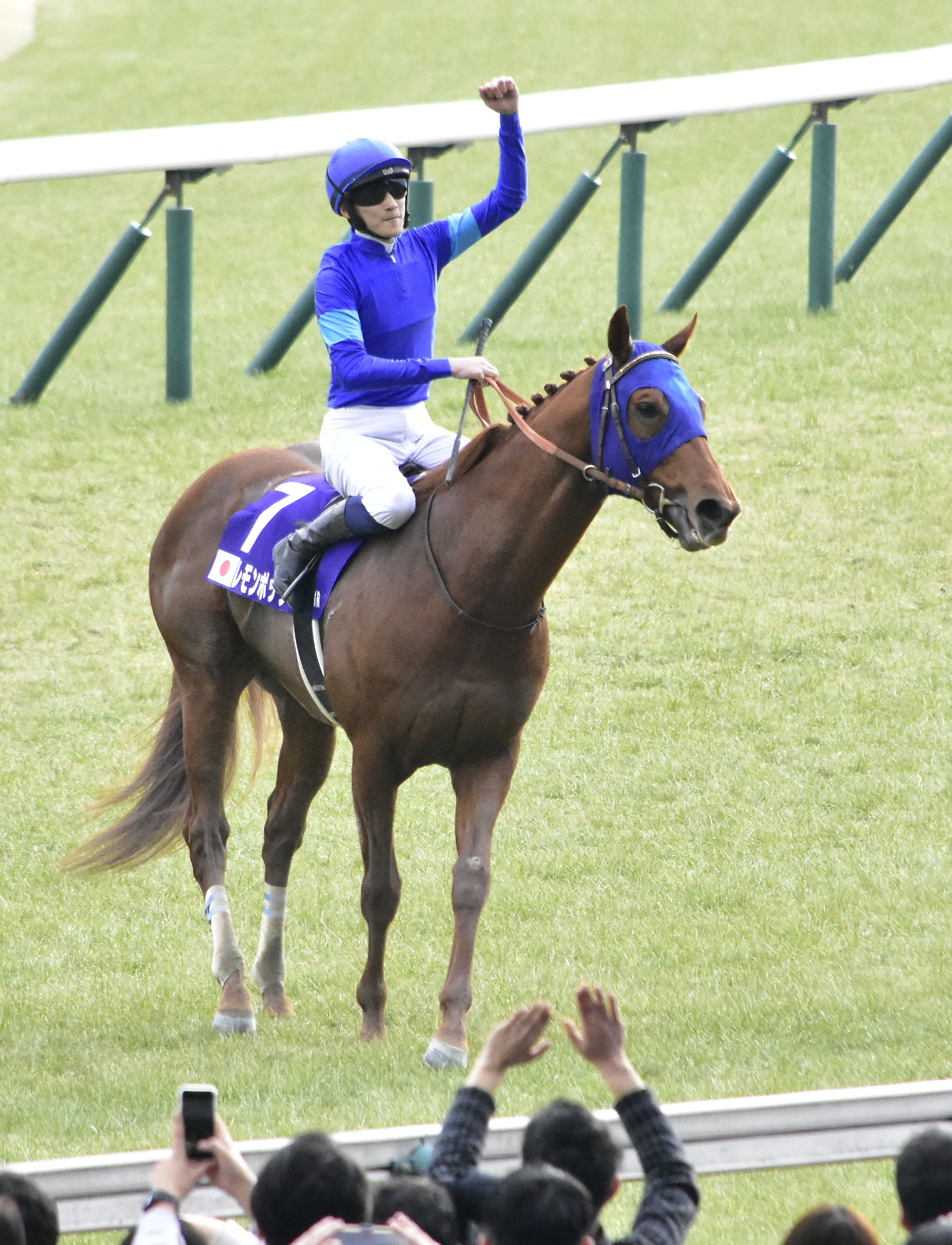
2023 February Stakes

He was registered to run in the Dubai Golden Shaheen on March 25 at Meydan Racecourse. He ran in the Dubai Golden Shaheen as planned. Starting the race as the top most popular horse at the winning odds of 2.7 but he lost to 10th place, ending his current winning streak, and placing outside of second for the first time in his career. Hiroyasu Tanaka said in an interview, "It was his first 1,200 meter race, the flow of the race was tough for him. The pace produced by the world's top horses confused him and when he was urged on, there was no response. I need to rethink whether the distance was right for him or not, he looked so puzzled today. The world stage is tougher than I imagined. We have decided to let him rest for now. We will start over with him and show everyone an even stronger Lemon Pop next time."

He took a break until autumn and returned to race in the domestic grade 1 Mile Championship Nambu Hai on October 9 at Morioka Racecourse. At race day, he was the most popular horse at 1.5 winning odds. He took an early lead in the race and led all the way entering into the final straight. He further lengthened his lead with no one else challenged him, finishing the race with more than ten lengths ahead of Igniter, setting a record win in lengths in the history of the race.

On October 11, Godolphin Japan's representative, Harry Sweeney, mentioned regarding his next race, "We haven't decided yet but we do have three options, the 6-furlong JBC Sprint, the Breeders' Cup Sprint at Santa Anita, or the 9-furlong Champions Cup ran in early December". On the 17th, it was decided that his next race will be the Champions Cup on December 3 at Chukyo Racecourse, with jockey Ryusei Sakai still in the saddle. This will be his first two-turn race and his first at 1,800 meters. On race day, he was the top most popular horse at winning odds of 3.8. He started from the widest gate and took the lead immediately before entering the first corner. He maintained the lead well into the back stretch and into the third and fourth corners. Entering the final stretch with Dura Erede looming from his right, he started to lengthen his lead well into the final furlongs of the race, with no one else to catch him until Wilson Tesoro ran a late charge from the outside but was unable to catch up. He won the race with a length and a quarter ahead of Wilson Tesoro, making him the fourth horse in history to win both the February Stakes and the Champions Cup in the same year, achieving the feat for the first time in six years since Gold Dream in 2017. He was awarded by the JRA as the best dirt horse for 2023.

== Racing statistics ==
Below data is based on data available on JBIS Search, NetKeiba.com, Emirates Racing Authority, and TotalPerformanceData.com.

Date	Track	Race	Class	Distance (Condition)	Field	HN	Odds (Favored)	Finish	Time	Winning (Losing) Margins	Jockey	Winner (Runner-up)	Ref
2020 – two-year-old season
Nov 7	Tokyo	Two Year Old Debut		Dirt 1,300 m (Firm)	14	10	1.7 (1st)	1st	1:18.2	3 lengths	Keita Tosaki	(Satono Mustang)	
Nov 28	Tokyo	Cattleya Stakes	OP	Dirt 1,600 m (Firm)	11	1	2.4 (2nd)	1st	1:36.4	1 1/2 lengths	Keita Tosaki	(Takeru Pegasus)	
2021 – three-year-old season
Dec 12	Hanshin	Shukugawa Tokubetsu	2 Win	Dirt 1,400 m (Firm)	16	3	2.2 (1st)	2nd	1:24.2	(1 1/4 lengths)	Cristian Demuro	Keiai Dorie	
2022 – four-year-old season
Jan 5	Chukyo	Four Year Old and Up	2 Win	Dirt 1,400 m (Firm)	16	15	1.6 (1st)	2nd	1:24.0	(1 length)	Cristian Demuro	Tosen Alan	
Jan 30	Tokyo	Four Year Old and Up	2 Win	Dirt 1,400 m (Firm)	16	6	1.5 (1st)	1st	1:24.6	3 1/2 lengths	Keita Tosaki	(Nordlys)	
Apr 24	Tokyo	Kamakura Stakes	3 Win	Dirt 1,400 m (Good)	16	8	1.4 (1st)	1st	1:22.8	6 lengths	Keita Tosaki	(Fascinate Z)	
May 28	Tokyo	Keyaki Stakes	OP	Dirt 1,400 m (Good)	16	8	1.6 (1st)	1st	1:22.9	2 1/2 lengths	Keita Tosaki	(Tagano Beauty)	
Oct 30	Tokyo	Perseus Stakes	OP	Dirt 1,400 m (Firm)	16	13	1.4 (1st)	1st	1:22.7	4 lengths	Keita Tosaki	(Taisei Samson)	
Nov 12	Tokyo	Musashino Stakes	GIII	Dirt 1,600 m (Firm)	16	7	1.7 (1st)	2nd	1:35.6	(nose)	Keita Tosaki	Gilded Mirror	
2023 – five-year-old season
Jan 29	Tokyo	Negishi Stakes	GIII	Dirt 1,400 m (Firm)	16	13	1.6 (1st)	1st	1:22.5	1/2 length	Keita Tosaki	(Gilded Mirror)	
Feb 19	Tokyo	February Stakes	GI	Dirt 1,600 m (Firm)	16	7	2.2 (1st)	1st	1:35.6	1 1/2 lengths	Ryusei Sakai	(Red le Zele)	
Mar 25	Meydan	Dubai Golden Shaheen	GI	Dirt 1,200 m (Fast)	14	5	2.7 (1st)	10th	1:11.77	(6 lengths)	Ryusei Sakai	Sibelius	
Oct 9	Morioka	Mile CS Nambu Hai	JpnI (Note: The race is classified as a local, Japanese Grade 1 event. Internationally as a Listed event.)	Dirt 1,600 m (Good)	14	3	1.5 (1st)	1st	1:33.8	11 lengths	Ryusei Sakai	(Igniter)	
Dec 3	Chukyo	Champions Cup	GI	Dirt 1,800 m (Firm)	15	15	3.8 (1st)	1st	1:50.6	1 1/4 lengths	Ryusei Sakai	(Wilson Tesoro)	
2024 – six-year-old season
Feb 24	King Abdulaziz	Saudi Cup	GI	Dirt 1,800 m (Fast)	14	7	5.4 (3rd)	12th	1:53.1	(20 lengths)	Ryusei Sakai	Senor Buscador	
Jun 19	Urawa	Sakitama Hai	JpnI	Dirt 1,400 m (Soft)	12	7	1.2 (1st)	1st	1:26.7	2 lengths	Ryusei Sakai	(Igniter)	
Oct 14	Morioka	Mile CS Nambu Hai	JpnI	Dirt 1,600 m (Firm)	15	1	1.1 (1st)	1st	1:35.9	3/4 length	Ryusei Sakai	(Peptide Nile)	
Dec 1	Chukyo	Champions Cup	GI	Dirt 1,800 m (Firm)	16	2	2.2 (1st)	1st	1:50.1	nose	Ryusei Sakai	(Wilson Tesoro)	

== Pedigree ==
Pedigree of Lemon Pop (USA), chestnut stallion, 2018
Sire Lemon Drop Kid b. 1996	Kingmambo b. 1990	Mr. Prospector	Raise a Native
Sire Lemon Drop Kid b. 1996	Kingmambo b. 1990	Mr. Prospector	Gold Digger
Sire Lemon Drop Kid b. 1996	Kingmambo b. 1990	Miesque	Nureyev
Sire Lemon Drop Kid b. 1996	Kingmambo b. 1990	Miesque	Pasadoble
Sire Lemon Drop Kid b. 1996	Charming Lassie dk.b. 1987	Seattle Slew	Bold Reasoning
Sire Lemon Drop Kid b. 1996	Charming Lassie dk.b. 1987	Seattle Slew	My Charmer
Sire Lemon Drop Kid b. 1996	Charming Lassie dk.b. 1987	Lassie Dear	Buckpasser
Sire Lemon Drop Kid b. 1996	Charming Lassie dk.b. 1987	Lassie Dear	Gay Missile
Dam Unreachable ch. 2009	Giant's Causeway ch. 1997	Storm Cat	Storm Bird (CAN)
Dam Unreachable ch. 2009	Giant's Causeway ch. 1997	Storm Cat	Terlingua
Dam Unreachable ch. 2009	Giant's Causeway ch. 1997	Mariah's Storm	Rahy
Dam Unreachable ch. 2009	Giant's Causeway ch. 1997	Mariah's Storm	Immense
Dam Unreachable ch. 2009	Harpia b. 1994	Danzig	Northern Dancer (CAN)
Dam Unreachable ch. 2009	Harpia b. 1994	Danzig	Pas de Nom
Dam Unreachable ch. 2009	Harpia b. 1994	Razyana	His Majesty
Dam Unreachable ch. 2009	Harpia b. 1994	Razyana	Spring Adieu (CAN)
