= Costa Nova (horse) =

Japanese racehorse

Costa Nova コスタノヴァ
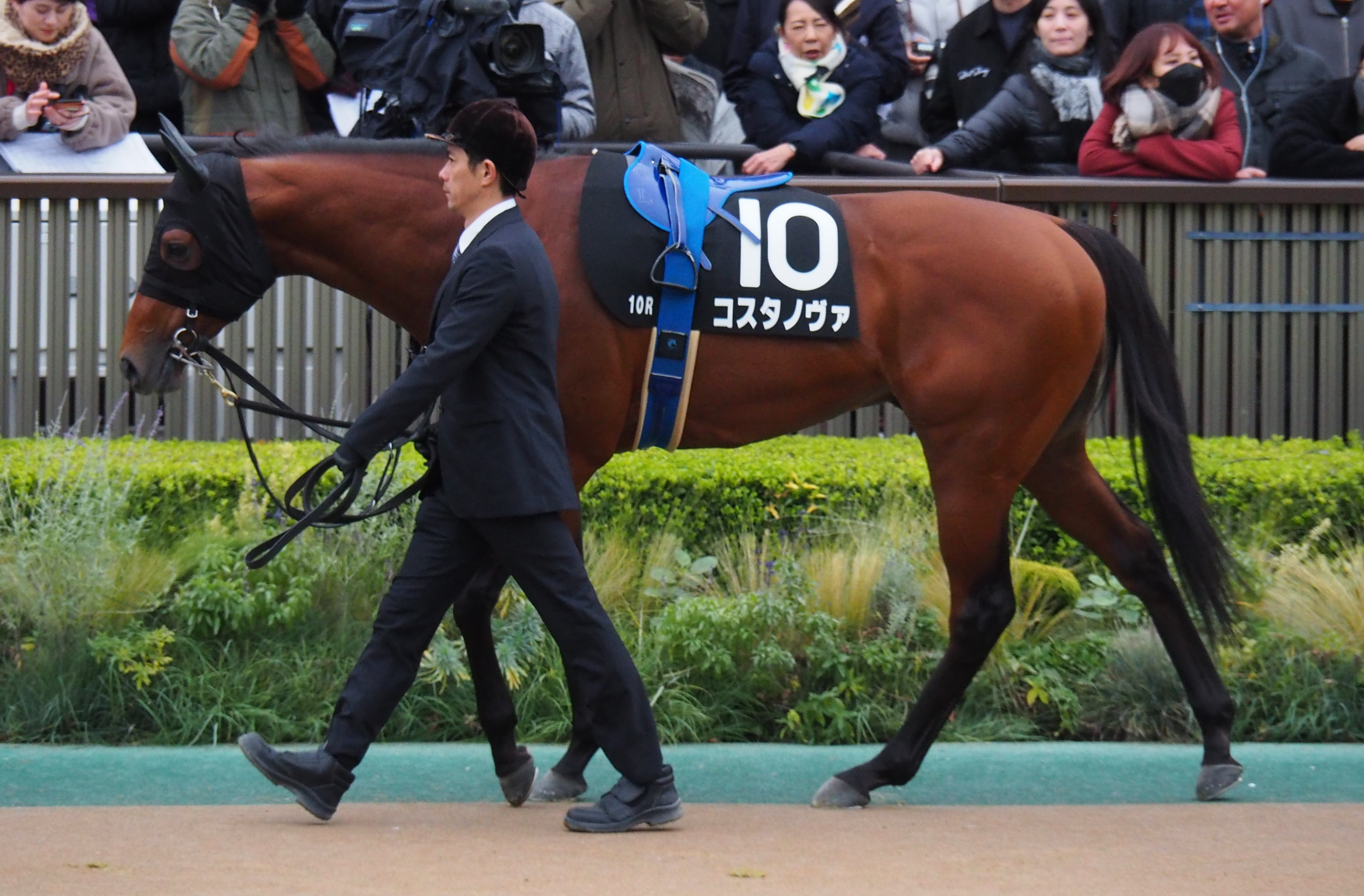
- Costa Nova at the Applause Sho parade ring (2023)
- Sire: Lord Kanaloa
- Grandsire: King Kamehameha
- Dam: Colorful Blossom
- Damsire: Heart's Cry
- Sex: Colt
- Foaled: April 3, 2020 (age 6); Abira, Hokkaido
- Country: Japan
- Color: Bay
- Breeder: Northern Farm
- Owner: Katsumi Yoshida
- Racing colours
- Trainer: Tetsuya Kimura
- Jockey: Christophe Lemaire; Rachel King
- Record: 15: 8-2-1-4
- Earnings: 434,545,000 JPY

Major wins
- February Stakes (2025, 2026); Negishi Stakes (2025)
- Last updated on February 23, 2026

Costa Nova (Japanese: コスタノヴァ) is a retired Japanese racehorse and active stud.

== Racing career ==
=== 2022 and 2023: two and three-year-old seasons ===
Costa Nova made his racing debut on December 25, 2022, in a two-year-old maiden race at Nakayama Racecourse, but finished a disappointing 11th. At age three, he switched to dirt racing and quickly found success, winning his first race of the season. Over the course of 2023, he competed in four races and won three of them, and finished second in his only loss.

=== 2024: four-year-old season ===
Costa Nova began the year strongly, winning the Hakurei Stakes on February 4 and earning promotion to the open class. Racing strategically throughout the season, he captured his first open-class victory three months later in the Keyaki Stakes. His first major stakes appearance came in August at the Cluster Cup, his debut over the 1200-meter distance, where he entered as the second favorite but finished sixth. He was scheduled to contest the Musashino Stakes in November but was forced to withdraw due to persistent swelling beneath his left eye.

=== 2025: five-year-old season ===
Costa Nova started his five-year-old campaign in the Negishi Stakes on February 2. Launching a powerful move down the stretch, he surged clear to win by four lengths over Lord Fons, securing his first major race victory. Just three weeks later, on February 23, he stepped up to compete in his first Grade I race, the February Stakes. With jockey Rachel King taking over the reins (replacing Takeshi Yokoyama, who had ridden him in the Negishi Stakes but had chosen to ride Emperor Wakea), he seized the lead early and held off a fierce late challenge from Sunrise Zipangu to claim victory. Rachel King became the first female jockey in Japan Racing Association history to win a flat GI race.

=== 2026: six-year-old season ===
The first goal of the year for Costa Nova this time is to defend his title in the February Stakes. On the race day, Costa Nova loomed at the back in the early to mid race. On the final uphill stretch, he moved to outside and joined a four-horse rally to the line with Brian Sense, W Heart Bond and Wilson Tesoro. He got better acceleration than his contention and took the lead on final 100 m to win the race. Christophe Lemaire who jockeying him since the last autumn said that Costa Nova win attributed to his ability to positioned himself calmly behind Wilson Tesoro and shifted to the outside for the stretch drive to the wire. This win earned him a "Win and You're In" spot on the Breeders' Cup Classic for this year. In May he ran at the Kashiwa Kinen with Damian Lane as his jockey where he botched the start but ran well enough to finish in fourth-place. Lane spoke after the race, "He was in good condition before the race, and he was fine both during the warm-up and behind the gate. There were no problems with him standing, but he didn't get the timing right at the start. He ran his hardest, but the energy he used in the first half affected him at the end. If he had gotten a better start, I think he could have had an even better race." After the race, he was diagnosed with periosteal exposure on his front of left foreleg fetlock and fracture of the fourth metacarpal bone, which would subsided him from the track for three months. He was recovering well from the injury and continuing to exercise, but his team deemed that it would be difficult for him to return fully fit for the next year's February Stakes. The team decided to retire him from racing and assigned him as a stud in October.

== Namesake ==
The horse is named after the Portuguese resort spot of the same name.

== Racing statistics ==
Below data is based on data available on JBIS Search, and netkeiba.

Date	Track	Race	Grade	Distance (Condition)	Entry	HN	Odds (Favored)	Finish	Time	Margins	Jockey	Winner (Runner-up)
2022 – two-year-old season
Dec 25	Nakayama	2YO Maiden Race	/	1,600m (Firm)	16	4	11.9 (4th)	11th	1:38.2	2.2	Tom Marquand	Perifania
2023 – three-year-old season
Mar 11	Nakayama	3YO Maiden Race	/	1,800m (Fast)	16	6	19.1 (4th)	1st	1:53.7	-0.8	Makoto Sugihara	(Gran Sabana)
Jun 4	Tokyo	3YO+ Allowance	1 win	1,600m (Good)	16	12	4.7 (3rd)	1st	1:35.1	-0.1	Christophe Lemaire	(Blazest)
Sep 3	Niigata	Ryotsuwan Tokubetsu	2 win	1,800m (Fast)	15	6	2.0 (1st)	2nd	1:52.5	0.1	Christophe Lemaire	Taisei Episode
Nov 26	Tokyo	Applause Sho	2 Win	1,600m (Fast)	16	10	2.2 (1st)	1st	1:36.3	-0.2	Christophe Lemaire	(Daishin Pisces)
2024 – four-year-old season
Feb 4	Tokyo	Hakurei Stakes	3 Win	1,600m (Fast)	16	5	1.5 (1st)	1st	1:36.5	-0.4	Christophe Lemaire	(Exult)
May 25	Tokyo	Keyaki Stakes	OP	1,400m (Fast)	16	7	3.5 (2nd)	1st	1:21.9	-0.2	Christophe Lemaire	(Emperor Wakea)
Aug 14	Morioka	Cluster Cup	L (JpnIII)	1,200m (Sloppy)	13	12	2.2 (2nd)	6th	1:10.9	0.9	Christophe Lemaire	Don Frankie
2025 – five-year-old season
Feb 2	Tokyo	Negishi Stakes	GIII	1,400m (Good)	16	9	4.6 (2nd)	1st	1:22.6	-0.7	Takeshi Yokoyama	(Lord Fons)
Feb 23	Tokyo	February Stakes	GI	1,600m (Fast)	16	9	4.3 (2nd)	1st	1:35.5	-0.2	Rachel King	(Sunrise Zipangu)
May 5	Funabashi	Kashiwa Kinen	L (JpnI)	1,600m (Fast)	10	7	1.5 (1st)	3rd	1:39.3	0.1	Damian Lane	Shamal
Jun 25	Urawa	Sakitama Hai	L (JpnI)	1,400m (Muddy)	12	3	3.1 (2nd)	11th	1:25.8	2.6	Christophe Lemaire	Shamal
Nov 15	Tokyo	Musashino Stakes	GIII	1,600m (Fast)	16	4	2.8 (1st)	2nd	1:35.8	0,6	Christophe Lemaire	Luxor Cafe
2026 – six-year-old season
Feb 22	Tokyo	February Stakes	GI	1,600m (Fast)	16	12	3.4 (2nd)	1st	1:35.4	-0.1	Christophe Lemaire	(Wilson Tesoro)
May 5	Funabashi	Kashiwa Kinen	L (JpnI)	1,600m (Fast)	13	2	4.8 (2nd)	4th	1:39.5	0.9	Damian Lane	Wilson Tesoro

Legend:
Dirt Turf

== Pedigree ==
Pedigree of Costa Nova
Sire Lord Kanaloa 2008 Bay	King Kamehameha; 2001 Bay	Kingmambo	Mr. Prospector
Sire Lord Kanaloa 2008 Bay	King Kamehameha; 2001 Bay	Kingmambo	Miesque
Sire Lord Kanaloa 2008 Bay	King Kamehameha; 2001 Bay	Manfath	Last Tycoon
Sire Lord Kanaloa 2008 Bay	King Kamehameha; 2001 Bay	Manfath	Pilot Bird
Sire Lord Kanaloa 2008 Bay	Lady Blossom; 1996 Bay	Storm Cat	Storm Bird
Sire Lord Kanaloa 2008 Bay	Lady Blossom; 1996 Bay	Storm Cat	Terlingua
Sire Lord Kanaloa 2008 Bay	Lady Blossom; 1996 Bay	Saratoga Dew	Cormorant
Sire Lord Kanaloa 2008 Bay	Lady Blossom; 1996 Bay	Saratoga Dew	Super Luna
Dam Colorful Blossom 2010 Bay	Heart's Cry; 2001 Bay	Sunday Silence	Halo
Dam Colorful Blossom 2010 Bay	Heart's Cry; 2001 Bay	Sunday Silence	Wishing Well
Dam Colorful Blossom 2010 Bay	Heart's Cry; 2001 Bay	Irish Dance	Tony Bin
Dam Colorful Blossom 2010 Bay	Heart's Cry; 2001 Bay	Irish Dance	Buper Dance
Dam Colorful Blossom 2010 Bay	Tropical Blossom; 1998 Bay	Thunder Gulch	Gulch
Dam Colorful Blossom 2010 Bay	Tropical Blossom; 1998 Bay	Thunder Gulch	Line of Thunder
Dam Colorful Blossom 2010 Bay	Tropical Blossom; 1998 Bay	Barbara Sue	Big Spruce
Dam Colorful Blossom 2010 Bay	Tropical Blossom; 1998 Bay	Barbara Sue	Maytide
