= Procyon Stakes =

Procyon Stakes プロキオンステークス
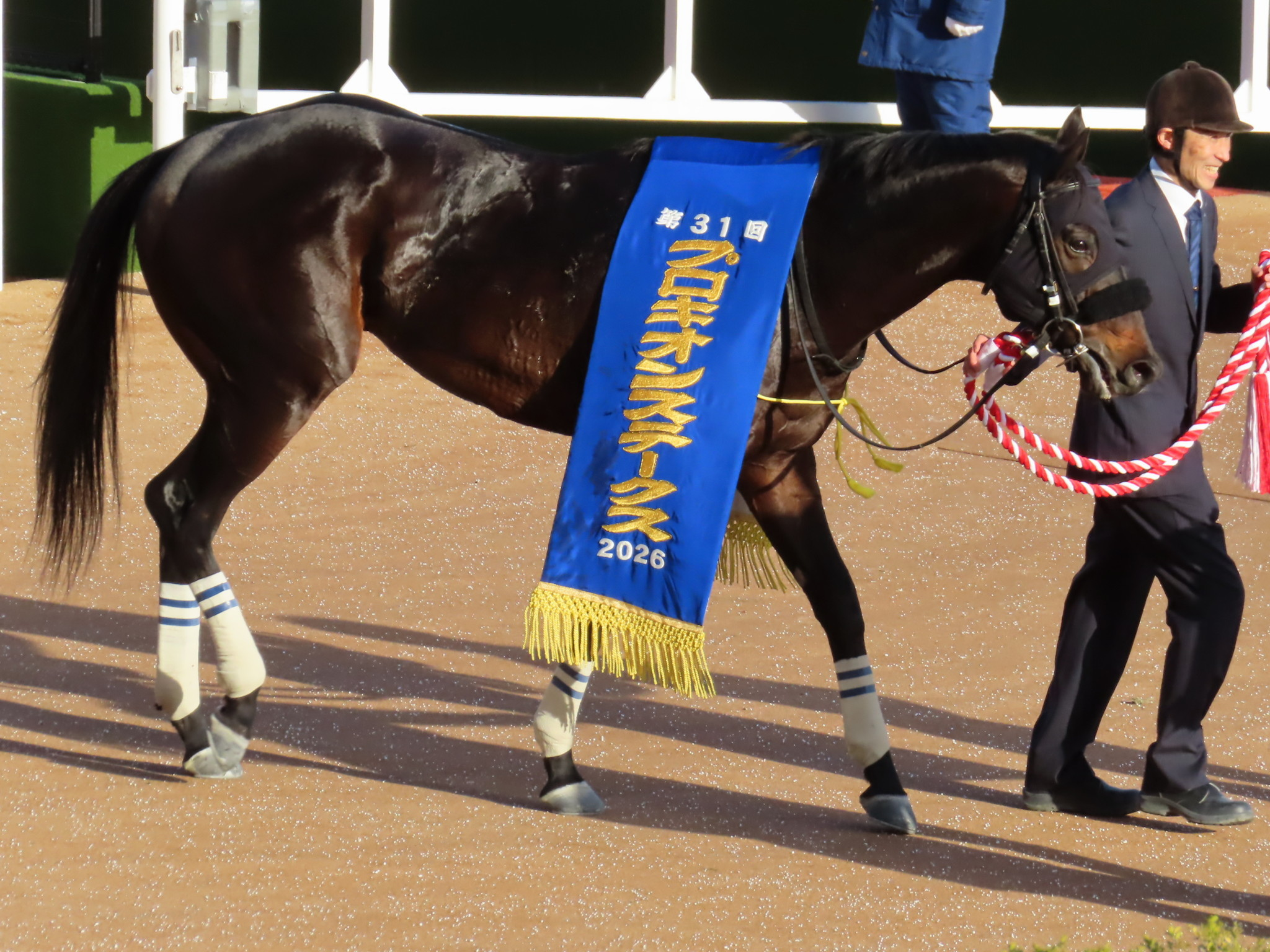
- 2026 Procyon Stakes winner Lord Couronne
- Class: Grade 2
- Location: Kyoto Racecourse
- Inaugurated: April 13, 1996
- Race type: Thoroughbred Flat racing

Race information
- Distance: 1,800 meters
- Surface: Dirt
- Track: Left-handed
- Qualification: 4-y-o+
- Weight: Special Weight
- Purse: ¥ 119,100,000 (as of 2026): 1st: ¥ 55,000,000; 2nd: ¥ 22,000,000; 3rd: ¥ 14,000,000

The Procyon Stakes (プロキオンステークス) is a Grade 2 (GII) flat horse race in Japan.

== Namesake ==
The race is named after Procyon, the brightest star in the constellation Canis Minor and part of the “Winter Triangle” asterism alongside Sirius and Betelgeuse.

== Background ==
The Procyon Stakes is a Grade II dirt Thoroughbred race in Japan open to horses aged four years and older. It is held annually in late January at Kyoto Racecourse over a distance of 1,800 meters on dirt. The race is run under weight-for-age conditions: 56 kg for 4-year-olds, 57 kg for 5-year-olds and up, with fillies and mares receiving a 2 kg allowance. Additional weight penalties apply based on recent graded stakes performances.

Eligibility includes JRA-trained horses (excluding maidens and unraced horses), up to four certified regional (NAR) horses, and foreign-trained horses with priority entry. The first-place prize in 2026 was ¥55 million. The winner receives the "Local Racing National Association Chairman’s Prize" and earns automatic priority entry into the February Stakes (G1).

== History ==
The Procyon Stakes was inaugurated on April 13, 1996, at Hanshin Racecourse over 1,400 meters on dirt as part of the Japan Racing Association’s (JRA) initiative to develop a dedicated dirt stakes program. Originally restricted to horses aged five and older (equivalent to four-year-olds under current international age standards), it allowed up to five NAR horses and permitted foreign-bred entries from the outset.

In 2000, the race shifted from spring (April) to summer (June–July), and the age condition was lowered to four years and older. Following Japan’s adoption of international age standards in 2001, the eligibility was briefly listed as “3-year-olds and up,” though this effectively remained four-year-olds in practice. The race became an international event in 2005, allowing up to four foreign-trained horses; this quota later expanded to eight in 2007 after Japan’s elevation to IFHA Part I status.

The venue changed several times due to infrastructure projects: it moved to Kyoto in 2006, then permanently to Chukyo Racecourse in 2012, where it remained through 2023, except for temporary relocations during track renovations (e.g., to Kokura in 2021, 2022, and 2024 due to Hanshin stand refurbishment). In 2025, the race underwent a major transformation: it was upgraded to GII, moved to January, extended to 1,800 meters, and repositioned as a direct prep for the February Stakes, effectively swapping roles and scheduling with the former Tokai Stakes. In 2026, it relocated to Kyoto again.

== Past winners ==
Year	Winner	Age	Length (in m)	Jockey	Trainer	Owner	Time
1996	Namura Kakuo	5	D1400	Hiroyuki Uemura	Akihiko Nomura	Nobushige Namura	1:23.6
1997	Battle Line	4	D1400	Yutaka Take	Hirosuke Matsuda	Shadai Race Horse Co. Ltd.	1:22.9
1998	Tempai	5	D1400	Norihiro Yokoyama	Nobuharu Fukushima	Emiko Kurita	1:22.7
1999	Tayasu K Point	4	D1400	Kazuhiro Kato	Kiyohiro Tadokoro	Atsushi Nakamura	1:23.2
2000	Gold Tiara	4	D1400	Yutaka Take	Kunihide Matsuda	Kazuko Yoshida	1:21.9
2001	Broad Appeal	7	D1400	Kent Desormeaux	Kunihide Matsuda	Makoto Kaneko	1:22.9
2002	Sterling Rose	5	D1400	Yuichi Fukunaga	Shuji Kitahashi	Kyoei Co. Ltd.	1:22.9
2003	Sterling Rose	6	D1400	Yuichi Fukunaga	Shuji Kitahashi	Kyoei Co. Ltd.	1:23.0
2004	Nihon Pillow Cert	6	D1400	Futoshi Komaki	Tetsuya Meno	Hyakutaro Kobayashi	1:22.3
2005	Blue Concorde	5	D1400	Hideaki Miyuki	Toshiyuki Hattori	Ogibushi Racing Club Co. Ltd.	1:21.9
2006	Meisho Battler	6	D1400	Tetsuzo Sato	Shigetada Takahashi	Yoshio Matsumoto	1:22.0
2007	Wild Wonder	5	D1400	Masayoshi Ebina	Takashi Kubota	Tsunefumi Kusama	1:22.7
2008	Vaincre Tateyama	6	D1400	Kotaro Akagi	Isao Yasuda	Yukio Tsuji	1:22.0
2009	Lanzarote	6	D1400	Yutaka Take	Yasutoshi Ikee	Carrot Farm Co. Ltd.	1:22.7
2010	Keiai Gerbera	4	D1400	Yasunari Iwata	Osamu Hirata	Keiai Prosthetic Materials Sales Co. Ltd.	1:21.8
2011	Silk Fortune	5	D1400	Kota Fujioka	Norio Fujisawa	Silk Racing Co. Ltd.	1:22.1
2012	Toshi Candy	6	D1400	Manabu Sakai	Shoichi Temma	Kanae Kamimura	1:22.6
2013	Admire Royal	6	D1400	Hirofumi Shii	Mitsuru Hashida	Riichi Kondo	1:21.9
2014	Best Warrior	4	D1400	Keita Tosaki	Sei Ishizaka	Yukio Baba	1:22.6
2015	Best Warrior	5	D1400	Yuichi Fukunaga	Sei Ishizaka	Yukio Baba	1:22.5
2016	Nobo Baccara	4	D1400	Mirco Demuro	Shoichi Temma	LS.M Co. Ltd.	1:22.1
2017	King's Guard	6	D1400	Yusuke Fujioka	Ryo Terashima	Nisshin Farm Ltd.	1:22.9
2018	Matera Sky	4	D1400	Yutaka Take	Hideyuki Mori	Tsuyoshi Ono	1:20.3
2019	Arctos	4	D1400	Hironobu Tanabe	Toru Kurita	Koichiro Ono	1:21.2
2020	Sunrise Nova	6	D1400	Fuma Matsuwaka	Hidetaka Otonashi	Takao Matsuoka	1:21.8
2021	Meisho Kazusa	4	D1700	Kohei Matsuyama	Akio Adachi	Yoshio Matsumoto	1:40.9
2022	Gempachi Lucifer	6	D1700	Yuga Kawada	Shozo Sasaki	Takeshi Hirano	1:43.7
2023	Don Frankie	4	D1400	Kenichi Ikezoe	Takashi Saito	Makoto Hayano	1:23.0
2024	Yamanin Ours	4	D1700	Yutaka Take	Takashi Saito	Hajime Doi	1:42.7
2025	Sunday Funday	5	D1800	Katsuma Sameshima	Hidetaka Otonashi	Yoshizawa Holdings Co. Ltd.	1:50.6
2026	Lord Couronne	5	D1800	Kazuo Yokoyama	Hirofumi Shii	Lord Horse Club Co. Ltd.	1:51.0

== See also ==
- Horse racing in Japan
- List of Japanese flat horse races

=== Netkeiba ===
- 1996 en, 1997 en, 1998 en, 1999 en, 2000 en, 2001 en, 2002 en, 2003 en, 2004 en, 2005 en, 2006 en, 2007 en, 2008 en, 2009 en, 2010 en, 2011 en, 2012 en, 2013 en, 2014 en, 2015 en, 2016 en, 2017 en, 2018 en, 2019 en, 2020 en, 2021 en, 2022 en, 2023 en, 2024 en, 2025 en, 2026 en
