= February Stakes =

February Stakes フェブラリーステークス
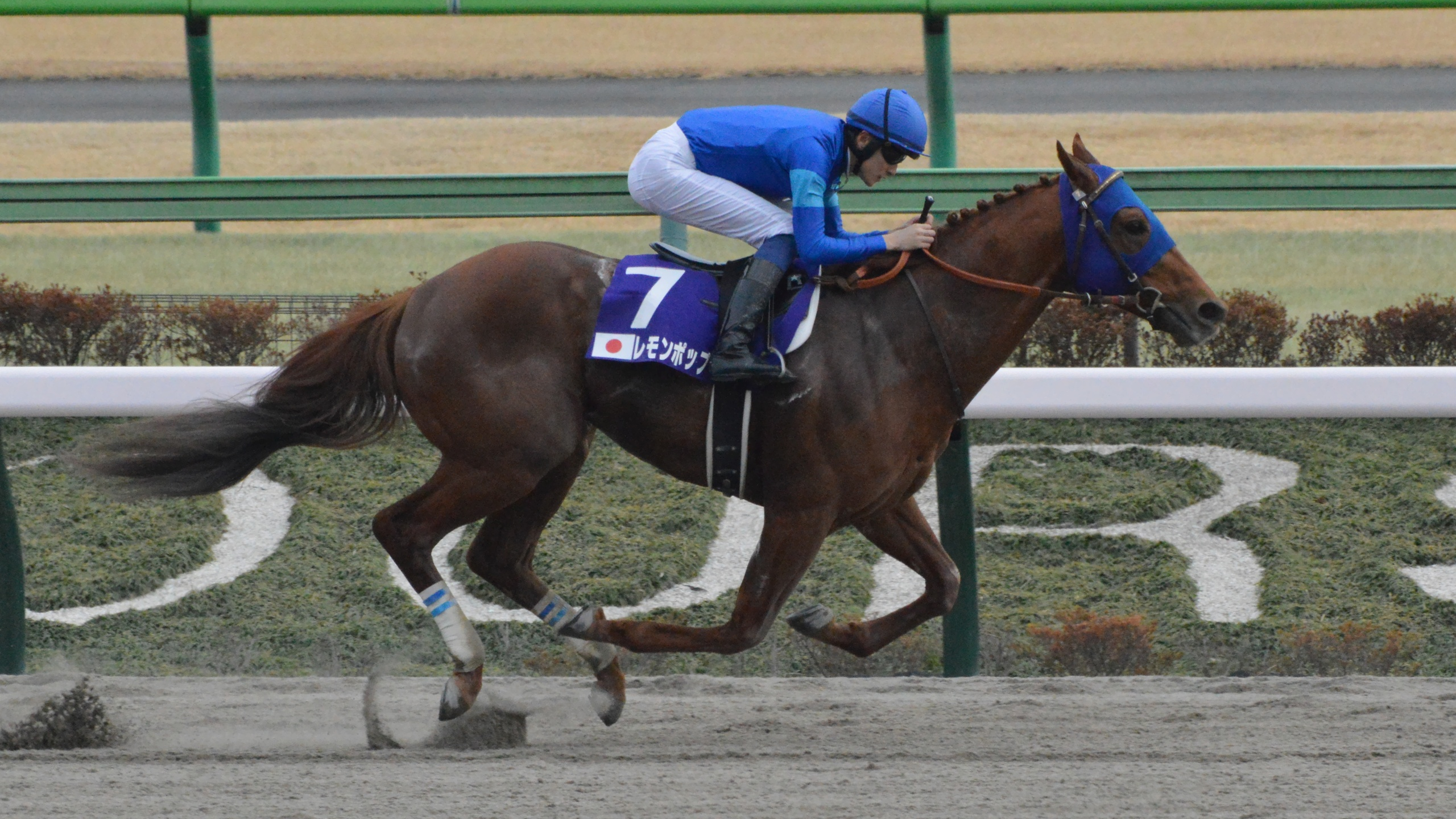
- 2023 February Stakes winner Lemon Pop
- Class: Grade 1
- Location: Tokyo Racecourse
- Inaugurated: February 18, 1984
- Race type: Thoroughbred

Race information
- Distance: 1,600 meters
- Surface: Dirt
- Track: Left-handed
- Qualification: 4-y-o+
- Weight: 4-y-o & up 58 kg Allowances; 2 kg for fillies and mares
- Purse: ¥ 259,200,000 (as of 2025): 1st: ¥ 120,000,000; 2nd: ¥ 48,000,000; 3rd: ¥ 30,000,000

February Stakes
2026
Costa Nova	Wilson Tesoro	W Heart Bond

The February Stakes (フェブラリーステークス) is a Grade 1 flat horse race in Japan.

== Background ==
The February Stakes is a Grade 1 flat race run over a distance of 1,600 metres (approximately 8 furlongs) at Tokyo Racecourse in late February.

== History ==
Originally inaugurated in 1984 as the February Handicap, it began as a Domestic Grade 3 race. Its status steadily rose over the years: it was promoted to Domestic Grade 2 in 1994, the same year it was renamed the February Stakes. In 1995, the race was opened to horses registered with Japan’s National Association of Racing (NAR), broadening the competitive field. It was further elevated to Domestic Grade 1 in 1997.

In 1999, Meisei Opera, made history by becoming the first horse from trained in the NAR to claim victory in a JRA Grade 1 race.

In 2007, the race achieved international Grade 1 status and was opened to horses trained outside Japan, significantly enhancing its global profile.

Today, alongside the Champions Cup, the February Stakes is one of only two Grade 1 dirt races organized by JRA.

Many top contenders at this race make expeditions to Dubai World Cup Night, particularly to the Dubai World Cup, one of the world's richest horse race. In 2011, Transcend, the winner of this race finished second at the 2011 Dubai World Cup, making a close finish with the winner Victoire Pisa, another Japanese contender.

In February 2025, Australian jockey Rachel King made history by becoming the first female rider to win a flat Grade 1 race in Japan.

== Trial races ==
Trial races provide automatic berths to the winning horses.

Race	Grade	Racecourse	Distance	Condition
Procyon Stakes	GII	Kyoto	Dirt 1,800 metres	Winner
Negishi Stakes	GIII	Tokyo	Dirt 1,400 metres	Winner

== Records ==
Speed record:

- 1.33.8 – Cafe Pharoah (2022)

Most wins by a horse (2):

- Copano Rickey (2014, 2015)
- Cafe Pharoah (2021, 2022)
- Costa Nova (2025, 2026)

Most wins by a jockey (5):

- Yutaka Take (2003, 2006, 2008, 2015, 2019)

Most wins by a trainer (3):

- Akira Murayama (2012, 2014, 2015)

Most wins by an owner (4):

- Katsumi Yoshida (2012, 2017, 2025, 2026)

== Winners ==
Year	Winner	Age	Jockey	Trainer	Owner	Time
G3 - February Handicap
1984	Robaria Amon	5	Masato Yoshinaga	Kichisaburo Matsuyama	Uraichi Suga	1:40.1
1985	Andre Amon	6	Hiroyuki Nakajima	Yasuhisa Matsuyama	Amon Inc.	1:36.9
1986	Hatsuno Amoy	5	Eizaburo Otsuka	Yoshio Nakazumi	Hatsutaro Nakagawa	1:36.7
1987	Rikisan Power	6	Masato Shibata	Kunio Takamatsu	Saburo Iwai	1:36.5
1988	Roman Prince	7	Sueo Masuzawa	Seizuke Sato	Long Shoji co.	1:37.7
1989	Velvet Glove	6	Hiroyuki Gohara	Fusamatsu Okubo	Hideo Kuribayashi	1:37.2
1990	Carib Song	4	Masato Shibata	Shuho Kato	Ogifushi Bokujo RC co.	1:36.7
1991	Narita Hayabusa	4	Norihiro Yokoyama	Kentaro Nakao	Hidenori Yamaji	1:34.9
1992	Russian Gold	4	Masayoshi Ebina	Yokichi Okubo	Akihiro Ohara	1:35.4
1993	Meisho Homura	5	Masato Shibata	Shigetada Takahashi	Yoshio Matsumoto	1:35.7
G2 - February Stakes
1994	Cheers Atom	5	Masaru Honda	Kaoru Hoshikawa	Kiyoko Kitamura	1:37.8
1995	Lively Mount	4	Mamoru Ishibashi	Fujio Shibata	Tetsuo Kato	1:36.4
1996	Hokuto Vega	6	Norihiro Yokoyama	Takayoshi Nakano	Kanamorimori Shoji	1:36.5
G1 - February Stakes
1997	Shinko Windy	4	Yukio Okabe	Kiyotaka Tanaka	Osamu Yasuda	1:36.0
1998	Gourmet Frontier	6	Yukio Okabe	Kiyotaka Tanaka	Masayoshi Ishii	1:37.5
1999	Meisei Opera #	5	Isao Sugawara	Shuichi Sasaki	Meisei Shoji co.	1:36.5
2000	Wing Arrow	5	Olivier Peslier	Yoshimi Kudo	Minoru Ikeda	1:35.6
2001	Nobo True	5	Olivier Peslier	Hideyuki Mori	Ikebata	1:35.6
2002	Agnes Digital	5	Hirofumi Shii	Toshiaki Shirai	Takao Watanabe	1:35.1
2003	Gold Allure *	4	Yutaka Take	Yasuo Ikee	Shadai Race Horse co.	1:50.9
2004	Admire Don	5	Katsumi Ando	Hiroyoshi Matsuda	Riichi Kondo	1:36.8
2005	Meisho Bowler	4	Yuichi Fukunaga	Toshiaki Shirai	Yoshio Matsumoto	1:34.7
2006	Kane Hekili	4	Yutaka Take	Katsuhiko Sumii	Makoto Kaneko	1:34.9
2007	Sunrise Bacchus	5	Katsumi Ando	Hidetaka Otonashi	Takao Matsuoka	1:34.8
2008	Vermilion	6	Yutaka Take	Sei Ishizaka	Sunday Racing	1:35.3
2009	Success Brocken	4	Hiroyuki Uchida	Hideaki Fujiwara	Tetsu Takashima	1:34.6
2010	Espoir City	5	Tetsuzo Sato	Akio Adachi	Yushun Horse Club	1:34.9
2011	Transcend	5	Shinji Fujita	Takayuki Yasuda	Koji Maeda	1.36.4
2012	Testa Matta	6	Yasunari Iwata	Akira Murayama	Katsumi Yoshida	1.35.4
2013	Grape Brandy	5	Suguru Hamanaka	Takayuki Yasuda	Shadai Race Horse co.	1.35.1
2014	Copano Rickey	4	Hironobu Tanabe	Akira Murayama	Sachiaki Kobayashi	1.36.0
2015	Copano Rickey	5	Yutaka Take	Akira Murayama	Sachiaki Kobayashi	1.36.3
2016	Moanin	4	Mirco Demuro	Sei Ishizaka	Yukio Baba	1.34.0
2017	Gold Dream	4	Mirco Demuro	Osamu Hirata	Katsumi Yoshida	1.35.1
2018	Nonkono Yume	6	Hiroyuki Uchida	Yukihiro Kato	Kazumasa Yamada	1.36.0
2019	Inti	5	Yutaka Take	Kenji Nonaka	Shigeo Takeda	1.35.6
2020	Mozu Ascot	6	Christophe Lemaire	Yoshito Yahagi	Capital System	1.35.2
2021	Cafe Pharoah	4	Christophe Lemaire	Noriyuki Hori	Koichi Nishikawa	1.34.4
2022	Cafe Pharoah	5	Yuichi Fukunaga	Noriyuki Hori	Koichi Nishikawa	1.33.8
2023	Lemon Pop	5	Ryusei Sakai	Hiroyasu Tanaka	Godolphin	1.35.6
2024	Peptide Nile	6	Yusuke Fujioka	Hidenori Take	Kazuhiko Numakawa	1:35.7
2025	Costa Nova	5	Rachel King	Tetsuya Kimura	Katsumi Yoshida	1:35.5
2026	Costa Nova	6	Christophe Lemaire	Tetsuya Kimura	Katsumi Yoshida	1:35.4

# Meisei Opera, winner of the 1999 race, belongs to the National Association of Racing(NAR) but not Japan Racing Association(JRA).
* The 2003 race took place at Nakayama Racecourse in distance of 1,800m.

== See also ==
- Horse racing in Japan
- List of Japanese flat horse races
