= Negishi Stakes =

Negishi Stakes 根岸ステークス
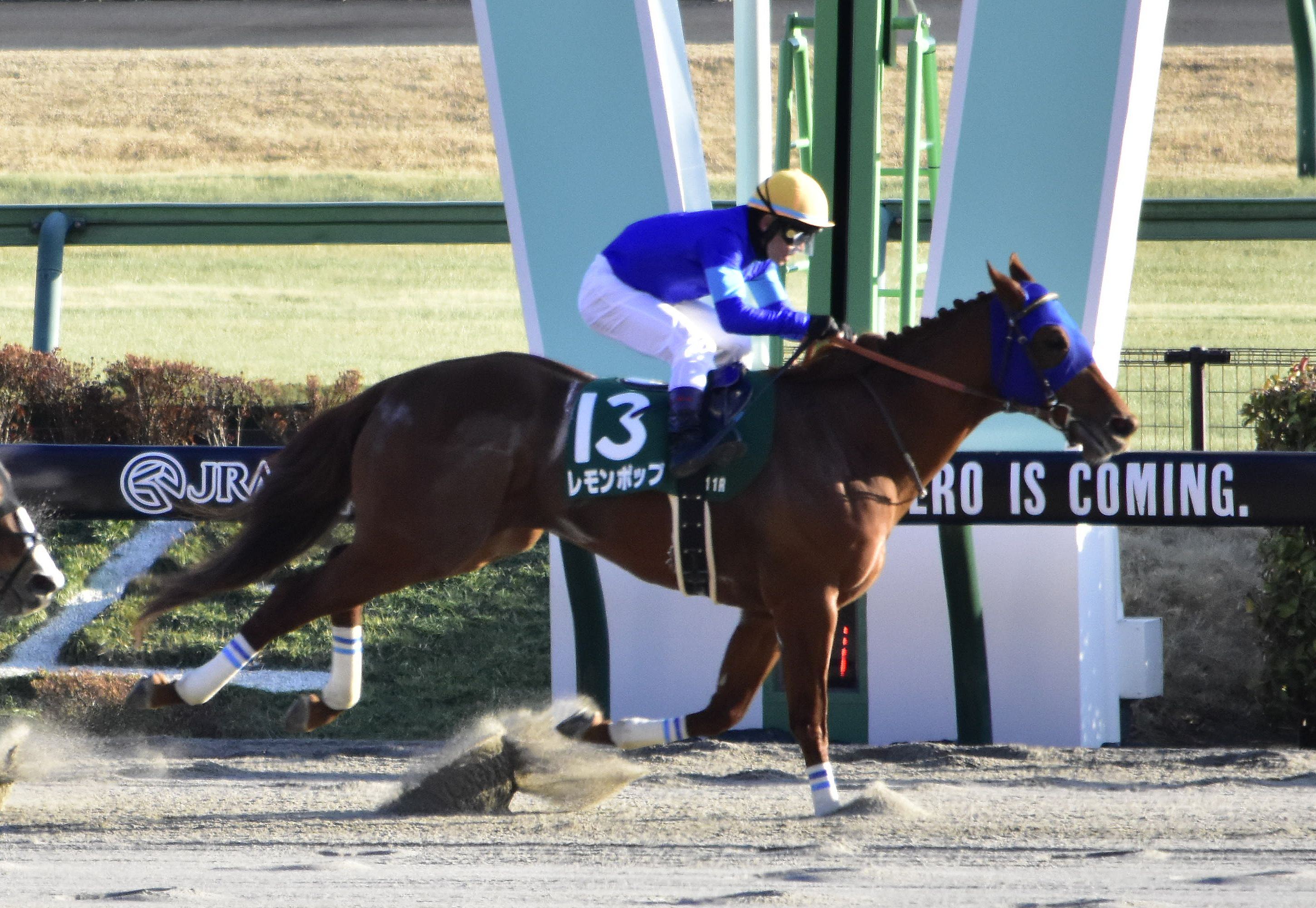
- Lemon Pop winning the 2023 Negishi Stakes
- Class: Grade 3
- Location: Tokyo Racecourse
- Inaugurated: 1987
- Race type: Thoroughbred Flat racing

Race information
- Distance: 1400 metres
- Surface: Dirt
- Track: Left-handed
- Qualification: 4-y-o+
- Weight: Special Weight
- Purse: ¥ 86,400,000 (as of 2026): 1st: ¥ 40,000,000; 2nd: ¥ 16,000,000; 3rd: ¥ 10,000,000

The Negishi Stakes (Japanese 根岸ステークス) is a Grade 3 horse race organized by the Japan Racing Association (JRA) for Thoroughbreds aged four and over. It is run in February over a distance of 1400 metres on dirt at Tokyo Racecourse.

The Negishi Stakes was first run in 1987 and has held Grade 3 status ever since. The race was contested over 1200 metres from 1990 to 2000 and again in 2003. The 2003 edition was run at Nakayama Racecourse. The race is named in honour of Negishi Racecourse, a former horse racing venue in Yokohama.

== Weight ==
57 kg for four-year-olds above.

Allowances:

- 2 kg for fillies / mares
- 1 kg for southern hemisphere bred three-year-olds

Penalties (excluding two-year-old race performance):

- If a graded stakes race has been won within a year:
  - 2 kg for a grade 1 win (1 kg for fillies / mares)
  - 1 kg for a grade 2 win
- If a graded stakes race has been won for more than a year:
  - 1 kg for a grade 1 win

== Past winners ==
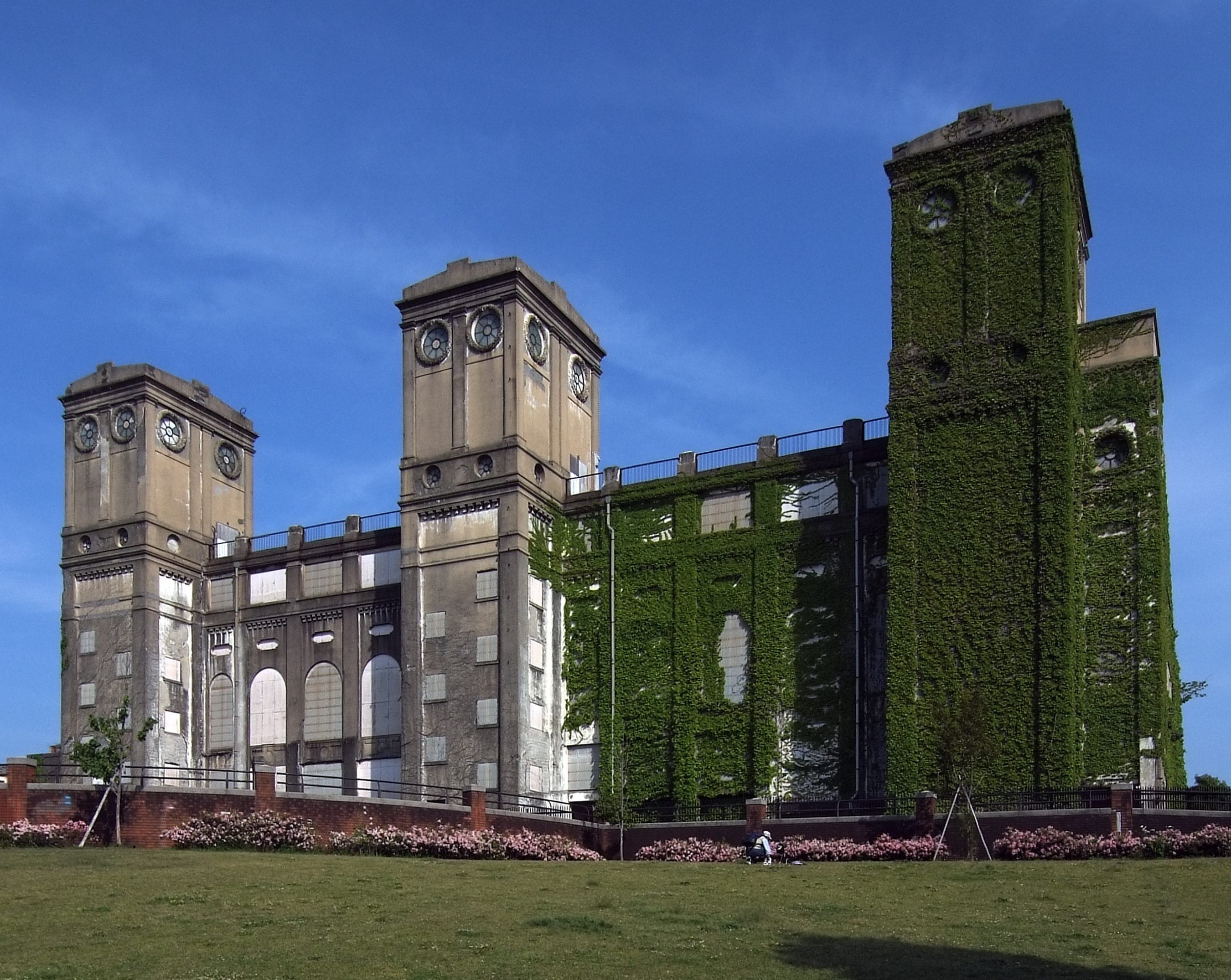
The remains of the former Negishi Racecourse

Year	Winner	Age	Length (in m)	Jockey	Trainer	Owner	Time
1987	Grace Shiraoki	3	D1400m	Seiji Ebisawa	Yoshinami Shimizu	Masahiro Hiranoi	1:23.4
1988	Winning Smile	5	D1400m	Masamitsu Tamura	Terumasa Yano	Fusa Shirai	1:24.4
1989	Dyna Letter	5	D1400m	Hiroaki Sugiura	Toshio Nihonyanagi	Shadai Race Horse Co. Ltd.	1:23.8
1990	Eiko Trans	6	D1200m	Shoichi Osaki	Isao Yasuda	Kenichi Ikeuchi	1:10.0
1991	Tomoe Regent	3	D1200m	Yasuhiro Nemoto	Teruo Hashimoto	Toshihiko Okamoto	1:10.0
1992	Happy Guinness	6	D1200m	Yoshitomi Shibata	Yasuo Nishizuka	Junko Sano	1:11.0
1993	Prost Line	4	D1200m	Yukio Okabe	Yasuhisa Matsuyama	Shadai Race Horse Co. Ltd.	1:12.3
1994	Fujino Makken O	3	D1200m	Yukio Okabe	Yoshio Nakamura	Fumie Takahashi	1:10.9
1995	Young Ebros	3	D1200m	Hiroki Hashimoto	Tsugio Yanagida	Shigeo Kajiwara	1:10.9
1996	Stone Stepper	3	D1200m	Shigefumi Kumazawa	Tetsuya Meno	Isao Ogawa	1:10.6
1997	Washington Color	3	D1200m	Yoshitomi Shibata	Yasuhisa Matsuyama	Tenjin Co., Ltd.	1:11.2
1998	Washington Color	4	D1200m	Yoshitomi Shibata	Yasuhisa Matsuyama	Tenjin Co., Ltd.	1:10.5
1999	Select Green	4	D1200m	Katsuharu Tanaka	Hidetaka Otonashi	Green Farm Co. Ltd.	1:09.2
2000	Broad Appeal	6	D1200m	Koshiro Take	Kunihide Matsuda	Makoto Kaneko	1:10.1
2001	Nobo True	5	D1400m	Olivier Peslier	Hideyuki Mori	LS.M Co.,Ltd.	1:22.1
2002	South Vigorous	6	D1400m	Yoshitomi Shibata	Yoshiyasu Takahashi	Hisashi Namba	1:22.8
2003	South Vigorous	7	D1200m	Yoshitomi Shibata	Yoshiyasu Takahashi	Hisashi Namba	1:10.4
2004	Shadow Scape	5	D1400m	Teruo Eda	Hideyuki Mori	Tomokazu Iizuka	1:24.0
2005	Meisho Bowler	4	D1400m	Yuichi Fukunaga	Toshiaki Shirai	Yoshio Matsumoto	1:23.0
2006	Limitless Bid	4	D1400m	Hiroyuki Uchida	Tadashi Kayo	Shadai Race Horse Co. Ltd.	1:23.7
2007	Big Grass	6	D1400m	Issei Murata	Hidemasa Nakao	Wahei Tsubonoya	1:23.5
2008	Wild Wonder	6	D1400m	Yasunari Iwata	Takashi Kubota	Tsunefumi Kusama	1:22.7
2009	Ferrari Pisa	5	D1400m	Yasunari Iwata	Toshiaki Shirai	Yoshimi Ichikawa	1:22.1
2010	Glorious Noah	4	D1400m	Shinichiro Kobayashi	Yoshito Yahagi	Yoko Takano	1:23.7
2011	Sei Crimson	5	D1400m	Hideaki Miyuki	Toshiyuki Hattori	Seiki Kaneda	1:23.0
2012	Silk Fortune	6	D1400m	Kota Fujioka	Norio Fujisawa	Silk Racing Co. Ltd.	1:23.5
2013	Meisho Mashu	5	D1400m	Yusuke Fujioka	Yoshio Oki	Yoshio Matsumoto	1:23.7
2014	Gorski	7	D1400m	Fran Berry	Yasutoshi Ikee	Shadai Race Horse Co. Ltd.	1:23.4
2015	Air Khalifa	6	D1400m	Kosei Miura	Katsuhiko Sumii	Lucky Field Co. Ltd.	1:23.4
2016	Moanin	4	D1400m	Keita Tosaki	Sei Ishizawa	Yukio Baba	1:22.0
2017	Kafuji Take	5	D1400m	Yuichi Fukunaga	Sachio Yukubo	Mamoru Kato	1:23.0
2018	Nonkono Yume	6	D1400m	Hiroyuki Uchida	Yukihiro Kato	Kazumasa Yamada	1:21.5
2019	Copano Kicking	4	D1400m	Oisin Murphy	Akira Murayama	Sachiaki Kobayashi	1:23.5
2020	Mozu Ascot	6	D1400m	Christophe Lemaire	Yoshito Yahagi	Capital System Co. Ltd.	1:22.7
2021	Red Le Zele	5	D1400m	Yuga Kawada	Takayuki Yasuda	Tokyo Horse Racing Co. Ltd.	1:22.3
2022	T M South Dan	5	D1400m	Yasunari Iwata	Yuzo Iida	Masatsugu Takezono	1:23.1
2023	Lemon Pop	5	D1400m	Keita Tosaki	Hiroyasu Tanaka	Godolphin	1:22.5
2024	Emperor Wakea	4	D1400m	Yuga Kawada	Haruki Sugiyama	Tsunefumi Kusama	1:24.1
2025	Costa Nova	5	D1400m	Takeshi Yokoyama	Tetsuya Kimura	Katsumi Yoshida	1:22.6
2026	Lord Fons	6	D1400m	Kazuo Yokoyama	Shogo Yasuda	Lord Horse Club Co., Ltd.	1:23.3

== See also ==
- Horse racing in Japan
- List of Japanese flat horse races
