= List of Umamusume: Pretty Derby episodes =

Umamusume: Pretty Derby is a Japanese anime television series that is based on the Umamusume: Pretty Derby multimedia franchise created by Cygames. The anime currently has three seasons for the main series, four spin-off shorts series, one ONA, one film, and one spin-off anime series.

The first season of the main anime series, produced by P.A. Works, aired from April 2 to June 18, 2018, with the first two episodes being broadcast back-to-back. The second season, now principally produced by Studio Kai with P.A. Works assisting on the production, aired from January 5 to March 30, 2021. The third season, produced solely by Studio Kai, aired from October 5 to December 28, 2023. Crunchyroll streamed the main series.

Various shorts series would also be released. An anime television series based on the four-panel manga spinoff Umayon (うまよん) aired from July 7 to September 22, 2020. A Blu-ray box set, which includes 12 new episodes, was released on December 8, 2021. A short anime series titled Umayuru (うまゆる) was released on YouTube from October 16, 2022, to March 26, 2023. A short anime series focusing on characters based on renowned gray racehorses, titled Umayuru: Pretty Gray (うまゆる ぷりてぃ〜ぐれい), was released on YouTube from April 30 to May 6, 2025. A short anime series, titled Umayuru: Full Gate! (うまゆる ふるげ～と！), began releasing on YouTube on September 27, 2026.

Cypic would later produce various spin-offs within the franchise. An anime ONA series, titled Umamusume: Pretty Derby – Road to the Top (ウマ娘 プリティーダービー Road to the Top, Umamusume Puritī Dābī Rōdo tū za Toppu), was released on YouTube from April 16 to May 7, 2023. An anime film titled Umamusume: Pretty Derby – Beginning of a New Era (ウマ娘 プリティーダービー 新時代の扉, Umamusume Puritī Dābī Shinjidai no Tobira) was released in Japanese theaters on May 24, 2024. An anime television series adaptation of the Umamusume: Cinderella Gray (ウマ娘 シンデレラグレイ) manga series aired in two split cours, with the first cours airing from April 6 to June 29, 2025, and the second cours airing from October 5 to December 21, 2025.

== Series overview ==
Season	Episodes		Originally released	
Season	Episodes		First released	Last released
1	13		April 2, 2018	June 18, 2018
2	13		January 5, 2021	March 30, 2021
3	13		October 5, 2023	December 28, 2023
CG	23	13	April 6, 2025	June 29, 2025
CG	23	10	October 5, 2025	December 21, 2025

== Episodes ==
=== Main series ===
==== Season 1 (2018) ====
No. overall	No. in season	Title	Directed by (Note: Information is taken from the ending credits of each episode.)	Written by	Storyboarded by	Original release date
1	1	"Gate of Dreams!"; Transliteration: "Yume no Gēto!" (Japanese: 夢のゲートっ！)	Kei Oikawa & Tomoaki Ōta	Masafumi Sugiura	Kei Oikawa	April 2, 2018
Special Week arrives in Tokyo, dreaming to become the best Umamusume in Japan. On her first day, she repeatedly declines a man who is impressed by her physique and watches a race to see Silence Suzuka win, before enrolling at Tracen Academy. Special Week befriends various students and participates at a practice run to scout potential talent for Tracen's teams. Special Week is suddenly kidnapped by a group of students, who bring her to the man. The man introduces himself as the Trainer of Team Spica, consisting of Vodka, Daiwa Scarlet, and Gold Ship. They also introduce Silence Suzuka as a recent transferee from the elite Team Rigil. The Trainer promises he will bring out Special Week's potential and realize her dreams, motivating Special Week to join the team and hone her talent alongside her idol Silence Suzuka.
2	2	"The Debut Race Out of Nowhere"; Transliteration: "Ikinari no Debyū-sen" (Japanese: いきなりのデビュー戦)	Yuriko Abe & Fumihiko Suganuma	Masafumi Sugiura	Kei Oikawa	April 2, 2018
Special Week trains with Team Spica for her upcoming Twinkle Series debut race. During that time, Special Week becomes roommates with Silence Suzuka, meets Tracen's student council president Symboli Rudolf and is given a campus tour by Symboli Rudolf's protégé Tokai Teio. Special Week becomes nervous for her debut race despite asking her peers for advice but calms herself in time with Silence Suzuka's support, allowing Special Week to open up on her dream being a way of honoring her adoptive mother and late biological mother's wishes. Special Week faces stiff competition and foul play from one of the racers during the debut race, but she overtakes the pack, claiming victory. After the race, the Trainer encounters Team Rigil's trainer Hana Toujou, who reminds him to keep an eye on Silence Suzuka.
3	3	"First Big Win"; Transliteration: "Hajimete no Ō Ichiban" (Japanese: 初めての大一番)	Tomoaki Ōta	Masafumi Sugiura	Kei Oikawa	April 9, 2018
The members of Team Spica win their races, while the Trainer instructs them to improve their Winning Live Concert performances with the help of Tokai Teio. Afterwards, the Trainer enters Special Week to the Yayoi Sho to qualify for the Triple Crown and wins, narrowly beating her classmates Seiun Sky and King Halo. Special Week celebrates her victory with Team Spica, during which Tokai Teio joins the team. At the Satsuki Shō, Special Week is given her signature racewear. Special Week follows the same strategy as the Yayoi Sho, only to lose when Seiun Sky predicts her tactic and starts her spurt earlier to win. Special Week becomes frustrated at her first major loss but is consoled by the Trainer, who acknowledges his failure to train her better and encourages Special Week to prepare for the Japanese Derby.
4	4	"Special Training!"; Transliteration: "Tokkun Desu!" (Japanese: 特訓ですっ！)	Yuriko Abe	Yōko Yonaiyama	Sōichi Masui	April 16, 2018
Despite the Trainer's encouragement, Special Week enters a slump as she continues reeling from her loss in the Satsuki Shō. Special Week goes on special training sessions with Team Spica to regain her performance. After planning Silence Suzuka's upcoming races, the Trainer also works with Hana to organize a mock race between Special Week and Team Rigil's Taiki Shuttle. Special Week learns valuable tactics from Taiki Shuttle during the mock race, such as slip-streaming and short-stride running. Although she narrowly loses the mock race, Special Week regains her confidence, and she earnestly responds to the challenge of Team Rigil member and classmate El Condor Pasa to race in the Japanese Derby against Seiun Sky.
5	5	"The Derby With Rivals"; Transliteration: "Raibaru to no Dābī" (Japanese: ライバルとのダービー)	Jong Heo	Masafumi Sugiura	Kei Oikawa	April 23, 2018
Special Week, El Condor Pasa and Seiun Sky train and prepare for the Japanese Derby. As part of her training, Special Week improves on her short-stride running with the Trainer and Silence Suzuka. Gold Ship and Tokai Teio also persuade a hesitant Mejiro McQueen to join Team Spica, and they gift a four-leaf clover to Special Week for good luck. The Japanese Derby begins, and Special Week, El Condor Pasa and Seiun Sky fight for first place. Seiun Sky pulls ahead on the final stretch, only to lose momentum and be surpassed by Special Week thanks to her training. Special Week fends off an approaching El Condor Pasa, where they win the Japanese Derby together on a dead heat thanks to Team Spica's cheers.
6	6	"Autumn Skies and Horse Girls"; Transliteration: "Ten Takaku, Umamusume Moyuru Aki" (Japanese: 天高く、ウマ娘燃ゆる秋)	Shū Honma	Ryō Ikeda	Shū Honma	April 30, 2018
Special Week writes a letter to her adoptive mother on Team Spica's popularity following the Japanese Derby. Team Spica then celebrates the Fall Twinkle Series Fan Festival at Tracen and visits its various attractions. Special Week later listens into discussions on the Mainichi Okan, a race that Silence Suzuka and Team Rigil member and classmate Grass Wonder will be competing in. When Silence Suzuka reveals that she will be racing overseas upon finishing her domestic races, El Condor Pasa decides to enter as well. Silence Suzuka admits to Special Week that she is able to enjoy racing again since joining Team Spica. At the Mainichi Okan, Silence Suzuka, El Condor Pasa and Grass Wonder race against each other. El Condor Pasa and Grass Wonder try to pass Silence Suzuka to no avail, as Silence Suzuka maintains the lead and wins the Mainichi Okan.
7	7	"Promise"; Transliteration: "Yakusoku" (Japanese: 約束)	Yasuo Fujii	Masafumi Sugiura	Kenichi Imaizumi	May 7, 2018
Silence Suzuka consoles Special Week after losing the Kikuka-shō to Seiun Sky, as she expounds on her wish to race with her in the Japan Cup before leaving for America. Special Week asks the Trainer to grant Silence Suzuka's wish, which the Trainer approves on the condition that Silence Suzuka wins the upcoming Fall Tenno Sho. At the race, various racers and members of Team Rigil duel against Silence Suzuka, who sprints ahead and widens the distance. As the pack approaches the final stretch, Silence Suzuka suffers a serious leg fracture, prompting a distraught Special Week and the Trainer to rush her to hospital to prevent her injury from worsening. Special Week and Team Spica comfort Silence Suzuka and pray for her swift recovery so that she can fulfill her wish with Special Week.
8	8	"For You"; Transliteration: "Anata no Tame ni" (Japanese: あなたの為に)	Tomoaki Ōta	Yōko Yonaiyama	Kei Oikawa	May 14, 2018
Special Week races in the Japan Cup without Silence Suzuka though she loses to El Condor Pasa, while Silence Suzuka undergoes rehabilitation to run again. The two attend Team Spica's New Year's party, and they aspire to race in the Dream Trophy after watching it. Silence Suzuka eventually returns to training, with Team Spica and members of Team Rigil cheering her on. However, Special Week sacrifices her own training to aid Silence Suzuka, causing her to perform poorly in the Takarazuka Kinen against Grass Wonder. Grass Wonder questions Special Week on whether she gave it her all during the race, as the Trainer later pointedly tells Special Week she was distracted about Silence Suzuka. The Trainer then reminds Special Week of her original goal and directs her to win every race in the fall.
9	9	"Dreams of Spica"; Transliteration: "Supika no Yume" (Japanese: スピカの夢)	Ken'ichi Imaizumi	Masafumi Sugiura	Kenichi Imaizumi	May 21, 2018
Team Spica and the Trainer head to summer training camp to get back to shape. He also splits them into two teams, separating a dour Special Week and Silence Suzuka from each other. During training, Special Week and Silence Suzuka fail to train efficiently due to them being clouded by doubts, worrying their teammates. The Trainer organizes a triathlon to push both teams to their best, but Special Week and Silence Suzuka fall behind. Observing this, the Trainer urges Special Week and Silence Suzuka to motivate each other as rivals, allowing both girls to run at their full potential. After the triathlon, Team Spica joins Team Rigil to watch El Condor Pasa race in the Prix de l'Arc de Triomphe against French Umamusume Broye. El Condor Pasa maintains the lead and almost wins, only for Broye to pass her at the homestretch and narrowly claim victory. After hearing El Condor Pasa cry from her defeat, Special Week is determined to continue training with Silence Suzuka.
10	10	"No Matter How Many Times I Lose"; Transliteration: "Nando Makete mo" (Japanese: 何度負けても)	Mitsutaka Noshitani	Ryō Ikeda	Akira Takamura	May 28, 2018
Team Spica works towards their goal of the Dream Trophy, but when Special Week loses the Kyoto Daishoten after overtraining herself, the Trainer orders Team Spica to rest. He requests Special Week to head home to Hokkaido, where she reunites with her adoptive mother and is advised to not run during her break. Although initially dismayed, Special Week learns her adoptive mother has been commemorating Special Week's letters and achievements in her late biological mother's altar and gifts her a horseshoe containing an inscription of her dream, revitalizing Special Week. Returning to Tokyo, she rejoins an improved Team Spica and efficiently trains with her teammates. Special Week races at the Fall Tenno Sho against Seiun Sky and King Halo and wins thanks to her training and rest.
11	11	"Welcome Back!"; Transliteration: "Okaerinasai!" (Japanese: おかえりなさい！)	Shū Honma	Yōko Yonaiyama	Shū Honma	June 4, 2018
Silence Suzuka prepares for her comeback race at the Open Special. At the same time, Broye arrives in Tokyo with the intent to race in the Japan Cup against Special Week. These events prompt Special Week and Silence Suzuka to train hard for their respective races with support from their friends. While Special Week continues to train for the Japan Cup, the Open Special commences with Broye observing the race. Amid concerns of a repeat of her Fall Tenno Sho injury, Silence Suzuka trails behind the pack and struggles to gain positions. As they approach the homestretch, Silence Suzuka begins her spurt to pass the entire pack and win the Open Special, leaving everyone relieved and grateful for Silence Suzuka's return to racing.
12	12	"Stage of Dreams"; Transliteration: "Yume no Butai" (Japanese: 夢の舞台)	Akira Takamura & Yuriko Abe	Ryō Ikeda	Kenichi Imaizumi	June 11, 2018
Silence Suzuka's victory fires up Broye for the upcoming Japan Cup. The next day, Special Week's adoptive mother comes to Tokyo to watch her race. Special Week meets her friends who give her the motivation to win the Japan Cup. Special Week and Broye bid each other good luck before entering the racetrack. The Japan Cup begins, and Special Week paces to the back of the pack, with Broye trailing her. Arriving at the final stretch, Special Week starts her spurt and gains positions, and Broye follows suit. Broye and Special Week duel, where Special Week maintains her lead against Broye and wins the Japan Cup, fulfilling her dream of becoming the best Umamusume in Japan. Special Week later proclaims on her desire to carry and realize the audience's dreams before performing her Winning Live Concert.
13	Extra	"Echo, Fanfare!"; Transliteration: "Hibike, Fanfāre!" (Japanese: 響け、ファンファーレ！)	Tomoaki Ōta, Kei Oikawa, Jong Heo, Shū Honma, Ken'ichi Imaizumi & Yuriko Abe	Masafumi Sugiura	Kei Oikawa	June 18, 2018
Sometime after Special Week's victory in the Japan Cup, Special Week writes to her adoptive mother on the recent successes of Team Spica. She then picks up Silence Suzuka from the airport, who has come back from America for the Dream Trophy and aspires to fulfill her wish. Special Week and Silence Suzuka later join Team Spica, Team Rigil, and other select Umamusume for the ceremony and barrier draw of the Dream Trophy, during which the Trainer recounts to Hana how he formed Team Spica from the brink of disbandment. A few days after the barrier draw, the entrants race in the Dream Trophy and perform together in the Winning Live Concert after all simultaneously cross the finish line.
Extra	Extra (OVA1)	"BNW's Oath ①"; Transliteration: "Bī Enu Daburyū no Chikai ①" (Japanese: BNWの誓い①)	Tomoaki Ōta	Masafumi Sugiura	Kei Oikawa	December 19, 2018
Team Spica supervises school festival preparations at Tracen when they hear about Team BNW, a group consisting of Biwa Hayahide, Narita Taishin, and Winning Ticket. The student council tasks Team Spica to invite Team BNW to sponsor a relay race. Biwa Hayahide agrees to join, but Narita Taishin and Winning Ticket refuse. Biwa Hayahide later explains to Team Spica that Team BNW has not been on speaking terms since losing a recent race. Team Spica consults with Silence Suzuka, who posits that Team BNW might be believing they are holding each other back. Hearing this, Team Spica convinces Winning Ticket to join to prove her worth to Biwa Hayahide, which she agrees.
Extra	Extra (OVA2)	"BNW's Oath ②"; Transliteration: "Bī Enu Daburyū no Chikai ②" (Japanese: BNWの誓い②)	Hiroki Hirano	Masafumi Sugiura	Kei Oikawa	December 19, 2018
Tracen begins promoting the relay race, as Daiwa Scarlet, who is unable to join after an injury, inspects Biwa Hayahide and Winning Ticket's teams. Daiwa Scarlet checks on Narita Taishin's team, only to find out that Narita Taishin herself is not present. Daiwa Scarlet tries convincing Narita Taishin to join to no avail, and Narita Taishin expresses wanting to retire. Daiwa Scarlet shares her concerns to Biwa Hayahide and Winning Ticket, worrying them. Hearing this, Biwa Hayahide's sister Narita Brian meets with Narita Taishin and recounts her perseverance to win after multiple losses, hoping it can help Narita Taishin reconsider. At the relay race, Narita Taishin watches it unfold and sees Biwa Hayahide and Winning Ticket wishing her to join in, motivating her to run to the event.
Extra	Extra (OVA3)	"BNW's Oath ③"; Transliteration: "Bī Enu Daburyū no Chikai ③" (Japanese: BNWの誓い③)	Shū Honma	Masafumi Sugiura	Kei Oikawa & Shū Honma	December 19, 2018
The teams of Biwa Hayahide, Narita Taishin, and Winning Ticket race fiercely, as Narita Taishin reunites with her teammates in time. However, Biwa Hayahide becomes debilitated by a fever and is forced to back out. Narita Brian rushes to be Biwa Hayahide's substitute, and she races against Narita Taishin and Winning Ticket, much to the crowd's excitement. All the team leaders finish the race, though none of them win due to disqualifications from Team Spica's antics. Despite the anticlimactic outcome, Tracen encourages the audience to watch Team BNW perform in the future, as Team BNW reconciles. At a future race, Team BNW proudly races against each other again.

==== Season 2 (2021) ====
No. overall	No. in season	Title	Directed by	Written by	Storyboarded by	Original release date
14	1	"Tokai Teio"; Transliteration: "Tōkai Teiō" (Japanese: トウカイテイオー)	Takumi Narita	Masafumi Sugiura	Kei Oikawa	January 5, 2021
In a flashback, a young Tokai Teio sees the undefeated Symboli Rudolf win the Japanese Derby and extend her streak. Tokai Teio asks her during a press conference on how she can emulate her. Symboli Rudolf and Maruzensky suggest she enroll at Tracen to develop her talents through effort and luck. In the present, Tokai Teio maintains an undefeated winning streak and trains for the Japanese Derby as part of achieving the Triple Crown like Symboli Rudolf. After helping out young Umamusume at Tracen's open campus day with Team Spica, Tokai Teio races in the Japanese Derby. Tokai Teio begins her spurt towards the final stretch, pulling away from the pack to win. Tokai Teio performs her Winning Live Concert, but Symboli Rudolf and the Trainer worryingly notice her leg shaking during the performance.
15	2	"Never Gonna Give It Up!"; Transliteration: "Yuzurenai kara!" (Japanese: 譲れないから！)	Taisuke Tsukuda	Yōko Yonaiyama	Kei Oikawa	January 12, 2021
Tokai Teio and the Trainer learn from a doctor that she suffered a leg fracture and will not race until the next spring. Despite being advised on making a full recovery, Tokai Teio is determined to race in the Kikuka-shō, prompting the Trainer to develop a regimen to support her endeavors. Tokai Teio trains for the Kikuka-shō with Team Spica and gradually runs again, but realizes she will not recover in time. She reluctantly pulls out of the Kikuka-shō, voiding her chance to achieve the Triple Crown. Tokai Teio and the Trainer visit the race, where she wistfully imagines how she would have won the Kikuka-shō and sees the racers striving to become better. Tokai Teio reorients her goal to remain undefeated, which the Trainer aims to fulfill.
16	3	"Meetings"; Transliteration: "Deai" (Japanese: 出会い)	Shigatsu Yoshikawa	Ryō Ikeda	Takumi Narita	January 19, 2021
Team Spica celebrates New Year's and prays for good luck, with Tokai Teio reiterating her revised goal and Mejiro McQueen setting her sights to win the Spring Tenno Sho for the second time. Tokai Teio and Mejiro McQueen are selected for accolades, and the Trainer advises them on facing stronger opponents. Tokai Teio also decides to race in the Spring Tenno Sho, as she and Mejiro McQueen reminisce on their first meetings before Team Spica. Mejiro McQueen races at the Hanshin Daishoten during heavy rain to qualify for the Spring Tenno Sho. Despite being crowded around by the pack, Mejiro McQueen pulls away at the homestretch and wins. Seeing this, Tokai Teio becomes motivated to win her qualifying race at the Osaka Hai.
17	4	"TM Showdown!"; Transliteration: "Tī Emu Taiketsu!" (Japanese: TM対決！)	Tomoaki Ōta	Masafumi Sugiura	Katsumi Ono	January 26, 2021
Tokai Teio makes her comeback at the Osaka Hai and wins, building up excitement for her upcoming duel with Mejiro McQueen at the Spring Tenno Sho. The Trainer also develops separate training sessions for Tokai Teio and Mejiro McQueen upon acknowledging the circumstances, with Team Spica assisting both racers. While training, Team Spica watches the Satsuki Shō, where they find undefeated Umamusume Mihono Bourbon win the race. Tokai Teio and Mejiro McQueen become determined to train harder. In the lead-up to their duel, Tokai Teio admits to Symboli Rudolf on her slim chances at winning the long-distance Spring Tenno Sho, but expresses eagerness to the challenge. Meanwhile, Mejiro McQueen privately expresses frustration at the press and audience favoring Tokai Teio over her, giving her the drive to not lose against Tokai Teio.
18	5	"Unbeaten Champion"; Transliteration: "Muhai to Renpa" (Japanese: 無敗と連覇)	Arata Nishizuki	Masafumi Sugiura	Kei Oikawa & Takumi Narita	February 2, 2021
Discussions are being made whether Tokai Teio or Mejiro McQueen will win the Spring Tenno Sho, as both racers reach their full potential thanks to the Trainer's guidance. The Trainer then wonders how the race will play out for Tokai Teio and Mejiro McQueen, noting that Mejiro McQueen has the advantage over its long distance. On the day of the race, Tokai Teio and Mejiro McQueen bid each other good luck before entering the racetrack. The Spring Tenno Sho begins after a short delay, and Tokai Teio and Mejiro McQueen duel for first place. Despite training hard, Tokai Teio fails to overtake Mejiro McQueen and falls behind at the homestretch, allowing Mejiro McQueen to win. Tokai Teio congratulates Mejiro McQueen, gracefully accepting that she lost.
19	6	"Searching for a Reason"; Transliteration: "Nan no Tame ni" (Japanese: なんのために)	Shū Honma	Yōko Yonaiyama	Tomoyuki Yunehiro	February 9, 2021
After suffering a second leg fracture following the race, Tokai Teio becomes aimless upon failing to achieve the Triple Crown and remain undefeated. Tokai Teio also learns that Mejiro McQueen is undergoing rehabilitation from injuries sustained in the race. As Tokai Teio continues resting, she sees numerous Umamusume distinguish themselves, like Mejiro Palmer winning at the Takarazuka Kinen and Arima Kinen, and Rice Shower defeating Mihono Bourbon at the Kikuka-shō. After Tokai Teio struggles to win her races by the following year, the Trainer sends her to a sanatorium owned by the Mejiro family as a way to find her purpose, where she reunites with Mejiro McQueen. Upon asking her reason to keep going despite winning the Spring Tenno Sho, Mejiro McQueen reveals she wants to race against Tokai Teio as her rival once more, renewing Tokai Teio's purpose to race.
20	7	"A Blessed Name"; Transliteration: "Shukufuku no Namae" (Japanese: 祝福の名前)	Daisuke Tsukushi & Daiki Iida	Ryō Ikeda	Kei Oikawa & Takumi Narita	February 16, 2021
Mejiro McQueen returns to racing and prepares to secure a third consecutive win at the Spring Tenno Sho, though she is advised to watch out for Rice Shower. However, Rice Shower hesitates on running in the race against Mejiro McQueen. Tokai Teio and Team Spica ask Rice Shower on her reasons, learning that she fears of souring public opinion again after denying Mihono Bourbon the Triple Crown at the Kikuka-shō. Tokai Teio enlists Mihono Bourbon's help, and they try to convince Rice Shower to run in the race, but Rice Shower vehemently refuses. After hearing Mihono Bourbon and various racers compliment her skills and address her as a worthy opponent, Rice Shower decides to run in the Spring Tenno Sho.
21	8	"A Small Wish"; Transliteration: "Sasayaka na Inori" (Japanese: ささやかな祈り)	Taisuke Tsukuda	Masafumi Sugiura	Kei Oikawa	February 23, 2021
Mejiro McQueen takes Rice Shower's offer in stride, and they both train for the Spring Tenno Sho. Rice Shower then begins training alone to mentally strengthen herself. On the day of the Spring Tenno Sho, the audience highly anticipates Mejiro McQueen's victory, as Mejiro McQueen nervously finds a determined Rice Shower before entering the racetrack. The race begins, and the Trainer suspects Mejiro McQueen is wary about Rice Shower. Upon approaching the final stretch, Mejiro McQueen gains first place from Mejiro Palmer, only for Rice Shower to overtake her and win. Rice Shower's victory is met with dismay, though Mejiro McQueen and Mihono Bourbon applaud her, leaving her in tears. Tokai Teio overhears Mejiro McQueen admitting she was less focused on victory than Rice Shower and promises to win at the Takarazuka Kinen, moving Tokai Teio.
22	9	"Stopwatch"; Transliteration: "Sutoppuwotchi" (Japanese: ストップウオッチ)	Tomoaki Ōta	Yōko Yonaiyama	Kei Oikawa & Shigatsu Yoshikawa	March 2, 2021
Tokai Teio also decides to run in the Takarazuka Kinen as her full return to racing and trains hard with Mejiro McQueen. Tokai Teio later opens up to Symboli Rudolf on her renewed passion to race thanks to Mejiro McQueen's support. During training, however, Tokai Teio suffers a serious leg fracture; her doctor remarks that as it is her third injury, it may irrevocably alter her running potential when she recovers. Tokai Teio tries to keep her head up high after Mejiro McQueen wins the Takarazuka Kinen in her absence, but she begins fearing that she will be left behind. Team Spica and the Trainer do all they can to cheer up Tokai Teio. Despite their efforts, Tokai Teio tearfully accepts she will no longer be able to run at her full potential again upon seeing Mejiro McQueen's run.
23	10	"One Day, Without a Doubt"; Transliteration: "Kanarazu, Kitto" (Japanese: 必ず、きっと)	Ayataka Tanemura	Yōko Yonaiyama & Shingo Nagai	Ayataka Tanemura	March 9, 2021
Tokai Teio, seeing no more reason to keep racing, tells the Trainer and Symboli Rudolf of her plans to quit from Team Spica. The Trainer hesitantly accepts her wishes and suggests she hold a farewell concert at an upcoming fan festival in Tracen. Team Spica and Symboli Rudolf help in setting up the concert, while Tokai Teio practices with her healed leg. At the concert, Tokai Teio instead finds the Trainer, Team Spica, and a large group of her fans passionately wishing for her return, as Team Canopus, a team who regards Tokai Teio as a role model and rival, broadcasts a race won by Twin Turbo for her. Moved by the amount of support, Tokai Teio promises to try again and make a full recovery.
24	11	"What I Feel"; Transliteration: "Kono Kimochi tte" (Japanese: この気持ちって)	Shū Honma	Shingo Nagai	Takumi Narita	March 16, 2021
Tokai Teio trains to regain her performance, much to the Trainer's relief. Tokai Teio also observes their rivals, who have improved during her hiatus and include Mejiro Palmer, Rice Shower, Team BNW's Biwa Hayahide and Winning Ticket, and Team Canopus' Nice Nature and Matikanetannhauser. After receiving advice from Nice Nature, Tokai Teio thanks the Trainer and Team Spica for helping her, though Tokai Teio unusually struggles expressing gratitude towards Mejiro McQueen. Realizing that she treats Mejiro McQueen as a close friend whom she deeply cares about, Tokai Teio invites her to a date. Tokai Teio confesses that she regards Mejiro McQueen as someone special, thanking her for being her role model. Mejiro McQueen reveals she regards Tokai Teio the same way, deepening the bond between both girls.
25	12	"Together"; Transliteration: "Futari" (Japanese: ふたり)	Taisuke Tsukuda & Kei Oikawa	Shingo Nagai	Kenji Horikome	March 23, 2021
Mejiro McQueen undertakes solo training sessions, as Tokai Teio continues to rest and sees Biwa Hayahide dominate at the Kikuka-shō. Worried about her condition, Mejiro McQueen gets herself checked. Sometime later, Tokai Teio learns to her shock that Mejiro McQueen has gone missing after learning she developed a leg disease. Mejiro McQueen pushes herself to train despite her affliction out of a desire to fulfill her promise to Tokai Teio before collapsing in pain. Tokai Teio finds Mejiro McQueen tearfully remarking she failed. Tokai Teio adds how they are kept apart from achieving their promise together, and tells Mejiro McQueen to watch her win at the Arima Kinen to prove they can run in the face of insurmountable hardship.
26	13	"Galloping After Our Dreams"; Transliteration: "Yume o Kakeru" (Japanese: 夢をかける)	Takumi Narita, Kei Oikawa, Shigatsu Yoshikawa & Arata Nishizuki	Shingo Nagai	Kei Oikawa, Katsumi Ono & Takumi Narita	March 30, 2021
Despite not racing for a year and facing stiff competition, Tokai Teio insists on running in the Arima Kinen to fulfill her promise to Mejiro McQueen. The Trainer and Team Spica, moved by her determination, train Tokai Teio. Symboli Rudolf visits Tokai Teio and gives her motivation to race towards what she believes in. Mejiro McQueen travels to the racetrack just as the Arima Kinen begins, and Tokai Teio feels her rivals' determination to win. Against all odds, Tokai Teio surges past Biwa Hayahide at the homestretch and wins an unprecedented victory to the joy of everyone, especially Mejiro McQueen. Tokai Teio triumphantly performs her Winning Live Concert. Sometime after the Arima Kinen, a retired Tokai Teio and Mejiro McQueen fulfill their promise of racing together during training, as two Umamusume who idolized and supported them since the open campus day, Kitasan Black and Satono Diamond, follow their footsteps and enroll at Tracen.
-	ONA	"1st Anniversary Special Animation"	Kei Oikawa	Meiko Matsuno	Kei Oikawa	February 22, 2022
A seven-minute short that chronicles Kitasan Black and Satono Diamond's first day in Tracen and Kitasan Black's decision to join Team Spica.

==== Season 3 (2023) ====
No. overall	No. in season	Title	Directed by	Written by	Storyboarded by	Original release date
27	1	"The Stage Long Dreamed Of"; Transliteration: "Akogareta Keshiki" (Japanese: 憧れた景色)	Taisuke Tsukuda	Shingo Nagai	Kei Oikawa	October 5, 2023
After losing the Satsuki Shō to Duramente, Kitasan Black trains for the Japanese Derby to replicate Tokai Teio's successes. She helps out various residents within her neighborhood and reunites with Satono Diamond at Tracen, who reveals that Kitasan Black joined Team Spica. Both girls go to their training sessions, and the Trainer helps refine Kitasan Black's running for the Japanese Derby. Kitasan Black later asks Satono Diamond for advice in the upcoming race, leading the latter to remark on having self-confidence in winning. At the Japanese Derby, Kitasan Black maintains a second-place position, but she falls behind the pack by the final stretch as Duramente wins again, frustrating her.
28	2	"The Start Line"; Transliteration: "Sutātorain" (Japanese: スタートライン)	Takumi Narita	Shingo Nagai	Kei Oikawa	October 12, 2023
Having failed to emulate and reach Tokai Teio's successes, Kitasan Black becomes saddened. Kitasan Black is further disheartened when she learns that Duramente has pulled out of the Kikuka-shō after being hospitalized. Nice Nature finds her and listens to her dilemma of following Tokai Teio's footsteps, and Nice Nature reassures Kitasan Black that she should be true to herself when racing. Kitasan Black becomes motivated by her advice and continues training for the Kikuka-shō as a way to also prove herself. The determined Kitasan Black is able to win the Kikuka-shō and experiences the audience cheer for her, much to her joy.
29	3	"The Dream Never Ends"; Transliteration: "Yume wa Owaranai" (Japanese: 夢は終わらない)	Shunsuke Machiya	Tatsuto Higuchi	Shunsuke Machiya	October 19, 2023
Satono Diamond wins her debut race and Kitasan Black celebrates it with Satono Crown and Cheval Grand, as fan voting for the Arima Kinen begins. Kitasan Black is eyed as a contender for the race, which she has set as her next goal, and she meets Team Canopus' Sounds of Earth, who is another contender. She suddenly learns that Gold Ship will be retiring from the Twinkle Series, and Gold Ship further explains that she is no longer in her prime. At the Arima Kinen, Kitasan Black, Sounds of Earth and Gold Ship race to win. Gold Ship enters her spurt to claim first place, but it is insufficient as Sounds of Earth steals Kitasan Black's chance to land second place. Despite the outcome, Gold Ship remains determined to keep racing in the Dream Trophy. Gold Ship later comments that she would like to see Kitasan Black surpass her, surprising the latter.
30	4	"My Own Shine"; Transliteration: "Atashi Dake no Kagayaki" (Japanese: あたしだけの輝き)	Ōri Yasukawa	Meiko Matsuno	Munehisa Sakai	October 26, 2023
A new school year starts at Tracen, but Kitasan Black struggles with winning races. Upon learning of her durability, Nice Nature suggests she take up hard training. Kitasan Black and Satono Diamond bid each other good luck, and the former begins her hard training with the help of the Trainer, Mihono Bourbon, and Rice Shower. Kitasan Black is initially overwhelmed with the new regimen, and while she slowly improves, the regimen takes a toll on her motivation to win the Spring Tenno Sho. Mihono Bourbon reveals that the regimen tests one's mental strength, hoping that Kitasan Black can overcome it. After seeing Satono Diamond remain determined to improve despite losing the Satsuki Shō, Kitasan Black becomes motivated to continue training and later wins the Spring Tenno Sho.
31	5	"Proving Oneself"; Transliteration: "Jibun no Shōmei" (Japanese: 自分の証明)	Mizuki Sakuma	Tatsuto Higuchi	Kenji Horikome	November 2, 2023
Satono Diamond struggles in securing a victory for the Satono family following her failure to win the Japanese Derby, though she does not waver. Meanwhile, Kitasan Black remains optimistic and continues to improve, but hears Duramente has recovered and will return to race at the Takarazuka Kinen. Kitasan Black grows nervous with her return, further amplified when she talks with Duramente for the first time. Duramente reveals she aims to be the best of her generation of racers, prompting Kitasan Black to agree on defeating her. Kitasan Black faces off Duramente at the Takarazuka Kinen, only for neither of them to win first place. Duramente is left impressed with Kitasan Black's tenacity, and they promise to face each other again.
32	6	"Diamond"; Transliteration: "Daiyamondo" (Japanese: ダイヤモンド)	Taisuke Tsukuda	Kodai Minami	Kei Oikawa	November 9, 2023
Satono Diamond becomes pressured to prove she can break the superstition of the "Satono jinx" by winning the Kikuka-shō, causing her to train further. Satono Diamond also plans to take any bad luck head-on to strengthen herself, worrying Kitasan Black. Satono Diamond recounts how she has to shoulder the frustrations of the previous Satono racers to win their first Grade 1 race, as Mejiro McQueen checks up on her and believes she can win by her own strengths. Satono Diamond is filled with determination at the Kikuka-shō, allowing her to win the race and earn the Satono family their first Grade 1 victory. Realizing this, Satono Diamond is brought to tears, and Mejiro McQueen looks on with pride.
33	7	"Our Arima Kinen"; Transliteration: "Atashitachi no Arima Kinen" (Japanese: あたしたちの有マ記念 (Note: The eponymous race is rendered as 有馬記念, but with the character for horse (馬, uma) written with two legs instead of four.))	Ōri Yasukawa	Shingo Nagai	Kei Oikawa	November 16, 2023
Kitasan Black enjoys more success, as she sets her sights in winning the Arima Kinen again. Kitasan Black and Tokai Teio hang out, and the former reveals she and Satono Diamond promised to run at the Arima Kinen after seeing Tokai Teio's miracle race. Meanwhile, Satono Diamond vows to defeat Kitasan Black at the race to show her improvement. The Arima Kinen begins, and Kitasan Black is surprised to feel Satono Diamond's focused determination as they duel for first place. Satono Diamond slightly overtakes Kitasan Black at the homestretch to win the Arima Kinen; both racers congratulate each other, though Kitasan Black is dismayed at being surpassed by Satono Diamond again.
34	8	"What's Always Been There"; Transliteration: "Zutto Atta Mono" (Japanese: ずっとあったもの)	Itatoki Sugaoka	Meiko Matsuno	Itatoki Sugaoka	November 23, 2023
Kitasan Black tries to come to terms with Satono Diamond's recent victory as another school year passes, and Satono Diamond follows Satono Crown's footsteps to race overseas and win glory for Japan. Kitasan Black notices how similar Satono Diamond and Duramente are in pursuing greater goals. She later talks to Duramente, who is recovering from an injury sustained during the Takarazuka Kinen, as the latter asks her reason for running, leaving Kitasan Black unable to respond. Kitasan Black seeks Tokai Teio for advice, and Tokai Teio opens up how she was able to persevere in spite of failing her initial goals thanks to the people who supported her. Kitasan Black realizes she does have people who support her in the form of the neighborhood she repeatedly lends a helping hand to. Warmed by their gratitude, Kitasan Black finds a renewed reason to race.
35	9	"Pushed by the Approaching Heat"; Transliteration: "Semaru Netsu ni Osarete" (Japanese: 迫る熱に押されて)	Fumiaki Kouta	Tatsuto Higuchi	Fumiaki Kouta	November 30, 2023
Kitasan Black and Satono Diamond win several races, and both are poised to race in the next Spring Tenno Sho. Meanwhile, Kitasan Black invites Satono Diamond on a trip to Izumo and enjoy each other's company during the journey. After traveling to a view deck overlooking the sea, Kitasan Black promises she will defeat Satono Diamond at the Spring Tenno Sho to make the people who support her proud, and Satono Diamond eagerly accepts the rematch. Both girls then duel at the Spring Tenno Sho, with Satono Diamond trailing behind Kitasan Black. Kitasan Black gains the lead at the final stretch, while Satono Diamond and Cheval Grand catch up to her. Despite their efforts, they fail to close the distance as Kitasan Black wins. Satono Diamond congratulates her, as Kitasan Black aims to work with her to bring excitement to people.
36	10	"Festival"; Transliteration: "O matsuri" (Japanese: お祭り)	Shunsuke Machiya	Shingo Nagai	Shunsuke Machiya	December 7, 2023
Kitasan Black is requested by Tracen's student council to lead the committee for the school's upcoming festival with her neighborhood, which she enthusiastically accepts. Kitasan Black also takes the time to check up on her friends. After reminiscing on her race record, Kitasan Black plans to win the Takarazuka Kinen and follow Satono Diamond and Duramente's footsteps to race overseas in the Prix de l'Arc de Triomphe. She begins training to her full potential for the race which worries the Trainer. At the Takarazuka Kinen, Kitasan Black races against Cheval Grand and Satono Crown for first place. Kitasan Black fails to enter her spurt and reach a podium position as Satono Crown surges ahead and wins. Team Spica and some audience members then notice the energetic Kitasan Black being unusually out of breath.
37	11	"Decision"; Transliteration: "Ketsui" (Japanese: 決意)	Takaharu Ōkuma	Tatsuto Higuchi	Kei Oikawa	December 14, 2023
As Satono Diamond flies to France for the Prix de l'Arc de Triomphe, Kitasan Black wonders on her sudden loss. She tries throwing herself back into training to no avail. Gold Ship catches on to Kitasan Black's dilemma, remarking she is now past her prime as a racer. Kitasan Black asks the Trainer if she can be able to race again, though the Trainer is uncertain. After seeing her neighborhood still wanting to support her beyond the Prix de l'Arc de Triomphe, Kitasan Black decides to race domestically with the remaining time she has left. She trains enough to participate in the Fall Tenno Sho during heavy rain. Kitasan Black races doggedly and wins, narrowly beating Satono Crown before collapsing from exhaustion.
38	12	"Kitasan Black"; Transliteration: "Kitasan Burakku" (Japanese: キタサンブラック)	Ōri Yasukawa	Kodai Minami	Kei Oikawa	December 21, 2023
Kitasan Black announces her plans to retire from the Twinkle Series after the Japan Cup and Arima Kinen, shocking everyone. She then continues training for her remaining races, as her friends and rivals look back at Kitasan Black's charisma. Cheval Grand, following advice from Vivlos and Verxina, vows to defeat Kitasan Black before she retires to gain her first Grade 1 victory. Kitasan Black and Cheval Grand face off in the Japan Cup, and Cheval Grand recounts her jealousy and admiration towards her. Cheval Grand overtakes Kitasan Black and wins the Japan Cup, with Kitasan Black congratulating her. Later, Kitasan Black tells Satono Diamond, who lost the Prix de l'Arc de Triomphe, the bittersweet feeling for her final race.
39	13	"And Yours..."; Transliteration: "Soshite Anata no......" (Japanese: そしてあなたの......)	Shunsuke Machiya & Taisuke Tsukuda	Shingo Nagai	Kei Oikawa	December 28, 2023
Kitasan Black intensely trains for the Arima Kinen to leave a lasting mark on her legacy. With anticipation building up for her final race, the Trainer and Team Spica provide Kitasan Black an ornate racing outfit as a send-off. At the Arima Kinen, Kitasan Black faces off against seasoned Umamusume like Sounds of Earth, Cheval Grand, and Satono Crown, as she desperately maintains lead position throughout the race. As the pack closes in on her, Kitasan Black sees the audience cheering for her while approaching the final stretch, energizing her enough to win the Arima Kinen. Seeing this, Satono Diamond becomes inspired to continue racing to follow Kitasan Black's success, as Kitasan Black enthusiastically performs her Winning Live Concert. Sometime later, an open campus day is held at Tracen, and a retired Kitasan Black works to promote Team Spica and serve as an inspiration for future racers.

=== Umamusume: Cinderella Gray (2025) ===
No.	Title	Directed by	Storyboarded by	Original release date
Part 1
1	"Finally, a Star"; Transliteration: "Koko ni Iru" (Japanese: ここにいる)	Tetsuya Akutsu & Ryūta Kawahara	Yuuki Ito	April 6, 2025
Umamusume trainer Jo Kitahara is searching for a star that the people can put their hopes in, but has little luck in finding such a racer in the rural town of Kasamatsu. At Kasamatsu Tracen Academy, aloof Umamusume Oguri Cap enrolls as a student and befriends fellow classmate Belno Light. A clique consisting of Norn Ace, Rudy Lemono, and Mini the Lady attempt to bully Oguri Cap, though the latter remains oblivious to their efforts. During the students' practice runs, Kitahara observes Fujimasa March being favored by his fellow trainers after scoring an impressive time. Despite a late start caused by Mini the Lady and Rudy Lemono, Oguri Cap easily outruns them and scores a time close to Fujimasa March's record. Kitahara witnesses Oguri Cap's run and becomes certain she is the racer he is looking for, prompting him to ask her to join his team.
2	"Let Me Race"; Transliteration: "Watashi o Rēsu ni Dashite" (Japanese: 私をレースに出して)	Kenta Hayashi	Takashi Sakuma	April 13, 2025
Kitahara tells Oguri Cap that he intends to have her win the Tokai Derby. Both Oguri Cap and Belno Light join Kitahara's team, and he immediately has them prepare for Oguri Cap's debut race. Belno Light asks Oguri Cap why she runs, and the latter explains that she was born with weak knees but was able to walk thanks to her mother's care, adding her ability to run is a miracle. Oguri Cap is also gifted a hair ornament her mother used to wear in her racing days. Kitahara is shocked to see Fujimasa March also participating in the debut race, but he gives Oguri Cap a tip to leverage her superior strength. The race begins and Fujimasa March enjoys an early lead, only to see Oguri Cap rapidly catching up on the homestretch.
3	"View from the Top"; Transliteration: "Itadaki no Keshiki" (Japanese: 頂の景色)	Takashi Narikawa	Yuuki Ito, Tetsuya Akutsu & Takashi Sakuma	April 20, 2025
Oguri Cap narrowly loses to Fujimasa March after her shoes fall apart from overuse. Despite winning, Fujimasa March becomes shaken by Oguri Cap's drive. Belno Light helps Oguri Cap buy a pair of sturdier shoes to account for her greater strength, which Oguri Cap appreciates. At Oguri Cap's next race, Norn Ace contemplates on purposely sabotaging her run, but she fails to execute it upon witnessing Oguri Cap's power. Norn Ace eventually comes to respect Oguri Cap and befriends her. During training, Oguri Cap runs into Fujimasa March, who tells her of her dream to win the Tokai Derby. Oguri Cap contemplates Fujimasa March's determination and wonders what her own goals should be. Oguri Cap and Fujimasa March then prepare to face off again at the Junior Crown, while Twinkle Series racer Tamamo Cross decides to observe the race on a whim.
4	"The Junior Crown"; Transliteration: "Junia Kuraun" (Japanese: ジュニアクラウン)	Takehiro Shimizu	Takehiro Shimizu	April 27, 2025
At the Junior Crown, Kitahara's team encounters his uncle and national trainer Ginjirou Musaka, and they observe the race. Fujimasa March secures a commanding lead, with Oguri Cap trailing behind even after both enter their final spurt. Fujimasa March believes her victory is inevitable until Oguri Cap achieves an unprecedented second spurt to gain the lead and win. Oguri Cap then approaches a defeated Fujimasa March and promises a rematch in the Tokai Derby, to which she agrees. Tamamo Cross watches from a distance and regards Oguri Cap as a potential rival before leaving. Kitahara sets Oguri Cap's next race at the Chukyo Hai, but Musaka cryptically warns him to avoid that race if he aims for the Tokai Derby. In Tokyo, Tracen Academy student council president Symboli Rudolf scouts for new talent across Japan with Maruzensky to revitalize the Twinkle Series, and they decide on Chukyo as their next destination to continue their search.
5	"What's Best for Her"; Transliteration: "Ichiban no Sentaku" (Japanese: 一番の選択)	Kazuki Horiguchi	Kazuki Horiguchi	May 4, 2025
Kitahara's team heads to Chukyo, where they meet Musaka again and learn that Symboli Rudolf and Maruzensky are observing the race. As Oguri Cap wins the Chukyo Hai, Kitahara is summoned by Symboli Rudolf, who tells him her desire to scout Oguri Cap for the Twinkle Series after witnessing her strength. Kitahara is however conflicted, as moving to the Twinkle Series would allow Oguri Cap to race to her full potential at the cost of forfeiting his dream of winning the Tokai Derby, while also being unable to join her in Tokyo without a national trainer's license. Oguri Cap remains committed to run the Tokai Derby to fulfill her promise to both Kitahara and Fujimasa March. Unable to make a decision, Kitahara instead issues an ultimatum: win the upcoming Gold Junior race and move to the Twinkle Series, or lose and continue on to the Tokai Derby.
6	"The Beast"; Transliteration: "Kaibutsu" (Japanese: 怪物)	Takehiro Miura & Haruka Hirota	Takehiro Miura	May 11, 2025
Symboli Rudolf criticizes Kitahara's ultimatum as self-centered and inconsiderate of Oguri Cap's feelings. On the day of the Gold Junior race, rumors of Oguri Cap's potential transfer spread, angering Fujimasa March upon believing Oguri Cap is disregarding their rivalry and breaking her promise. Oguri Cap remains conflicted with the ultimatum, resulting in her not putting her full effort during the race. Realizing his mistake in selfishly trying to avoid making a decision himself, Kitahara yells at Oguri Cap to follow her heart and run, motivating her to win against Fujimasa March. Oguri Cap's Kasamatsu fans are reluctant to see her leave for the Twinkle Series, but Kitahara gives a heartfelt speech asking the fans to keep supporting her. Oguri Cap then bids farewell to her friends while Kitahara decides to obtain his national trainer's license so he can reunite with her.
7	"Tracen Academy"; Transliteration: "Toresen Gakuen" (Japanese: トレセン学園)	Yūsuke Kurinishi	Ryūta Kawahara	May 18, 2025
Oguri Cap and Belno Light transfer to Tokyo Tracen Academy under the temporary care of Musaka and are welcomed by Symboli Rudolf. Oguri Cap aspires to race in the Japanese Derby to provide Kitahara a win in place of the Tokai Derby, but finds to her dismay that she cannot participate in the Classics upon missing its deadline. After unsuccessfully asking for Symboli Rudolf's help, Oguri Cap is determined to win her future races to prove she belongs in the Japanese Derby. Musaka enters Oguri Cap into the Pegasus Stakes so she can get her first Twinkle Series win, while warning of her more experienced competition. Musaka also gives Oguri Cap special training on how to counter the other racers blocking her from gaining an advantageous position. On the day of the Pegasus Stakes, Oguri Cap gets excited at the thought of running in her first Twinkle Series race.
8	"The Right Stuff"; Transliteration: "Tadashiki Shishitsu" (Japanese: 正しき資質)	Hidetoshi Watanabe	Shoko Shiga	May 25, 2025
Despite being blocked by the other racers, Oguri Cap uses Musaka's advice to bypass the pack and win the Pegasus Stakes, removing any remaining doubt on her capabilities. Oguri Cap and fellow classmate Yaeno Muteki later race in the Mainichi Hai, where Yaeno Muteki positions herself to force Oguri Cap to expend more energy. However, Yaeno Muteki underestimates Oguri Cap's superior stamina, allowing the latter to surge ahead and beat her. Yaeno Muteki is disappointed that she has been locked out of the Classics, but a last-minute change allows her to advance to the Satsuki Shō and win. The outcome causes the public to rally for Oguri Cap's participation in the Japanese Derby, which is further sensationalized by journalist Sensuke Fujii. Symboli Rudolf summons Fujii, who proposes she use her position to grant the public's wishes directly to the URA Council.
9	"The Japanese Derby"; Transliteration: "Nippon Dābī" (Japanese: 日本ダービー)	Motomasa Maeda	Tetsuya Akutsu	June 1, 2025
Symboli Rudolf petitions to the URA Council on allowing Oguri Cap to race in the Japanese Derby following Fujii's request and after Maruzensky recounts her inability to participate in the race as well. Despite her efforts, the Council refuses to grant her petition, citing its violation to their code of fairness. However, the Council promises to reform the rules to ensure individuals like Oguri Cap will not be left behind. Symboli Rudolf is left to imagine how Oguri Cap would have won the Japanese Derby, as she observes Oguri Cap's classmate and Maruzensky's protégé Sakura Chiyono O win against Yaeno Muteki. Elsewhere, Oguri Cap wins the New Zealand Trophy, and is determined to keep racing to prove herself.
10	"The Top"; Transliteration: "Saikyō" (Japanese: 最強)	Yorihiro Tanimoto	Yuki Ishimatsu	June 8, 2025
Seeing that Oguri Cap lacks a goal following her failure to race in the Japanese Derby, Musaka takes her to the Takarazuka Kinen. Oguri Cap sees Tamamo Cross win and continue her dominance over the Twinkle Series, motivating Oguri Cap to set a new goal by surpassing her. Oguri Cap has a phone call with Fujimasa March, who is losing her drive to race following her defeat at the Tokai Derby. Oguri Cap tells Fujimasa March of her promise to keep racing longer than herself, as Oguri Cap later wins the Takamatsunomiya Hai. Tamamo Cross hears about Oguri Cap's winning streak and asks her trainer Masami Komiyama to get her into the same race as Oguri Cap. Musaka instructs Oguri Cap and Belno Light to take a day off and travel around Tokyo, where they encounter Fujii, who leaks information about their competition in the upcoming Mainichi Okan.
11	"The Star of Kasamatsu"; Transliteration: "Kasamatsu no Hoshi" (Japanese: カサマツの星)	Yuki Morishita	Yuki Morishita	June 15, 2025
As Oguri Cap prepares for the Mainichi Okan and meets her competition, Musaka warns her that due to her fame, the other racers are likely to team up to deny her any favorable position. Musaka's concerns are proven true as during the race, the other racers actively block Oguri Cap's attempts to move ahead. Oguri Cap resorts to bypassing the pack as she had done in the Pegasus Stakes and gain victory, qualifying her to compete in the Fall Tenno Sho. During practice, Kitahara pays a visit to check up on Oguri Cap as well as deliver gifts from her friends in Kasamatsu. In the lead-up to the Fall Tenno Sho, Oguri Cap is gifted her signature racewear by Musaka since it will be her first Grade 1 race. At a press conference for the Fall Tenno Sho, an excited Oguri Cap and Tamamo Cross meet in person for the first time.
12	"The Fall Tenno Sho"; Transliteration: "Tennōshō (Aki)" (Japanese: 天皇賞（秋）)	migmi	Takashi Sakuma	June 22, 2025
In a flashback, a young Tamamo Cross and her mother search for a place to live in Kasamatsu but are unable to find any vacant housing, as Oguri Cap's mother looks on. In the present, Musaka coaches Oguri Cap, warning that Tamamo Cross hangs near the end of the pack following an incident on her debut race, though Tamamo Cross plans for an alternative. The Fall Tenno Sho commences, and Tamamo Cross surprises Komiyama, Musaka, the audience, and the other racers by maintaining her position in the middle of the pack instead. She overtakes the lead racer upon approaching the final stretch, just as Oguri Cap begins her spurt to catch up to Tamamo Cross.
13	"Japan's Best"; Transliteration: "Nippon Ichi" (Japanese: 日本ー)	Takudai Kakuchi & Daisuke Tsukushi	Takudai Kakuchi	June 29, 2025
Oguri Cap and Tamamo Cross duel at the homestretch, and Tamamo Cross gradually runs out of stamina. After recalling her promise to her ailing elderly trainer of becoming the fastest racer, Tamamo Cross pushes past her limits and enters "the Zone", a temporary state where an exceptional Umamusume gains a massive surge of power. Tamamo Cross maintains the lead and wins the Fall Tenno Sho, leaving a stunned Oguri Cap in second. Tamamo Cross regards Oguri Cap as her rival and equal, motivating Oguri Cap to try to beat Tamamo Cross again and they both agree to face off in the future. Meanwhile, at Santa Anita Park, an American trainer suggests to his racer that she participate in the upcoming Japan Cup.
Part 2
14	"Another Peak to Climb"; Transliteration: "Aratana Yama" (Japanese: 新たな山)	Shōgo Ono	Shōgo Ono & Tetsuya Miyanishi	October 5, 2025
In a flashback following her phone call with Oguri Cap, Fujimasa March decides to run in the Gifu Okan Sho, which occurs simultaneously with Oguri Cap's race in the Takamatsunomiya Hai. Fujimasa March is then confronted by Tokai Derby winner Yamano Thousand, who believes her obsession with Oguri Cap has made her weak. Fujimasa March and Yamano Thousand duel at the Gifu Okan Sho, but recalling Oguri Cap's promise, Fujimasa March runs ahead of Yamano Thousand to win. Fujimasa March then prays for Oguri Cap's continued success in the Twinkle Series. In the present, Musaka decides to improve Oguri Cap's stamina upon reviewing her performance in the Fall Tenno Sho, as Oguri Cap aims for the Japan Cup and Arima Kinen to best Tamamo Cross. Oguri Cap's classmates intensify their training as well while a new trainer arrives at Tracen.
15	"Our Story"; Transliteration: "Bokutachi no Monogatari" (Japanese: 僕達の物語)	Yūsuke Kurinishi	Yūsuke Kurinishi	October 12, 2025
Prodigal trainer Fumino Nase introduces the media to her star racer Super Creek, who she believes has the stamina to beat Oguri Cap. Nase also plans to run Super Creek in the Kikuka-shō despite the latter's unimpressive racing record. At the race, Super Creek faces off against Yaeno Muteki, while Oguri Cap watches. Musaka points out to Oguri Cap that a long-distance race like the Kikuka-shō is both physically and mentally fatiguing, requiring great endurance on both fronts. Super Creek runs at her full potential thanks to Nase's training and exploits an opening at the final stretch, defeating Yaeno Muteki with a massive lead. Oguri Cap learns that she needs more than just raw speed to win her future races, as foreign Umamusume Toni Bianca and Obey Your Master arrive in Tokyo for the Japan Cup.
16	"The World's Best"; Transliteration: "Sekai Reberu" (Japanese: 世界レベル)	Haruka Hirota	Kurimanjū	October 19, 2025
Fujii interviews Moonlight Lunacy, Michelle My Baby, Ellerslie Pride, and Toni Bianca upon their arrival in Tokyo and offers to share his information with Musaka, only to be bluntly rejected. Musaka instead assigns Belno Light to spy on the foreign Umamusume at an international training ground. While investigating, Belno Light notes Obey Your Master's record bearing no Grade 1 wins prior to entering the Japan Cup. Belno Light interviews Obey Your Master, but she sees through her disguise and tells her to send a challenge to Oguri Cap, whom she has been following since Kasamatsu. Meanwhile, Tamamo Cross continues her rigorous training to prove she is the best in both Japan and the world, while Oguri Cap engages in partner training with fellow contender Gold City at Musaka's behest. At her hotel room, Obey Your Master reviews her research on the other racers.
17	"The Japan Cup"; Transliteration: "Japan Kappu" (Japanese: ジャパンカップ)	Yūto Nakamura & Takashi Narikawa	Takashi Narikawa	November 2, 2025
On the day of the Japan Cup, Oguri Cap suggests to Musaka that she start at the front to gain a better chance at beating Tamamo Cross, which Musaka reluctantly accepts. As the racers enter the track, Obey Your Master attempts to unsettle Tamamo Cross. The Japan Cup begins with Oguri Cap running in the middle of the pack, while Tamamo Cross trails from behind. Oguri Cap and Tamamo Cross are suddenly rattled by the rough play tactics of the foreign racers. Tamamo Cross becomes boxed in by Moonlight Lunacy and Ellerslie Pride, forcing her to overtake them from outside. While gaining positions, Tamamo Cross sees Oguri Cap exhausting her stamina to defend herself from Michelle My Baby. Tamamo Cross enters the Zone upon reaching the final stretch to take the lead, when she is caught off-guard by Obey Your Master's approaching aura.
18	"Wild Joker"	Motomasa Maeda	Shintaro Matsui & Kengo Matsumoto	November 9, 2025
In a flashback, Obey Your Master laments her continued losses in American dirt tracks. Sensing an opportunity in the turf track of the Japan Cup, Obey Your Master masks her original personality, trains in secret, and gathers research on her rivals. In the present, Obey Your Master unleashes her true power and enters the Zone to pursue Tamamo Cross. Seeing this, Toni Bianca hastens her pace but suffers a leg injury, causing her to fall back. Obey Your Master swerves beside Tamamo Cross to avoid a duel and gain the lead. Oguri Cap attempts to catch up with her remaining stamina but fails to her frustration, and Obey Your Master wins the Japan Cup. Observing the race, Dicta Striker notes Oguri Cap was close to entering the Zone as well. Obey Your Master and Tamamo Cross acknowledge each other as worthy rivals, as each of the foreign Umamusume go their separate ways. Oguri Cap and Tamamo Cross set their sights for the Arima Kinen.
19	"A Zone Yet Unknown"; Transliteration: "Michi no "Ryōiki"" (Japanese: 未知の"領域")	Yorihiro Tanimoto & Hidetoshi Watanabe	Yorihiro Tanimoto & Hidetoshi Watanabe	November 23, 2025
Oguri Cap falls into a slump, while Tamamo Cross approaches Komiyama with a personal matter. Musaka briefs the team on the Arima Kinen, when Oguri Cap sullenly remarks she may not win upon witnessing Tamamo Cross and Obey Your Master's runs. Musaka surmises she is referring to the Zone, prompting him to train Oguri Cap at the Arima Kinen's racetrack with Kitahara's help. Oguri Cap confides in Kitahara on her anxieties of failing to defeat Tamamo Cross, but Kitahara uplifts her spirits by revealing he brought her friends from Kasamatsu as training partners. Kitahara also admits he failed the national trainer exam but reassures Oguri Cap he will try hard next year. Musaka discusses with Belno Light on how the Zone is the manifestation of one's love for running and hopes that having Oguri Cap train with her old friends will help rekindle it. As Oguri Cap trains with Fujimasa March and Norn Ace, Symboli Rudolf is visited by Komiyama on behalf of Tamamo Cross.
20	"The Answer"; Transliteration: "Kotae" (Japanese: 答え)	Ichirō Tanaka & Takehiro Shimizu	Takehiro Shimizu	November 30, 2025
Symboli Rudolf agrees to help fulfill Tamamo Cross' request. Oguri Cap, Tamamo Cross, Super Creek, and Dicta Striker attend a press conference, where Tamamo Cross announces that the Arima Kinen will be her last Twinkle Series race. A distraught Oguri Cap questions their rivalry and pleads for her to reconsider, but is angrily dismissed by Tamamo Cross. Komiyama admits to Belno Light that she anticipated Tamamo Cross' retirement and has been tending to her since meeting her through her elderly trainer. Hearing this, Belno Light is inspired to create a training regimen suited for Oguri Cap and devises a plan to overcome the steep incline at the Arima Kinen. Meanwhile, Dicta Striker teaches Oguri Cap how to enter the Zone out of a desire to race her at her best. Oguri Cap almost breaks through when Dicta Striker advises she save it for the actual race. On the day of the Arima Kinen, Oguri Cap, Tamamo Cross, Super Creek, and Dicta Striker prepare to face each other.
21	"The Arima Kinen"; Transliteration: "Arima Kinen" (Japanese: 有マ記念)	Ryo Asahi & Zhe Liu	Seiji Ishigami	December 7, 2025
Tamamo Cross reflects on her career and thanks Komiyama for supporting her before entering the track. Symboli Rudolf privately apologizes to Oguri Cap for her initial hostility, though Oguri Cap nevertheless thanks Symboli Rudolf on scouting her for the Twinkle Series and allowing her to race against the best. Oguri Cap denounces Tamamo Cross as her rival and vows to win. The Arima Kinen commences, and Oguri Cap overcomes the steep incline with Belno Light's regimen. Oguri Cap maintains her stamina with Super Creek and Tamamo Cross throughout the race, while Dicta Striker bleeds out after sustaining a severe head wound during the start. The pack holds back their spurt as they approach the final stretch, when Tamamo Cross enters the Zone to force the other racers on making a move. Tamamo Cross marks Oguri Cap from the pack and begins pursuing her.
22	"Gray Phantom"; Transliteration: "Gurei Fantomu" (Japanese: 灰の怪物(グレイファントム))	Jun Fujiwara, Kōhei Kido & Takehiro Miura	Jun Fujiwara	December 14, 2025
Tamamo Cross and Oguri Cap duel at the homestretch, while Dicta Striker also enters the Zone and Super Creek unintentionally swerves in front of another racer in a futile attempt to catch up. As Oguri Cap begins to falter, she recalls her mother aiding her ability to run and her past experiences, realizing that she runs because she simply can. Oguri Cap finally breaks through to the Zone and surges ahead of Tamamo Cross, during which they remember first meeting as children in Kasamatsu. Tamamo Cross reconciles with Oguri Cap and the two girls enjoy the race, with Oguri Cap narrowly winning the Arima Kinen. Oguri Cap and Tamamo Cross reaffirm their rivalry, while an inquiry deems Super Creek's swerving as being dangerous and disqualifies her. Nase apologizes to a tearful Super Creek on pressuring her to win. Oguri Cap, Tamamo Cross, and Dicta Striker perform their Winning Live Concert, and Oguri Cap thanks her friends and fans for supporting her.
23	"A New Era"; Transliteration: "Atarashī Jidai" (Japanese: 新しい時代)	Haruka Hirota, Motomasa Maeda & Takuma Suzuki	Yoshinori Nakano	December 21, 2025
Tracen celebrates Christmas, and Dicta Striker cheers up a dour Super Creek to continue improving even after her mistake in the Arima Kinen. Belno Light congratulates Oguri Cap on becoming one of the best racers, as Musaka remarks they will be facing stronger opponents in the future. As this is happening, Inari One, a short-tempered Umamusume from Ōi, competes in the Tokyo Daishōten to transfer to the Twinkle Series. Inari One avoids multiple feints meant to force her to spurt prematurely and enters the Zone to win. She later proclaims she will make her fans proud in the Twinkle Series, and her performance catches the attention of Mr. C. B. and Maruzensky. Oguri Cap writes to her mother on her achievements since transferring to the Twinkle Series and thanks her, while Tamamo Cross flies back to Osaka and reunites with her elderly trainer.

== Short animation series ==
=== Umayon (2020) ===
No.	Title	Original release date
1	"40% And Below! Tracen Academy Special Make-up Exams"; Transliteration: "Yonjitten Shita! Toresen Gakuen Tsuishi Tokubetsu" (Japanese: 40点下！トレセン学園追試特別)	July 7, 2020
Grass Wonder, El Condor Pasa, and a sleep-deprived Special Week compete in an exam race, which Special Week pitifully loses.
2	"Newly Filmed! The Tracen Academy Video Introduction"; Transliteration: "Dekitate! Toresen Gakuen Annai Bui Tī Āru" (Japanese: 出来立て！トレセン学園案内VTR)	July 14, 2020
Tokai Teio, Symboli Rudolf, and Air Groove review an advertisement for Tracen, but Symboli Rudolf and Air Groove express annoyance at Tokai Teio's constant glances towards the camera in the video.
3	"The World You've Dreamed of Is Right in Front of You"; Transliteration: "Akogare no Sekai wa Hora Koko ni" (Japanese: 憧れの世界はホラここに)	July 21, 2020
Mayano Top Gun and Yukino Bijin observe Gold City's photoshoot sessions, as Gold City explains how she came to enjoy it despite initial reservations.
4	"The Opera: "Alas, It Is My Fate""; Transliteration: "Opera Gekijō: "Aa Sore ga Waga Shukumei"" (Japanese: オペラ劇場・『嗚呼それが我が宿命』)	July 28, 2020
An opera is held where Fuji Kiseki and T. M. Opera O duel for Maruzensky and Smart Falcon's affection. Eventually, both duelists set aside their differences and reconcile.
5	"A Major Clash?! The Ramen Cup (GII)"; Transliteration: "Dai Gekisen!? Rāmen-hai (Jī Tsū)" (Japanese: 大激戦！？ラーメン杯（GII）)	August 4, 2020
Special Week, Oguri Cap, and Taiki Shuttle race to finish their bowl of ramen and the gluttonous Oguri Cap finishes first, with Special Week and Taiki Shuttle following.
6	"An Elegant Lunch for Elegant Young Ladies"; Transliteration: "Ojōsama-tachi no Yūga na Ranchi" (Japanese: お嬢様たちの優雅なランチ)	August 11, 2020
Ines Fujin accompanies the affluent Mejiro McQueen, King Halo, and Fine Motion to a gyūdon restaurant, where they experience middle-class dining.
7	"Time to Hunt Rhinoceros Beetles! BNW"; Transliteration: "Kabutomushi Tori da yo! Bī Enu Daburyū" (Japanese: カブトムシとりだよ！BNW)	August 18, 2020
During summer training, Biwa Hayahide, Narita Taishin, and Winning Ticket set off to collect beetles after Winning Ticket suggests it, only for them to disturb a hornet's nest and run off.
8	"Hero Theater: Uma Soldier V!!"; Transliteration: "Hīrō Gekijō: Uma Sorujā Faibu!!" (Japanese: ヒーロー劇場・ウマソルジャーV！！)	August 25, 2020
In a parody of Super Sentai shows, Biko Pegasus, Sakura Bakushin O, Haru Urara, Silence Suzuka, and Seiun Sky thwart Agnes Tachyon and Manhattan Cafe's destruction of the city through unconventional means, much to Silence Suzuka's disbelief.
9	"Make the Dream Come True! Getaway Sisters"; Transliteration: "Yume o Kanaeyō! Nigekiri Shisutāzu☆" (Japanese: 夢を叶えよう！逃げ切りシスターズ☆)	September 1, 2020
Smart Falcon invites Silence Suzuka, Mihono Bourbon, Ines Fujin, and Maruzensky to form an idol group named the Getaway Sisters, after Smart Falcon receives an ominous premonition.
10	"You Get Spooked, You Lose! Test of Courage Showdown!"; Transliteration: "Bibittara Make! Kimodameshi Taiketsu!" (Japanese: ビビったら負け！肝試し対決！)	September 8, 2020
Daiwa Scarlet and Vodka participate in a test of courage with Matikanefukukitaru to prove to the other they are brave, but fail and run away. Daiwa Scarlet and Vodka are further frightened when Matikanefukukitaru reveals she never joined them in the test.
11	"Umayon Suspense Theater"; Transliteration: "Umayon Sasupensu Gekijō" (Japanese: うまよんサスペンス劇場)	September 15, 2020
Nice Nature and Mejiro Ryan confront Eishin Flash on her involvement in an attack towards Air Shakur and Tracen secretary Tazuna Hayakawa, which Eishin Flash easily admits due to their incompetence before faking her death by jumping off a cliff.
12	"Today's Main Race! The Gilded Vessel Obstacle Course (G1)"; Transliteration: "Honjitsu no Mein Rēsu! Kinfune Shōgai (Jī Wan)" (Japanese: 本日のメインレース！金船障害（GI）)	September 22, 2020
Tamamo Cross, Super Creek, and Hishi Amazon compete in a race orchestrated by Gold Ship, where Hishi Amazon and Tamamo Cross embarrass themselves with Gold Ship's obstacles. Gold Ship joins the race and wins, prompting Hishi Amazon and Tamamo Cross to chase her in a fit of rage.
13 (OVA1)	"It's More Elegant Than Eating!"; Transliteration: "Kuike yori kihin'nano desu!" (Japanese: 食い気より気品なのです！)	October 19, 2021
Mejiro McQueen fights off her hunger out of a desire to maintain her figure, only for her stomach to growl to her embarrassment.
14 (OVA2)	"I Want To Be An Adult Woman"; Transliteration: "Otona no on'na ni naritāi" (Japanese: 大人のオンナになりた〜い)	December 8, 2021
Mayano Top Gun discusses Maruzensky's beauty when she accidentally insults her, causing an eavesdropping Maruzensky to educate her.
15 (OVA3)	"Empress Without A Gap"; Transliteration: "Suki no nai jotei" (Japanese: 隙のない女帝)	December 8, 2021
Special Week approaches Air Groove for her picture on behalf of Gold Ship. However, Air Groove catches on to Gold Ship's prank and avoids her camera containing burst shots with flash, before demanding her presence.
16 (OVA4)	"Don't You Care About The Back?"; Transliteration: "Ushiro wa ki ni naranai?" (Japanese: 後ろは気にならない？)	December 8, 2021
Silence Suzuka shares that she is not worried about who is behind her as a front runner, motivating Special Week to cling on to her for the rest of the day.
17 (OVA5)	"Let's Eat More! Tama!"; Transliteration: "Motto tabeyou! Tama!" (Japanese: もっと食べよう！タマ！)	December 8, 2021
Oguri Cap tries to encourage Tamamo Cross to eat more during lunch, and Tamamo Cross shares her exasperation of getting used to rationing her food growing up.
18 (OVA6)	"You Can't Grow Up?"; Transliteration: "Ōkiku naremasen yō?" (Japanese: 大きくなれませんよ〜？)	December 8, 2021
Super Creek joins Oguri Cap and Tamamo Cross. After hearing Tamamo Cross' problem, Super Creek tries feeding her, only to anger Tamamo Cross further.
19 (OVA7)	"Aim For The First Prize Grand Strategy!"; Transliteration: "Mezase ittōshō!" (Japanese: 目指せ一等賞大作戦！)	December 8, 2021
Haru Urara attempts to enact a plan to get first place by following a carrot popsicle being held by Silence Suzuka, though she is unable to catch up to her speed.
20 (OVA8)	"Qualification To Challenge The Emperor"; Transliteration: "Kōtei ni idomu shikaku" (Japanese: 皇帝に挑む資格)	December 8, 2021
Tokai Teio begs Symboli Rudolf to a race, which she begrudgingly accepts on the condition that Tokai Teio beat Oguri Cap in an eating contest. Symboli Rudolf then remarks to Air Groove that the condition is impossible to accomplish, as Tokai Teio predictably loses to Oguri Cap.
21 (OVA9)	"Uniforms With Torn Sleeves And Bandages"; Transliteration: "Sode o chigitta seifuku to hōtai" (Japanese: 袖を千切った制服と包帯)	December 8, 2021
Manhattan Cafe notices Agnes Tachyon's torn sleeve and bandaged hand, which Agnes Tachyon explains she had come off an experiment gone wrong. Vodka misinterprets it as delinquent fashion and requests her to wear a chain, much to Agnes Tachyon's bewilderment.
22 (OVA10)	"Enemies Who Upset My Plan"; Transliteration: "Watashi no keikaku o kuruwaseru teki" (Japanese: 私の計画を狂わせる敵)	December 8, 2021
Eishin Flash declines Smart Falcon's invitation to baseball and explains she dislikes it for interrupting her news, surprising Smart Falcon.
23 (OVA11)	"Miho Dormitory Ghost Story Competition!"; Transliteration: "Miho ryō kaidan taikai!" (Japanese: 美浦寮怪談大会！)	December 8, 2021
After some students share scary stories of encountering Manhattan Cafe in the dark corridors of the Tracen dormitory, Manhattan Cafe recounts seeing herself in the dark, discomforting the students.
24 (OVA12)	"D On The Beach?"; Transliteration: "Hamabe no D?" (Japanese: 浜辺のD？)	December 8, 2021
Gold Ship tries scaring Special Week with a sea roach believing it is a pillbug, but Special Week reacts with surprise, leaving Gold Ship incredulous.

=== Umayuru (2022–23) ===
No.	Title	Original release date
1	"The Stormbringers"; Transliteration: "Arashi o Yobu Umamusume (-tachi)" (Japanese: 嵐を呼ぶウマ娘（たち）)	October 16, 2022
During training, a tense standoff between Symboli Kris S and Tanino Gimlet causes a storm to form, forcing the students to panic and evacuate.
2	"Taciturn Threat"; Transliteration: "Shizukanaru Shikkoku" (Japanese: 静かなる漆黒)	October 16, 2022
Symboli Kris S goes around Tracen and experiences compassion from various students, unaware that her stoic appearance unnerves them.
3	"Tea on the Rocks"; Transliteration: "Koyoi, Bā de Kakuteru o" (Japanese: 今宵、BARでカクテルを)	October 16, 2022
Vodka asks Tanino Gimlet for advice on looking cool as she idolizes Tanino Gimlet's charisma while drinking at a bar.
4	"Tsuyoshi's Glow Up"; Transliteration: "Tsuyoshi, Birudoappu!" (Japanese: ツヨシ、びるどあっぷ!)	October 23, 2022
Tsurumaru Tsuyoshi aims to train better when Agnes Tachyon offers her a performance-enhancing drink. After drinking it, Tsurumaru Tsuyoshi is placed in a muscle suit, which is later punctured during an acupuncture session with Sasami Anshinzawa.
5	"We're Over!"; Transliteration: "Zettai Zekkō Sengen!?" (Japanese: 絶対絶交宣言!?)	October 30, 2022
Daiwa Scarlet and Vodka argue and promise not to speak to each other again. Eventually though, the two get back to arguing.
6	"Solved by Breakfast"; Transliteration: "Nazotoki wa Chōshoku no Mae ni" (Japanese: 謎解きは朝食の前に)	November 5, 2022
Tokai Teio, Matikanefukukitaru, Agnes Tachyon, and Mejiro McQueen try solving a sauna's cryptic message, only for them to learn it is a welcome message. The group leaves without solving Daiwa Scarlet's missing tiara, much to her chagrin.
7	"Winning Over Sirius"; Transliteration: "Shiriusu-san no Okiniiri" (Japanese: シリウスさんのお気に入り)	November 13, 2022
Vodka engages Sirius Symboli in a battle of charisma but loses. Despite this, Sirius Symboli is left impressed by Vodka's perseverance.
8	"Otonashi's New Scoop"; Transliteration: "Shuzai desuyo! Otonashi-san!" (Japanese: 取材ですよ! 乙名史さん!)	November 20, 2022
Magazine reporter Etsuko Otonashi interviews Daiwa Scarlet and Vodka on style, causing the two to argue who has the better style between their idols Agnes Tachyon and Tanino Gimlet respectively. Agnes Tachyon and Tanino Gimlet later read Otonashi's report, prompting them to argue who holds more admiration between Daiwa Scarlet and Vodka.
9	"Initial Derby"; Transliteration: "Yama wo Kakeru!" (Japanese: ヤマヲカケル!)	November 27, 2022
Daiwa Scarlet, Twin Turbo, Air Shakur, and Happy Meek fiercely compete in an Initial D-inspired sprint race, where they conduct maneuvers like inertia drifting much to Maruzensky's awe.
10	"Curse of the Umamusume"; Transliteration: "Umamusume Hyaku Monogatari" (Japanese: ウマ娘百物語)	December 4, 2022
Seiun Sky frightens King Halo and Special Week after summoning ghosts when Matikanefukukitaru intervenes and exorcises the ghosts, including Seiun Sky. After Matikanefukukitaru leaves, the real Seiun Sky finds her frightened friends, much to her confusion.
11	"Chaos and Order"; Transliteration: "Ryūko Souhaku" (Japanese: 竜虎相搏)	December 11, 2022
Symboli Kris S informs Tanino Gimlet that Tazuna is dismayed at her damage to a fence. Tanino Gimlet stubbornly refuses to acknowledge it, leaving Symboli Kris S in awe.
12	"Tracen Turf Warz"; Transliteration: "Saikyō Chīmu! Pararira!" (Japanese: 鎖威拒宇血夷武！波羅離螺！)	December 18, 2022
Three cliques, Brian's Bandidos, the Sunday Syndicate, and Tony's Angels, vie for supremacy over Tracen as Tazuna breaks off the engagement, threatening them with a ban on training.
13	"Put Your Hands Up! Umayuru Rap"; Transliteration: "Uma Yuru Rappu de Puchohenza" (Japanese: うまゆるラップでプチョヘンザ)	December 25, 2022
A rap battle between Grass Wonder, T. M. Opera O, Winning Ticket, and Narita Taishin commences when Yukino Bijin upstages them and wins the crowd over her performance.
14	"Unlike Terms"; Transliteration: "Dōruikō dewa Kubirenai" (Japanese: 同類項では括れない)	January 15, 2023
Agnes Tachyon and Air Shakur use themselves as test subjects for their dangerous experiments, harming themselves in the process and gaining respect for one another.
15	"The Fall of Fencekind"; Transliteration: "Saku! Saku! Saku!" (Japanese: さく！サク！柵！)	January 22, 2023
Fine Motion and Symboli Kris S collect numerous fences for Tanino Gimlet to destroy as a way to satiate her obsession.
16	"The Claw of Cataclysm"; Transliteration: "Semari kuru Ma no te" (Japanese: 迫りくる魔の手)	January 29, 2023
Daiwa Scarlet finds herself at the mercy of a giant claw collecting her, before waking up and realizing it is a nightmare. Calmed by the realization, she leaves her dorm room, leaving behind an ominous Daiwa Scarlet plush.
17	"Newbie Ninjas"; Transliteration: "Nan ja Ninja Fan ja!" (Japanese: 何じゃ ニンジャ ファンじゃ！)	February 5, 2023
Fine Motion and Symboli Kris S train to become ninjas, as Agnes Digital stalks the duo and takes pictures. They later find her and express their admiration over her ninja skills.
18	"Test Track! The Race for Rudolf"; Transliteration: "Hakunetsu! Rudorufu-ō Senshuken" (Japanese: 白熱！ルドルフ王選手権)	February 12, 2023
Symboli Kris S, Sirius Symboli, Tsurumaru Tsuyoshi, and Air Groove compete in a quiz hosted by Tokai Teio that tests their knowledge about Symboli Rudolf. Tokai Teio reveals the winner to be herself, frustrating the participants.
19	"As the Golshis Will"; Transliteration: "G-sama no Iutōri" (Japanese: G様の言うとおり)	February 19, 2023
Gold Ship traps Special Week, Tsurumaru Tsuyoshi, Seiun Sky, King Halo, El Condor Pasa, and Grass Wonder, alongside Tazuna and Tracen chairman Yayoi Akikawa, in an escape room and enjoys their panic, only to be confronted by a furious Grass Wonder.
20	"Dealing with Danger"; Transliteration: "Shōbu-shi-tachi no Naku Yoru" (Japanese: 勝負師達の哭く夜)	February 22, 2023
Vodka joins a game of mahjong with Tanino Gimlet, Sirius Symboli, and Nakayama Festa despite having no familiarity with the game. Vodka experiences the high stakes nature of the game and wins by sheer luck, impressing her opponents.
21	"Fine Dining"; Transliteration: "Fain-ya-chan neru!" (Japanese: ファイン屋ちゃんねる！)	March 5, 2023
Air Shakur assists Fine Motion in a vlog of her eating at a ramen shop she personally built for the vlog, where she gives professional advice on setting up for filming.
22	"Spe and Oguri's Pony Pantry"; Transliteration: "Supe to Oguri no Uma Uma Kitchin" (Japanese: スペとオグリのうまうまキッチン)	March 12, 2023
Matikanetannhauser, Special Week, and Oguri Cap cook carrot hamburger steak, though they only serve a meager amount due to them eating the prepared meal.
23	"Shall We Derby?"; Transliteration: "Sharu ui Dābī?" (Japanese: Shall we ダービー？)	March 19, 2023
The Symbolis fight to invite Agnes Digital to a dance using their charisma. Agnes Digital refuses, remarking she would rather see the Symbolis dance with themselves to satisfy her inner desires, before revealing that she was playing an otome game.
24	"Into the Light"; Transliteration: "Hikari sasu Basho e" (Japanese: ヒカリ差す場所へ)	March 26, 2023
Symboli Kris S and Tanino Gimlet settle their dispute through a race and they recount their previous meetings. Both Umamusume express their respect for one another as they enter the course.

=== Umayuru: Pretty Gray (2025) ===
No.	Title	Original release date
1	"Brutal Standoff"; Transliteration: "Teppan Giragira! Jingi Naki Yatai Sensō" (Japanese: 鉄板ギラギラ！仁義なき屋台戦争)	April 30, 2025
Oguri Cap and Tamamo Cross join Gold Ship and Mejiro McQueen on serving a fusion of takoyaki and yakisoba at a school festival.
2	"Yatsuhashi Blight—the Seiun Case Files"; Transliteration: "Yatsuhashi Mura – Meitantei Sei-chan no Jikenbo -" (Japanese: 八つ橋村〜名探偵セイちゃんの事件簿〜)	May 2, 2025
Seiun Sky and King Halo investigate an alleged blight in Tsurumaru Tsuyoshi's village serving yatsuhashi, only for them to uncover a mundane outcome and the "blight" being a mispronunciation of Tsurumaru Tsuyoshi's aide Mejiro Bright.
3	"Destiny's Tide—the Turbulent Relay"; Transliteration: "Haran Hisshi! Rirē ha Desutinī" (Japanese: 波乱必至！リレーはデスティニー)	May 4, 2025
Biwa Hayahide races with Hishi Miracle at a relay race, though their fellow teammates are exasperated to learn there is no official finish line and they are racing the sakura season across Japan.
4	"The Art of Spectating"; Transliteration: "Rēsu Kansen no Bigaku" (Japanese: レース観戦の美学)	May 6, 2025
Chrono Genesis accompanies Curren Chan, Loves Only You, and Gran Alegria to a race and they intently observe the racers, with Chrono Genesis passionately taking notes.

=== Umayuru: Full Gate! (2026–27) ===
No.	Title	Original release date
1	"Seven Heads Are Better than One"; Transliteration: "Nana-nin Yoreba, Kin no Chie" (Japanese: 七人寄れば、金の知恵)	September 27, 2026
Special Week, Grass Wonder, El Condor Pasa, Seiun Sky, King Halo, and Tsurumaru Tsuyoshi are unable to decide for their classroom cafe theme, prompting Phalaenopsis to combine their diverse ideas into one unifying theme.
2	"Where Friendships Shine! Impressions Tournament!"; Transliteration: "Hakunetsu! Jesuchā Gēmu Taiketsu!" (Japanese: 白熱！ジェスチャーゲーム対決！)	October 4, 2026
Biwa Hayahide, Narita Taishin, and Winning Ticket challenge Sakura Chiyono O, Yaeno Muteki, and Mejiro Ardan in an escalating game of charades.
3	"Let Your Passion Take Form!"; Transliteration: "Dare ni mo Makenai Netsui o Āto ni!" (Japanese: 誰にも負けない熱意をアートに！)	October 11, 2026
Gold Ship challenges Fenomeno, Win Variation, Verxina, Orfevre, and Gentildonna to bring their passion to their full potential through an art class, collecting them to make a crude statue without much fanfare.
4	"Halloween Preparations"; Transliteration: "Harōin no Oshitaku!" (Japanese: ハロウィンのお支度！)	October 18, 2026
As Sakura Laurel shows off her costume for the school's Halloween event, Sakura Chitose O ponders on how to celebrate the holiday and unwittingly jeopardizes Samson Big, Royce and Royce, Matikanetannhauser, Rice Shower, and Mihono Bourbon's plans for a Halloween concert.
5	"The Show Uma-st Go On!"; Transliteration: "Shō Umasuto Gō On!" (Japanese: ショウ・うまスト・ゴー・オン！)	October 25, 2026
Before T. M. Opera O, Silence Suzuka, Taiki Shuttle, and Stay Gold start rehearsing for a play written by Narita Top Road and directed by Admire Vega with assistance from Meisho Doto, Stay Gold accidentally opens the curtains, forcing the cast to start the play early and go off script.
6	"Oguri Goes on a Diet!"; Transliteration: "Oguri no Genryō Daisakusen!" (Japanese: オグリの減量大作戦！)	November 1, 2026
Gold City, Tamamo Cross, Inari One, Bamboo Memory, and Super Creek subject an overweight Oguri Cap to numerous weight-loss methods, but when the weighing scale still registers her as overweight, they learn that Tamamo Cross' lightning powers have shorted the machine.
7	"Dearest Grandmother"; Transliteration: "Obaasama e" (Japanese: おばあさまへ)	November 8, 2026
For their grandmother's birthday, Mejiro McQueen, Mejiro Dober, Mejiro Ryan, and Mejiro Bright, with the help of Ines Fujin and Ikuno Dictus, read a letter while playing a family slideshow to show their gratitude to her.
8	"Save Us, PR Heroes!"; Transliteration: "Hīrō yo, Gakuen o PR Seyo!" (Japanese: ヒーローよ、学園をPRせよ！)	November 15, 2026
Sakura Bakushin O, North Flight, and Yukino Bijin film a video to promote Tracen, though it is interrupted by a Super Sentai-inspired fight between Hishi Akebono and Biko Pegasus against Seeking the Pearl and Shinko Windy, which they subsequently record.
9	"A Water Slide Slipup!"; Transliteration: "Harahara Suraidā Daisakusen!" (Japanese: ハラハラスライダー大作戦！)	November 22, 2026
Chrono Genesis, Gran Alegria, Marche Lorraine, Loves Only You, and Curren Bouquetd'or visit Water Umaland to take a break during the fall racing season, but when Marche loses her doll in the octopus slide, they must take a raft and figure out where it sled down to.

== Cypic animation series ==
=== Umamusume: Pretty Derby – Road to the Top (2023) ===
No.	Title	Directed by	Written by	Original release date
1	"A Dream's Starting Gate"; Transliteration: "Yume no Hajimari" (Japanese: 夢のはじまり)	Atsushi Nakagawa & Shinsuke Gomi	Cygames & Shūtarō Wada	April 16, 2023
Narita Top Road wins the Yayoi Sho, narrowly beating out Admire Vega and qualifying both racers to the prestigious Triple Crown races. Narita Top Road and Admire Vega promise to have a rematch in the upcoming Satsuki Shō, while the flamboyant and theatrical T. M. Opera O wins her first graded race, allowing her to qualify for the Satsuki Shō as well. All three racers train hard to prepare for the race as they meet by the entrance to the course, with each declaring that they will be the winner. Narita Top Road and Admire Vega fight for first place, only for T. M. Opera O to upstage them both for a surprise win. Narita Top Road is disappointed at failing the expectations of her trainer Okita, but both he and her fans still show their support for her, and she sets her sights for the Japanese Derby.
2	"A Glorious Stage"; Transliteration: "Eikō no Butai" (Japanese: 栄光の舞台)	Directed by : Cheng Zhi Liao; Storyboarded by : Takaomi Kanasaki	Kiyoko Yoshimura	April 23, 2023
Admire Vega is frustrated at her poor performance in the Satsuki Shō and vows to redeem herself at the Japanese Derby. Narita Top Road reviews her performance, where Okita points out she was at a disadvantage due to the tight corners. Okita trains Narita Top Road to play by her strengths in speed with the upcoming course's longer straightaways in mind, while T. M. Opera O basks in the new media attention following her win. Admire Vega camps out and recounts how she wants to honor her late twin sister, who was sacrificed for her to live, by winning the Japanese Derby. At the race, Narita Top Road overtakes T. M. Opera O, but they are both caught off-guard by a last-minute spurt from Admire Vega, who wins the Japanese Derby. Admire Vega feels a sense of closure with her victory, and T. M. Opera O, though dismayed at her loss, applauds her. Narita Top Road, however, breaks down in tears believing she has let down Okita and her fans.
3	"Reason to Run"; Transliteration: "Hashiru Riyū" (Japanese: 走る理由)	Chihaya Tanaka	Ryōko Yusawa	April 30, 2023
Admire Vega experiences nightmares of forgetting her sister following her victory. She later joins Narita Top Road and T. M. Opera O to a summer training camp. Admire Vega pushes herself to train with her leg injury out of a need to race for her sister's sake. Narita Top Road also trains despite offers to cool down, prompting Okita to confront her. Narita Top Road confesses that she fears of her fans abandoning her after repeated losses. Okita counters that they follow her for her perseverance, revealing they also set up a festival to cheer her up. Admire Vega later has a premonition of breaking her leg at the Kikuka-shō, which she accepts as punishment to atone for her sister. At the next preliminary race, Narita Top Road loses to Admire Vega, though Narita Top Road strives to improve. She later sees Admire Vega being only interested in winning the Kikuka-shō.
4	"One Dream"; Transliteration: "Omoi wa Hitotsu" (Japanese: 想いはひとつ)	Yū Kinome & Shūhei Fuchimoto	Kiyoko Yoshimura	May 7, 2023
While training with Okita, Narita Top Road encounters T. M. Opera O, who gives her words of encouragement. Inspired by T. M. Opera O's outlook, Narita Top Road approaches Admire Vega and proclaims her desire to be her rival, but Admire Vega remains wracked by her guilt. At the Kikuka-shō, Narita Top Road controls the pace around the course, as T. M. Opera O and Admire Vega trail behind her. Admire Vega, still tormented by the premonition, starts her spurt, forcing T. M. Opera O to follow suit. Seeing this, Narita Top Road begins her spurt and gains a massive lead. Admire Vega falls behind, as the spirit of her sister insists that she move past her trauma so she can enjoy racing as herself. Despite T. M. Opera O closing in, Narita Top Road wins the Kikuka-shō. Narita Top Road takes pride in her hard-won victory, while Admire Vega experiences peace in accepting her sister's wishes. Narita Top Road then performs the Winning Live Concert alongside T. M. Opera O and Admire Vega.

=== Umamusume: Pretty Derby – Beginning of a New Era (2024) ===
Title	Original release date
"Umamusume: Pretty Derby – Beginning of a New Era" Transliteration: "Umamusume Puritī Dābī Shinjidai no Tobira" (Japanese: ウマ娘プリティーダービー新時代の扉)	May 24, 2024
After witnessing Fuji Kiseki win a race, Jungle Pocket enrolls in Tracen Academy to become a Twinkle Series racer and joins Fuji Kiseki's team led by the trainer Tanabe. Jungle Pocket engages in a rivalry with Agnes Tachyon when the latter defeats her in the Hopeful Stakes, and she aspires to also beat T. M. Opera O. Fuji Kiseki then confides in Jungle Pocket on winning the Japanese Derby in her stead to fulfill her promise of making Tanabe a "Derby Trainer". However, Jungle Pocket becomes frustrated when Agnes Tachyon defeats her again at the Satsuki Shō and announces her indefinite hiatus. Jungle Pocket races in the Japanese Derby and wins against Dantsu Flame to fulfill Fuji Kiseki and Tanabe's promise, while Agnes Tachyon, who was aiming to have Jungle Pocket race in her stead, realizes she will be left behind by her rivals and becomes reclusive. Despite her victory, Jungle Pocket remains haunted by the inability to prove herself against Agnes Tachyon, resulting in her losing the Kikuka-shō to Manhattan Cafe. Seeing this, Fuji Kiseki reminds her of the reason she started racing. Jungle Pocket later visits a lonely Agnes Tachyon, reiterating her desire to defeat her in spite of her self-doubt, before leaving to race at the Japan Cup against T. M. Opera O. Jungle Pocket overcomes her self-doubt and wins, as Agnes Tachyon witnesses Jungle Pocket's drive and is inspired to end her hiatus. At a future race, Jungle Pocket and Agnes Tachyon have an opportunity for a rematch with Dantsu Flame and Manhattan Cafe, and the four later perform their Winning Live Concert.
