= Umamusume: Pretty Derby (TV series) =

Japanese anime television series

- Key visual of the first season. From left to right: Tokai Teio, Silence Suzuka, and Special Week

ウマ娘 プリティーダービー (Umamusume Puritī Dābī)
- Created by: Cygames
- Anime television series
- Directed by: Kei Oikawa
- Produced by: Cygames
- Written by: Akihiko Ishihara (S1); Masafumi Sugiura (S1); Cygames (S2); Shingo Nagai (S3); Tetsuya Kobari (S3)
- Music by: Utamaro Movement
- Studio: P.A. Works (S1) (Note: Production assistance (S2)); Studio Kai (S2–3)
- Licensed by: Crunchyroll; SEA: Medialink
- Original network: Tokyo MX, BS11, Kansai TV, sts, AT-X
- Original run: April 2, 2018 – December 28, 2023
- Episodes: 39 + 3 OVAs
Further information
Anime television series
Umayon
Directed by	Seiya Miyajima
Music by	Tetsuya Uchida
Studio	DMM.futureworks; W-Toon Studio
Licensed by	Crunchyroll; SEA: Medialink
Original network	Tokyo MX, BS11
Original run	July 7, 2020 – September 22, 2020
Episodes	12 + 12 OVAs
Original net animation
Umayuru
Directed by	Seiya Miyajima
Written by	Seiichirō Mochizuki; Yumi Suzumori
Studio	Scooter Films
Released	October 16, 2022 – March 26, 2023
Episodes	24
Original net animation
Umamusume: Pretty Derby – Road to the Top
Directed by	Chengzhi Liao
Written by	Tetsuya Kobari
Studio	CygamesPictures
Released	April 16, 2023 – May 7, 2023
Episodes	4
Original net animation
Umayuru: Pretty Gray
Directed by	Sawako Yuno
Written by	Deko Akao
Studio	Scooter Films
Released	April 30, 2025 – May 6, 2025
Episodes	4
Original net animation
Umayuru: Full Gate!
Directed by	Seiya Miyajima
Written by	Gigaemon Ichikawa
Music by	Kei Kato
Studio	AtoriE
Released	September 27, 2026 – present
Episodes	8
Anime television series
Umamusume: Cinderella Gray (2025)
icon

Umamusume: Pretty Derby (Note: Japanese: ウマ娘プリティーダービー, Hepburn: Umamusume Puritī Dābī; lit. "Horse Girl Pretty Derby") is a Japanese anime television series adaptation of the Umamusume: Pretty Derby franchise created by Cygames. The main anime series, focusing on the journeys of members of Team Spica and their races, aired for three seasons from 2018 to 2023. The first season, produced by P.A. Works, aired from April to June 2018. A second season now produced by Studio Kai, with P.A. Works assisting in its production, aired from January to March 2021. A third season produced solely by Studio Kai aired from October to December 2023.

Alongside the main anime series, multiple anime spin-offs have been made. An anime television series adaptation of the manga Umayon aired from July to September 2020. Its sequel, titled Umayuru, was released from October 2022 to March 2023. A web anime produced by CygamesPictures titled Umamusume: Pretty Derby – Road to the Top was released from April to May 2023. An anime film also produced by CygamesPictures titled Umamusume: Pretty Derby – Beginning of a New Era premiered in Japan in May 2024. An anime television series adaptation of the manga series Umamusume: Cinderella Gray produced by Cypic aired from April to December 2025, with a short spin-off anime titled Umayuru: Pretty Gray being released from April to May 2025. Another new short anime series produced by AtoriE, titled Umayuru: Full Gate!, began releasing in September 2026.

== Episodes ==
Season	Episodes		Originally released	
Season	Episodes		First released	Last released
1	13		April 2, 2018	June 18, 2018
2	13		January 5, 2021	March 30, 2021
3	13		October 5, 2023	December 28, 2023
CG	23	13	April 6, 2025	June 29, 2025
CG	23	10	October 5, 2025	December 21, 2025

== Production and release ==
=== Main series ===
An anime television series adaptation aired from April 2 to June 18, 2018, on Tokyo MX, with the first two episodes being broadcast back-to-back. The anime is directed by Kei Oikawa at P.A. Works, with scripts written by Masafumi Sugiura and Akihiro Ishihara, and music composed by Utamaro Movement. The opening theme is "Make Debut!", while the ending theme is "Grow-up Shine!" (グロウアップ・シャイン!); both are performed by Team Spica, consisting of Special Week (Azumi Waki), Silence Suzuka (Marika Kōno), Tokai Teio (Machico), Vodka (Ayaka Ōhashi), Daiwa Scarlet (Chisa Kimura), Gold Ship (Hitomi Ueda), and Mejiro McQueen (Saori Ōnishi). Crunchyroll streamed the series and its succeeding seasons.

A second season, with a returning cast and Studio Kai replacing P.A. Works in animation production, with the latter studio assisting on the production, aired from January 5 to March 30, 2021. The opening theme is "Yume o Kakeru!" (ユメヲカケル！; "Run for Our Dreams!"), performed by Team Spica, while the ending theme is "Komorebi no Yell" (木漏れ日のエール; "Sunbeam Cheer"), performed by Tokai Teio (Machico) and Mejiro McQueen (Saori Ōnishi). On February 22, 2022, a short serving as the epilogue to the second season, "1st Anniversary Special Animation", was released on YouTube to commemorate the first anniversary of the game.

A third season was announced on November 6, 2022. Shingo Nagai and Tetsuya Kobari supervised the scripts, while Studio Kai and the rest of the main staff returned from previous seasons. The season aired from October 5 to December 28, 2023. The opening theme is "Soshite Minna no" (ソシテミンナノ), performed by Kitasan Black (Hinaki Yano), Satono Diamond (Hina Tachibana), Satono Crown (Sayumi Suzushiro), Cheval Grand (Yūko Natsuyoshi), Sounds of Earth (Makiko), and Duramente (Akina), while the ending theme is "Akogare Challenge Dash!!" (アコガレChallenge Dash!!; "Longing for a Challenge Dash!!"), performed by Kitasan Black (Yano) and Team Spica.

=== Original net animations ===
An anime television series based on the four-panel manga spinoff Umayon (うまよん) aired from July 7 to September 22, 2020. The series is directed by Seiya Miyajima at DMM.futureworks and W-Toon Studio. A Blu-ray box set, which includes 12 new episodes, was released on December 8, 2021.

A new short anime series titled Umayuru (うまゆる) was announced on May 5, 2022. It is animated by Scooter Films with Miyajima returning to direct and design the characters, with Seiichirō Mochizuki and Yumi Suzumori writing the screenplay. It was released on YouTube from October 16, 2022, to March 26, 2023.

A new short anime series focusing on characters based on renowned gray racehorses, titled Umayuru: Pretty Gray (うまゆる ぷりてぃ〜ぐれい), was released on YouTube from April 30 to May 6, 2025.

Another new short anime series titled Umayuru: Full Gate! (うまゆる ふるげ～と！) was announced on August 22, 2026. Animated by AtoriE, it began releasing on YouTube on September 27, 2026. The anime is aiming for a Guinness World Record for "Most Speaking Characters in a Short-form Animation Series Based on a Video Game".

=== Spin-offs and film ===
An anime ONA series titled Umamusume: Pretty Derby – Road to the Top (ウマ娘 プリティーダービー Road to the Top, Umamusume Pretty Derby: Rōdo tū za Toppu) was announced on May 4, 2022. It is animated by Cypic and directed by Cheng Zhi Liao, with Tetsuya Kobari supervising the scripts and serving as scenario director, and Jun Yamazaki designing the characters and serving as chief animation director. The series was released on YouTube from April 16 to May 7, 2023. The theme song is "Glorious Moment!", performed by Narita Top Road (Kanna Nakamura), Admire Vega (Hitomi Sasaki), and T. M. Opera O (Sora Tokui). A compilation film opened in Japanese theaters on May 10, 2024.

An anime film titled Umamusume: Pretty Derby – Beginning of a New Era (ウマ娘 プリティーダービー 新時代の扉, Umamusume Pretty Derby: Shinjidai no Tobira) was announced on December 28, 2023. It is animated by Cypic and directed by Ken Yamamoto, with Kiyoko Yoshimura writing the script, Tetsuya Kobari serving as scenario director and story organizer, Jun Yamazaki designing the characters and serving as chief animation director, and Masaru Yokoyama composing the music. The film was released in Japanese theaters on May 24, 2024. GAGA Corporation International later released the film in North American theaters on February 27, 2026.

An anime television series adaptation of the Umamusume: Cinderella Gray manga was announced on August 23, 2024. It is produced by Cypic and directed by Yūki Itō and Takehiro Miura, with Aki Kindaichi handling series composition, Takuya Miyahara and Keigo Sasaki designing the characters, and Kenji Kawai composing the music. The series aired in two split cours on TBS and its affiliates, with the first cours airing from April 6 to June 29, 2025, and the second cours airing from October 5 to December 21, 2025. Remow licensed the series for streaming on Amazon Prime Video (North America), the It's Anime YouTube channel (select regions), Anime Onegai (Latin America) and ADN (Europe). Netflix is streaming the series in Asia-Pacific.

== Reception ==
The main anime series has generally received positive reviews over time. Although comments have been made on the series being another anime focused on moe anthropomorphism and functioning as a tie-in to the mobile game and broader franchise, the series' strengths of telling compelling sports stories with drama while occasionally balancing it with comedy are praised.

The first season was regarded by Christopher Farris of Anime News Network as being ambitious in telling its story through presenting drama and trivia simultaneously, pointing out the anime's nature as conceptually being a mobile game tie-in. Farris concludes that the first season contains a surprisingly solid sports story filled with energy and interesting characters, but he also notes that its mobile game stylings can sometimes be incongruent with the world and story, and the real-world Japanese horse racing trivia implemented within the season may come off as unclear to casual viewers.

Farris would later comment that the second season is an improvement, summarizing how it succeeds in telling a more ambitious and dramatic sports story that explored serious ideas. He would however remark on various characters from the first season being left out of focus, and acknowledges the series' inherent difficulty to engage certain audiences. The Blu-ray release of the second season additionally became the highest-selling home video release of an anime television series in Japan.

Farris compliments on the third season breaking away from the series' established story beats and continuing to strengthen the franchise's core concepts. However, he points out on the season being inconsistent in pacing, the supporting cast receiving little to no focus, and how it is holding back and playing safe compared to the second season's ambitious nature. He concludes that despite its imperfections, the third season remains sincere in telling a compelling and entertaining story.
