= Sakura Star O =

Japanese Thoroughbred racehorse

Sakura Star O サクラスターオー
- Sakura Star O racing at the 1987 Kikuka Sho.
- Breed: Thoroughbred
- Sire: Sakura Shori
- Grandsire: Partholon
- Dam: Sakura Smile
- Damsire: Intermezzo
- Sex: Stallion
- Foaled: May 2, 1984
- Died: May 12, 1988 (aged 4)
- Country: Japan
- Colour: Dark Bay
- Owner: Sakura Commerce Co.
- Racing colours
- Trainer: Yuji Hirai
- Jockey: Shinji Azuma
- Record: 7: 4-1-0
- Earnings: 185,450,000 yen

Major wins
- Yayoi Sho (1987); Japanese Classic Race wins: Satsuki Shō (1987); Kikuka-shō (1987)

Awards
- JRA Award for Horse of the Year (1987); JRA Award for Best Three-Year-Old Colt (1987)

Sakura Star O (Japanese: サクラスターオー, Hepburn: Sakura Suta Ō; May 2, 1984 – May 12, 1988) was a Japanese racehorse. In 1987, he won the JRA award for Japanese Horse of the Year and the JRA Award for Best Three-Year-Old Colt. (Note: Prior to Japan switching to the international age system for racehorses in 2001, they used an old age notation called "kazoedoshi", where all horses were considered to be one year old at birth.)

== Background ==
=== Pedigree and birth ===
Sakura Star O's dam was Sakura Smile, a mare foaled in 1978 at Fujiwara Farm in Shizunai, Hokkaido, whose sire was Intermezzo, winner of the 1969 St Leger Stakes, imported to Japan in 1970. She belonged to the distinguished female family descending from Star Roch, which traces back to Craigdarroch. During her racing career, she won four of her 29 starts, with notable third-place finishes in the 1981 Radio Nikkei Sho, Kyoto Himba Stakes, and Queen Elizabeth II Commemorative Cup. After retiring from racing, she became a broodmare in the same farm where she was born.

For her first breeding season, she was bred with Sakura Shori, another Sakura Commerce Co. horse and winner of the 1979 Arima Kinen. The hope was to produce a horse capable of running longer distances while mellowing-out Sakura Shori's temperament issues. Although Sakura Smile conceived successfully, she was carrying twins. Because twin pregnancies in horses often prevent both foals from developing properly, one embryo was intentionally reduced to improve the other foal's (Sakura Star O's) survival chances.

=== Early life ===
Originally, it was expected Sakura Star O would be able to nurse from his mother until reaching maturity. However, on July 15, Sakura Smile suddenly passed away while grazing due to volvulus, a type of bowel obstruction. From there on, Sakura Star O needed to be fed by humans, and was sent to graze alongside his great-great-granddamn, Start Roach, for daily exercise.

At the age of three and after undergoing training, Sakura Star O entered the stable of Yuji Hirai on April 10, 1986. Hirai had been a steeplechase jockey until the previous year, and had ridden Sakura Only to victory in the 1976 Autumn Nakayama Grand Jump.

== Racing career ==
=== 1986: Three-year-old season ===
Because Sakura Star O's damsire was the stayer Intermezzo, Hirai believed that he would not fully mature until he reached his older years. Consequently, Star O made his debut without having undergone the more standard and strenuous training; the hope was for him to have a longer career with less races-per-year than the average Sakura Commerce horse.

On October 5, he ran a Maiden race of 1,600 meters on the turf at Tokyo Racecourse, ridden by Sakura Commerce's principal jockey, Futoshi Kojima. Going off as the favourite, he finished second. He made his second attempt under the same conditions on October 18, recording his first victory. However, during these two races, Star O's pre-existing physical handicap—part of one of his legs being bent inward—became a major factor. Although the condition had been observed during his training, the decision was made to proceed with racing, only during which it became obvious he compensated for the affected leg by placing greater strain on his other legs, resulting in an injury. He would be unable to race for the next four months following his debut.

=== 1987: Four-year-old season ===
Sakura Star O returned to racing as a four-year-old on February 21, at the Kantsubaki Sho. He finished fifth, more than two lengths behind the winner, Material.

His trainer's focus shifted to the classics. It was decided Star O would take on the Yayoi Sho, a Grade 2 race held on March 8, which awarder priority entry rights to the Satsuki Shō. His jockey was switched out to Shinji Azuma, Sakura Smile's jockey, due to Sakura Commerce's dissatisfaction with Kojima's previous performance and recent riding of horses belonging to other companies.

Eleven horses entered the race. Hokuto Helios, a two-time graded-stakes winner, was the favorite to win; Sakura Star O was voted 6th favorite. From the start, Byukou, the 4th favorite, took the lead, while Star O and Hokuto Helios settled toward the middle of the pack. From the third turn, he began to push toward the outside and gradually advance, entering the final stretch in fourth place. He accelerated, taking over the front-running pace-setters Byoukou and Meiner Davite, winning by a neck. His winning time of 2:02.1 was the second-fastest in the history of the race at that time, behind only Symboli Rudolf's 1984 record..

With priority entry to the Satsuki Sho secured, Sakura Star O underwent more extensive training in an attempt to make up for the four months lost during his recovery period.

=== Satsuki Sho ===
Twenty horses entered the race, including a record nine that had already won graded stakes.

External Video Link
- 1987 Satsuki Sho (GI); Race video from the JRA official YouTube channel

Material, who had defeated Sakura Star O in the Kantsubaki Sho before winning the Spring Stakes to make three victories in four starts, was the favorite. Sakura Star O was the second choice.

During the race, most of the participants formed a tightly packed group, with Sakura Star O toward the rear, running on the outside of the main pack. With the race unfolding in a manner favorable to horses coming from behind, Sakura Star O began advancing from the outside at the third turn, making his move earlier than he had in the Yayoi Sho. He entered the final stretch in ninth place, still on the outside, and unleashed his final kick. With 200 meters remaining, he surged to the lead and began pulling away from the field. He finished two-and-a-hald lengths ahead of Gold City, securing his first GI victory. Material finished third.

His winning time of 2:01.9 was the third-fastest in the history of the Satsuki Sho at the time, behind the 2:01.1 set by Symboli Rudolf in 1984 and the 2:01.6 recorded by Tosho Boy in 1976.

=== Continuation of his Four-year-old season ===
Sakura Star O's team next set their sights on the second leg of the Classics, the Tōkyō Yūshun (Japanese Derby), and Hirai declared that he would "train him even harder." However, on May 15, sixteen days before the Tokyo Yushun, Sakura Star O developed desmitis of the suspensory ligament in his foreleg. The injury was severe, with an estimated recovery period of four months, forcing him to withdraw. The Derby was won by Merry Nice, who had finished seventh in the Satsuki Sho.

On June 3, Sakura Star O was transferred to the "Horse Spa" at the JRA Equine Research Institute's Tokiwa Branch in Iwaki, Fukushima. There, he underwent training in a pool, allowing him to exercise without placing stress on his injured legs. In the pool, he completed the course in 25–26 seconds, compared with more than 30 seconds for an average horse, while his heart rate remained lower than that of the other horses. Furthermore, although many horses required fatigue-recovery medication during their summer training, Sakura Star O had no need for it.

Four months after the onset of the injury, on September 15, Sakura Star O left Iwaki and returning to the Miho training center, although he was nor considered fully recovered yet. Reportedly, Hirai persuaded the rest of the team to set the Kikuka-shō as Sakura Star O's next target. Despite lingering concerns over his leg, Sakura Star O resumed training and underwent a final timed workout. Although the decision on whether to enter him in the race remained undecided until 10 days before the event, Hirai consulted Azuma about the horse's condition during the timed workout, who advised: "I think it will be fine. Let's do it." Sakura Star O was thus officially entered in the Kikuka Sho, and he arrived at the Ritto Training Center on November 1.

=== Kikuka Sho ===
Even after Sakura Star O's participation in the race had been confirmed, concerns over his leg persisted. Two days before the race, he underwent the examinations required for a horse returning from an extended break; although a JRA veterinarian judged him to be "just barely fit to compete in a race," he was not removed from the race. On the morning of, his leg was still swollen, but treatment reduced the swelling sufficiently for him to take part. Before the race, Hirai also told Azuma that "if the worst should happen, it would be all right to pull the horse down."

Hirai later clarified:

"He (Sakura Star O) was a horse who entered our stable thanks to the generosity of Mr. Sakura. He wanted to give a newcomer like me a chance to make a name for myself. And yet, I couldn't even get that horse into the Derby. I'm ashamed of that, which is precisely why I wanted him, at all costs, to win the Kikuka Sho

The Classics—especially the four-year-old Classics—are the most important races in our world. I also had a strong desire to see him run the 3,000 meters at Yodo, even if it meant ruining his legs.

You think that would be a terrible thing to do to the horse? Well, yes. It may have been nothing more than my own selfishness. I told Mr. Sakura that, too. I said, "Please, I beg you, grant this selfish request of mine.'"

— Yuji Hirai, in a 1998 interview

Eighteen horses lined up for the race. Merry Nice, who since the derby had won the St Lite Kinen, was the number one favorite; next were Gold City and Wild Dragon. Sakura Star O was voted 9th favorite. The relatively low regard for the Satsuki Shō winner reflected concerns over his six-month rest and his return without a preparatory race.

External Video Link
- 1987 Kikuka Sho (GI); Race video from the JRA official YouTube channel 1987 Kikuka Sho (GI); Race video from the Kansai TV Horse Racing Official YouTube Channel

Starting from gate 9 of the fifth bracket, Sakura Star O settled on the inside of the pack in a mid-field position. With four horses racing toward the front and three at the rear, the remaining runners formed the main pack; beginning at the third turn of the second lap, the horses in the pack began making their moves, with many seeking a path toward the outside. Sakura Star O, however, maintained his position along the inside and entered the final turn without moving outward.

In the stretch, he passed Merry Nice, who began to fade with 300 meters remaining, and burst through between No. 10 and No. 11, the two front-running horses from the same fifth bracket. Gold City advanced from behind Sakura Star O, chasing him toward the end, but Sakura Star O crossed the finish line a half-length ahead to win, securing his second consecutive Grade 1 victory.

During the race, Kansai Television announcer Kiyoshi Sugimoto famously exclaimed, "In the season of chrysanthemums, the cherry blossoms are in full bloom!" The phrase subsequently became emblematic of the race and has been widely quoted in connection with Sakura Star O. The 202-day interval between his victories in the Satsuki Shō and Kikuka Shō surpassed Symboli Rudolf's previous record of 41 days, set in 1984, making it the longest interval between the two races for a Kikuka Sho winner in the race's history; It also surpassed the 120-day interval recorded by Runera between the Yushun Himba and her subsequent victory in 1940, making it the longest gap between victories in Japanese Classic races.

=== Arima Kinen ===
In the year-end Arima Kinen fan vote, Sakura Star O received 141,494 votes to finish first. He became the tenth four-year-old horse to top the poll and the first to do so in 11 years, since Tosho Boy in 1976. Initially, the plan had been to skip the Arima Kinen, give him a period of rest, and target the following year's Tennō Shō (Spring), however, because he was first in the fan vote, the JRA wanted him to participate, while Hirai himself believed that the expectations of the fans had to be honored. The plans were therefore changed, and Sakura Star O was entered in the Arima Kinen.

Sakura Star O tended to perform less impressively in training than he did in races, and his workouts leading up to the Arima Kinen followed the same pattern, with him routinely being outpaced by lower-ranked horses. The media seized on these results to suggest that he was in poor condition. In reality, however, his condition was described very positively. Hirai remarked that "his shoulders and loins had become more substantial. It surprised even me, who sees him every day."

External Video Link
- 1987 Arima Kinen (GI); Race video from the JRA official YouTube channel

On December 27, Sakura Star O contested the Arima Kinen, voted as the favorite. He was followed in the betting by Dyna Actress, a five-year-old mare who had finished third as the highest-placed Japanese horse in the Japan Cup; Merry Nice, ninth in the Kikuka Sho; and Max Beauty, a four-year-old mare who had won eight consecutive races before finishing second in the Queen Elizabeth II Cup.

Starting from gate 5 in the third bracket, Sakura Star O settled on the inside in mid-field. He maintained this position for the full first lap. Beginning at the third turn of the second lap, the horses that had been holding toward the rear began moving up, and Sakura Star O likewise attempted to accelerate. However, he began to tire-out and drop back around the midpoint between the third and final turns. His leg caught in a hole created by the deteriorated track surface, and Azuma heard a snapping sound; he immediately attempted to stop the horse, but Sakura Star O's determination to continue running was so strong that Azuma was unable to stop him immediately. When they entered the stretch, Azuma dismounted and found that Sakura Star O's leg below the fetlock was bent at an angle of approximately 90 degrees. Sakura Star O was diagnosed with a ruptured suspensory ligament in his left foreleg and a dislocation of the first interphalangeal joint, he was subsequently deemed to have a hopeless prognosis.

=== Euthanasia after a 137-day treatment ===
Although Sakura Star O was diagnosed with a poor prognosis, he was not immediately euthanized at the request of Zen (the owner, Mr. Sakura) and Hirai. Instead, unprecedented life-prolonging treatment was undertaken, and on January 1, 1988, a special medical team was formed. A thorough examination conducted at Miho Training Center on December 28—the day after the Arima Kinen—determined that his life was not in immediate danger. In January 1988, he was fitted with splints to support the dislocated joint, special L-shaped horseshoes, and a custom cast, which helped stabilize his condition temporarily. At one point, the affected area even returned to normal body temperature.

However, by April, the special cast could no longer withstand the strain . On April 8, surgery was performed with the participation of 28 staff members and three operating surgeons. Over the course of three hours, a steel plate was implanted into the affected area and successfully secured with bolts. But soon afterward, the plate came loose due to movement inside his stall, necessitating a second five-hour surgery on April 23.

By April 25, his condition had deteriorated to the point where he could no longer get up on his own. On May 5, his fever temporarily subsided, but he fell on May 8. The fixed bolts came out, and parts of his skin peeled away, leaving flesh exposed as he grew increasingly weakened. At the time of the Arima Kinen, he had weighed 450 kg, but he had been deliberately slimmed down to reduce the burden on his legs until his weight dropped below 300 kg.

On May 12, while struggling to get up, he suffered a dislocation of the first and second joints of his right foreleg (the leg opposite the original injury). With both forelegs now dislocated, he became completely unable to stand. At 9:56 PM, euthanasia was performed at the clinic, and at 10:02 PM, he died at the age of five.

On May 18, a funeral was held at the Bato Kannon in Miho. His mane was enshrined at both the Miho Bato Kannon and the one at Tokyo Racecourse. However, Hirai did not enshrine the menko (hood/face protector) that Sakura Star O had used during his lifetime, saying, "I don't think he needs to keep running even after going to heaven". Hirai, who made the decision to euthanize, received criticism and protests from fans who did not know the full circumstances. Hirai responded to such voices as follows:

"For me, I don't feel the slightest bit that it's 'pitiful' to put them down. On the contrary, in most cases, it would be pitiful not to put them down. A horse with its leg dangling, blood spurting out, held together by just a layer of skin—do you really think it's pitiful to kill a horse like that? Don't be ridiculous. It's pitiful not to kill it. And besides, what kind of feelings do you think we have when we euthanize a horse...? I do think Star-O was pitiful, though. With an injury that severe, we should have given him the injection and let him go peacefully from the very beginning (...) When it comes to euthanasia, we in the racing world have our own way of understanding it, and we have to."

— Yuji Hirai, "Yushun Magazine," September 1993.

== Racing Record ==
Sakura Star O won 4 races out of 7 starts. This data is available on Netkaiba.

Date	Race	Class	Distance	Racecourse	Finish	Entry	Time	Jockey	Winner (2nd Place)
1986: Three-year-old season
October 5	Three-year-old debut		Turf 1600m	Tokyo	2nd	5	1:38.3	Futoshi Kojima	Wild Dragon
October 18	Three-year-old debut		Turf 1600m	Tokyo	1st	3	1:37.3	Futoshi Kojima	(Tee Win)
1987: Four-year-old season
February 21	Kanbai Sho	4-down	Turf 1800m	Tokyo	5th	10	1:50.4	Futoshi Kojima	Material
March 8	Yayoi Sho	GII	Turf 2000m	Nakayama	1st	1	2:02.1	Shinji Azuma	(Byuko)
April 19	Satsuki Shō	GI	Turf 2000m	Nakayama	1st	6	2:01.9	Shinji Azuma	(Gold City)
November 8	Kikuka-shō	GI	Turf 3000m	Kyoto	1st	9	3:08.0	Shinji Azuma	(Gold City)
December 27	Arima Kinen	GI	Turf 2500m	Nakayama	DNF	5	–	Shinji Azuma	Mejiro Durren

== Pedigree ==
Pedigree of Sakura Star O
Sire Sakura Shori (JPN) 1975	Partholon (IRE); 1960	Milesian	My Babu
Sire Sakura Shori (JPN) 1975	Partholon (IRE); 1960	Milesian	Oatflake
Sire Sakura Shori (JPN) 1975	Partholon (IRE); 1960	Paleo	Pharis
Sire Sakura Shori (JPN) 1975	Partholon (IRE); 1960	Paleo	Calonice
Sire Sakura Shori (JPN) 1975	Shirinella (GB); 1968	Fortino	Grey Sovereign
Sire Sakura Shori (JPN) 1975	Shirinella (GB); 1968	Fortino	Ranavalo
Sire Sakura Shori (JPN) 1975	Shirinella (GB); 1968	Shirini	Tehran
Sire Sakura Shori (JPN) 1975	Shirinella (GB); 1968	Shirini	Confection
Dam Sakura Smile (JPN) 1978	Intermezzo (GB); 1966	Hornbeam	Hyperion
Dam Sakura Smile (JPN) 1978	Intermezzo (GB); 1966	Hornbeam	Thicket
Dam Sakura Smile (JPN) 1978	Intermezzo (GB); 1966	Plaza	Persian Gulf
Dam Sakura Smile (JPN) 1978	Intermezzo (GB); 1966	Plaza	Wild Success
Dam Sakura Smile (JPN) 1978	Angelica (JPN); 1970	Never Beat	Never Say Die
Dam Sakura Smile (JPN) 1978	Angelica (JPN); 1970	Never Beat	Bride Elect
Dam Sakura Smile (JPN) 1978	Angelica (JPN); 1970	Star Highness	Your Highness
Dam Sakura Smile (JPN) 1978	Angelica (JPN); 1970	Star Highness	Star Roch

Sakura Star O was inbred 5 × 5 × 5 to Nasrullah, and 5 × 5 × to both Avena and Choclo. This information is available on netkeiba.
