= Gold City (horse) =

Japanese thoroughbred racehorse

Gold City ゴールドシチー
- Gold City at the 1990 Tokyo Yushun.
- Breed: Thoroughbred
- Sire: Viceregal
- Grandsire: Northern Dancer
- Dam: Italian City
- Damsire: Tesco Boy
- Sex: Stallion
- Foaled: April 16, 1984
- Died: May 2, 1990 (aged 6)
- Country: Japan
- Color: Chestnut
- Breeder: Shigekuni Tanaka
- Owner: Yushun Horse Co. Ltd.
- Racing colors
- Trainer: Izumi Shimizu
- Jockey: Masaru Honda
- Record: 20: 3-4-3
- Earnings: ¥157,705,400

Major wins
- Hanshin Sansai Stakes (1986)

Awards
- JRA Award for Best Two-Year-Old Colt (Note: Prior to Japan's revision of the way it counts horse ages to match the international standard in 2001, newborns used to be considered 1 year old, thus this award at the time was named "Best Three-Year-Old Colt.") (1986)

Gold City (Japanese: ゴールドシチー, Hepburn: Gōrudo Shichī; April 16, 1984 – May 2, 1990) was a Japanese Thoroughbred racehorse. His main victory was at the 1986 Hanshin Sansai Stakes, and he placed 2nd at the 1987 Satsuki Sho and Kikuka Sho.

== Background ==
Gold City was foaled on April 16, 1984, at Shigekuni Tanaka’s ranch in Monbetsu, Hokkaido. He inherited the characteristics of his sire, Viceregal, who died 13 days after his birth, and had a “tail-flower chestnut” with a golden mane and tail. According to Tanaka, Gold City possessed an excellent physique and “exuded an air of being born to run," but his temperament was also similar to that of Viceregal in that he was extremely spirited.

He was named “Gold City” because of his golden coat, and in the spring of 1986, when he reached the racing age of three, he came under the care of Izumi Shimizu, who had just opened a stable at the Ritto Training Center in Shiga Prefecture. Regarding her first impression, Shimizu stated, “I thought this horse would either achieve tremendous success or his career would end quickly—it was one or the other. I had a vague feeling that this horse’s entire life would hinge on whether his fiery temperament worked for or against him." Furthermore, upon his arrival at the stable, there was reportedly talk that “if he didn’t run very well, we’d donate him to Disneyland or somewhere to be used for riding lessons."

== Racing career ==
=== 1986: three-year-old season ===
On June 15, he made his debut in a maiden race at Sapporo Racecourse. Ridden by Masaru Honda, he was the third favorite, but he got off to a slow start and had to race from the back of the pack; despite closing strongly in the home stretch, he finished fifth. After finishing second in his next race, he claimed his first victory in his third start. At the end of July, he made his first graded stakes appearance in the Sapporo Nisai Stakes. Although he showed signs of intense restlessness in the paddock, he closed from the back of the field to finish second. Reflecting on the race, Honda stated, “Even though we finished second, he showed me he has a competitive spirit. Depending on how I ride him, I think he could compete with the top horses, so I’m looking forward to what lies ahead."

In September, he claimed his second victory in the Cosmos Sho, an open race, and on December 14, he competed in the Hanshin 3-Year-Old Stakes, the Kansai region’s championship race for 3-year-olds. He was the third favorite on race day. Even before the start, Honda remarked that he was “barely managing to stay in the saddle," and once the race began, the horse showed signs of wanting to move forward, unable to tolerate the slow pace. He took the lead entering the final turn, and after pulling completely away, the horse began to lose focus and nearly slowed down; however, when the two horses behind him closed in, he surged forward again, and the three crossed the finish line neck-and-neck. Following a photo finish, Gold City was declared the winner by a head over the second-place finisher, Sankin Hayate. This marked the first Group 1 victory for the jockey, trainer, owner, and breeding farm alike.

With this victory, the horse concluded the season and entered a rest period in preparation for the following year’s Classic campaign. In the 3-year-old category of the annual awards, the votes were split. Although Gold City received the third-highest number of votes—behind Kanto’s 3-year-old champion Merry Nice and Hokuto Helios, who had lost to Merry Nice in the Asahi Hai 3-Year-Old Stakes but had won two graded stakes races—he was jointly selected with Merry Nice as the Outstanding 3-Year-Old Colt on the grounds that “there was insufficient data to compare horses from the East and West, making it difficult to narrow it down to a single horse.”

=== 1987: four-year-old season ===
The 1987 season began with the Spring Stakes. Although Merry Nice also competed in this race, Material who was regarded as a horse with great potential, was the favorite. In the paddock, Gold City became so agitated that fans couldn’t help but chuckle; in the race, he finished sixth, 0.6 seconds behind Material, who had surged from the very back of the pack to overtake every other horse en route to victory.

The Satsuki Sho, held on April 19, featured a rare lineup not seen since 1955, with Gold City being the only horse from the Kansai region among the 20 entrants. Material was the favorite, while Sakura Star O who had won the preliminary Yayoi Sho was the second favorite; Gold City’s odds had dropped significantly to 11th favorite. He had suffered from colic four days before the race and was not in good condition, appearing unusually subdued in the paddock as well. In the race, he ran in second-to-last position, keeping Sakura Star O and Material in his sights until the final stretch. He then moved up in sync with Sakura Star O’s pace; although he couldn’t quite catch up to Sakura Star O, who surged ahead in the home stretch, he charged down the far outside to win the battle for second place, finishing second by a head over Material. Honda remarked, “The speed he showed at the end was breathtakingly sharp. If he’d been in peak condition, it would have been an even closer race,” Honda remarked.

Ahead of his second major title, the Tokyo Yushun, Sakura Star O was sidelined after developing suspensory ligament inflammation in both front legs. In contrast to his performance in the Satsuki Sho, Gold City was in the best condition of his career, raising the team’s hopes for a Derby victory. On race day, May 31, he was the second favorite. Material was the top favorite for the second time in a row following the Satsuki Sho, but the horse had lost 16 kg since his previous race and was not in top form. Seeing this, Honda reportedly felt, “We probably don’t need to race with Material in mind. One strong rival is out of the picture." When the race began, Gold City settled into the middle of the pack. He briefly moved up toward the front coming out of the second turn, but at the exit of the backstretch, he fell into his bad habit of losing focus, slowed down, and dropped back to fifth from the rear. In the final straight, he made a sharp charge from the rear, but finished fourth behind Merry Nice, who won by six lengths. Material finished 18th.

After the race, Gold City’s drop in position during the race was interpreted as “marking Material too closely,” and Honda’s riding was criticized. In response, Honda countered “I wasn’t even thinking about Material before the race even started. Just by looking at his physique, I could tell he was out of form—I think any jockey would have sensed that. It’s unbearable to be misunderstood like that,” and reflected, “I was so angry at the time that I decided right then and there, ‘I’ll never ride a horse owned by Gold City’s owner again.”

After the Derby, the horse spent the summer resting and made his comeback in September at the Kobe Shimbun Hai. The jockey was changed from Honda to Shigetoshi Saruhashi. Although the horse maintained third place throughout the race, he was unable to catch the winner, Max Beauty, or the front-runner, Hide Ryu O, and finished in third place. In the subsequent Kyoto Shimbun Hai, he veered wide immediately after the start, causing Million Casper to fall. Although he crossed the finish line in third place, two and a half lengths behind the winner, Leo Tenzan, he was disqualified. At the same time, Saruhashi was handed a six-day suspension, preventing him from riding in the Kikuka-shō. For the Kikuka-shō, he was partnered by a new jockey, Hiroshi Kawachi, one of Kansai’s top riders, and was backed as the second favorite behind Merry Nice on race day. In the race, he settled into a good position in fifth or sixth place throughout the race and entered the final straight, but Sakura Star O who was making his first start since the Satsuki Sho broke away first, and Gold City finished second, falling half a length short of the winner.

In December, he competed in the Naruo Kinen. He was backed as the favorite for the first time in a graded stakes race but finished sixth. The winner of that race was Tamamo Cross, a horse from the same crop who did not compete in the Triple Crown races.

=== 1988–1989: five & six-year-old seasons ===
From 1988 onward, he ran seven races. His best finishes were third-place finishes in the Kyoto Daishoten and the Sankei Osaka Hai, with Honda back in the saddle. He retired from racing after finishing 10th in the 1989 Takarazuka Kinen.

== Retirement & death ==
After retiring from racing, Gold City was transferred to the Miyazaki Racecourse (later the JRA Miyazaki Training Farm), owned by the Japan Racing Association to be used as a riding horse. Given his outstanding record as a racehorse, those involved had high hopes that he would excel as a show jumper; however, he was unable to get along with the other horses and repeatedly got into fights in the pasture. Then, about half a year later, on May 1, 1990, he was found standing in the pasture with his right front leg raised off the ground. A veterinarian administered first aid, but X-rays taken the following day, revealed a fracture of the right forearm bone with a poor prognosis, and he was euthanized on May 2. He died at the age of 7. No one witnessed the moment of the fracture, and those involved considered various possibilities—such as “he fell while provoking another horse and trying to flee,” “he was kicked by another horse,” or “he collided with a fence”—but were unable to reach a conclusion.

== In popular culture ==
An anthropomorphized version of Gold City appears as a character in the Japanese multimedia franchise Umamusume: Pretty Derby, voiced by Saki Kosaka. She is depicted as a popular, classy, and somewhat unruly fashion model, former child actress, and gyaru who struggles with maintaining a work-life balance in her modeling and racing career, which developed out of a need for her to feel recognition from others for her athletic abilities as an Umamusume rather than her beauty. She has a uniquely ambivalent relationship with the player trainer, and is part of a closely-knit friend group of other gyarus including Tosen Jordan, Daitaku Helios, and Mejiro Palmer. She makes an appearance as a major character in the spin-off series Umamusume: Cinderella Gray.

== Racing record ==
The following form is based on information from JBIS-Search and netkeiba. (Note: Prior to Japan's revision of the way it counts horse ages to match the international standard in 2001, newborns used to be considered 1 year old, thus there is a one-year difference in the names of certain races.)

Date	Age	Track	Name	Grade	Field	Fav.	Finished	Distance	Time	Jockey	Winner (2nd place)
June 15, 1986	2	Sapporo	Three-year-old Newcomer		10	3	5th	Dirt 1000m	1:03.0	Masaru Honda	Miho Best
June 29, 1986	2	Sapporo	Three-year-old Newcomer		6	3	2nd	Dirt 1200m	1:14.4	Masaru Honda	Kyoei Yuki
July 12, 1986	2	Sapporo	Three-year-old Maiden		9	1	1st	Dirt 1200m	1:13.9	Masaru Honda	(Tone Komichi)
July 27, 1986	2	Sapporo	Sapporo Sansai Stakes	G3	12	7	2nd	Dirt 1200m	1:13.4	Masaru Honda	Gal Dancer
September 20, 1986	2	Hakodate	Cosmos Sho	OP	9	6	1st	Turf 1700m	1:45.6	Masaru Honda	Tokino Carol
December 14, 1986	2	Hanshin	Hanshin Sansai Stakes	G1	8	3	1st	Turf 1600m	1:37.1	Masaru Honda	(Sankin Hayate)
March 29, 1987	3	Nakayama	Spring Stakes	G2	12	5	6th	Turf 1800m	1:49.9	Masaru Honda	Material
April 19, 1987	3	Nakayama	Satsuki Sho	G1	20	11	2nd	Turf 2000m	2:02.3	Masaru Honda	Sakura Star O
May 31, 1987	3	Tokyo	Tōkyō Yūshun	G1	24	2	4th	Turf 2400m	2:28.9	Masaru Honda	Merry Nice
September 27, 1987	3	Hanshin	Kobe Shimbun Hai	G2	8	4	3rd	Turf 2000m	2:03.0	Shigetoshi Saruhashi	Max Beauty
October 18, 1987	3	Kyoto	Kyoto Shimbun Hai	G2	12	2	DQ	Turf 2000m	2:16.8	Shigetoshi Saruhashi	Leo Tenzan
November 8, 1987	3	Kyoto	Kikuka Sho	G1	18	2	2nd	Turf 3000m	3:08.1	Hiroshi Kawachi	Sakura Star O
December 6, 1987	3	Hanshin	Naruo Kinen	G2	13	1	6th	Turf 2500m	2:34.4	Hiroshi Kawachi	Tamamo Cross
April 3, 1988	4	Hanshin	Sankei Osaka Hai	G2	12	3	4th	Turf 2000m	2:02.0	Hiroshi Kawachi	Fresh Voice
April 29, 1988	4	Kyoto	Tenno Sho (Spring)	G1	18	3	5th	Turf 3200m	3:23.7	Hiroshi Kawachi	Tamamo Cross
October 9, 1988	4	Kyoto	Kyoto Daishoten	G2	8	3	3rd	Turf 2000m	2:27.6	Masaru Honda	Meisho Eikan
November 27, 1988	4	Tokyo	Japan Cup	G1	14	13	12th	Turf 2400m	2:26.9	Masaru Honda	Pay the Butler
April 2, 1989	5	Hanshin	Sankei Osaka Hai	G2	13	7	3rd	Turf 2000m	2:02.1	Masaru Honda	Yaeno Muteki
April 29, 1989	5	Kyoto	Tenno Sho (Spring)	G1	18	6	11th	Turf 3200m	3:21.0	Masaru Honda	Inari One
June 11, 1989	5	Hanshin	Takarazuka Kinen	G1	16	11	10th	Turf 2200m	2:15.7	Masaru Honda	Inari One

== Pedigree ==
Pedigree of Gold City
Sire Viceregal	Northern Dancer	Nearctic	Nearco
Sire Viceregal	Northern Dancer	Nearctic	Lady Angela
Sire Viceregal	Northern Dancer	Natalma	Native Dancer
Sire Viceregal	Northern Dancer	Natalma	Almahmoud
Sire Viceregal	Victoria Regina	Menetrier	Fair Copy
Sire Viceregal	Victoria Regina	Menetrier	La Melodie
Sire Viceregal	Victoria Regina	Victoriana	Windfields
Sire Viceregal	Victoria Regina	Victoriana	Iribelle
Dam Italian City	Tesco Boy	Princely Gift	Nasrullah
Dam Italian City	Tesco Boy	Princely Gift	Blue Gem
Dam Italian City	Tesco Boy	Suncourt	Hyperion
Dam Italian City	Tesco Boy	Suncourt	Inquisition
Dam Italian City	Rinnes	Fidalgo	Arctic Star
Dam Italian City	Rinnes	Fidalgo	Miss France
Dam Italian City	Rinnes	Siegerin	Cover Up Nisei
Dam Italian City	Rinnes	Siegerin	Hiroichi
