= Shinko Windy =

Japanese Thoroughbred racehorse (1993–2023)

Shinko Windy シンコウウインディ
- Shinko Windy at the paddock of the 1996 Unicorn Stakes.
- Breed: Thoroughbred
- Sire: Doulab
- Grandsire: Topsider
- Dam: Rose Commander
- Damsire: Dust Commander
- Sex: Stallion
- Foaled: April 14, 1993
- Died: September 27, 2023 (aged 30)
- Country: Japan
- Colour: Chestnut
- Breeder: Genichi Sakai
- Owner: Osamu Yasuda
- Racing colours
- Trainer: Kiyotaka Tanaka
- Jockey: Yukio Okabe
- Record: 17: 5-3-1
- Earnings: ¥188,450,000

Major wins
- Unicorn Stakes (1996); Heian Stakes (1997); February Stakes (1997)

Shinko Windy (Japanese: シンコウウインディ, Hepburn: Shinko Windy; 14 April 1993 – 27 September 2023) was a Japanese Thoroughbred Racehorse from 1996 to 1999. He is best known as the first Japanese horse to win a JRA G1 dirt race, the 1997 February Stakes.

== Background ==
Shinko Windy was born on 14 April 1993 in Urakawa, Hokkaido. As a foal, Shinko Windy was known to bite both other horses and people. He was purchased by Osamu Yasuda and given the crown name Shinko. He was trained for his debut race in 1993, but maintained his habit of biting others throughout his life.

== Racing career ==
=== 1996: Three-year-old-season ===
Shinko Windy started out strong by winning his debut race at the Tokyo Racecourse dirt track. Despite this strong start, he was unable to win his next three races on turf tracks, though he did place second in the Kokemomo Sho. After this he moved back to dirt races to run the Asagao Sho and once again placed first. After this victory it was decided by his team to focus primarily on dirt courses. During the Tateyama Tokubetsu he placed second behind Daiwa Ocean by just a neck. The reason for this loss is because during the race, Shinko Windy lunged forward in an attempt to bite Daiwa Ocean, causing him to lose momentum. After this, he attempted his first graded race, the G3 Unicorn Stakes, which he managed to win. He next entered the Super Dirt Derby, and during the race bit Sanlife Teio. This bite spooked the horse who accelerated forward and won the race, causing Shinko Windy to finish second. He placed third in his final race of that year, the Derby Grand Prix held at Morioka Racecourse.

=== 1997: Four-year-old-season ===
On 6 January, Shinko Windy won his second graded race, the G3 Heian Stakes. He was then entered into his first G1 race, the February Stakes. Previously, the February Stakes had been a G2 race, but in 1997 it was promoted to the first G1 dirt-track race in the JRA. Despite poor weather on the day of the race, he managed to place first, securing his first and only G1 win. This was also be the final victory Shinko Windy achieved in his racing career. He placed fifth in the Antares Stakes and then seventh in his next race, before taking an extended break from racing.

=== 1999: Six-year-old-season ===
Shinko Windy returned to racing on 13 June 1999 to attempt another G1 race, the Yasuda Kinen. However, he performed poorly, placing 13th. He moveed on to non-graded races after this, but found little success. His final race was the Nippon TV Hai, where he placed fourth.

== Racing statistics ==
The following racing form is based on information available from JBIS-Search and netkeiba.com.

Date	Race	Class	Distance	Racecourse	Track	Finish	Entry	Time	Jockey	Winner (2nd Place)
1996 – three-year-old season
Jan 5	4 Year Old New Comer	Debut	1200m	Tokyo	Dirt	1st	15	1:13.8	Y.Okabe	(Shinki Itten)
Mar 3	Fukinoto Tokubetsu	OP	1800m	Chukyo	Turf	4th	15	1:51.0	H.Kobayashi	Boston Emperor
Apr 27	Kokemomo Sho	OP	2200m	Niigata	Turf	2nd	10	1:16.7	H.Hashimoto	Happy Woodman
Jun 9	Hosenka Sho	OP	2000m	Tokyo	Turf	4th	15	2:01.5	H.Hashimoto	Big Baillamont
Jun 29	Asagao Sho	OP	1800m	Nakayama	Dirt	1st	10	1:53.4	Y.Okabe	(Headline)
Aug 31	Tateyama Tokubetsu	OP	1800m	Nakayama	Dirt	2nd	16	1:52.2	K.Tanaka	Daiwa Ocean
Sep 28	Unicorn Stakes	G3	1800m	Nakayama	Dirt	1st	14	1:52.8	Y.Okabe	(Silk Phoenix)
Nov 1	Super Dirt Derby	GS	2000m	Ohi	Dirt	2nd	14	2:06.0	Y.Okabe	Sanlife Teio
Nov 23	Derby Grand Prix	GS	2000m	Morioka	Dirt	3rd	12	2:07.9	K.Tanaka	Ishino Sunday
1997 – four-year-old season
Jan 6	Heian Stakes	G3	1800m	Kyoto	Dirt	1st	16	1:49.9	H.Shii	(Toyo Seattle)
Feb 16	February Stakes	G1	1600m	Tokyo	Dirt	1st	16	1:36.0	Y.Okabe	(Stone Stepper)
May 03	Antares Stakes	G3	1800m	Kyoto	Dirt	5th	16	1:51.3	Y.Okabe	M.I.Blanc
Jun 24	Teio Sho	OP	2000m	Ohi	Dirt	7th	12	2:07.1	Y.Okabe	Concert Boy
1999 – six-year-old season
Jun 13	Yasuda Kinen	G1	1600m	Tokyo	Turf	13th	14	1:36.7	H.Goto	Air Jihad
Jul 4	Nada Stakes	OP	1800m	Hanshin	Dirt	5th	13	1:50.8	K.Take	Magic Game
Aug 14	Kanetsu Stakes	OP	1700m	Niigata	Dirt	6th	11	1:46.1	T.Kikuzawa	Gaily Magnum
Sep 15	Nippon TV Hai	OP	1800m	Funabashi	Dirt	4th	13	1:52.3	Y.Okabe	Snow Endeavor

- GS races were labeled as Listed (L) internationally

== Retirement ==
After retiring from racing, Shinko Windy became a stud for Shinko Farm, but only managed to produce 20 foals before the farm was purchased by Darley Japan Farm. After this he became a teaser at the Darley Japan Stallion Complex. He passed away on 28 September 2023 at the age of 30.

== In popular culture ==
An anthropomorphized version of Shinko Windy appears as a character in the Japanese multimedia franchise Umamusume: Pretty Derby, voiced by Yūki Takada. She is depicted as a petite, mischievous, and ferocious girl who has tendencies of biting people and pulling elaborate pranks to disguise her desire of seeking attention and affection from others. Takada, being the voice actor of Shinko Windy in Umamusume, was hired to introduce the stallions of the Darley Japan Stallion Complex in their stallion exhibition in 2023, where the real horse lived at the time.

== Pedigree ==
Pedigree of Shinko Windy (JPN), 1993
Sire Doulab 1982	Topsider; 1974	Northern Dancer; 1961	Nearctic; 1954
Sire Doulab 1982	Topsider; 1974	Northern Dancer; 1961	Natalma; 1957
Sire Doulab 1982	Topsider; 1974	Drumtop; 1966	Round Table; 1954
Sire Doulab 1982	Topsider; 1974	Drumtop; 1966	Zonah; 1958
Sire Doulab 1982	Passerine; 1977	Dr. Fager; 1964	Rough'n Tumble; 1948
Sire Doulab 1982	Passerine; 1977	Dr. Fager; 1964	Aspidistra; 1954
Sire Doulab 1982	Passerine; 1977	Pashamin; 1966	My Babu; 1945
Sire Doulab 1982	Passerine; 1977	Pashamin; 1966	Tir an Oir; 1949
Dam Rose Commander 1976	Dust Commander; 1967	Bold Commander; 1960	Bold Ruler; 1954
Dam Rose Commander 1976	Dust Commander; 1967	Bold Commander; 1960	High Voltage; 1952
Dam Rose Commander 1976	Dust Commander; 1967	Dust Storm; 1956	Windy City; 1949
Dam Rose Commander 1976	Dust Commander; 1967	Dust Storm; 1956	Challure; 1948
Dam Rose Commander 1976	Hama Hiryu; 1972	Partholon; 1960	Milesian; 1953
Dam Rose Commander 1976	Hama Hiryu; 1972	Partholon; 1960	Paleo; 1953
Dam Rose Commander 1976	Hama Hiryu; 1972	Dick Midori; 1967	Tosa Midori; 1946
Dam Rose Commander 1976	Hama Hiryu; 1972	Dick Midori; 1967	Taka Flame; 1955 (F. no : 7-e)

- Inbreeding : 4 x 5 to My Babu (Milesian's sire), 5 x 5 to Nasrullah (Zonah's and Bold Ruler's sire)
