= Tamamo Cross =

Japanese Thoroughbred racehorse (1984–2003)

Tamamo Cross タマモクロス
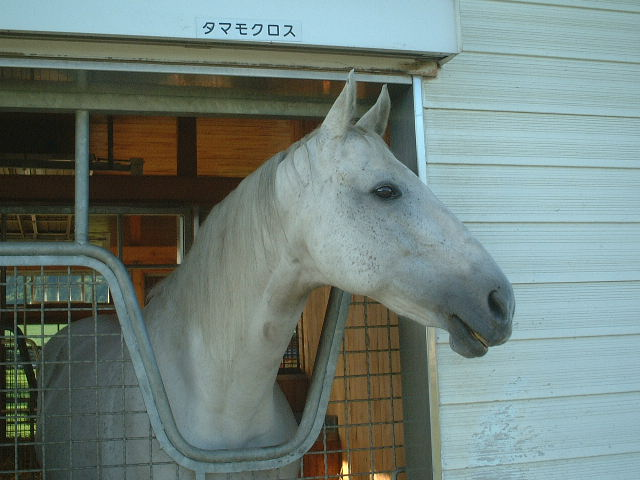
- Tamamo Cross in September 2002.
- Breed: Thoroughbred
- Sire: C.B. Cross (JPN)
- Grandsire: Fortino (FRA)
- Dam: Green Chateau (JPN)
- Damsire: Chateaugay (USA)
- Sex: Stallion
- Foaled: May 23, 1984
- Died: April 10, 2003 (aged 18)
- Country: Japan
- Colour: Gray
- Breeder: Nishikino Bokujo
- Owner: Tamamo Co., Ltd.
- Racing colours
- Trainer: Isami Obara
- Jockey: Katsumi Minai
- Record: 18: 9-3-2
- Earnings: ¥490,613,600

Major wins
- Takarazuka Kinen (1988); Tenno Sho (Spring) (1988); Tenno Sho (Autumn) (1988); Hanshin Daishōten (1988); Naruo Kinen (1987)

Awards
- Japanese Horse of the Year (1988); JRA Award for Best Older Male Horse (1988)

Tamamo Cross (Japanese: タマモクロス, Hepburn: Tamamo Kurosu; May 23, 1984 – April 10, 2003) was a Japanese Thoroughbred racehorse and sire. He competed from 1987 to 1988, recording nine wins in eighteen starts, including the 1988 Tennō Shō (Spring), 1988 Tennō Shō (Autumn), and 1988 Takarazuka Kinen. He received the Japanese Horse of the Year award in 1988.

== Background ==
Tamamo Cross was a gray horse bred in Niikappu, Hokkaido, by Nishikino Bokujo. He was sired by C.B. Cross, a Japanese stallion, and his dam was Green Chateau, a daughter of the American-bred Chateaugay. He was purchased by Michio Mino and raced under the Tamamo Co., Ltd. banner. He was sent into training with Isami Obara at the JRA's Ritto Training Center.

== Racing career ==
=== 1987: Three-year-old season ===
Tamamo Cross debuted on March 1, 1987, in a maiden race on the turf at Hanshin Racecourse, finishing seventh. He transitioned to dirt and won his next start, a maiden race at Hanshin on April 11. In May, he failed to finish an allowance race at Kyoto Racecourse after encountering interference.

He returned to the turf in October, winning two consecutive allowance races at Kyoto. On December 6, he contested the Naruo Kinen (GII) at Hanshin. Ridden by Katsumi Minai, he won the 2500-meter race by a margin of 1.0 seconds, setting a new track record of 2:33.0 on a good to soft track.

=== 1988: Four-year-old season ===
Tamamo Cross began his 1988 campaign by winning the Kyoto Kimpai (GIII) on January 5. In March, he contested the Hanshin Daishoten (GII), finishing in a dead heat for first place with Dyna Carpenter.

On April 29, he entered the Tenno Sho (Spring, GI) at Kyoto. He won the 3200-meter race by 0.5 seconds over Running Free, securing his first GI victory. In June, he won the Takarazuka Kinen (GI) at Hanshin, defeating Nippo Teio by 0.4 seconds.

In the autumn, Tamamo Cross contested the Tenno Sho (Autumn, GI) at Tokyo Racecourse on October 30. In a notable matchup against fellow gray horse Oguri Cap, Tamamo Cross took the lead in the final straight and won by 0.2 seconds.

On November 27, he ran in the Japan Cup (GI) at Tokyo. He finished second, losing by 0.1 seconds to the American-trained horse Pay the Butler. He made his final start in the Arima Kinen (GI) at Nakayama Racecourse on December 25, finishing second by 0.1 seconds to Oguri Cap.

Following the Arima Kinen, Tamamo Cross was named the 1988 Japanese Horse of the Year and received the JRA Award for Best Older Colt or Horse.

== Statistics ==
The following table details all 18 starts of Tamamo Cross's racing career based on official netkeiba and JBIS records.

Date	Distance (Condition)	Race	Class	Course	Odds (Favourite)	Field	Finish	Time	Winning (Losing) Margin	Winner (2nd Place)	Jockey	Ref
1987 – three-year-old season
Mar 1	Turf 2000 m (Firm)	4-Y-O Newcomer	Maiden	Hanshin	3.5 (2nd)	11	7th	2:07.1	1.8	Aichi Matsushima	Katsumi Minai	
Mar 21	Dirt 1800 m (Muddy)	4-Y-O Newcomer	Maiden	Hanshin	3.7 (2nd)	10	4th	1:56.3	0.7	Silk Maria	Katsumi Minai	
Apr 11	Dirt 1700 m (Good)	4-Y-O Maiden	Maiden	Hanshin	3.0 (2nd)	12	1st	1:48.3	–0.1	(Beautiful)	Katsumi Minai	
May 10	Turf 2000 m (Firm)	4-Y-O Allowance	Allowance	Kyoto	11.2 (6th)	15	DNF			Tosano Asakaze	Katsumi Minai	
Jun 28	Dirt 1800 m (Fast)	4-Y-O Allowance	Allowance	Sapporo	11.7 (7th)	8	6th	1:55.6	3.0	Hokkai Seizan	Seiki Tabara	
Jul 11	Dirt 2000 m (Fast)	Rebun Tokubetsu	Allowance	Sapporo	18.0 (7th)	9	2nd	2:07.1	0.2	Hirono Hayate	Tomio Yasuda	
Sep 19	Dirt 1800 m (Fast)	Nose Tokubetsu	Allowance	Hanshin	4.8 (3rd)	9	3rd	1:55.0	0.3	Alpha Vivace	Katsumi Minai	
Oct 4	Dirt 1700 m (Fast)	4-Y-O Allowance	Allowance	Hanshin	2.0 (1st)	11	3rd	1:47.9	0.6	Marukasky	Katsumi Minai	
Oct 18	Turf 2200 m (Firm)	4-Y-O Allowance	Allowance	Kyoto	9.6 (5th)	16	1st	2:16.2	–1.2	(Nachino Perso)	Katsumi Minai	
Nov 1	Turf 2000 m (Good)	Fujinomori Tokubetsu	Allowance	Kyoto	1.7 (1st)	14	1st	2:03.0	–1.3	(Meisho Hien)	Mikio Matsunaga	
Dec 6	Turf 2500 m (Good)	Naruo Kinen	GII	Hanshin	5.8 (3rd)	13	1st	R2:33.0	–1.0	(Meisho Eikan)	Katsumi Minai	
1988 – four-year-old season
Jan 5	Turf 2000 m (Good)	Kyoto Kimpai	GIII	Kyoto	2.2 (1st)	16	1st	2:03.7	–0.1	(Hallow Point)	Katsumi Minai	
Mar 13	Turf 3000 m (Good)	Hanshin Daishoten	GII	Hanshin	1.7 (1st)	7	1st	3:12.1	–	Dyna Carpenter (dh)	Katsumi Minai	
Apr 29	Turf 3200 m (Good)	Tenno Sho (Spring)	GI	Kyoto	4.4 (1st)	18	1st	3:21.8	–0.5	(Running Free)	Katsumi Minai	
Jun 12	Turf 2200 m (Good)	Takarazuka Kinen	GI	Hanshin	3.0 (2nd)	13	1st	2:13.2	–0.4	(Nippo Teio)	Katsumi Minai	
Oct 30	Turf 2000 m (Firm)	Tenno Sho (Autumn)	GI	Tokyo	2.6 (2nd)	13	1st	1:58.8	–0.2	(Oguri Cap)	Katsumi Minai	
Nov 27	Turf 2400 m (Firm)	Japan Cup	GI	Tokyo	3.2 (1st)	16	2nd	2:25.6	0.1	Pay the Butler	Katsumi Minai	
Dec 25	Turf 2500 m (Firm)	Arima Kinen	GI	Nakayama	2.4 (1st)	13	2nd	2:34.0	0.1	Oguri Cap	Katsumi Minai	

- R indicated that it was a record time finish

== Stud career ==
Tamamo Cross's descendants include:

c = colt, f = filly

Foaled	Name	Sex	Major wins
1990	Bridge Teio	c	Soshun Sho, Takeyoriwake Sho
1991	Black Cross	c	Derby Grand Prix
1991	Kanetsu Cross	c	American Jockey Club Cup, Epsom Cup, Naruo Kinen
1993	Shirokita Cross	c	Kobe Shimbun Hai
1994	T.M. Tokkyu	c	Kabutoyama Kinen
1994	Tamamo Inazuma	c	Diamond Stakes
1994	Makoto Raiden	c	Sirius Stakes
1995	Dantsu Sirius	f	Tulip Sho, Shinzan Kinen
1999	My Sole Sound	c	Hanshin Daishōten, Kyoto Kinen, Milers Cup, Kyoto Kimpai, Chunichi Shimbun Hai
2000	Win Generale	c	Nikkei Sho
2003	Tamamo Support	c	Radio Nikkei Sho, Kyoto Kimpai

== In popular culture ==
An anthropomorphized version of Tamamo Cross appears as a character in the Japanese multimedia franchise Umamusume: Pretty Derby, voiced by Naomi Ōzora. She is depicted as a small, spirited girl with a Kansai dialect (localized as a New York accent in the global release of the mobile game) who comes from a poor family and takes every opportunity she can to save money, reflecting her real-life counterpart's farm going bankrupt early in his life. She is childhood friends, rivals, and roommates with Oguri Cap, whose socially awkward and gluttonous behavior regularly exasperates her. Due to her small build and as part of a running gag, Super Creek often coddles and sometimes infantilizes her despite her protests. She makes an appearance as a major character in the spin-off series Umamusume: Cinderella Gray.

In the manga Midori no Makibaō, the titular character Midori Makibaou (voiced by Inuko Inuyama in the anime adaptation) is believed to be based on Tamamo Cross. He is depicted as a small, white mule who, despite his size, races against Thoroughbred horses.

== Pedigree ==
Pedigree of Tamamo Cross (JPN)
Sire C.B. Cross (JPN) 1975	Fortino (FR); 1959	Grey Sovereign	Nasrullah
Sire C.B. Cross (JPN) 1975	Fortino (FR); 1959	Grey Sovereign	Kong
Sire C.B. Cross (JPN) 1975	Fortino (FR); 1959	Ranavalo	Relic
Sire C.B. Cross (JPN) 1975	Fortino (FR); 1959	Ranavalo	Navarra
Sire C.B. Cross (JPN) 1975	Zuisho (JPN); 1968	Partholon	Milesian
Sire C.B. Cross (JPN) 1975	Zuisho (JPN); 1968	Partholon	Paleo
Sire C.B. Cross (JPN) 1975	Zuisho (JPN); 1968	Cumulus	Turk's Reliance
Sire C.B. Cross (JPN) 1975	Zuisho (JPN); 1968	Cumulus	Royal Deal
Dam Green Chateau (JPN) 1974	Chateaugay (USA); 1960	Swaps	Khaled
Dam Green Chateau (JPN) 1974	Chateaugay (USA); 1960	Swaps	Iron Reward
Dam Green Chateau (JPN) 1974	Chateaugay (USA); 1960	Banquet Bell	Polynesian
Dam Green Chateau (JPN) 1974	Chateaugay (USA); 1960	Banquet Bell	Dinner Horn
Dam Green Chateau (JPN) 1974	Queen Bee (JPN); 1966	Tudor Period	Owen Tudor
Dam Green Chateau (JPN) 1974	Queen Bee (JPN); 1966	Tudor Period	Cornice
Dam Green Chateau (JPN) 1974	Queen Bee (JPN); 1966	Corsa	Hindostan
Dam Green Chateau (JPN) 1974	Queen Bee (JPN); 1966	Corsa	Miss Channel

- Tamamo Cross was inbred 5 × 5 to Hyperion.

== See also ==
- Thoroughbred racing in Japan
- Tenno Sho
- Takarazuka Kinen
