= Seiran Sho =

Japanese thoroughbred race

- Location: Morioka Racecourse
- Inaugurated: 1993
- Race type: Thoroughbred - Flat racing

Race information
- Distance: 1,600 meters
- Surface: Dirt
- Qualification: Three and four years old from Iwate
- Weight: 55kg-57kg
- Purse: 1st: ¥3,000,000

The Seiran Sho (in Japanese: 青藍賞), is a Japanese horse race for three and four year old Thoroughbreds in the Iwate Horse Racing Association. Run at the Morioka Racecourse, the race has an "M2" grade rating.

== Race details ==
The race was originally created to celebrate the 30th anniversary of the Iwate Horse Racing Association.

The race was originally 2,000 meters, but changed to 1,600 meters in 2000.

The race has been held at both Mizusawa Racecourse and Morioka Racecourse.

== Winners since 2014 ==
Year	Winner	Jockey	Trainer	Time
2014	Community	Hidetoshi Abe	Kouzou Sakurada	1:43.0
2015	Namura Titan	Yuichi Sakaguchi	Masayuki Murakami	1:39.9
2016	Sea Chrome	Hidetoshi Abe	Yuki Chiba	1:41.2
2017	Cherry Picker	Junya Yamamoto	Shinichi Hatakeyama	1:43.6
2018	Empire Pegasus	Shunri Sugawara	Yuji Sato	1:39.2
2019	Empire Pegasus	Shunri Sugawara	Yuji Sato	1:38.3

== Past winners ==
Past winners include:

- 1993: Moriyu Prince
- 1994: Kikuno Hope
- 1995: Moriyu Prince
- 1996: Chamade Symboli
- 1997: Abe Again
- 1998: Admire Sun
- 1999: Ban Champ
- 2000: Running Mate
- 2001: Toho Emperor
- 2002: Toho Emperor
- 2003: Toyo Dehere
- 2004: Taiki Shenlong
- 2005: Air Weed
- 2006: Utsumi Jordan
- 2007: Silent Excel
- 2008: Toho Raiden
- 2009: Mayono Angel
- 2010: Meine Belinda
- 2011: Gold Mine
- 2012: Kamino Nouveau
- 2013: Rossa Corsa

== See also ==
- Horse racing in Japan
- List of Japanese flat horse races
