= Ishino Sunday =

Japanese Thoroughbred racehorse

Ishino Sunday イシノサンデー
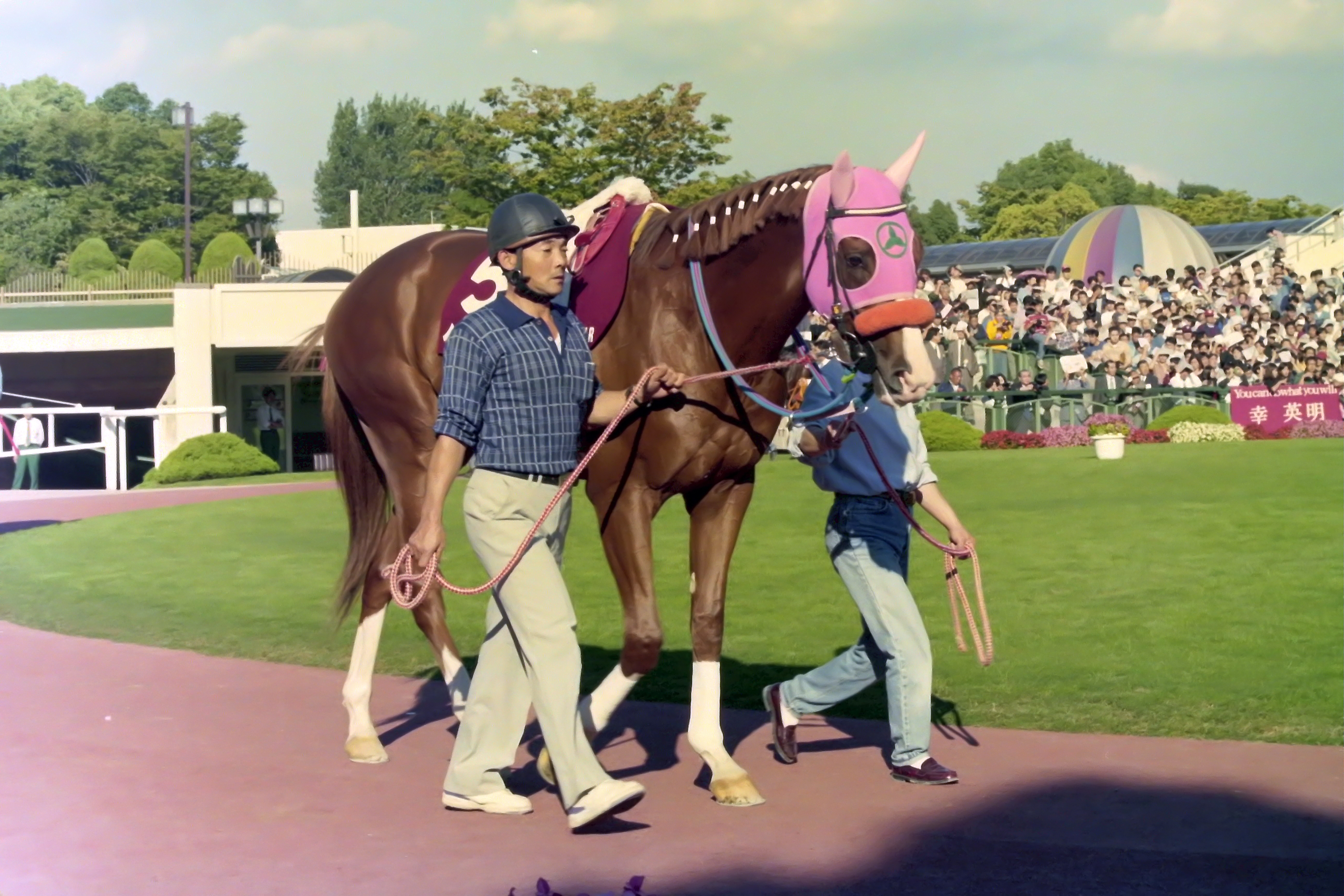
- Ishino Sunday at Kyoto Shimbun Hai paddock
- Sire: Sunday Silence
- Grandsire: Halo
- Dam: Jefforee
- Damsire: Alydar
- Sex: Stallion
- Foaled: May 29, 1993
- Died: August 18, 2024 (aged 31)
- Country: Japan
- Colour: Chestnut
- Breeder: Kazunori Hattori
- Owner: Ishijima Co., Ltd
- Racing colours
- Trainer: Kenji Yamauchi
- Jockey: Hirofumi Shii
- Record: 22: 6-2-4
- Earnings: 368,088,000 yen

Major wins
- Derby Grand Prix (1996); Kyoto Kimpai (1997); Japanese Classic Race wins: Satsuki Sho (1996)
- Last updated on January 18, 2026

Ishino Sunday (イシノサンデー, May 29, 1993 – August 18, 2024) was a Japanese thoroughbred racehorse and stud. He was known as the first horse to win two three-year-old exclusive races in both turf and dirt when he snatched the Satsuki Sho and Derby Grand Prix in 1996. Together alongside Bubble Gum Fellow, Dance in the Dark and Royal Touch, they were known as the four heavenly kings of 1996 Sunday Silence's progenies.

== Background ==
Ishino Sunday was foaled out of Jefforee, who placed second in the 1990 Hollywood Oaks and sired by Sunday Silence, the 1989 Kentucky Derby, Preakness Stakes and Breeders' Cup Classic champion who was also the leading sire in Japan for thirteenth straight years. There were four attempts of conception between his parents which causing him to being foaled quite late into the end of spring.

His name was derived from the owner's shorten name - Ishino and also a tribute to his sire, Sunday. His trainer, Yamauchi impressed with his training progress and contacted Hirofumi Shii to became his main jockey (which he accepted).

== Racing career ==
=== Two-year-old season (1995) ===
On September 2, He made his debut at Hakodate Racecourse in a 1800 meters turf race. The running was in a slow pace but he caught up with the lead at the end phase to win in his debut. He then ran in an open race but the weather was rainy, causing him to struggled and finished third. Then, he raced in the Kogiku Sho at Kyoto Racecourse. In this race, Shii urged an excited Ishino Sunday who positioned himself at seventh to accelerate at the fourth corner and overtook Eishin Guymon for his second win. He closed the season with the race with his first ever graded race, the Radio Tampa Hai Sansai Stakes. Ishino Sunday ran mostly in the middle pack until the slow pace promoted him into third position by the third corner. At the final straight, he moved up to the lead but soon caught by Royal Touch and finished second by just a head behind.

=== Three-year-old season (1996) ===
His first race of the year would be an open race called the Junior Cup at Tokyo Racecourse. This race was unceremoniously switched to a dirt track due to heavy snowfall on the turf but it did not became a hindrance for Ishino Sunday as he won the race by five lengths. Next, he ran in the Yayoi Sho, a trial race for the Satsuki Sho. He ran smoothly in the race but lost out the battle with Dance in the Dark and Tsukuba Symphony, came home on third place which was enough for him to race in the Satsuki Sho. Ishino Sunday was starting from the gate five to the lead but fell back to the middle pack as the race progress. Sakura Speed O, who was taking the lead got gassed by the fourth corner in which trailing horses such as Ishino Sunday and Royal Touch geared up for the final spurt. Ishino Sunday then moved on the outside, sprinted past Royal Touch and held on to win the race, three-quarters of a length ahead. There was some inquiry in the end as Ishino Sunday was suspected to have impeded the fourth-place finisher, Minamoto Marinos. The verdict came clean for Ishino Sunday as it was decided that Minamoto Marinos did not aware or affected by the impediment and managed to finish safely with a final surge.

In the next race which would be the Tokyo Yushun, Ishino Sunday did not fared well as he struggled on the final straight and only managed to place in sixth place. He spent the summer break in Monbetsu, Hokkaido and prepared for the classic final leg, the Kikuka Sho. Yamauchi was not satisfied for the training result and felt that Ishino Sunday was lacking something. His results in the St. Lite Kinen and Kyoto Shimbun Hai proved his suspicion was correct, as Ishino Sunday only managed to finish in fourth and fifth respectively in two different 2200 meters race. Considering the previous track record of him back in the Junior Cup, Yamauchi switched Ishino Sunday to race on a dirt track. His first race on dirt track would be the Super Dirt Derby at the Ohi Racecourse. This was possible as his friend, Takayuki Ishizaki who was a jockey vouched for the central-local horse exchange program which began in this year. When the race began, Sanlife Teio took the lead, while Ishino Sunday was in 4th and 5th place. As they approached the final corner, Shinko Windy and others, who had been trailing behind moved ahead and drew level with Sanlife Teio, forming a line alongside him. Meanwhile, Ishino Sunday was blocked but eventually he found the outside track and recovered the pace for a third-place finish behind Sanlife Teio and Shinko Windy. This battle continued onto the next race, the Derby Grand Prix which held in Morioka Racecourse. In this race, He marked Shinko Windy throughout the race, surged past him on the third corner and dashed away for the first place, one and a half length over the second-place Yuko Michael. A horse racing critic, Tamaki Abe explained that Ishino Sunday was the first horse to win two "G1-equivalent race on both turf and dirt in the same year".

=== Four-year-old season (1997) ===
He switched back to turf in the Kyoto Kimpai. This race began in a good way for him as he paced himself in fourth place along the race, before increased his pace to pulled away for the pack, achieving his third graded race win. He then switched back to dirt for the Dubai World Cup preparation but it came with disappointing result as he failed to podium in both Kawasaki Kinen and February Stakes. He then switched back to turf and finish in sixth at the Sankei Osaka Hai to closed out the season.

=== Five-year-old season (1998) ===
His result in this season were mix-and-match as he managed to snatch two podium finishes which are second-place in the Kyoto Kinen and third place in the Sankei Osaka Hai. After a sixth-place finish in the Yasuda Kinen, Ishino Sunday suffered from tendonitis injury and retired from racing.

== Racing form ==
Ishino Sunday won six races out of 22 starts. This data is available in JBIS and netkeiba.

Date	Track	Race	Grade	Distance (Condition)	Entry	HN	Odds (Favored)	Finish	Time	Margins	Jockey	Winner (Runner-up)
1995 – two-year-old season
Sep 2	Hakodate	2yo Newcomer		1,800 m (Firm)	7	5	1.4 (1)	1st	1:55.3	0.2	Hirofumi Shii	(Juno Pentagon)
Sep 24	Hakodate	2yo Open		1,800 m (Firm)	11	10	2.9 (2)	3rd	1:52.2	0.4	Mikio Matsunaga	Ekusereto Chateau
Oct 29	Kyoto	Kigiku Sho	ALW (1W)	1,600 m (Firm)	16	8	3.8 (2)	1st	1:34.3	–0.2	Hirofumi Shii	(Eishin Guymon)
Dec 24	Hanshin	Radio Tampa Hai Sansai Stakes	3	2,000 m (Firm)	15	10	2.4 (1)	2nd	2:02.7	0.0	Hirofumi Shii	Royal Touch
1996 – three-year-old season
Jan 20	Tokyo	Junior Cup	OP	1,600 m (Sloppy)	5	5	1.2 (1)	1st	1:38.9	–0.8	Hirofumi Shii	(Grand Cannonade)
Mar 3	Nakayama	Yayoi Sho	2	2,000 m (Firm)	13	11	1.9 (1)	3rd	2:02.9	0.2	Hirofumi Shii	Dance in the Dark
Apr 14	Nakayama	Satsuki Sho	1	2,000 m (Firm)	18	5	6.1 (4)	1st	2:00.7	–0.1	Hirofumi Shii	(Royal Touch)
Jun 2	Tokyo	Tokyo Yushun	1	2,400 m (Firm)	17	10	6.0 (3)	6th	2:27.1	1.0	Hirofumi Shii	Fusaichi Concorde
Sep 23	Nakayama	St. Lite Kinen	2	2,200 m (Soft)	9	9	2.5 (1)	4th	2:20.7	0.6	Hirofumi Shii	Rosen Kavalier
Oct 13	Kyoto	Kyoto Shimbun Hai	2	2,200 m (Firm)	11	5	5.5 (3)	5th	2:14.6	0.5	Hirofumi Shii	Dance in the Dark
Nov 1	Ohi	Super Dirt Derby	Grade-1*	2,000 m (Sloppy)	14	2	0.0 (1)	3rd	2:06.1	0.3	Takayuki Ishizaki	Sanlife Teio
Nov 23	Morioka	Derby Grand Prix	Grade-1*	2,000 m (Fast)	12	4	0.0 (2)	1st	2:06.9	–0.3	Takayuki Ishizaki	(Yuko Michael)
1997 – four-year-old season
Jan 5	Kyoto	Kyoto Kimpai	3	2,000 m (Firm)	16	1	5.4 (3)	1st	2:02.3	–0.3	Hirofumi Shii	(Yutosei)
Feb 5	Kawasaki	Kawasaki Kinen	Grade-1*	2,000 m (Fast)	11	4	0.0 (2)	6th	2:09.1	0.4	Hirofumi Shii	Hokuto Vega
Feb 16	Tokyo	February Stakes	1	1,600 m (Muddy)	16	3	8.5 (4)	9th	1:37.9	1.9	Tetsuzo Sato	Shinko Windy
Mar 30	Hanshin	Sankei Osaka Hai	2	2,000 m (Good)	9	1	5.9 (3)	6th	2:02.8	0.8	Hiroshi Kawachi	Marvelous Sunday
1998 – five-year-old season
Jan 25	Nakayama	American Jockey Club Cup	2	2,200 m (Firm)	11	10	30.7 (8)	6th	2:16.3	1.0	Hirofumi Shii	Mejiro Bright
Feb 15	Kyoto	Kyoto Kinen	2	2,200 m (Firm)	11	5	13.5 (6)	2nd	2:16.5	0.2	Hirofumi Shii	Midnight Bet
Mar 15	Nakayama	Nakayama Kinen	2	1,800 m (Firm)	9	3	4.8 (2)	5th	1:49.5	0.9	Masayoshi Ebina	Silence Suzuka
Apr 5	Hanshin	Sankei Osaka Hai	2	2,000 m (Firm)	9	5	18.6 (4)	3rd	2:01.6	0.3	Hirofumi Shii	Air Groove
May 3	Kyoto	Tenno Sho (Spring)	1	3,200 m (Firm)	14	12	40.9 (7)	9th	3:24.5	0.9	Hirofumi Shii	Mejiro Bright
Jun 14	Tokyo	Yasuda Kinen	1	1,600 m (Heavy)	17	6	40.6 (9)	6th	1:38.9	1.4	Katsumi Shiomura	Taiki Shuttle

Legend:
Turf Dirt

- All Grade-1 race was labeled as "Listed" internationally

== Stud record and death ==
Ishino Sunday stood as a stud at Shimousa Stud in Chiba. In his stud years, he was owned by the Japanese Bloodhorse Breeders' Association. So, he moved around by the association a lot from one stable to another as initiative for the breeding program. He retired as a stud in Shizunai stud and reassigned as a breeding training horse in 2016 in which he also spent the rest of his life there. Ishino Sunday was not a successful sire in which he only produced three foals and non of them are graded race winner. He died on August 18, 2024, at 31 years old due to old age.

== Pedigree ==
Pedigree of Ishino Sunday
Sire Sunday Silence	Halo	Hail to Reason	Turn-To
Sire Sunday Silence	Halo	Hail to Reason	Nothirdchance
Sire Sunday Silence	Halo	Cosmah	Cosmic Bomb
Sire Sunday Silence	Halo	Cosmah	Almahmoud
Sire Sunday Silence	Wishing Well	Understanding	Promised Land
Sire Sunday Silence	Wishing Well	Understanding	Pretty Ways
Sire Sunday Silence	Wishing Well	Mountain Flower	Montparnasse
Sire Sunday Silence	Wishing Well	Mountain Flower	Edel Weiss
Dam Jefforee FNo : 20	Alydar	Raise a Native	Native Dancer
Dam Jefforee FNo : 20	Alydar	Raise a Native	Raise You
Dam Jefforee FNo : 20	Alydar	Sweet Tooth	On-and-On
Dam Jefforee FNo : 20	Alydar	Sweet Tooth	Plum Cake
Dam Jefforee FNo : 20	Jeffo	Ridan	Nantallah
Dam Jefforee FNo : 20	Jeffo	Ridan	Rough Shod
Dam Jefforee FNo : 20	Jeffo	Silver Service	Prince John
Dam Jefforee FNo : 20	Jeffo	Silver Service	En Casserole

- Ishino Sunday was an inbred of 5 x 5 through Nasrullah (On-and-On's & Nantallah's sire)
