= Kane Hekili =

Japanese-bred Thoroughbred racehorse

Kane Hekili カネヒキリ
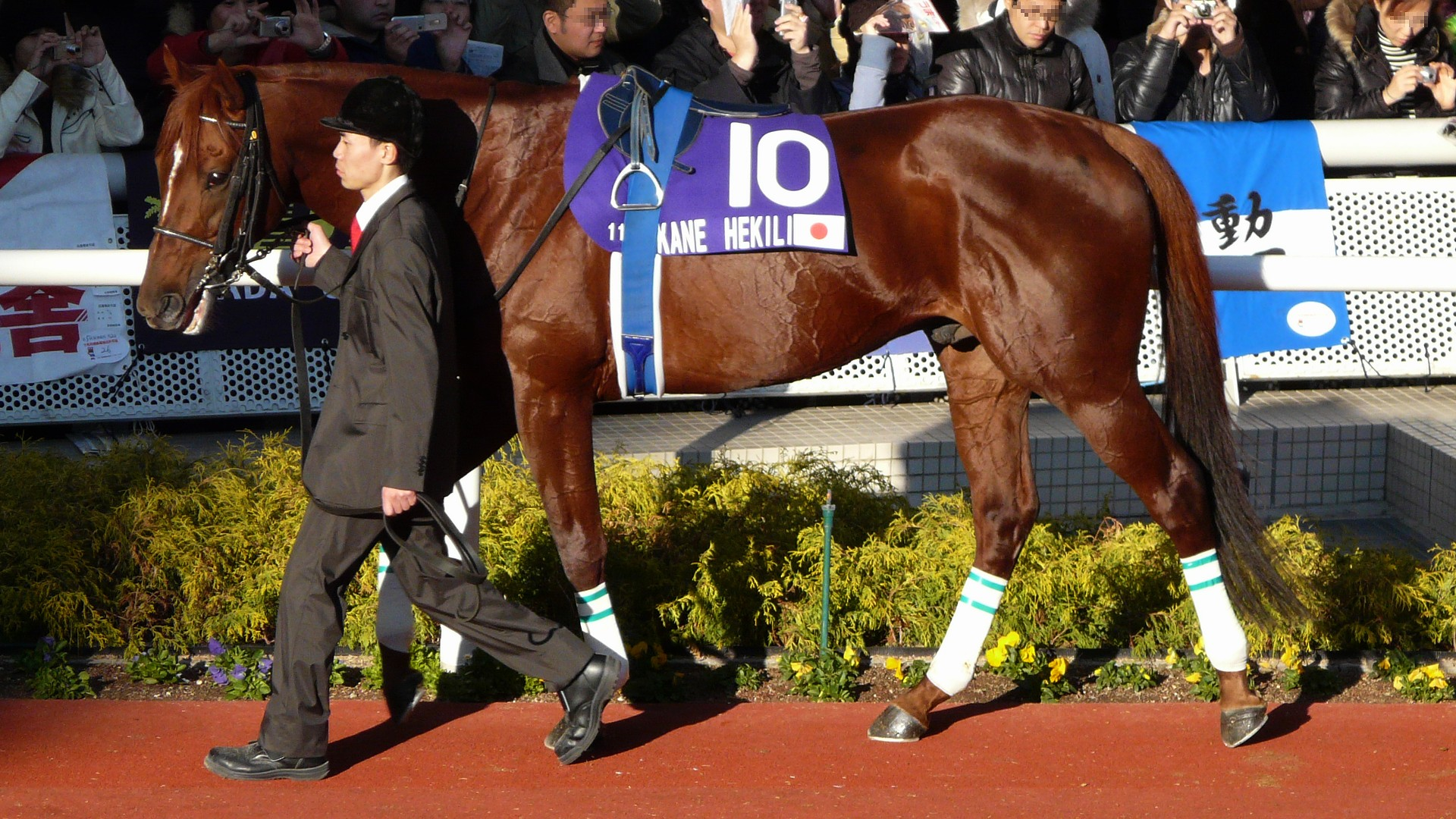
- Kane Hekili in 2008
- Sire: Fuji Kiseki
- Grandsire: Sunday Silence
- Dam: Life Out There
- Damsire: Deputy Minister
- Sex: Stallion
- Foaled: February 26, 2002
- Died: May 25, 2016 (aged 14)
- Country: Japan
- Colour: Chestnut
- Breeder: Northern Farm
- Owner: Makoto Kaneko
- Racing colours
- Trainer: Katsuhiko Sumii
- Jockey: Yutaka Take; Christophe Lemaire
- Record: 23: 12-5-1
- Earnings: 816,291,000 JPY; 180,000 USD

Major wins
- Japan Cup Dirt (2005, 2008); Japan Dirt Derby (2005); Unicorn Stakes (2005); Derby Grand Prix (2005); February Stakes (2006); Tokyo Daishōten (2008); Kawasaki Kinen (2009)

Awards
- JRA Award for Best Dirt Horse (2005, 2008)
- Last updated on January 27, 2026

Kane Hekili (Japanese: カネヒキリ, Hepburn: Kane Hikiri; February 26, 2002 -May 25, 2016) was a Japanese Thoroughbred racehorse named after the thunder god in Hawaiian mythology. In 2005 and 2006 he won four Grade 1 races on dirt in Japan and finished fourth to Electrocutionist in the 2006 Dubai World Cup.

Kane Hekili was injured after finishing second in the Teio Sho on June 28, 2006. He did not race again for more than twenty-eight months following surgery for a bowed tendon. He returned to racing on November 8, 2008, in the Grade 3 Musashino Stakes, finishing four lengths back of the winner. Entered in the December 7th Japan Cup Dirt, a Grade 1 race he won in 2005, Kane Hekili stunned his rivals and racing fans with a winning performance under French jockey, Christophe Lemaire.

== Background ==
Kane Hekili was foaled out Life Out There, an unraced mare from two time Leading sire in North America, Deputy Minister. He was sired by Fuji Kiseki, an unbeaten horse who himself was sired by the prominent Leading sire in Japan, Sunday Silence himself.

He was named based on the thunder god of Polynesian Mythology, Kanehekili. He was also called by the nickname of Deep Impact of the Sand which was a nod to his peer, Deep Impact who was an excellent horse on turf, owned by the same owner (Kaneko Makoto) and also jockeyed majorly by the same jockey, Yutaka Take.

== Racing career ==
In his debut season, he raced twice on the turf but finished down in the order on fourth and eleventh respectively. When he turned three-year-old, the team switched him onto the dirt course. He won his first two starts on dirt with wide margins of seven and ten lengths respectively. The team tried him on the turf again in Mainichi Hai in which he finished on seventh place. This result became a sign for the team to fully implemented him solely on dirt course in which he recorded four straight wins after that including two JPNI wins in the Japan Dirt Derby and Derby Grand Prix, two dirt races that were exclusive for the three-year-old. In his first race on the older horses competition, the Musashino Stakes, he started slowly but failed to catch up on the lead and lost to Sunrise Bacchus. This was his first lost on the dirt track. He ended the season with a race in the Japan Cup Dirt. When the race began, he started to position himself in the middle of the pack at eighth position. Take then turned him wide on the final corner and unleashed the finishing kick on the outside. 400 meters to the line, Star King Man, Seeking the Dia and himself battled it out in which Kane Hekili won it by a neck against the other two in a photo finish. With seven wins out of eight dirt races, Kane Hekili was awarded with the JRA Award for Best Dirt Horse of the year.

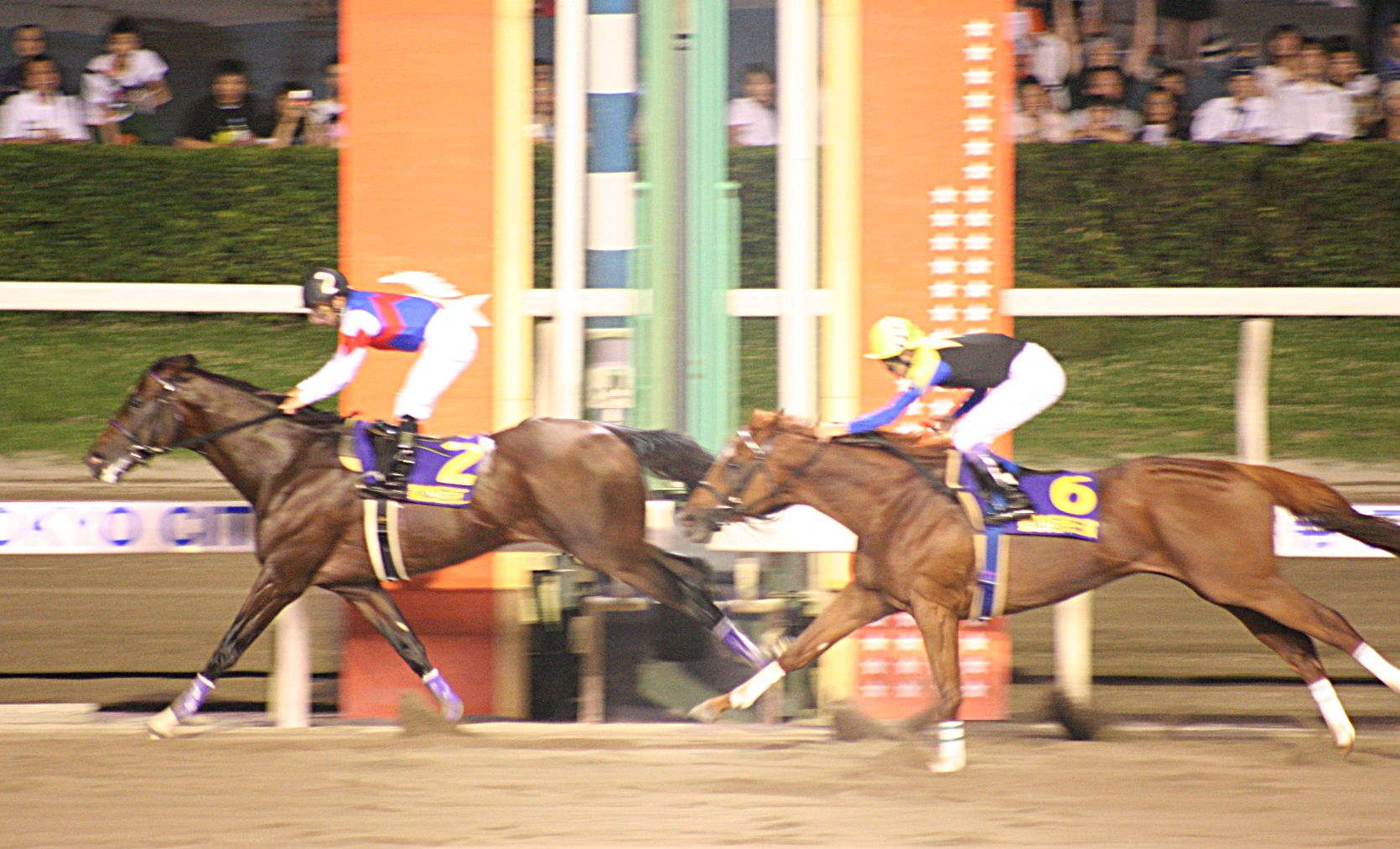
Kane Hekili (right) duel to the line with Adjudi Mitsuo in the 2006 Teio Sho

He started the 2006 season with the February Stakes. In the race, Meisho Bowler and Tosho Gear went on early to set up the pace for the race. Once the rhythm settled and they nearing the final stretch, Seeking the Dia sprinted early to the lead. Kane Hekili swept around the outside and stormed past Seeking the Dia for the win by three lengths. He finished the race just 0.2 second slower than the record set up by Meisho Bowler in the previous year which set him up excellently for the Dubai World Cup. He was eventually beaten at Nad Al Sheba, finished in fifth ten lengths behind the winner, Electrocutionist. Aftermath, he got promoted to fourth place as Brass Hat was disqualified because a post-race test revealed trace amounts of the drug methylprednisolone acetate. When he returned to Japan, he raced in the Teio Sho. He finished second on the race a length behind one of the strongest regional horse of that time, Adjudi Mitsuo. He then trained for the Mile Championship Nambu Hai but was diagnosed with tendonitis and had to be sidelined for a long time.

Kane Hekili returned back to the stable for recovery training in September 2007 but his right front superficial flexor tendonitis flared up again. He was sent back to the Northern Farm for recuperation, in which he undergone a stem-cell transplant on his injured area to fasten the regenerative tissues timeline. He was fully recovered on November 2008 in which he participated in another Musashino Stakes, the race he lost back in 2005. He was the second favorite, but he raced a little hard throughout the race and when he turned into the straight, the horses around him formed an umbrella-like wall around him. This blockage prevented him from breaking away either in front or to the side and he finished in ninth place with too much energy left. On December 7, he ran in the Japan Cup Dirt. This time, he was jockeyed by Christophe Lemaire. He got off in a good start, ran mostly on the inside lane before moving to the outside on the final corner and managed to hang on the battle with both Meisho Tokon and Vermilion for final 100 meters to win the race. This is his first win since the 2006 February Stakes, two years and ten months ago. Lemaire stayed on with Kane Hekili for the next race which would be the Tokyo Daishoten. In that race, Lemaire ride him in the similar fashion by riding outside on the final corner and having a duel with Vermilion (which was jockeyed by Take) to the line and got the win by a neck. His 2 G1 wins near the end of the year after the comeback was fruitful as he won the JRA Award for Best Dirt Horse for the second time after two years of absence.

In 2009, Kane Hekili started the campaign with the Kawasaki Kinen, a JPNI race in Kawasaki Racecourse. With Lemaire still on the reign, he managed to maintain his winning streak. This time, he won the race by half margin against Furioso. Then, the team entered him on the February Stakes for a fourth straight GI/JPNI race win and he was the favourite to do it. The attempt was unsuccessful as Success Brocken, upset the field and Kane Hekili finished in third behind him and Casino Drive. On May 5, he entered the Kashiwa Kinen. In the rainy condition, he entered the straight late as Espoir City already put the foot ready for the final spurt. He ended up finishing in second place three quarters of a length behind Espoir City. After the race, Hiroyuki Uchida who became his jockey that day quickly dismount from the ride as he felt the horse is in discomfort. The post-race examination showed that Kane Hekili suffered a fracture on the third phalange in his left foot, forcing him to take a year off the track. He returned back to racetrack in 2010, after passing a gate test to fulfill new requirements for the regional dirt track for the horse that was rested for one year or more. He was eligible for the Teio Sho with Norihiro Yokoyama as his jockey this time. During the race, he attempted to push from the middle of the pack but finished two and a half lengths in second-place behind Furioso. He won the next race which was the Mercury Cup, a JPNIII race in Morioka Racecourse by five lengths over Blue Lad in the second place. On August 12, he entered the Breeders' Gold Cup which was held in Monbetsu Racecourse. In the race, he positioned himself well in the front group and even took the lead for awhile but he was surpassed by Silk Mobius and ended up in second place, four lengths behind. He trained for the Nippon TV Hai next but he suffered another tendonitis injury in a different area of both his front leg this time. Due to recurring tendonitis injury and advanced age, he would be retired from racing and being put to stud duty at the Yushun Stallion Station.

== Racing form ==
Kane Hekili won 12 races, placed in second five times and third one time out of 23 starts. This data is available on JBIS, netkeiba and racingpost.

Date	Track	Race	Grade	Distance (Condition)	Entry	HN	Odds (Favored)	Finish	Time	Margins	Jockey	Winner (Runner-up)
2004 – two-year-old season
Jul 31	Niigata	2yo Newcomer		1,400 m (Firm)	14	14	6.7 (3)	4th	1:24.6	1.6	Yoshitomi Shibata	Felicia
Aug 21	Kokura	2yo Maiden		1,800 m (Firm)	13	5	8.9 (5)	11th	1:51.0	2.1	Yuichi Fukunaga	Nihonpillow Brave
2005 – three-year-old season
Feb 13	Kyoto	3yo Maiden		1,800 m (Fast)	14	13	59.5 (9)	1st	1:53.3	–1.2	Kenichi Ikezoe	(Sun Season)
Feb 26	Nakayama	3yo Allowance	1W	1,800 m (Sloppy)	10	8	1.3 (1)	1st	1:53.3	–1.8	Olivier Peslier	(Shuzan Eagle)
Mar 26	Hanshin	Mainichi Hai	III	2,000 m (Firm)	14	13	8.3 (3)	7th	2:03.0	0.8	Yutaka Take	Rosenkreuz
Apr 30	Kyoto	Tango Stakes	OP	1,800 m (Fast)	14	9	1.2 (1)	1st	1:50.4	–1.8	Yutaka Take	(Eishin Newton)
Jun 4	Tokyo	Unicorn Stakes	III	1,600 m (Fast)	16	11	1.1 (1)	1st	1:36.5	–0.3	Yutaka Take	(Agnes Jedi)
Jul 13	Ohi	Japan Dirt Derby	JPN I (Note: All JPN graded race were labeled Listed (L) internationally)	2,000 m (Fast)	14	10	0.0 (1)	1st	2:04.9	–0.8	Yutaka Take	(Maple Eight)
Sep 19	Morioka	Derby Grand Prix	JPN I	2,000 m (Fast)	12	6	0.0 (1)	1st	2:03.8	–0.4	Yutaka Take	(Sunrise Bacchus)
Oct 29	Tokyo	Musashino Stakes	III	1,600 m (Fast)	16	8	1.3 (1)	2nd	1:35.5	0.3	Yutaka Take	Sunrise Bacchus
Nov 26	Tokyo	Japan Cup Dirt	I	2,100 m (Fast)	16	10	2.1 (1)	1st	R2:08.0 (Note: R indicated that it was a record time finish)	0.0	Yutaka Take	(Seeking the Dia)
2006 – four-year-old season
Feb 19	Tokyo	February Stakes	I	1,600 m (Fast)	16	14	2.7 (1)	1st	1:34.9	–0.5	Yutaka Take	(Seeking the Dia)
Mar 25	Nad Al Sheba	Dubai World Cup	I	2,000 m (Good)	11	5	7/2 (4)	4th	2:03.3	2.0	Yutaka Take	Electrocutionist
Jun 28	Ohi	Teio Sho	JPN I	2,000 m (Fast)	13	6	1.6 (1)	2nd	2:02.3	0.2	Yutaka Take	Adjudi Mitsuo
2008 – six-year-old season
Nov 8	Tokyo	Musashino Stakes	III	1,600 m (Fast)	16	1	6.4 (2)	9th	1:36.6	0.6	Yutaka Take	Kikuno Salire
Dec 7	Hanshin	Japan Cup Dirt	I	1,800 m (Fast)	15	10	9.8 (4)	1st	1:49.2	0.0	Christophe Lemaire	(Meisho Tokon)
Dec 29	Ohi	Tokyo Daishoten	JPN I	2,000 m (Fast)	10	9	3.1 (2)	1st	2:04.5	0.0	Christophe Lemaire	(Vermilion)
2009 – seven-year-old season
Jan 28	Kawasaki	Kawasaki Kinen	JPN I	2,100 m (Good)	13	3	1.1 (1)	1st	2:13.3	–0.1	Christophe Lemaire	(Furioso)
Feb 22	Tokyo	February Stakes	I	1,600 m (Good)	16	2	2.7 (1)	3rd	1:34.6	0.0	Christophe Lemaire	Success Brocken
May 5	Funabashi	Kashiwa Kinen	JPN I	1,600 m (Sloppy)	13	11	1.8 (1)	2nd	1:36.0	0.1	Hiroyuki Uchida	Espoir City
2010 – eight-year-old season
Jun 30	Ohi	Teio Sho	JPN I	2,000 m (Good)	15	14	5.8 (4)	2nd	2:03.9	0.5	Norihiro Yokoyama	Furioso
Jul 19	Morioka	Mercury Cup	JPN III	2,000 m (Fast)	10	3	1.5 (1)	1st	2:04.8	–0.8	Norihiro Yokoyama	(Blue Lad)
Aug 12	Mombetsu	Breeders' Gold Cup	JPN II	2,000 m (Muddy)	13	4	1.2 (1)	2nd	2:03.7	0.7	Norihiro Yokoyama	Silk Mobius

Legend:
Dirt Turf

== Stud career and death ==
In the first year Kane Hekili became a stud, he suffered a hernia in his Omental foramen. This incident needing surgery and disrupted his breeding for awhile but he still managed to breed with 170 mares in that year. All in all, Kane Hekili conceived with 817 mares and produced 482 foals for five years as a stud. Kane Hekili's descendants include:

c = colt, f = filly

Foaled	Name	Sex	Major Wins
2012	Mitsuba	c	Kawasaki Kinen
2012	Altair	c	Hakurei Stakes, Pollux Stakes, Oasis Stakes
2013	London Town	c	Elm Stakes, Saga Kinen, Korea Cup (2x)
2014	Dios Corrida	c	Capella Stakes
2014	Superstition	c	Doei Kinen, Mizuho Sho
2015	A Shin Cerrado	c	Kazusa Stakes
2015	T O Energy	c	Hyogo Championship

On May 27, 2016, Kane Hekili died due to an accident during breeding in Yushun Stallion Station.

== Pedigree ==
Pedigree of Kane Hekili (JPN), 2002
Sire Fuji Kiseki (JPN) 1992	Sunday Silence (USA); 1986	Halo	Hail to Reason
Sire Fuji Kiseki (JPN) 1992	Sunday Silence (USA); 1986	Halo	Cosmah
Sire Fuji Kiseki (JPN) 1992	Sunday Silence (USA); 1986	Wishing Well	Understanding
Sire Fuji Kiseki (JPN) 1992	Sunday Silence (USA); 1986	Wishing Well	Mountain Flower
Sire Fuji Kiseki (JPN) 1992	Millracer (USA); 1983	Le Fabuleux	Wild Risk
Sire Fuji Kiseki (JPN) 1992	Millracer (USA); 1983	Le Fabuleux	Anguar
Sire Fuji Kiseki (JPN) 1992	Millracer (USA); 1983	Marston's Mill	In Reality
Sire Fuji Kiseki (JPN) 1992	Millracer (USA); 1983	Marston's Mill	Millicent
Dam Life Out There (USA) 1992 FNo : 2-s	Deputy Minister (CAN); 1979	Vice Regent	Northern Dancer
Dam Life Out There (USA) 1992 FNo : 2-s	Deputy Minister (CAN); 1979	Vice Regent	Victoria Regina
Dam Life Out There (USA) 1992 FNo : 2-s	Deputy Minister (CAN); 1979	Mint Copy	Bunty's Flight
Dam Life Out There (USA) 1992 FNo : 2-s	Deputy Minister (CAN); 1979	Mint Copy	Shakney
Dam Life Out There (USA) 1992 FNo : 2-s	Silver Valley (USA); 1979	Mr. Prospector	Raise a Native
Dam Life Out There (USA) 1992 FNo : 2-s	Silver Valley (USA); 1979	Mr. Prospector	Gold Digger
Dam Life Out There (USA) 1992 FNo : 2-s	Silver Valley (USA); 1979	Seven Valleys	Road At Sea
Dam Life Out There (USA) 1992 FNo : 2-s	Silver Valley (USA); 1979	Seven Valleys	Proud Pied
