= Kyoto Kimpai =

Kyoto Kimpai 京都金杯
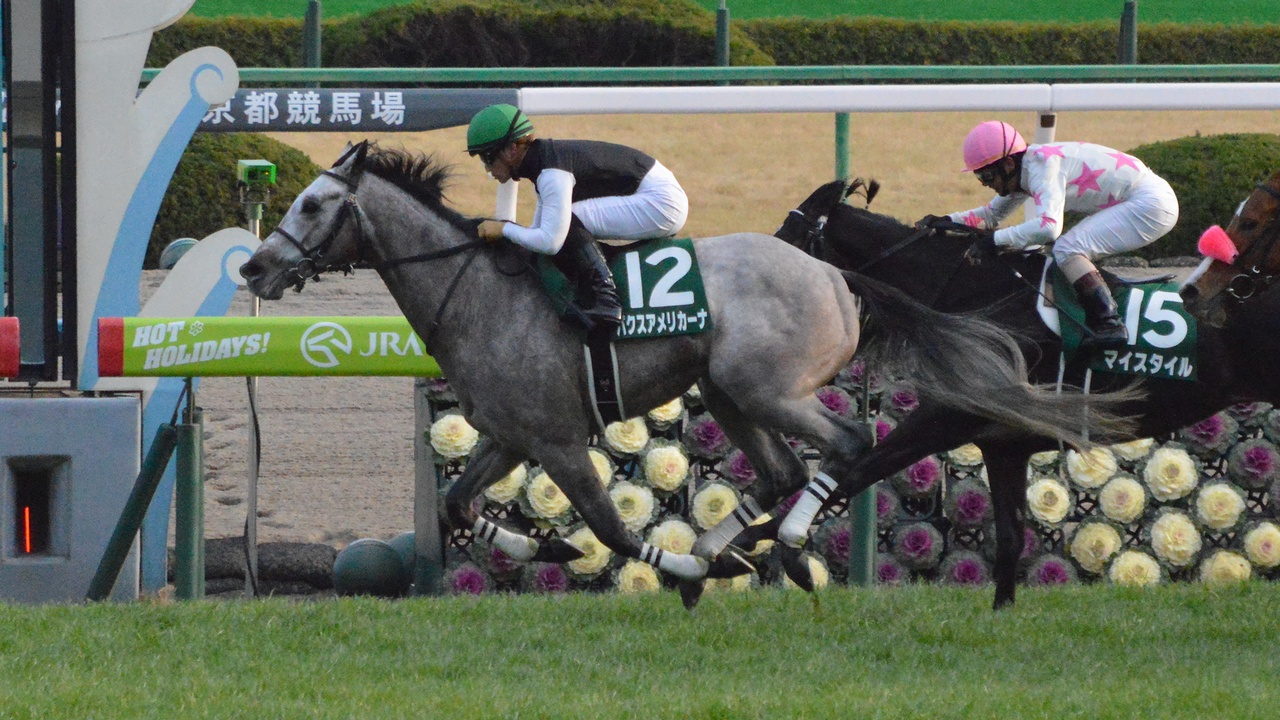
- Pax Americana wins the 2019 Kyoto Kimpai
- Class: Grade 3
- Location: Kyoto Racecourse
- Inaugurated: January 3, 1963
- Race type: Thoroughbred Flat racing

Race information
- Distance: 1600 metres
- Surface: Turf
- Track: Right-handed
- Qualification: 4-y-o+
- Weight: Handicap
- Purse: ¥ 92,980,000 (as of 2025): 1st: ¥ 43,000,000; 2nd: ¥ 17,000,000; 3rd: ¥ 11,000,000

The Kyoto Kimpai (京都金杯) is a Grade 3 (GIII) flat horse race in Japan.

== Background ==
The Kyoto Kimpai is a Grade III Thoroughbred handicap race in Japan, open to horses aged four years and older. It is held annually on January 5 (or January 6 if the 5th falls on a Friday) at Kyoto Racecourse over a distance of 1,600 meters on turf (outer course). Eligible entrants must have raced at least once and cannot be unraced or maiden horses. The field includes JRA-trained horses, up to two certified NAR (local) horses, and foreign-trained horses with priority entry. As a handicap race, weights are assigned based on each horse’s past performance. The first-place prize in 2026 is ¥43 million.

The race is officially titled the “Sports Nippon Sho Kyoto Kimpai”, sponsored by Sports Nippon newspaper, and the winner receives the Sports Nippon Newspaper Prize.

== History ==
The Kyoto Kimpai traces its origins to the “Geishun Sho (迎春賞)”, first run on January 3, 1963, for horses aged five and older over 2,000 meters on turf at Kyoto Racecourse. In 1966, it was renamed “Kin Hai (金盃)”, and in 1970, the spelling was updated to “Kimpai (金杯)”. From 1966 to 1995, it shared its name with the Nakayama Kimpai (run at Nakayama Racecourse), together forming Japan’s traditional New Year’s Day graded stakes doubleheader. To distinguish the two, the Kyoto version was officially renamed “Sports Nippon Sho Kyoto Kimpai” in 1996. Weight conditions shifted over time: it began as a handicap, switched to weight-for-age (別定) from 1966 to 1980, then reverted to handicap in 1981, where it has remained ever since. A transformation occurred in 2000, when the distance was shortened from 2,000m to 1,600m, repositioning the race as a key early-season test for milers rather than stayers.

The race was designated Grade III in 1984 under JRA’s grading system. International participation expanded gradually: foreign-bred horses were allowed from 1993, foreign-trained horses from 2006 (initially 4 runners, later 8 in 2007 and 9 in 2015), and NAR horses from 2020. Due to Kyoto Racecourse renovations, the race was temporarily relocated to Chukyo Racecourse from 2021 to 2023 and again in 2025.

Like its Nakayama counterpart, it is affectionately known by the fan saying: “Ichinen no kei wa Kinpai ni ari” (“The year’s plan lies in the Kimpai”).

== Past winners ==
Year	Winner	Age	Length (in m)	Jockey	Trainer	Owner	Time
1963	Suzu Riu	5	2000	Yoshito Matsumoto	Masaharu Hashimoto	Emiko Miyoshi	2:07.4
1964	Katsura Ace	5	2000	Yoshito Matsumoto	Masaharu Hashimoto	Ichitaro Maki	2:05.9
1965	Korai O	5	2000	Michio Ueda	Saburo Yoshida	Masayoshi Takada	2:04.7
1966	Keystone	4	2000	Shoji Yamamoto	Yoshitaro Matsuda	Yoshigoro Ito	2:05.8
1967	Yamaniryu	4	2000	Shigetada Takahashi	Tomie Kashiwagi	Motoo Kitazawa	2:04.7
1968	Atlas	4	2000	Kunihiko Take	Tameo Toyama	Shigeo Matsuoka	2:03.4
1969	Fine Rose	4	2000	Yoshinori Yanada	Juubee Tsubo	Hisahiro Yoshida	2:03.4
1970	Houun	4	2000	Yasuo Ikee	Keizo Umeuchi	Choichi Nakai	2:03.9
1971	Kei Takashi	6	2000	Yasuo Ikee	Kuniichi Asami	Keiji Uchida	2:07.2
1972	Fidole	4	2000	Hiroshi Takeda	Bungo Takeda	Kikue Ohara	2:07.8
1973	Yumond	4	2000	Yoichi Fukunaga	Bungo Takeda	Masayuki Atarashi	2:08.3
1974	Naoki	5	2000	Shoji Sasaki	Yasuzo Tanaka	Sakurayama Hose Co. Ltd.	2:01.4
1975	Hakusan Homare	5	2000	Kazuaki Kubo	Takeru Yoshinaga	Katsu Fuwa	2:04.0
1976	Three York	5	2000	Takayoshi Deguchi	Saichi Suwa	Nagai Shoji Co. Ltd.	2:04.4
1977	Koichi Saburo	4	2000	Yoshito Matsumoto	Hozumi Shono	Katsura Tochi Co. Ltd.	2:02.8
1978	Linear Queen	4	2000	Yukiharu Matsuda	Yoshitaro Matsuda	Tatsuzo Oketani	2:04.0
1979	Inter Gushiken	4	2000	Kunihiko Take	Ryoichi Hisako	Masao Matsuoka	2:02.7
1980	Great Titan	5	2000	Kunihiko Take	Saburo Yoshida	Sadajiro Nagasoko	2:03.4
1981	Western George	5	2000	Tadashi Kayo	Shuji Kitahashi	Nishikawa Shoji Co. Ltd.	2:00.9
1982	Tama Top	5	2000	Shigeo Koshoji	Tatsuo Natsumura	Masao Tamai	2:03.2
1983	Miss Radical	4	2000	Hidetaka Otonashi	Ryohei Tanaka	Yuichi Odagiri	2:02.5
1984	Long Grace	4	2000	Seiki Tabara	Minoru Kobayashi	Choichi Nakai	2:03.6
1985	Mejiro Thomas	4	2000	Yoshiyuki Muramoto	Yasuo Ikee	Mejiro Farm Ltd.	2:02.3
1986	Eiko French	5	2000	Nobuyuki Tajima	Isao Yasuda	Kenichi Ikeuchi	2:03.8
1987	Dokan Yashima	7	2000	Eiji Shimizu	Akira Shikato	Arai Kogyo Co. Ltd.	2:03.2
1988	Tamamo Cross	4	2000	Katsumi Minai	Isami Obara	Tamamo Co. Ltd.	2:03.7
1989	Katsu Tokushin	4	2000	Mikio Matsunaga	Isao Yasuda	Tsuneroku Watanabe	2:00.5
1990	Osaichi George	4	2000	Katsuhide Maruyama	Kazumi Domon	Choichi Node	2:01.9
1991	Dai Yusaku	6	2000	Shigeyuki Kumazawa	Shigeharu Naito	Kohei Hashimoto	2:00.1
1992	White Arrow	5	2000	Seiki Tabara	Yukiharu Ono	Higashiyama Horse Co. Ltd.	2:02.2
1993	El Casa River	4	2000	Taisei Yamada	Ryohei Tanaka	Clear Co. Ltd.	2:01.4
1994	Eishin Tennessee	5	2000	Seiki Tabara	Masanori Sakaguchi	Toyomitsu Hirai	2:02.8
1995	Wako Chikako	5	2000	Olivier Peslier	Yuji Ito	Takao Ishida	1:59.7
1996	T.M. Jumbo	5	2000	Hiroshi Kawachi	Tadashi Fuse	Masatsugu Takezono	1:59.7
1997	Ishino Sunday	4	2000	Hirofumi Shii	Kenji Yamauchi	Ishijima Co. Ltd.	2:02.3
1998	Midnight Bet	4	2000	Olivier Peslier	Hiroyuki Nagahama	Shadai Race Horse Ltd.	2:00.6
1999	Hikari Sarment	5	2000	Hiroshi Kawachi	Tsugio Yanagida	Takanori Toyama	1:59.5
2000	Kyoei March	6	1600	Shinichiro Akiyama	Akihiko Nomura	Tomee Matsuoka	1:33.4
2001	Daitaku Riva	4	1600	Mikio Matsunaga	Kojiro Hashiguchi	Taiyo Farm Ltd.	1:33.4
2002	Daitaku Riva	5	1600	Yutaka Take	Kojiro Hashiguchi	Taiyo Farm Ltd.	1:33.8
2003	Sidewinder	5	1600	Hirofumi Shii	Shuji Kitahashi	Kyoei Co. Ltd.	1:33.7
2004	My Sole Sound	5	1600	Masaru Honda	Katsuichi Nishiura	Kiyoshi Sano	1:33.3
2005	Hat Trick	4	1600	Yutaka Take	Katsuhiko Sumii	Carrot Farm Ltd.	1:34.0
2006	Big Planet	4	1600	Ryuji Wada	Katsumi Minai	Big Co. Ltd.	1:34.0
2007	Meiner Scherti	4	1600	Yoshitomi Shibata	Ryuichi Inaba	Thoroughbred Club Ruffian Co. Ltd.	1:33.9
2008	Eishin Deputy	6	1600	Yasunari Iwata	Akira Nomoto	Toyomitsu Hirai	1:33.6
2009	Tamamo Support	6	1600	Akihide Tsumura	Kenichi Fujioka	Tamamo Co. Ltd.	1:32.9
2010	Live Concert	6	1600	Yasunari Iwata	Toshiaki Shirai	Green Fields Co. Ltd.	1:34.1
2011	Silport	6	1600	Futoshi Komaki	Masato Nihizono	Takeo Hyakuman	1:33.4
2012	Meiner Lacrima	6	1600	Masami Matsuoka	Hiroyuki Uehara	Thoroughbred Club Ruffian Co. Ltd.	1:32.9
2013	Danon Shark	5	1600	Christophe Lemaire	Ryuji Okubo	Danox Co. Ltd.	1:33.5
2014	Extra End	5	1600	Christophe Lemaire	Katsuhiko Sumii	Shadai Race Horse Ltd.	1:32.5
2015	Win Full Bloom	4	1600	Kenichi Ikezoe	Hiroshi Miyamoto	Win Co. Ltd.	1:32.8
2016	Win Primera	6	1600	Yuga Kawada	Ryuji Okubo	Win Co. Ltd.	1:33.0
2017	Air Spinel	4	1600	Yutaka Take	Kazuhide Sasada	Lucky Field Co. Ltd.	1:32.8
2018	Black Moon	6	1600	Yutaka Take	Katsuichi Nishiura	Him Rock Racing	1:34.3
2019	Pax Americana	4	1600	Yuga Kawada	Mitsumasa Nakauchida	Sanshisuimei Co. Ltd.	1:34.9
2020	Sound Chiara	5	1600	Kohei Matsuyama	Akio Adachi	Yuichi Masuda	1:34.0
2021^{[a]}	Cadence Call	5	1600	Yasunari Iwata	Takayuki Yasuda	Sunday Racing Ltd.	1:33.1
2022^{[a]}	Zadar	6	1600	Kohei Matsuyama	Masahiro Otake	Carrot Farm Ltd.	1:32.9
2023^{[a]}	Elusive Panther	5	1600	Mirai Iwata	Takashi Kubota	Tsunefumi Kusama	1:32.7
2024	Corepetiteur	4	1600	Yasunari Iwata	Kazuya Nakatake	Makoto Kato	1:33.8
2025^{[b]}	Sakura Toujours	8	1600	Rachel King	Noriyuki Hori	Sakura Commerce Co. Ltd.	1:33.5
2026	Buena Onda	5	1600	Yuga Kawada	Naosuke Sugai	Kaneko Makoto Holdings Co. Ltd.	1:33.7

^{a} The 2020, 2021 and 2022 runnings took place at Chukyo while Kyoto was closed for redevelopment.
^{b} The 2025 runnings took place at Chukyo while Hanshin was closed for redevelopment.

== See also ==
- Horse racing in Japan
- List of Japanese flat horse races

=== Netkeiba ===
- 1994 en, 1995 en, 1996 en, 1997 en, 1998 en, 1999 en, 2000 en, 2001 en, 2002 en, 2003 en, 2004 en, 2005 en, 2006 en, 2007 en, 2008 en, 2009 en, 2010 en, 2011 en, 2012 en, 2013 en, 2014 en, 2015 en, 2016 en, 2017 en, 2018 en, 2019 en, 2020 en, 2021 en, 2022 en, 2023 en, 2024 en, 2025 en, 2026 en
