= Mizusawa Racecourse =

Racecourse in Iwate, Japan

Mizusawa Racecourse 水沢競馬場
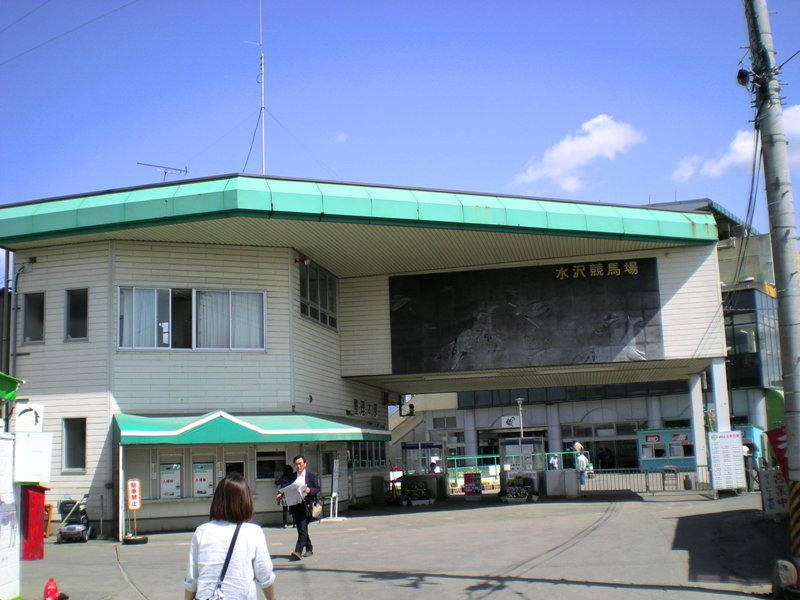
- Interactive map of Mizusawa Racecourse 水沢競馬場
- Location: 岩手県奥州市水沢姉体町字阿久戸1-2
- Coordinates: 39.1299°N 141.1705°E
- Owned by: Iwate Prefecture Horse Racing Association
- Date opened: 1901 (Original); 1965 (Current location)
- Race type: Flat
- Course type: Dirt
- Notable races: Derby Grand Prix

Mizusawa Racecourse (Japanese: 水沢競馬場) is located in Ōshū, Iwate Prefecture, Japan. It is the one of two racetracks located in Iwate Prefecture, alongside Morioka Racecourse.

== Physical attributes ==
The track is right-handed (clockwise) and can be altered to fit races of 850m up to 2500m.

The admission fee is 200 yen.

The racecourse is mostly used for local races, with bigger races usually being held at Morioka Racecourse.

== Notable races ==
Month	Race	Distance	Age/Sex
January	Touka Sho	Dirt 2000m	3-4yo
January	Tokei Nisei Kinen	Dirt 1600m	4-5yo
April	Hidaka Sho	Dirt 1600m	3yo +
May	Shian Mor Kinen	Dirt 1600m	3-4yo
June	Tohoku Yushun	Dirt 2000m	3yo
June	Michinoku Daishouten	Dirt 2000m	3-4yo
June	Kurikoma Sho	Dirt 2000m	3yo +
August	Beautiful Dreamer Cup	Dirt 1900m	3-4yo
December	Kitakamigawa Daishouten	Dirt 2500m	3yo +
