= Oguri Cap =

Japanese-bred Thoroughbred racehorse

Oguri Cap オグリキャップ
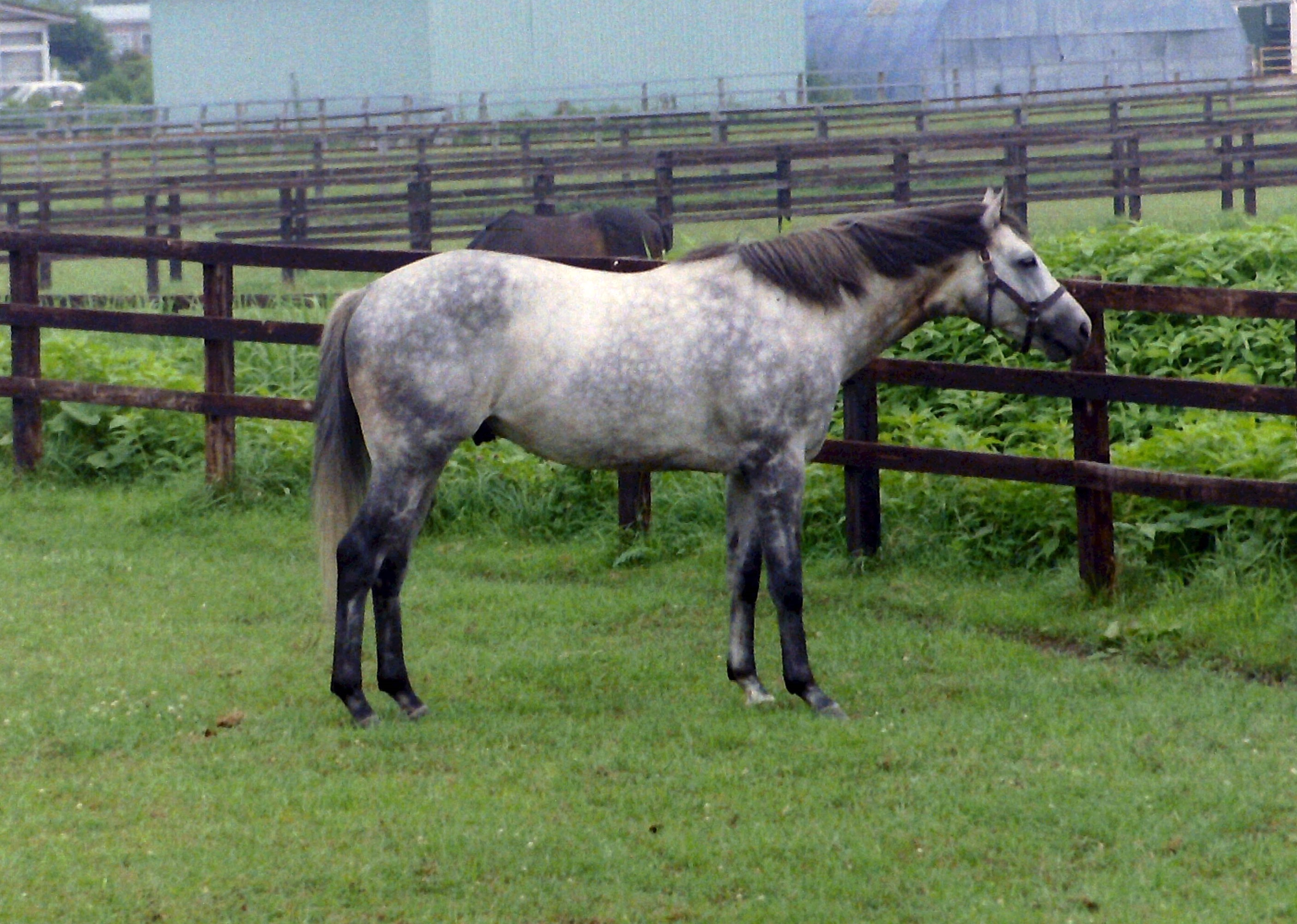
- Oguri Cap in retirement in 1995
- Breed: Thoroughbred
- Sire: Dancing Cap
- Grandsire: Native Dancer
- Dam: White Narubi
- Damsire: Silver Shark
- Sex: Stallion
- Foaled: March 27, 1985
- Died: July 3, 2010 (aged 25)
- Country: Japan
- Colour: Gray
- Breeder: Inaba Bokujō
- Owner: Koichi Oguri → Isoo Sahashi → Toshinori Kondo
- Racing colours
- Trainer: Masao Sumi → Tsutomu Setoguchi
- Jockey: Katsumi Ando; Hiroshi Kawachi; Katsumi Minai; Yutaka Take
- Record: 32: 22-6-1; NAR: 12: 10-2-0; JRA: 20: 12-4-1
- Earnings: 912,512,000 JPY

Major wins
- Pegasus Stakes (1988); Mainichi Hai (1988); Kyoto Yonsai Tokubetsu (1988); New Zealand Trophy (1988); Takamatsunomiya Hai (1988); Mainichi Okan (1988, 1989); Arima Kinen (1988, 1990); Sankei Sho All Comers (1989); Mile Championship (1989); Yasuda Kinen (1990)

Awards
- JRA Award for Best Three-Year-Old Colt (1988); JRA Special Award (1989); JRA Award for Best Older Male Horse (1990); NAR Grand Prix Special Award (1990); Japanese Horse of the Year (1990)

Honours
- Japan Racing Association Hall of Fame (1991)

Oguri Cap (Japanese: オグリキャップ, Hepburn: Oguri Kyappu; 27 March 1985 – 3 July 2010) was a Japanese Thoroughbred racehorse and stud, sired by Dancing Cap. Oguri Cap was inducted into the Japan Racing Association Hall of Fame in 1991. A horse from the countryside who found success at the national level, he was known as a member of the "Heisei Big Three", a trio of racehorses who reignited interest in horse racing in Japan alongside Super Creek and Inari One.

== Background ==
Oguri Cap was a grey stallion foaled on 27 March 1985. His sire Dancing Cap was an American-bred racehorse who had five wins out of 19 starts in the United Kingdom alongside one second place finish in France. Oguri Cap's grandsire Native Dancer was a highly successful American champion racehorse and sire, and is a National Museum of Racing Hall of Fame inductee. He is considered to be "all but universal in North American pedigrees". Dancing Cap and Oguri Cap's dam White Narubi were descendants of Nasrullah and undefeated Italian racehorse Nearco. Both horses are among the most influential sires of the 20th century.

He was bred by Funao Inaba on the small and family-owned Inaba Farm in Hokkaido, Japan. When he was foaled, he was unable to stand up whereas healthy newborns should be capable of standing on their own within one hour. This was due to his front left leg being considerably bowed outwards. The farm's staff had to hold Oguri Cap up in order for him to be breastfed. However, White Narubi sometimes refused to breastfeed him and did not produce an adequate amount of milk. Oguri Cap ended up developing a massive appetite for what food he could find including weeds. Due to this abnormal diet and lack of milk, he was thin and unappealing as a foal. In the hopes of him growing up healthily, Inaba named the foal "Hatsuratsu" meaning "lively" or "vigorous". He eventually successfully remedied Oguri Cap's bowed leg with hoof trimming. By the end of his second year, Oguri Cap had grown into a healthy, fully capable horse.

Oguri Cap's large appetite remained a trait of his for the rest of his life, and he was lethargic outside of racing. When reflecting about Oguri Cap's career, the veteran racing journalist Yoshiko Suzuki wrote:

Oguri Cap seemed to have no interest in anything but eating and sleeping at the stable. He wouldn’t lift his head from the feed trough until he had finished everything in it. And once the feed was gone, he would go to sleep. ... One time, a female journalist friend of mine visited the stable for an interview and, after getting permission, took a photo with Oguri. When Oguri poked his head out of the stall, he rested his head on my friend’s shoulder and fell right asleep.

— Yoshiko Suzuki, Oguri Cap: A Fond Memory That Somehow Echoes Gold Ship

== Racing career ==
In May 1987, Oguri Cap made his debut at Kasamatsu Racecourse in Gifu Prefecture. After winning 9 starts in 11 races, including 7 consecutive victories and 4 stakes wins, he was transferred to the ownership of Chuo Horse Racing in January 1988. He recorded 13 more wins, including 4 Grade I stakes, 4 Grade II stakes, and 4 Grade III stakes. Some of his biggest wins included the 1989 Mile Championship (GI), two-time wins in the Arima Kinen (Grand Prix) (GI), and a win in the 1990 Yasuda Kinen (GI). He also won the New Zealand Trophy (GII), the Takamatsunomiya Hai (GII) and won the Mainichi Ōkan (GII) twice.

Oguri Cap was known for his rivalry with fellow gray-haired horse of the year Tamamo Cross, with whom he competed three times at the 1988 Tenno Sho (Autumn), Japan Cup, and Arima Kinen.

== Retirement ==
After retirement in 1991, Oguri Cap was sent to the Yushun Stallion Station to stand stud. He was not able to produce any racers of his caliber, and in 2007 he was retired from stud duty. After retirement, he lived as a pensioned stallion at the Yushun Stallion Station. On 3 July 2010, he fractured one of the tibias in his legs in an apparent pasture accident, and was subsequently euthanized.

== Popularity ==
Oguri Cap had a major impact on the Japanese horse-racing scene, thanks in no small part to his humble beginnings.

Due to starting his career in regional races, his move to the National scene came too late for him to be registered for the 1988 season of the Japanese Classic races, specifically the Satsuki Shō, the Tōkyō Yūshun (Japanese Derby) and the Kikuka Shō, collectively called the "Japanese Triple Crown". However, as Oguri Cap continued to win race after race, there was a popular outcry to allow him to participate in the classics despite missing the deadline. While the Japan Racing Association (JRA) stood firm against allowing Oguri to participate, they did soon after change their rules to be less strict on registration, allowing late entries and even foreign-born horses to run in the classics, though with a hefty fee attached. Two subsequent beneficiaries of this change would be fellow JRA Hall of Fame inductees T. M. Opera O and Kitasan Black.

Oguri Cap was extremely popular with fans, earning the nickname "Idol Horse", thanks to drawing crowds who watched the races for more than just race-betting, and was one of the first racehorses to have plush dolls made in his image, a form of merchandise that is now commonplace.

== Awards ==
In 1988, Oguri Cap won the JRA Award for Best Three-Year-Old Colt and won the JRA Special Award the following year. In 1990, he won both the JRA Award for Best Older Male Horse and Japanese Horse of the Year. He was inducted into the JRA Hall of Fame in 1991.

He was nicknamed "Oguri" and for his performance, he was also nicknamed the "Gray-Haired Monster".

== Legacy ==
A life-sized statue of Oguri Cap was erected at the Yushun Memorial Park in Niikappu, Hokkaido one year after the horse's death.

In addition, another Oguri Cap statue was erected at Kasamatsu Racecourse and later refreshed in 2019. Alongside the statue, Oguri Cap's mane is also on display there.

== In popular culture ==
In the manga and anime series Nichijou, the character Mai Minakami owns a dog named Oguri Cap.

=== Umamusume: Pretty Derby ===
An anthropomorphized version of Oguri Cap appears as a character in the Japanese multimedia franchise Umamusume: Pretty Derby, voiced by Tomoyo Takayanagi. She is depicted as an introverted, simple-minded ashen-haired girl with a large appetite, often being seen eating comically large portions of food.

Originally appearing as a minor character in the anime and a playable character in the game itself, Oguri Cap's real-life career would later be dramatized in Umamusume's spin-off manga series Umamusume: Cinderella Gray. Produced by Junnosuke Itō, written by Masafumi Sugiura and illustrated by Taiyō Kuzumi, the manga ran in Shueisha's Weekly Young Jump from June 2020 to December 2025, with twenty-one volumes having been released.

Cinderella Gray received an anime television series adaptation, airing in two split cours. The series, which focused from Oguri Cap's debut at the Kasamatsu racecourse in 1987 up to the 1988 Arima Kinen, aired its first cour from April to June 2025, with the second cour airing from October to December of the same year.

== Racing statistics ==
In total, Oguri Cap raced 32 races in his career, with 22 wins and 4 Grade I victories.

Date	Age	Distance (Condition)	Race	Class	Course	Field	HN	Odds (Favourite)	Finish	Time	Winning (Losing) Margin	Jockey	Winner (2nd Place)	Ref
19 May 1987	2	Dirt 800 m (Firm)	Two Year Old Debut		Kasamatsu	10	5	-- (2nd)	2nd	0:50.1	(neck)	Tatsuhiko Aoki	March Tosho	
2 Jun 1987	2	Dirt 800 m (Firm)	Two Year Old		Kasamatsu	7	1	1.1 (1st)	1st	0:51.1	4 lengths	Kazunari Kato	(North Hero)	
15 Jun 1987	2	Dirt 800 m (Soft)	Two Year Old		Kasamatsu	9	8	-- (1st)	1st	0:49.8	6 lengths	Tatsuhiko Aoki	(Fate Charles)	
26 Jul 1987	2	Dirt 800 m (Firm)	Two Year Old		Kasamatsu	7	7	-- (1st)	2nd	0:50.3	(neck)	Kazunari Kato	March Tosho	
12 Aug 1987	2	Dirt 800 m (Firm)	Two Year Old		Kasamatsu	8	7	2.4 (1st)	1st	0:49.7	2 1/2 lengths	Kazunari Kato	(March Tosho)	
30 Aug 1987	2	Dirt 1400 m (Firm)	Akikaze Junior		Kasamatsu	10	5	-- (1st)	1st	1:30.3	4 lengths	Katsumi Ando	(March Tosho)	
4 Oct 1987	2	Dirt 1400 m (Firm)	Junior Crown		Kasamatsu	9	5	1.2 (1st)	1st	1:29.4	nose	Katsumi Ando	(March Tosho)	
14 Oct 1987	2	Turf 1200 m (Firm)	Chukyo Hai		Chukyo	12	3	1.5 (1st)	1st	1:10.8	2 lengths	Katsumi Ando	(Ardent Love)	
4 Nov 1987	2	Dirt 1400 m (Heavy)	Chunichi Sports Hai		Nagoya	12	4	1.2 (1st)	1st	1:29.8	2 1/2 lengths	Katsumi Ando	(Hallow Princess)	
7 Dec 1987	2	Dirt 1600 m (Firm)	Shiwasu Tokubetsu		Kasamatsu	10	9	1.7 (1st)	1st	1:44.4	6 lengths	Katsumi Ando	(Young Oja)	
29 Dec 1987	2	Dirt 1600 m (Firm)	Junior Grand Prix		Kasamatsu	10	5	1.1 (1st)	1st	1:45.0	4 lengths	Katsumi Ando	(Tokai Shark)	
10 Jan 1988	3	Dirt 1600 m (Heavy)	Gold Junior		Kasamatsu	10	6	1.1 (1st)	1st	1:41.8	2 1/2 lengths	Katsumi Ando	(March Tosho)	
6 Mar 1988	3	Turf 1600 m (Firm)	Pegasus Stakes	GIII	Hanshin	10	4	3.8 (2nd)	1st	1:35.6	3 lengths	Hiroshi Kawachi	(Rugger Black)	
27 Mar 1988	3	Turf 2000 m (Soft)	Mainichi Hai	GIII	Hanshin	10	10	2.2 (1st)	1st	2:04.8	neck	Hiroshi Kawachi	(Foundry Dictor)	
8 May 1988	3	Turf 2000 m (Good)	Kyoto Yonsai Tokubetsu	GIII	Kyoto	15	15	1.3 (1st)	1st	2:03.6	5 lengths	Katsumi Minai	(Koei Spurt)	
5 Jun 1988	3	Turf 1600 m (Firm)	New Zealand Trophy	GII	Tokyo	13	11	1.2 (1st)	1st	R1:34.0	7 lengths	Hiroshi Kawachi	(Lindo Hoshi)	
10 Jul 1988	3	Turf 2000 m (Firm)	Takamatsunomiya Hai	GII	Chukyo	8	2	1.2 (1st)	1st	R1:59.0	1 1/4 lengths	Hiroshi Kawachi	(Land Hiryu)	
9 Oct 1988	3	Turf 1800 m (Good)	Mainichi Okan	GII	Tokyo	11	8	1.7 (1st)	1st	1:49.2	1 1/4 lengths	Hiroshi Kawachi	(Sirius Symboli)	
30 Oct 1988	3	Turf 2000 m (Firm)	Tenno Sho (Autumn)	GI	Tokyo	13	1	2.1 (1st)	2nd	1:59.0	(1 1/4 lengths)	Hiroshi Kawachi	Tamamo Cross	
27 Nov 1988	3	Turf 2400 m (Firm)	Japan Cup	GI	Tokyo	14	8	6.9 (3rd)	3rd	2:25.8	(1 3/4 lengths)	Hiroshi Kawachi	Pay the Butler	
25 Dec 1988	3	Turf 2500 m (Firm)	Arima Kinen	GI	Nakayama	13	10	3.7 (2nd)	1st	2:33.9	1/2 length	Yukio Okabe	(Tamamo Cross)	
17 Sep 1989	4	Turf 2200 m (Firm)	Sankei Sho All Comers	GIII	Nakayama	13	11	1.4 (1st)	1st	R2:12.4	1 3/4 lengths	Katsumi Minai	(All Dash)	
8 Oct 1989	4	Turf 1800 m (Good)	Mainichi Okan	GII	Tokyo	8	6	1.4 (1st)	1st	1:46.7	nose	Katsumi Minai	(Inari One)	
29 Oct 1989	4	Turf 2000 m (Firm)	Tenno Sho (Autumn)	GI	Tokyo	14	4	1.9 (1st)	2nd	1:59.1	(neck)	Katsumi Minai	Super Creek	
19 Nov 1989	4	Turf 1600 m (Firm)	Mile Championship	GI	Kyoto	17	1	1.3 (1st)	1st	1:34.6	nose	Katsumi Minai	(Bamboo Memory)	
26 Nov 1989	4	Turf 2400 m (Firm)	Japan Cup	GI	Tokyo	15	3	5.3 (2nd)	2nd	2:22.2	(neck)	Katsumi Minai	Horlicks	
24 Dec 1989	4	Turf 2500 m (Firm)	Arima Kinen	GI	Nakayama	16	1	1.8 (1st)	5th	2:32.5	(5 lengths)	Katsumi Minai	Inari One	
13 May 1990	5	Turf 1600 m (Firm)	Yasuda Kinen	GI	Tokyo	16	9	1.4 (1st)	1st	R1:32.4	2 lengths	Yutaka Take	(Yaeno Muteki)	
10 Jun 1990	5	Turf 2200 m (Firm)	Takarazuka Kinen	GI	Hanshin	10	6	1.2 (1st)	2nd	2:14.6	(3 1/2 lengths)	Junichiro Oka	Osaichi George	
28 Oct 1990	5	Turf 2000 m (Firm)	Tenno Sho (Autumn)	GI	Tokyo	18	12	2.0 (1st)	6th	1:58.9	(5 lengths)	Sueo Masuzawa	Yaeno Muteki	
25 Nov 1990	5	Turf 2400 m (Firm)	Japan Cup	GI	Tokyo	15	7	7.3 (4th)	11th	2:24.1	(5 1/2 lengths)	Sueo Masuzawa	Better Loosen Up	
23 Dec 1990	5	Turf 2500 m (Firm)	Arima Kinen	GI	Nakayama	16	8	5.5 (4th)	1st	2:34.2	3/4 length	Yutaka Take	(Mejiro Ryan)	

- R in the chart and the time written in red indicates the horse finished in record time.

== Pedigree ==
Through Never Say Die, Oguri Cap was a descendant of War Admiral and Man o' War and through Nasrullah, he was a descendant of Nearco.

Pedigree of Oguri Cap (JPN), gray colt, 27 March 1985
Sire Dancing Cap (USA) (1968)	Native Dancer (1950)	Polynesian	Unbreakable
Sire Dancing Cap (USA) (1968)	Native Dancer (1950)	Polynesian	Black Polly
Sire Dancing Cap (USA) (1968)	Native Dancer (1950)	Geisha	Discovery
Sire Dancing Cap (USA) (1968)	Native Dancer (1950)	Geisha	Miyako
Sire Dancing Cap (USA) (1968)	Merry Madcap (GB) (1962)	Grey Sovereign	Nasrullah
Sire Dancing Cap (USA) (1968)	Merry Madcap (GB) (1962)	Grey Sovereign	Kong
Sire Dancing Cap (USA) (1968)	Merry Madcap (GB) (1962)	Croft Lady (IRE)	Golden Cloud (GB)
Sire Dancing Cap (USA) (1968)	Merry Madcap (GB) (1962)	Croft Lady (IRE)	Land of Hope (GB)
Dam White Narubi (JPN) (1974)	Silver Shark (IRE) (1963)	Buisson Ardent (FR)	Relic (USA)
Dam White Narubi (JPN) (1974)	Silver Shark (IRE) (1963)	Buisson Ardent (FR)	Rose o'Lynn (IRE)
Dam White Narubi (JPN) (1974)	Silver Shark (IRE) (1963)	Palsaka (GB)	Palestine
Dam White Narubi (JPN) (1974)	Silver Shark (IRE) (1963)	Palsaka (GB)	Masaka (IRE)
Dam White Narubi (JPN) (1974)	Never Narubi (1969)	Never Beat (GB)	Never Say Die (USA)
Dam White Narubi (JPN) (1974)	Never Narubi (1969)	Never Beat (GB)	Bride Elect
Dam White Narubi (JPN) (1974)	Never Narubi (1969)	Senju	Guersant (FR)
Dam White Narubi (JPN) (1974)	Never Narubi (1969)	Senju	Star Narubi (Family 7-d)

== See also ==
- List of racehorses
