= JRA Award for Best Dirt Horse =

Japanese thoroughbred horse racing award

Japanese Best Dirt Horse is a title awarded annually by the Japan Racing Association (JRA) to an outstanding horse of that category in horse racing in Japan. Since 1987 the honor has been part of the JRA Awards.

== Records ==
Most successful horse (2 wins):

- Wing Arrow – 1998, 2000
- Admire Don – 2003, 2004
- Kane Hekili – 2005, 2008
- Espoir City – 2009, 2010
- Lemon Pop – 2023, 2024

Leading trainer (2 wins):

- Katsumi Minai – Wing Arrow (1998, 2000)
- Hiroyoshi Matsuda – Admire Don (2003, 2004)
- Sei Ishizaka – Alondite (2006), Vermilion (2007)
- Katsuhiko Sumii - Kane Hekili (2005, 2008)
- Akio Adachi – Espoir City (2009, 2010)
- Kunihide Matsuda – Kurofune (2001), Belshazzar (2013)
- Hiroyasu Tanaka – Lemon Pop (2023, 2024)

Leading owner (4 wins):

- Makoto Kaneko – Wing Arrow (2000), Kurofune (2001), Kane Hekili (2005, 2008)

== Winners ==
Year	Horse	Trainer	Owner	Age
1987	No Award
1988	No Award
1989	Dyna Letter	Toshio Nihon'yanagi	Shadai Racing	5
1990	Caribbean Song	Osamu Kato Hajime	Ogifuji Ranch	4
1991	Narita Falcon	Kentaro Nakao	Hidenori Yamaji	4
1992	No Award
1993	Meisho Homura	Takahashi Shigetada	Yoshio Matsumoto	5
1994	Fujino Makken O	Yoshio Nakamura	Hiroshi Nakamura	3
1995	Lively Mount	Fujio Shibata	Tetsuro Kato	4
1996	Hokuto Vega	Takao Nakano	Kanamori Shoji Mori	6
1997	No Award
1998	Wing Arrow	Katsumi Minai	Minoru Ikeda	3
1999	No Award
2000	Wing Arrow	Katsumi Minai	Makoto Kaneko	5
2001	Kurofune	Kunihide Matsuda	Makoto Kaneko	5
2002	Gold Allure	Yasutoshi Ikee	Shadai Racing	4
2003	Admire Don	Hiroyoshi Matsuda	Riichi Kondo	4
2004	Admire Don	Hiroyoshi Matsuda	Riichi Kondo	5
2005	Kane Hekili	Katsuhiko Sumii	Makoto Kaneko	3
2006	Alondite	Sei Ishizaka	Carrot Farm Co.	3
2007	Vermilion	Sei Ishizaka	Sunday Racing	5
2008	Kane Hekili	Katsuhiko Sumii	Makoto Kaneko	6
2009	Espoir City	Akio Adachi	Yushun Horse	4
2010	Espoir City	Akio Adachi	Yushun Horse	5
2011	Transcend	Yasuda Takayuki	Koji Maeda	5
2012	Nihonpiro Ours	Yuki Ohashi	Hyakutaro Kobayashi	5
2013	Belshazzar	Kunihide Matsuda	Shadai Race Horse	5
2014	Hokko Tarumae	Katsuichi Nishiura	Michiaki Yabe	5
2015	Copano Rickey	Akira Murayama	Sachiaki Kobayashi	5
2016	Sound True	Noboru Takagi	Hiroshi Yamada	6
2017	Gold Dream	Osamu Hirata	Katsumi Yoshida	4
2018	Le Vent Se Leve	Kiyoshi Hagiwara	G1 Racing	3
2019	Chrysoberyl	Hidetaka Otonashi	Carrot Farm	3
2020	Chuwa Wizard	Ryuji Okubo	Shinobu Nakanishi	5
2021	T O Keynes	Daisuke Takayanagi	Tomoya Ozasa	4
2022	Cafe Pharoah	Noriyuki Hori	Koichi NIshikawa	5
2023	Lemon Pop	Hiroyasu Tanaka	Godolphin	5
2024	Lemon Pop	Hiroyasu Tanaka	Godolphin	6
2025	Forever Young	Yoshito Yahagi	Susumu Fujita	4
