= Derby Grand Prix =

Japanese thoroughbred race

- Location: Mizusawa Racecourse
- Inaugurated: 1986
- Final run: 2023
- Race type: Thoroughbred - Flat racing

Race information
- Distance: 2,000 meters
- Surface: Dirt
- Qualification: Three-years-old
- Purse: ¥40,000,000; 1st: ¥ 10,000,000

The Derby Grand Prix (in Japanese: ダービーグランプリ) was a Japanese Domestic Grade 1 (Jpn1) horserace for three-year-old Thoroughbreds in the Iwate Prefecture Horse Racing Association.

== Race details ==
The race was established in 1986. It was for 4-year-olds, but changed to 3-year-olds in 2001.

The race was graded as a Grade-1 race in 1997 and was then moved down to Grade-M1 in 2016.

The race took place at Morioka Racecourse from 1996-2011.

The race was discontinued in 2023 as it was merged to the Kozukata Sho, which was given a JpnII grade and status as a trial race for the Japan Dirt Classic.

== Winners since 2014 ==
Year	Winner	Jockey	Trainer	Owner	Time
2014	Dragon Ear	Hiroto Yoshihara	Kenichi Takatsuki		2:07.4
2015	Studium	Satoshi Ishizaki	Yoshiyuki Kano		2:07.5
2016	Trovao	Daisuke Mijima	Katsunori Arayama		2:08.0
2017	Superstition	Ryu Abe	Hideki Kadokawa		2:08.2
2018	Chaiyaphum	Shinobu Murakami	Yuki Chiba		2:12.2
2019	Rinno Legend	Makoto Okabe	Kazuhiro Hayashi	Masao Hayashi	2:07.0
2020	Freccia Bianca	Ryo Takamatsu	Koki Chiba	Kazuo Okubo	2:05.7
2021	Giga King	Joji Wada	Takahiro Inamasu	Tomohiro Ozaki	2:06.8
2022	S'il Te Plait	Yamato Ishikawa	Noboru Yonekawa	Kumiko Hara	2:04.9
2023	Mick Fire	Norifumi Mikamoto	Kazuo Watanabe	Koichi Hoshika	2:03.0

== Past winners ==
Past winners include:

- 1986:Tomi Alco
- 1987:Star Doll
- 1988: Aeroplane
- 1989: Swift Say Die
- 1990: Sand Reason
- 1991: Riverstone King
- 1992: Tomishino Porunga
- 1993: Mr. Rudolf
- 1994: Black Cross
- 1995: Loui Boss Gold
- 1996: Ishino Sunday
- 1997: T.M. Megaton
- 1998: Narita Homare
- 1999: Taiki Herakles
- 2000: Regular Member
- 2001: Mugamuchu
- 2002: Gold Allure
- 2003: Utopia
- 2004: Personal Rush
- 2005: Kane Hekili
- 2006: Man of Purser
- 2007: Haru Sanhiko
- 2008: No race
- 2009: No race
- 2010: Rock Hand Star
- 2011: Kamino Nouveau
- 2012: Rosso Corsa
- 2013: General Grant

== See also ==
- Horse racing in Japan
- List of Japanese flat horse races
