= Hirofumi Shii =

Retired Japanese jockey and trainer

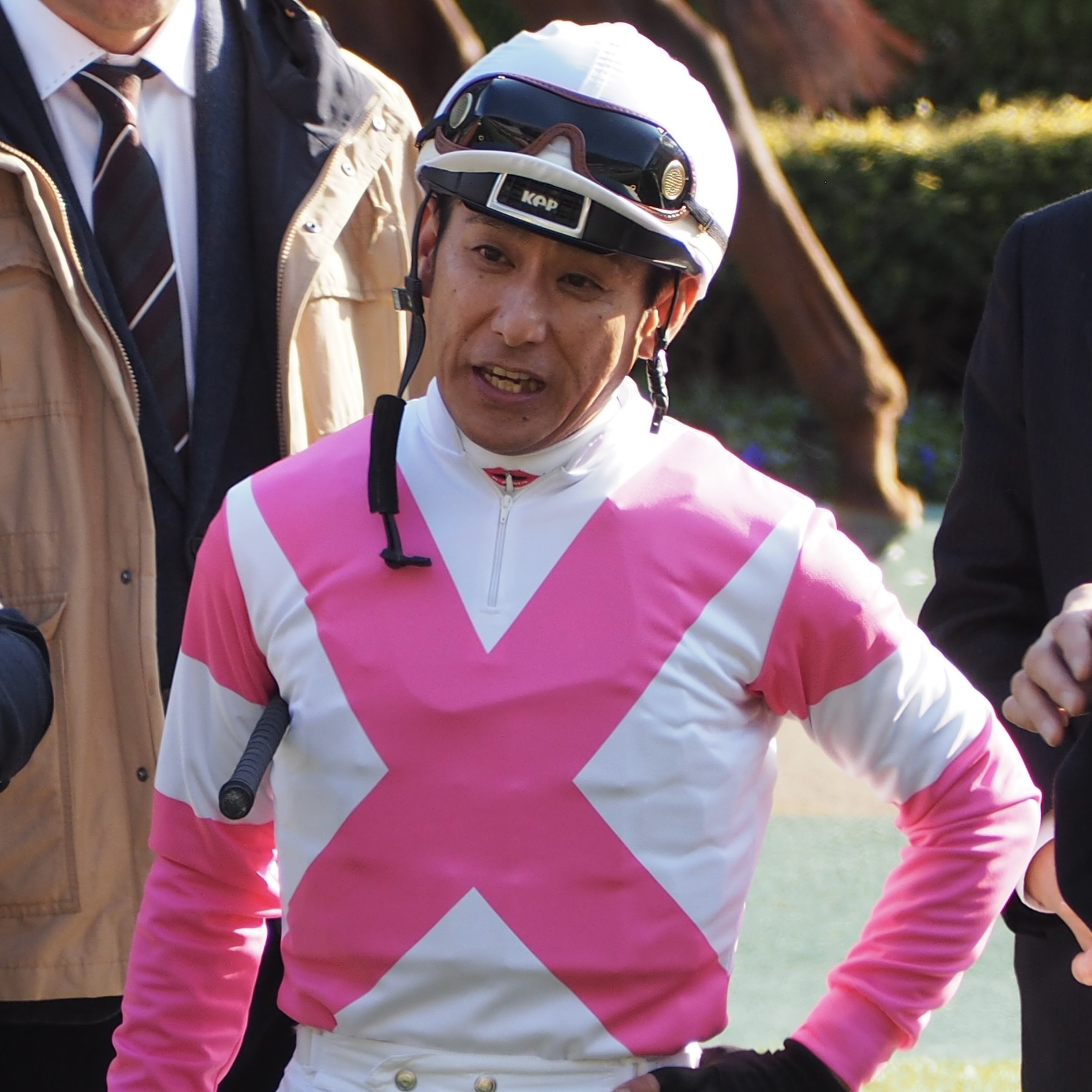
- Shii in 2019 (February Stakes)

Personal information
- Native name: 四位洋文
- Born: November 30, 1972 (age 53) Kagoshima Prefecture, Japan

Horse racing career
- Sport: Horse racing

Significant horses
- Ishino Sunday, Shinko Forest, Dance Partner, Agnes Digital, Yamanin Sucre, Vodka, Asakusa Kings, Deep Sky, Red Desire, Kinshasa no Kiseki

Hirofumi Shii (四位洋文; born November 30, 1972) is a former jockey and current Japanese racehorse trainer affiliated with the Ritto Training Center of the Japan Racing Association (JRA). He is the nephew of former jockey Michinori Shii.

== Career ==
Shii began gaining experience in horseback riding on his third year of elementary school, through riding ponies. Before entering the JRA Racing School, he had already achieved some success at the national level in equestrian competitions, and had been featured in equestrian magazine Jōba Life (乗馬ライフ).

After graduating from junior high school, he entered the JRA Racing School as a member of its seventh class, where he achieved consistently high academic and practical results. Shii became a jockey in 1991 and won his first graded race in 1994, when, riding Golden Jack, he won the Yonsai Himba Tokubetsu, a Grade 2 and a trial race for the first leg of the fillies' classic, the Oka Shō.

In 1996, Shii won his first Grade 1 race along with Ishino Sunday in the Satsuki Shō. In the same year, he won the Queen Elizabeth II Cup, which had been opened to older fillies and mares that year, aboard Dance Partner. In 2001, following the retirement of jockey Hitoshi Matoba Shii took over as the rider of Agnes Digital; together, they won the Mile Championship Nambu Hai, Hong Kong Cup, and the Tennō Shō (Autumn), defeating reigning champion T. M. Opera O. Shii recorded 98 victories that year, making him the leading jockey in western Japan.

Shii continued his association with Agnes Digital into the following seasons, winning the February Stakes in 2002 and the Yasuda Kinen in 2003, setting a record time.

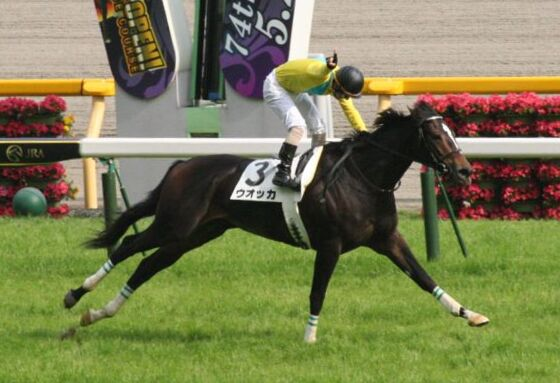
Vodka, winning the 2007 Japanese Derby

Shii became a derby jockey when he won the Japanese Derby in 2007 with Vodka. The victory was particularly notable, as Vodka became only the third filly to win the Japanese Derby, and the first in 64 years. The following year, Shii won the Derby again with Deep Sky. On October 21 of the same year, Shii won the 68th Kikuka-shō aboard Asakusa Kings. With this victory, he became the 17th jockey to have won all three races of the Japanese Triple Crown; He also became the first jockey in the history of Japanese racing, since the establishment of the modern three-year-old Classics, to win both the Japanese Derby and the Kikuka Sho in the same year with different horses.

In 2019, the Japan Racing Association announced that Shii was one of the eight people who had passed the examination for a new trainer's license for the 2020 fiscal year. Shii officially retired on February 29, 2020, and the license was issued effective March 1. A retirement ceremony was held after the final race at Hanshin Racecourse. However, because racing was being conducted without spectators due to the COVID-19 pandemic, attendance was limited to racing officials, jockeys and owners.

As a trainer, Shii would open his stable on March 2021. That same month, Shii had his first winner as a trainer when Summer Beat won an allowance race at Kokura Racecourse. On December 21, 2020, the JRA announced that Shii would begin his career as a trainer at the Ritto Training Center, with his stable officially opening on March 1, 2021.

=== Training career ===
In 2023, Shii would have his first graded race win as a trainer, when Hagino Alegrias won the Nagoya Daishoten (NAR); he went on to win the 27th Sirius Stakes, a Grade 3 handicap race on dirt, earning Shii his first JRA graded stakes win.

== Major wins as a jockey ==
Hong Kong

- Hong Kong Cup - (1) - Agnes Digital (2001)

Japan

- Asahi Hai Futurity Stakes - (1) - Satono Ares (2016)
- February Stakes - (1) - Agnes Digital (2002)
- Hanshin Juvenile Fillies - (2) - Yamanin Sucre (2003), Vodka (2006)
- Japan Dirt Derby - (1) - Hatano Vanqueur (2012)
- Kawasaki Kinen - (1) - Hatano Vanqueur (2013)
- Kikuka-shō - (1) - Asakusa Kings (2007)
- Mile Championship Nambu Hai - (1) - Agnes Digital (2001)
- NHK Mile Cup - (1) - Deep Sky (2008)
- Queen Elizabeth II Cup - (1) - Dance Partner (1996)
- Satsuki Shō - (1) - Ishino Sunday (1996)
- Shūka Sho - (1) - Red Desire (2009)
- Takamatsunomiya Kinen - (2) - Shinko Forest (1998), Kinshasa no Kiseki (2010)
- Tennō Shō (Autumn) - (1) - Agnes Digital (2001)
- Tōkyō Yūshun - (2)- Vodka (2007), Deep Sky (2008)
- Yasuda Kinen - (1) - Agnes Digital (2003)
