= Morioka Racecourse =

Horse racing venue in Morioka, Iwate, Japan

Coordinates: 39.690822°N 141.220067°E

Morioka Racecourse 盛岡競馬場
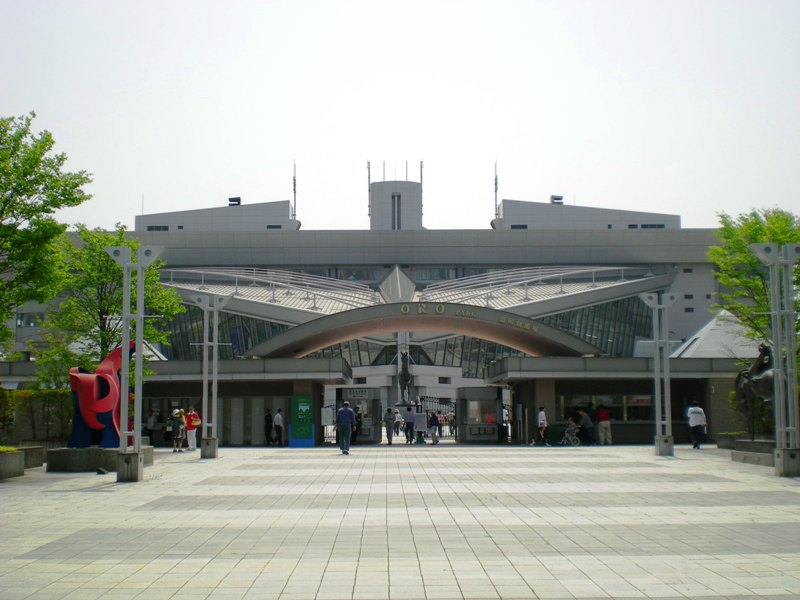
- Entrance to Morioka Racecourse
- Location: Morioka, Iwate, Japan
- Owned by: Iwate Racing Association
- Operated by: Iwate Racing Association
- Date opened: 1932 (rebuilt 1992)
- Race type: Thoroughbred - flat racing
- Course type: Dirt, grass
- Notable races: Mile Championship Nambu Hai (Jpn1)

Morioka Racecourse (盛岡競馬場, Morioka Keiba-jō) is located in Morioka, Iwate, Japan. Originally built in 1932 for horse racing, the racecourse was rebuilt in 1992. It is a dirt and grass left-handed (counter-clockwise) racecourse.

The 2025 racing season began at the course on 3 May 2025.

== Notable races ==
Month	Race	Distance	Age/sex
JPN I
Oct.	Mile Championship Nambu Hai	Dirt 1600m	3yo +
JPN III
Jul.	Mercury Cup	Dirt 2000m	3yo +
M2
Sept.	Seiran Sho	Dirt 1600m	3yo-4yo
