= Deep Bond =

Japanese Thoroughbred racehorse (foaled 2017)

Deep Bond; ディープボンド
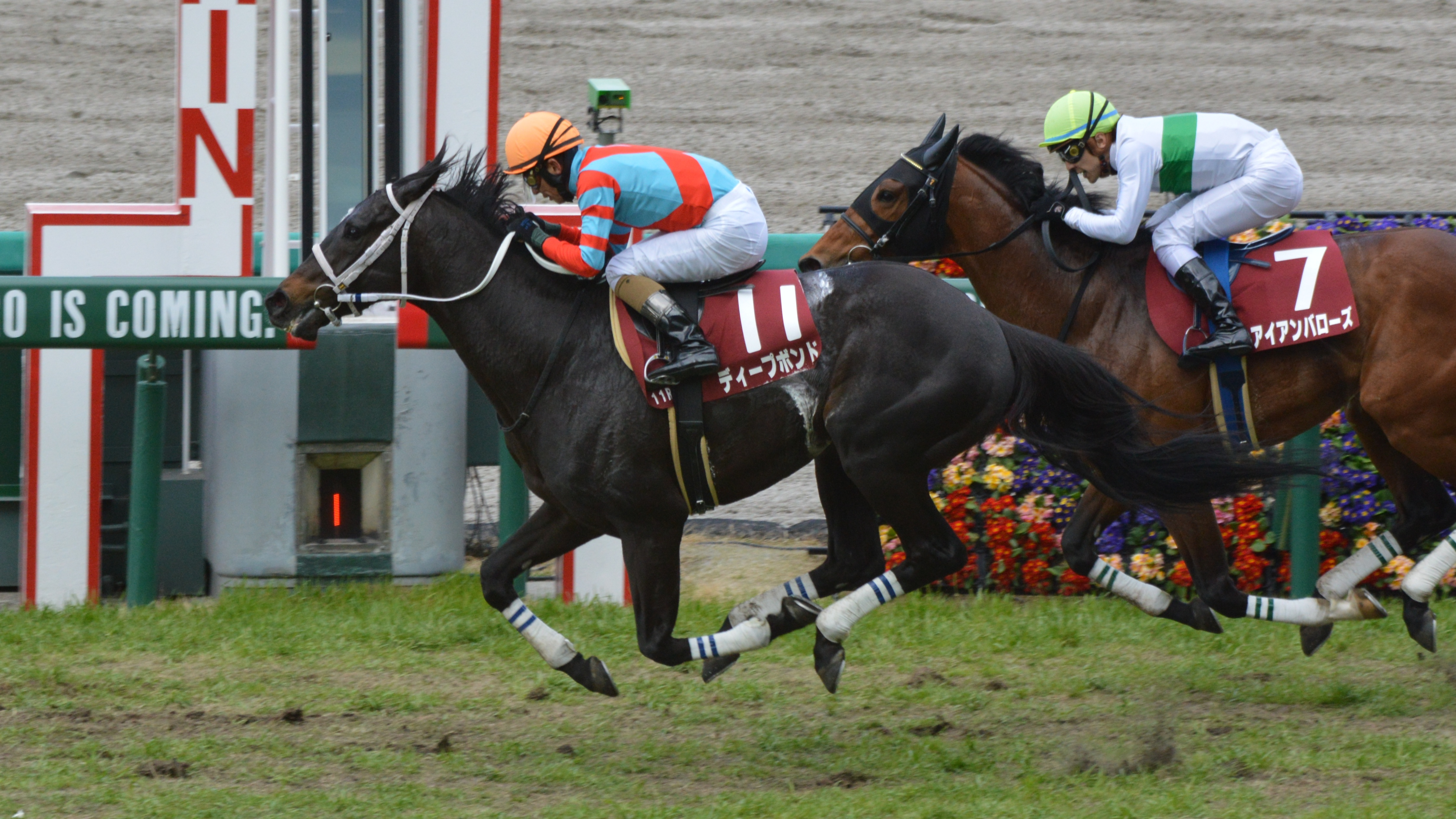
- Deep Bond after winning the 2022 Hanshin Daishoten
- Breed: Thoroughbred
- Sire: Kizuna
- Grandsire: Deep Impact
- Dam: Zephyranthes
- Damsire: King Halo
- Sex: Stallion
- Foaled: 18 February 2017 (age 9)
- Country: Japan
- Colour: Dark bay
- Breeder: Murata Farm
- Owner: Shinji Maeda
- Racing colours
- Trainer: Ryuji Okubo
- Jockey: Ryuji Wada; Yuga Kawada; Hideaki Miyuki
- Record: 31: 5-5-4
- Earnings: ¥767,815,800

Major wins
- Kyoto Shimbun Hai (2020); Hanshin Daishoten (2021, 2022); Prix Foy (2021)

Deep Bond (Japanese: ディープボンド, Dīpu Bondo; foaled 18 February 2017) is a retired Japanese Thoroughbred racehorse. He competed from 2019 to 2024, recording five wins from thirty-one starts, including the Kyoto Shimbun Hai (GII) in 2020, the Hanshin Daishoten (GII) in 2021 and 2022, and the Prix Foy (G2) in France in 2021. He is notable for finishing second in the Tenno Sho (Spring) (GI) for three consecutive years (2021–2023) and for holding the record for the most career prize money earned by a horse without a top-level (GI/G1) victory.

== Background ==
Deep Bond is a dark bay stallion bred in Niikappu, Hokkaido, by Murata Farm. He was sired by Kizuna, a son of Deep Impact, and his dam was Zephyranthes (ゼフィランサス), a mare by King Halo. Zephyranthes is a descendant of the Mogami Hime family, which also produced the dual GI winner Laurel Guerreiro. Deep Bond was purchased for ¥17,820,000 at the 2018 Hokkaido Selection Sale by Shinji Maeda, owner of the North Hills syndicate. He was trained by Ryuji Okubo at the JRA's Ritto Training Center.

He would be nicknamed "Pubo-kun (Japanese: プボくん)" by fans, which is a shortened form of the horse's name.

== Racing career ==
=== 2019: two-year-old season ===
Deep Bond debuted on 13 October 2019 in a maiden race at Kyoto Racecourse, finishing third. He won his second start over 2000 metres at Kyoto on 3 November.

=== 2020: three-year-old season ===
After an unplaced run in an allowance race, Deep Bond finished second in the Azalea Sho and tenth in the Satsuki Shō (GI). On 9 May, he won the Kyoto Shimbun Hai (GII), defeating Man of Spirit in a tight finish to secure his first graded stakes victory and completing a father-son double alongside his sire, Kizuna. He subsequently finished fifth in the Tōkyō Yūshun (Japanese Derby), fifth in the Kobe Shimbun Hai, and fourth in the Kikuka Shō (GI) behind the undefeated Contrail.

=== 2021: four-year-old season ===
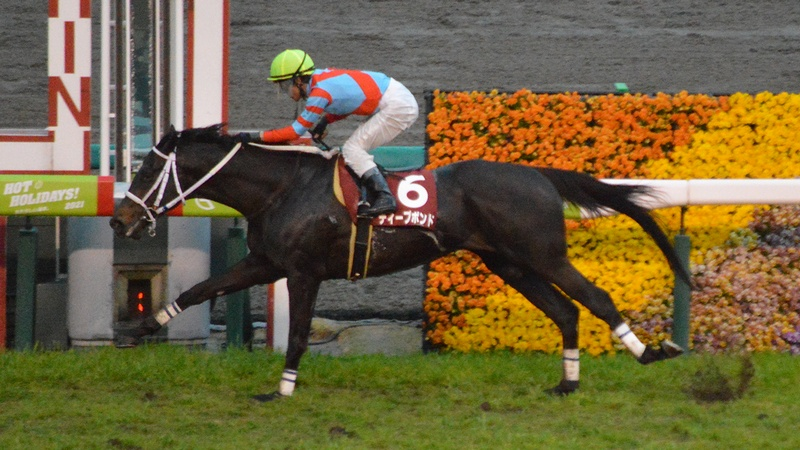
Deep Bond winning the 2021 Hanshin Daishoten

Deep Bond began his season with a fourteenth-place finish in the Nakayama Kimpai (GIII). On 21 March, he won the Hanshin Daishoten (GII) by 0.9 seconds. He was made the favourite for the Tenno Sho (Spring) (GI) on 2 May, where he finished second to World Premiere.

In autumn, Deep Bond travelled to France. On 12 September, he won the Prix Foy (G2) at Longchamp Racecourse, becoming the first Japanese-trained horse to win the race since Orfevre in 2012 and 2013. He finished fourteenth in the Prix de l'Arc de Triomphe (G1) on heavy ground. Returning to Japan, he finished second in the Arima Kinen (GI) on 26 December, narrowly missing out to Efforia.

=== 2022: five-year-old season ===
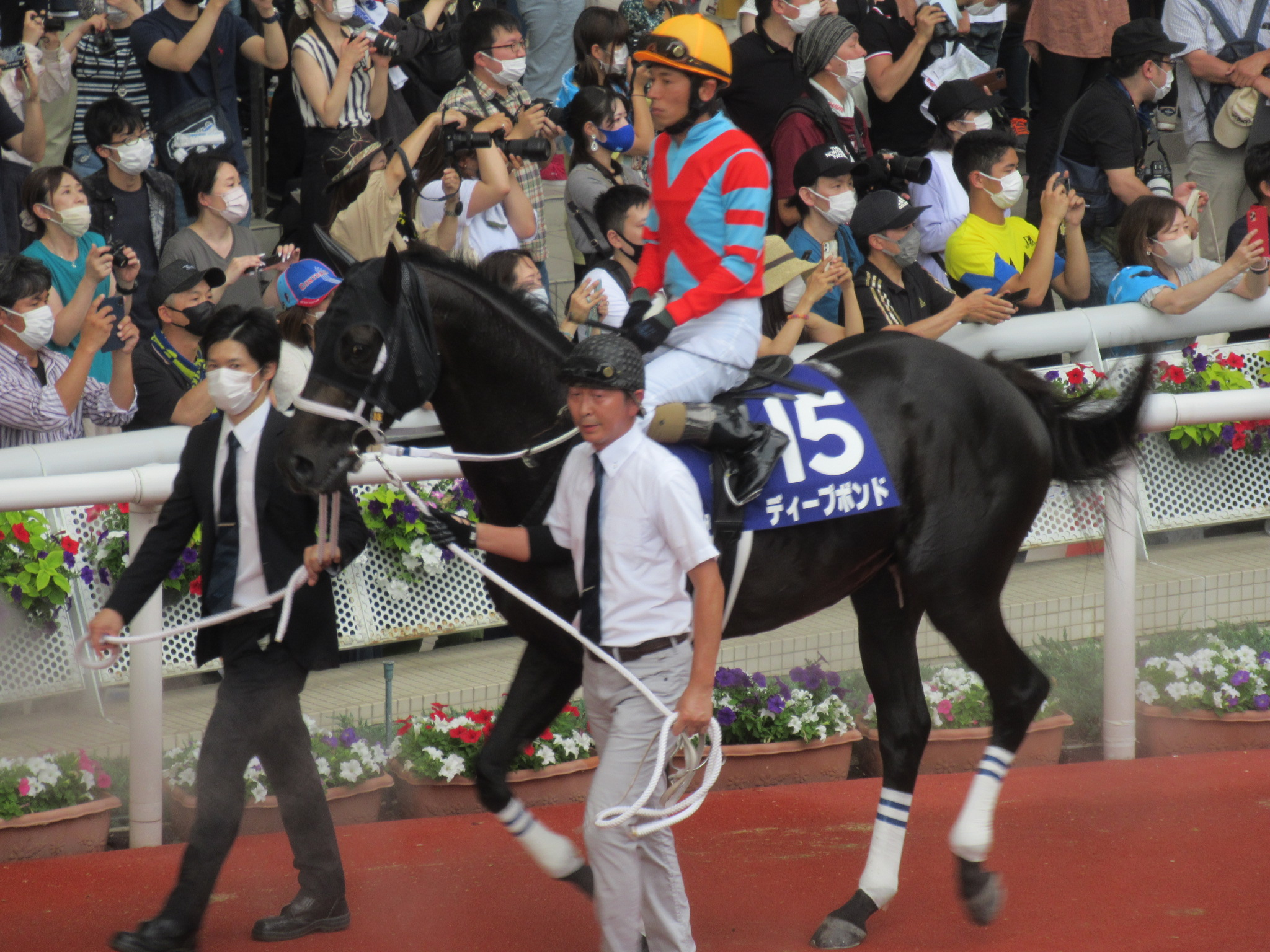
Deep Bond at the 2022 Takarazuka Kinen

Deep Bond won his second consecutive Hanshin Daishoten (GII) on 20 March. He finished second in the Tenno Sho (Spring) for the second year in a row, beaten by Titleholder. After finishing fourth in the Takarazuka Kinen (GI), he travelled to France again but finished eighteenth in the Prix de l'Arc de Triomphe. He ended the season with an eighth-place finish in the Arima Kinen.

=== 2023: six-year-old season ===
Deep Bond attempted to become the first horse since Gold Ship to win three consecutive Hanshin Daishotens but finished fifth behind T O Royal. On 30 April, he finished second in the Tenno Sho (Spring) for a historic third consecutive year, a rare feat in Japanese racing. This result also made him the highest-earning horse in JRA history without a Group I victory, surpassing the record held by Kyoto City and Nice Nature. He later finished fifth in the Takarazuka Kinen, third in the Kyoto Daishoten (GII), tenth in the Japan Cup (GI), and fifteenth in the Arima Kinen.

=== 2024: seven-year-old season ===
Deep Bond finished seventh in the Hanshin Daishoten and third in the Tenno Sho (Spring). On 6 October, he finished second in the Kyoto Daishoten (GII) to Chevalier Rose. He contested his final race in the Arima Kinen on 22 December, finishing thirteenth. He was officially retired on 25 December 2024.

== Statistics ==
The following table details all 31 starts of Deep Bond's racing career. Record current as of 22 December 2024.

Date	Distance (Condition)	Race	Class	Course	Odds (Favourite)	Field	Finish	Time	Jockey	Winning (Losing) Margin	Winner (2nd Place)	Ref
2019 – two-year-old season
Oct 13	Turf 2000 m (Heavy)	2-Y-O Newcomer	Maiden	Kyoto	9.6 (4th)	15	3rd	2:03.5	Ryuji Wada	0.4	Kimuken Dream	
Nov 3	Turf 2000 m (Good)	2-Y-O Maiden	Maiden	Kyoto	3.6 (2nd)	10	1st	2:01.1	Ryuji Wada	–0.5	(Iron Barows)	
2020 – three-year-old season
Jan 5	Turf 2000 m (Good)	Fukujuso Tokubetsu	Allowance	Kyoto	5.1 (4th)	7	6th	2:04.9	Ryuji Wada	1.4	L'Excellence	
Apr 4	Turf 2400 m (Good)	Azalea Sho	Allowance	Hanshin	12.7 (4th)	8	2nd	2:27.5	Ryuji Wada	0.1	Fly Like Bird	
Apr 19	Turf 2000 m (Yielding)	Satsuki Shō	GI	Nakayama	360.9 (18th)	18	10th	2:02.1	Norihiro Yokoyama	1.4	Contrail	
May 9	Turf 2200 m (Good)	Kyoto Shimbun Hai	GII	Kyoto	10.7 (4th)	13	1st	2:11.7	Ryuji Wada	0.0	(Man of Spirit)	
May 31	Turf 2400 m (Good)	Tōkyō Yūshun	GI	Tokyo	61.6 (8th)	18	5th	2:25.0	Ryuji Wada	0.9	Contrail	
Sep 27	Turf 2200 m (Good)	Kobe Shimbun Hai	GII	Chukyo	23.5 (4th)	18	5th	2:13.0	Ryuji Wada	0.5	Contrail	
Oct 25	Turf 3000 m (Good)	Kikuka Shō	GI	Kyoto	51.6 (7th)	18	4th	3:06.2	Ryuji Wada	0.7	Contrail	
2021 – four-year-old season
Jan 5	Turf 2000 m (Good)	Nakayama Kimpai	GIII	Nakayama	4.3 (2nd)	17	14th	2:02.0	Ryuji Wada	1.1	Hishi Iguazu	
Mar 21	Turf 3000 m (Heavy)	Hanshin Daishoten	GII	Hanshin	10.3 (3rd)	13	1st	3:07.3	Ryuji Wada	–0.9	(You Can Smile)	
May 2	Turf 3200 m (Good)	Tenno Sho (Spring)	GI	Hanshin	3.6 (1st)	17	2nd	3:14.8	Ryuji Wada	0.1	World Premiere	
Sep 12	Turf 2400 m (Good)	Prix Foy	G2	Longchamp	12.0 (5th)	6	1st	2:31.82	Cristian Demuro	–0.24	(Broome)	
Oct 3	Turf 2400 m (Heavy)	Prix de l'Arc de Triomphe	G1	Longchamp	18.0 (6th)	14	14th	2:44.83	Mickael Barzalona	7.21	Torquator Tasso	
Dec 26	Turf 2500 m (Good)	Arima Kinen	GI	Nakayama	20.9 (5th)	16	2nd	2:32.1	Ryuji Wada	0.1	Efforia	
2022 – five-year-old season
Mar 20	Turf 3000 m (Good)	Hanshin Daishoten	GII	Hanshin	1.2 (1st)	13	1st	3:05.0	Ryuji Wada	–0.1	(Iron Barows)	
May 1	Turf 3200 m (Yielding)	Tenno Sho (Spring)	GI	Hanshin	2.1 (1st)	18	2nd	3:17.3	Ryuji Wada	1.1	Titleholder	
Jun 26	Turf 2200 m (Good)	Takarazuka Kinen	GI	Hanshin	5.6 (3rd)	17	4th	2:10.3	Ryuji Wada	0.6	Titleholder	
Oct 2	Turf 2400 m (Soft)	Prix de l'Arc de Triomphe	G1	Longchamp	46.0 (14th)	20	18th	2:42.88	Yuga Kawada	7.17	Alpinista	
Dec 25	Turf 2500 m (Good)	Arima Kinen	GI	Nakayama	37.3 (8th)	16	8th	2:33.6	Yuga Kawada	1.2	Equinox	
2023 – six-year-old season
Mar 19	Turf 3000 m (Good)	Hanshin Daishoten	GII	Hanshin	5.1 (3rd)	14	5th	3:06.6	Ryuji Wada	0.5	Justin Palace	
Apr 30	Turf 3200 m (Yielding)	Tenno Sho (Spring)	GI	Kyoto	22.5 (5th)	17	2nd	3:16.5	Ryuji Wada	0.4	Justin Palace	
Jun 25	Turf 2200 m (Good)	Takarazuka Kinen	GI	Hanshin	16.6 (5th)	17	5th	2:11.6	Ryuji Wada	0.4	Equinox	
Oct 9	Turf 2400 m (Heavy)	Kyōto Daishōten	GII	Kyoto	4.0 (1st)	14	3rd	2:25.4	Ryuji Wada	0.1	Pradaria	
Nov 26	Turf 2400 m (Good)	Japan Cup	GI	Tokyo	83.8 (8th)	18	10th	2:23.6	Ryuji Wada	1.8	Equinox	
Dec 24	Turf 2500 m (Good)	Arima Kinen	GI	Nakayama	47.4 (9th)	16	15th	2:32.4	Tom Marquand	1.5	Do Deuce	
2024 – seven-year-old season
Mar 17	Turf 3000 m (Yielding)	Hanshin Daishoten	GII	Hanshin	9.0 (5th)	15	7th	3:08.1	Mirai Iwata	1.3	T O Royal	
Apr 28	Turf 3200 m (Good)	Tenno Sho (Spring)	GI	Kyoto	27.5 (6th)	17	3rd	3:14.6	Hideaki Miyuki	0.4	T O Royal	
Jun 23	Turf 2200 m (Heavy)	Takarazuka Kinen	GI	Kyoto	25.4 (8th)	13	7th	2:12.9	Hideaki Miyuki	0.9	Blow the Horn	
Oct 6	Turf 2400 m (Good)	Kyoto Daishoten	GII	Kyoto	9.9 (4th)	11	2nd	2:22.9	Hideaki Miyuki	0.0	Chevalier Rose	
Dec 22	Turf 2500 m (Good)	Arima Kinen	GI	Nakayama	49.7 (12th)	15	13th	2:33.3	Hideaki Miyuki	1.5	Regaleira	

== Post-retirement ==
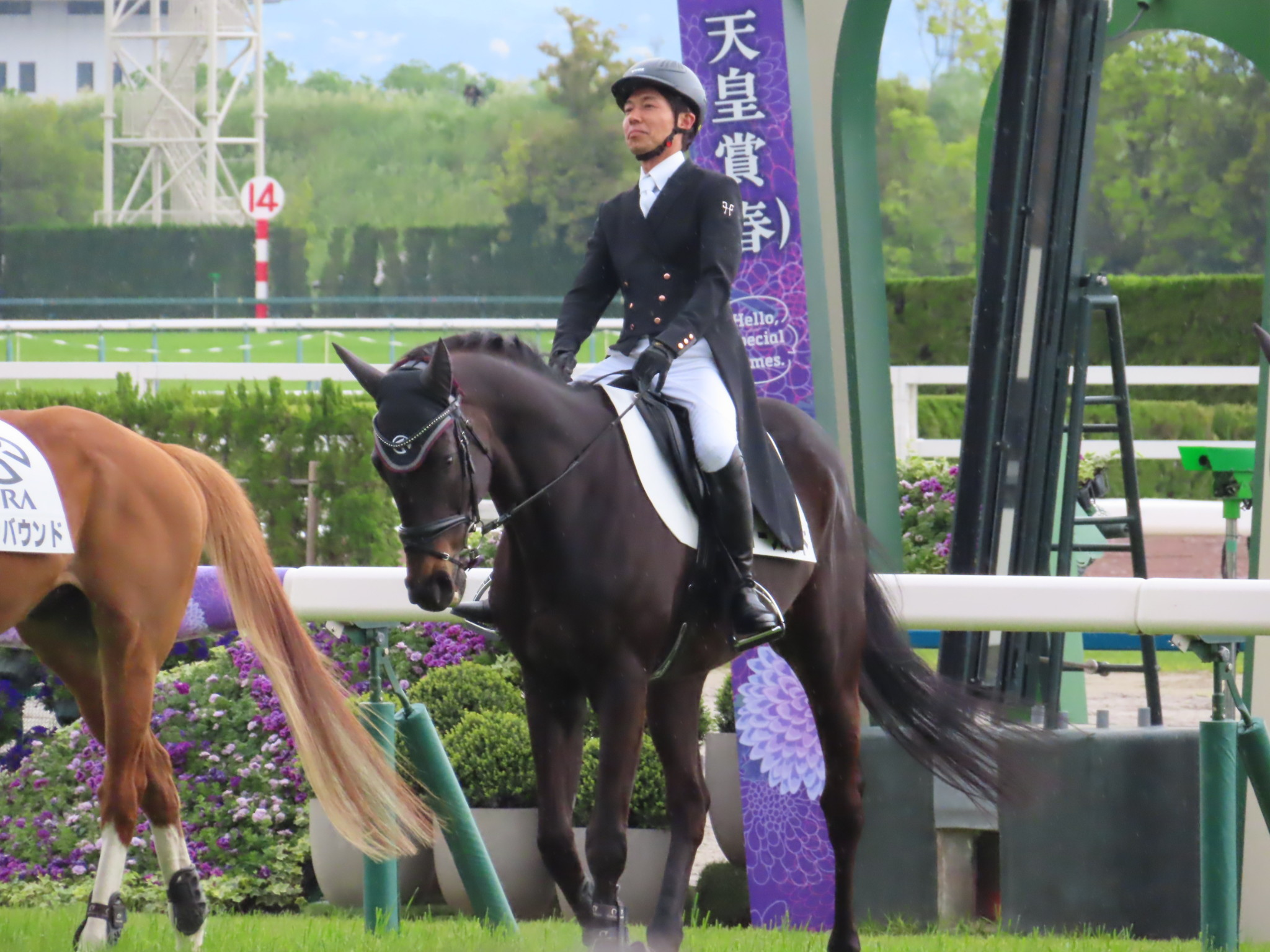
Wada riding Deep Bond as a lead pony in the 2026 Yomiuri Milers Cup

Following his retirement on 25 December 2024, Deep Bond was retrained as a lead pony (ouma) at Kyoto Racecourse. He made his debut as a lead pony on 3 May 2025 and led the field for the Tenno Sho (Spring) the following day. On 26 April 2026, he carried the field for the Yomiuri Milers Cup with his former jockey Ryuji Wada riding him, as his retirement ceremony would be held after the races of that day concluded.

== Pedigree ==
Pedigree of Deep Bond (JPN)
Sire Kizuna (JPN) 2010	Deep Impact (JPN); 2002	Sunday Silence	Halo
Sire Kizuna (JPN) 2010	Deep Impact (JPN); 2002	Sunday Silence	Wishing Well
Sire Kizuna (JPN) 2010	Deep Impact (JPN); 2002	Wind in Her Hair	Alzao
Sire Kizuna (JPN) 2010	Deep Impact (JPN); 2002	Wind in Her Hair	Burghclere
Sire Kizuna (JPN) 2010	Catequil (CAN); 1990	Storm Cat	Storm Bird
Sire Kizuna (JPN) 2010	Catequil (CAN); 1990	Storm Cat	Terlingua
Sire Kizuna (JPN) 2010	Catequil (CAN); 1990	Pacific Princess	Damascus
Sire Kizuna (JPN) 2010	Catequil (CAN); 1990	Pacific Princess	Fiji
Dam Zephyranthes (JPN) 2008	King Halo (JPN); 1995	Dancing Brave	Lyphard
Dam Zephyranthes (JPN) 2008	King Halo (JPN); 1995	Dancing Brave	Navajo Princess
Dam Zephyranthes (JPN) 2008	King Halo (JPN); 1995	Goodbye Halo	Halo
Dam Zephyranthes (JPN) 2008	King Halo (JPN); 1995	Goodbye Halo	Pound Foolish
Dam Zephyranthes (JPN) 2008	Mogami Hime (JPN); 1992	Cacoethes	Alydar
Dam Zephyranthes (JPN) 2008	Mogami Hime (JPN); 1992	Cacoethes	Careless Notion
Dam Zephyranthes (JPN) 2008	Mogami Hime (JPN); 1992	Mogami Point	Maruzensky
Dam Zephyranthes (JPN) 2008	Mogami Hime (JPN); 1992	Mogami Point	Point Maker

- Deep Bond is inbred 4 × 4 to Halo and 5 × 4 to Lyphard.
- His sire Kizuna won the 2013 Tōkyō Yūshun (Japanese Derby).
- His dam Zephyranthes is a half-sister to the dam of Laurel Guerreiro, winner of the 2009 Takamatsunomiya Kinen and Sprinters Stakes.

== See also ==
- Thoroughbred racing in Japan
- Tenno Sho
