= Leontes (horse) =

Japanese-bred Thoroughbred racehorse

Leontes; リオンディーズ
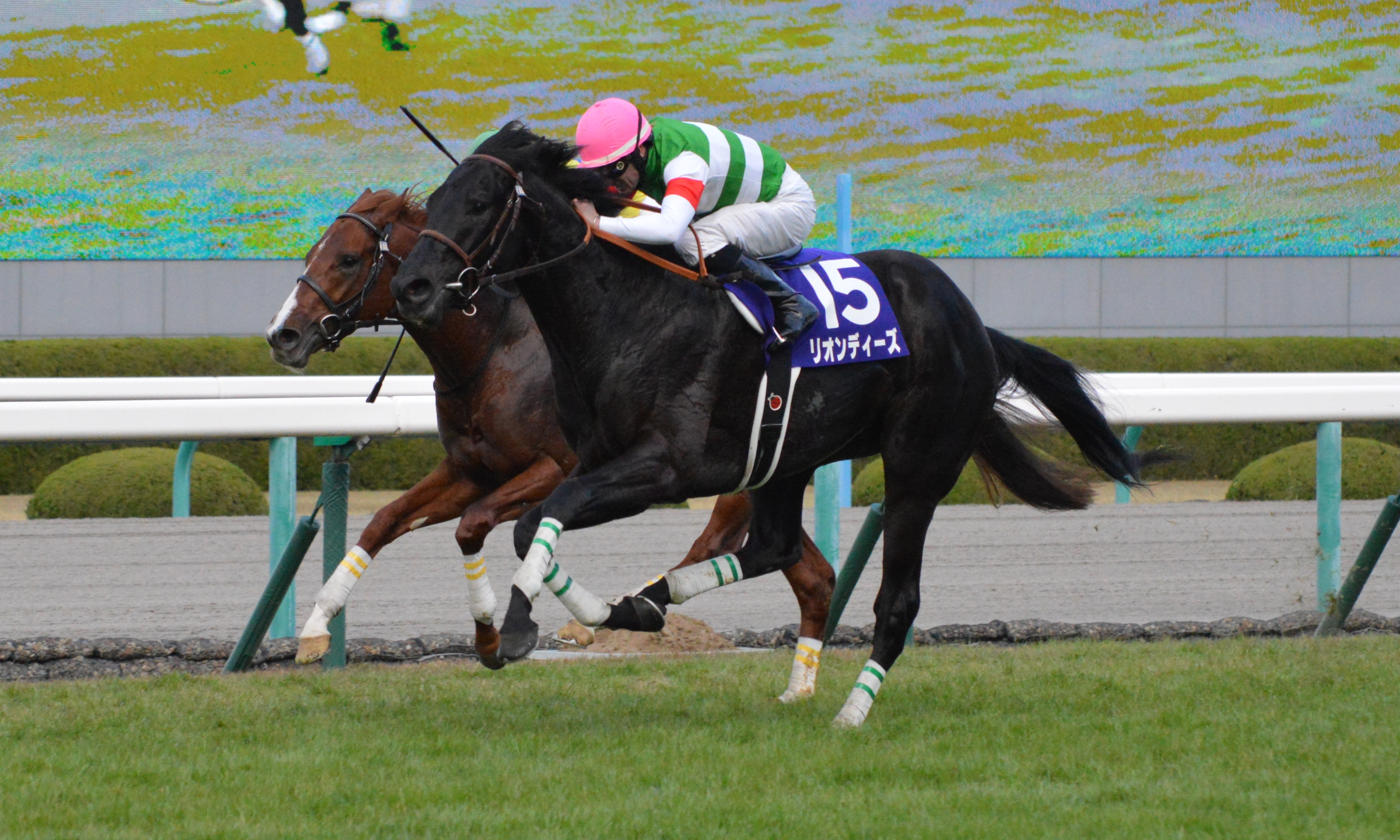
- Leontes wins the Asahi Hai Futurity
- Sire: King Kamehameha
- Grandsire: Kingmambo
- Dam: Cesario
- Damsire: Special Week
- Sex: Stallion
- Foaled: 29 January 2013
- Country: Japan
- Colour: Dark Bay
- Breeder: Northern Farm
- Owner: U Carrot Farm
- Racing colours
- Trainer: Katsuhiko Sumii
- Jockey: Mirco Demuro
- Record: 5: 2-1-0
- Earnings: ¥130,406,000

Major wins
- Asahi Hai Futurity Stakes (2015)

Awards
- JRA Award for Best Two-Year-Old Colt (2015)

Leontes (Japanese: リオンディーズ, foaled 29 January 2013) is a Japanese Thoroughbred racehorse and sire. He was rated the best two-year-old in Japan in 2015 after winning a minor race on his debut and then taking the Grade 1 Asahi Hai Futurity Stakes on his second and final start of the year. The following spring, he finished second in the Yayoi Sho, fourth in the Satsuki Sho and fifth in the Tokyo Yushun before his track career was ended by an injury.

== Background ==
Leontes is a dark bay horse, standing 1.67 metres, with no white markings bred in Japan by Northern Farm. During his racing career he was owned by U Carrot Farm and trained by Katsuhiko Sumii. He was ridden in most of his races by the Italian-born jockey Mirco Demuro.

His sire, King Kamehameha, was one of the best Japanese colts of his generation, beating a field including Heart's Cry and Daiwa Major in the 2004 Japanese Derby. His other winners as a breeding stallion include Lord Kanaloa, Rose Kingdom, Rey de Oro, Apapane and Duramente. Leontes' dam Cesario, a top-class racemare, won the Yushun Himba and the American Oaks and went on to produce the Japan Cup winner Epiphaneia and Saturnalia. Being a fourth-generation descendant of the Epsom Oaks winner Pia, Cesario was related to other major winners, including Chief Singer and Pleasantly Perfect.

== Racing career ==
=== 2015: two-year-old season ===
Leontes did not appear on the track until 22 November when he contested an event for previously unraced juveniles over 2000 metres at Kyoto Racecourse and won by a length from Peace Mind. For his next race the colt was stepped up sharply in class for the Grade 1 Asahi Hai Futurity Stakes over 1600 metres at Hanshin Racecourse on 15 December and started the 4.9/1 second favourite behind the Daily Hai Nisai Stakes winner Air Spinel. Leontes raced at the rear of the field and was still last of the sixteen runners as the field exited the final turn. He then produced a strong, sustained run on the outside, overtook Air Spinel in the last 100 metres and won by three quarters of a length. Mirco Demuro commented "I had been told that this colt was powerful and he certainly showed that when I rode him in training on Wednesday—he was pretty keen but smart and an honest colt. It was his first time over a mile but he responded and really stretched well on the outside. He's got a lot to look forward to in his three-year-old season."

In the JRA Awards for 2015 Leontes topped the poll for the JRA Award for Best Two-Year-Old Colt taking 289 of the 291 votes.

=== 2016: three-year-old season ===
On his first run of 2016 Leontes started 0.9/1 favourite for the Grade 2 Yayoi Sho (a major trial race for the Satsuki Shō) over 2000 metres at Nakayama Racecourse. He took the lead entering the straight and broke clear of his rivals but was caught in the final strides and beaten a neck by Makahiki. In the Satsuki Sho over the same course and distance on 17 April Leontes started second favourite behind Satono Diamond. As in the Yayoi Sho he took the lead at the start of the straight but was outrun in the closing stages, coming home fourth of the eighteen runners behind Dee Majesty, Makahiki and Satono Diamond. He was demoted to fifth place for causing interference to Air Spinel in the straight. On 29 May Leontes started the 4.5/1 fourth choice in the betting for the Tokyo Yushun over 2400 metres at Tokyo Racecourse. In a change of tactic he was restrained towards the rear before producing a strong late run but was unable to reach the leaders and finished fifth behind Makahiki.

When being prepared for an autumn campaign Leontes suffered a tendon injury to his left foreleg which ended both his season and shortly thereafter his racing career. He was retired from racing at the end of the year.

== Racing form ==
Leontes won two races out of five starts. This data is available based on JBIS and netkeiba.

Date	Track	Race	Grade	Distance (Condition)	Entry	HN	Odds (Favored)	Finish	Time	Margins	Jockey	Winner (Runner-up)
2015 – two-year-old season
Nov 22	Kyoto	2yo Newcomer		2,000 m (Firm)	15	15	2.2 (1)	1st	2:02.2	–0.2	Yasunari Iwata	(Peace Mind)
Dec 20	Hanshin	Asahi Hai Futurity Stakes	1	1,600 m (Firm)	16	15	5.9 (2)	1st	1:34.4	–0.1	Mirco Demuro	(Air Spinel)
2016 – three-year-old season
Mar 6	Nakayama	Yayoi Sho	2	2,000 m (Firm)	12	10	1.9 (1)	2nd	1:59.9	0.0	Mirco Demuro	Makahiki
Apr 17	Nakayama	Satsuki Sho	1	2,000 m (Firm)	18	16	2.8 (2)	*5th	1:58.4	0.0	Mirco Demuro	Dee Majesty
May 29	Tokyo	Tokyo Yushun	1	2,400 m (Firm)	18	12	5.5 (4)	5th	2:24.5	0.5	Mirco Demuro	Makahiki

Legend:
Turf

- Leontes demoted from 4th to 5th in Satsuki Sho due to interference with Air Spinel in the straight.

== Stud career ==
Leontes began his stud career in 2017 at the Breeders Stallion Station in Hokkaido.

=== Notable progeny ===
The data below is based on JBIS Stallion Reports.

c = colt, f = filly, g = gelding
bold = grade 1 stakes

Foaled	Name	Sex	Major Wins
2018	Another Lyric	f	Fukushima Himba Stakes
2018	Ripresa	c	Hyōgo Championship
2018	T O Royal	c	Diamond Stakes (twice), Hanshin Daishōten, **Tennō Shō (Spring)**
2019	Industria	c	Lord Derby Challenge Trophy
2019	Justin Rock	g	Kyoto Nisai Stakes
2019	Sunrise Hawk	g	Summer Champion, Hyogo Gold Trophy, Kakitsubata Kinen
2021	Buena Onda	c	Kyoto Kimpai
2021	Lord Couronne	c	Procyon Stakes, Heian Stakes, Miyako Stakes
2022	Museum Mile	c	**Satsuki Shō**, St Lite Kinen, **Arima Kinen**

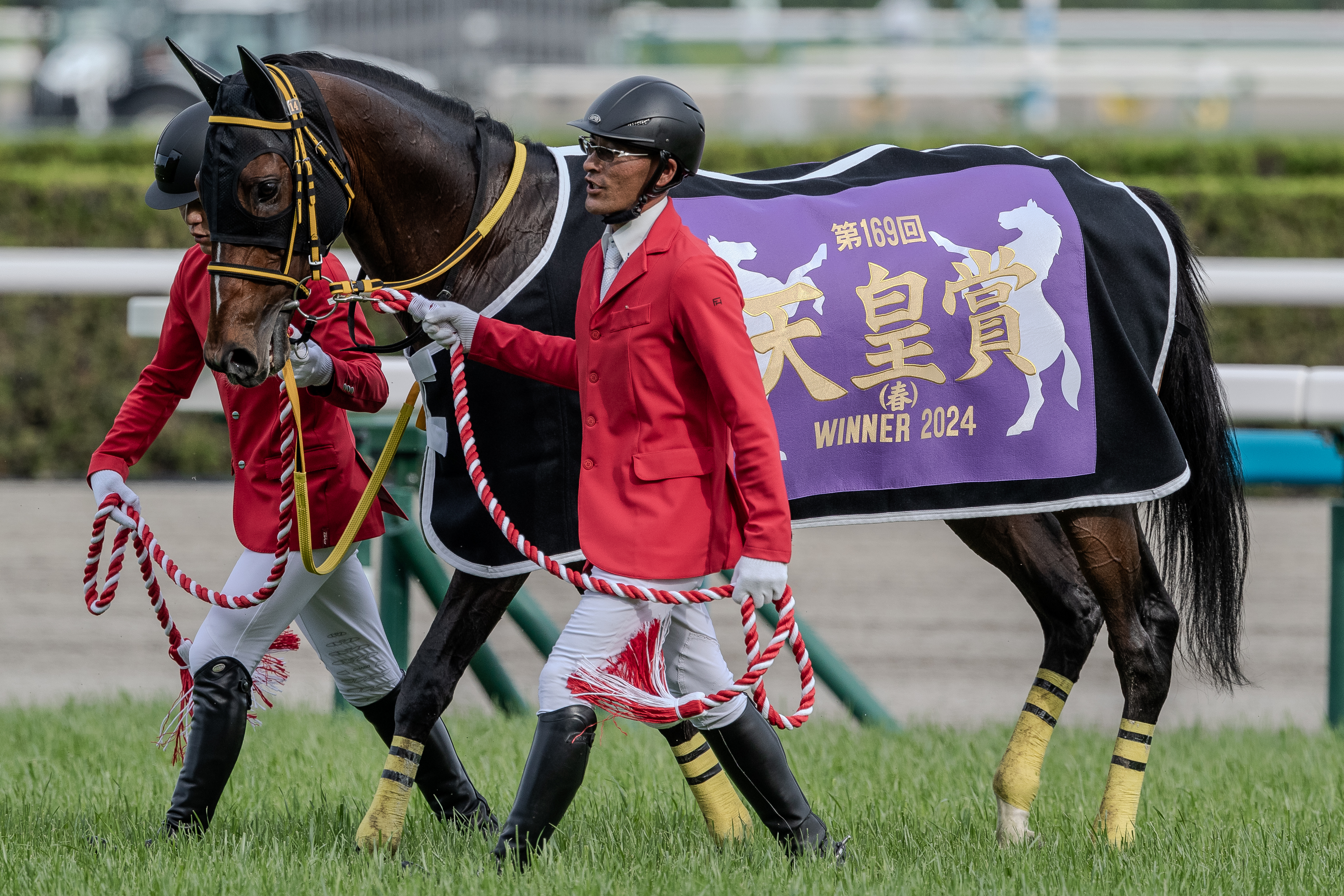
T O Royal

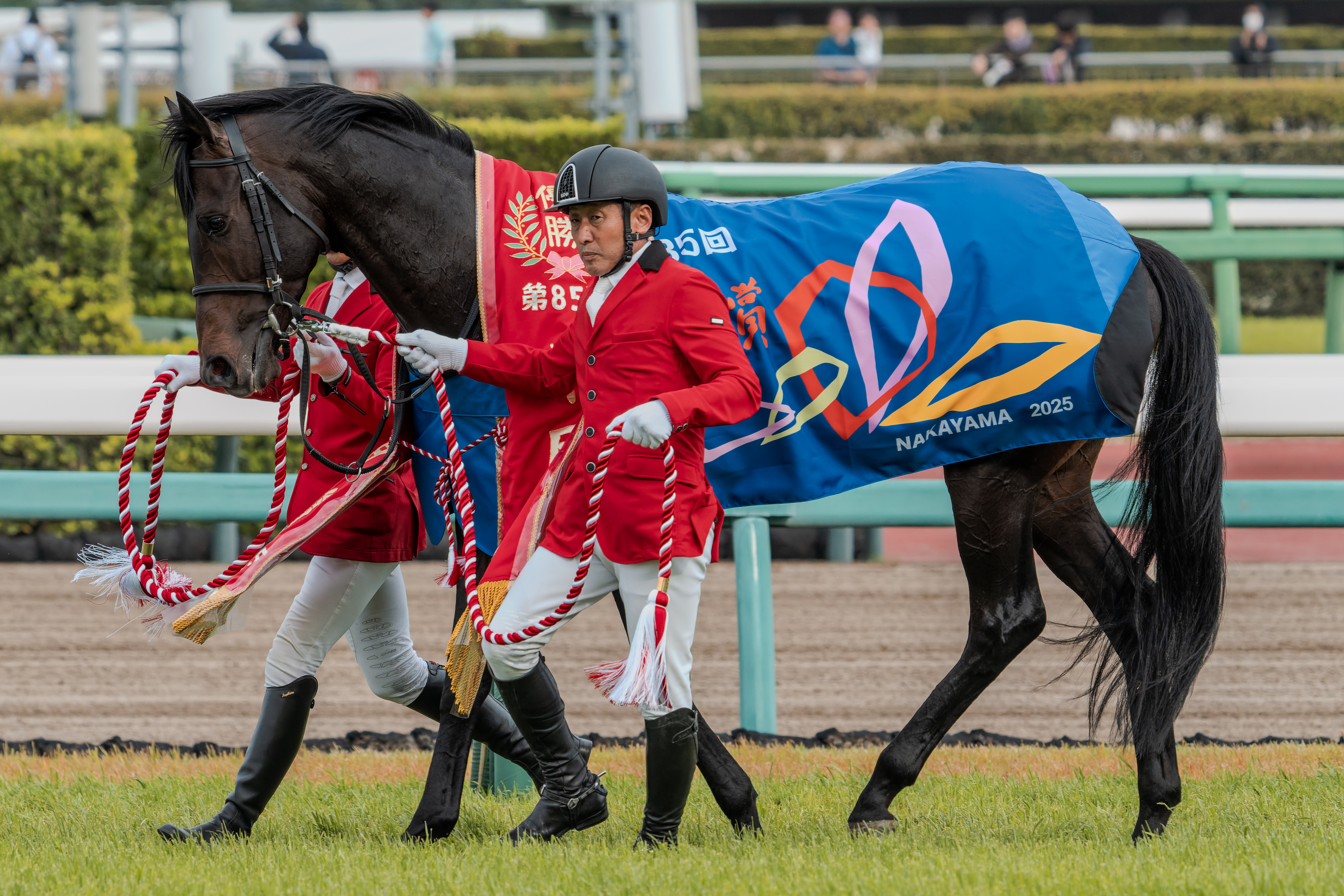
Museum Mile

== Pedigree ==
Pedigree of Leontes (JPN), dark bay horse, 20143
Sire King Kamehameha (JPN) 2001	Kingmambo (USA); 1990	Mr. Prospector	Raise a Native
Sire King Kamehameha (JPN) 2001	Kingmambo (USA); 1990	Mr. Prospector	Gold Digger
Sire King Kamehameha (JPN) 2001	Kingmambo (USA); 1990	Miesque	Nureyev
Sire King Kamehameha (JPN) 2001	Kingmambo (USA); 1990	Miesque	Pasadoble
Sire King Kamehameha (JPN) 2001	Manfath (IRE); 1991	Last Tycoon	Try My Best (USA)
Sire King Kamehameha (JPN) 2001	Manfath (IRE); 1991	Last Tycoon	Mill Princess
Sire King Kamehameha (JPN) 2001	Manfath (IRE); 1991	Pilot Bird (GB)	Blakeney
Sire King Kamehameha (JPN) 2001	Manfath (IRE); 1991	Pilot Bird (GB)	The Dancer (FR)
Dam Cesario (JPN) 2002	Special Week; 1995	Sunday Silence (USA)	Halo
Dam Cesario (JPN) 2002	Special Week; 1995	Sunday Silence (USA)	Wishing Well
Dam Cesario (JPN) 2002	Special Week; 1995	Campaign Girl	Maruzensky
Dam Cesario (JPN) 2002	Special Week; 1995	Campaign Girl	Lady Shiraoki
Dam Cesario (JPN) 2002	Kirov Premiere (GB); 1990	Sadler's Wells (USA)	Northern Dancer (CAN)
Dam Cesario (JPN) 2002	Kirov Premiere (GB); 1990	Sadler's Wells (USA)	Fairy Bridge
Dam Cesario (JPN) 2002	Kirov Premiere (GB); 1990	Querida (IRE)	Habitat (USA)
Dam Cesario (JPN) 2002	Kirov Premiere (GB); 1990	Querida (IRE)	Principia (FR) (family: 16-a)
