= T O Royal =

Japanese racehorse (foaled 2018)

T O Royal; テーオーロイヤル
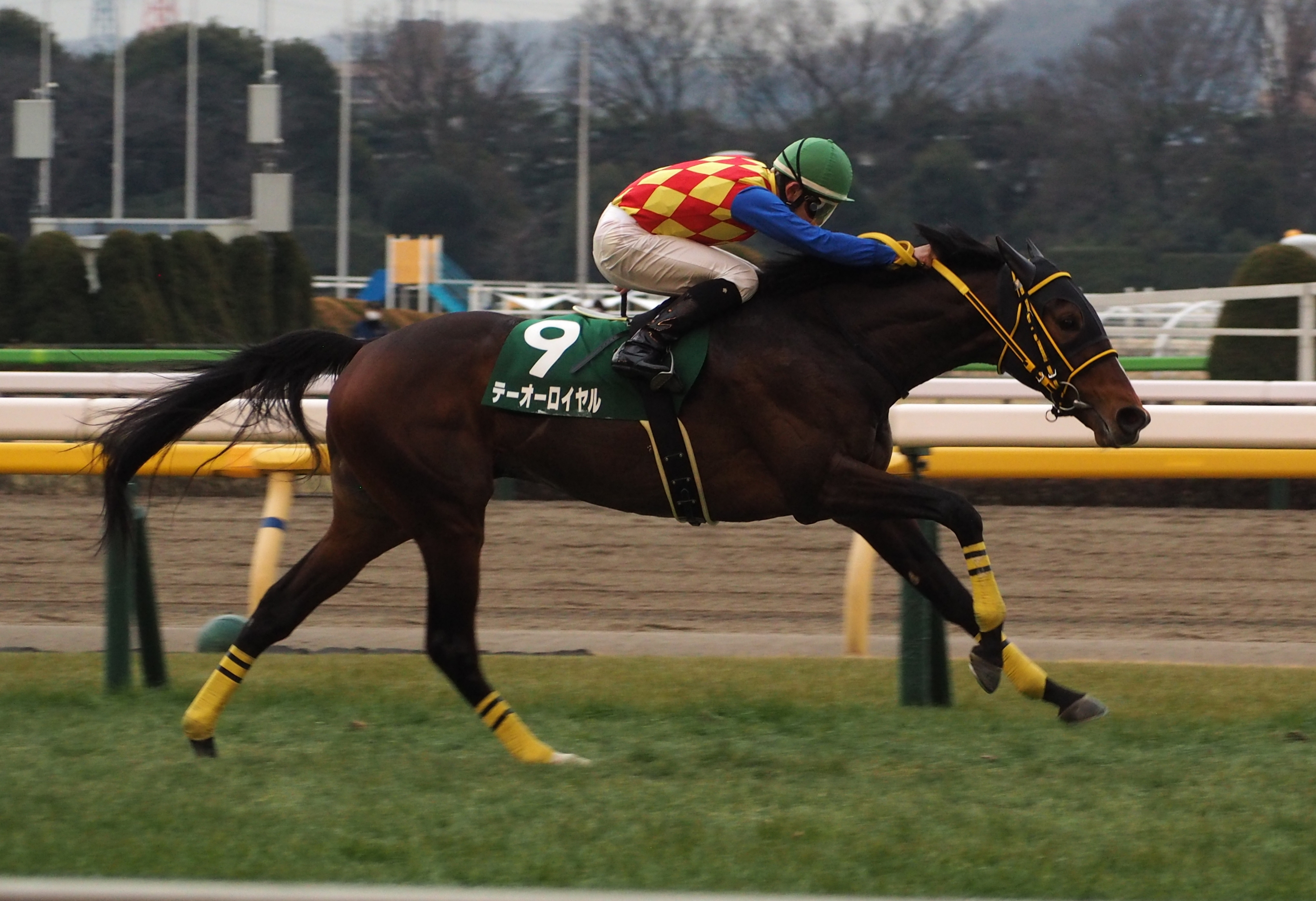
- T O Royal at the 2022 Diamond Stakes
- Sire: Leontes
- Grandsire: King Kamehameha
- Dam: Meisho Ohi
- Damsire: Manhattan Cafe
- Sex: Stallion
- Foaled: 6 March 2018 (age 8); Urakawa, Hokkaido
- Country: Japan
- Color: Bay
- Breeder: Mishima Stud
- Owner: Tomoya Ozasa
- Racing colors
- Trainer: Inao Okada
- Jockey: Yuji Hishida
- Record: 18: 8-1-2
- Earnings: 518,266,000 JPY

Major wins
- Diamond Stakes (2022, 2024); Hanshin Daishoten (2024); Tenno Sho (Spring) (2024)
- Last updated on August 6, 2026

T O Royal (Japanese: テーオーロイヤル, Tēō roiyaru; foaled 6 March 2018) is a retired Japanese racehorse who currently stands as a breeding stallion. He is best known as one of the best stayers of the early 2020s, as all of his graded stakes wins came in races of 3000 metres or longer. He won the Diamond Stakes on two occasions (2022 and 2024), the Hanshin Daishoten in 2024, and his greatest accolade came in the 2024 Tenno Sho (Spring).

== Background ==
T O Royal was foaled out of Meisho Ohi, a mare who won three of her 17 starts in regional racing. Meisho Ohi was herself sired by Manhattan Cafe, a prominent long-distance runner of the early 2000s who won the 2001 Kikuka Sho and the 2002 Tenno Sho (Spring). Meanwhile, his sire, Leontes, won the 2014 Asahi Hai Futurity Stakes and was a son of King Kamehameha and Cesario, two of the leading Japanese horses of the early 2000s.

He was owned by Tomoya Ozasa, who frequently used the prefix T O as his stable name, as with T O Keynes, the 2021 Champions Cup winner, and T O Elvis, the 2026 Churchill Downs Stakes winner. This horse's name combines that prefix with a word befitting a king – Royal.

== Racing career ==
=== 2020: two-year-old season ===
The horse made his debut in December at Hanshin Racecourse, where he finished in third place, two and three-quarter lengths behind the winner, Elizabeth Tower.

=== 2021: three-year-old season ===
He ran for the second time in January in a maiden race at Chukyo Racecourse. He raced in the middle of the pack throughout and finished ninth. Two months later, he contested another maiden race at Hanshin with a new jockey, Yuji Hishida. He fared better this time, finishing fourth, six and a half lengths behind the winner, Prognosis. In his fourth race in April, Hishida got the horse away to a good start, settled him in the middle of the pack, and tracked the field at a good rhythm. At the fourth corner, Hishida drove T O Royal along the inside entering the final straight and broke away with the fastest closing sectional to claim his first career win. Hishida spoke with a beaming face after the win, "The horse had been getting better little by little in training, and I was really hoping to win with this horse, so I'm glad." This win qualified him for the Aoba Sho, a trial race for the Tokyo Yushun. In that race, he was held up at the back for most of the way before sprinting at the finish; he came home fourth and failed to qualify. Hishida sensed something about the horse and noted, "He's a horse with stamina. He used his legs well at the end, so I'm looking forward to seeing what he does in the future."

He rested over the summer break and returned in an allowance race in October. Starting as the favourite, he raced from the middle of the pack and won by three-quarters of a length over Satsuki Happiness. Three weeks later, he contested the Hyogo Tokubetsu at Hanshin. Hishida switched tactics for this race, sending T O Royal to the front to lead wire-to-wire and win by three-quarters of a length over the favourite, Machaon d'Or. He finished the season on a high note with a third straight win in the Amagasaki Tokubetsu, where he sat mid-pack and burst forward at the finish to win by two and a half lengths over Nihonpiro Scuro. This was his fourth career win, promoting him to open class for the following season.

=== 2022: four-year-old season ===
T O Royal started the year with a bold move, contesting his first ever graded stakes race, the Diamond Stakes, a 3400-metre G3 race held at Tokyo Racecourse. On the day, he raced in a good position in fourth, took the lead entering the straight, and won by two and a half lengths over Run for the Roses, the 11th favourite, who closed from the outside. This was his fourth consecutive win and his first graded stakes victory. The winning streak gave the whole team the confidence to enter him in his first G1 race, the Tenno Sho (Spring), which he would contest at peak fitness and in his best form, according to Okada's assistant trainer, Kurihara. When the race began, he tracked the leader, Titleholder, closely but was left behind halfway down the straight, weakened towards the finish, was passed by Deep Bond, and came home third. Hishida reflected on the race, saying it was a hard lesson for both him and the horse and that he expected them to grow from it.

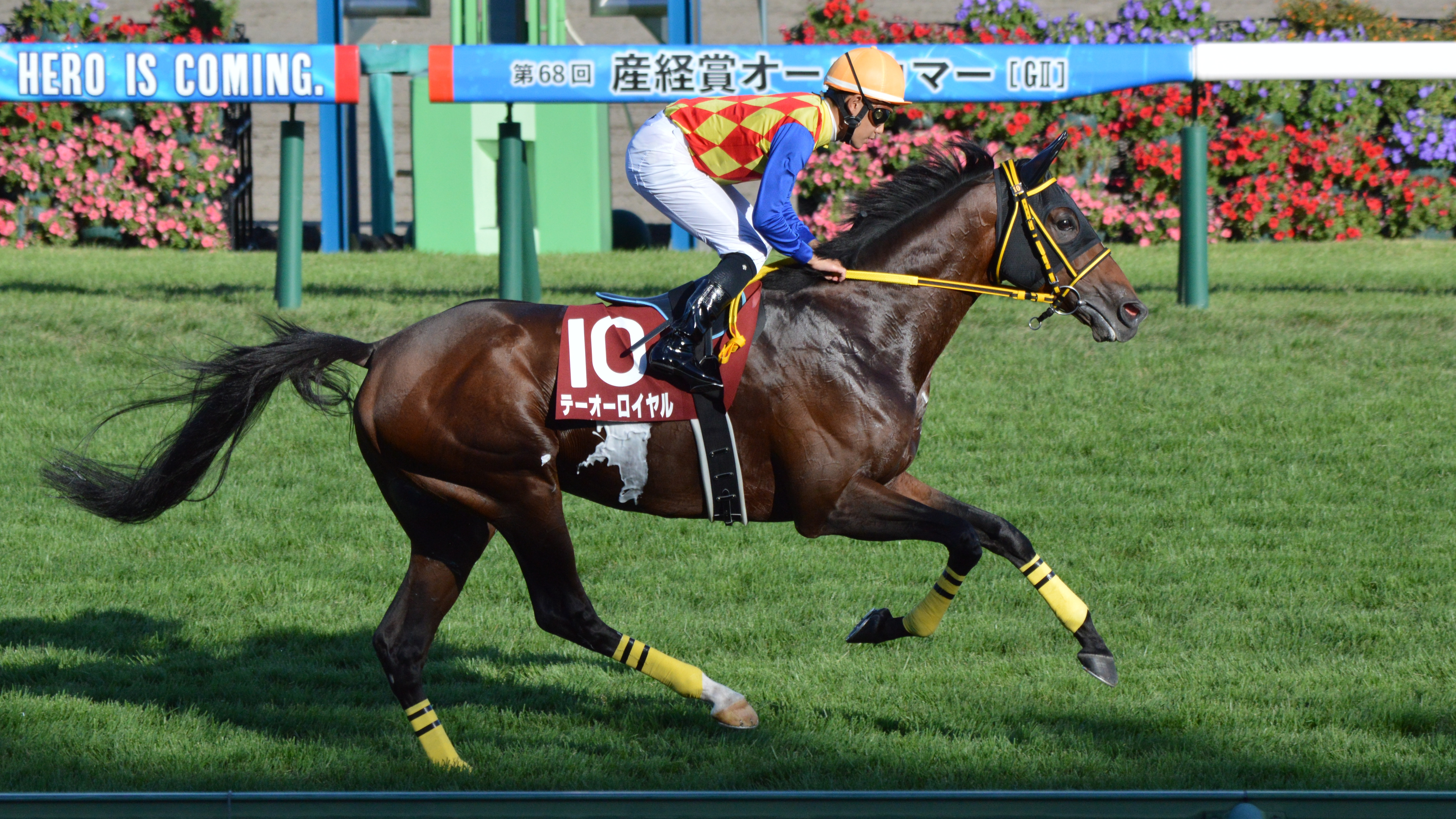
T O Royal at the 2022 Sankei Sho All Comers.

He was rested for four months before racing again in the Sankei Sho All Comers in September. T O Royal failed to capitalise on a good position in the leading group and faded at the finish, coming home fifth. In the Copa Republica Argentina in November, he collided with the front-running King of Dragon, who hit the inside rail and bounced towards him. The incident hampered his final acceleration, though he still managed to finish sixth. He ended the season with a poor run in the Japan Cup, dropping back in the final 400 metres to finish 14th, his first ever double-digit finish.

=== 2023: five-year-old season ===
It was proposed that T O Royal would travel to Saudi Arabia to contest the Red Sea Turf Handicap. The plan was scrapped immediately after a pelvic fracture on his right hind side was discovered, an injury that sidelined him for more than six months. He only returned to racing in November in the Copa Republica Argentina, where he finished a disappointing tenth while carrying a heavy weight in his first race back from the injury. There was a silver lining at the end of the season: ridden by Suguru Hamanaka in the Stayers Stakes, T O Royal tracked in sixth or seventh before unleashing the fastest closing speed of the field to finish second, two and a half lengths behind the winner, Iron Barows. Okada stated after the race, "The horse had improved after his first race in a while. If he was leading like that in a slow-paced race, the horses behind him should have chased him more. It's a shame because he didn't lose due to a lack of ability. We plan to register him for the Arima Kinen next." That Arima Kinen plan never came to fruition, as he was diagnosed with an injury to his right shoulder muscle, leading Okada to pivot his preparation towards the following year's campaign.

=== 2024: six-year-old season ===
This season, Yuji Hishida returned as his jockey after recovering from injury, and they began the year with a run in the Diamond Stakes. He won by a neck in a fierce battle with the favourite, Saliera, who pressed him throughout the straight, giving him a second victory in the race after his 2022 success. Hishida commented after the race, "I'm so happy to have returned from injury and to have been given the opportunity to ride and win like this." This win, together with his second place in the previous year's Stayers Stakes, gave Okada confidence in his genuine staying ability. To test that ability once more before the Tenno Sho (Spring), T O Royal contested the Hanshin Daishoten in March. When the race began, T O Royal raced in a good position and pulled away early in the final straight, giving the chasing pack no chance to catch up and winning by a dominant five lengths over the runner-up, Warp Speed. Hishida briefly commented on the deteriorating track condition caused by earlier rain, but was glad that he and the horse had secured a good position from the start and maintained their composure to the finish line.

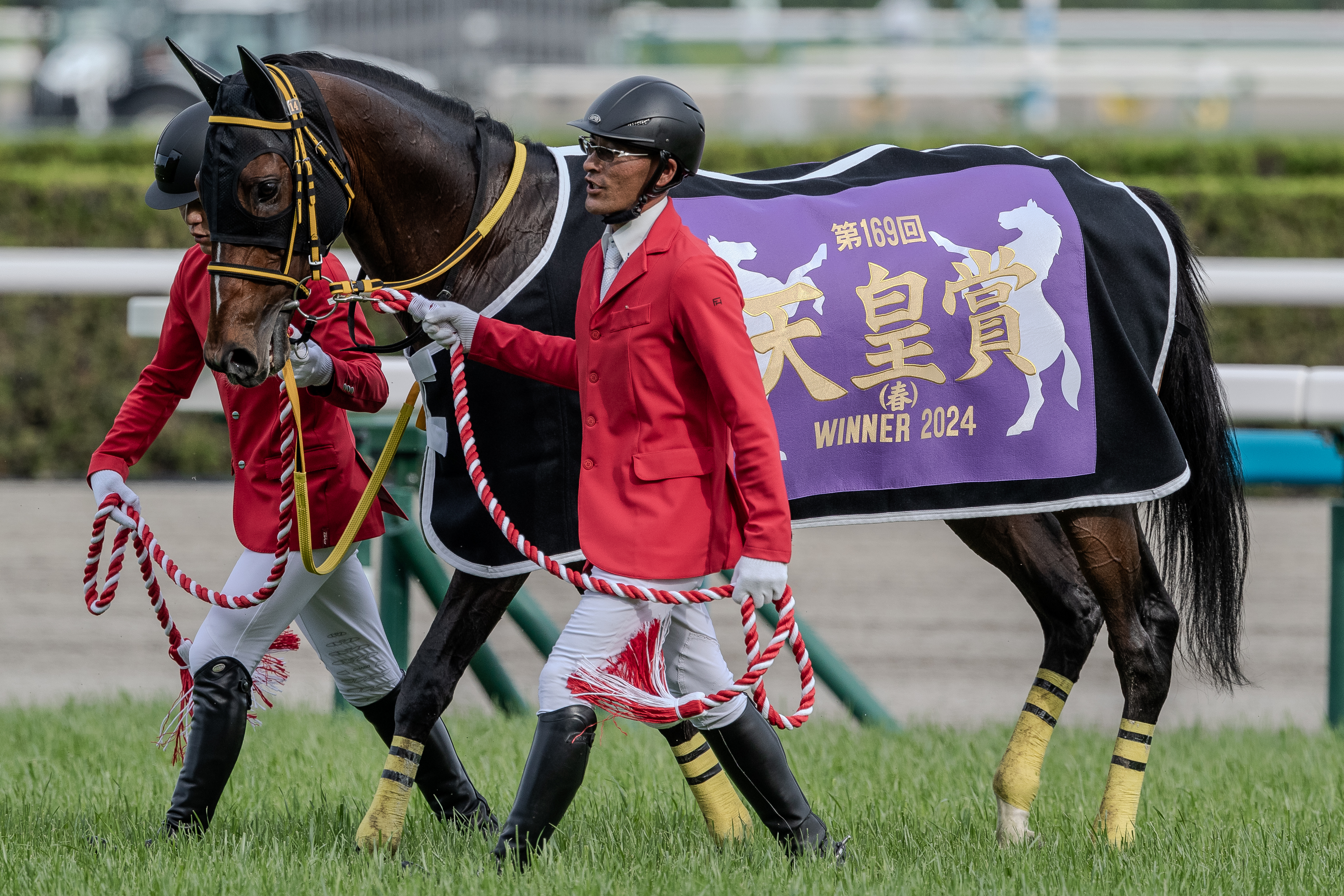
T O Royal after winning the 2024 Tenno Sho (Spring).

On 28 April, T O Royal made his second attempt at the Tenno Sho (Spring). At the gate draw, he was allotted an outside stall, Gate 14. The draw was not to the team's liking, but assistant trainer Obayashi maintained that T O Royal could still settle well in the race. When the gates opened, T O Royal broke sharply from gate 14 and settled around fourth behind the frontrunner while keeping an eye on Durezza on his inside. He pressed Durezza until the final two corners before making his move past him and the other runners, securing the lead in the home straight. T O Royal then accelerated strongly with an impressive turn of foot, pulling away easily for a two-length victory over the runner-up, Blow the Horn, to claim his first G1 win. Yuji Hishida said of the ride, "This is the happiest I've ever been in my life. I can't put it into words. I rode with the feeling of 'Watch this,' to my 20-year-old self (who was watching the Emperor's Cup, which was the catalyst for me becoming a jockey). I feel like I want to thank my past self. In the straight, I couldn't see what was behind me, so I was just pushing as hard as I could."

One week after the triumph, T O Royal was diagnosed with an avulsion fracture in his left foreleg and underwent surgery, requiring at least three months of recuperation. Okada planned for him to return in the Kyoto Daishoten in October. The return was then pushed back to the Japan Cup in November after Okada reported swelling in his left foreleg. A comeback in that race also proved impossible, and the next target became the Arima Kinen, which he ultimately failed to reach due to the prolonged recurrence of his injury.

=== 2025–2026: seven and eight-year-old seasons ===
He was expected to defend his crown in the Tenno Sho (Spring), but on 18 February he developed leg problems, was withdrawn from the race, and was put on rest. He missed the entire 2025 season and returned to the Ritto Training Center in February 2026 to resume training, but on 12 March he suffered a recurrence of suspensory ligament inflammation in his left foreleg, and Okada announced his retirement from racing the following day. On the same day, his racehorse registration was cancelled.

== Racing form ==
T O Royal won eight races, placed second once and third twice from 18 starts. This data is based on JBIS and netkeiba.

Date	Track	Race	Grade	Distance (Condition)	Entry	HN	Odds (Favoured)	Finish	Time	Margins	Jockey	Winner (Runner-up)
2020 – two-year-old season
Dec 19	Hanshin	2yo debut		1,600 m (Firm)	18	16	26.1 (6)	3rd	1:37.3	0.4	Hideaki Miyuki	Elizabeth Tower
2021 – three-year-old season
Jan 16	Chukyo	3yo maiden		1,600 m (Firm)	16	8	41.8 (9)	9th	1:35.3	1.2	Hideaki Miyuki	Raymond Barows
Mar 13	Hanshin	3yo maiden		2,000 m (Good)	15	9	23.6 (6)	4th	2:03.1	1.1	Yuji Hishida	Prognosis
Apr 4	Hanshin	3yo maiden		2,400 m (Firm)	16	11	20.0 (5)	1st	2:28.4	–0.1	Yuji Hishida	(Plume d'Or)
May 1	Tokyo	Aoba Sho	GII	2,400 m (Firm)	18	11	107.2 (15)	4th	2:25.3	0.1	Yuji Hishida	Wonderful Town
Oct 3	Chukyo	3yo+ allowance	1W	2,200 m (Firm)	16	3	4.2 (1)	1st	2:12.5	–0.2	Yuji Hishida	(Satsuki Happiness)
Oct 23	Hanshin	Hyogo Tokubetsu (ALW)	2W	2,400 m (Firm)	9	4	3.5 (3)	1st	2:26.3	–0.1	Yuji Hishida	(Machaon d'Or)
Nov 20	Hanshin	Amagasaki Tokubetsu (ALW)	3W	2,400 m (Firm)	11	11	2.2 (1)	1st	2:24.9	–0.4	Yuji Hishida	(Nihonpiro Scuro)
2022 – four-year-old season
Feb 19	Tokyo	Diamond Stakes	GIII	3,400 m (Firm)	14	9	4.0 (2)	1st	3:30.1	–0.4	Yuji Hishida	(Run for the Roses)
May 1	Hanshin	Tenno Sho (Spring)	GI	3,200 m (Good)	18	7	9.9 (4)	3rd	3:17.4	1.2	Yuji Hishida	Titleholder
Sep 25	Nakayama	Sankei Sho All Comers	GII	2,200 m (Firm)	13	10	7.3 (4)	5th	2:13.5	0.8	Yuji Hishida	Geraldina
Nov 6	Tokyo	Copa Republica Argentina	GII	2,500 m (Firm)	18	5	3.0 (1)	6th	2:31.3	0.2	Yuji Hishida	Breakup
Nov 27	Tokyo	Japan Cup	GI	2,400 m (Firm)	18	13	26.1 (8)	14th	2:25.3	1.6	Yuji Hishida	Vela Azul
2023 – five-year-old season
Nov 5	Tokyo	Copa Republica Argentina	GII	2,500 m (Firm)	18	16	18.8 (7)	10th	2:30.5	0.6	Suguru Hamanaka	Zeffiro
Dec 2	Nakayama	Stayers Stakes	GII	3,600 m (Firm)	16	11	5.6 (2)	2nd	3:45.8	0.4	Suguru Hamanaka	Iron Barows
2024 – six-year-old season
Feb 17	Tokyo	Diamond Stakes	GIII	3,400 m (Firm)	10	9	3.1 (2)	1st	3:30.2	–0.0	Yuji Hishida	(Saliera)
Mar 17	Hanshin	Hanshin Daishoten	GII	3,000 m (Good)	15	6	3.3 (2)	1st	3:06.8	–0.8	Yuji Hishida	(Warp Speed)
Apr 28	Kyoto	Tenno Sho (Spring)	GI	3,200 m (Firm)	17	14	2.8 (1)	1st	3:14.2	–0.3	Yuji Hishida	(Blow the Horn)

Legend:
Turf

== Stud career ==
T O Royal now stands as a stallion at East Stud in Urakawa, Hokkaido. His initial stud fee was set at 500,000 JPY but was reduced to 400,000 JPY, payable upon confirmation of a successful conception.

== Pedigree ==
Pedigree of T O Royal, Bay, Colt, 2018
Sire Leontes dk. b. 2013	King Kamehameha b. 2001	Kingmambo (USA)	Mr. Prospector (USA)
Sire Leontes dk. b. 2013	King Kamehameha b. 2001	Kingmambo (USA)	Miesque (USA)
Sire Leontes dk. b. 2013	King Kamehameha b. 2001	Manfath (IRE)	Last Tycoon (IRE)
Sire Leontes dk. b. 2013	King Kamehameha b. 2001	Manfath (IRE)	Pilot Bird (GB)
Sire Leontes dk. b. 2013	Cesario blk. 2002	Special Week	Sunday Silence (USA)
Sire Leontes dk. b. 2013	Cesario blk. 2002	Special Week	Campaign Girl
Sire Leontes dk. b. 2013	Cesario blk. 2002	Kirov Premiere (GB)	Sadler's Wells (USA)
Sire Leontes dk. b. 2013	Cesario blk. 2002	Kirov Premiere (GB)	Querida (IRE)
Dam Meisho Ohi dk. b. 2008	Manhattan Cafe br. 1998	Sunday Silence (USA)	Halo (USA)
Dam Meisho Ohi dk. b. 2008	Manhattan Cafe br. 1998	Sunday Silence (USA)	Wishing Well (USA)
Dam Meisho Ohi dk. b. 2008	Manhattan Cafe br. 1998	Subtle Change (IRE)	Law Society (USA)
Dam Meisho Ohi dk. b. 2008	Manhattan Cafe br. 1998	Subtle Change (IRE)	Santa Luciana (GER)
Dam Meisho Ohi dk. b. 2008	Alpine Rose (USA) dk. b. 1999	Kris S. (USA)	Roberto (USA)
Dam Meisho Ohi dk. b. 2008	Alpine Rose (USA) dk. b. 1999	Kris S. (USA)	Sharp Queen (USA)
Dam Meisho Ohi dk. b. 2008	Alpine Rose (USA) dk. b. 1999	Amizette (USA)	Forty Niner (USA)
Dam Meisho Ohi dk. b. 2008	Alpine Rose (USA) dk. b. 1999	Amizette (USA)	Courtly Dee (USA) (F.no: A4)

- Inbreeding: 3 x 4 to Sunday Silence, 4 x 5 to Mr. Prospector (Forty Niner's sire), 5 x 5 to Hail to Reason (Halo's and Roberto's sire)
