= Blow the Horn =

Japanese racehorse (b. 2019)

Blow the Horn ブローザホーン
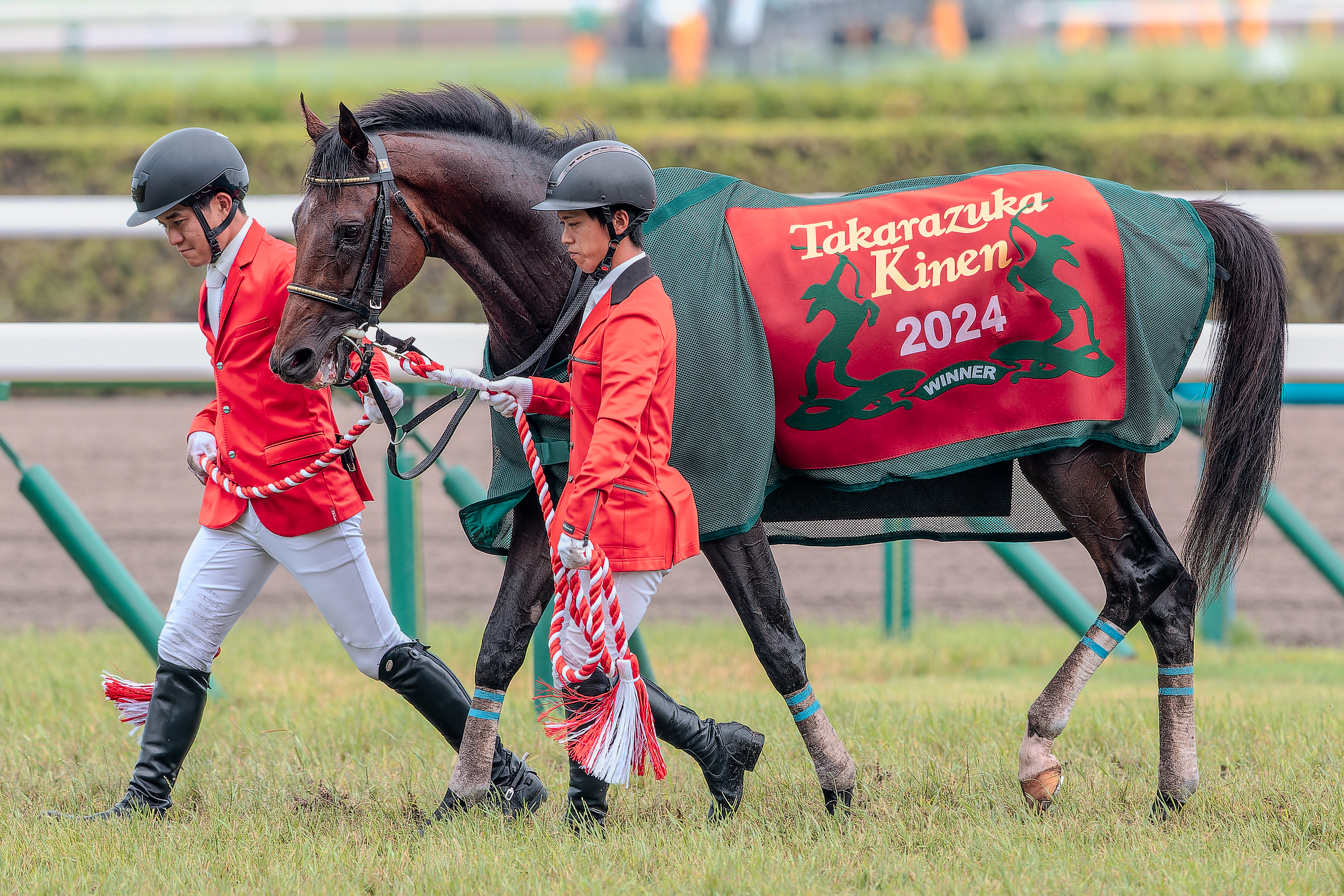
- Blow the Horn after winning the 2024 Takarazuka Kinen
- Breed: Thoroughbred
- Sire: Epiphaneia
- Grandsire: Symboli Kris S
- Dam: Halteclere
- Damsire: Durandal
- Sex: Stallion
- Foaled: May 10, 2019 (age 7)
- Country: Japan
- Breeder: Okada Stud
- Owner: Makio Okada
- Racing colours
- Trainer: Eiji Nakano ->Tatsuya Yoshioka
- Jockey: Akira Sugawara
- Record: 26: 7-3-5-11
- Earnings: 502,483,000JPY

Major wins
- Takarazuka Kinen (2024); Nikkei Shinshun Hai (2024)

Blow the Horn (Japanese: ブローザホーン; foaled May 10, 2019) is a retired Japanese racehorse.

== Racing career ==
=== 2021: two-year-old season ===
Blow the Horn made his debut in a debut race for 2-year-olds held at Tokyo Racecourse with Keita Tosaki as his jockey. The horse raced from the rear but finished fourth. On his next race he came in second after running the fastest in the last 3 furlongs.

=== 2022: three-year-old season ===
Blow the Horn ran three maiden races at Nakayama Racecourse, before running another maiden race at Fukushima Racecourse, but was only successful in placing 3rd on one of the races. On his 6th race of the season, held at Hakodate Racecourse, Blow the Horn ran as a pace chaser rather than a late runner, ultimately finishing third. On his next race, he ran from the middle of the pack before winning his first victory.

After a 4-month break, Blow the Horn ran an allowance race held on November 19 where he finished second. In the race after that, an allowance race held on December 18, the horse once again raced as a pace chaser before winning his second race.

=== 2023: four-year-old season ===
Blow the Horn started the season off with the Uminonakamichi Tokubetsu held at Kokura Racecourse with Atsuya Nishimura as his jockey, but finished fifth. On the race after that, the Itako Tokubetsu, with Akira Sugawara as his jockey, Blow the Horn once again ran as a pace chaser before taking the lead on the home stretch and winning his third race. His next race, the Karasuma Stakes held at Kyoto Racecourse on May 7, the horse won by five lengths even under the muddy conditions after running as a pace chaser.

While there were initial plans to run him in the Grade I Takarazuka Kinen as his first graded race, his connections instead opted to enter him in to the Grade III Hakodate Kinen instead. However, in that race, he finished third behind Rousham Park. Blow the Horn would then go on to race in the Listed Sapporo Nikkei Open, where he would go on to win the race with a six length lead. After this race, he would be entered in to the Grade II Kyōto Daishōten where he was the second favored to win, but did not finish after suffering from atrial fibrillation mid-race.

=== 2024: five-year-old season ===
Blow the Horn started the season off with the Grade II Nikkei Shinshun Hai where he was the most favored to win. He was placed in the middle of the pack for most of the race, before taking the lead and winning the race. This marked Blow the Horn's first graded race victory, as well as the final graded race victory for his trainer, Eiji Nakano, who was scheduled to retire at the end of February that year. Due to Nakano's retirement, the horse was transferred from Nakano's stable in Miho Training Center to Tatsuya Yoshioka's stable in Ritto Training Center.

On his first race after the transfer, the Grade II Hanshin Daishōten, the horse was once again the most favored to win but finished third behind T O Royal. After this, the horse was entered in to the Grade I Tennō Shō (Spring) but once again finished second behind T O Royal. On his next race, the Takarazuka Kinen which was held at Kyoto Racecourse rather than the usual Hanshin Racecourse due to renovations, the horse ran from the rear of the pack before taking the lead from the outside on the final stretch, winning his first Grade I race. This also marked the first Grade I race victory for jockey Sugawara and trainer Yoshioka. Following this race, some dubbed Blow the Horn "the demon of bad tracks" as the race was held on soft grounds.

After a summer break, the horse once again entered the Kyōto Daishōten, but finished last. His next races showed similar results, having finished 12th in both the Japan Cup and the Arima Kinen.

=== 2025 and 2026: six-and-seven-year-old seasons ===
Blow the Horn started his six year old season with the Hanshin Daishōten, where he was the only Grade I winner in the field, but only managed to finish third. On May 4, Blow the Horn ran the Tennō Shō (Spring) but finished 8th. Following the race, the horse showed signs of inflammation on his right foreleg's fetlock. The horse underwent an echography inspection, and was diagnosed with desmitits, forcing him to be put out to pasture to recover for the remainder of the year.

Blow the Horn returned to the Yoshioka stable on February of that year, but while preparing to race him for the Hanshin Daishōten, the horse's right foreleg once again showed symptoms of desmititis. As the diagnosis was that it would take at least a year for the horse to recover, and that there were possibilities that the symptom may come back, it was decided that the horse would be retired. After retirement, Blow the Horn would become a riding horse at the Tokyo Equestrian Park.

== Racing statistics ==
The following racing form is based on information available on netkeiba.com and JBIS-Search.

| Date | Track | Race | Grade | Distance (Condition) | Entry | HN | Odds (Favored) | Finish | Time | Margins | Jockey | Winner (Runner-up) |
|---|---|---|---|---|---|---|---|---|---|---|---|---|
2021 – two-year-old season
| Nov 27 | Tokyo | 2YO Debut | | 1600 m (Firm) | 16 | 15 | 13.3 (4) | 4th | 1:37.3 | 0.8 | Keita Tosaki | Koki |
| Dec 25 | Nakayama | 2YO Maiden | | 1600 m (Good) | 16 | 12 | 25.3 (6) | 2nd | 1:37.0 | 0.1 | Hironobu Tanabe | Nishino Megrez |
2022 – three-year-old season
| Jan 9 | Nakayama | 3YO Maiden | | 1600 m (Good) | 16 | 16 | 7.5 (5) | 9th | 1:35.6 | 0.8 | Keita Tosaki | Go Go Yutaka |
| Feb 27 | Nakayama | 3YO Maiden | | 2000 m (Firm) | 16 | 16 | 9.2 (5) | 3rd | 2:01.8 | 0.5 | Takuya Ono | Shaman's Cave |
| Mar 13 | Nakayama | 3YO Maiden | | 2000 m (Firm) | 17 | 15 | 7.5 (4) | 5th | 2:01.7 | 1.2 | Hironobu Tanabe | Tacit |
| Apr 2 | Nakayama | 3YO Maiden | | 2000 m (Good) | 18 | 9 | 22.4 (7) | 4th | 2:02.9 | 0.7 | Hironobu Tanabe | Vibrazione |
| Apr 24 | Fukushima | 3YO Maiden | | 2000 m (Firm) | 16 | 1 | 4.5 (2) | 8th | 2:02.0 | 0.7 | Hiroto Mayuzumi | Eglantyne |
| Jun 11 | Hakodate | 3YO Maiden | | 2000 m (Firm) | 11 | 6 | 5.6 (2) | 3rd | 2:01.5 | 0.3 | Takeshi Yokoyama | Notre Promesse |
| Jun 25 | Hakodate | 3YO Maiden | | 2000 m (Good) | 12 | 7 | 5.8 (3) | 1st | 2:02.5 | -0.1 | Takeshi Yokoyama | (Bear the Bell) |
| Nov 19 | Fukushima | 3+YO Allowance | 1-win | 2000 m (Firm) | 16 | 1 | 32.4 (8) | 2nd | 2:01.7 | 0.0 | Yamato Tsunoda | Enishino Uta |
| Dec 18 | Nakayama | 3+YO Allowance | 1-win | 2500 m (Good) | 12 | 3 | 3.6 (1) | 1st | 2:38.6 | -0.3 | Keita Tosaki | (Bomber) |
2023 – four-year-old season
| Jan 22 | Kokura | Uminonakamichi Tokubetsu | 1-win | 2600 m (Firm) | 13 | 8 | 14.0 (6) | 5th | 2:42.0 | 0.4 | Atsuya Nishimura | Meisho Bregue |
| Mar 4 | Nakayama | Itako Tokubetsu | 2-win | 2500 m (Firm) | 11 | 10 | 4.7 (3) | 1st | 2:31.5 | -0.5 | Akira Sugawara | (End Roll) |
| May 7 | Kyoto | Karasuma Stakes | 3-win | 2200 m (Heavy) | 15 | 9 | 3.5 (1) | 1st | 2:14.9 | -0.8 | Yasunari Iwata | (Lord Plaisir) |
| Jul 16 | Hakodate | Hakodate Kinen | 3 | 2000 m (Good) | 16 | 8 | 5.0 (2) | 3rd | 2:01.8 | 0.4 | Yasunari Iwata | Rousham Park |
| Aug 5 | Sapporo | Sapporo Nikkei Open | L | 2600 m (Good) | 14 | 6 | 2.3 (1) | 1st | 2:42.0 | -1.0 | Yasunari Iwata | (Achernar Star) |
| Oct 9 | Kyoto | Kyōto Daishōten | 2 | 2400 m (Soft) | 14 | 1 | 5.0 (2) | Did Not Finish | | | Akira Sugawara | Pradaria |
2024 – five-year-old season
| Jan 14 | Kyoto | Nikkei Shinshun Hai | 2 | 2400 m (Firm) | 14 | 8 | 4.1 (1) | 1st | 2:23.7 | -0.1 | Akira Sugawara | (Savona) |
| Mar 17 | Hanshin | Hanshin Daishōten | 2 | 3000 m (Good) | 15 | 2 | 3.2 (1) | 3rd | 3:07.6 | 0.8 | Akira Sugawara | T O Royal |
| Apr 28 | Kyoto | Tennō Shō (Spring) | 1 | 3200 m (Firm) | 15 | 2 | 8.8 (5) | 2nd | 3:14.5 | 0.3 | Akira Sugawara | T O Royal |
| Jun 23 | Kyoto | Takarazuka Kinen | 1 | 2200 m (Soft) | 13 | 12 | 7.5 (3) | 1st | 2:12.0 | -0.3 | Akira Sugawara | (Sol Oriens) |
| Oct 6 | Kyoto | Kyōto Daishōten | 2 | 2400 m (Firm) | 11 | 11 | 2.6 (1) | 11th | 2:25.3 | 2.4 | Akira Sugawara | Chevalier Rose |
| Nov 24 | Tokyo | Japan Cup | 1 | 2400 m (Firm) | 14 | 2 | 61.4 (10) | 12th | 2:26.6 | 1.1 | Akira Sugawara | Do Deuce |
| Dec 22 | Nakayama | Arima Kinen | 1 | 2500 m (Firm) | 15 | 4 | 35.1 (11) | 12th | 2:33.1 | 1.3 | Akira Sugawara | Regaleira |
2025 – five-year-old season
| Mar 23 | Hanshin | Hanshin Daishōten | 2 | 3000 m (Firm) | 11 | 5 | 8.0 (5) | 3rd | 3:04.4 | 1.1 | Akira Sugawara | Sunrise Earth |
| May 4 | Kyoto | Tennō Shō (Spring) | 1 | 3200 m (Firm) | 15 | 3 | 11.4 (5) | 8th | 3:15.9 | 1.9 | Akira Sugawara | Redentor |

== Pedigree ==
Pedigree of Blow the Horn(JPN)
| Sire Epiphaneia 2010 b. | Symboli Kris S 1999 dk. b. | Kris S. | Roberto |
| Sire Epiphaneia 2010 b. | Symboli Kris S 1999 dk. b. | Kris S. | Sharp Queen |
| Sire Epiphaneia 2010 b. | Symboli Kris S 1999 dk. b. | Tee Kay | Gold Meridian |
| Sire Epiphaneia 2010 b. | Symboli Kris S 1999 dk. b. | Tee Kay | Tri Argo |
| Sire Epiphaneia 2010 b. | Cesario; 2002 blk. | Special Week | Sunday Silence |
| Sire Epiphaneia 2010 b. | Cesario; 2002 blk. | Special Week | Campaign Girl |
| Sire Epiphaneia 2010 b. | Cesario; 2002 blk. | Kirov Premiere | Sadler's Wells |
| Sire Epiphaneia 2010 b. | Cesario; 2002 blk. | Kirov Premiere | Querida |
| Dam Helteclere 2011 ch. | Durandal; 1999 ch. | Sunday Silence | Halo |
| Dam Helteclere 2011 ch. | Durandal; 1999 ch. | Sunday Silence | Wishing Well |
| Dam Helteclere 2011 ch. | Durandal; 1999 ch. | Sawayaka Princess | Northern Taste |
| Dam Helteclere 2011 ch. | Durandal; 1999 ch. | Sawayaka Princess | Scotch Princess |
| Dam Helteclere 2011 ch. | Joy Asseraine; 1997 ch. | Forty Niner | Mr. Prospector |
| Dam Helteclere 2011 ch. | Joy Asseraine; 1997 ch. | Forty Niner | File |
| Dam Helteclere 2011 ch. | Joy Asseraine; 1997 ch. | Assertaine | Assert |
| Dam Helteclere 2011 ch. | Joy Asseraine; 1997 ch. | Assertaine | Obeah |

- Blow the Horn is inbred 4 x 3 to Sunday Silence, meaning that this stallion, appears in both the fourth and third generations of his pedigree.
