= Justin Palace =

Japanese racehorse (foaled 2019)

Justin Palace ジャスティンパレス
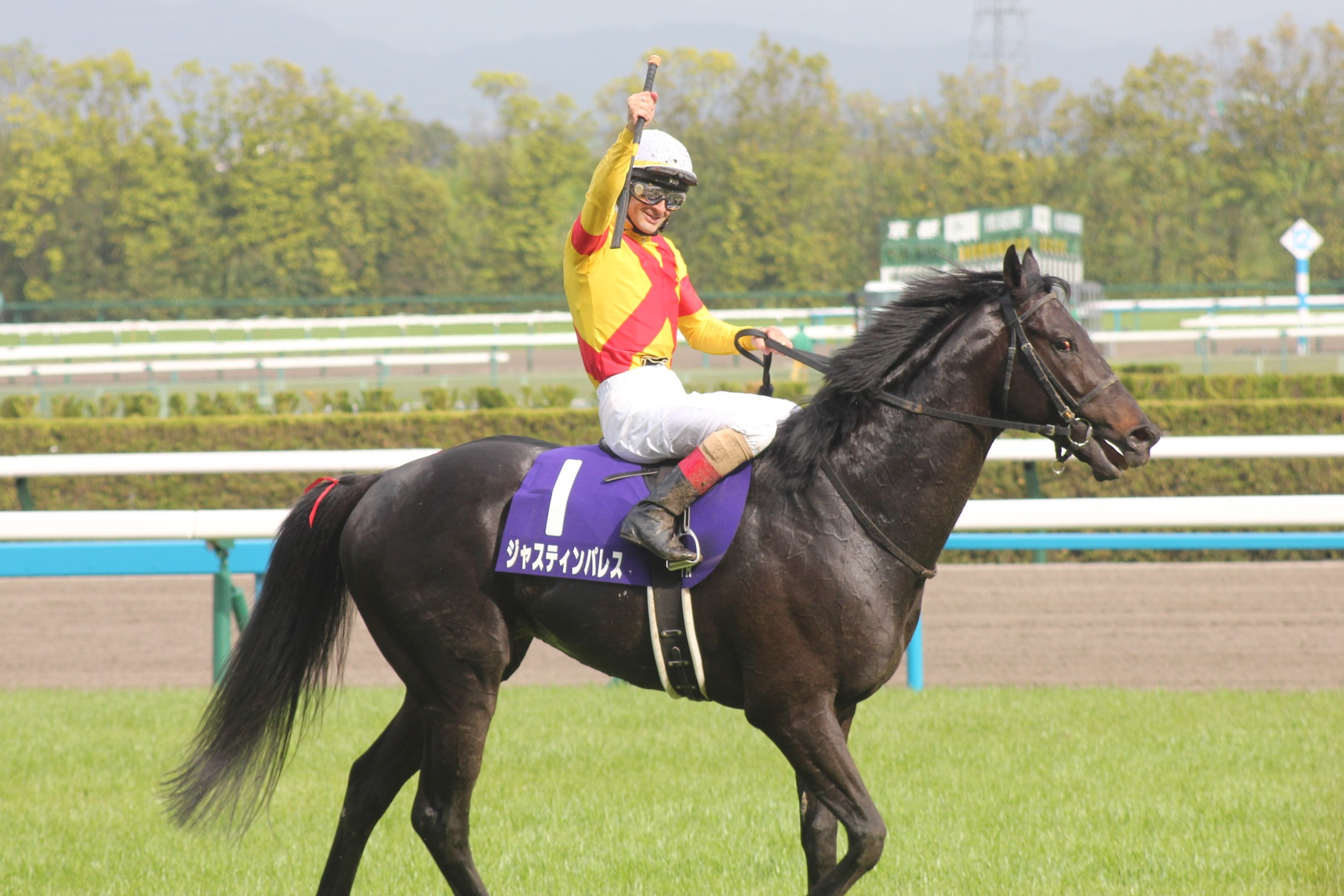
- Justin Palace after winning the 2023 Spring Tenno Sho
- Breed: Thoroughbred
- Sire: Deep Impact
- Grandsire: Sunday Silence
- Dam: Palace Rumor
- Damsire: Curlin
- Sex: Stallion
- Foaled: April 12, 2019 (age 7); Abira, Hokkaido
- Country: Japan
- Color: Brown
- Breeder: Northern Farm
- Owner: Masahiro Miki
- Racing colours
- Trainer: Haruki Sugiyama
- Jockey: Christophe Lemaire; Katsuma Sameshima
- Record: 24:5-2-4-13
- Earnings: 1,032,763,000 JPY; JPN: 987,820,000 JPY; UAE: 300,000 USD

Major wins
- Tenno Sho (Spring) (2023); Kobe Shimbun Hai (2022); Hanshin Daishōten (2023)
- Last updated on February 9, 2026

Justin Palace (ジャスティンパレス; foaled April 12, 2019) is a retired Japanese racehorse.

== Background ==
Justin Palace was foaled at Northern Farm on April 12, 2019. His sire, Deep Impact, was the undefeated winner of the Japanese Triple Crown in 2005 and JRA Hall of Fame inductee who was also a highly successful sire; having sired two JRA Hall of Fame inductees, Gentildonna and Contrail, among many other Grade I winners both in Japan and abroad. His dam, Palace Rumour, was an American racehorse who won the 2006 Audubon Oaks, and had become a successful broodmare who foaled the 2013 Belmont Stakes winner Palace Malice and the 2023 Stayers Stakes winner Iron Barows.

The horse's name is based on the "Justin" kanmei (冠名) eponym used by his owner, Masahiro Miki, and the name of the horse's dam. Miki had bought the horse at the Yearling Session of JRHA Select Sale for 209 million yen (including consumption tax). After the purchase, he was sent to early training at Takayuki Ito's stable in the Northern Farm before being transferred to Haruki Sugiyama's stable in Rittō, Shiga.

== Racing career ==
=== 2021: two-year-old season ===
Justin Palace ran his first race at a debut race for two year olds at Chukyo Racecourse over a distance of 2000 meters with Christophe Lemaire as his jockey. Being the most favored to win, he would win this race by a length and a half. He would then go on to also win the Kigiku Sho, where he would overtake Meisho Gekirin, who was the front runner of the race.

Following his consecutive wins, Justin Palace would run his first graded race, the Hopeful Stakes, where the horse had, despite stumbling at the start, was able to place himself in the pack, and while he tried to contest the lead, he was still unable to catch the winner, Killer Ability, who won the race with a length and a half lead against him.

=== 2022: three-year-old season ===
Justin Palace started his three-year-old season with the first leg of the Japanese Triple Crown, the Satsuki Shō, where he finished at 9th place. He would then run the Tōkyō Yūshun, the second leg of the Japanese Triple Crown, where he once again finished at 9th place.

After spending the summer off, he would enter the Kobe Shimbun Hai with Katsuma Sameshima as his new jockey. In that race, he would take over the lead on the final stretch after running the middle of the pack, marking his first grade race win by a 3 and a half lengths lead. Later, at the Kikuka-shō, the final leg of the Japanese Triple Crown, he would finish third behind Ask Victor More in spite of his starting post being on the outside of the course.

Justin Palace would finish the season with the Arima Kinen, where he finished seventh behind Equinox.

=== 2023: four-year-old season ===
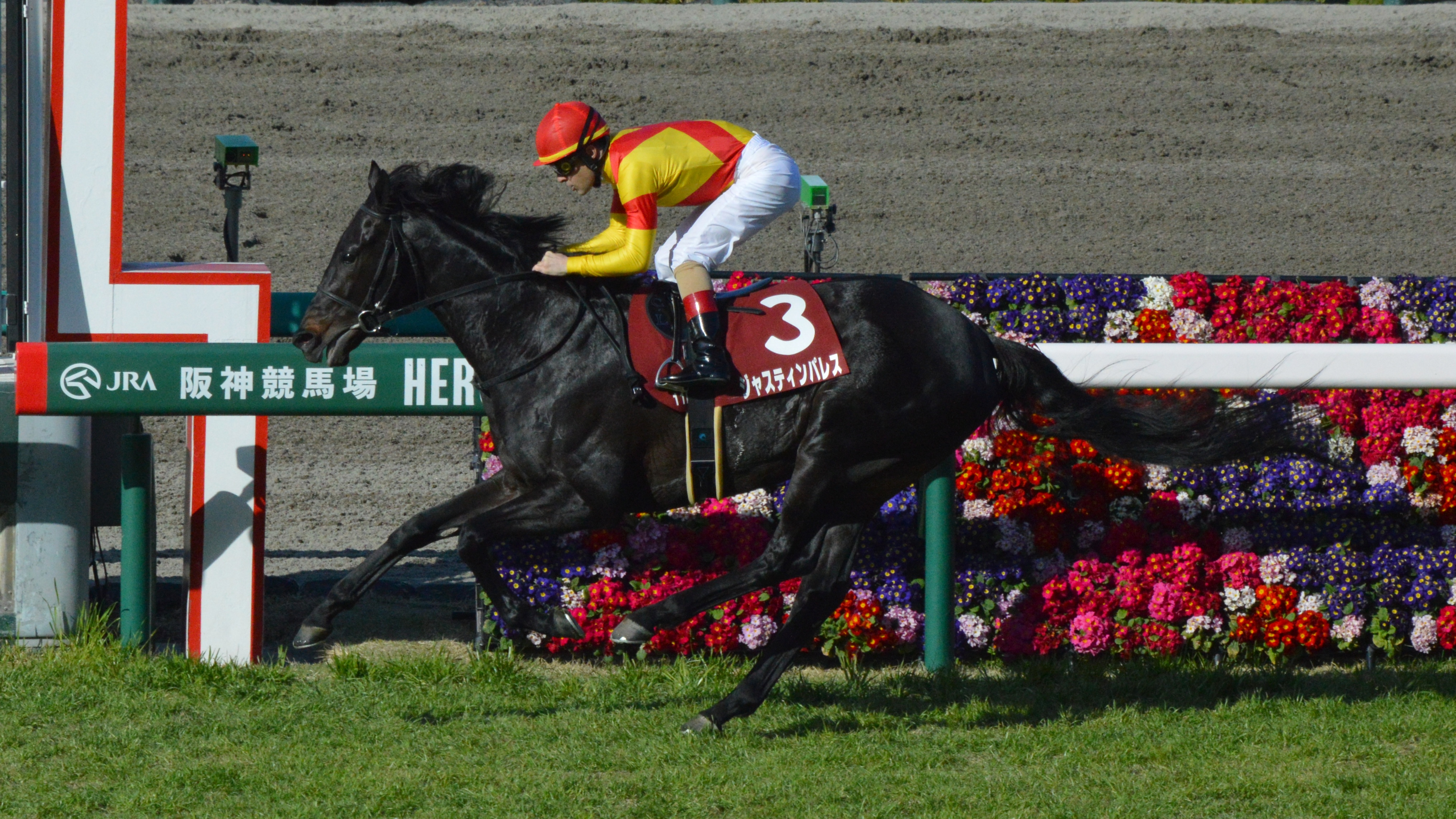
Hanshin Daishōten

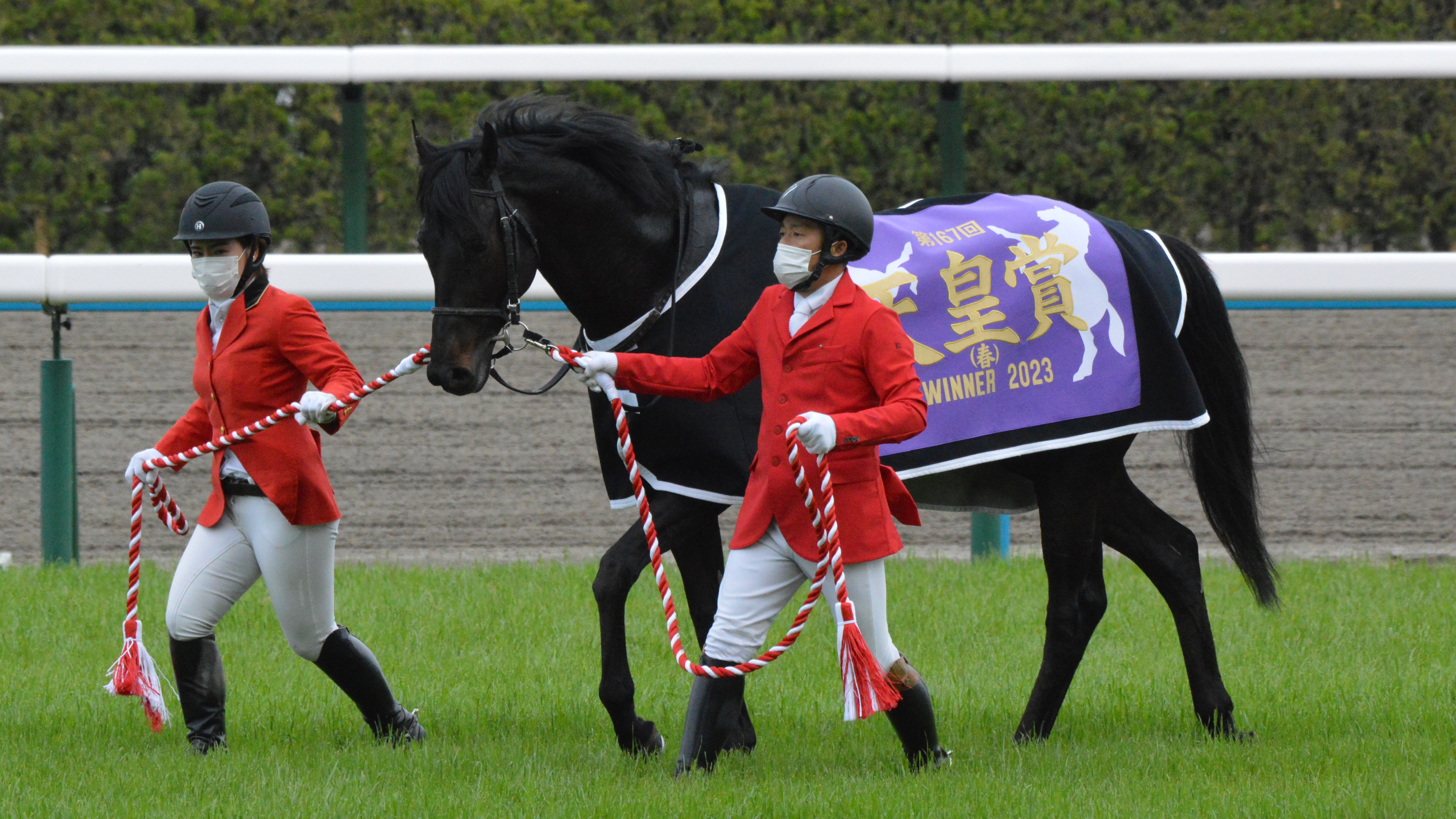
Spring Tennō Shō

Justin Palace started his four-year-old season with the Hanshin Daishōten, which is a trial race for the Spring Tennō Shō. During the race, he ran third for most of the race before taking the lead on the home stretch, staving off Boldog Hos' attempt to take over, before winning the race by a length and three-quarters.

At the Spring Tennō Shō, Justin Palace would run in the middle of the pack, saving his pace, before surpassing the other horses on the home stretch, including Deep Bond who had initially taken the lead, and winning the race by a two and a half length lead. This was Justin Palace's first Grade I victory after six starts, and marked the 71st JRA Grade I win for a Deep Impact progeny, tying Sunday Silence's record of the most JRA Grade I races won by progeny, and also marked the 44th JRA Grade I race win for jockey Lemaire and the 5th Grade I race win for trainer Sugiyama.

Following this win, Justin Palace would then enter the Takarazuka Kinen, with Sameshima returning as jockey. In the race, he would race from behind before starting to advance before the fourth corner. Sameshima would accidentally drop his riding crop while attempting to take the lead in the final stretch, but was ultimately passed by Equinox and finished third.

After taking the summer off, Justin Palace would race the Autumn Tennō Shō, with Takeshi Yokoyama as his new jockey. He had a poor start, and had to run in the back of the pack, but as the race ran at a high pace with front runner Jack d'Or running at a high speed, this ended up benefitting him. On the final stretch, he would chase Equinox who had taken the lead but was unable to, finishing second with a two and a half length gap between the two horses. He would then go on to once again race in the Arima. At the Arima, where he was the most favored to win, the horse did not start well and ran in the back of the pack. In spite of this, the horse tried to take the lead from the outside on the home stretch alongside Do Deuce, but was unable to keep up with him and ultimately finished fourth.

=== 2024: five-year-old season ===
Justin Palace started the season off with his first race abroad, the Dubai Sheema Classic, with João Moreira as his new jockey. However, he was not successful and finished at fourth in that race.

After racing in Dubai, Justin Palace returned to Japan to once again race in the Takarazuka Kinen, with Lemaire returning as jockey for the first time since the Spring Tennō Shō, but finished at an unimpressive 10th place. After the race, Lemaire blamed the poor track condition, stating "given he is a Deep (progeny), perhaps he does not do well in soft tracks. He was not pushing forward on the stretch after all."

Justin Palace would then race in the Autumn Tennō Shō again, this time with Ryusei Sakai as his new jockey. During the race, the horse ran in the middle of the pack and saved his pace. On the home stretch, Sakai chose to run the horse closer to the wire as it seemed that the horse had no room to overtake from the outside. While the horse was able to push forward, he still was not able to win, having finished fourth behind front runner Ho O Biscuits, who finished third in the race. As a result of him cutting to the inside, the stewards fined Sakai 50,000 JPY for cutting off Stella Veloce and North Bridge. He would then race the Japan Cup with Cristian Demuro as his jockey, but could only manage to finish fifth. Finally, he would finish the season off with the Arima Kinen, where he ran in the middle of the pack for most of the race, but was unable to contest the lead and once again finished fifth.

=== 2025: six-year-old season ===
Justin Palace raced the Ōsaka Hai and the Spring Tennō Shō but finished at sixth place each time. Later, at the Takarazuka Kinen, Justin Palace was partnered with Michael Dee, where despite being only the tenth most favored, the horse managed to finish at third place. Justin Palace would also finish third in the Autumn Tennō Shō as well.

Prior to racing the Autumn Tennō Shō, Sugiyama announced that the horse would be retired from racing at the end of the year, where he would stand stud at the Arrow Stud in Shinhidaka, Hokkaido.

He would then enter the Japan Cup, where he would attempt to contest the lead from the outside, but once again finished fifth. Afterwards, at the Arima Kinen, the horse finished 7th behind Museum Mile after running from the rear of the pack and trying to take over the lead.

His registration as a race horse with the Japan Racing Association was withdrawn on January 4, 2026.

== Racing statistics ==
The following racing form is based on information available on JBIS-Search and netkeiba.

Date	Track	Race	Grade	Distance (Condition)	Entry	HN	Odds (Favored)	Finish	Time	Margins	Jockey	Winner (Runner-up)
2021 – two-year-old season
Sept 12	Chukyo	Maiden race		2000 m (Firm)	5	4	1.5 (1)	1st	2:02.3	-0.3	Christophe Lemaire	(Academy)
Nov 14	Hanshin	Kigiku Sho	ALW	2000 m (Firm)	6	1	1.9 (1)	1st	2:03.3	-0.2	Christophe Lemaire	(Meisho Gekirin)
Dec 28	Nakayama	Hopeful Stakes	1	2000 m (Firm)	15	8	8.8 (4)	2nd	2:00.8	0.2	Cristian Demuro	Killer Ability
2022 – three-year-old season
Apr 17	Nakayama	Satsuki Shō	1	2000 m (Firm)	18	10	20.9 (9)	9th	2:00.5	0.8	Mirco Demuro	Geoglyph
May 29	Tokyo	Tōkyō Yūshun	1	2400 m (Firm)	18	9	43.1 (10)	9th	2:23.2	1.3	Mirco Demuro	Do Deuce
Sep 25	Chukyo	Kobe Shimbun Hai	2	2200 m (Firm)	17	7	11.0 (5)	1st	2:11.1	-0.6	Katsuma Sameshima	(Yamanin Zest)
Oct 23	Hanshin	Kikuka-shō	1	3000 m (Firm)	18	17	9.7 (4)	3rd	3:02.5	0.1	Katsuma Sameshima	Ask Victor More
Dec 25	Nakayama	Arima Kinen	1	2500 m (Firm)	16	10	18.9 (7)	7th	2:33.5	1.1	Tom Marquand	Equinox
2023 – four-year-old season
Mar 19	Hanshin	Hanshin Daishōten	2	3000 m (Firm)	14	3	3.1 (2)	1st	3:06.1	-0.3	Christophe Lemaire	(Boldog Hos)
Apr 30	Kyoto	Tennō Shō (Spring)	1	3200 m (Good)	17	1	4.3 (2)	1st	3:16.1	-0.4	Christophe Lemaire	(Deep Bond)
Jun 25	Hanshin	Takarazuka Kinen	1	2200 m (Firm)	17	9	8.5 (2)	3rd	2:11.4	0.2	Katsuma Sameshima	Equinox
Oct 29	Tokyo	Tenno Sho (Autumn)	1	2000 m (Firm)	11	6	35.6 (6)	2nd	1:55.6	0.4	Takeshi Yokoyama	Equinox
Dec 24	Nakayama	Arima Kinen	1	2500 m (Firm)	16	10	3.6 (1)	4th	2:31.2	0.3	Takeshi Yokoyama	Do Deuce
2024 – five-year-old season
Mar 30	Meydan	Dubai Sheema Classic	1	2410 m (Firm)	12	2	7.6 (4)	4th	2:27.2	0.5	João Moreira	Rebel's Romance
Jun 23	Kyoto	Takarazuka Kinen	1	2200 m (Yielding)	13	2	3.7 (2)	10th	2:13.6	1.6	Christophe Lemaire	Blow the Horn
Oct 27	Tokyo	Tenno Sho (Autumn)	1	2000 m (Firm)	15	11	10.9 (5)	5th	1:57.6	0.4	Ryusei Sakai	Do Deuce
Nov 24	Tokyo	Japan Cup	1	2400 m (Firm)	14	4	6.2 (3)	5th	2:26.0	0.5	Cristian Demuro	Do Deuce
Dec 22	Nakayama	Arima Kinen	1	2500 m (Firm)	15	11	10.9 (5)	5th	2:32.3	0.5	Ryusei Sakai	Regaleira
2025 – six-year-old season
Apr 6	Hanshin	Ōsaka Hai	1	2000 m (Firm)	15	6	10.4 (6)	6th	1:56.6	0.4	Katsuma Sameshima	Bellagio Opera
May 4	Kyoto	Tennō Shō (Spring)	1	3200 m (Firm)	15	13	4.9 (3)	6th	3:15.1	1.1	Katsuma Sameshima	Redentor
Jun 15	Hanshin	Takarazuka Kinen	1	2200 m (Yielding)	17	7	31.5 (10)	3rd	2:11.6	0.5	Michael Dee	Meisho Tabaru
Nov 2	Tokyo	Tenno Sho (Autumn)	1	2000 m (Firm)	14	3	20.4 (8)	3rd	1:58.8	0.2	Taisei Danno	Masquerade Ball
Nov 30	Tokyo	Japan Cup	1	2400 m (Firm)	17	1	12.2 (5)	5th	2:20.9	0.6	Cristian Demuro	Calandagan
Dec 28	Nakayama	Arima Kinen	1	2500 m (Firm)	16	3	12.7 (5)	7th	2:32.1	0.6	Taisei Danno	Museum Mile

== Pedigree ==
Pedigree of Justin Palace
Sire Deep Impact 2002 b.	Sunday Silence; 1986 br.	Halo	Hail to Reason
Sire Deep Impact 2002 b.	Sunday Silence; 1986 br.	Halo	Cosmah
Sire Deep Impact 2002 b.	Sunday Silence; 1986 br.	Wishing Well	Understanding
Sire Deep Impact 2002 b.	Sunday Silence; 1986 br.	Wishing Well	Mountain Flower
Sire Deep Impact 2002 b.	Wind in Her Hair; 1991 b.	Alzao	Lyphard
Sire Deep Impact 2002 b.	Wind in Her Hair; 1991 b.	Alzao	Lady Rebecca
Sire Deep Impact 2002 b.	Wind in Her Hair; 1991 b.	Burghclere	Busted
Sire Deep Impact 2002 b.	Wind in Her Hair; 1991 b.	Burghclere	Highclere
Dam Palace Rumor 2003 b.	Royal Anthem; 1995 b.	Theatrical	Nureyev
Dam Palace Rumor 2003 b.	Royal Anthem; 1995 b.	Theatrical	Tree of Knowledge
Dam Palace Rumor 2003 b.	Royal Anthem; 1995 b.	In Neon	Ack Ack
Dam Palace Rumor 2003 b.	Royal Anthem; 1995 b.	In Neon	Shamara
Dam Palace Rumor 2003 b.	Whisperifyoudare; 1997 b.	Red Ransom	Roberto
Dam Palace Rumor 2003 b.	Whisperifyoudare; 1997 b.	Red Ransom	Arabia
Dam Palace Rumor 2003 b.	Whisperifyoudare; 1997 b.	Stellar Affair	Skywalker
Dam Palace Rumor 2003 b.	Whisperifyoudare; 1997 b.	Stellar Affair	Fawn and Hahn
