= Hanshin Daishōten =

Hanshin Daishōten 阪神大賞典
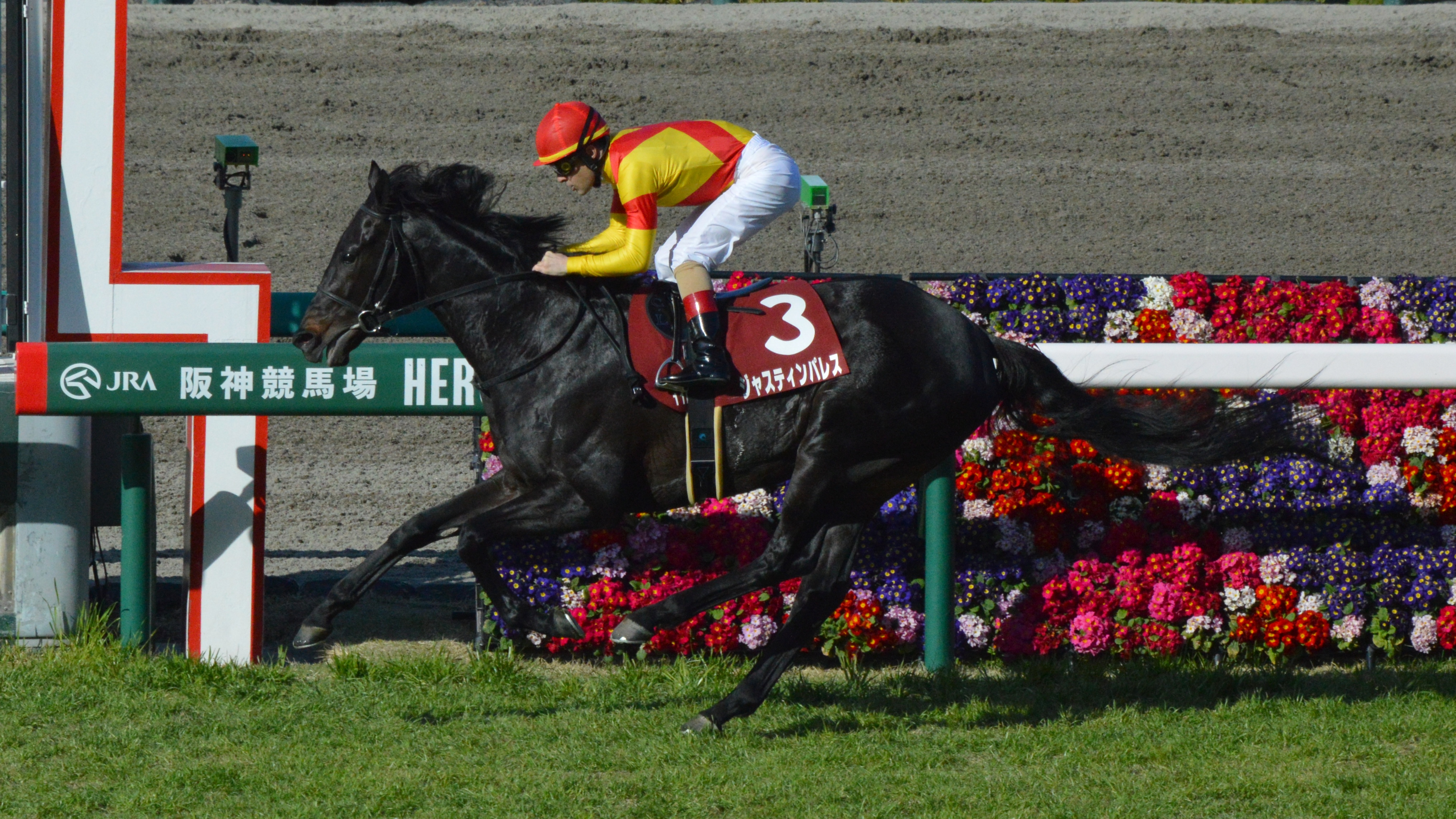
- 2023 Hanshin Daishoten
- Class: Grade 2
- Location: Hanshin Racecourse, Takarazuka, Hyogo
- Inaugurated: 1953
- Race type: Thoroughbred Flat racing

Race information
- Distance: 3000 metres
- Surface: Turf
- Track: Right-handed
- Qualification: 4-y-o +
- Weight: Special Weight
- Purse: ¥ 145,220,000 (as of 2024): 1st: ¥ 67,000,000; 2nd: ¥ 27,000,000; 3rd: ¥ 17,000,000

The Hanshin Daishōten (阪神大賞典, Hanshin Daishōten) is a Japanese Grade 2 flat horse race in Japan for Thoroughbred colts and fillies aged four and over run over a distance of 3,000 metres at the Hanshin Racecourse, Takarazuka, Hyogo. The race was run in late November or early December until 1987 when it was moved to a date in March. The race now serves as a trial for the spring edition of the Tennō Shō.

It was first run in 1953.

== Race details ==
The race is run at Hanshin Racecourse over a distance of 3,000 meters on turf using the inner curve.

=== Weight ===
56 kg for four-year-olds, and 57 kg for five-year-olds and above.
Allowances:

- 2 kg for fillies / mares
- 1 kg for southern hemisphere bred three-year-olds

Penalties (excluding two-year-old race performance):

- If a graded stakes race has been won within a year:
  - 2 kg for a grade 1 win (1 kg for fillies / mares)
  - 1 kg for a grade 2 win
- If a graded stakes race has been won for more than a year:
  - 1 kg for a grade 1 win

== Winners since 1995 ==
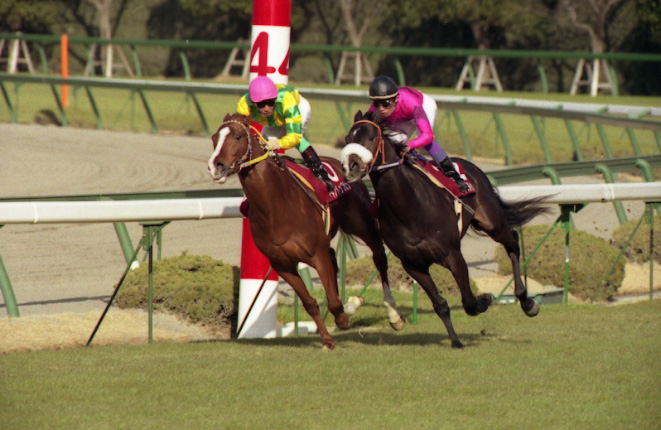
Narita Brian (right) and Mayano Topgun (left) in the 1996 Hanshin Daishoten

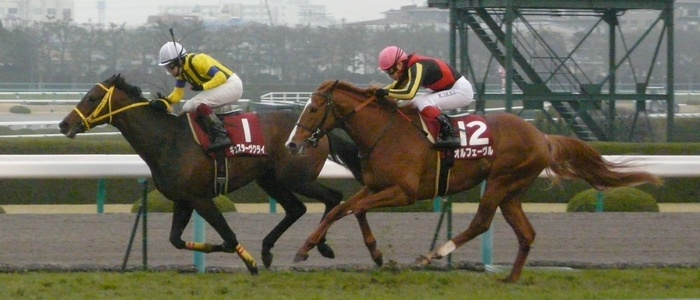
Gustave Cry and Orfevre in the 2012 Hanshin Daishoten

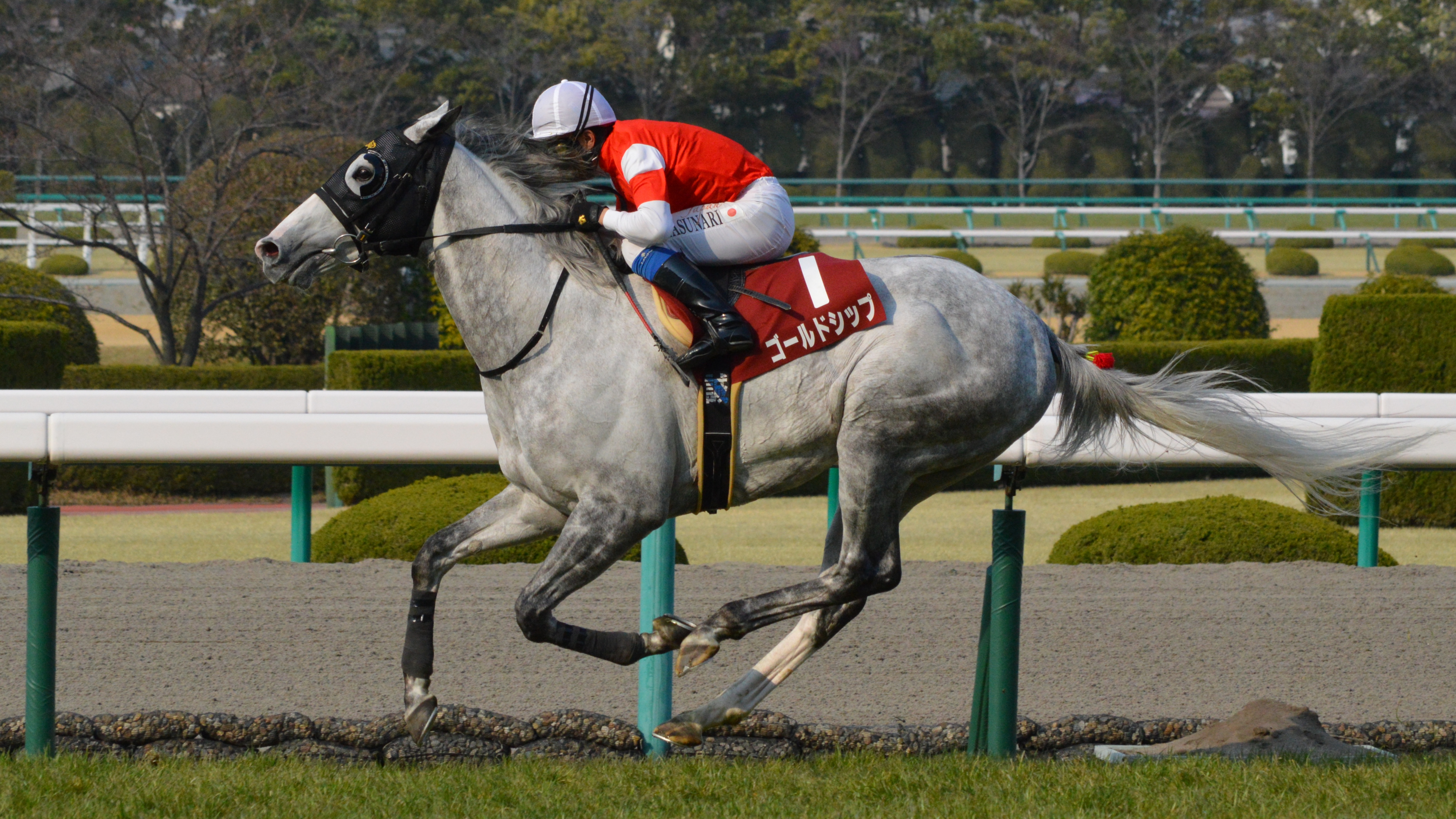
Gold Ship at the 2014 Hanshin Daishoten

Year	Winner	Age	Jockey	Trainer	Owner	Time
1995	Narita Brian	4	Katsuyuki Minai	Masaaki Ookubo	Hidenori Yamaji	3:08.2
1996	Narita Brian	5	Yutaka Take	Masaaki Ookubo	Hidenori Yamaji	3:04.9
1997	Mayano Top Gun	5	Seiki Tabara	Masahiro Sakaguchi	Yu Tadokoro	3:07.2
1998	Mejiro Bright	4	Hiroshi Kawashi	Hidekazu Asami	Mejiro Farm	3:09.3
1999	Special Week	4	Yutaka Take	Toshiaki Shirai	Hiroyoshi Usuda	3:13.4
2000	T M Opera O	4	Ryuji Wada	Ichizo Iwamoto	Masatsugu Takezono	3:09.4
2001	Narita Top Road	5	Kunihiko Watanabe	Hidenori Yamaji	Hidenori Yamaji	3:02.5
2002	Narita Top Road	6	Kunihiko Watanabe	Hidenori Yamaji	Hidenori Yamaji	3:07.9
2003	Daitaku Bertram	5	Yutaka Take	Kojiro Hashiguchi	Taiyo Farm	3:05.9
2004	Lincoln	4	Yutaka Take	Hidetaka Otonashi	Hideko Kondo	3:08.4
2005	My Sole Sound	6	Masaru Honda	Katsuichi Nishiura	Kiyoshi Sano	3:06.2
2006	Deep Impact	4	Yutaka Take	Yasuo Ikee	Kaneko Makoto Holdings	3:08.8
2007	Eye Popper	7	Yutaka Take	Izumi Shimizu	Sunday Racing	3:08.3
2008	Admire Jupiter	5	Yasunari Iwata	Yasuo Tomomichi	Riichi Kondo	3:08.7
2009	Asakusa Kings	5	Hirofumi Shii	Ryuji Okubo	Keiko Tabara	3:13.2
2010	Tokai Trick	8	Shinji Fujita	Kenji Nonaka	Masanori Uchimura	3:07.3
2011	Namura Crescent	6	Ryuji Wada	Nobuharu Fukushima	Nobushige Namura	3:04.4
2012	Gustave Cry	4	Yuichi Fukunaga	Yoshiyuki Arakawa	Shadai Race Horse	3:11.8
2013	Gold Ship	4	Hiroyuki Uchida	Naosuke Sugai	Eiichi Kobayashi	3:05.0
2014	Gold Ship	5	Yasunari Iwata	Naosuke Sugai	Eiichi Kobayashi	3:06.6
2015	Gold Ship	6	Yasunari Iwata	Naosuke Sugai	Eiichi Kobayashi	3:05.9
2016	Cheval Grand	4	Yuichi Fukunaga	Yasuo Tomomichi	Kazuhiro Sasaki	3:05.8
2017	Satono Diamond	4	Christophe Lemaire	Yasutoshi Ikee	Hajime Satomi	3:02.6
2018	Rainbow Line	5	Yasunari Iwata	Hidekazu Asami	Masahiro Mita	3:03.6
2019	Sciacchetra	6	Keita Tosaki	Katsuhiko Sumii	Kaneko Makoto Holdings	3:06.5
2020	You Can Smile	5	Yasunari Iwata	Yasuo Tomomichi	Kaneko Makoto Holdings	3:03.0
2021	Deep Bond	4	Ryuji Wada	Ryuji Okubo	Shinji Maeda	3:07.3
2022	Deep Bond	5	Ryuji Wada	Ryuji Okubo	Shinji Maeda	3:05.0
2023	Justin Palace	4	Christophe Lemaire	Haruki Sugiyama	Masahiro Miki	3:06.1
2024	T O Royal	6	Yuji Hishida	Inao Okada	Tomoya Ozasa	3:06.8
2025	Sunrise Earth	4	Kenichi Ikezoe	Koichi Ishizaka	Life House	3:03.3
2026	Admire Terra	5	Yutaka Take	Yasuo Tomomichi	Junko Kondo	3:02.0

== Earlier winners ==
- 1953 - Koran
- 1954 - Hiya Kiogan
- 1955 - Sekai O
- 1956 - Dainana Hoshu
- 1957 - Top Run
- 1958 - Katsura Shuho
- 1959 - Tokitsuhiro
- 1960 - Yamanin More
- 1961 - Helios
- 1962 - Motoichi
- 1963 - Hikaru Pola
- 1964 - Kotaro
- 1965 - Chitose O
- 1966 - Ryu Pharos
- 1967 - Finis
- 1968 - Muo
- 1969 - Date Hakutaka
- 1970 - Speedy Wonder
- 1971 - Suin Hoshu
- 1972 - Hamano Parade
- 1973 - Dicta Boy
- 1974 - Kuri Onward
- 1975 - Long Hawk
- 1976 - Hokuto Boy
- 1977 - Takino Chester
- 1978 - Captain Namura
- 1979 - Fine Dragon
- 1980 - Great Titan
- 1981 - Arena O
- 1982 - Hanki Inari
- 1983 - Shin Brown
- 1984 - Shin Brown
- 1985 - Nishino Raiden
- 1986 - Mejiro Boir
- 1987 - Suda Hawk
- 1988 - Tamamo Cross and Dyna Carpenter
- 1989 - Namura Mononofu
- 1990 - Osumi Shadai
- 1991 - Mejiro McQueen
- 1992 - Mejiro McQueen
- 1993 - Mejiro Palmer
- 1994 - Monsieur Siecle

== See also ==
- Horse racing in Japan
- List of Japanese flat horse races
