= Tennō Shō (Spring) =

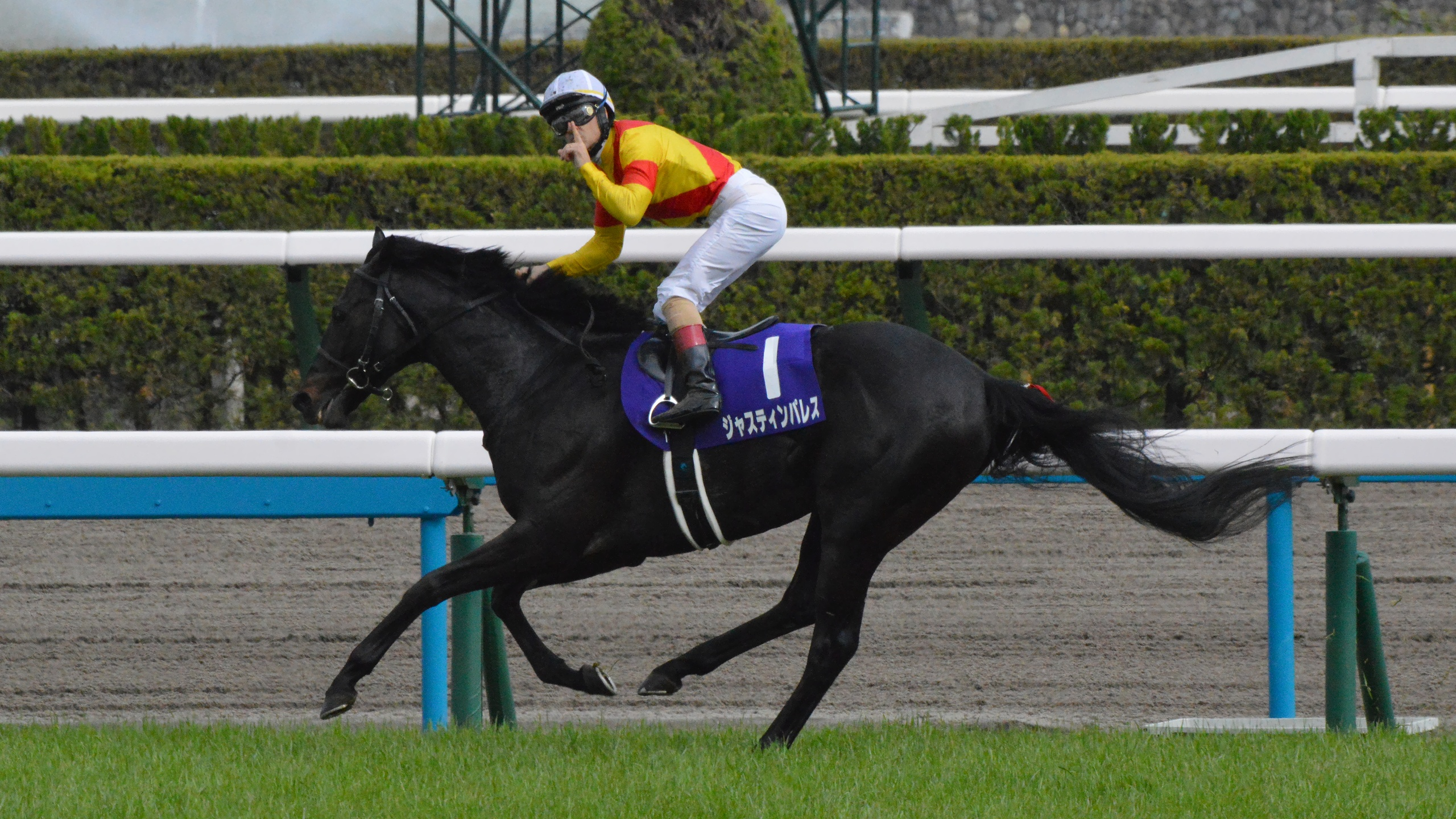
- Justin Palace winning the 167th Tennō Shō
- Class: Int'l Grade 1
- Location: Kyoto Racecourse, Kyoto
- Inaugurated: May 15, 1938
- Race type: Thoroughbred
- Website: japanracing.jp

Race information
- Distance: 3200 meters (About 16 furlongs / 2 miles)
- Surface: Turf
- Track: Right-handed
- Qualification: 4-y-o & Up, Thoroughbreds
- Weight: 58 kg Allowances: 2 kg for fillies and mares
- Purse: ¥ 756,500,000 (as of 2027): 1st: ¥ 350,000,000; 2nd: ¥ 140,000,000; 3rd: ¥ 88,000,000
- Bonuses: Winner of the following in the same year: Ōsaka Hai, Tennō Shō (Spring), Takarazuka Kinen; Domestic: ¥ 300,000,000; International: ¥ 150,000,000; Winner of any three of the following in the same year: Ōsaka Hai, Tennō Shō (Spring/Autumn), Japan Cup, Takarazuka Kinen, Arima Kinen; Domestic: ¥ 200,000,000; International: ¥ 100,000,000

The Tennō Shō (Spring) (天皇賞（春）; lit. 'Emperor Prize (Spring)') is an International Grade I horse race held at Kyoto Racecourse, Japan in late April or early May. It is run over a distance of 3,200 metres (10,500 ft) on turf, and is the longest Grade 1 race in Japan.

The official name of the race is Tennō Shō (天皇賞), but the Japan Racing Association (JRA) describes the race as Tennō Shō (Spring) (天皇賞（春）) since 1984 when the race distance of the Tennō Shō (Autumn) (天皇賞（秋）) was shortened from 3,200 metres to 2,000 metres.

== History ==
=== Early years ===
One of the origin of the Tennō Shō is The Emperor's Cup first contested at Negishi Racecourse in 1905, prized from the Emperor for the winner, and later renamed as Teishitsu Goshōten until 1937. Another origin is Yushō Naikokusanba Rengō Kyōsō run over 3,200 metres, held twice a year between 1911 and 1937 to determine the best horse of the year. The Tennō Shō was established in 1937 to unify these prestigious races under the name of the Emperor, and therefore it is regarded as the most prestigious horse race in Japan since then.

In 1953, Leda has won the race, the only one mare who has won the race in the race history as of 2026.

Prior to 1980, a horse winning a Tennō Shō was not allowed to participate in future editions of the race again, but this ban was lifted in 1981.

=== Recent years ===
In 1984, JRA introduced Group races into their big races, and Tennō Shō was designated as Grade 1 (domestic grade at that time). At the same time the distance of the Tennō Shō (Autumn) held at Tokyo Racecourse was shortened from 3,200 metres to 2,000 metres, though the Tennō Shō (Spring) remained its distance as 3,200 metres, thus the Tennō Shō (Spring) remained its characteristics to determine best stayer, while Tennō Shō (Autumn) changed its characteristics to determine best middle-distance horse.

Prior to 2000, the participants of the Tennō Shō was limited to the horses born and trained in Japan. In 2000, maximum of two foreign-bred horses trained in Japan acquired the rights to participate the race, and then became an international horse race in 2005, maximum of five foreign-trained horses can run the race. Maximum number for international participants were increased to nine in 2007. In 2008, the race also became open to geldings.

Since 2008, the winner of the Melbourne Cup held over a distance of 3,200 metres, same distance as the Tennō Shō (Spring), at the Flemington Racecourse, Melbourne, Australia in previous year is invited to this race, and the winner of the Tennō Shō (Spring) is also given the automatic berths to participate the same year's Melbourne Cup in November.

Since the race became international in 2005, there are three horses participated the race from overseas, including (Australia) Makybe Diva (finished 7th in 2005), (France) Gentoo (finished 9th in 2011) and (United Kingdom) Red Cadeaux twice (finished 3rd in 2013 and 14th in 2014).

Since 2017, bonus has been awarded to horses that win all three races in the same year that make up the Spring Triple Crown for older horses: Osaka Hai, Tenno Sho (Spring) and Takarazuka Kinen.

Since 2025, bonus has also been awarded to horses that win three races in the same year from the six races that make up the Spring Triple Crown described above, and the Autumn Triple Crown for older horses: Tenno Sho (Autumn), Japan Cup, and Arima Kinen.

Deep Impact won the 2006 version of the race setting the world record for a 3,200-metre race with a time of 3:13.4, beating the World Record set in the 1988 Wellington Cup by Daria's Fun, held for almost 20 years of 3:15.59, the closest time run in the Melbourne Cup is 3:16.3. Deep Impact's record stood until Kitasan Black won in 3:12.5 in 2017. The average time for the Tennō Shō from 1990 to 2018 is 3:16.7, while the same for the Melbourne Cup is 3:21.1, a difference of 4.4 seconds.

== Trial races ==
Trial races provide automatic berths to the winning horses.

Race	Grade	Racecourse	Distance	Condition
Hanshin Daishoten	GII	Hanshin	3,000 metres	Winner
Nikkei Sho	GII	Nakayama	2,500 metres	Winner

== Records ==
Speed record:

- 3:12.5 — Kitasan Black (2017/Yutaka Take)

Multiple winners:

- 2 — Mejiro McQueen (1991, 1992)
- 2 — Rice Shower (1993, 1995)
- 2 — T. M. Opera O (2000, 2001)
- 2 — Fenomeno (2013, 2014)
- 2 — Kitasan Black (2016, 2017)
- 2 — Fierement (2019, 2020)

Most wins by jockey:

- 8 — Yutaka Take (1989 / Inari One)(1990 / Super Creek)(1991,1992 / Mejiro McQueen)(1999 / Special Week)(2006 / Deep Impact)(2016,2017 / Kitasan Black)

The youngest winning jockey:

- Yutaka Take (1989 Inari One, 20 Years old 1 Month 15 Days)

The oldest winning jockey

- Yutaka Take (2017 Kitasan Black, 48 Years old 1 Month 16 Days)

== Winners since 1990 ==
Year	Winner	Age	Jockey	Trainer	Owner	Time
1990	Super Creek	5	Yutaka Take	Syuuji Itou	Makoto Kikura	3:21.9
1991	Mejiro McQueen	4	Yutaka Take	Yasuo Ikee	Mejiro Stud	3:18.8
1992	Mejiro McQueen	5	Yutaka Take	Yasuo Ikee	Mejiro Stud	3:20.0
1993	Rice Shower	4	Hitoshi Matoba	Yoshitsugu Iizuka	Hideo Kurabayashi	3:17.1
1994	Biwa Hayahide^{[a]}	4	Yukio Okabe	Mitsumasa Hamada	Biwa Co Ltd	3:22.6
1995	Rice Shower	6	Hitoshi Matoba	Yoshitsugu Iizuka	Hideo Kurabayashi	3:19.9
1996	Sakura Laurel	5	Norihiro Yokoyama	Katsutarou Sakai	Sakura Commerce	3:17.8
1997	Mayano Top Gun	5	Seiki Tabara	Masahiro Sakaguchi	Yuu Tadokoro	3:14.4
1998	Mejiro Bright	4	Hiroshi Kawachi	Hidekazu Asami	Mejiro Stud	3:23.6
1999	Special Week	4	Yutaka Take	Toshiaki Shirai	Hiroyoshi Usuda	3:15.3
2000	T. M. Opera O	4	Ryuji Wada	Ichizo Iwamoto	Masatsugu Takezono	3:17.6
2001	T. M. Opera O	5	Ryuji Wada	Ichizo Iwamoto	Masatsugu Takezono	3:16.2
2002	Manhattan Cafe	4	Masayoshi Ebina	Futoshi Kojima	Ken Nishikawa	3:19.5
2003	Hishi Miracle	4	Koichi Tsunoda	Masaru Sayama	Masaichiro Abe	3:17.0
2004	Ingrandire	5	Norihiro Yokoyama	Yoshinami Shimizu	Chizu Yoshida	3:18.4
2005	Suzuka Mambo	4	Katsumi Ando	Mitsuru Hashida	Keiji Nagai	3:16.5
2006	Deep Impact	4	Yutaka Take	Yasuo Ikee	Makoto Kaneko	3:13.4
2007	Meisho Samson	4	Mamoru Ishibashi	Shigetada Takahashi	Yoshio Matsumoto	3:14.1
2008	Admire Jupiter	5	Yasunari Iwata	Yasuo Tomomichi	Riichi Kondo	3:15.1
2009	Meiner Kitz	6	Masami Matsuoka	Sakae Kunieda	Thoroughbred Club Ruffian	3:14.4
2010	Jaguar Mail	6	Craig Williams	Noriyuki Hori	Kazumi Yoshida	3:15.7
2011	Hiruno d'Amour	4	Shinji Fujita	Mitsugu Kon	Hashimoto Bokujo	3:20.6
2012	Beat Black	5	Syu Ishibashi	Hitoshi Nakamura	Koji Maeda	3:13.8
2013	Fenomeno	4	Masayoshi Ebina	Hirofumi Toda	Sunday Racing	3:14.2
2014	Fenomeno	5	Masayoshi Ebina	Hirofumi Toda	Sunday Racing	3:15.1
2015	Gold Ship	6	Norihiro Yokoyama	Naosuke Sugai	Kobayashi Eiichi Holdings	3:14.7
2016	Kitasan Black	4	Yutaka Take	Hisashi Shimizu	Ono Shoji	3:15.3
2017	Kitasan Black	5	Yutaka Take	Hisashi Shimizu	Ono Shoji	3:12.5
2018	Rainbow Line	5	Yasunari Iwata	Hidekazu Asami	Masahiro Mita	3:16.2
2019	Fierement	4	Christophe Lemaire	Takahisa Tezuka	Sunday Racing	3:15.0
2020	Fierement	5	Christophe Lemaire	Takahisa Tezuka	Sunday Racing	3:16.5
2021	World Premiere^{[b]}	5	Yuichi Fukunaga	Yasuo Tomomichi	Ryoichi Otsuka	3:14.7
2022	Titleholder^{[b]}	4	Kazuo Yokoyama	Toru Kurita	Hiroshi Yamada	3:16.2
2023	Justin Palace	4	Christophe Lemaire	Haruki Sugiyama	Masahiro Miki	3:16.1
2024	T O Royal	6	Yuji Hishida	Inao Okada	Tomoya Ozasa	3:14.2
2025	Redentor	4	Damian Lane	Tetsuya Kimura	U Carrot Farm	3:14.0
2026	Croix du Nord	4	Yuichi Kitamura	Takashi Saito	Sunday Racing	3:13.7

^{a} The 1994 race was contested at Hanshin Racecourse.
^{b} The 2021 and 2022 races were contested at Hanshin Racecourse, due to construction at Kyoto Racecourse.

== Earlier winners ==
- 1938 - Hase Park
- 1939 - Sugenuma
- 1940 - Toki no Chikara
- 1941 - Marutake
- 1942 - Minami Mor
- 1943 - Grand Lite
- 1944 - Hiro Sakura
- 1945 - No race
- 1946 - No race
- 1947 - Olite
- 1948 - Cyma
- 1949 - Miharu O
- 1950 - Owens
- 1951 - Takakura Yama
- 1952 - Mitsuhata
- 1953 - Leda
- 1954 - Hakuryou
- 1955 - Taka O
- 1956 - Meiji Hikari
- 1957 - Kitano O
- 1958 - Onward There
- 1959 - Tosa O
- 1960 - Kuripero
- 1961 - Yamanin More
- 1962 - Onslaught
- 1963 - Korehisa
- 1964 - Hikaru Pola
- 1965 - Asahoko
- 1966 - Hakuzuikou
- 1967 - Speed Symboli
- 1968 - Hikarutakai
- 1969 - Takeshiba O
- 1970 - Riki Eikan
- 1971 - Mejiro Musashi
- 1972 - Bell Wide
- 1973 - Tai Tehm
- 1974 - Take Hope
- 1975 - Ichifuji Isami
- 1976 - Erimo George
- 1977 - Ten Point
- 1978 - Green Grass
- 1979 - Kashuu Chikara
- 1980 - Nichidou Taro
- 1981 - Katsurano Haiseiko
- 1982 - Monte Prince
- 1983 – Amber Shadai
- 1984 – Monte Fast
- 1985 - Symboli Rudolf
- 1986 - Kushiro King
- 1987 - Miho Shinzan
- 1988 - Tamamo Cross
- 1989 - Inari One

== See also ==
- Tennō Shō
- Tennō Shō (Autumn)
- Horse racing in Japan
- List of Japanese flat horse races
