= Haruki Sugiyama =

Japanese racehorse trainer (born 1981)

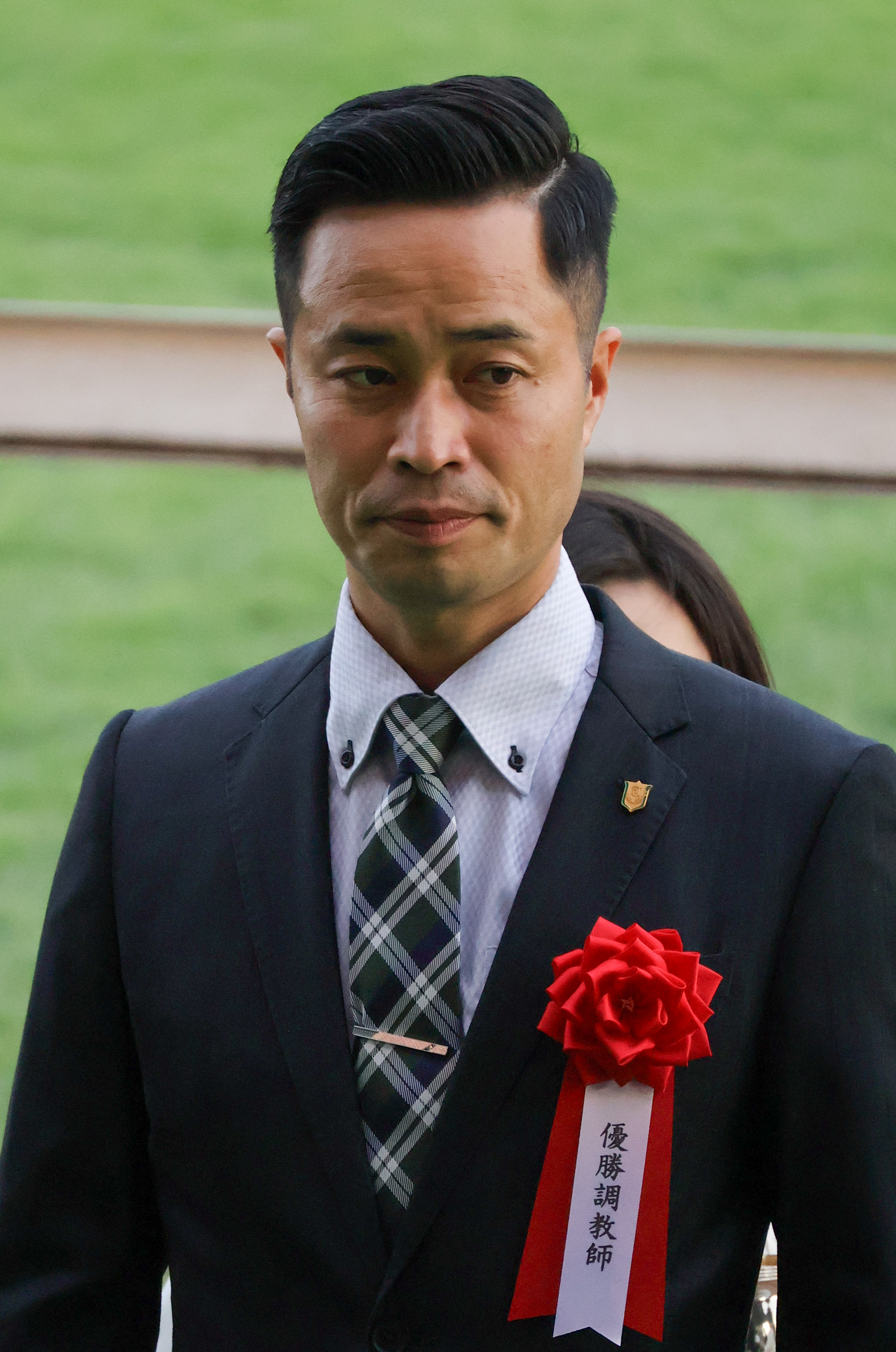
- Sugiyama in 2025 (Fuji Stakes victory ceremony)

Personal information
- Native name: 杉山晴紀
- Born: December 24, 1981 (age 44) Fujisawa, Kanagawa, Japan

Horse racing career
- Sport: Horse racing

Significant horses
- K T Brave, Daring Tact, Justin Palace, Gaia Force, Lugal, Lovcen

Haruki Sugiyama (杉山晴紀) is Japanese racehorse trainer.

== History ==
He is the seventh trainer in the past 10 years to win two JRA graded races in one day.

== Major wins ==
- Hopeful Stakes - Lovcen (2025)
- Japan Breeding Farms' Cup Classic - K T Brave (2018)
- Oka Sho - Daring Tact (2020)
- Satsuki Sho - Lovcen (2026)
- Shūka Sho - Daring Tact (2020)
- Sprinters Stakes - Lugal (2024)
- Tennō Shō (Spring) - Justin Palace (2023)
- Tōkyō Yūshun - Lovcen (2026)
- Yushun Himba - Daring Tact (2020)
