= Stellenbosch (horse) =

Japanese racehorse

Stellenbosch ステレンボッシュ
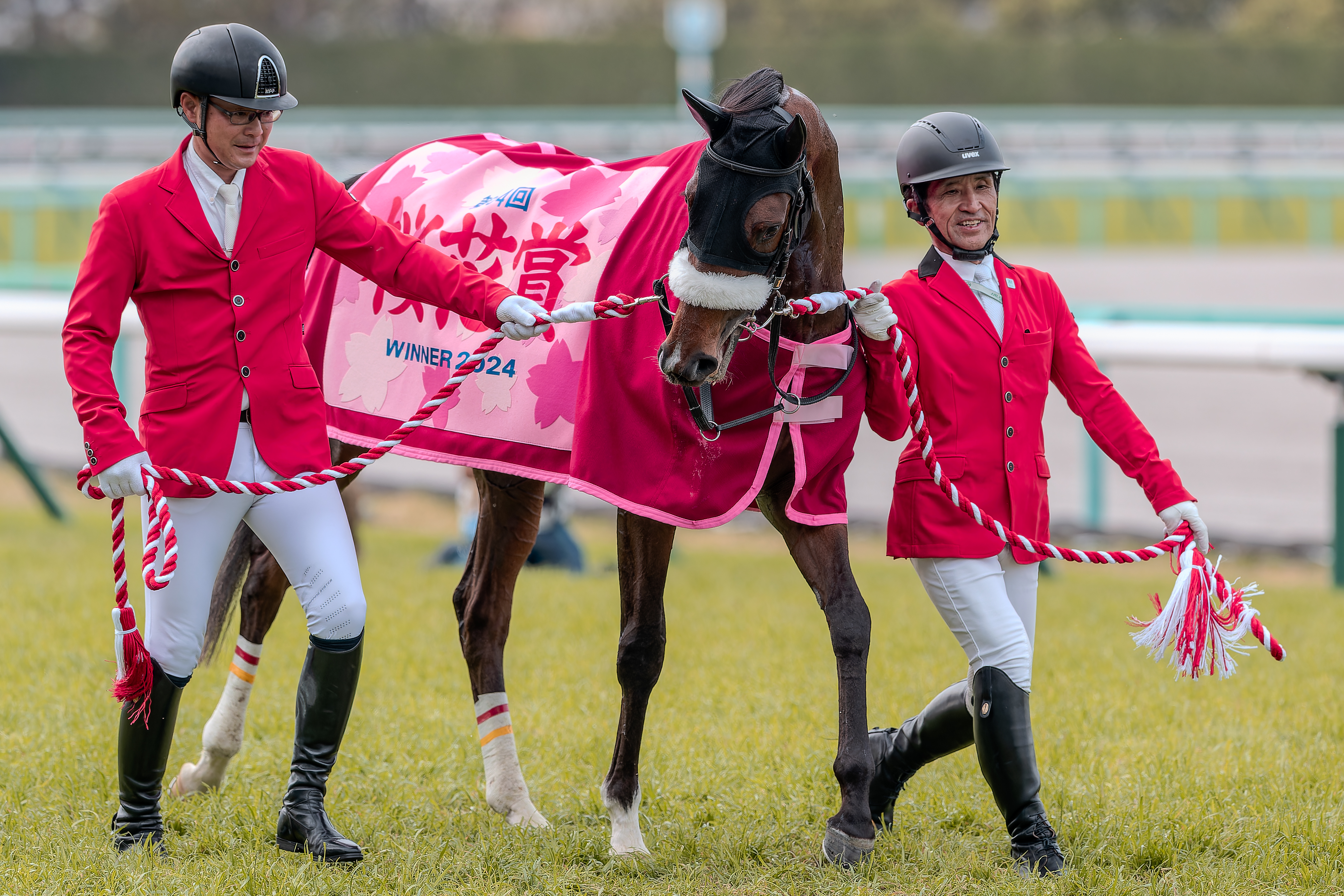
- Stellenbosch after winning the 2024 Oka Sho.
- Breed: Thoroughbred
- Sire: Epiphaneia
- Grandsire: Symboli Kris S
- Dam: Bloukrans
- Damsire: Rulership
- Sex: Filly
- Foaled: February 12, 2021 (age 5)
- Country: Japan
- Color: Bay
- Breeder: Northern Farm
- Owner: Katsumi Yoshida
- Racing colours
- Trainer: Sakae Kunieda →Keisuke Miyata
- Jockey: Joao Moreira
- Record: 17: 3-4-2
- Earnings: ¥378,904,600 (Note: Earnings earned overseas are converted to JPY using the formula provided by JRA.); JPN: 328,940,000 JPY; HK: 2,760,000 HKD

Major wins
- Japanese Classic Tiara Race wins: Oka Sho (2024)

Stellenbosch (Japanese: ステレンボッシュ, foaled February 12, 2021) is a retired Japanese Thoroughbred racehorse and active broodmare. She won the Oka Sho in 2024.

She was named after Stellenbosch, a town in Western Cape, South Africa.

== Racing career ==
=== Before debut ===
Stellenbosch was born at Northern Farm, located in Abira, Hokkaido. She is currently owned by Shadai Group Owners for about 5 million yen per share, with Katsumi Yoshida as their representative. She was sent into training with Sakae Kunieda.

=== 2023: two-year-old season ===
Stellenbosch debuted at the Sapporo Racecourse on July 23, 2023, in an 1,800-meter, two-year-old newcomer race on turf, ridden by Takeshi Yokoyama. Although she was the second-favored horse, she won brilliantly by one and a half horse length. Ten weeks later, she raced in a 1-win class race, Saffron Sho. She settled in from behind and then moved up in the final straight but lost by a nose to Spring Nova. Seven weeks later, she raced in another 1-win class race, Akamatsu Sho, with Tom Marquand on her saddle. She settled in midfield this time, and in the final straight, she overtook Teleos Sarah to win by three-quarters of a horse length.

For the last race of her two-year-old season, she was signed up for the Hanshin Juvenile Fillies held at Hanshin Racecourse on December 10. This was her first graded stakes race, the first being a grade one. She was favored 5th in the race with Christophe Lemaire on her saddle. Settling in midfield from the start, she traveled well into the final straight but lost by a neck to Ascoli Piceno, finishing second.

=== 2024: three-year-old season ===
Stellenbosch entered straight into the Oka Sho, the first leg of the Japanese Fillies' Triple Crown. With João Moreira on her saddle, she was the second most favored horse to win the race. She settled in midfield from the start, and in the final straight, she moved out ahead of Ascoli Piceno, winning the race by three-quarters of a horse length. One month later at the Yushun Himba, Keita Tosaki, who took the rein controlled the horse well at the start. He positioned the horse to stay majorly on ninth position. She did get stuck in some traffic, but once the gap was open, she displayed her good turn of foot to take command 300 metres from the line. Unfortunately, the on-rushing Cervinia overtook her in the final 100 metres as she finished in second place on the line. It was decided that she would close the first half in this race and go straight to Shuka Sho in autumn without another prep race.

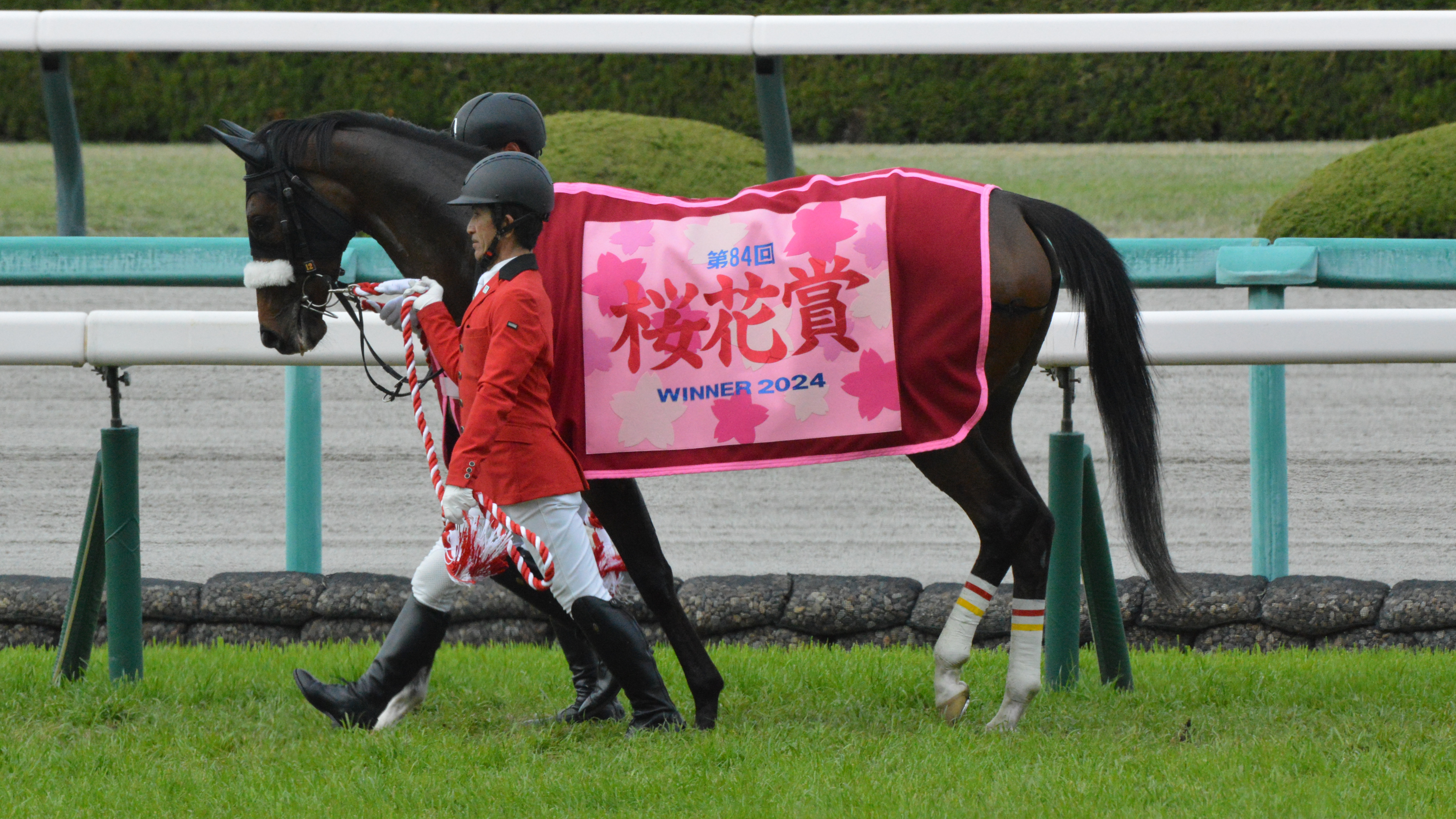
Stellenbosch after winning the 2024 Oka Sho

As the Shuka Sho began, the horse struck a late start from the gate as she traveled along in tenth position. Tosaki then angled her out on the final corner before turning on the jets towards the inside track for the finishing kick. She was improving at a steady rate and got into second place initially before being pinned down by Bond Girl and dropped to third place. At the year-end, Stellenbosch would finish the year with an overseas race, the Hong Kong Vase at Sha Tin Racecourse. Her Oka Sho jockey, Moreira, returned, and she was drawn to start the race from the outside gate. During the race, she was pushed and blocked at the back early on. Reaching the final corner, she made a sudden move from the outside and briefly took the lead in the final straight. In the last furlong, she gassed out and dropped to third place whilst she crossed the line. Three days after the race, she returned, underwent quarantine, and prepared for the next season, per Kunieda.

=== 2025: four-year-old season ===
She faced a tough season this year as she did not start well in the Osaka Hai in April. She failed to secure a good position in the early phase. Near the end, she did not give a good response and fell back to finish in 13th place. She was planned to race in Hong Kong again but pivoted towards the Victoria Mile at Tokyo in May instead. When the race started, Tosaki, who returned as her jockey, could not get a proper start as she ran in the eighth position for the majority of the race. She never improved despite being in a good position at the inside rail, and stayed eighth on the line.

She was rested for three months before resuming her season at the Sapporo Kinen in August. This time she would have a new jockey which was Kenichi Ikezoe. Her bad form continued as she finished in 15th place. Ikezoe said after the race that she was physically good and the preparation was tight. It was just that her mental game was not up to the competition. She finished her season at the Queen Elizabeth II Cup in Kyoto Racecourse. Lemaire, who's returning as her jockey after two seasons, calmly propelled her into the middle pack as the gates opened. Reaching the final corner, she lost a bit of balance, which delayed her pace a bit. In the final straight, she lacked the needed kick to move up the order and ended up in tenth place behind the winner, Regaleira.

=== 2026: five-year-old season ===
In February, due to the retirement of Kunieda, she was transferred into the care of Keisuke Miyata of Miho Training Center. Her first race of the season was not going well as she finished in seventh place at the Nakayama Himba Stakes. Lemaire spoke after the race, "I couldn't get a good position at the start . She stretched out nicely in the straight, but her position was too far back, and she couldn't catch the horses in front.", mentioning her persistent problems of being unable to give responses from the back. On May, she participated in the Epsom Cup, a 1800 metres race in Tokyo. The team believed that the signs of comeback was there in her previous performance. As the gates opened, she made a good start and stayed steady in the middle pack as the race went on. Stellenbosch made a strong run in the straight but was beaten by the winner, Trovatore, by a nose just before the finish line. Tosaki who rode him was overjoyed that she performed well and thought she did made a comeback with that run. Miyata who was positive for her development decided to register her in the Yasuda Kinen next with another jockey, Damian Lane. In the race, Stellenbosch ran well around seventh position, but she was blocked on the inside, failed to respond, and dropped to tenth on the line.

In July, it was announced by Miyata that Stellenbosch would run in the Niigata Kinen in August. As it turned out, the race would get a tough field, as several GI-winning horses such as Durezza, Urban Chic, Cervinia and Rodeo Drive also joined in. When the day came, it was a heavy track they had to run on. Despite this condition, Tosaki, who took the task, started well with the horse and seemed poised to take the lead, but settled into ninth place out of eleven. She chose to go wide in the final straight. She seemed to be accelerating, but her momentum faltered when she joined the inner course, and she sank to last place. Tosaki claimed that the horse did not respond to his command in the end and wondered how her mood was during the crucial moments. This repeating condition sparked questions about her mental game once again. In November, she raced in the Queen Elizabeth II Cup for the second time alongside Ikezoe once again, who trusted the stable's preparation and did not ride her at all before the race. This approach turned out bad for the horse as she did not made a good impression, never possessed a threat on the day and finished in lowly 17th place, the second to last position. After the race, Ikezoe pointed out that the horse got caught up on the bad track conditions and although it got better as the race went on, she never able to get the speed with the atrocious track conditions. She was being retired from racing right after this race and her registration would be terminated on 19th of November.

== Racing statistics ==
The data is based on data available on JBIS Search, and NetKeiba.

Date	Track	Race	Grade	Distance (Condition)	Entry	HN	Odds (Favored)	Finish	Time	Margins	Jockey	Winner (Runner-up)
2023 – two-year-old season
Jul 23	Sapporo	2yo Newcomer		1,800 m (Firm)	6	5	3.9 (2)	1st	1:51.1	-0.3	Takeshi Yokoyama	(Fire Line)
Oct 1	Nakayama	Saffron Sho	1 win	1,600 m (Firm)	7	5	2.4 (1)	2nd	1:35.8	0.0	Takeshi Yokoyama	Spring Nova
Nov 19	Tokyo	Akamatsu Sho	1 win	1,600 m (Firm)	9	6	2.9 (1)	1st	1:33.8	0.0	Tom Marquand	(Teleos Sarah)
Dec 10	Hanshin	Hanshin JF	1	1,600 m (Firm)	18	6	8.7 (5)	2nd	1:32.6	0.1	Christophe Lemaire	Ascoli Piceno
2024 – three-year-old season
Apr 7	Hanshin	Oka Sho	1	1,600 m (Firm)	18	12	4.3 (2)	1st	1:32.2	-0.1	João Moreira	(Ascoli Piceno)
May 19	Tokyo	Yushun Himba	1	2,400 m (Firm)	18	7	2.3 (1)	2nd	2:24.1	0.1	Keita Tosaki	Cervinia
Oct 13	Kyoto	Shūka Sho	1	2,000 m (Firm)	18	14	3.9 (2)	3rd	1:57.5	0.4	Keita Tosaki	Cervinia
Dec 8	Sha Tin	Hong Kong Vase	1	2,400 m (Good)	13	13	3.2 (1)	3rd	2:28.07	0.54	João Moreira	Giavellotto
2025 – four-year-old season
Apr 6	Hanshin	Ōsaka Hai	1	2,000 m (Firm)	15	12	5.2 (3)	13th	1:57.3	1.1	João Moreira	Bellagio Opera
May 18	Tokyo	Victoria Mile	1	1,600 m (Firm)	18	2	8.0 (3)	8th	1:32.4	0.3	Keita Tosaki	Ascoli Piceno
Aug 17	Sapporo	Sapporo Kinen	2	2,000 m (Good)	16	8	5.5 (3)	15th	2:03.4	1.9	Kenichi Ikezoe	Top Knife
Nov 16	Kyoto	Queen Elizabeth II Cup	1	2,200 m (Firm)	16	2	13.2 (6)	10th	2:12.0	1.0	Christophe Lemaire	Regaleira
2026 – five-year-old season
Mar 7	Nakayama	Nakayama Himba Stakes	3	1,800 m (Good)	16	9	23.4 (9)	7th	1:47.7	0.6	Christophe Lemaire	Ethelfleda
May 5	Tokyo	Epsom Cup	3	1,800 m (Firm)	17	16	17.0 (5)	2nd	1:45.3	0.0	Keita Tosaki	Trovatore
Jun 7	Tokyo	Yasuda Kinen	1	1,600 m (Firm)	17	6	17.0 (5)	10th	1:32.9	0.8	Damian Lane	Sixpence
Aug 30	Niigata	Niigata Kinen	3	2,000 m (Good)	11	11	13.3 (5)	11th	2:00.7	1.1	Keita Tosaki	Zoroastro
Nov 15	Kyoto	Queen Elizabeth II Cup	1	2,200 m (Soft)	18	3	115.2 (18)	17th	2:16.6	1.9	Kenichi Ikezoe	Laughterlines

Legend:
Turf

== Pedigree ==
Pedigree of Stellenbosch (JPN), bay filly, 2021
Sire Epiphaneia b. 2010	Symboli Kris S (USA) dk. b. 1999	Kris S.	Roberto
Sire Epiphaneia b. 2010	Symboli Kris S (USA) dk. b. 1999	Kris S.	Sharp Queen
Sire Epiphaneia b. 2010	Symboli Kris S (USA) dk. b. 1999	Tee Key	Gold Meridian
Sire Epiphaneia b. 2010	Symboli Kris S (USA) dk. b. 1999	Tee Key	Tri Argo
Sire Epiphaneia b. 2010	Cesario blk. 2002	Special Week	Sunday Silence (USA)
Sire Epiphaneia b. 2010	Cesario blk. 2002	Special Week	Campaign Girl
Sire Epiphaneia b. 2010	Cesario blk. 2002	Kirov Premiere (GB)	Sadler's Wells (USA)
Sire Epiphaneia b. 2010	Cesario blk. 2002	Kirov Premiere (GB)	Querida (IRE)
Dam Bloukrans b. 2014	Rulership b. 2007	King Kamehameha	Kingmambo (USA)
Dam Bloukrans b. 2014	Rulership b. 2007	King Kamehameha	Manfath (IRE)
Dam Bloukrans b. 2014	Rulership b. 2007	Air Groove	Tony Bin (IRE)
Dam Bloukrans b. 2014	Rulership b. 2007	Air Groove	Dyna Carle
Dam Bloukrans b. 2014	Land's Edge b. 2006	Dance in the Dark	Sunday Silence (USA)
Dam Bloukrans b. 2014	Land's Edge b. 2006	Dance in the Dark	Dancing Key (USA)
Dam Bloukrans b. 2014	Land's Edge b. 2006	Wind in Her Hair (IRE)	Alzao (USA)
Dam Bloukrans b. 2014	Land's Edge b. 2006	Wind in Her Hair (IRE)	Burghclere (GB) (Family: 2-f)

- She is related to 2023 Hopeful Stakes winner, Regaleira, through Land's Edge.
- Land's Edge's half brother is Deep Impact and Black Tide.
