= Cervinia (horse) =

Japanese racehorse

Cervinia チェルヴィニア
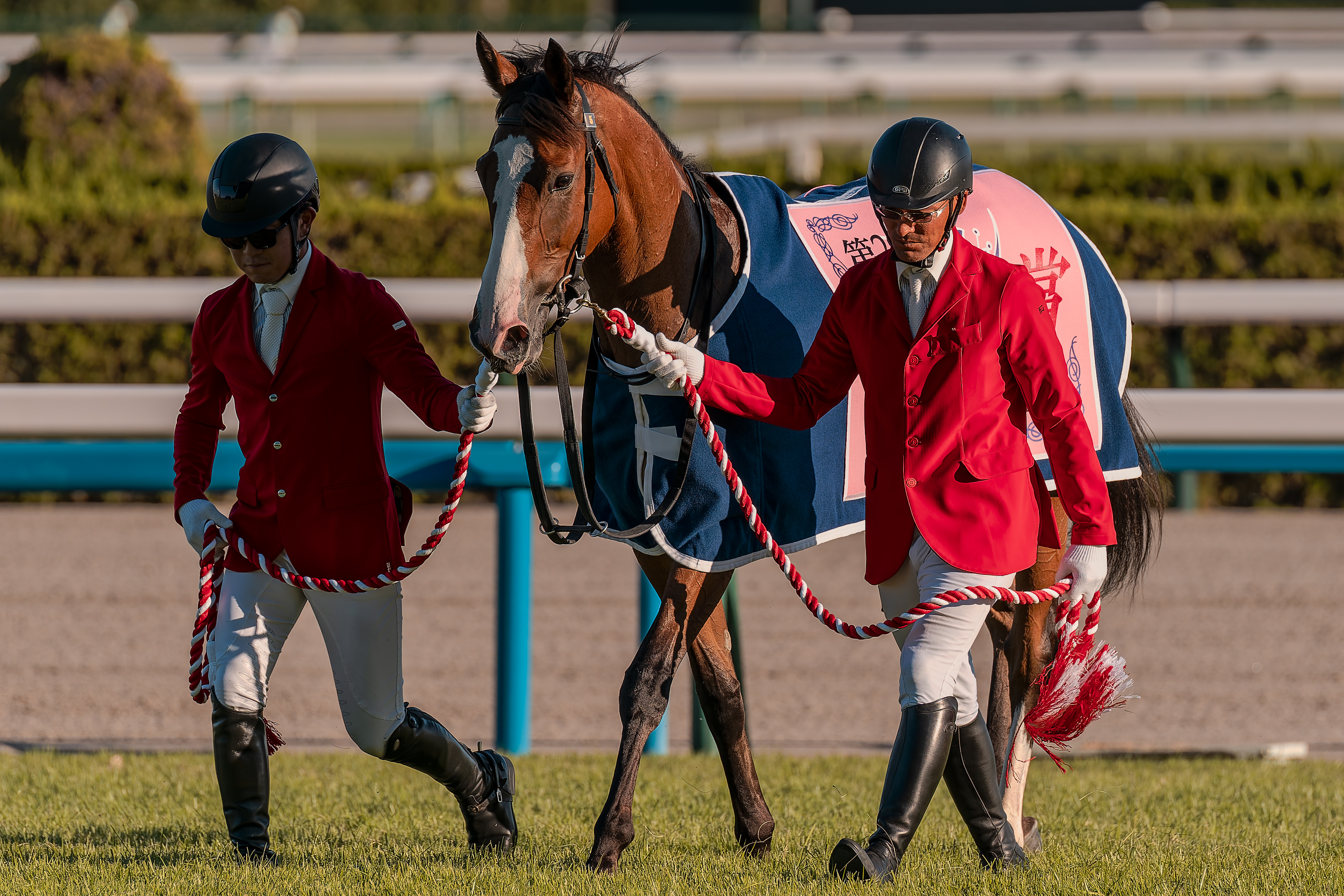
- 2024 Shuka Sho
- Sire: Harbinger
- Grandsire: Dansili
- Dam: Cecchino
- Damsire: King Kamehameha
- Sex: Filly
- Foaled: February 3, 2021 (age 5)
- Country: Japan
- Color: Bay
- Breeder: Northern Farm
- Owner: Sunday Racing Co. Ltd.
- Racing colours
- Trainer: Tetsuya Kimura
- Jockey: Christophe Lemaire
- Record: 16: 4-2-0
- Earnings: ¥445,108,900 (Note: Earnings earned overseas are converted to JPY using the formula provided by JRA.); JPN: 426,266,000 JPY; UAE: 120,000 USD

Major wins
- Artemis Stakes (2023); Japanese Classic Tiara Race wins: Yushun Himba (2024); Shuka Sho (2024)

Awards
- JRA Award for Best Three-Year-Old Filly (2024)
- Last updated on August 30, 2026

Cervinia (Japanese: チェルヴィニア, Hepburn: Cheruvinia; foaled February 3, 2021) is a retired Japanese Thoroughbred racehorse. She won the Shūka Sho and the Yushun Himba in 2024. She was voted to receive the JRA Award for Best Three-Year-Old Filly in the same year.

She was named after Breuil-Cervinia, a town at the foot of mount Matterhorn.

== Racing career ==
=== 2023: two-year-old season ===
Cervinia debuted at the Tokyo Racecourse on June 4, 2023, in a two-year-old newcomer race on turf at a distance of 1,600 meters. After a good start, she took the lead in the final straight but was caught by Bond Girl at the end, finishing second. Two months later, she returned in a maiden race at Niigata Racecourse at a distance of 1,800 meters. She settled in second place early on and broke away in the final straight, winning the race by six lengths.

On October 28, she ran in the Artemis Stakes, her first graded stakes race challenge. She settled in a good position up front. Turning into the final straight, she burst forward to take the lead and win the race by one and three-quarter lengths ahead of Safira.

She was scheduled to run in the Hanshin Juvenile Fillies but was forced to cancel her registration due to lameness in her left hind leg.

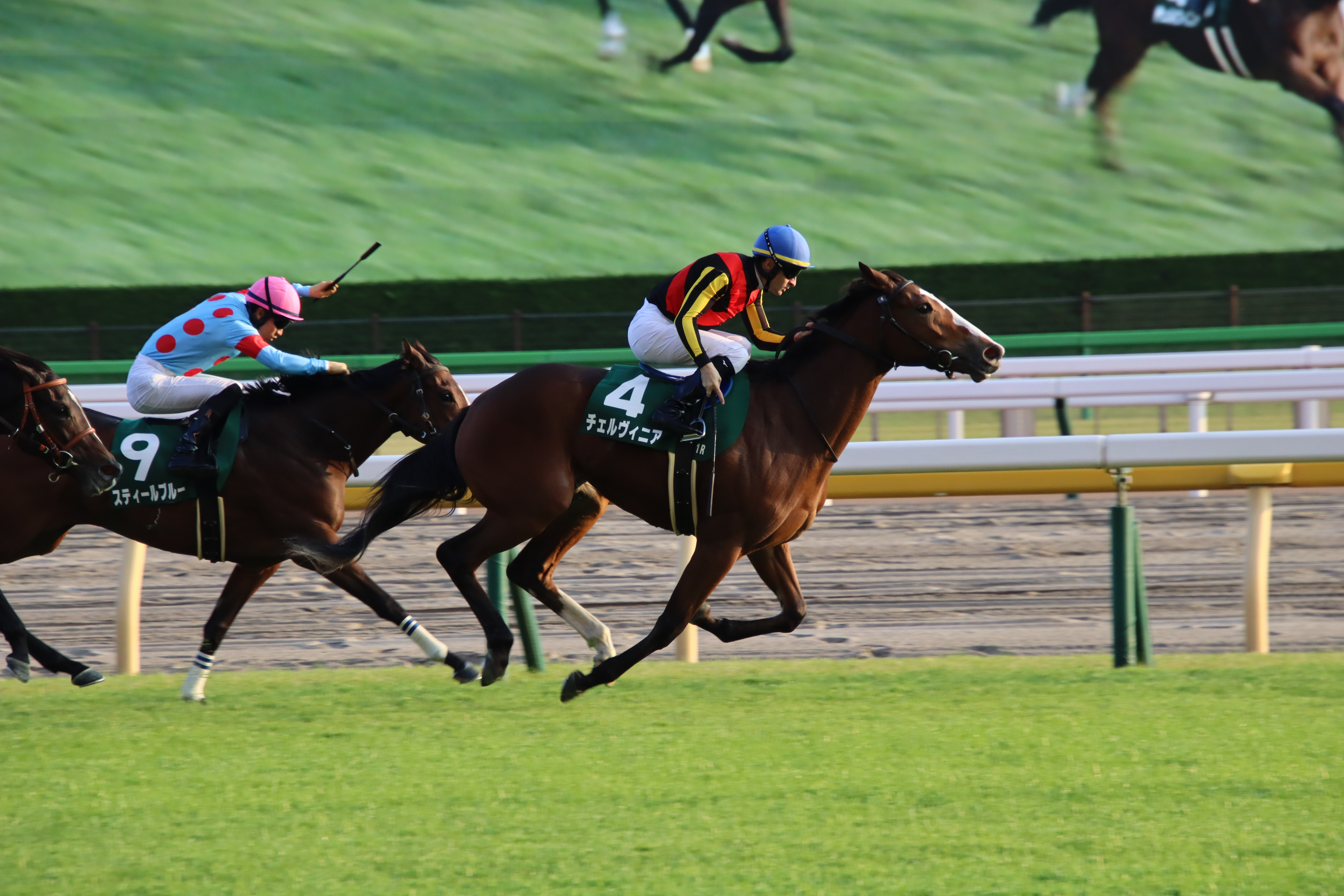
Cervinia winning the Artemis Stakes

=== 2024: three-year-old season ===
On January 28, 2024, it was announced that Cervinia would go straight to Oka Sho (Japanese 1000 Guineas) without running a prep race, with Bauyrzhan Murzabayev on her saddle, replacing Christophe Lemaire after the latter fell off from his horse at the Dubai World Cup Night on March 30. On April 7, she ran in the Oka Sho as scheduled. She was the fourth-favored horse to win the race. Settling near the front, she made her way in the final straight but was never in contention to win. She ended up finishing in thirteenth place.

She was scheduled to run in Yushun Himba (Japanese Oaks) on May 19, with Christophe Lemaire returning to ride her. She was the second-favored horse to win the race, behind the Oka Sho winner, Stellenbosch. She settled near the back of the midfield throughout the early and middle parts of the race. On the final straight, she moved from the outside while pushing forward and overtaking several horses. She won the race by half a length after passing over Stellenbosch with less than 50 meters from the finish line, achieving her first grade one win. Her dam, Cecchino, finished second in the same race back in 2016.

She was rested and would resume her season straight to the Shuka Sho in October without any prep race. Sticking with Lemaire on the day, she was the most favoured horse for the race with 2.9 odds to 1. When the gates opened, Lemaire rode her in the middle of the pack as the race went on. The pace started to increase as they reached the third corner due to the gap opened by the front-running Sekitoba East. Turning into home, she had a feisty duel with several other horses, including Stellenbosch, before making a move 200 metres from the line and stretching away. She won the race by one and three-quarters lengths over Bond Girl. Lemaire, who's won his third Shuka Sho after Deirdre in 2017 and Almond Eye in 2018, said that the race went smoothly as planned and was glad that she responded beautifully when it mattered.

She finished her season with a run at the Japan Cup in November. Few weeks before the day, it was confirmed that Lemaire would stay as her jockey. Her training went well as assistant trainer, Ota, praised her physical condition and shape. From the start, Cervinia settled herself and chased the pack slowly in the midfield. She was in contention for the win until the final 400 metres when the three of Do Deuce, Shin Emperor and Durezza pulled away and had a battle for the win. Cervinia maintained her fourth position and finished there by two and a half lengths behind. Lemaire said in the post-race about how the slow pace affected her rhythm and made her unable to tap more speed than intended in the final chase. She was not participating in the Arima Kinen due to the team's decision, as they thought she would be better prepared for the next year's campaign. Surprisingly, Cervinia won the best three-year-old filly from JRA with 190 votes over Regaleira who won the 2024 Arima Kinen, who racked 66 votes from the poll. Kimura believed that "she showed a performance worthy of this award."

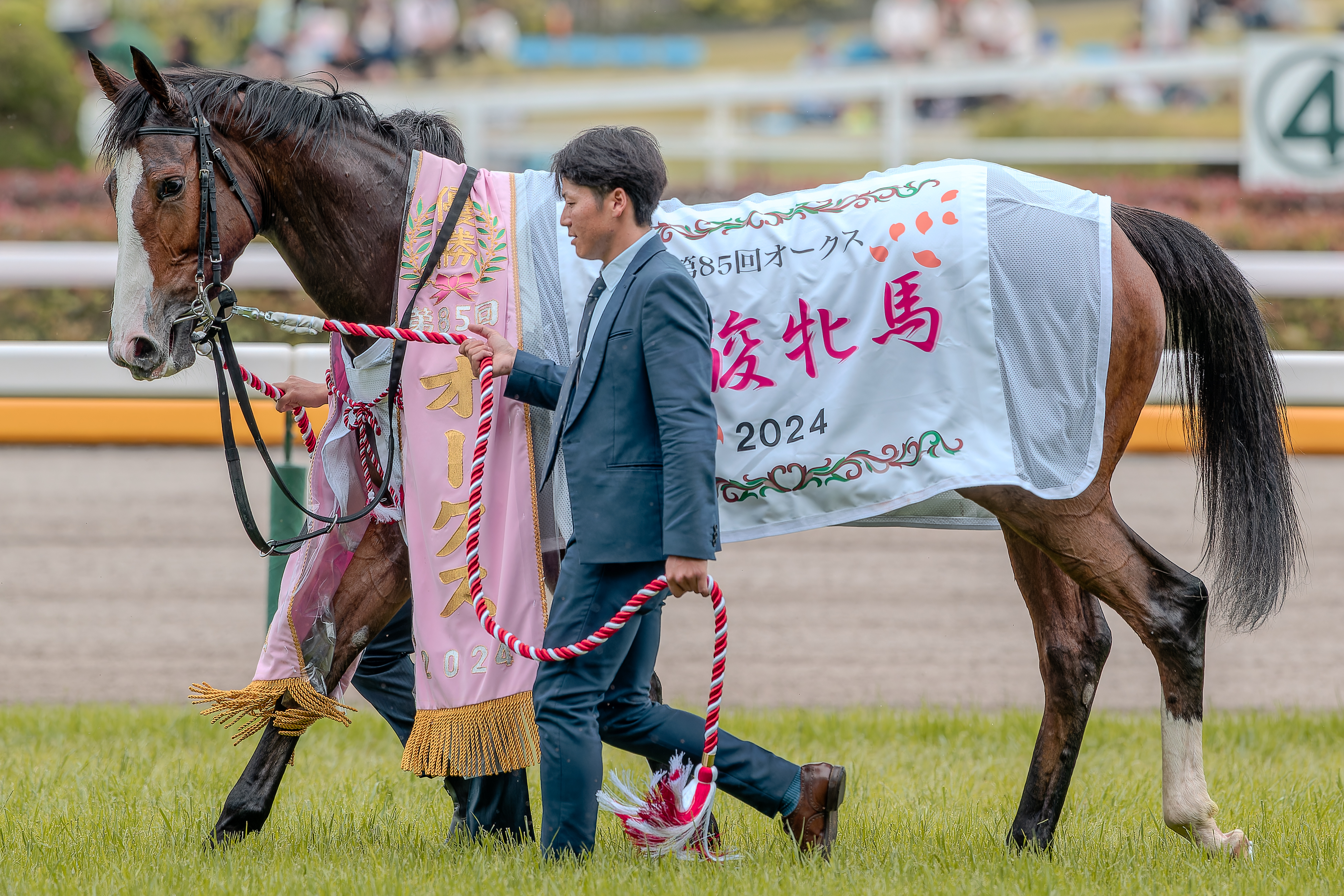
Cervinia after winning the Yushun Himba

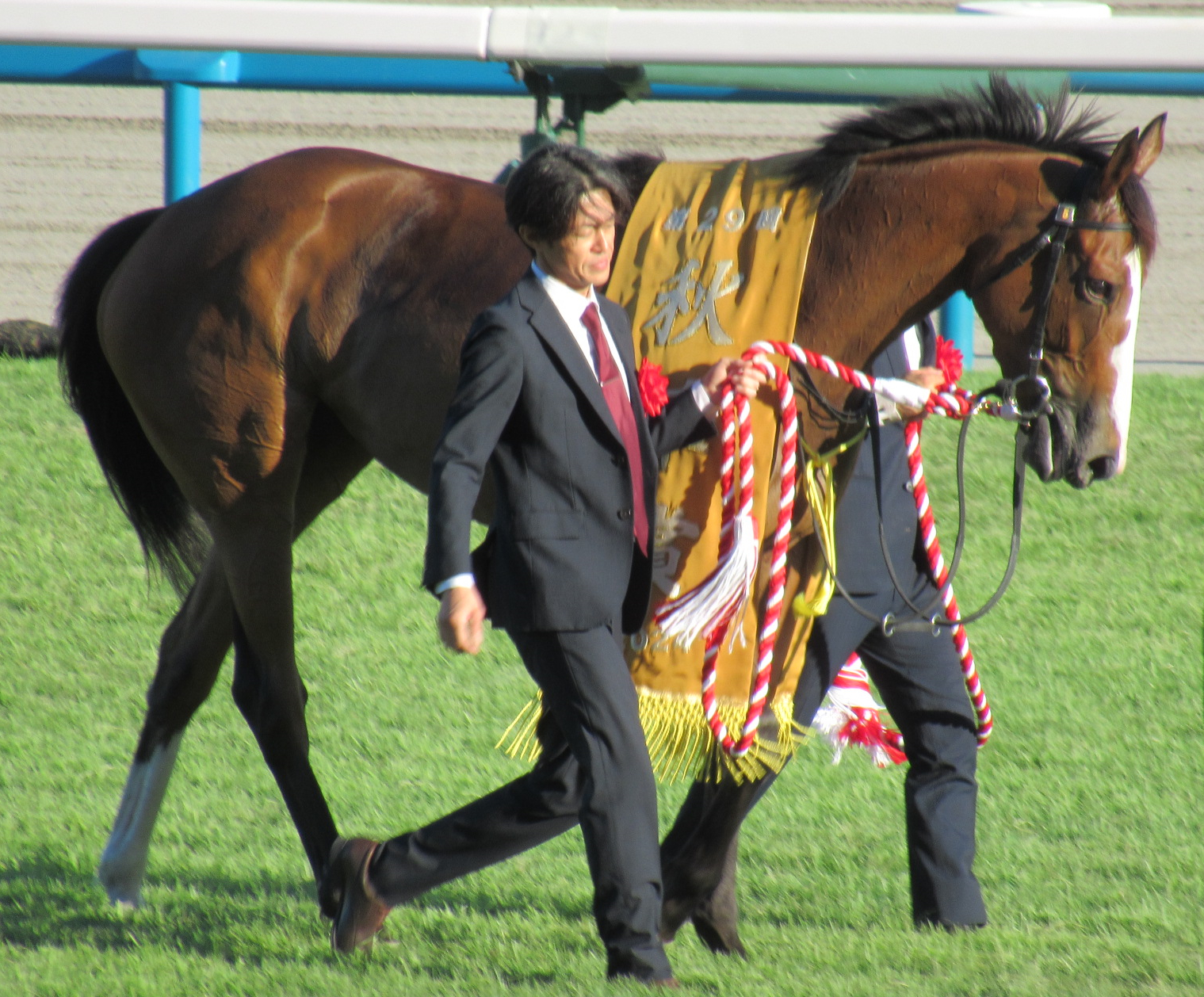
Cervinia after winning the Shuka Sho

=== 2025: four-year-old season ===
Sunday Racing announced in January that she would start her season at the Kyoto Kinen in February. Kimura proposed that this race should be a preparation for her to race in the Dubai Sheema Classic. She started well from the gate but lost momentum in the crucial phase and sank behind the pack to finish in ninth place. Lemaire addressed her bigger build for this race and hopes she has a better race next time. Despite her poor finish, the team stuck to the plan, and she would be racing in the Dubai Sheema Classic in March. She was assigned to start from gate 8. Speaking about the draw, Kimura said that Cervinia was never a horse that affected by gate draw and hoped she would handle it well. She started well in the middle at her usual racing pace, but she was gassed at the final furlong, and unable to extend more in the final straight, as she finished in sixth place in a race that belonged to the Japanese contingent, as Danon Decile won it. Both Lemaire's and Kimura's feedback on the race focusing on her inability to stretched out her strides in the final phase despite having a good preparation leading to it.

She returned home and back to racing three months later in June at the Shirasagi Stakes, her first mile race since the Oka Sho. On the days leading up to the race, Kimura said her training was going well, and she seemed to be getting back on track in terms of performance. The race turned out well for her as she competed well in position. Approaching the finish line, she lost the duel with Lebensstil and came home in second place one length behind. Lemaire spoke about the slow pace once again, but he acknowledged that Cervinia's run was smooth in that race. She did not race until October, when she ran in the Mainichi Okan. Keita Tosaki took the saddle this time as Lemaire would be riding in France. Even with a new jockey, she was still unable to extend more in the final stint, finishing in seventh place. Tosaki noticed this when he urged her to accelerate, but she never did. One month later, she would closed out her season with a run at the Mile Championship alongside another jockey, Tom Marquand. The performance stayed the same as she ran in the tenth position for the majority of the race and never improved until the finish. After this race, Kimura admitted there might be some problems with the training leading up to the recent poor performance of her. She rested for the rest of the year as preparation for either the Tokyo Shimbun Hai or Nakayama Kinen as the next year's season opener.

=== 2026: five-year-old season ===
When the new campaign unfolded, Cervinia was going to start her season at the Nakayama Kinen in February with her normal jockey, Lemaire. She was voted to start from the middle stall this time which was the gate 6. As the race turned out, the pack moved out slowly from the gate when it started. Despite that, Cervinia managed to keep up some speed and secured a fifth-place finish on the line. Lemaire said she was unlucky not getting into the right position quicker but praised that she still got some speed at the end. Three months later, she raced in the Victoria Mile alongside Damian Lane, with Lemaire picked Embroidery on the day. This race saw her took an early lead and positioned herself in third position entering the final corner. Unfortunately, she gassed out, fell down the order, and finished in 16th place. Lane said that the horse was unable to maintain her final speed as he thought.

She finished her half-season on that note and prepared for the Niigata Kinen, which would be held in August. She would be ridden by Akihide Tsumura this time around, who was impressed with her footwork and attitude but also realized her recent bad form. On the day, Tsumura urged her to secure an early lead, but she did not give a good response on it, as if she was braking when Tsumura gave the command. She was running in the middling pack, competed with several horses surrounding her, and finished in eighth place on the line behind the winner, Zoroastro. Tsumura analysed the race, and from his standpoint, he thought that she was having a problem on the mental side of the game that hindered her from truly competing for the win. Two months later, she was prepared for the Queen Elizabeth II Cup at Kyoto in which Tsumura said that the horse was more toned and in good condition. Starting from the outside gate 14, Cervinia positioned herself at the back of the pack. She started making her move on the third corner but failed to accelerate to the front as she tailed off at the back of the pack in 14th place. Her jockey, Tom Marquand, made a tough remark by saying that she was giving up on the race as the horse did not response to his cue in the final straight. She was retired soon after this race and would become a broodmare.

== Racing statistics ==
The data below is based on data available on JBIS Search, NetKeiba, and Emirates Racing Authority.

Date	Track	Race	Grade	Distance (Condition)	Entry	HN	Odds (Favored)	Finish	Time	Margins	Jockey	Winner (Runner-up)
2023 – two-year-old season
Jun 4	Tokyo	2YO Newcomer		1,600 m (Good)	11	1	1.8 (1)	2nd	1:34.7	0.1	Christophe Lemaire	Bond Girl
Aug 12	Niigata	2YO Maiden		1,800 m (Firm)	10	6	1.1 (1)	1st	1:46.9	-1.0	Christophe Lemaire	(Lone Wolf)
Oct 28	Tokyo	Artemis Stakes	3	1,600 m (Firm)	10	4	1.5 (1)	1st	R1:33.6	-0.3	Christophe Lemaire	(Safira)
2024 – three-year-old season
Apr 7	Hanshin	Oka Sho	1	1,600 m (Firm)	18	18	6.1 (4)	13th	1:33.4	1.2	Bauyrzhan Murzabayev	Stellenbosch
May 19	Tokyo	Yushun Himba	1	2,400 m (Firm)	18	12	4.6 (2)	1st	2:24.0	-0.1	Christophe Lemaire	(Stellenbosch)
Oct 13	Kyoto	Shūka Sho	1	2,000 m (Firm)	15	5	2.3 (1)	1st	1:57.1	-0.3	Christophe Lemaire	(Bond Girl)
Nov 24	Tokyo	Japan Cup	1	2,400 m (Firm)	14	9	4.0 (2)	4th	2:25.9	0.4	Christophe Lemaire	Do Deuce
2025 – four-year-old season
Feb 16	Kyoto	Kyoto Kinen	2	2,200 m (Good)	12	6	1.8 (1)	9th	2:16.7	1.0	Christophe Lemaire	Yoho Lake
Apr 5	Meydan	Dubai Sheema Classic	1	2,410 m (Good)	9	8	15.0 (7)	6th	2:28.44	1.39	Christophe Lemaire	Danon Decile
Jun 22	Hanshin	Shirasagi Stakes	3	1,600 m (Firm)	14	7	4.0 (1)	2nd	1:33.2	0.2	Christophe Lemaire	Keep Calm
Oct 5	Tokyo	Mainichi Ōkan	2	1,800 m (Firm)	11	6	5.0 (3)	7th	1:44.7	0.7	Keita Tosaki	Lebensstil
Nov 23	Kyoto	Mile Championship	1	1,600 m (Firm)	18	7	45.4 (8)	10th	1:32.2	0.9	Tom Marquand	Jantar Mantar
2026 – five-year-old season
Mar 1	Nakayama	Nakayama Kinen	2	1,800 m (Firm)	14	6	7.7 (5)	5th	1:45.5	0.4	Christophe Lemaire	Lebensstil
May 17	Tokyo	Victoria Mile	1	1,600 m (Firm)	18	18	19.9 (6)	16th	1:32.0	1.1	Damian Lane	Embroidery
Aug 30	Niigata	Niigata Kinen	3	2,000 m (Good)	11	6	15.5 (6)	8th	2:00.0	0.4	Akihide Tsumura	Zoroastro
Nov 15	Kyoto	Queen Elizabeth II Cup	1	2,200 m (Soft)	18	14	50.8 (13)	14th	2:15.8	1.1	Tom Marquand	Laughterlines

Legend:
Turf

- R indicated that it was a record finish time.

== Pedigree ==
Pedigree of Cervinia (JPN), bay filly 2021
Sire Harbinger (GB) b. 2006	Dansili dk.b. 1996	Danehill (USA)	Danzig
Sire Harbinger (GB) b. 2006	Dansili dk.b. 1996	Danehill (USA)	Razyana
Sire Harbinger (GB) b. 2006	Dansili dk.b. 1996	Hasili (IRE)	Kahyasi
Sire Harbinger (GB) b. 2006	Dansili dk.b. 1996	Hasili (IRE)	Kerali (GB)
Sire Harbinger (GB) b. 2006	Penang Pearl (FR) b. 1996	Bering (GB)	Arctic Tern (USA)
Sire Harbinger (GB) b. 2006	Penang Pearl (FR) b. 1996	Bering (GB)	Beaune (FR)
Sire Harbinger (GB) b. 2006	Penang Pearl (FR) b. 1996	Guapa (GB)	Shareef Dancer (USA)
Sire Harbinger (GB) b. 2006	Penang Pearl (FR) b. 1996	Guapa (GB)	Sauceboat
Dam Cecchino ch. 2013	King Kamehameha b. 2001	Kingmambo (USA)	Mr. Prospector
Dam Cecchino ch. 2013	King Kamehameha b. 2001	Kingmambo (USA)	Miesque
Dam Cecchino ch. 2013	King Kamehameha b. 2001	Manfath (IRE)	Last Tycoon
Dam Cecchino ch. 2013	King Kamehameha b. 2001	Manfath (IRE)	Pilot Bird (GB)
Dam Cecchino ch. 2013	Happy Path b. 1998	Sunday Silence (USA)	Halo
Dam Cecchino ch. 2013	Happy Path b. 1998	Sunday Silence (USA)	Wishing Well
Dam Cecchino ch. 2013	Happy Path b. 1998	Happy Trails (IRE)	Posse (USA)
Dam Cecchino ch. 2013	Happy Path b. 1998	Happy Trails (IRE)	Roycon (GB) (Family: 4-d)

- Her dam, Cecchino, won the 2016 Flora Stakes, placing second in the Yushun Himba right after.
- Her granddam, Happy Path, won the 2003 Kyoto Himba Stakes. Her half-sister, Shinko Lovely, won the 1993 Mile Championship.
- Her older half-brother, Nocking Point, won the 2023 Niigata Kinen.
