= Regaleira =

Japanese racehorse

Regaleira レガレイラ
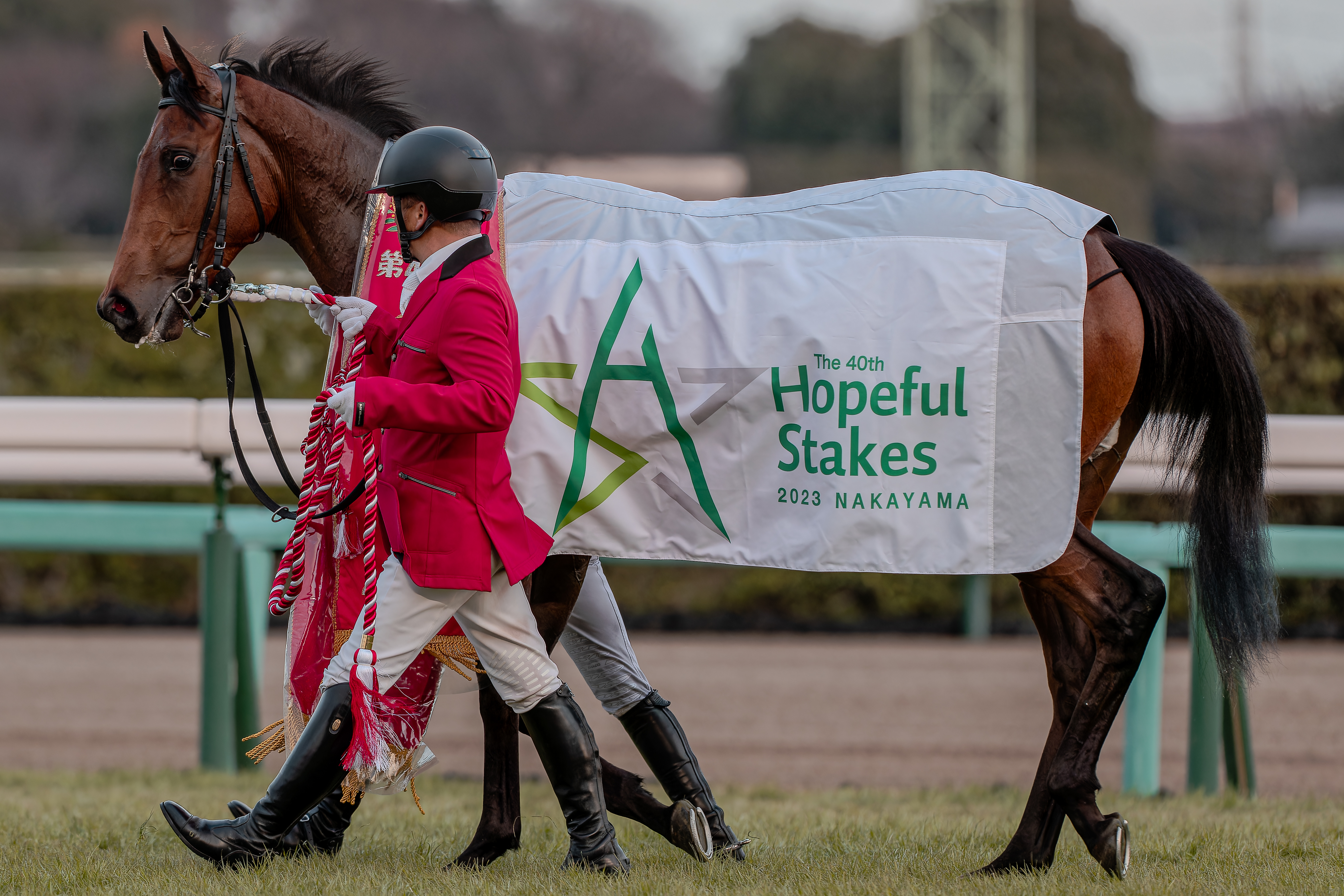
- Regaleira after winning the 2023 Hopeful Stakes
- Sire: Suave Richard
- Grandsire: Heart's Cry
- Dam: Roca
- Damsire: Harbinger
- Sex: Filly
- Foaled: April 12, 2021 (age 5)
- Country: Japan
- Color: Bay
- Breeder: Northern Farm
- Owner: Sunday Racing Co. Ltd.
- Racing colours
- Trainer: Tetsuya Kimura
- Jockey: Keita Tosaki
- Record: 15: 5-0-2
- Earnings: 996,147,000 JPY

Major wins
- Hopeful Stakes (2023); Arima Kinen (2024); Sankei Sho All Comers (2025); Queen Elizabeth II Cup (2025)

Awards
- JRA Award for Best Older Filly or Mare (2025)
- Last updated on September 20, 2026

Regaleira (Japanese: レガレイラ, foaled April 12, 2021) is an active Japanese Thoroughbred racehorse. She won the 2023 Hopeful Stakes, the 2024 Arima Kinen and the 2025 Queen Elizabeth II Cup. After her 2025 season, she was awarded the JRA Award for Best Older Filly or Mare.

She was named after Quinta da Regaleira, a palace located at Sintra, Portugal.

== Racing career ==
=== 2023: two-year-old season ===
Regaleira debuted at the Hakodate Racecourse on July 9 in a two-year-old newcomer race on turf at a distance of 1,800 meters. Started as the 1.4-odds favorite, her jockey, Christophe Lemaire, sat her in the middle of the pack, and on the final straight, she overtook the frontrunner to win the race.

Following that, she competed in the Listed Ivy Stakes on October 21. Once again, she was the most favored horse. She ran in third position and made a determined effort to close the gap in the final stretch but fell short, finishing in third place behind Danon Ayers Rock.

On December 28, she competed in her first graded stakes race and first Grade 1 race, the Hopeful Stakes at Nakayama Racecourse. After trailing in the rear during the early stages, she unleashed an exceptional finishing burst on the outside in the final stretch, overtaking Shin Emperor to claim victory. This marked the first time a filly won the Hopeful Stakes since it became an open race for both colts and fillies in 2000. (Note: The race was restricted to colts and geldings from 1991 to 2003, and fillies were not allowed to participate.) Additionally, this was the first victory by a filly in a mixed 2-year-old Grade 1 race since Tenmon won the Asahi Hai Futurity Stakes in 1980. This was also the first Grade 1 victory for a Suave Richard progeny.

=== 2024: three-year-old season ===
In her first start as a three-year-old, Regaleira would go straight to Satsuki Shō. Had she won, it would have been the first time in 76 years that a filly had won the Satsuki Sho since Hidehikari in 1948, making her only the third filly in history to achieve this. Additionally, Shunsuke Yoshida, the representative of Sunday Racing, revealed plans to challenge the Tōkyō Yūshun (Japanese Derby). Yoshida stated, "Although the Satsuki Sho will be her next race, the jockey has not yet been decided. Since she was registered for the Classics, including both the Satsuki Sho and the Derby, right from the initial registration, we are hopeful for strong performances over longer distances. Given that she is challenging colts in the Satsuki Sho, the Derby is also an option."

While a victory by a filly was highly anticipated for the first time in six years, she finished sixth in the Satsuki Sho. Following the race, she was shuttled to Northern Farm Tenei for rest. Regarding her next race, the Sunday Thoroughbred Club mentioned on their website that they would "consider the options based on how she feels after the rest." However, on April 28, the club announced that she would still compete in the Derby, held at Tokyo Racecourse on May 26. This marked the first time a filly would race in both the Satsuki Sho and the Derby since the introduction of the grading system in 1984. The club also announced on May 8 that Regaleira would return to Miho Training Center on May 10, which she did as scheduled. Notably, Christophe Lemaire, her regular jockey, was unable to return to Japan for the Satsuki Sho due to a fall in a race in Dubai that resulted in a punctured lung (traumatic pneumothorax), so Hiroshi Kitamura stepped in as a substitute. However, Lemaire will reunite with her for the Derby.

On May 10, the Sunday Thoroughbred Club announced that Regaleira had been entered for the Prix de l'Arc de Triomphe, scheduled at Longchamp Racecourse on October 6. According to the explanation, "Given her performance so far and the advantageous weight of 55 kilograms for three-year-old fillies, depending on her performance in the Derby against colts, we are considering aiming for the Prix de l'Arc de Triomphe." However, in the Tokyo Yushun, where she was the second favourite, she got off to a slow start and, due to her second gate position, was unable to get into a good position and raced from the back. In the straight, she made a strong run from the outside but finished in fifth place. Lemaire said after the race that he regretted that he could not place Regaleira in the right position at the right time.

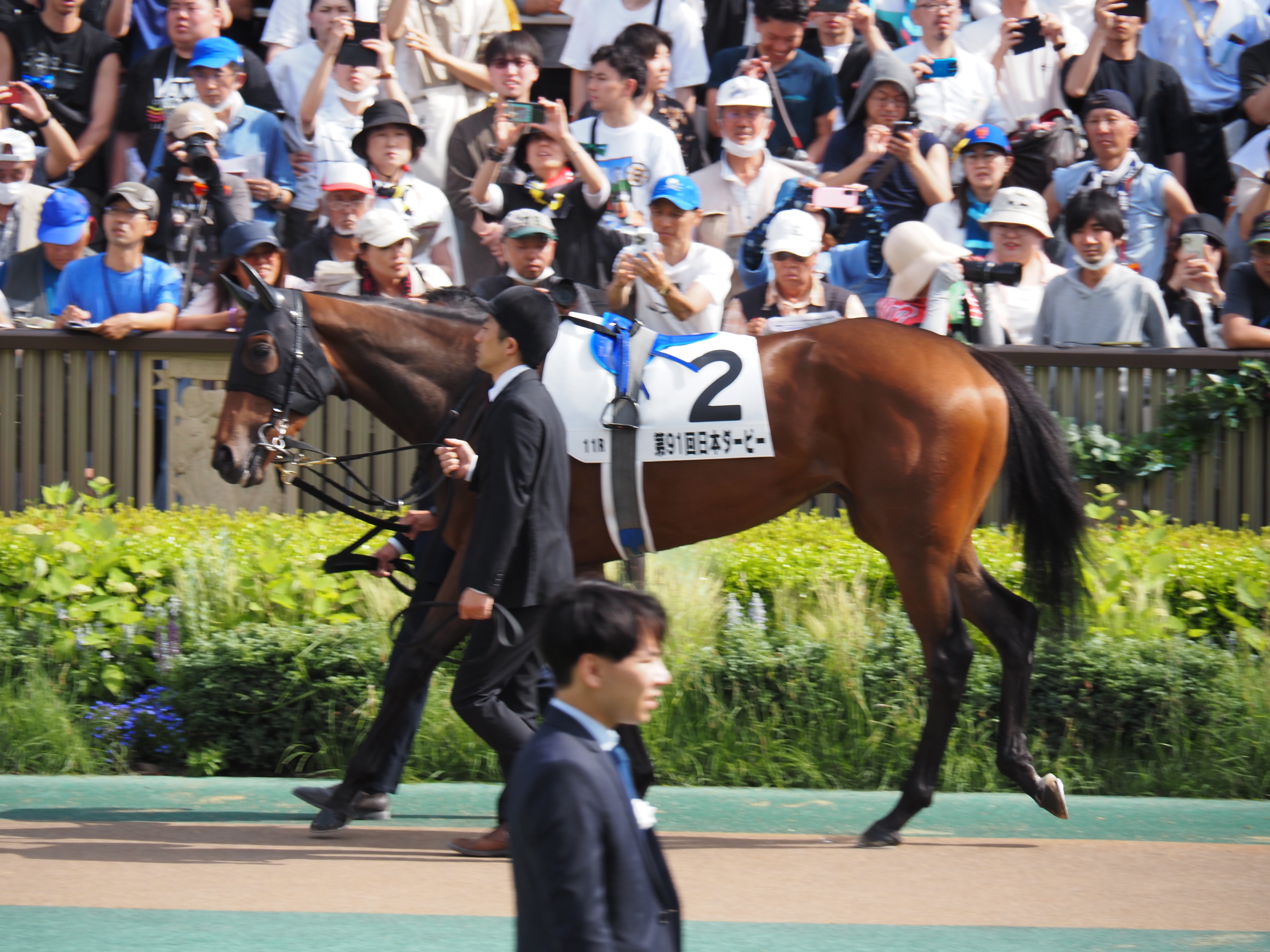
Regaleira at the 2024 Tokyo Yushun paddock

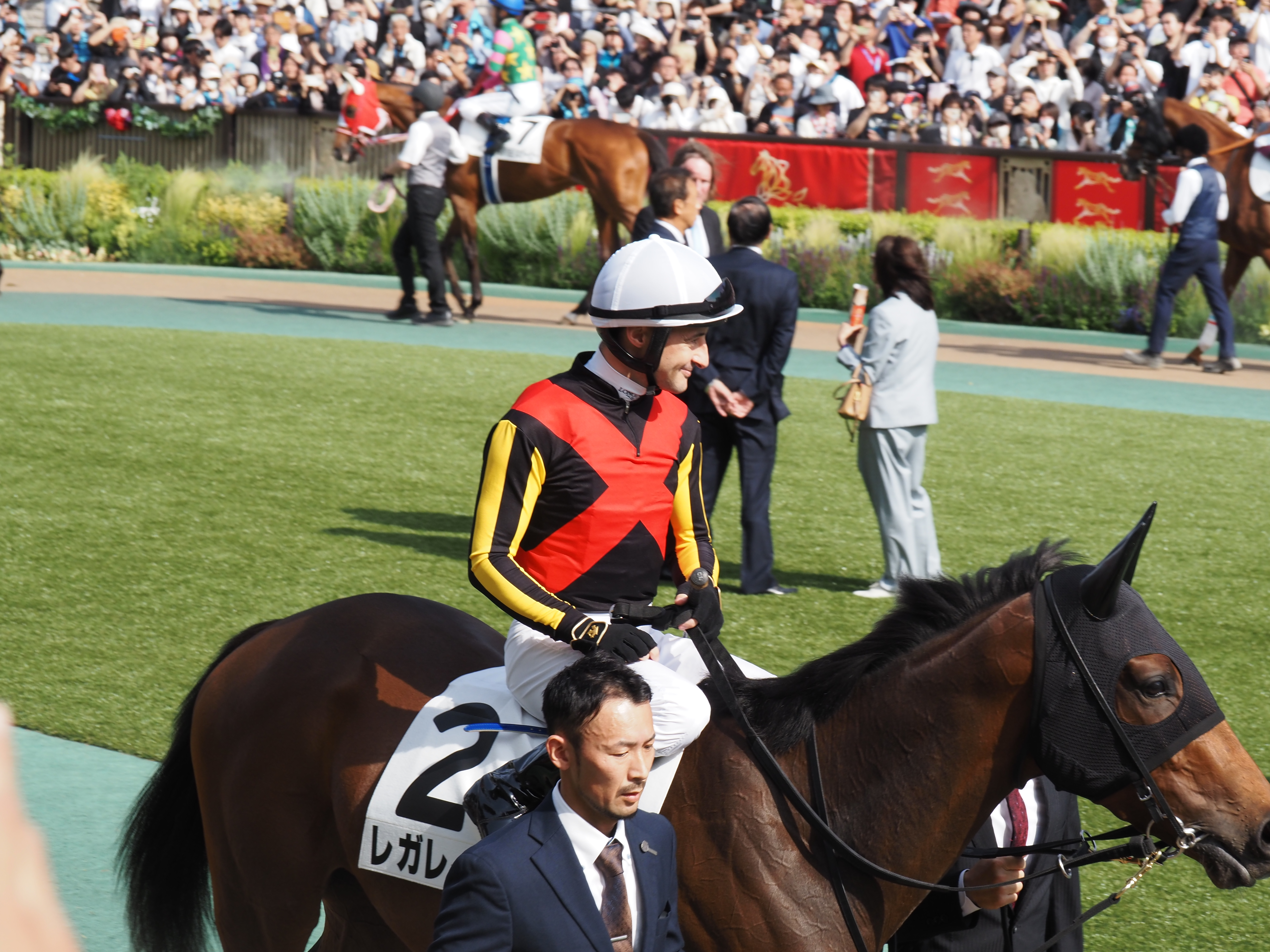
Regaleira with her jockey, Christophe Lemaire

With this performance, Sunday Racing decided to send her to pastures and prepared her for the Rose Stakes in September. She would not join the L'Arc race to focus on the domestic campaign instead. As a favourite for the race, she had a bad start from the gate and raced from the back. In the final straight, she made a strong charge from the far outside but finished fifth. Lemaire said the race was tough from the beginning as it was a tough ask for any horse to make a chase from behind in Chukyo. At the end of September, she was deemed to skip the Shuka Sho and enter the senior mare-exclusive race, the Queen Elizabeth II Cup instead. During the race, Regaleira tracked in the middle of the pack during the race. In the straight, she got stuck in a narrow space, could not make a burst of speed, and finished in fifth place for the second consecutive race. Lemaire reflected, "I couldn't get the position I wanted. I was a little too far back. I bumped into someone in the straight, and I couldn't have a smooth race."

By the end of the season, she was selected to run in the Arima Kinen. As Lemaire selected Urban Chic to ride on the day, her ride was given to another jockey - Keita Tosaki. Her new jockey was impressed with her temperament, movement, and handling in the workout leading up to race day. On race day, she started from gate 8 and raced as the fifth favourite. As the gates opened, Regaleira was settled off the pace in fifth to sixth, alongside the tenth favourite Shahryar traveling two to three lengths behind in mid-division. After steadily cruising down the backstretch, Shahryar gradually made headway from the outside before the third corner, whilst Regaleira slightly shifted out for clear sailing at the final turn. Entering the straight, the duel between Regaleira and Shahryar erupted. Both horses unleashed a furious drive and a head-to-head battle all the way to the wire while picking off the tired pacesetter, Danon Decile, 50 meters from the line. It was decided that Regaleira just eked Shahryar by a nose to take her second GI win. This was the first time a three-year-old filly won the Arima Kinen in 64 years since Star Roch did back in 1960. Tosaki was feeling grateful and pointed out that her good start was the key to the win, and was happy he could get the horse racing in rhythm and trigger her final speed in the end.

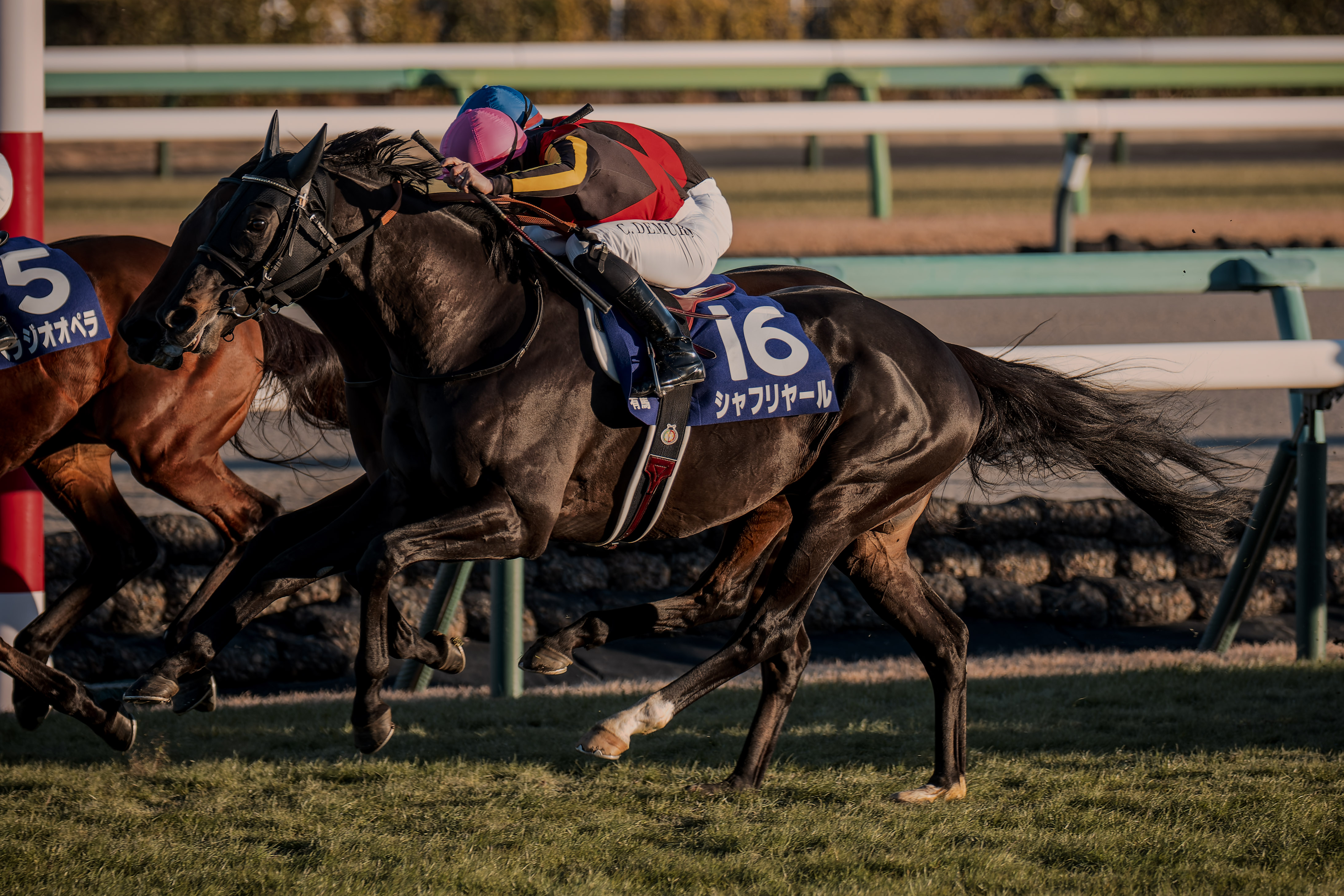
Shahryar (pink cap) and Regaleira (blue cap on the inside) dueling in the Arima Kinen

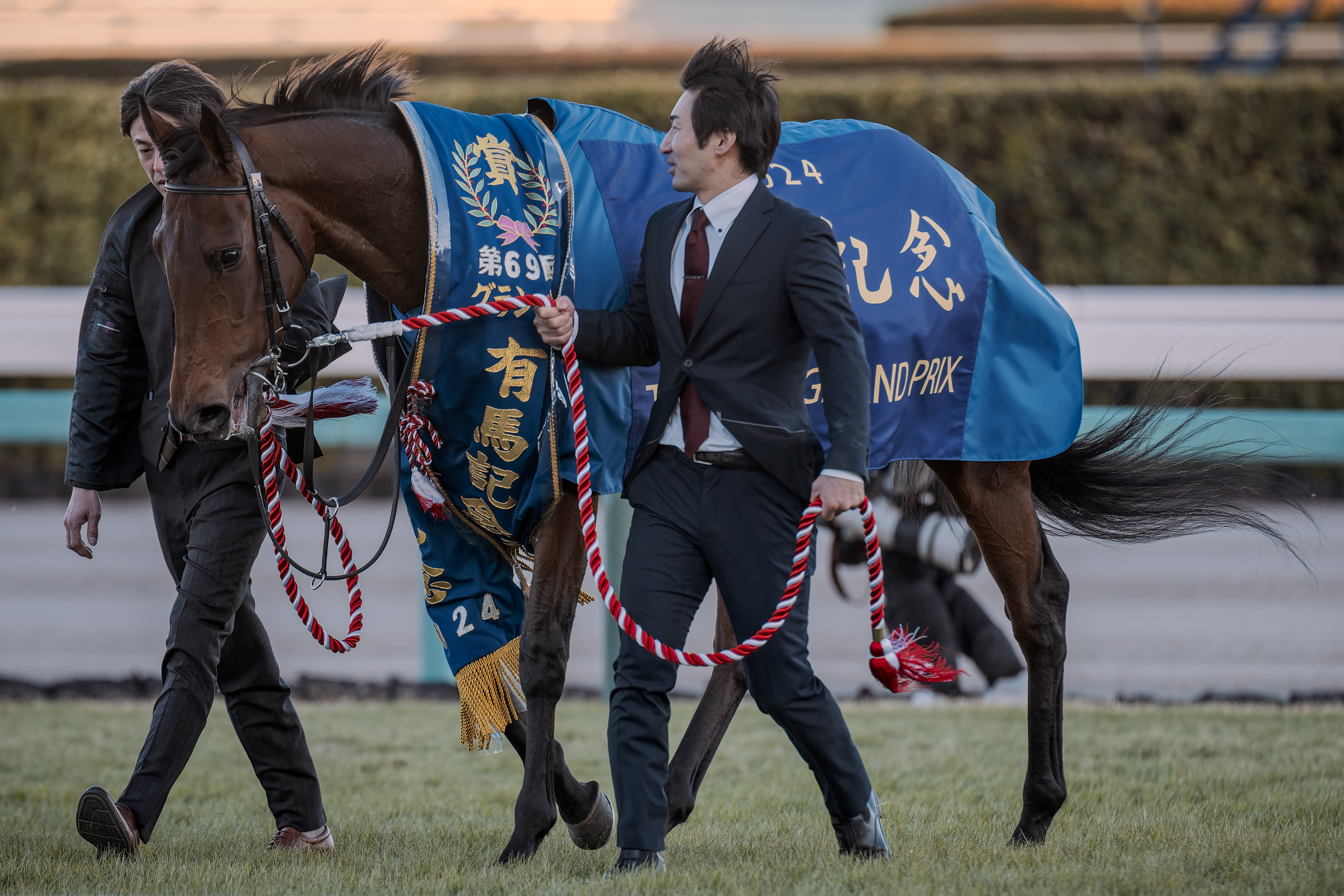
Regaleira after winning the 2024 Arima Kinen

On 25 December, after the race, it was discovered that the horse had suffered an avulsion fracture of the first phalanx of its right foreleg, and it was diagnosed that it would take more than three months to fully recover. Based on Sunday Racing's announcement, the horse's fetlock joint on its right foreleg was swollen after the race, and an X-ray examination revealed the avulsion fracture. She underwent surgery on 28 December. This surgery removed two bone fragments from her injured legs, which was a success. The horse would be monitored post-operatively and sent out to Northern Farm for pasture in the new year. She lost the best three-year-old filly award for the season to her stablemate, Cervinia, who won the Yushun Himba and Shuka Sho.

=== 2025: four-year-old season ===
The first news about the horse's health update came in January, when the boss of Sunday Racing, Shunsuke Yoshida, stated that she was still resting and her future races were undecided at that point. He also predicted that she would fully recover in two or three months. Two months later, she was being registered to race in the L'Arc in October as she showed a good pace during the cantering recuperation. The horse returned to the Miho Training Center in May and she would be prepared for the Takarazuka Kinen, one month later. One week before the race, Regaleira moved really well in the workout and did not show signs of fatigue from her recovery process. She was drawn to start from the outermost gate, gate 17, and raced as the second favourite for the day. At the start of the race, the horse settled well on pace in eighth position. She moved wide on the outside at the third corner and tried to advance from the pack. She failed to accelerate at the final straight, dropped the order a bit, and finished in 11th place.

The L'Arc dream was cancelled once again as her poor results made Sunday Racing pivot her to the Sapporo Kinen or Sankei Sho All Comers instead in August. Eventually, the team decided to put her on the All Comers instead and skipped the Sapporo Kinen. This race would see her battling her half-brother, Douradores (sired by Duramente), for the first time. When the race began, she tracked in fourth place from the rear. As they entered the backstretch, she gradually moved up the order. As they went from the third to the fourth corner, she gained momentum and entered the straight. She launched her final spurt, overtook Douradores, and won the race by one and a quarter lengths ahead of her half-brother. Instead of using the automatic berth for the Tenno Sho (Autumn), she was sent to race in the Queen Elizabeth II Cup race, where she finished in fifth the previous season instead. She would start from the same gate as she did in this race last year, gate 7, and was nominated as the favourite at 2.2 odds to one. Breaking smoothly from stall seven, Regaleira traveled wide in the early phase, around tenth to eleventh position in the middle. She navigated the final turns wide before unleashing a powerful charge in the final stretch, nailing the front 50 meters from the line and easily pulling away for a one-and-three-quarters-length victory with a record time, sealing her third GI title.

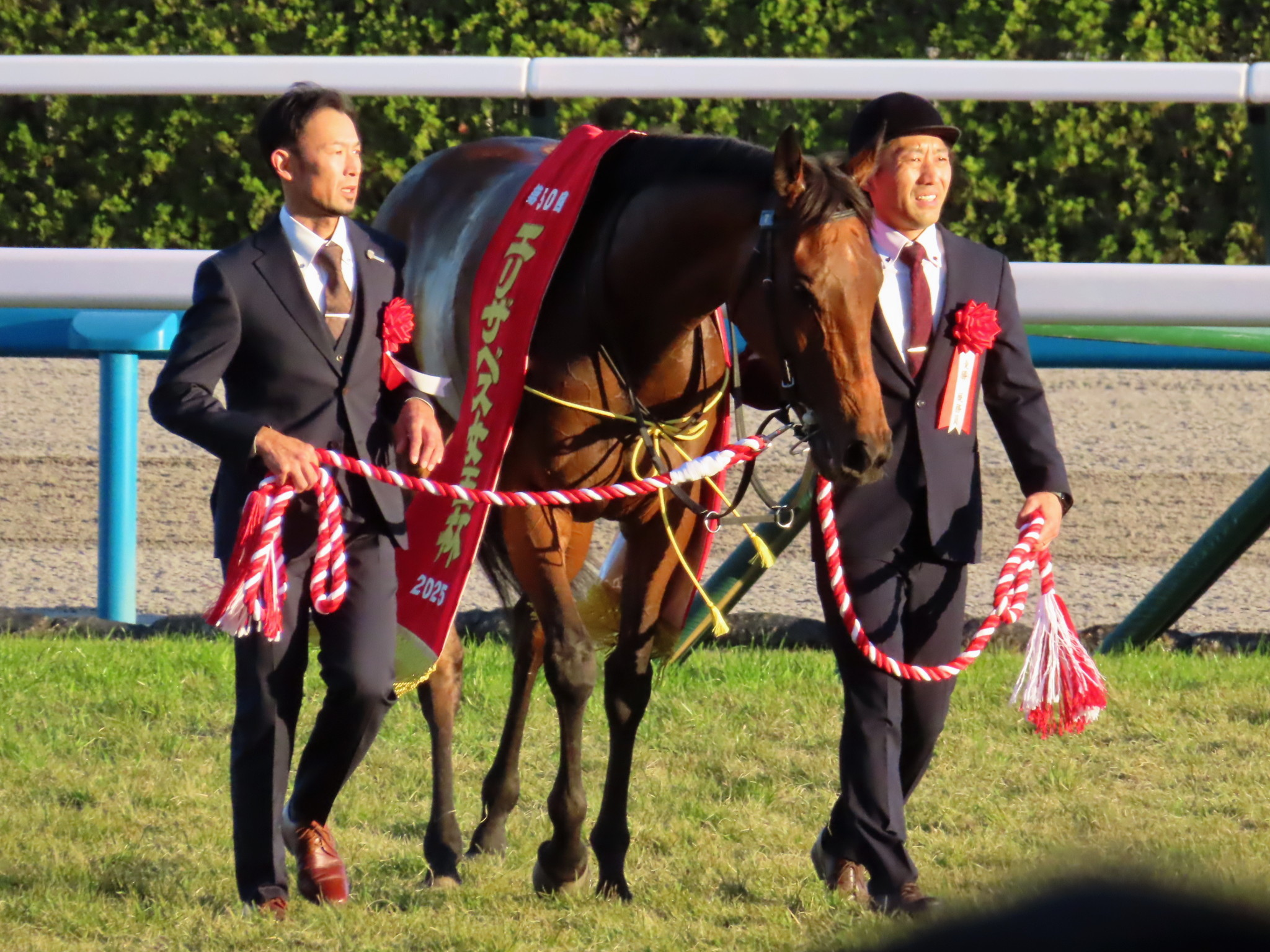
Regaleira, winner of the 2025 Queen Elizabeth II Cup

On 4 December, it was announced that Regaleira would try to defend her title at the Arima Kinen alongside her old jockey, Christophe Lemaire, as Tosaki picked Danon Decile in that race. On 11 December, the JRA announced the final results of the Arima Kinen fan vote, and Regaleira was supported as the clear winner with 612,771 votes, far surpassing the previous record of 478,415 votes set by Do Deuce the previous year. As the race favourite, she botched the start and raced toward the rear, near 14th position as it began. She met massive traffic entering the final stint. Despite that, she slipped through a narrow gap and unleashed the tied-fastest final last three furlongs time. Unfortunately, she was too far back at the start of the straight and only improved to finish in fourth place on the line. In the post race interview, Lemaire said the horse could not react in time and took a longer time to get going for the final burst. Due to her good performance for the year with two wins in four starts (which included another GI win), she was awarded the best older filly or mare for the year.

=== 2026: five-year-old season ===
She was rested for almost half a year and only returned to the training centre on 6 May. On the same day, Sunday Racing announced on its website that she would run in the Takarazuka Kinen on 14 June. For this race, she would resume her partnership with Lemaire as her jockey. In the final workout session, she showed a sharp burst of acceleration. Assistant trainer Ota said that they put the horse through a substantial workout on the whole backstretch after the finishing line. They believed this was meaningful training for her as she had been off the track for so long. From gate 17, she ran wide in 17th position at the beginning of the race. She was struggling the whole race due to the rougher track conditions, as she failed to launch her usual late speed burst in the straight. She finished in a respectable seventh place on the day. Lemaire noted her inability to shift gears at the end and lamented that the horse had to come on a poor track right after her prolonged rest.

In August, it was announced that Regaleira would begin her autumn season in the Sankei Sho All Comers and aimed for a back-to-back win this time around. One week before the race, Ota said that the horse's workout was progressing as intended. He also said that her balance had been improved as she ran in the middle pack for most of the session. Tosaki was confirmed to return as her jockey once again three days before the race started. It was raining heavily on the race day which turned the track conditions into "heavy" status whilst the racecourse also being changed on the day. This situation did not affect Regaleira in the early stretch as she ran in the middle to front and chased the pack as usual. As soon as she reached the final corner, she was in a perfect position to strike, but she failed to launch her finishing kick in the homestretch. She finished in fourth place at the line and thus failed to defend her title. Tosaki claimed that the horse could not burst out to the lead was due to the soft track, citing heavy track conditions. In November, it was decided that she would run in the Tenno Sho (Autumn) with a new jockey, Mirai Iwata. Iwata was intrigued by the request and said that the horse was easy to ride and responsive enough to his cue in their first workout. Expecting a great improvement and final results, he aimed to do his best with the horse. At the gate draw, Regaleira was chosen to start from an inside gate, Gate 3. On the day, she made a good start and ran her race alongside Masquerade Ball and Nebra Disk in the middle. As the group reached the straight, she was in the right position and found a gap near the rails to launch her final strikes. Nebra Disk and Regaleira were pulling away and dueling together, but the latter failed to maintain her pace 200 metres from the line as both horses watched Danon Decile blazing through from the outside and overtook both of them for the win. Meanwhile, she finished in third place behind Nebra Disk but held down that position against the surging Tagano Dude, Croix du Nord and Shake Your Heart by one and a quarter lengths. In the post race, Iwata was happy as they did run as planned, praised that the horse was able to put a fight against the colts, commented that the draw was a bit disadvantageous as he thought that the outside draw might be better, and admitted that the winning horse was the strongest on that day.

== Racing statistics ==
The information below is based on data available on JBIS Search, and NetKeiba.

Date	Track	Race	Grade	Distance (Condition)	Entry	HN	Odds (Favored)	Finish	Time	Margins	Jockey	Winner (Runner-up)
2023 – two-year-old season
Jul 9	Hakodate	2YO Newcomer		1,800 m (Firm)	9	6	1.4 (1)	1st	1:49.8	-0.2	Christophe Lemaire	(Set Up)
Oct 21	Tokyo	Ivy Stakes	L	1,800 m (Firm)	6	3	1.5 (1)	3rd	1:48.4	0.2	Christophe Lemaire	Danon Ayers Rock
Dec 28	Nakayama	Hopeful Stakes	1	2,000 m (Firm)	16	13	3.1 (1)	1st	R2:00.2 (Note: Set a track record for two-year-olds)	-0.1	Christophe Lemaire	(Shin Emperor)
2024 – three-year-old season
Apr 14	Nakayama	Satsuki Shō	1	2,000 m (Firm)	17	10	3.7 (1)	6th	1:57.6	0.5	Hiroshi Kitamura	Justin Milano
May 26	Tokyo	Tōkyō Yūshun	1	2,400 m (Firm)	17	2	4.5 (2)	5th	2:25.0	0.7	Christophe Lemaire	Danon Decile
Sep 15	Chukyo	Rose Stakes	2	2,000 m (Good)	15	15	1.7 (1)	5th	2:00.3	0.4	Christophe Lemaire	Queen's Walk
Nov 10	Kyoto	Queen Elizabeth II Cup	1	2,200 m (Good)	17	7	1.9 (1)	5th	2:11.6	0.5	Christophe Lemaire	Stunning Rose
Dec 22	Nakayama	Arima Kinen	1	2,500 m (Firm)	15	8	10.9 (5)	1st	2:31.8	0.0	Keita Tosaki	(Shahryar)
2025 – four-year-old season
Jun 15	Hanshin	Takarazuka Kinen	1	2,200 m (Good)	17	17	4.9 (2)	11th	2:12.6	1.5	Keita Tosaki	Meisho Tabaru
Sep 21	Nakayama	All Comers	2	2,200 m (Firm)	11	4	3.3 (1)	1st	R2:10.2 (Note: Set a new race record time)	-0.2	Keita Tosaki	(Douradores)
Nov 16	Kyoto	Queen Elizabeth II Cup	1	2,200 m (Firm)	16	7	2.3 (1)	1st	R2:11.0 (Note: Set a new race record time)	-0.3	Keita Tosaki	(Paradis Reine)
Dec 28	Nakayama	Arima Kinen	1	2,500 m (Firm)	16	5	3.3 (1)	4th	2:31.7	0.2	Christophe Lemaire	Museum Mile
2026 – five-year-old season
Jun 14	Hanshin	Takarazuka Kinen	1	2,200 m (Good)	18	17	7.8 (5)	7th	2:13.7	1.6	Christophe Lemaire	Meisho Tabaru
Sep 20	Nakayama	All Comers	2	2,200 m (Heavy)	13	7	3.1 (1)	4th	2:17.4	0.5	Keita Tosaki	Meisho Gekirin
Nov 1	Tokyo	Tenno Sho (Autumn)	1	2,000 m (Firm)	17	3	10.0 (3)	3rd	1:57.2	0.5	Mirai Iwata	Danon Decile

Legend:
Turf

== Pedigree ==
Pedigree of Regaleira (JPN), bay filly 2021
Sire Suave Richard ch. 2014	Heart's Cry b. 2001	Sunday Silence (USA)	Halo
Sire Suave Richard ch. 2014	Heart's Cry b. 2001	Sunday Silence (USA)	Wishing Well
Sire Suave Richard ch. 2014	Heart's Cry b. 2001	Irish Dance	Tony Bin (IRE)
Sire Suave Richard ch. 2014	Heart's Cry b. 2001	Irish Dance	Buper Dance (USA)
Sire Suave Richard ch. 2014	Pirramimma (USA) dk.b. 2005	Unbridled's Song	Unbridled
Sire Suave Richard ch. 2014	Pirramimma (USA) dk.b. 2005	Unbridled's Song	Trolley Song
Sire Suave Richard ch. 2014	Pirramimma (USA) dk.b. 2005	Career Collection	General Meeting
Sire Suave Richard ch. 2014	Pirramimma (USA) dk.b. 2005	Career Collection	River of Stars
Dam Roca b. 2012	Harbinger (GB) b. 2006	Dansili	Danehill (USA)
Dam Roca b. 2012	Harbinger (GB) b. 2006	Dansili	Hasili (IRE)
Dam Roca b. 2012	Harbinger (GB) b. 2006	Penang Pearl (FR)	Bering (GB)
Dam Roca b. 2012	Harbinger (GB) b. 2006	Penang Pearl (FR)	Guapa (GB)
Dam Roca b. 2012	Land's Edge b. 2006	Dance in the Dark	Sunday Silence (USA)
Dam Roca b. 2012	Land's Edge b. 2006	Dance in the Dark	Dancing Key (USA)
Dam Roca b. 2012	Land's Edge b. 2006	Wind in Her Hair (IRE)	Alzao (USA)
Dam Roca b. 2012	Land's Edge b. 2006	Wind in Her Hair (IRE)	Burghclere (GB) (Family: 2-f)

- Her dam, Roca, is a 1-win horse. She placed 3rd in Queen Cup in 2015.
- She is related to the 2024 Oka Sho winner, Stellenbosch, through Land's Edge.
- Land's Edge's half brother is Deep Impact and Black Tide.
- Wind in Her Hair won the Grosser Preis von Bayern in 1995.
