= Durezza (horse) =

Japanese thoroughbred racehorse

Durezza ドゥレッツァ
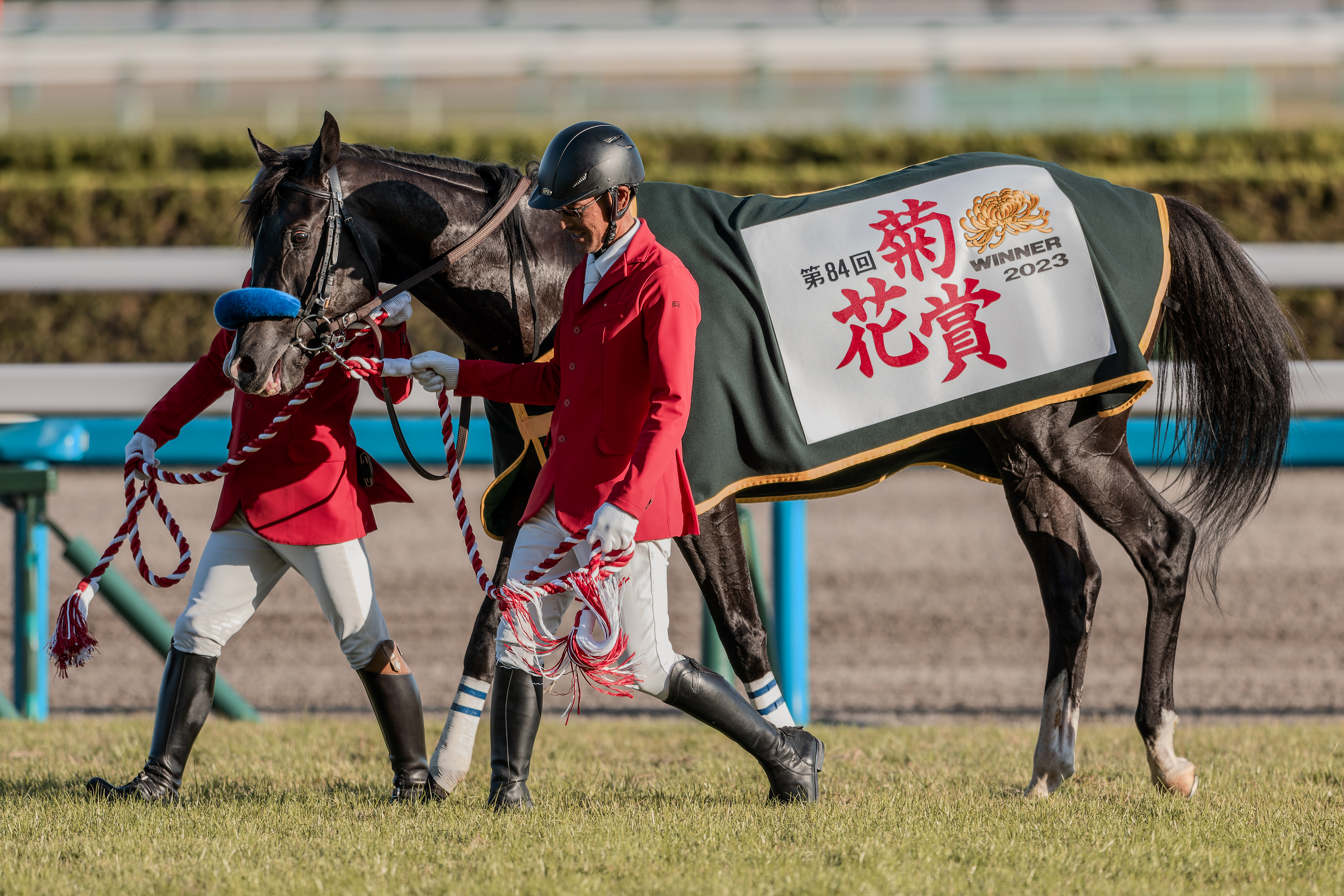
- Durezza after winning the 2023 Kikuka-shō
- Sire: Duramente
- Grandsire: King Kamehameha
- Dam: More Than Sacred
- Damsire: More Than Ready
- Sex: Colt
- Foaled: April 24, 2020 (age 6)
- Country: Japan
- Color: Brown
- Breeder: Northern Farm
- Owner: Carrot Farm Co. Ltd.
- Racing colours
- Trainer: Tomohito Ozeki
- Jockey: Christophe Lemaire
- Record: 15: 5-2-2
- Earnings: 572,438,100 JPY (Note: Earnings earned overseas are converted to JPY using the formula provided by JRA. 2024, 2025.); JPN: 472,178,000 JPY; UK: 33,625 GBP; UAE: 600,000 USD

Major wins
- Kikuka-shō (2023)
- Last updated on August 30, 2026

Durezza（Japanese: ドゥレッツァ, Hepburn: Durettsa; foaled April 24, 2020）is an active Japanese Thoroughbred racehorse. He won the 2023 Kikuka-shō.

His name means "harshness" or hardness and is related to his sire's name.

== Racing career ==
=== 2022: two-year-old season ===
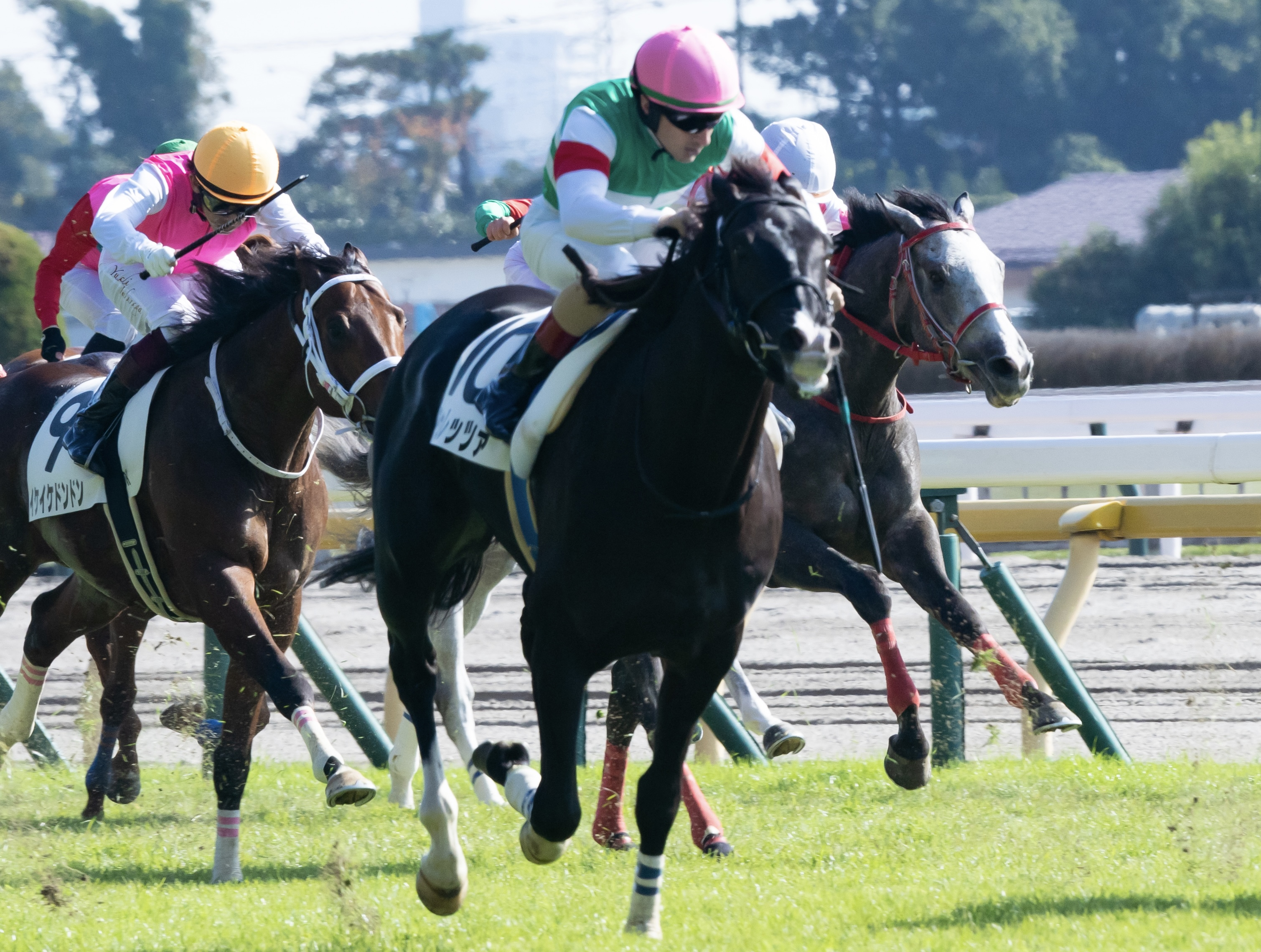
Durezza in his debut race

Durezza made his debut at the Nakayama Racecourse on September 9, 2022, in a two-year-old newcomer race on turf at the distance of 2,000 meters. He was ridden by Christophe Lemaire and finished third. Two months later, he finally won his first race in a race for winless two-year old horses on turf at the same distance as his last race but on Tokyo Racecourse, ridden by Christophe Lemaire once again. He defeated the later winner of the Kobe Shimbun Hai, Satono Glanz.

=== 2023: three-year-old season ===
Durezza was set to race in the Saintpaulia Sho at Tokyo Racecourse in January for his three-year-old season debut, but it was postponed due to hoof anxiety. After three months of recovery, on April 2, 2023, he returned to the track and won the Yamabuki Sho run over 2,200 meters at Nakayama Racecourse. He missed the spring classics due to the circumstances brought by his injury. He won his next two races, The Hong Kong Jockey Club Trophy and the Nihonkai Stakes, which promoted him to the open class after winning 4 times.

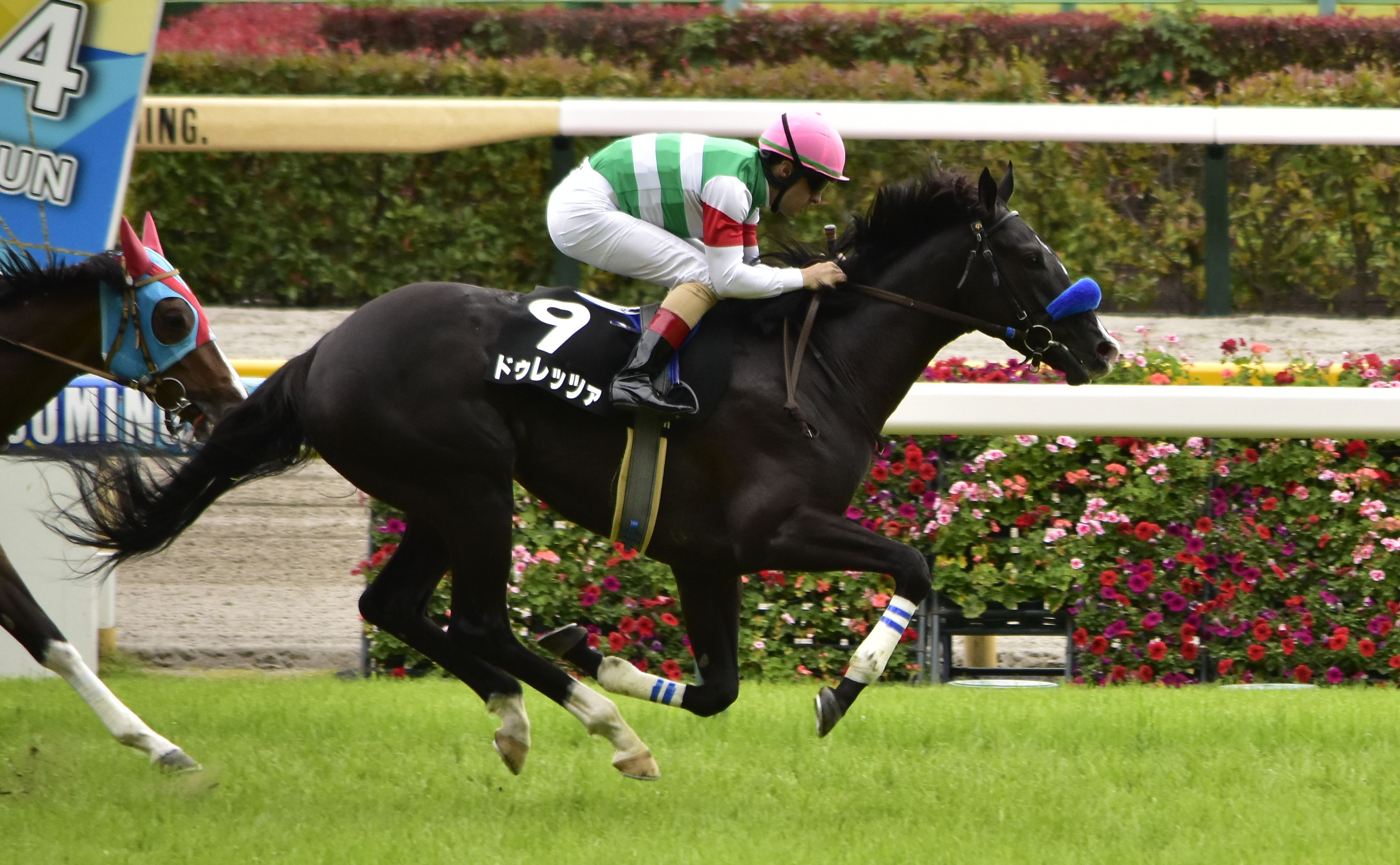
Durezza running in the Hong Kong Jockey Club Trophy

Later in the year, on October 22, he finally made his first Graded stakes challenge. He was entered in the Grade 1 Kikuka-shō at the distance of 3,000 meters at Kyoto Racecourse, the final leg of the Japanese Triple Crown, with jockey Christophe Lemaire again in the saddle. He was favored 4th behind the Satsuki Shō winner Sol Oriens, Tōkyō Yūshun winner Tastiera, and the Kikuka-sho trial Kobe Shimbun Hai winner Satono Glanz. Starting from gate 17, which is second from the outermost gate, he broke out of the gates at an average speed but sped forward right after the initial hill climb at the back stretch, taking the lead from Pax Ottomanica by their first pass of the fourth corner. Into the front stretch, finishing the first 1,000 meters at 60.4 seconds, he led the pack until they entered the back stretch once more, where Pax Ottomanica passed him. He fell to third position after Libyan Glass passed him before the final hill climb at the back stretch. As the pack widened before entering the third corner once more, he maintained his position by the rail. He once again sped up entering the downhill portion by the middle of the third corner, tracking Libyan Glass, who now took the lead from Pax Ottomanica. As they entered the final straight, he ran up and sped past Libyan Glass and took the lead with close to 300 meters left, holding on to it and winning the race with three and a half lengths away from the late-surging Tokyo Yushun winner Tastiera, with Satsuki Sho winner Sol Oriens at third. With this, he has won five consecutive races and is the first time since Mejiro McQueen in 1990 that the winning horse has not raced in a graded stakes prior. This is also the first time in 24 years that the winning horse has beaten both the Satsuki Sho and the Tokyo Yushun horse in the same race, the last one being Narita Top Road in 1999 beating T M Opera O and Admire Vega. Durezza would be rested for the rest of the season to recover and prepare for the next year.

=== 2024: four-year-old season ===
To start the season, Ozeki picked the Kinko Sho as the best option for the horse. In the workout leading up to the race, Ozeki said the horse was a bit keen recently, but he did everything being asked to do during training. In this race, Durezza started a bit slow and rested in the middle of the pack for most. Midway through the backstretch, it moved up from the inside and ran neck and neck with Prognosis. At the final corner, Prognosis moved inside whilst Durezza tried the outside. He himself failed to match Prognosis's pace at the end, finishing in second place five lengths behind. Lemaire said after the race that the horse's rhythm was a bit unstable, but he had a good response and stretched well enough in the end, whilst Ozeki said the horse got a passing grade for the race. In April, it was decided that his next horse would be the Tenno Sho (Spring). His jockey this time would be Keita Tosaki, as Lemaire was injured during his expedition in Dubai. One week before the race, Tosaki gave feedback on the horse by stating that even though the horse was unable to get ahead of his training partner, Red Avanti, in the workout, he was able to get the work done and his mental state was stable leading up to the race week. On the day, Durezza led the race early from the gate. Reaching the final straight, he lost momentum, faded to the back marker, and finished in 15th place. Tosaki remarked that he was deeply sorry about the performance and said that the horse did not give the intended response to spurt as he moved inwards during the third corner. He was diagnosed with an avulsion fracture of the proximal phalanx of the right first digit, which needed at least three months to recover. Despite this setback, there was an intent to join the Prix de l'Arc de Triomphe in October.

In August, there was a surprise entry for the horse as he was pivoted to race in the Juddmonte International at York. Ozeki explained that his training in Newmarket prior to the race was good, as the horse has a calm manner, which was well suited for the run in an international campaign. When the race began, Durezza started well from the gate, maintained the pace along the way in third position, lacked acceleration on the ends, and finished in fifth place behind City of Troy. Lemaire, who made his return, said that he moved well at the start but could not maintain the fast pace at the 400-metre mark. Once he was back from England, he was quarantined at the JRA Racing School at Shiroi, Chiba before moving back to Northern Farm to prepare for the autumn season. The horse was scheduled to run in the Japan Cup as his autumn opener with a new jockey, William Buick. Leading up to the race, Ozeki said that Durezza was improving his condition with each workout and confirmed that he was well in shape for the race. The horse proved this statement early as he made a modest break from gate 10. Following that break, Durezza accelerated from mid-pack to lead the race, reaching the uphill climb in the backstretch and was first into the straight. The favourite, Do Deuce, caught and overtook him towards the finish line, but he fought back persistently, which he eventually surrendered in the final strides while caught by the fast-closing Shin Emperor to finish in second place together in a dead heat. In the post-race commentary, Buick praised his ability to maintain the speed in the race and hoped that he would once again challenge the world stage in the future. It was planned for the horse to end his season at the Arima Kinen, but it was cancelled as he suffered a swelling injury in his right foreleg, and sent to rest on the pasture instead.

=== 2025: five-year-old season ===
It would not take long time for Durezza to go for an overseas campaign once again, as he opened this season with a run at the Dubai Sheema Classic in March. For this race, Carrot Farm chose Christophe Soumillon as his jockey. As usual, Ozeki praised his workout form. The workout track was a bit heavy due to the morning dew, but he showed powerful strides regardless. In the race, Durezza jumped off from the gate excellently and led the race pack in second place alongside the front-running Rebel's Romance. At the final straight, he went for the lead and tried to maintain it, but was overtaken by his fellow compatriot, Danon Decile, and an Irish-bred horse, Calandagan, as he finished in third place. Ozeki commented that the horse ran excellently according to his rhythm, while Soumillon said he could win if he timed his final move better, but still praised the horse's overall performance. Three months later, he was scheduled to run at the Takarazuka Kinen. He would be reunited with Yokoyama for this race since two years and two months ago when he rode him at the Yamabuki Sho. Ozeki was relieved as the horse settled down well in the workout and hoped that his overseas experiences might help him this time. Unlike the previous two races, Durezza was starting slow and running in sixth position the most during the race. He was struggling, unable to improve, and falling back to ninth place at the line. Yokoyama explained his struggle after the race, "The trainer's strategy of getting a good start and saving her energy worked well. He settled down, but he tends to lean downwards when running, and since he's not good on this kind of track, he ran out of energy."

In September, Ozeki announced that Durezza would make a comeback at the Kyoto Daishoten, which was held at Kyoto, the place where he won his last race two years ago. The trainer said his workout made his strides lighter than usual and that he was in much better condition. Sticking with Yokoyama this time, he made an early move and secured his position well. Leading up to the homestretch, he was out of legs, failed to extend well, and came home in eighth place. Yokoyama said that the horse was unable to respond well before the race started but somehow managed to handle the pace. He also emphasized that the horse was exhausted in the final straight. Two months later, he was registered to be a participant at the Japan Cup with another new jockey, Alexis Pouchin. Surprisingly, his workout this time was mediocre as Pouchin said that he was not responding well with his instruction and they finished about four lengths behind on the workout track. The bad news piled up on race day as he was scratched just before the race due to inflammation in the inside of his hoof bulb, making him lame. Care was provided for the injury, but his condition was not improving on the morning of the race day. So it was decided that it was better for him to withdraw.

=== 2026: six-year-old season ===
In February, he was registered for the Dubai Sheema Classic for the second time, but the team declined to send him this year. He was proposed to return in August this year at the Niigata Kinen, which was suddenly stacked with the fields of several GI winning horses such as Urban Chic, Cervinia, Stellenbosch and Rodeo Drive in this edition. Carrot Farm announced that his jockey for his first race of the season would be Hironobu Tanabe. In the race, he nailed a good start but could not unleash his final dash due to the weight he carried in the final straight. He finished in sixth place. Tanabe commented that the horse did well enough considering he was off the race track for a long time.

== Racing statistics ==
Below data is based on data available on JBIS Search, netkeiba.com, AtTheRaces, and Emirates Racing Authority.

Date	Track	Race	Grade	Distance (condition)	Entry	HN	Odds (favored)	Finish	Time	Margin	Jockey	Winner (Runner-up)
2022 – two-year-old season
Sep 19	Nakayama	2yo Newcomer		2,000 m (Good)	10	9	1.7 (1)	3rd	2:04.2	0.6	Christophe Lemaire	Nebuleuse
Nov 12	Tokyo	2yo Maiden		2,000 m (Firm)	11	10	2.0 (1)	1st	2:00.9	0.0	Christophe Lemaire	(Satono Glanz)
2023 – three-year-old season
Apr 2	Nakayama	Yamabuki Sho	1 win	2,200 m (Firm)	6	5	1.7 (1)	1st	2:16.3	-0.2	Takeshi Yokoyama	(From Now On)
Jun 4	Tokyo	HKJC Trophy	2 win	2,000 m (Firm)	9	9	1.3 (1)	1st	1:59.2	-0.1	Christophe Lemaire	(General Carrera)
Aug 19	Niigata	Nihonkai Stakes	3 win	2,200 m (Firm)	13	4	2.1 (1)	1st	2:11.4	-0.1	Keita Tosaki	(Red Radiance)
Oct 22	Kyoto	Kikuka-shō	1	3,000 m (Firm)	17	17	7.3 (4)	1st	3:03.1	-0.6	Christophe Lemaire	(Tastiera)
2024 – four-year-old season
Mar 10	Chukyo	Kinko Sho	2	2,000 m (Firm)	13	3	1.9 (1)	2nd	1:58.4	0.8	Christophe Lemaire	Prognosis
Apr 28	Kyoto	Tenno Sho (Spring)	1	3,200 m (Firm)	18	12	2.8 (2)	15th	3:19.8	5.6	Keita Tosaki	T O Royal
Aug 21	York	International Stakes	1	2,063 m (Good)	13	6	28/1 (7)	5th	2:06.08	1.76	Christophe Lemaire	City of Troy
Nov 24	Tokyo	Japan Cup	1	2,400 m (Firm)	14	10	16.2 (7)	2nd (Note: Placed second on a Dead heat with Shin Emperor.)	2:25.5	0.0	William Buick	Do Deuce
2025 – five-year-old season
Apr 5	Meydan	Dubai Sheema Classic	1	2,410 m (Good)	9	6	14.0 (6)	3rd	2:27.49	0.44	Christophe Soumillon	Danon Decile
Jun 15	Hanshin	Takarazuka Kinen	1	2,200 m (Good)	17	2	6.7 (4)	9th	2:12.4	1.3	Takeshi Yokoyama	Meisho Tabaru
Oct 5	Kyoto	Kyoto Daishoten	2	2,400 m (Good)	18	7	5.9 (4)	8th	2:24.5	0.6	Takeshi Yokoyama	Deep Monster
Nov 30	Tokyo	Japan Cup	1	2,400 m (Firm)	18	17	–	Scratched	–	–	Alexis Pouchin	Calandagan
2026 – six-year-old season
Aug 30	Niigata	Niigata Kinen	3	2,000 m (Good)	11	4	9.2 (4)	6th	1:59.9	0.3	Hironobu Tanabe	Zoroastro

Legend:
Turf

== Pedigree ==
Pedigree of Durezza (JPN), seal brown colt, 2020
Sire Duramente b. 2012	King Kamehameha b. 2001	Kingmambo (USA)	Mr. Prospector
Sire Duramente b. 2012	King Kamehameha b. 2001	Kingmambo (USA)	Miesque
Sire Duramente b. 2012	King Kamehameha b. 2001	Manfath (IRE)	Last Tycoon
Sire Duramente b. 2012	King Kamehameha b. 2001	Manfath (IRE)	Pilot Bird (GB)
Sire Duramente b. 2012	Admire Groove b. 2000	Sunday Silence (USA)	Halo
Sire Duramente b. 2012	Admire Groove b. 2000	Sunday Silence (USA)	Wishing Well
Sire Duramente b. 2012	Admire Groove b. 2000	Air Groove	Tony Bin (IRE)
Sire Duramente b. 2012	Admire Groove b. 2000	Air Groove	Dyna Carle
Dam More Than Sacred (AUS) br. 2009	More Than Ready (USA) dk.b. 1997	Southern Halo	Halo
Dam More Than Sacred (AUS) br. 2009	More Than Ready (USA) dk.b. 1997	Southern Halo	Northern Sea
Dam More Than Sacred (AUS) br. 2009	More Than Ready (USA) dk.b. 1997	Woodman's Girl	Woodman
Dam More Than Sacred (AUS) br. 2009	More Than Ready (USA) dk.b. 1997	Woodman's Girl	Becky Be Good
Dam More Than Sacred (AUS) br. 2009	Danalaga b. 2000	Danehill (USA)	Danzig
Dam More Than Sacred (AUS) br. 2009	Danalaga b. 2000	Danehill (USA)	Razyana
Dam More Than Sacred (AUS) br. 2009	Danalaga b. 2000	Tamarino (IRE)	Caerleon (USA)
Dam More Than Sacred (AUS) br. 2009	Danalaga b. 2000	Tamarino (IRE)	Fruition

- Durreza was inbred S4 × M4 to Halo, meaning that this stallion appears twice in the fourth generation in his pedigree, once on the sire side, and once on the dam side.
- His Dam, More Than Sacred, won the New Zealand Oaks.
- Tamarino, who is three generations down his damline, is the half-sister of Northern Spur, who won the 1995 Breeders' Cup Turf.
