= Wind in Her Hair =

Thoroughbred racehorse

Wind In Her Hair
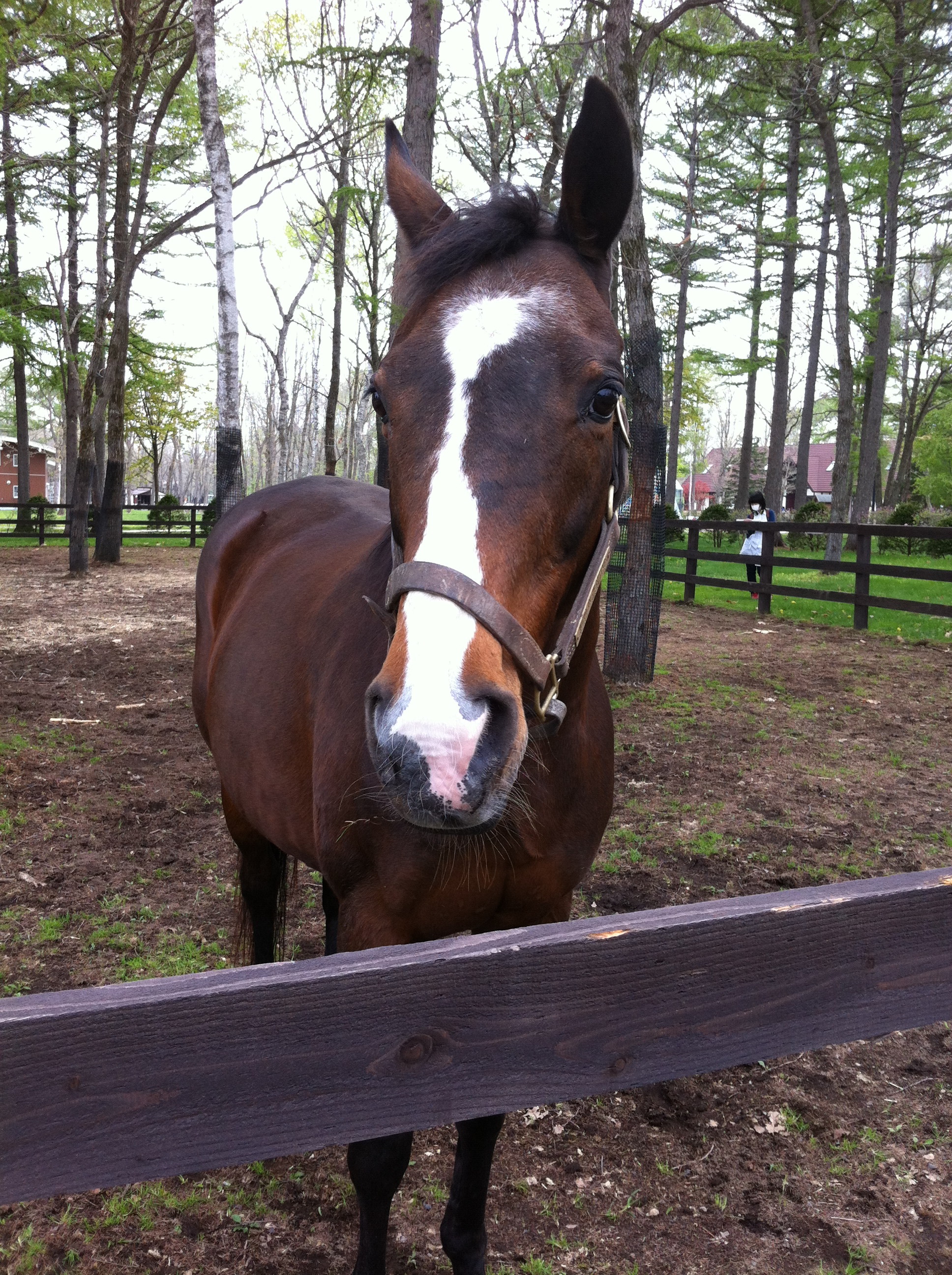
- Wind In Her Hair in 2014
- Breed: Thoroughbred
- Sire: Alzao
- Grandsire: Lyphard
- Dam: Burghclere
- Damsire: Busted
- Sex: Mare
- Foaled: February 20, 1991 (age 35)
- Country: Ireland
- Colour: Bay
- Breeder: Swettenham Stud; Barronstown Stud
- Owner: John W.Hills
- Trainer: Mrs.W.Tulloch; Joint Ownership Terminated
- Record: 13: 3-4-1
- Earnings: 166,969GBP +210,000DM

Major wins
- Aral–Pokal (1995)
- Last updated on 13 November 2025

Wind in Her Hair (foaled February 20, 1991) is an Irish-bred, English-trained racehorse who won the Grade 1 Aral-Pokal in 1995 while pregnant. After retiring from racing, she was retired to become a breeding mare at the Northern Farm in Japan, where she became the dam of Black Tide and Deep Impact, both of whom became successful stallions in their own right.

== Career ==
As a race horse, she came in second behind Balanchine at the 1994 Epsom Oaks, and won the Aral-Pokal in 1995 despite carrying an Arazi foal in her womb. The foal would be born the following year and be named Glint in Her Eye, but because the foal was unable to win any races, she was sold to Japan. It was only after when her second crop, Veil of Avalon, became a successful racehorse, that there was an attempt to buy her back from Japan.

After being shipped to Japan, her crops, such as Deep Impact and Black Tide, as well as Lady Blond who she foaled in the United States have been successful race horses. The four fillies out of Wind in Her Hair that were born in the United States or Europe have all since been imported to Japan. (Note: Glint in Her Eye and Veil of Avalon and Lady Blonde at Northern Farm, and Stars in Her Eyes at Yano Farm)

== Racing statistics ==
Date	Track	Race	Group	Finish	Jockey	Distance	Margin	First (Second) Place	Ref
1993.8.28	Goodwood	Maiden Race		2nd	Darryll Holland	7 furlongs	Neck	Zama	
9.29	Newmarket	Weight For Age		11th	Richard Hills	7 furlongs	3 lengths	Fumo Di Londra	
1994.4.28	Newmarket	Pretty Polly Stakes	Listed	1st	Richard Hills	10 furlongs	1 3/4 lengths	(Wijdan)	
5.13	Newbury	Fillies' Trial Stakes	Listed	1st	Richard Hills	10 furlongs 6 yards	1 1/4 lengths	(Bearall)	
6.4	Epsom	Epsom Oaks	G1	2nd	Richard Hills	12 furlongs 10 yards	2 1/2 lengths	Balanchine	
7.9	Curragh	Irish Oaks	G1	4th	Richard Hills	12 furlongs	5 lengths	Bolas	
7.30	Goodwood	Nassau Stakes	G2	5th	Richard Hills	10 furlongs	7 1/2 lengths	Hawajiss	
9.7	Doncaster	Park Hill Stakes	G3	4th	Richard Hills	14 furlongs 132 yards	7 lengths	Coigach	
1995.5.31	Newbury	Hermitage Stakes		2nd	Richard Hills	10 furlongs 6 yards	3 lengths	Capias	
6.23	Ascot	Hardwicke Stakes	G2	5th	Richard Hills	12 furlongs	11 lengths	Beauchamp Hero	
7.21	Newmarket	Saint Petersburg Stakes		2nd	Richard Hills	12 furlongs	Head	Burroj	
8.6	Gelsenkirchen	Aral-Pokal	G1	1st	Richard Hills	2400 meters	2 lengths	(Lecroix)	
8.16	York	Yorkshire Oaks	G1	3rd	Richard Hills	11 furlongs 195 yards	2 lengths	Pure Grain	

== Breeding records ==
Year	Name	Sex	Color	Sire	Trainer	Owner	Notable Wins and Other Records	Ref
1996	Glint in Her Eye(USA)	Mare	Bay	Arazi	John W. Hills	The Dan Abbott Racing; Partnership		
1997	Veil of Avalon(USA)	Mare	Bay	Thunder Gulch	Bob Baffert	Golden Eagle farm	2002 De La Roce Handicap (G3)	
1998	Lady Blond	Mare	Bay	Seeking the Gold	Kazuo Fujisawa	Lord Horse Club	Granddam of Rey de Oro	
1999	Stars In Her Eyes	Mare	Dark Bay	Woodman	John W.Hills	Mrs David Nagle & Mrs John Magnier		
2000	Like the Wind	Mare	Bay	Danehill	Hiroyoshi Matsuda ↓ Takeshi Nakatsuka	Sunday Racing ↓ Katsumi Yoshida		
2001	Black Tide	Stallion	Dark Bay	Sunday Silence	Yasuo Ikee	Makoto Kaneko	2004 Spring Stakes Sired Kitasan Black and Kamunyak	
2002	Deep Impact	Stallion	Bay	Sunday Silence	Yasuo Ikee	Makoto Kaneko	2005 Japanese Triple Crown of Thoroughbred Racing, 2006 Japan Cup, 2006 Arima Kinen Sired Gentildonna and Contrail	
2003	On Fire	Stallion	Bay	Sunday Silence	Kazuo Fujisawa	Sunday Racing		
2004	New Beginning	Stallion	Bay	Agnes Tachyon	Yasuo Ikee ↓ Naohiro Yoshida	Makoto Kaneko		
2005	Verthandi	Mare	Bay	Agnes Tachyon	Yasuo Ikee	Sunday Racing		
2006	Land's Edge	Mare	Bay	Dance in the Dark	Yasuo Ikee	Sunday Racing	Damline granddam of Regaleira, Stellenbosch, and Urban Chic	
2007	N/A	Filly	Seal Brown	Special Week	-	-	（Died）	
2009	Tosen Laurence	Stallion	Bay	Daiwa Major	Ryuji Okubo	Takaya Shimakawa	(Did not race, pensioned)	
2010	Tosen Soleil	Mare	Bay	Neo Universe	Yasutoshi Ikee	Takaya Shimakawa		
2011	Monde Chat Luna	Stallion	Bay	Neo Universe	Katsuhiko Sumii ↓ Mitsumasa Nakauchida ↓ Hiroo Shimizu	Hidetoshi Yamamoto		
2012	L'Esperance	Mare	Bay	King Kamehameha	Tetsuya Kimura	Silk Racing		

- Wind in Her Hair retired from breeding in 2012 and as of 2023 is being pensioned at the Northern Horse Park in Tomakomai, Hokkaido.

== Pedigree ==
Pedigree of Wind in Her Hair
Sire Alzao 1980 Bay	Lyphard; 1969 Bay	Northern Dancer	Nearctic
Sire Alzao 1980 Bay	Lyphard; 1969 Bay	Northern Dancer	Natalma
Sire Alzao 1980 Bay	Lyphard; 1969 Bay	Goofed	Court Martial
Sire Alzao 1980 Bay	Lyphard; 1969 Bay	Goofed	Barra
Sire Alzao 1980 Bay	Lady Rebecca; 1971 Bay	Sir Ivor	Sir Gaylord
Sire Alzao 1980 Bay	Lady Rebecca; 1971 Bay	Sir Ivor	Attica
Sire Alzao 1980 Bay	Lady Rebecca; 1971 Bay	Pocahontas	Roman
Sire Alzao 1980 Bay	Lady Rebecca; 1971 Bay	Pocahontas	How
Dam Burghclere 1977 Bay	Busted; 1963 Bay	Crepello	Donatello
Dam Burghclere 1977 Bay	Busted; 1963 Bay	Crepello	Crepuscule
Dam Burghclere 1977 Bay	Busted; 1963 Bay	Sans le sou	Vimy
Dam Burghclere 1977 Bay	Busted; 1963 Bay	Sans le sou	Martial Loan
Dam Burghclere 1977 Bay	Highclere; 1971 Bay	Queen's Hussar	March Past
Dam Burghclere 1977 Bay	Highclere; 1971 Bay	Queen's Hussar	Jojo
Dam Burghclere 1977 Bay	Highclere; 1971 Bay	Highlight	Borealis
Dam Burghclere 1977 Bay	Highclere; 1971 Bay	Highlight	Hypericum
