= Christophe Lemaire =

French jockey (born 1979)

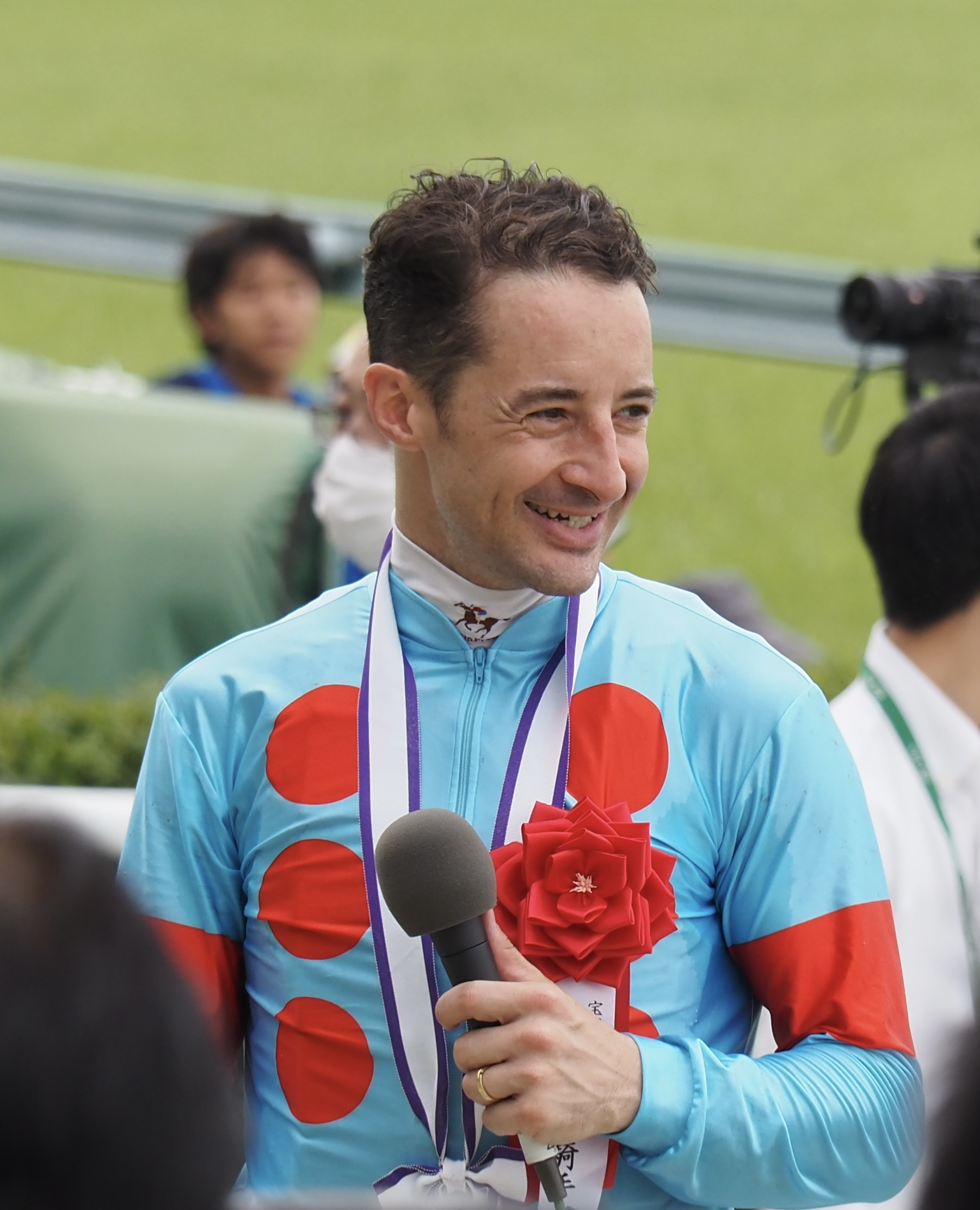
- Lemaire in 2023 (Takarazuka Kinen)

Personal information
- Born: 20 May 1979 (age 47) Gouvieux, France
- Occupation: Jockey

Horse racing career
- Sport: Horse racing
- Career wins: 2000+ (Japan); 718 (France)

Racing awards
- JRA Award for Best Jockey (races won) (2017-2021, 2023); JRA Award for Best Jockey (winning average) (2015, 2016, 2018); JRA Award for Best Jockey (money earned) (2016-2021, 2023); Most Valuable Jockey (2017-2021); JRA Grand Prize Jockey (2018)

Significant horses
- Pride, Heart's Cry, Divine Proportions, Makfi, Satono Diamond, Major Emblem, Soul Stirring, Fierement, Almond Eye, Gran Alegria, Schnell Meister, Equinox, Costa Nova, Durezza, Cervinia, Urban Chic, Masquerade Ball, Energico, Embroidery

Christophe-Patrice Lemaire (Japanese:クリストフ・ルメール (Kurisutofu Rumēru), born 20 May 1979) is a French jockey. He has enjoyed much of his success on the Japanese flat racing circuit, with the most wins at Japan Racing Association racetracks for five consecutive years since 2017.

== Career ==
Lemaire began racing in 1999, after he obtained the license required for a French jockey. From there he became seventh leading jockey in 2003 and won the French Group 1 Grand Prix de Paris in the same year.

In 2002 he also began racing in Japan Racing Association races using the 3-month short-term licence (短期免許, tanki menkyo) system, taking part mainly at local racecourses such as Chukyo Racecourse and Kokura Racecourse. Within a few years he had already placed in Japan's major Grade 1 stakes races, finishing second in the 2004 Autumn Tenno Sho on Dance in the Mood, second in the 2004 Japan Cup on Cosmo Bulk, and second in the 2005 Mile Championship on Daiwa Major.

Lemaire secured his first Japanese graded stakes victory, and first Japanese Grade 1 win, aboard Heart's Cry in the 2005 Arima Kinen. The victory broke the winning streak of Triple Crown winner and eventual Horse of the Year Deep Impact. It was also the fourth straight year that a foreign jockey won the Arima Kinen, following three consecutive wins by Olivier Peslier.

In 2006 he rode Heart's Cry to victory in the Dubai Sheema Classic. He also rode Pride in the Grand Prix de Saint-Cloud, beating the favourite, Hurricane Run.

In 2008 he rode the winner of Britain's second classic of the year, the 1,000 Guineas, aboard the Pascal Bary-trained Natagora.

In September 2009, he was chosen by the Aga Khan as first jockey.

He won the 2011 Melbourne Cup in a photo-finish riding Dunaden.

Lemaire became a full-time JRA jockey with Italian jockey Mirco Demuro in February 2015. He was scheduled to start riding in Japan in March of that year, which would have been his first time in Japan after a demotion at Kyoto Racecourse in November 2014. However, he was suspended by stewards of the Japan Racing Association (JRA) for 30 days after he used Twitter the night before he was scheduled to participate in races at Hanshin Racecourse. JRA regulations bar any outside contact by jockeys from 9 PM the night before racing until after they have ridden in their final race of the day. After he served his suspension, Lemaire marked his first victory as a JRA jockey on April 6 with a graded race victory at the Osaka Hai.

In 2017, he became the first foreigner to be Japan's leading jockey, winning 199 JRA races in the year. In 2018, he won Yushun Himba for the second time, on his 39th birthday. In October 2018, he rode Almond Eye to her victory at the Japan Fillies Triple Crown and won the championship for the second consecutive year, breaking Yutaka Take's long standing record for wins in a year in Japan (215 wins vs 212).

In 2019, he retained his title in Japan for the third consecutive year, winning 5 G1 races as well as the Dubai Turf, the first international G1 win of Almond Eye. In 2020, he again won the championship–for the 4th consecutive time–by winning a total of 204 races in JRA including 8 G1. He also established a new record of consecutive wins at the Emperor's cup (Tenno Sho Autumn) by winning this bi-annual race (spring and autumn) for the fifth consecutive time. This meant that Almond Eye became the Japanese horse with the most G1 wins (8 in Japan and 1 international). At the end of the 2020 season, Lemaire was ranked number 1 in the world, according to the TRC Global Jockey Ranking, taking the lead from Frankie Dettori before retaining his title, for the 5th consecutive year in 2021. In 2022, despite major wins at the Tenno Sho (Autumn) and the Arima Kinen, he lost his title. 2023 saw his come-back to the highest rank of horse racing in Japan: not only did he win the JRA championship but also broke the record in terms of prize money. This year was also marked by the remarkable achievement of Equinox, named worldwide horse of the year by Longines, and with whom Christophe Lemaire won 4 major G1 races.

Early 2022, in parallel to his racing career, he also co-founded the fashion label CL by C.ルメール.

Lemaire was injured in a fall during the stretch run of the Dubai Turf on March 30, 2024 at Meydan Racecourse in Dubai, breaking his clavicle and fracturing a rib. Stars on Earth and Derma Sotogake, who Lemaire was scheduled to ride that night at the Dubai Sheema Classic and Dubai World Cup, respectively, were instead each ridden by Frankie Dettori and Oisin Murphy. He made a comeback about a month later in Japan, achieved his highest-ever success rate in Japan (29.8% for the year 2024), secured three G1 titles in Japan, a second place in Breeders' Cup Turf with Rousham Park, and claimed his seventh leading jockey title with a record of 176 victories from 590 mounts.

== Major wins ==
Australia

- Melbourne Cup - (1) - Dunaden (2011)

France

- Grand Prix de Paris - (1) - Vespone (2003)
- Grand Prix de Saint-Cloud - (2) - Pride (2006), Sarafina (2011)
- Poule d'Essai des Pouliches - (3) - Divine Proportions (2005), Elusive Wave (2009), Flotilla (2013)
- Prix d'Astarté - (1) - Divine Proportions (2005)
- Prix de Diane - (3) - Divine Proportions (2005), Stacelita (2009), Sarafina (2010)
- Prix d'Ispahan - (1) - Never on Sunday (2009)
- Prix Jean Prat - (1) - Vespone (2003)
- Prix du Jockey Club - (1) - Le Havre (2009)
- Prix Marcel Boussac - (2) - Denebola (2003), Divine Proportions (2004)
- Prix Morny - (1) - Divine Proportions (2004)
- Prix du Moulin de Longchamp - (1) - Starcraft (2005)
- Prix de l'Opéra - (1) - Ridasiyna (2012)
- Prix Royal-Oak - (1) - Gentoo (2010)
- Prix Saint-Alary - (4) - Coquerelle (2007), Belle et Celebre (2008), Stacelita (2009), Sagawara (2012)
- Prix Vermeille - (2) - Stacelita (2009), Shareta (2012)

Great Britain

- 1,000 Guineas - (1) - Natagora (2008)
- 2,000 Guineas - (1) - Makfi (2010)
- Champion Stakes - (2) - Pride (2006), Literato (2007)
- Cheveley Park Stakes - (1) - Natagora (2007)
- King's Stand Stakes - (1) - Chineur (2005)
- Queen Elizabeth II Stakes - (1) - Starcraft (2005)
- Sun Chariot Stakes - (1) - Sahpresa (2011)
- Yorkshire Oaks - (1) - Shareta (2012)

Hong Kong

- Hong Kong Cup - (1) - Pride (2006)

Japan (the JRA)

- Arima Kinen - (3) - Heart's Cry (2005), Satono Diamond (2016), Equinox (2022)
- Queen Elizabeth II Commemorative Cup - (3) - Little Amapola (2008), Lucky Lilac (2020), Brede Weg (2023)
- Champions Cup (former Japan Cup Dirt) - (2) - Kane Hekili (2008), Belshazzar (2013)
- Japan Cup - (4) - Vodka (2009), Almond Eye (2018, 2020), Equinox (2023)
- Hanshin Juvenile Fillies - (2) - Major Emblem (2015), Soul Stirring (2016)
- NHK Mile Cup - (2) - Major Emblem (2016), Schnell Meister (2021)
- Kikuka-shō - (5) - Satono Diamond (2016), Fierement (2018), Durezza (2023), Urban Chic (2024), Energico (2025)
- Victoria Mile - (4) - Admire Lead (2017), Almond Eye (2020), Gran Alegria (2021), Ascoli Piceno (2025), Embroidery (2026)
- Tokyo Yūshun - (1) - Rey de Oro (2017)
- Yushun Himba - (4) - Soul Stirring (2017), Almond Eye (2018), Stars On Earth (2022), Cervinia (2024)
- Shuka Sho - (4) - Deirdre (2017), Almond Eye (2018), Cervinia (2024), Embroidery (2025)
- Oka Sho - (2) - Almond Eye (2018), Gran Alegria (2019)
- Yasuda Kinen - (1) - Mozu Ascot (2018)
- Tenno Sho (Autumn) - (6) - Rey de Oro (2018), Almond Eye (2019, 2020), Equinox (2022, 2023), Masquerade Ball (2025)
- Japan Breeding farms' Cup Sprint (held by the JRA) - (1) - Graceful Leap (2018)
- Satsuki Sho - (1) - Saturnalia (2019)
- Tenno Sho (Spring) - (3) - Fierement (2019, 2020), Justin Palace (2023)
- February Stakes - (3) - Mozu Ascot (2020), Cafe Pharoah (2021), Costa Nova (2026)
- Sprinters Stakes - (2) - Tower of London (2019), Gran Alegria (2020)
- Mile Championship - (1) - Gran Alegria (2020)
- Takarazuka Kinen - (2) - Chrono Genesis (2021), Equinox (2023)
- Hopeful Stakes - (2) - Rey de Oro (2016), Regaleira (2023)
- Takamatsunomiya Kinen - (1) - Satono Reve (2026)

Japan (the NAR)

- Kawasaki Kinen - (3) - Vermilion (2007), Kane Hekili (2008), All Blush (2017)
- Tokyo Daishōten - (1) - Kane Hekili (2008)
- Japan Dirt Derby - (1) - Nonkono Yume (2015)
- Kashiwa Kinen - (2) - Gold Dream (2018, 2019)
- Teio Sho - (2) - Gold Dream (2018), Mikki Fight (2025)
- JBC Classic - (1) - Mikki Fight (2025)

United Arab Emirates

- Dubai Sheema Classic - (2) - Heart's Cry (2006), Equinox (2023)
- Dubai Turf - (1) - Almond Eye (2019)

United States

- Breeders' Cup Juvenile Fillies Turf - (1) - Flotilla (2012)
- Secretariat Stakes - (1) - Bayrir (2012)

=== Year-end charts in the United States ===
| Chart (2006–present) | Peak position |
|---|---|
| National Earnings List for Jockeys 2006 | 92 |

== Bibliography ==
- Demuro, Mirco; Lemaire, Christophe (2016). ミルコ・デムーロ×クリストフ・ルメール勝利の条件 (in Japanese). KADOKAWA. ISBN 9784046013941. OCLC 952391726.
