= Shirasagi Stakes =

Japanese thoroughbred race

Shirasagi Stakes しらさぎステークス
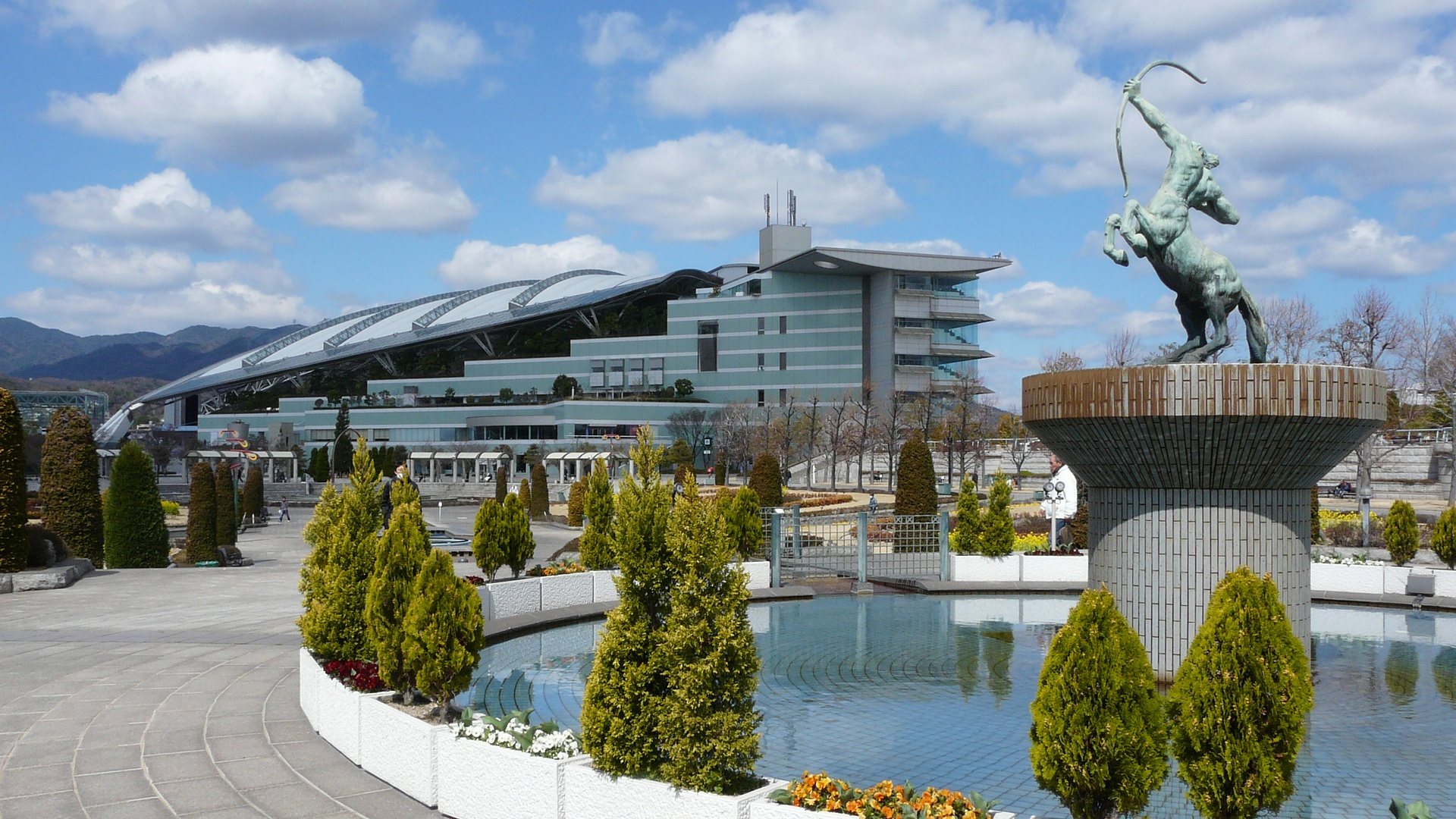
- Hanshin Racecourse
- Class: Grade 3
- Location: Hanshin Racecourse
- Inaugurated: 2000
- Race type: Thoroughbred Flat racing

Race information
- Distance: 1,600 meters
- Surface: Turf
- Track: Right-handed
- Qualification: 3-y-o +
- Weight: Handicap
- Purse: ¥ 87,960,000 (as of 2025): 1st: ¥ 41,000,000; 2nd: ¥ 16,000,000; 3rd: ¥ 10,000,000

The Shirasagi Stakes (Japanese しらさぎステークス) is a Grade 3 horse race for Thoroughbred horses aged three and over run in June each year. Organized by Japan Racing Association, it is run over a distance of 1,600 meters at Hanshin Racecourse, in Takarazuka, Hyogo, Japan.

The race was first established in 2000 as Yonago Stakes and was promoted to Listed level in 2019. In 2025, the race will be promoted to Grade 3 status and renamed to Shirasagi Stakes.

== Winners ==
Year	Winner	Age	Jockey	Trainer	Owner	Time
2000	Checkmate	5	Yutaka Take	Kenji Yamauchi	Tomiro Fukami	1:34.0
2001	Eishin Preston	4	Yuichi Fukunaga	Shuji Kitahashi	Toyomitsu Hirai	1:34.8
2002	Top Protector	5	Kenichi Ikezoe	Ichizo Iwamoto	U. Miyauchi Bokujo	1:35.4
2003	Kitasan Channel	5	Koshiro Take	Kojiro Hashiguchi	Ono Shoji	1:35.1
2004	Chapel Concert	5	Kunihiko Watanabe	Yasuo Ikee	Sunday Racing Co. Ltd.	1:34.3
2005	Admire Hope	4	Junichi Serizawa	Mitsuru Hashida	Riichi Kondo	1:36.5
2006	Wadi Rum	5	Jun Takada	Hiroyoshi Matsuda	Shadai Race Horse Co. Ltd.	1:34.6
2007	Tosho Courage	5	Keisuke Dazai	Kaneo Ikezoe	Tosho Sangyo	1:32.7
2008	Fusaichi Auster	6	Kotaro Akagi	Yasutoshi Ikee	Makio Okada	1:33.0
2009	Crown Princess	5	Keisuke Dazai	Kojiro Hashiguchi	Hiroyoshi Usuda	1:32.6
2010	Tamamo Nice Play	5	Kunihiko Watanabe	Katsumi Minai	Tamamo Co. Ltd.	1:33.8
2011	Ridill	4	Futoshi Komaki	Kojiro Hashiguchi	Koji Maeda	1:33.3
2012	Fragarach	5	Ryo Takakura	Mikio Matsunaga	Carrot Farm Co. Ltd.	1:34.1
2013	A Shin Missouri	5	Keisuke Dazai	Masanori Sakaguchi	Eishindo Co. Ltd.	1:33.1
2014	Sunrise Major	5	Yuichi Fukunaga	Tamio Hamada	Takao Matsuoka	1:34.8
2015	Smart Layer	5	Mirco Demuro	Ryuji Okubo	Toru Okawa	1:34.0
2016	Kento O	4	Ryuji Wada	Toyoji Nishihashi	Tomiko Tabata	1:34.6
2017	Black Moon	5	Mirco Demuro	Katsuichi Nishiura	Him Rock Racing Holdings Co. Ltd.	1:31.9
2018	Besten Dank	6	Katsuma Sameshima	Akio Adachi	Ichikawa Yoshimi Holdings Co. Ltd.	1:31.9
2019	All for Love	4	Ryuji Wada	Mitsumasa Nakauchida	Lord Horse Club Co. Ltd.	1:34.7
2020	Smile Kana	3	Daichi Shibata	Yoshiyasu Takahashi	Big Red Farm	1:32.7
2021	Lotus Land	4	Mirai Iwata	Yasuyuki Tsujino	Kobayashi Eiichi Holdings LLC.	1:35.0
2022	Win Carnelian	5	Kousei Miura	Yuichi Shikato	Win Co. Ltd.	1:32.9
2023	Meisho Shintake	5	Atsuya Nishimura	Teruhiko Chida	Yoshio Matsumoto	1:31.7
2024	Tudo de Bom	5	Kohei Matsuyama	Hirofumi Shii	Yoichi Aoyama	1:31.5
2025	Keep Calm	4	Ryusei Sakai	Kazuya Nakatake	Shinji Maeda	1:33.0
2026	Elton Barows	6	Fuma Matsuwaka	Haruka Sugiyama	Hirotsugu Inokuma	1:33.2

== See also ==
- Horse racing in Japan
- List of Japanese flat horse races
