= Contrail (horse) =

Japanese Thoroughbred racehorse

Contrail コントレイル
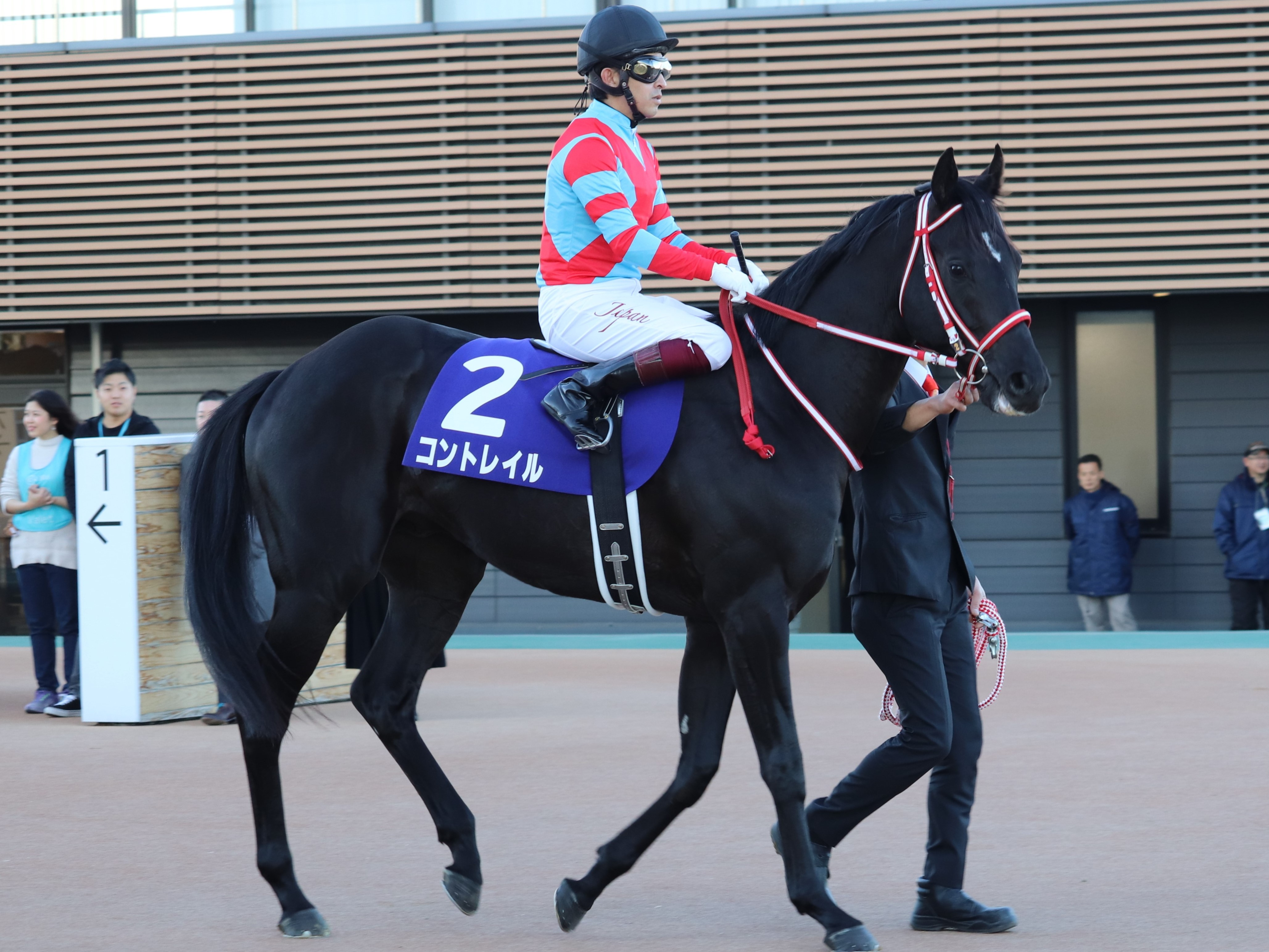
- Contrail at the 2019 Hopeful Stakes.
- Breed: Thoroughbred
- Sire: Deep Impact (JPN)
- Grandsire: Sunday Silence (USA)
- Dam: Rhodochrosite (USA)
- Damsire: Unbridled's Song (USA)
- Sex: Stallion
- Foaled: April 1, 2017 (age 9)
- Country: Japan
- Colour: Brown
- Breeder: North Hills Co Ltd
- Owner: Shinji Maeda
- Racing colours
- Trainer: Yoshito Yahagi
- Jockey: Yuichi Fukunaga
- Record: 11: 8-2-1
- Earnings: ¥1,195,294,000

Major wins
- Tokyo Sports Hai Nisai Stakes (2019); Hopeful Stakes (2019); Kobe Shimbun Hai (2020); Japan Cup (2021); Japanese Classic Race wins: Satsuki Sho (2020); Tokyo Yushun (2020); Kikuka Sho (2020)

Awards
- 8th Japanese Triple Crown Champion; JRA Award for Best Two-Year-Old Colt (2019); JRA Award for Best Three-Year-Old Colt (2020); JRA Award for Best Older Male Horse (2021)

Honours
- Japan Racing Association Hall of Fame (2024); Timeform rating: 127
- Last updated on June 4, 2024

Contrail (Japanese: コントレイル, Hepburn: Kontoreiru; foaled 1 April 2017) is a retired champion Japanese Thoroughbred racehorse and active breeding sire who became the eighth colt to win the Japanese Triple Crown in 2020. He was one of the leading two-year-olds in Japan in 2019 when he was undefeated in three races including the Tokyo Sports Hai Nisai Stakes and Hopeful Stakes. In 2020 he maintained his unbeaten record with wins in the Satsuki Sho, Tokyo Yushun and Kobe Shimbun Hai before completing the Japan Triple Crown with a victory in the Kikuka Sho. Additionally, he won the 2021 Japan Cup in his final race, having come second to Almond Eye the previous year.

== Background ==
Contrail is a brown horse with a white star bred in Japan by North Hills Co Ltd. He races in the colours of North Hills' owner Shinji Maeda and was sent into training with Yoshito Yahagi. He is a relatively small male Thoroughbred weighing no more than 460 kg during his racing career.

He was from the ninth crop of foals sired by Deep Impact, who was the Japanese Horse of the Year in 2005 and 2006, winning races including the Tokyo Yushun, Tenno Sho, Arima Kinen and Japan Cup. Deep Impact's other progeny include Gentildonna, Harp Star, Kizuna, A Shin Hikari, Marialite and Saxon Warrior.

Contrail's dam Rhodochrosite was bred in Kentucky but exported to Japan after being sold for $385,000 at the Keeneland Association Yearling Sale in September 2011. She showed little racing ability in her new country, failing to win in seven attempts. Her dam Folklore was a top-class performer in the United States, winning the Breeders' Cup Juvenile Fillies in 2005 and was a female-line descendant of the broodmare Stolen Base (foaled 1967), making her a distant relative of Smarty Jones.

== Racing career ==
=== 2019: two-year-old season ===
Contrail made his racecourse debut in a contest for previously unraced juveniles over 1800 metres at Hanshin Racecourse on 15 September and won from the filly Frevo and seven others. On 16 November the colt was stepped up in class for the Grade 3 Tokyo Sports Hai Nisai Stakes over 1800 metres at Tokyo Racecourse in which he was ridden by Ryan Moore and started the 1.5/1 favourite in an eight-runner field. After racing in fifth place he moved forward on the outside approaching the final turn, took the lead 400 metres from the finish and drew away to win by five lengths from Al Jannah. His winning time of 1:44.5 was a new record for the race.

Contrail was moved up to the highest class and started favourite for the Hopeful Stakes over 2000 metres at Nakayama Racecourse on 28 December when he was ridden by Yuichi Fukunaga. His twelve opponents included Wakea (winner of the Ivy Stakes), Weltreisende, Authority (Fuyo Stakes) and Black Hole (Sapporo Nisai Stakes). After settling in fourth place behind the outsiders Panthalassa, Blooming Sky and Rhineback, Contrail moved up on the final turn, took the lead 200 metres from the finish and won "effortlessly" by one and a half lengths from Weltreisende. After the race Fukunaga said "He was really strong. I didn't have to do anything but just sit on him... I was confident that we could make it through to the end. He does tend to be a little keen but the training staff had conditioned him to be in a good motivated mood so it worked well in the race. He really changed his gear effortlessly but did [look] a little lost once up front... the colt really showed his potential towards his three-year-old campaign next year."

In January 2020, at the JRA Awards for 2019, Contrail was named Best Two-Year-Old Colt, beating Salios by 197 votes to 77. In the official Japanese rankings however, Salios was rated the best two-year-old of 2019, one pound ahead of Contrail.

=== 2020: three-year-old season ===
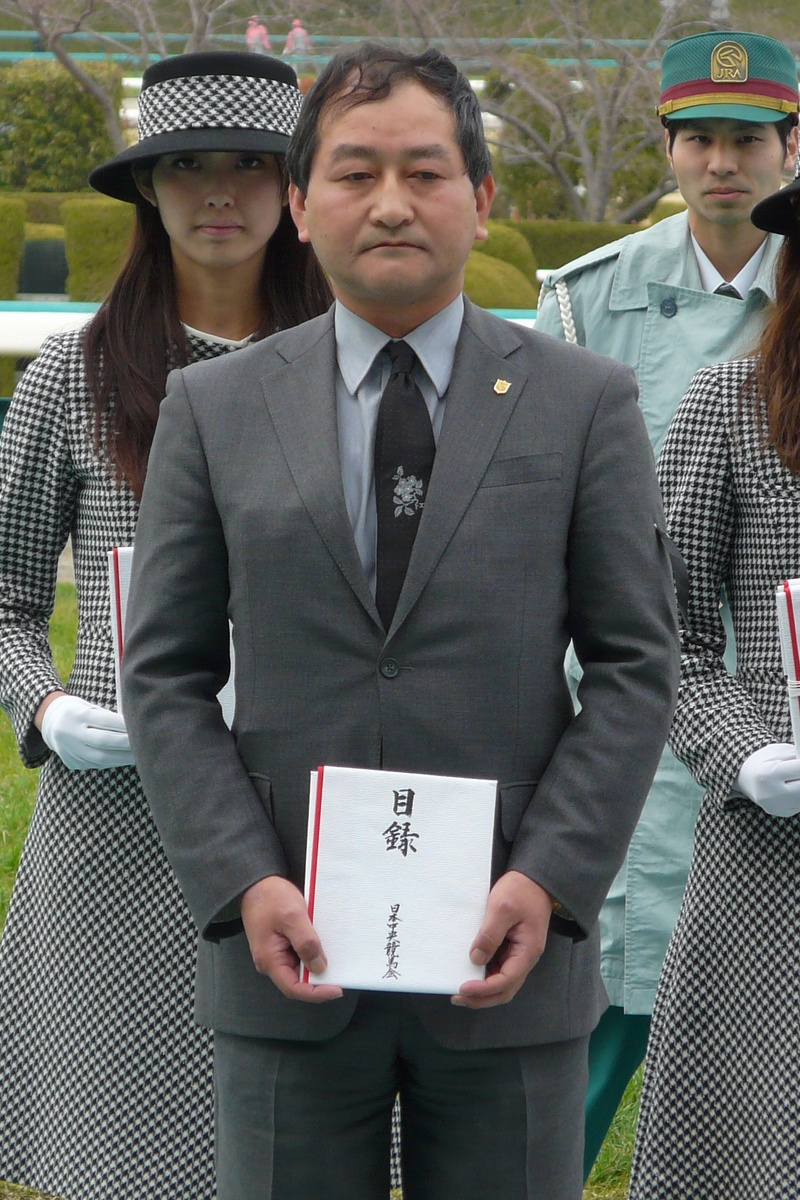
Contrail's trainer Yoshito Yahagi

Contrail did not contest any trial races in the early spring of 2020 and made his three-year-old debut in the 80th running of the Satsuki Sho over 2000 metres at Nakayama on 19 April. Ridden by Fukunaga he started the 17/10 favourite ahead of Satono Flag (Yayoi Sho) and Salios in an eighteen-runner field which also included Weltreisende, Black Hole, Crystal Black (Keisei Stakes), Darlington Hall (Tokinominoru Kinen), My Rhapsody (Kyoto Nisai Stakes), Galore Creek (Spring Stakes) and Cortesia (Kisaragi Sho). The favourite raced towards the rear of the field on the inside rail as Chimera Verite set the pace, before switching to the outside as the runners approached the final turn. He produced strong late run, got the better of a sustained struggle with Salios and won by half a length, with three and a half lengths back to Galore Creek in third. After the race Fukunaga said "The race itself wasn't the way as I had expected... he wasn't keen to go up front early and I didn't push him so we were positioned much farther behind going around the second corner... but with the way he was moving in the post parade and the response once I took him to the outside, I had every confidence in him entering the stretch. His power was so that I thought we might pull away but Salios didn't let us win so easily. Winning the way he did today, I am confident that he has every reason to handle the extended distance in the Tokyo Yushun".

On 31 May Contrail was stepped up in distance to contest the 87th edition of the Tokyo Yushun over 2400 Metres at Tokyo and headed the betting at odds of 2/5. Salios was the second choice while the other sixteen runners included Wakea, Satono Flag, Darlington Hall, Galore Creek, Deep Bond (Kyoto Shimbun Hai), Satono Impresa (Mainichi Hai), Weltreisende, My Rhapsody, Cortesia and Black Hole. Contrail raced in third place as Win Carnelian set a steady pace before My Rhapsody rushed up on the outside to take the lead at half way. The favourite exited the final turn in fourth place, made rapid progress down the centre of the straight, took the lead 200 metres from the finish and drew away in the closing stages to come home three lengths clear of Salios. Fukunaga commented "I was just focusing on finishing this race on a high note and although he still has room for improvement— he tends to lose his focus when he's leading— he still is able to win like he did today, so he's got great potential and there's a lot to look forward to in this colt".

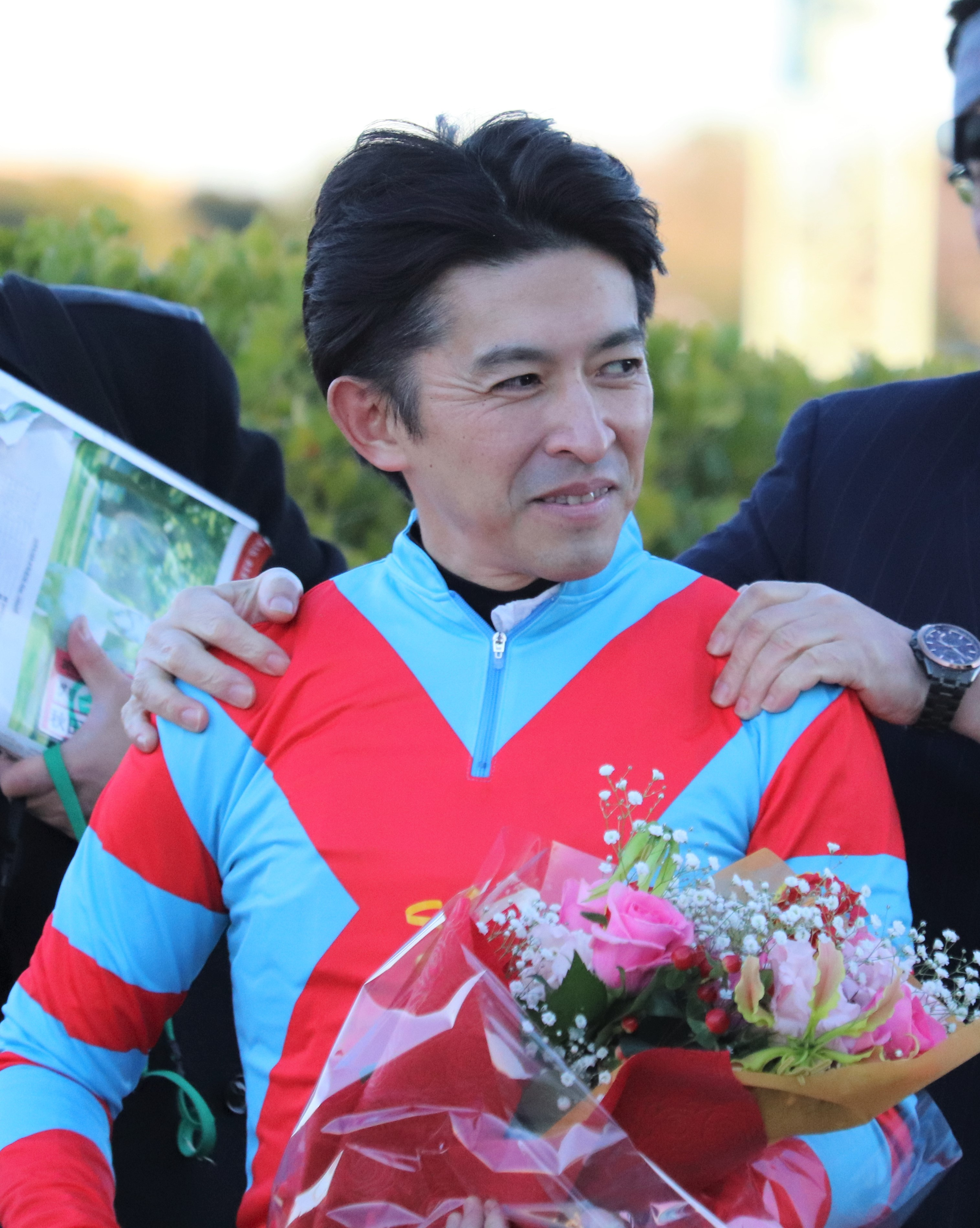
Contrail's regular jockey Yuichi Fukunaga

After the summer break Contrail returned to the track in the Grade 2 Kobe Shimbun Hai over 2200 metres at Chukyo Racecourse on 27 September and started the 1/10 favourite in a field of eighteen. He raced in mid division before taking the lead in the straight and broke clear to win by two lengths from Weltreisende. His assistant trainer Yusaku Oka subsequently commented "It was a good win... he were relieved by that". Four weeks later at Kyoto Racecourse the colt was stepped up in distance and attempted to complete the Japanese Triple Crown in the 3000 metre Kikuka Sho in which he was ridden as usual by Fukunaga. He was again made the 1/10 favourite, with the best-fancied of the other seventeen contenders being Weltreisende, Babbitt (St Lite Kinen), Aristoteles, Satono Flag, Valcos and Deep Bond. After settling behind the leaders as the outsider Chimera Verite set a steady pace, the favourite moved up on the outside approaching the straight and gained the advantage 300 metres from the finish. Contrail was strongly challenged by Aristoteles but kept on well to prevail by a neck with the pair finishing well clear of Satono Flag in third place. After the race Fukunaga commented "I can't say that I was successful in keeping him relaxed during the race with so much pressure from Aristoteles. It turned out to be a tough race for us with Aristoteles looking quite strong and persistent, and this race may not have been his best performance, but I kept my faith in Contrail and he certainly showed how strong he is". He became only the third colt after Deep Impact and Symboli Rudolf to complete the Triple Crown while still undefeated.

On November 29, Contrail was matched against older horses for the first time when he started second favourite for the 40th edition of the Japan Cup over 2400 metres at Tokyo. He settled in mid-division before launching a strong late challenge down the centre of the straight but failed to catch the favoured Almond Eye and sustained his first defeat as he was beaten one and a quarter lengths into second place. The 2020 Japanese Fillies Triple Crown winner Daring Tact finished third, while the other runners included Glory Vase, World Premiere, Kiseki and Makahiki. Fukunaga commented about Contrail that "He never gave up but Almond Eye was strong. The result was regrettable, but his condition was good and he showed his ability."

In January 2021 Contrail was unanimously voted Best Three-Year-Old Colt at the JRA Awards for 2020. In the 2020 World's Best Racehorse Rankings, Contrail was rated on 124, making him the equal tenth best racehorse in the world and the best three-year-old over long distances.

=== 2021: four-year old season ===
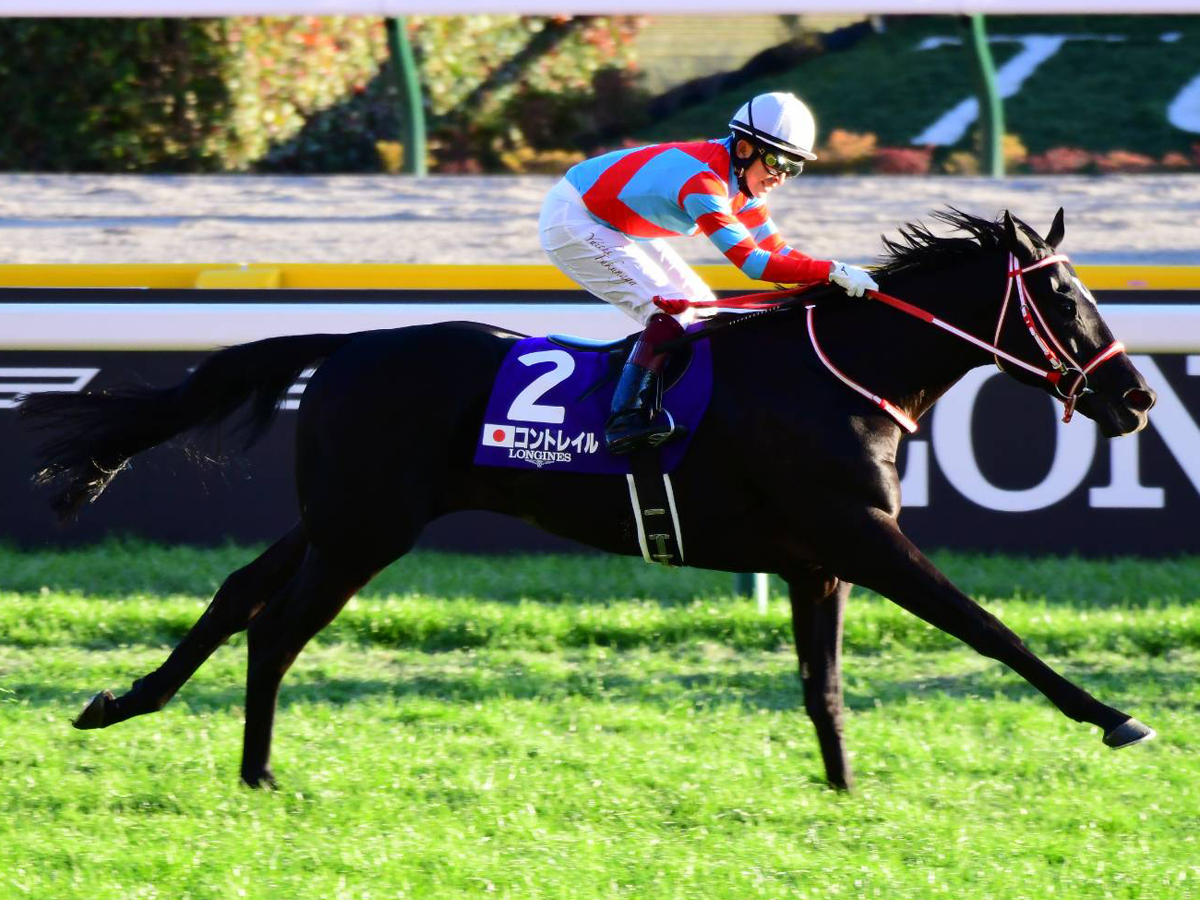
Contrail at the 2021 Japan Cup

On April 4, Contrail started the season off with the Grade I Ōsaka Hai. In that race, he was the most favored to win, with his opponents including the likes of Gran Alegria, who won the JRA Award for Best Sprinter or Miler the previous year but never ran a race of medium distance up until that point; Salios, whom Contrail had beaten twice before; and the undefeated Lei Papale, who was running a Grade I race for the first time. However, the race, which was held on a soft track due to the rain, saw Contrail struggle to catch up from the mid-field position; before ultimately finishing third behind Lei Papale and Mozu Bello.

After the Ōsaka Hai, the horse was initially planned to race the Takarazuka Kinen, only to skip the race to head to the Autumn Tennō Shō later that year as the horse's condition was not sufficiently recovering.

On October 31, Contrail was entered to contest the Autumn Tennō Shō held at Tokyo Racecourse. In that race, he was unable to make a good start, having to pace behind Gran Alegria and Efforia for most of the race. On the final stretch, Contrail managed to pass Gran Alegria, but failed to catch up to Efforia, who won by a length against Contrail.

On November 28, Contrail was entered to run the Japan Cup once again, this time having been announced prior that the horse would retire after this race. The race saw four Tokyo Yushun winners enter the race for the first time, Contrail, Makahiki, Wagnerian, and Shahryar; who was that year's Derby winner that beat Efforia in that race. During the race, Aristoteles was the front runner while Contrail ran in the middle of the pack, before Kiseki took over the lead at the third corner. Kiseki came in the final stretch with a four length lead but Authority, Shahryar, and Contrail closed in before Contrail took over the lead, finishing his final race with a two length lead.

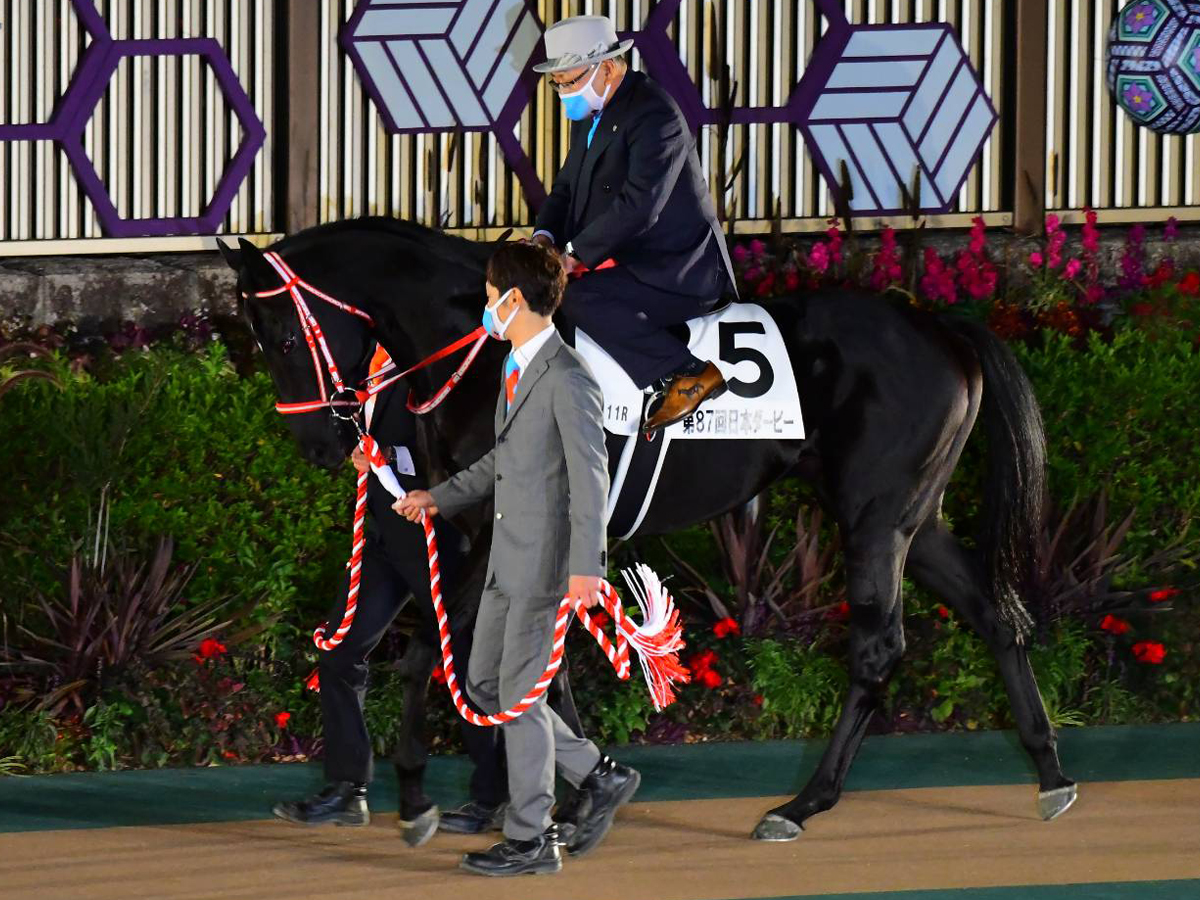
Contrail's retirement ceremony, with Yahagi riding the horse

Following the Japan Cup, a retirement ceremony for the horse was held at the parade ring of the Tokyo Racecourse. During the ceremony, Fukunaga thanked the horse, saying "I believe that we were able to achieve the Triple Crown with the breeder, trainer, and jockey forming a trinity; and the fact that Contrail was able to accomplish that makes him such a talented horse. As a jockey, I was able to experience something that a horse man could hardly achieve. That I am very grateful for. I also believe that Contrail is the only horse that can continue the trend of 'an undefeated Triple Crown winner born out of another undefeated Triple Crown winner', and I hope that some day this horse could send such a horse to the tracks." Meanwhile, Yahagi commented "It was a battle against pressure, but it was a fun two years. This is the first time I rode the horse myself, but it felt as if I was flying. I believe his offsprings will do so too. I'd like to win the Prix de l'Arc de Triomphe with one of his progenies some day."

In January 2022, Contrail was awarded the JRA Award for Best Older Male Horse, although he lost the Japanese Horse of the Year to Efforia. In addition, Contrail was given a rating of 126 and ranked fifth in the 2021 World's Best Racehorse Rankings, while the JRA gave the same rating on their JPN Thoroughbred Ranking, with Contrail given the highest rating of all older horses.

Contrail was inducted into the Japan Racing Association Hall of Fame in 2024.

== Racing form ==
The following form is based on information available on netkeiba.com and JBIS-Search.

Date	Track	Race	Grade	Distance (Condition)	Entry	HN	Odds (Favored)	Finish	Time	Margins	Jockey	Winner (Runner-up)
2019 – two-year-old season
Sept 15	Hanshin	2YO Newcomer		1,800 m (Firm)	9	9	1.7 (1st)	1st	1:48.9	-0.4	Yuichi Fukunaga	(Frevo)
Nov 16	Tokyo	Tokyo Sports Hai Nisai Stakes	3	1,800 m (Firm)	8	6	2.5 (1st)	1st	R1:44.5	-0.8	Ryan Moore	(Al Jannah)
Dec 28	Nakayama	Hopeful Stakes	1	2,000 m (Firm)	13	2	2.0 (1st)	1st	2:01.4	-0.2	Yuichi Fukunaga	(Weltreisende)
2020 – three-year-old season
Apr 19	Nakayama	Satsuki Sho	1	2,000 m (Good)	18	1	2.7 (1st)	1st	2:00.7	-0.1	Yuichi Fukunaga	(Salios)
May 31	Tokyo	Tokyo Yushun	1	2,400 m (Firm)	18	5	1.4 (1st)	1st	2:24.1	-0.5	Yuichi Fukunaga	(Salios)
Sept 27	Chukyo	Kobe Shimbun Hai	2	2,200 m (Firm)	18	2	1.1 (1st)	1st	2:12.5	-0.3	Yuichi Fukunaga	(Weltreisende)
Oct 25	Kyoto	Kikuka-shō	1	3,000 m (Firm)	18	2	1.1 (1st)	1st	3:05.5	0.0	Yuichi Fukunaga	(Aristoteles)
Nov 29	Tokyo	Japan Cup	1	2,400 m (Firm)	15	6	2.8 (2nd)	2nd	2:23.2	0.2	Yuichi Fukunaga	Almond Eye
2021 – four-year-old season
Apr 4	Hanshin	Ōsaka Hai	1	2,000 m (Soft)	13	7	1.8 (1st)	3rd	2:02.5	0.9	Yuichi Fukunaga	Lei Papale
Oct 31	Tokyo	Tennō Shō (Autumn)	1	2,000 m (Firm)	16	1	2.5 (1st)	2nd	1:58.0	0.1	Yuichi Fukunaga	Efforia
Nov 28	Tokyo	Japan Cup	1	2,400 m (Firm)	18	2	1.6 (1st)	1st	2:24.7	-0.3	Yuichi Fukunaga	(Authority)

Legend:

- R indicated that it was a record finish time.

Turf

== Stud career ==
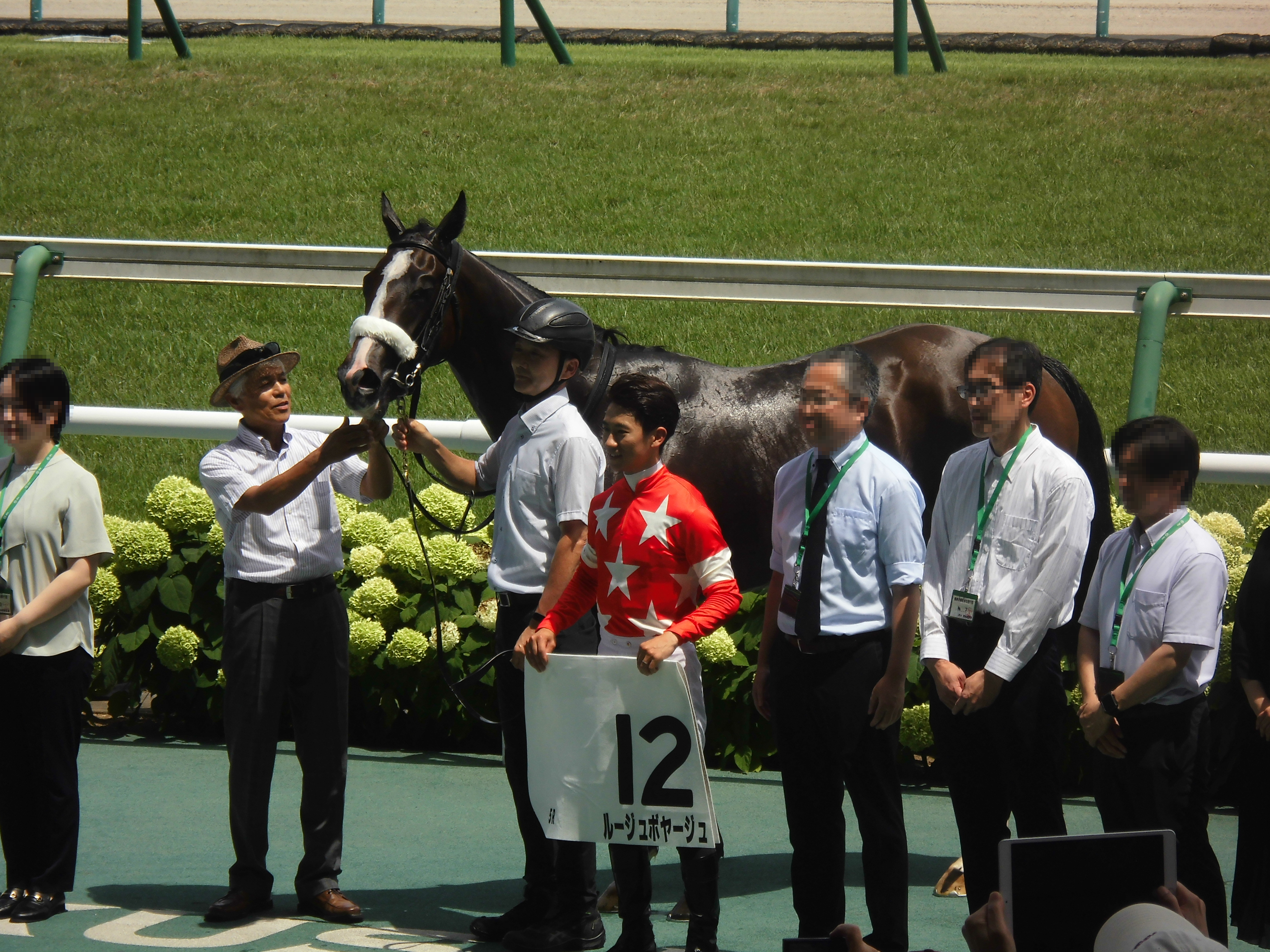
Rouge Voyage following her maiden race

Following his retirement, the horse assumed stud duty at the Shadai Stallion Station.

On June 15, 2025, the first progeny by Contrail, a colt named Yuma Ham and half brother to Ask Victor More, ran his debut race but finished fifth behind Realize Sirius. On July 13 of that same year, Contrail had his first winner when Rouge Voyage won her maiden race at Fukushima Racecourse. Contrail's progeny first graded race win came at the 2026 Aoba Sho by Going to Sky. In the same year, Going to Sky proceed to become his first G1 winning progeny when he snatched the 2026 Kikuka Sho.

=== Notable progeny ===
Below data is based on JBIS Stallion Reports.

c = colt, f = filly
bold = grade 1 stakes

**Foaled**	**Name**	**Sex**	**Major Wins**
2023	Coeli Vento	c	Leopard Stakes
2023	Congestus	c	Kyoto Shimbun Hai
2023	Going to Sky	c	Aoba Sho, **Kikuka Sho**

Going to Sky

== Pedigree ==
Pedigree of Contrail (JPN), dark bay or brown colt, 2017
Sire Deep Impact (JPN) 2002	Sunday Silence (USA); 1986	Halo	Hail to Reason
Sire Deep Impact (JPN) 2002	Sunday Silence (USA); 1986	Halo	Cosmah
Sire Deep Impact (JPN) 2002	Sunday Silence (USA); 1986	Wishing Well	Understanding
Sire Deep Impact (JPN) 2002	Sunday Silence (USA); 1986	Wishing Well	Mountain Flower
Sire Deep Impact (JPN) 2002	Wind in Her Hair (IRE); 1991	Alzao (USA)	Lyphard
Sire Deep Impact (JPN) 2002	Wind in Her Hair (IRE); 1991	Alzao (USA)	Lady Rebecca (GB)
Sire Deep Impact (JPN) 2002	Wind in Her Hair (IRE); 1991	Burghclere (GB)	Busted
Sire Deep Impact (JPN) 2002	Wind in Her Hair (IRE); 1991	Burghclere (GB)	Highclere
Dam Rhodochrosite (USA) 2010	Unbridled's Song (USA); 1993	Unbridled	Fappiano
Dam Rhodochrosite (USA) 2010	Unbridled's Song (USA); 1993	Unbridled	Gana Facil
Dam Rhodochrosite (USA) 2010	Unbridled's Song (USA); 1993	Trolley Song	Caro (IRE)
Dam Rhodochrosite (USA) 2010	Unbridled's Song (USA); 1993	Trolley Song	Lucky Spell
Dam Rhodochrosite (USA) 2010	Folklore (USA); 2003	Tiznow	Cee's Tizzy
Dam Rhodochrosite (USA) 2010	Folklore (USA); 2003	Tiznow	Cee's Song
Dam Rhodochrosite (USA) 2010	Folklore (USA); 2003	Contrive	Storm Cat
Dam Rhodochrosite (USA) 2010	Folklore (USA); 2003	Contrive	Jeano (Family: 1-x)

== See also ==
- List of racehorses
- St Lite (Japanese first Triple crown in 1941)
- Shinzan (Japanese Triple crown in 1964)
- Mr. C.B. (Japanese Triple crown in 1983)
- Symboli Rudolf (Japanese first undefeated Triple crown in 1984)
- Narita Brian (Japanese Triple crown in 1994)
- Deep Impact (Japanese undefeated Triple crown in 2005)
- Orfevre (Japanese Triple crown in 2011)
