= Lovcen (horse) =

Japanese-bred Thoroughbred racehorse

Lovcen ロブチェン
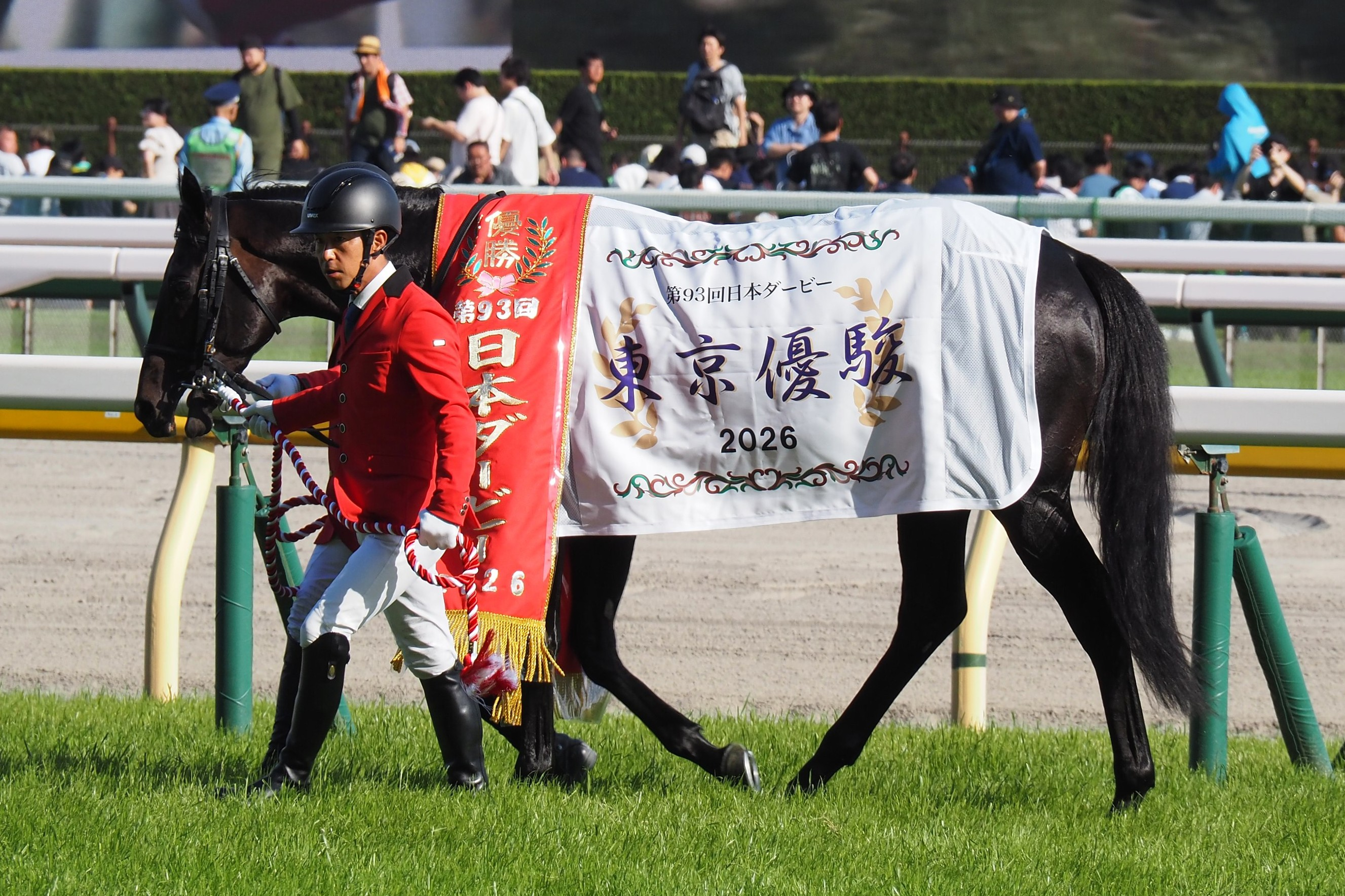
- Lovcen after the 2026 Japanese Derby
- Breed: Thoroughbred
- Sire: World Premiere
- Grandsire: Deep Impact
- Dam: Songwriting
- Damsire: Giant's Causeway
- Sex: Colt
- Foaled: April 9, 2023 (age 3)
- Country: Japan
- Colour: Dark Bay
- Breeder: Northern Farm
- Owner: Forest Racing
- Racing colours
- Trainer: Haruki Sugiyama
- Jockey: Kohei Matsuyama
- Record: 7: 5-0-1
- Earnings: ¥ 694,320,000

Major wins
- Hopeful Stakes (2025); Kobe Shimbun Hai (2026); Japanese Classic Race wins: Satsuki Sho (2026); Tokyo Yushun (2026)
- Last updated on May 31, 2026

Lovcen (Japanese: ロブチェン, Hepburn: Robuchen; foaled April 9, 2023) is a Japanese racehorse most well known for winning the Japanese Double Crown (the Satsuki Shō and Tōkyō Yūshun) in 2026.

== Background ==
Lovcen is a dark bay colt with no white markings bred by Northern Farm. He was sired by Kikuka-shō and Spring Tennō Shō winner World Premiere, and his dam, Songwriting, is a winless mare out of multiple Grade 3 winner and Canadian Champion Older Female Horse of 2011 Embur's Song. As a weanling, he was offered at the Northern Farm Mixed Sale and was bought by Kazumasa Kobayashi for 21 million yen. He was sent into training with Haruki Sugiyama, who also trained Justin Palace and 2020 Triple Tiara winner Daring Tact.

Lovcen is named for the mountain range of the same name in Montenegro.

== Racing career ==
=== Two-year-old season (2025) ===
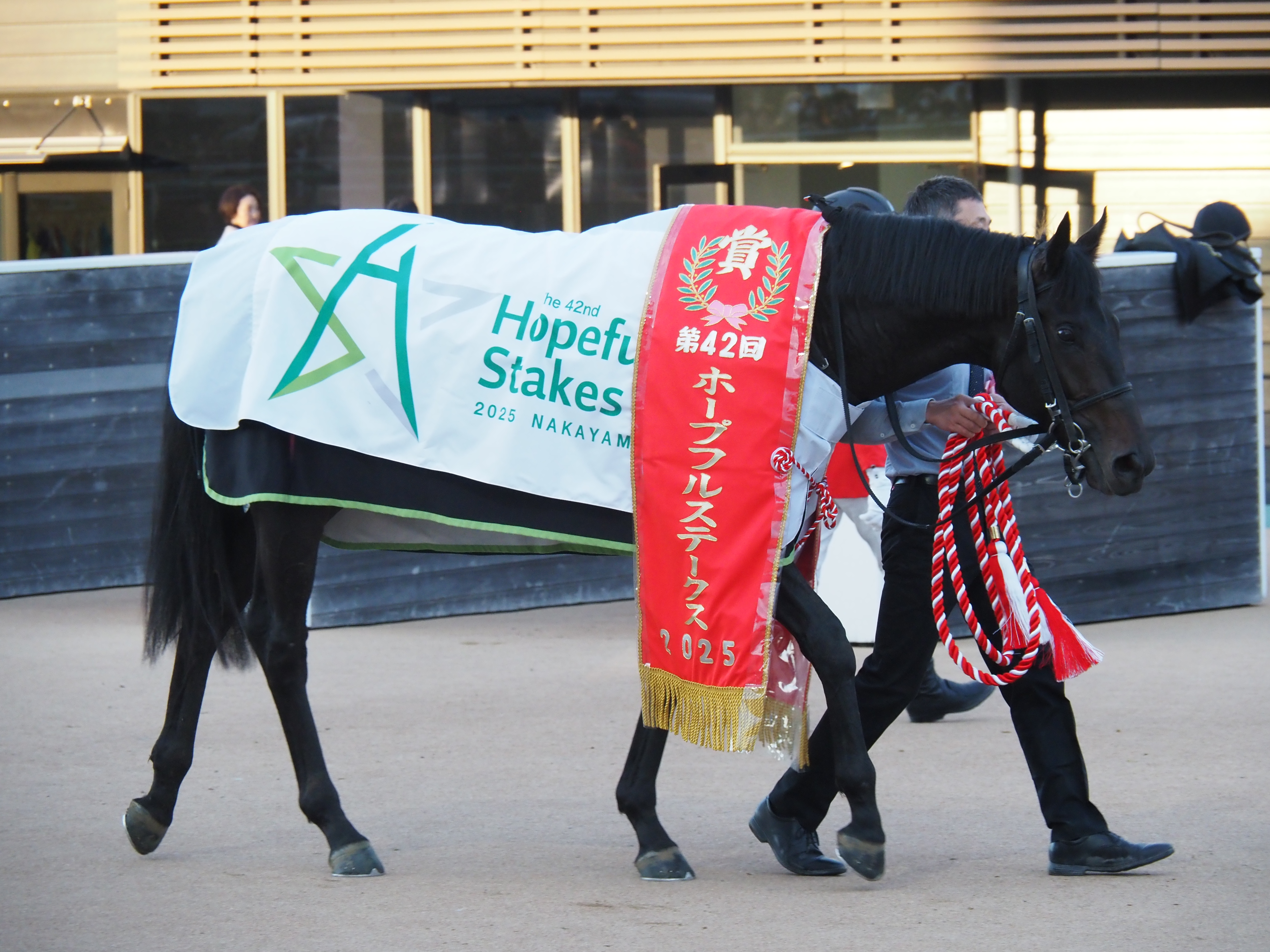
Lovcen after winning the Hopeful Stakes

Lovcen made his debut on November 9, 2025, over 2000 meters on a soft track at Kyoto Racecourse with Kohei Matsuyama in the saddle. Leading the entire way, he pulled away in the final straight to win by three lengths in front of second place Alpenglow. In an interview conducted after the race, Matsuyama remarked that "I was worried about the start, but the entire time he felt good to ride, and he was strong at the end. It might not be a good point of reference for the future since the track was heavy today, but I'm glad that he could hold the distance."

On December 27, Lovcen made his second and final start of the year in the Hopeful Stakes. Leading up to the race, his connections were confident, and said that his experience on heavy ground would serve him well on race day in Nakayama. He was sent off as the seventh favorite in a field of sixteen, Lovcen settled mid-pack and made a strong charge in the final 200 meters, surging past fourth favorite Forte Angelo in the final strides to win by three quarters of a length. His jockey, Matsuyama, told interviewers after the race, "I'm very happy. Last year, trainer Sugiyama and I got second in this race with Giovanni, and because of that I was able to win in this way today. Unconsciously, I welled up with tears."

=== Three-year-old season (2026) ===
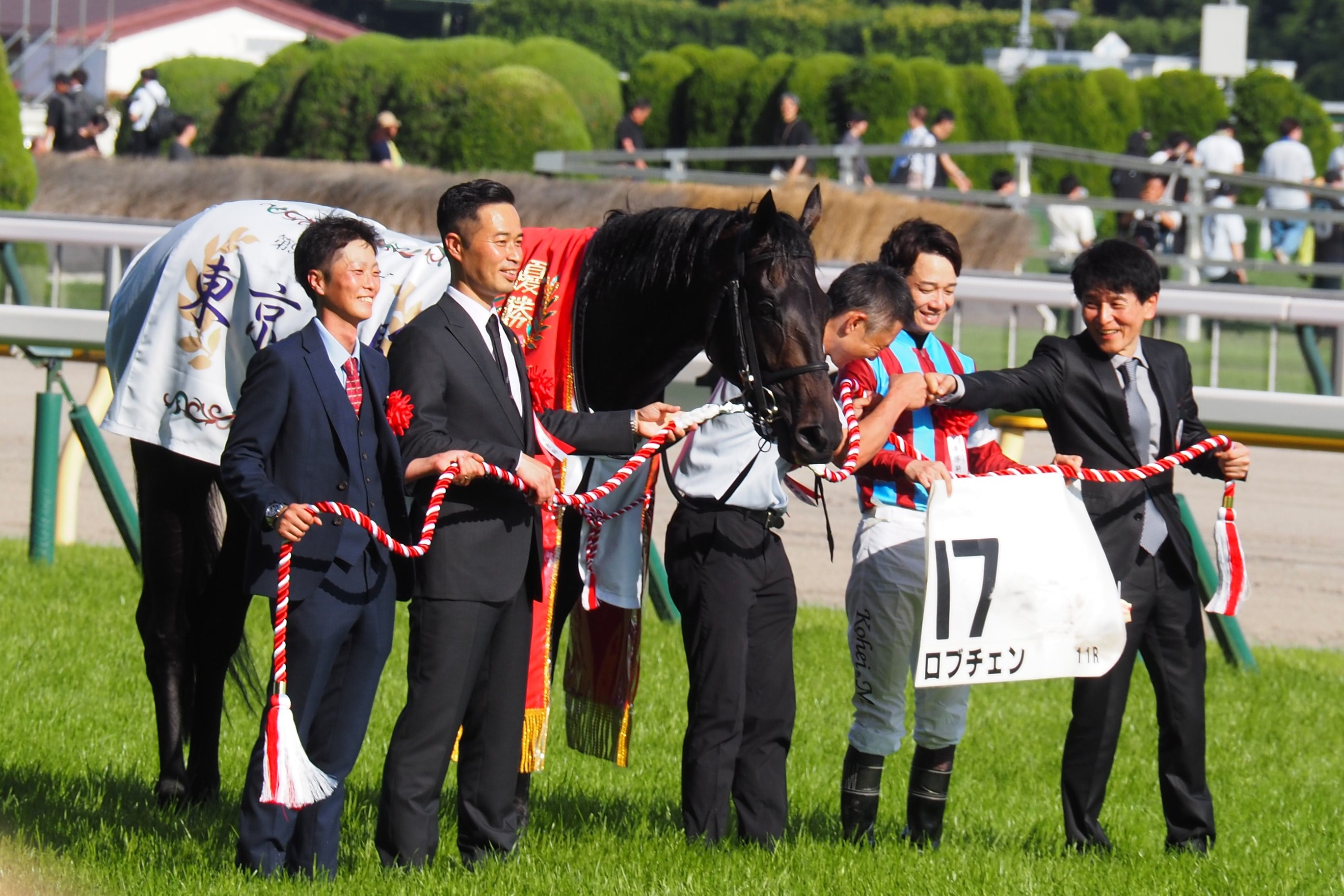
Lovcen at the post-victory ceremony of the Japanese Derby

Lovcen started the season off with the Kyodo Tsushin Hai, a race that Sugiyama chose intending to "test out if he can run a counter-clockwise course" and also to give an interval to the horse between the Satsuki Shō and the Tōkyō Yūshun. During the race, he made a good start but quickly fell back in to the middle of the pack. The horse started to move up on the final stretch, but was unable to catch up to Realize Sirius, who set a new race record, and was also passed by Bereshit, ultimately finishing third.

His next race would be the first jewel of the Japanese Triple Crown, the Satsuki Shō. He was sent off as the weak favorite at 4.0 odds in a field of eighteen. Both his jockey and his trainer expressed confidence leading up to the race, with his assistant trainer commenting that transport was not an issue, and that he was eating well and had been slowly improving since the Kyodo Tsushin Hai. Leading the entire race, he pulled away in the final stretch after a fast-paced race to win it by 3/4 of a length over rival Realize Sirius. Lovcen's victory broke the record set by Museum Mile the year before in 2025; it was broken by half a second. After the race, jockey Kohei Matsuyama spoke about the fierce duel between Lovcen and Realize Sirius in the final stretch, saying, "There was a moment when it looked like we might get past, but he fought back. He showed real toughness. His final kick is exceptional, and he also has the stamina to win in record time, like today."

Following the Satsuki Shō, he continued on the path of the Triple Crown to the Japanese Derby. He drew the outside post of 17, and was sent off as the favorite at 2.7 odds. Lovcen broke well from the gate, and was held mid-pack by jockey Kohei Matsuyama for the majority of the race before rallying in the final meters to win by a head over Peintre Naif, with a finishing time of 2:22.7. He became the first Derby winner for jockey Matsuyama, owner Forest Racing, and trainer Haruki Sugiyama. Lovcen became the first to achieve the Double Crown since Contrail in 2020, and is the first horse since Wagnerian to win from gate 17.

After being sent to pasture for the summer season, Lovcen returned to racing by challenging the Kobe Shimbun Hai, a preliminary race to the Kikuka Shō. He drew the innermost gate of 1, and was the overwhelming favorite at 1.4 odds. After breaking from the gate, he was reared to mid-pack once more but found himself surrounded by several other contenders and fell further behind. However, his jockey Kohei Matsuyama took advantage of an opening mid-race to shift him to the outside, from which he began his spurt after rounding the final corner. He ultimately narrowly passed Altramuz in the very final meters and won the race in a photo finish.

Lovcen's team announced his entry for the Kikuka Shō in the summer; although viewed as a favourite at 1.8 odds for the race and becoming the prospect of a ninth Triple Crown winner, it was noted by commentators that anticipation for Lovcen achieving the feat was unusually muted, citing Lovcen's propensity for winning by small margins and a lack of a main rival to challenge him. When the race began, Lovcen had his start delayed by rearing up in the stall, and found himself struggling to catch up due to being blocked by multiple horses, as well as fellow contender King Glory setting a chaotic pace by employing a runaway strategy. He ultimately faded at the end of the race, foiling his attempt at a Triple Crown win by finishing 14th, the lowest placement in his career, while Going to Sky, ridden by Yutaka Take, took the win. Speaking after the race, Matsuyama was frustrated with the race in overall as the horse started late from the gate and used up too much energy to get into the right position and gassed himself up in the final phase.

== Racing statistics ==
The following form is based on information available on netkeiba.com and JBIS-Search.

Date	Age	Track	Race	Grade	Distance (Condition)	Entry	HN	Odds (Favored)	Finish	Time	Winning Margins (Losing)	Jockey	Winner (Runner-up)
Nov 9, 2025	2	Kyoto	2YO Debut		2,000 m (Soft)	8	4	2.9 (2)	1st	2:04.5	3 lengths	Kohei Matsuyama	(Alpenglow)
Dec 27, 2025	2	Nakayama	Hopeful Stakes	GI	2,000 m (Firm)	16	7	19.8 (7)	1st	2:01.0	3/4 lengths	Kohei Matsuyama	(Forte Angelo)
Feb 15, 2026	3	Tokyo	Kyodo Tsushin Hai	GIII	1,800 m (Firm)	9	3	4.2 (3)	3rd	1:45.5	(neck)	Kohei Matsuyama	Realize Sirius
Apr 19, 2026	3	Nakayama	Satsuki Shō	GI	2,000 m (Firm)	18	4	4.0 (1)	1st	R1:56.5 (Note: R meant that it was a record time finish)	3/4 lengths	Kohei Matsuyama	(Realize Sirius)
May 31, 2026	3	Tokyo	Tōkyō Yūshun	GI	2,400 m (Firm)	18	17	2.7 (1)	1st	2:22.7	head	Kohei Matsuyama	(Peintre Naif)
Sep 21, 2026	3	Hanshin	Kobe Shimbun Hai	GII	2,400 m (Firm)	11	1	1.3 (1)	1st	2:25.9	nose	Kohei Matsuyama	(Altramuz)
Oct 25, 2026	3	Kyoto	Kikuka-shō	GI	3,000 m (Firm)	18	8	1.8 (1)	14th	3:05.8	(7 lengths)	Kohei Matsuyama	Going to Sky

Legend:
Turf

== Pedigree ==
Pedigree of Lovcen
Sire World Premiere 2016 dk. b.	Deep Impact; 2002 b.	Sunday Silence	Halo
Sire World Premiere 2016 dk. b.	Deep Impact; 2002 b.	Sunday Silence	Wishing Well
Sire World Premiere 2016 dk. b.	Deep Impact; 2002 b.	Wind in Her Hair	Alzao
Sire World Premiere 2016 dk. b.	Deep Impact; 2002 b.	Wind in Her Hair	Burghclere
Sire World Premiere 2016 dk. b.	Mandela; 2000 ch.	Acatenango	Surumu
Sire World Premiere 2016 dk. b.	Mandela; 2000 ch.	Acatenango	Aggravate
Sire World Premiere 2016 dk. b.	Mandela; 2000 ch.	Mandellicht	Be My Guest
Sire World Premiere 2016 dk. b.	Mandela; 2000 ch.	Mandellicht	Mandelauge
Dam Songwriting 2013 dk. b.	Giant's Causeway; 1997 ch.	Storm Cat	Storm Bird
Dam Songwriting 2013 dk. b.	Giant's Causeway; 1997 ch.	Storm Cat	Terlingua
Dam Songwriting 2013 dk. b.	Giant's Causeway; 1997 ch.	Mariah's Storm	Rahy
Dam Songwriting 2013 dk. b.	Giant's Causeway; 1997 ch.	Mariah's Storm	Immense
Dam Songwriting 2013 dk. b.	Embur's Song; 2007 b.	Unbridled's Song	Unbridled
Dam Songwriting 2013 dk. b.	Embur's Song; 2007 b.	Unbridled's Song	Trolley Song
Dam Songwriting 2013 dk. b.	Embur's Song; 2007 b.	Embur Sunshine	Bold Ruckus
Dam Songwriting 2013 dk. b.	Embur's Song; 2007 b.	Embur Sunshine	Vevila (Family 3-g)
