= Makahiki (horse) =

Japanese Thoroughbred racehorse

Makahiki; マカヒキ
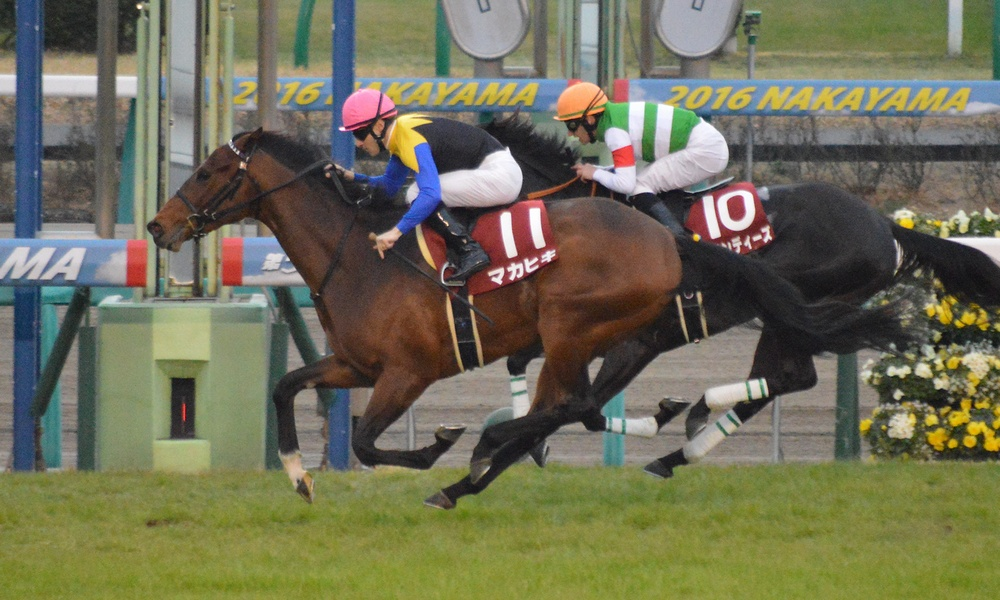
- Makahiki winning the Yayoi Sho
- Sire: Deep Impact
- Grandsire: Sunday Silence
- Dam: Wikiwiki
- Damsire: French Deputy
- Sex: Stallion
- Foaled: 28 January 2013
- Country: Japan
- Colour: Bay
- Breeder: Northern Farm
- Owner: Makoto Kaneko
- Racing colours
- Trainer: Yasuo Tomomichi
- Jockey: Yuga Kawada; Christophe Lemaire; Kota Fujioka
- Record: 24: 6-2-2
- Earnings: Japan: ¥630,075,000; Overseas: €74,100

Major wins
- Yayoi Sho (2016); Prix Niel (2016); Kyoto Daishoten (2021); Japanese Classic Race wins: Tokyo Yushun (2016)
- Last updated on 4 March 2026

Makahiki (Japanese: マカヒキ, foaled 28 January 2013) is a Japanese Thoroughbred racehorse. In 2016 he won the Yayoi Sho, Tokyo Yushun and Prix Niel. After failing to win for more than five years he took the Kyoto Daishoten as an eight-year-old in 2021.

== Background ==
Makahiki is a bay horse with a small white star and a white sock on his right front foot, bred at Northern Farm in Japan by his owner Makoto Kaneko. He is from the sixth crop of foals sired by Deep Impact who was the Japanese Horse of the Year in 2005 and 2006, winning races including the Tokyo Yushun, Tenno Sho, Arima Kinen and Japan Cup. Deep Impact's other progeny include Gentildonna, Harp Star, Kizuna, A Shin Hikari and Satono Diamond. Makahiki's dam Wikiwiki won one minor race from five starts in Japan, and had previously produced Uliuli (also by Deep Impact), a high-class racemare who won twice at Grade 3 level. Her dam Real Number and grand-dam Numeraria were both successful racemares in Argentina.

Makahiki was sent into training with Yasuo Tomomichi. He is named after a Hawaiian festival.

== Racing career ==
=== 2015: two-year-old season ===
Makahiki made his only appearance as a two-year-old in a contest for previously unraced horses over 1800 metres at Kyoto Racecourse on 18 October. He made a successful debut, beating Enbharr and nine others.

=== 2016: three-year-old season ===
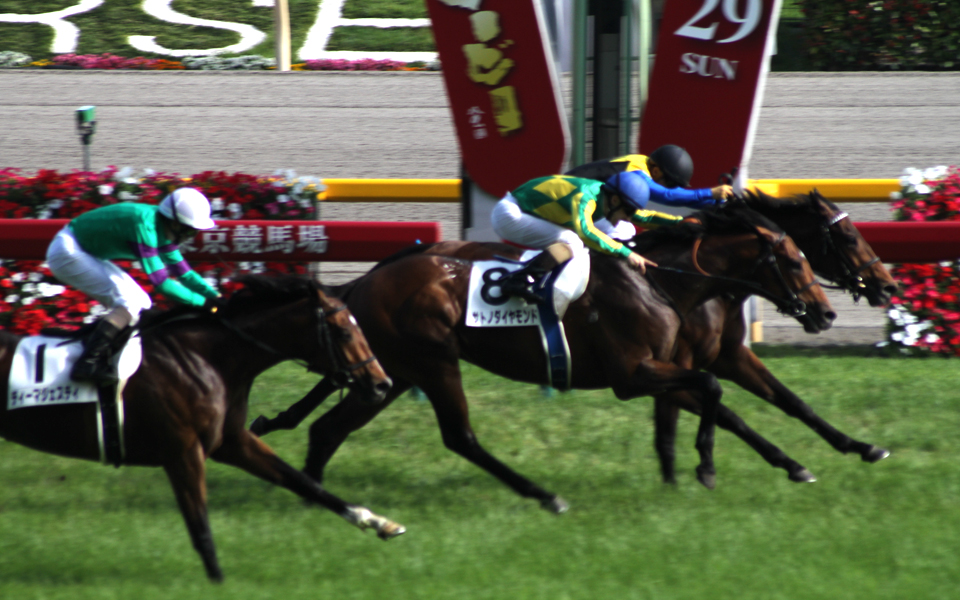
Makahiki beats Satono Diamond in the Tokyo Yushun

Makahiki began his second season on 23 January when he was moved up to Listed class and won the Wakagoma Stakes over 2000 metres at Kyoto. On 3 March he was stepped up again for the Grade 2 Yayoi Sho (a major trial race for the Satsuki Sho) over 2000 metres at Nakayama Racecourse and started second favourite behind Leontes, the Japanese champion juvenile of 2015. Ridden by Christophe Lemaire he produced a strong finish to win by a neck and two lengths from Leontes and Air Spinel. The Racing Post's Sam Walker rated his performance as the best by a three-year-old in 2016 up to that time and described the winner a potential Prix de l'Arc de Triomphe contender. Lemaire rode the favourite Satono Diamond in the Satsuki Sho on 17 April at Nakayama with Yuga Kawada taking over the ride on Makahiki who was the 2.7/1 third choice in an eighteen-runner field. Makahiki raced towards the rear of the field on the outside before finishing strongly to take second place, beaten one and a half lengths behind the 30/1 outsider Dee Majesty. Commenting on the colt's performance Tomomichi said "He wasn’t able to catch the winner, who had made his move before he did, but this horse did run really well in the stretch. He lost but I think it was by no means a bad race".

On 29 May, in front of a 140,000 crowd at Tokyo Racecourse, Makahishi was one of eighteen colts to contest the 83rd running of the Tokyo Yushun. Dee Majesty, Leontes, Air Spinel and Satono Diamond were again in opposition in a race run over 2400 metres on firm ground. With Kawada again in the saddle, he raced towards the middle of the field before making progress approaching the final turn but looked unlikely to obtain a clear run in the straight. Kawada sent Makahishi through a narrow gap 300 metres from the finish, took the lead in the closing stages and won by a nose from Satono Diamond. Commenting on his successful tactics Kawada said "The colt broke smoothly and I was able to race him in good position as planned. I gradually advanced him while marking Satono Diamond and he stretched really well after threading through a small opening. The moment we crossed the wire, I felt that we were a margin in front but I was overwhelmed with joy when the photo-finish result came out".

In the summer of 2016 Makahiki was sent to France prepare for a run in the Prix de l'Arc de Triomphe which was run that year at Chantilly Racecourse as Longchamp was closed for redevelopment. He trialed for the race in the Group Two Prix Niel over 2400 metres at Chantilly on 11 September. Ridden by Lemaire, he started the odds-on favourite against four opponents including the British-trained Midterm, the one-time favourite for The Derby. After racing in third place until the straight he overtook Midterm in the closing stages and won by a neck. Lemaire commented "Today was just a step and I think he was 70%, 80% fit. I’m sure he will improve... He's a very clever and relaxed horse. He knows his job, he really does what you ask him to do and he preserves himself. Today he came very easily to the front and then just relaxed." On 2 October the colt started 3.9/1 second favourite for the Prix de l'Arc de Triomphe, but never looked likely to win and finished fourteenth of the sixteen runners behind Found.

=== 2017–2022: later career ===
On his debut as a four-year-old Makahiki started favourite for the Kyoto Kinen over 2200 metres on 12 February but finished third behind Satono Crown and Smart Layer. He ran consistently for the rest of the year but failed to win as he came home fourth in the Osaka Hai, sixth in the Mainichi Okan, fifth in the autumn edition of the Tenno Sho and fourth in the Japan Cup. As a five-year-old Makahiki made only three appearances, finishing second in the Sapporo Kinen and then running unplaced in the Tenno Sho and the Arima Kinen. In 2019 the horse ran third in the Kyoto Kinen and fourth in the Osaka Hai but was unplaced in the Takarazuka Kinen. In the autumn of that year he finished tenth in the Tenno Sho before ending his campaign with a fourth place behind Suave Richard in the Japan Cup. Makahiki made no impact in two starts as a seven-year-old, finishing unplaced in the Osaka Hai and Japan Cup.

His eight-year-old season started with the Tenno Sho Spring, in which he finished in 8th place. He then entered the Kyoto Daishoten, in which he made his final victory of his career against the more favored Aristotles. Makahiki would go on to run in the Japan Cup, Kyoto Kinen, Osaka Hai, and the Sapporo Kinen before finally retiring on October 25, 2022 to stand stud at the Lex Stud in Shinhidaka, Hokkaido.

== Racing form ==
Makahiki won six races and hit the podium four more times out of 28 starts. This data is available based on JBIS, netkeiba and racingpost.

Date	Track	Race	Grade	Distance (Condition)	Entry	HN	Odds (Favored)	Finish	Time	Margins	Jockey	Winner (Runner-up)
2015 – two-year-old season
Oct 18	Kyoto	2yo Newcomer		1,800 m (Firm)	11	5	1.6 (1)	1st	1:47.7	–0.4	Mirco Demuro	(Enbharr)
2016 – three-year-old season
Jan 23	Kyoto	Wakagoma Stakes	OP	2,000 m (Firm)	8	5	1.6 (1)	1st	2:02.4	–0.2	Christophe Lemaire	(Noble Mars)
Mar 6	Nakayama	Yayoi Sho	2	2,000 m (Firm)	12	11	2.6 (2)	1st	1:59.9	0.0	Christophe Lemaire	(Leontes)
Apr 17	Nakayama	Satsuki Sho	1	2,000 m (Firm)	18	3	3.7 (3)	2nd	1:58.1	0.2	Yuga Kawada	Dee Majesty
May 29	Tokyo	Tokyo Yushun	1	2,400 m (Firm)	18	3	4.0 (3)	1st	2:24.0	0.0	Yuga Kawada	(Satono Diamond)
Sep 11	Chantilly	Prix Niel	2	2,400 m (Firm)	5	5	4/9 (1)	1st	2:35.8	0.0	Christophe Lemaire	(Midterm)
Oct 2	Chantilly	Prix de l'Arc de Triomphe	1	2,400 m (Firm)	16	14	13/2 (2)	14th	2:28.3	4.7	Christophe Lemaire	Found
2017 – four-year-old season
Feb 12	Kyoto	Kyoto Kinen	2	2,200 m (Good)	10	3	1.7 (1)	3rd	2:14.3	0.2	Ryan Moore	Satono Crown
Apr 2	Hanshin	Osaka Hai	1	2,000 m (Firm)	14	14	3.8 (2)	4th	1:59.3	0.4	Christophe Lemaire	Kitasan Black
Oct 8	Tokyo	Mainichi Okan	2	1,800 m (Firm)	12	2	5.6 (2)	6th	1:45.9	0.3	Hiroyuki Uchida	Real Steel
Oct 29	Tokyo	Tenno Sho (Autumn)	1	2,000 m (Heavy)	18	15	22.6 (9)	5th	2:09.5	1.2	Hiroyuki Uchida	Kitasan Black
Nov 26	Tokyo	Japan Cup	1	2,400 m (Firm)	17	11	15.0 (6)	4th	2:24.6	0.9	Hiroyuki Uchida	Cheval Grand
2018 – five-year-old season
Aug 19	Sapporo	Sapporo Kinen	2	2,000 m (Good)	16	5	4.3 (1)	2nd	2:01.1	0.0	Christophe Lemaire	Sungrazer
Oct 28	Tokyo	Tenno Sho (Autumn)	1	2,000 m (Firm)	12	6	7.0 (3)	7th	1:57.7	0.9	Yutaka Take	Rey de Oro
Dec 23	Nakayama	Arima Kinen	1	2,500 m (Good)	16	4	42.5 (12)	10th	2:33.0	0.8	Yasunari Iwata	Blast Onepiece
2019 – six-year-old season
Feb 10	Kyoto	Kyoto Kinen	2	2,200 m (Firm)	12	12	4.4 (2)	3rd	2:14.9	0.1	Yasunari Iwata	Danburite
Mar 31	Hanshin	Osaka Hai	1	2,000 m (Firm)	14	1	37.4 (10)	4th	2:01.2	0.2	Yasunari Iwata	Al Ain
Jun 23	Hanshin	Takarazuka Kinen	1	2,200 m (Firm)	12	7	11.8 (7)	11th	2:12.9	2.1	Yasunari Iwata	Lys Gracieux
Oct 27	Tokyo	Tenno Sho (Autumn)	1	2,000 m (Firm)	16	8	53.0 (8)	10th	1:57.6	1.4	Yutaka Take	Almond Eye
Nov 24	Tokyo	Japan Cup	1	2,400 m (Soft)	15	14	50.4 (12)	4th	2:26.5	0.6	Yutaka Take	Suave Richard
2020 – seven-year-old season
Apr 5	Hanshin	Osaka Hai	1	2,000 m (Firm)	12	9	39.6 (7)	11th	1:59.5	1.1	Lyle Hewitson	Lucky Lilac
Nov 29	Tokyo	Japan Cup	1	2,400 m (Firm)	15	12	226.1 (11)	9th	2:24.2	1.2	Kosei Miura	Almond Eye
2021 – eight-year-old season
May 2	Hanshin	Tenno Sho (Spring)	1	3,200 m (Firm)	17	6	98.4 (12)	8th	3:16.5	1.8	Kota Fujioka	World Premiere
Oct 10	Hanshin	Kyoto Daishoten	2	2,400 m (Firm)	14	8	32.1 (9)	1st	2:24.5	0.0	Kota Fujioka	(Aristoteles)
Nov 28	Tokyo	Japan Cup	1	2,400 m (Firm)	18	15	76.9 (12)	14th	2:26.5	1.8	Kota Fujioka	Contrail
2022 – nine-year-old season
Feb 13	Hanshin	Kyoto Kinen	2	2,200 m (Good)	13	12	24.3 (9)	11th	2:13.3	1.4	Mirai Iwata	African Gold
Apr 3	Hanshin	Osaka Hai	1	2,000 m (Firm)	16	16	145.9 (13)	14th	2:00.0	1.6	Mirai Iwata	Potager
Aug 21	Sapporo	Sapporo Kinen	2	2,000 m (Firm)	16	1	50.0 (10)	16th	2:04.6	3.4	Yutaka Take	Jack d'Or

Legend:
Turf

== Pedigree ==
Pedigree of Makahiki (JPN), bay colt 2013
Sire Deep Impact (JPN) 2002	Sunday Silence (USA); 1986	Halo	Hail to Reason
Sire Deep Impact (JPN) 2002	Sunday Silence (USA); 1986	Halo	Cosmah
Sire Deep Impact (JPN) 2002	Sunday Silence (USA); 1986	Wishing Well	Understanding
Sire Deep Impact (JPN) 2002	Sunday Silence (USA); 1986	Wishing Well	Mountain Flower
Sire Deep Impact (JPN) 2002	Wind in Her Hair (IRE); 1991	Alzao	Lyphard
Sire Deep Impact (JPN) 2002	Wind in Her Hair (IRE); 1991	Alzao	Lady Rebecca
Sire Deep Impact (JPN) 2002	Wind in Her Hair (IRE); 1991	Burghclere	Busted
Sire Deep Impact (JPN) 2002	Wind in Her Hair (IRE); 1991	Burghclere	Highclere
Dam Wikiwiki (JPN) 2004	French Deputy (USA); 1992	Deputy Minister	Vice Regent
Dam Wikiwiki (JPN) 2004	French Deputy (USA); 1992	Deputy Minister	Mint Copy
Dam Wikiwiki (JPN) 2004	French Deputy (USA); 1992	Mitterand	Hold Your Peace
Dam Wikiwiki (JPN) 2004	French Deputy (USA); 1992	Mitterand	Laredo Lass
Dam Wikiwiki (JPN) 2004	Real Number (ARG); 1997	Rainbow Corner	Rainbow Quest
Dam Wikiwiki (JPN) 2004	Real Number (ARG); 1997	Rainbow Corner	Kingscote
Dam Wikiwiki (JPN) 2004	Real Number (ARG); 1997	Numeraria	Southern Halo
Dam Wikiwiki (JPN) 2004	Real Number (ARG); 1997	Numeraria	Numismatica (Family: 1-m)
