= Going to Sky =

Japanese-bred Thoroughbred racehorse

Going to Sky ゴーイントゥスカイ
- Going to Sky at his maiden race (2025)
- Breed: Thoroughbred
- Sire: Contrail
- Grandsire: Deep Impact
- Dam: Goin to the Window
- Damsire: Tapit
- Sex: Colt
- Foaled: March 12, 2023 (age 3)
- Country: Japan
- Colour: Bay
- Breeder: Chiyoda Farm Shizunai
- Owner: Field Racing
- Racing colours
- Trainer: Yuki Uehara
- Jockey: Yutaka Take
- Record: 7: 3-0-1
- Earnings: ¥344,298,000

Major wins
- Aoba Sho (2026); Kikuka Sho (2026)

Going to Sky (Japanese: ゴーイントゥスカイ, Hepburn: Gōin Tu Sukai; foaled March 12, 2023) is a Japanese racehorse who won the Kikuka Sho, the last leg of the Japanese Triple Crown in 2026.

== Background ==
Going to Sky was foaled out of Goin to the Window, an American-bred mare that won three races and finished on the podium in other races, but one out of 12 starts. He was sired by Contrail, who was the third undefeated and eighth overall triple crown winner in 2020 who was sired by another triple crown in Deep Impact himself.

In 2023, he was sold by Chiyoda Farm Shizunai to TMK Racing (later switched name to Field Racing) as Hip number 434 for ¥33,000,000. He was named after an ambitious and motivational quote that sounds – Aiming towards the sky with your high goals and dreams.

== Racing career ==
=== 2025: two-year-old season ===
He made his debut in a 2000 metres maiden race at the Tokyo Racecourse alongside Kiwamu Ogino in October. When the race started, the horse ran calmly in third position in the early phase. As the race approached the end, the gap narrowed for his advance, but the horse went inside and made a strong charge on the inner rail and overtook the others just before the finish line to win by a length. Ogino said it was going well early on but as he was boxed in, the horse's strength helped him to drive through the traffic as he unleashed a good burst in the final straight. One month later, he ran in his first-ever graded stakes race, the Kyoto Nisai Stakes, a 2000 metres race held at Kyoto Racecourse. In this race, he stayed mostly at the back due to his difficulty at the first corner, but made up ground on the final corner as he moved to the outside and made a bid for the win. Unfortunately, he lacked some cutting-edge speed in the final straight, dropped slightly, and finished third behind Justin Vista and Ask Edinburgh on the line. Ogino admitted that the horse had a rough time running on the outside but praised his strength and willpower to recover.

=== 2026: three-year-old season ===
Going to Sky at the Kikka Sho ceremony

In January, his trainer, Yuki Uehara, announced that the horse would start his season at the Kisaragi Sho in February. The race on the day turned out to be slow as the pack jumbled up for position. Going to Sky made a move at the end, but he was held back by the leading pack as he only came home in sixth place. Ogino mentioned the slow pace but was glad that the horse was calm throughout the race, as he managed to cue the horse to accelerate at the end. His next endeavour would be the Aoba Sho in April, as he would be assigned to a new jockey, Yutaka Take, for the race. As the race progressed, Take cued the horse to pull away in the middle of the race and held on to the lead to win by three-quarters of a length over the second-place finisher, Tidal Rock. Take said in the post-race that he thought the horse was a great one and was surprised that they secured a better position in the middle of the race despite starting from the outside gate. This race was the first graded win for the horse, the first graded win for Contrail's progeny, and qualified him for the second leg of the classic, the Tokyo Yushun in May. Reaching the day, Take said that Going to Sky had a lot of potential and thought they could do better in this next encounter. When the race began, the horse settled himself at the back of the pack in 15th position. As they approached the final bend, Going to Sky accelerated and unleashed the fastest late kick of the day, but he was too far behind and had too much ground to cover in the closing stage, finishing fourth behind Basse Terre by a nose. In the aftermath, Take explained that the start was not too good so he tried to control the rhythm from the back. They gradually managed to close the gap, but the difference in speed proved to be the deciding factor.

He was rested in the summer and planned to make a comeback at the Niigata Kinen initially. The plan changed after Uehara consulted Take about it and sent him to the Kikuka Sho's trial race, the St Lite Kinen instead. Regarding his recent form, Uehara is convinced that a comeback performance in Kikuka Sho was viable, as they noted that the horse was stronger on left turn courses prompted them to train him on the right turn instead. (Note: Kyoto Racecourse is a right turn course) As the favourite for the day, Take maintained his strategy of staying at the back and making the ground in the end. As usual, the horse burst forward in the final furlong but was unable to catch the leader as he crossed the finish line in sixth. On this occasion, Take noted that the slow start and slow pace in the race made it tougher for the horse to make his breakaway in the end. For the Kikuka Sho, Take would remain his jockey as he was aiming for the record sixth win for the said race. When the gates opened, Going to Sky broke smoothly out of the gate as Take maintained his rhythm and conserved his energy in the middle. Meanwhile, King Glory blazed through the front early on and opened up a nearly 20-length margin at one point. As the field rounded the final corner, King Glory's pace dwindled as he fizzled out whilst the field caught up to him. Entering the straight, Going to Sky aimed straight in the middle and charged down for the lead as he overtook them all in the final 100 metres. He surged to the wire whilst almost pegged by on rushing Basse Terre, ridden by Yuga Kawada from the outside, but he prevailed on the day by a nose whilst Danon History finished in third one length behind. In the post-race, Take was exhilarated and commented:

"He (Going To Sky) ran a good race in the Derby, and I felt we had a good chance in the last leg of the Triple Crown. I knew there were some strong horses in the field, but I wanted to focus on riding my own race. I've ridden this colt several times now, and I’d given a lot of thought to how best to ride him. He settled nicely in a good spot along the rails, and I felt we were in a very good rhythm. I decided to wait and make our move in the stretch. He responded well once given the green light, and with about 200m to go, I thought we might win."

This was the 87th G1 win for Take, the first G1 win for the trainer, Uehara; the first G1 win for the owner, Field Racing; and Take won the Kikuka Sho for the record of sixth time since Super Creek (1988), Dance in the Dark (1996), Air Shakur (2000), Deep Impact (2005) and World Premiere (2019).

== Racing statistics ==
The following data is based on information available on netkeiba and JBIS.

Going to Sky Race Record
Date	Age	Track	Race	Grade	Distance (Condition)	Entry	HN	Odds (Favored)	Finish	Time	Winning Margins (Losing)	Jockey	Winner (Runner-up)
Oct 5, 2025	2	Tokyo	2YO Debut		2,000 m (Firm)	15	6	4.0 (2)	1st	2:00.8	neck	Kiwamu Ogino	(Mr Right)
Nov 29, 2025	2	Kyoto	Kyoto Nisai Stakes	GIII	2,000 m (Firm)	11	10	6.2 (3)	3rd	2:00.6	(1 length)	Kiwamu Ogino	Justin Vista
Feb 10, 2026	3	Kyoto	Kisaragi Sho	GIII	1,800 m (Firm)	9	4	4.2 (3)	6th	1:48.3	(1 1/2 lengths)	Kiwamu Ogino	Zoroastro
Apr 25, 2026	3	Tokyo	Aoba Sho	GII	2,400 m (Firm)	18	16	8.1 (4)	1st	2:23.0	3/4 lengths	Yutaka Take	(Tidal Rock)
May 31, 2026	3	Tokyo	Tōkyō Yūshun	GI	2,400 m (Firm)	18	14	6.6 (3)	4th	2:22.8	(3/4 lengths)	Yutaka Take	Lovcen
Sep 13, 2026	3	Nakayama	St Lite Kinen	GII	2,200 m (Good)	16	8	4.3 (1)	6th	2:14.4	(1 1/2 lengths)	Yutaka Take	Justin Chicago
Oct 25, 2026	3	Kyoto	Kikuka-shō	GI	3,000 m (Firm)	18	9	12.0 (3)	1st	3:04.5	nose	Yutaka Take	(Basse Terre)

== Pedigree ==
Pedigree of Going to Sky
Sire Contrail dk. b. 2017	Deep Impact b. 2002	Sunday Silence	Halo
Sire Contrail dk. b. 2017	Deep Impact b. 2002	Sunday Silence	Wishing Well
Sire Contrail dk. b. 2017	Deep Impact b. 2002	Wind in Her Hair	Alzao
Sire Contrail dk. b. 2017	Deep Impact b. 2002	Wind in Her Hair	Burghclere
Sire Contrail dk. b. 2017	Rhodochrosite gr. 2010	Unbridled's Song	Unbridled
Sire Contrail dk. b. 2017	Rhodochrosite gr. 2010	Unbridled's Song	Trolley Song
Sire Contrail dk. b. 2017	Rhodochrosite gr. 2010	Folklore	Tiznow
Sire Contrail dk. b. 2017	Rhodochrosite gr. 2010	Folklore	Contrive
Dam Goin to the Window b. 2010	Tapit gr. 2001	Pulpit	A.P. Indy
Dam Goin to the Window b. 2010	Tapit gr. 2001	Pulpit	Preach
Dam Goin to the Window b. 2010	Tapit gr. 2001	Tap Your Heels	Unbridled
Dam Goin to the Window b. 2010	Tapit gr. 2001	Tap Your Heels	Ruby Slippers
Dam Goin to the Window b. 2010	Queens Full b. 2004	Indian Charlie	In Excess
Dam Goin to the Window b. 2010	Queens Full b. 2004	Indian Charlie	Soviet Sojourn
Dam Goin to the Window b. 2010	Queens Full b. 2004	Puestera	Forty Niner
Dam Goin to the Window b. 2010	Queens Full b. 2004	Puestera	Too Chic

- Going to Sky has a 4x4 inbreeding of Unbridled, meaning that the horse's name shows up twice in the pedigree.
