= Hopeful Stakes (Japan) =

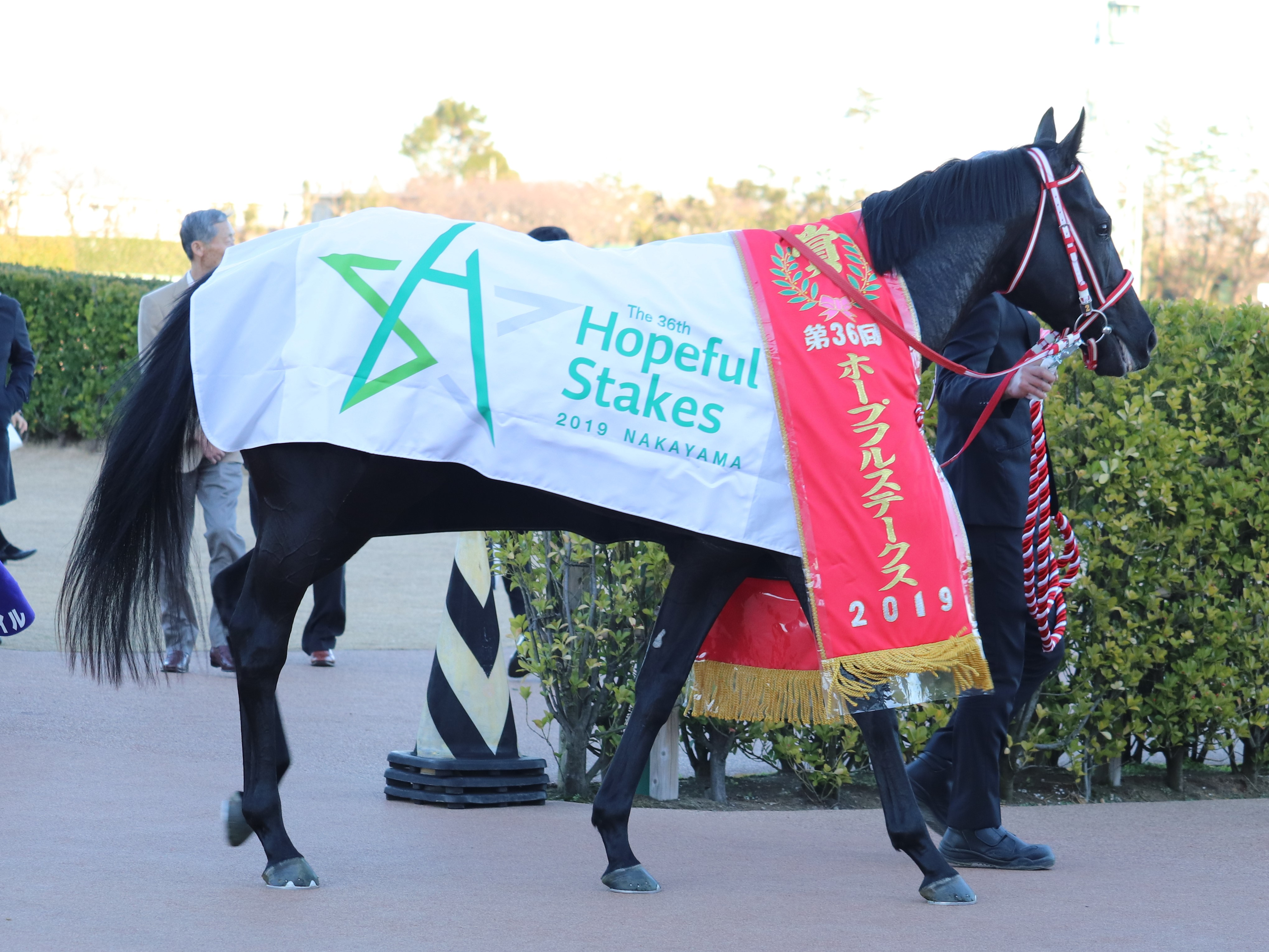
- 2019 Hopeful Stakes winner Contrail wearing the prize blanket post-race
- Class: Grade 1
- Location: Nakayama Racecourse; Funabashi, Chiba, Japan
- Inaugurated: December 9, 1984 (as Radio Tanpa Hai Sansai Hinba Stakes)
- Race type: Thoroughbred - Flat racing

Race information
- Distance: 2,000 meters (about 10 furlongs / 1.1/4 mile)
- Surface: Turf
- Track: Right-handed (inner course)
- Qualification: Two-year-old Colts & Fillies, no Geldings
- Weight: Colt 56 kg, Filly 55 kg
- Purse: ¥ 151,700,000 (as of 2025): 1st: ¥ 70,000,000; 2nd: ¥ 28,000,000; 3rd: ¥ 18,000,000

The Hopeful Stakes (ホープフルステークス) is a Grade 1 race for two-year-old thoroughbreds held at Nakayama Racecourse, Japan.

== History ==
The Hopeful Stakes is the only Grade 1 middle-distance race for two-year-old thoroughbreds in the JRA. This race was started as the Radio Tampa Hai Sansai Himba Stakes (Grade 3) in 1984, which was a mile race that was held at Hanshin Racecourse for two-year-old fillies. In 1991, the race was changed from a filly-only race to a colt-and-gelding only race, with the distance extended to the current 2,000 meters. Its name was changed several times (Radio Tampa Hai Sansai Stakes (1991-2000), Radio Tampa Hai Nisai Stakes (2001-2005) and Radio Nikkei Hai Nisai Stakes (2006-2013)). This race was considered important because no other graded race over 2,000 meters for two-year-olds existed in those days (and to date the only other graded race held on a middle distance by the JRA is the Kyoto Nisai Stakes). In particular, it was a good chance for horses with ambition for Triple Crown Races to experience a middle-distance race. In fact, some triple crown race winners had previously won this race. Logi Universe (2008), One and Only (2013), Rey de Oro (2016), and Croix du Nord (2024) won the Japanese Derby, Victoire Pisa (also Dubai World Cup winner) (2009) won the Satsuki Shō, Epiphaneia (2012) won the Kikuka Shō, and Contrail, who won the race in 2019, became the winner of the Triple Crown in 2020. Lovcen, who won the most recent running of the race in 2025, has also since gone on both the Satsuki Shō and Japanese Derby, with the last leg of the Triple Crown, the Kikuka Shō, to be held on October 25th.

In 2014, the Asahi Hai Futurity Stakes, a grade 1 race for two-year-old colts previously held at Nakayama Racecourse, was moved to Hanshin Racecourse. Then the Radio Nikkei Hai Nisai Stakes was moved to Nakayama Racecourse. With this transfer, its name was changed to Hopeful Stakes, and the grade of the race was elevated to Grade 2, and the race was once again opened to fillies, although this time geldings were barred from entering. The race was later promoted to Grade 1 level in 2017.

Until 2016, this race was held on Arima Kinen day. But since 2017, the race was moved to December 28, which is the final day of the JRA racing season. However, if the Arima Kinen is scheduled on December 28, the Hopeful Stakes would be held a day earlier on December 27, on the same day as the Nakayama Daishogai.

== Past Winners ==
Year	Winner	Jockey	Trainer	Owner	Time
Radio Tampa Hai Sansai Himba Stakes (Grade 3) Hanshin Turf 1,600 metres, 2yo fillies only
1984	Nihon Pillow Vicky	Hiroshi Kawachi	Kotaro Tanaka	Hyakutaro Kobayashi	1:35:9
1985	Dyna Campari	Hiroshi Higuchi	Mitsumasa Hamada	Shadai Race Horse	1:37:1
1986	Dokanjo	Nobuyuki Tajima	Yasuo Ikee	Arai Kogyo	1:35:5
1987	Princess Ski	Yoshiyasu Tajima	Kota Tanaka	Kiyoharu Okuyama	1:36.6
1988	Tanino Target	Sadahiro Kojima	Tameo Toyama	Yuzo Tanimizu	1:36.1
1989	Legacy Wice	Yutaka Take	Masahiro Sakaguchi	Horse Tajima	1:35.8
1990	Isono Roubles	Tadashi Igarashi	Hisao Shimizu	Toshio Isono	1:35:0
Radio Tampa Hai Sansai Stakes (Grade 3) Hanshin Turf 2,000 metres, 2yo colts and geldings only
1991	Northern Conduct	Shinji Fujita	Shuji Ito	Shadai Race Horse	2:05:9
1992	Narita Taishin	Eiji Shimizu	Masaaki Okubo	Hidenori Yamaji	2:05.8
1993	Namura Kokuo	Hiroyuki Uemura	Akihiko Nomura	Nobushige Namura	2:05.7
1994	Tayasu Tsuyoshi	Sadahiro Kojima	Akio Tsurudome	Kanichi Yokose	2:03.4
1995	Royal Touch	Olivier Peslier	Yuji Ito	Yoshimi Ota	2:02.7
1996	Mejiro Bright	Mikio Matsunaga	Kuniichi Asami	Mejiro Farm	2:03.1
1997	Lord Ax	Yukio Okabe	Kazuo Fujisawa	Lord Horse Club	2:03.8
1998	Admire Vega	Yutaka Take	Mitsuru Hashida	Riichi Kondo	2:04.1
1999	Rugger Regulus	Tetsuzo Sato	Masaaki Okubo	Keiji Okumura	2:03:7
2000	Agnes Tachyon	Hiroshi Kawachi	Hiroyuki Nagahama	Takao Watanabe	2:00.8
Radio Tampa Hai Nisai Stakes (Grade 3) Hanshin Turf 2,000 metres, 2yo colts and geldings only
2001	Mega Stardom	Kunihiko Watanabe	Shoji Yamamoto	North Hills Management	2:03.4
2002	That's the Plenty	Hiroshi Kawachi	Kojiro Hashiguchi	Shadai Race Horse	2:04.5
2003	Cosmo Bulk	Fuyuki Igarashi	Kazunori Tabe	Misako Okada	2:01.6
2004	Vermilion	Yutaka Take	Sei Ishisaka	Sunday Racing Co. Ltd.	2:03.5
2005	Sakura Mega Wonder	Katsumi Ando	Yasuo Tomomichi	Sakura Commerce	2:01.9
Radio NIKKEI Hai Nisai Stakes (Grade 3) Hanshin Turf 2,000 metres, 2yo colts and geldings only
2006	Fusaichi Ho O	Katsumi Ando	Kunihide Matsuda	Fusao Sekiguchi	2:02:1
2007	Subject	Olivier Peslier	Yasuo Ikee	North Hills Management	2:07:0
2008	Logi Universe	Norihiro Yokoyama	Kiyoshi Hagiwara	Masaaki Kumeta	2:01:7
2009	Victoire Pisa	Yutaka Take	Katsuhiko Sumii	Yoshimi Ichikawa	2:01:3
2010	Danon Ballade	Yutaka Take	Yasuo Ikee	Danox	2:02:2
2011	Adam's Peak	Christophe Lemaire	Sei Ishizaka	Carrot Farm Co. Ltd.	2:02:4
2012	Epiphaneia	Yuichi Fukunaga	Katsuhiko Sumii	Carrot Farm Co. Ltd.	2:05:4
2013	One and Only	Christophe Lemaire	Kojiro Hashiguchi	North Hills	2:04.3
Hopeful Stakes (Grade 2) Nakayama Turf 2,000 metres, 2yo colts and fillies only
2014	Shining Lei	Yuga Kawada	Tomokazu Takano	U Carrot Farm	2:01.9
2015	Hartley	Hugh Bowman	Takahisa Tezuka	Sunday Racing Co. Ltd.	2:01.8
2016	Rey de Oro	Christophe Lemaire	Kazuo Fujisawa	U Carrot Farm	2:01.3
Hopeful Stakes (Grade 1) Nakayama Turf 2,000 metres, 2yo colts and fillies only
2017	Time Flyer	Cristian Demuro	Kunihide Matsuda	Sunday Racing Co. Ltd.	2:01.4
2018	Saturnalia	Mirco Demuro	Kazuya Nakatake	U Carrot Farm	2:01.6
2019	Contrail	Yuichi Fukunaga	Yoshito Yahagi	Shinji Maeda	2:01.4
2020	Danon The Kid	Yuga Kawada	Takayuki Yasuda	Danox	2:02.8
2021	Killer Ability	Takeshi Yokoyama	Takashi Saito	Carrot Farm Co. Ltd.	2:00.6
2022	Dura Erede	Bauyrzhan Murzabayev	Manabu Ikezoe	Three H Racing	2:01.5
2023	Regaleira	Christophe Lemaire	Tetsuya Kimura	Sunday Racing Co. Ltd.	2:00.2^{[a]}
2024	Croix du Nord	Yuichi Kitamura	Takashi Saito	Sunday Racing Co. Ltd.	2:00.5
2025	Lovcen	Kohei Matsuyama	Haruki Sugiyama	Forest Racing	2:01.0

^{a} Set the current race record with current race grade and distance (since 2014).

== See also ==
- Horse racing in Japan
- List of Japanese flat horse races
