= Kobe Shimbun Hai =

Horse race in Japan

Kobe Shimbun Hai 神戸新聞杯
- Meisho Tabaru winning the 2024 Kobe Shimbun Hai
- Class: Grade 2
- Location: Hanshin Racecourse
- Inaugurated: 1953
- Race type: Thoroughbred Flat racing

Race information
- Distance: 2400 metres
- Surface: Turf
- Track: Right-handed
- Qualification: 3-y-o colts and fillies
- Weight: 57 kg Allowance: Fillies 2 kg
- Purse: ¥ 117,540,000 (as of 2025): 1st: ¥ 54,000,000; 2nd: ¥ 22,000,000; 3rd: ¥ 14,000,000

The Kobe Shimbun Hai (Japanese 神戸新聞杯) is a Grade 2 flat horse race in Japan for three-year-old Thoroughbreds. It is run over a distance of 2400 metres at Hanshin Racecourse in Takarazuka, Hyogo, in September, but was contested over 2000 metres until 2006.

The Kobe Shimbun Hai was first run in 1953 and was elevated to Grade 2 status in 1984. It serves as a trial race for the Kikuka Sho. Winners of the race have included Deep Impact, Zenno Rob Roy, Orfevre, Gold Ship, and Contrail.

== Winners since 2000 ==
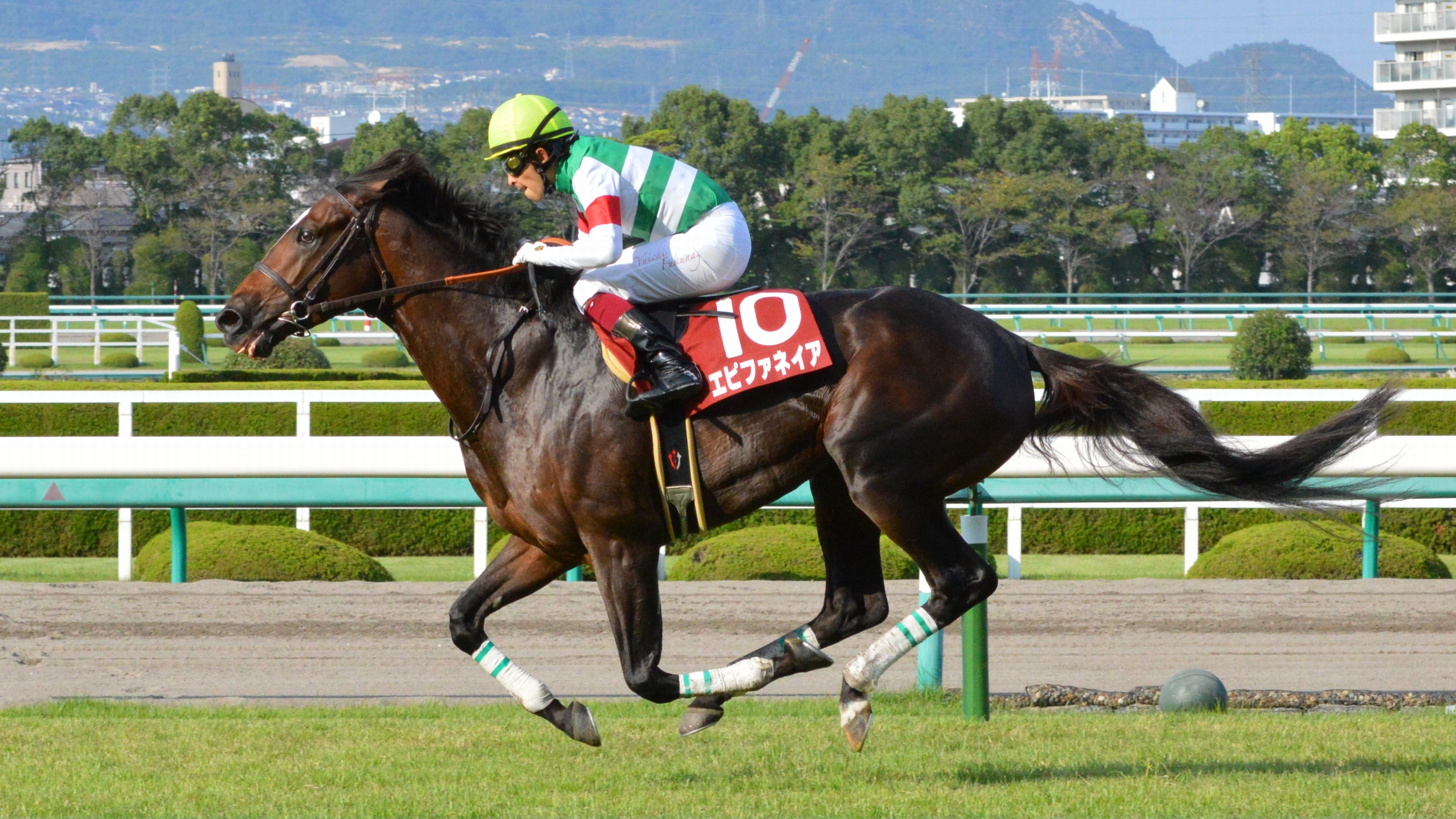
Epiphaneia winning the 2013 Kobe Shimbun Hai

Year	Winner	Jockey	Trainer	Owner	Time
2000	Fusaichi Sonic	Hirofumi Shii	Kunihide Matsuda	Fusao Sekiguchi	2:01.6
2001	Air Eminem	Mikio Matsunaga	Yuji Ito	Lucky Field	1:59.5
2002	Symboli Kris S	Yukio Okabe	Kazuo Fujisawa	Symboli Stud	1:59.1
2003	Zenno Rob Roy	Kent Desormeaux	Kazuo Fujisawa	Shinobu Osako	1:59.5
2004	King Kamehameha	Katsumi Ando	Kunihide Matsuda	Makoto Kaneko	1:59.0
2005	Deep Impact	Yutaka Take	Yasuo Ikee	Makoto Kaneko	1:58.4
2006	Dream Passport	Jun Takada	Hiroyoshi Matsuda	Joy Horse Racing	1:58.1
2007	Dream Journey	Yutaka Take	Yasutoshi Ikee	Sunday Racing	2:24.7
2008	Deep Sky	Hirofumi Shii	Mitsugu Kon	Toshio Fukami	2:25.3
2009	I Ko Piko	Hirofumi Shii	Masato Nishizono	Nishikioka Farm	2:24.2
2010	Rose Kingdom	Yutaka Take	Kojiro Hashiguchi	Sunday Racing	2:25.9
2011	Orfevre	Kenichi Ikezoe	Yasutoshi Ikee	Sunday Racing	2:28.3
2012	Gold Ship	Hiroyuki Uchida	Naosuke Sugai	Eiichi Kobayashi	2:25.2
2013	Epiphaneia	Yuichi Fukunaga	Katsuhiko Sumii	Carrot Farm	2:24.8
2014	One And Only	Norihiro Yokoyama	Kojiro Hashiguchi	Koji Maeda	2:24.4
2015	Lia Fail	Christophe Lemaire	Hidetaka Otonashi	Carrot Farm	2:26.7
2016	Satono Diamond	Christophe Lemaire	Yasutoshi Ikee	Hajime Satomi	2:25.7
2017	Rey de Oro	Christophe Lemaire	Kazuo Fujisawa	Carrot Farm	2:24.6
2018	Wagnerian	Kota Fujioka	Yasuo Tomomichi	Kaneko Makoto Holdings	2:25.6
2019	Saturnalia	Christophe Lemaire	Katsuhiko Sumii	Carrot Farm	2:26.8
2020	Contrail ^{[1]}	Yuichi Fukunaga	Yoshito Yahagi	Shinji Maeda	2:12.5
2021	Stella Veloce ^{[1]}	Hayato Yoshida	Naosuke Sugai	Tsuyoshi Ono	2:18.0
2022	Justin Palace ^{[1]}	Katsuma Sameshima	Haruki Sugiyama	Masahiro Miki	2:11.1
2023	Satono Glanz	Yuga Kawada	Yasuo Tomomichi	Hajime Satomi	2:23.5
2024	Meisho Tabaru ^{[1]}	Suguru Hamanaka	Mamoru Ishibashi	Yoshio Matsumoto	2:11.8
2025	Eri King	Yuga Kawada	Mitsumasa Nakauchida	Susumu Fujita	2:26.4
2026	Lovcen	Kohei Matsuyama	Haruki Sugiyama	Forest Racing	2:25.9

^{1} Races from 2020, 2022 and 2024 took place at Chukyo Racecourse over 2200 metres.

== Earlier winners ==
- 1953 - Wakakusa
- 1954 - Dainana Hoshu
- 1955 - Ken Shiyun
- 1956 - Tosamore
- 1957 - Miss Onward
- 1958 - Takaharu
- 1959 - Hatsurai
- 1960 - Queen Onward
- 1961 - Sugihime
- 1962 - Ryu Forel
- 1963 - Kouraio
- 1964 - Onward Second
- 1965 - Dai Koter
- 1966 - Hard It
- 1967 - Fuji Ace
- 1968 - Daiichi O
- 1969 - Uchuu O
- 1970 - New Pegasus
- 1971 - Nihon Pillow Moutiers
- 1972 - Tai Tehm
- 1973 - Hoshu Rich
- 1974 - Kitano Kachidoki
- 1975 - Tofuku Hope
- 1976 - Tosho Boy
- 1977 - Aino Crespin
- 1978 - Bambton Court
- 1979 - Nehi Jet
- 1980 - North Gust
- 1981 - Agnes Tesco
- 1982 - Hagino Kamuio
- 1983 - Suzuka Koban
- 1984 - Daizen Silver
- 1985 - Speed Hero
- 1986 - Takeno Komayoshi
- 1987 - Max Beauty
- 1988 - Yaeno Dia
- 1989 - Osaichi George
- 1990 - Center Shokatsu
- 1991 - Long Title
- 1992 - Kyoei Bowgun
- 1993 - Biwa Hayahide
- 1994 - Star Man
- 1995 - Tanino Create
- 1996 - Shirokita Cross
- 1997 - Matikanefukukitaru
- 1998 - Kenetoshi Governor
- 1999 - Osumi Bright

== See also ==
- Horse racing in Japan
- List of Japanese flat horse races
