= Aoba Sho =

Horse race in Japan

Aoba Sho 青葉賞
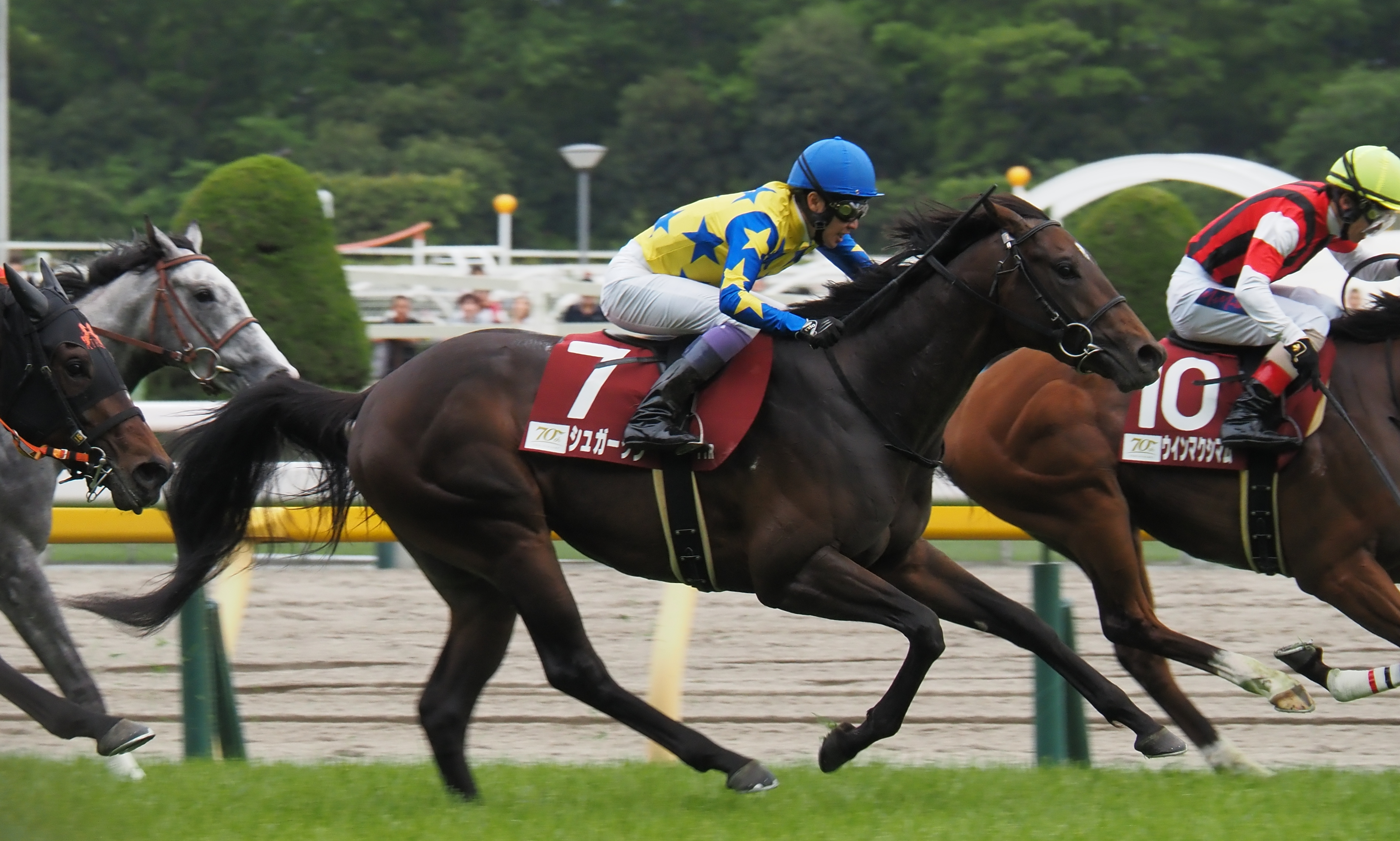
- 2024 Aoba Sho winner Sugar Kun
- Class: Grade 2
- Location: Tokyo Racecourse
- Race type: Thoroughbred Flat racing

Race information
- Distance: 2400 metres
- Surface: Turf
- Track: Left-handed
- Qualification: 3-y-o
- Weight: 57 kg Allowance: Fillies 2 kg
- Purse: ¥ 117,540,000 (as of 2025): 1st: ¥ 54,000,000; 2nd: ¥ 22,000,000; 3rd: ¥ 14,000,000

The Aoba Sho (Japanese 青葉賞) is a Japanese Grade 2 flat horse race in Japan for three-year-old Thoroughbreds. It is run over a distance of 2400 metres at Tokyo Racecourse in April.

The Aoba Sho was first run in 1984 and was elevated to Grade 3 status in 1994 before being promoted to Grade 2 in 2001. It serves as a trial race for the Tokyo Yushun, held in late May or early June. The Aoba Sho winner and second-placed horse are each awarded a slot for the race.

Among the winners of the race have been Symboli Kris S, Zenno Rob Roy and Fenomeno.

== Past winners ==
| Year | Winner | Jockey | Trainer | Owner | Time |
|---|---|---|---|---|---|
| 1984 | Lash and Go | Seiki Tabara | Minoru Kobayashi | Yusaku Iwasa | 2:32.3 |
| 1985 | Hamano Captain | Hiroyuki Gohara | Mitsugi Nakamura | Eijiro Tajima | 2:31.4 |
| 1986 | Sunny Light | Eizaburo Otsuka | Isamu Yoshino | Hideo Kuribayashi | 2:33.0 |
| 1987 | Chokai Fleet | Yasuo Sugawara | Yoshio Nakazumi | Kaichi Nitta | 2:27.6 |
| 1988 | Gakuen to Beat | Chiaki Sakai | Minetsugu Sawa | Akira Mitani | 2:28.9 |
| 1989 | Sir Pen Up | Masamitsu Tamura | Yoshimatsu Kaji | Kei Yoshihashi | 2:29.2 |
| 1990 | Bigmouth | Masato Shibata | Kunio Takamatsu | Hideto Furuoka | 2:28.2 |
| 1991 | Leo Durban | Yukio Okabe | Shinji Okuhira | Ryuu Tanaka | 2:27.6 |
| 1992 | Golden Zeus | Junichiro Oka | Masatoshi Ando | Shinji Maeda | 2:27.8 |
| 1993 | Stage Champ | Masayoshi Ebina | Susumu Yano | Hideto Furuoka | 2:27.7 |
| 1994 | Air Dublin | Yukio Okabe | Yuji Ito | Sadatoshi Yoshihara | 2:28.8 |
| 1995 | Summer Suspicion | Katsuharu Tanaka | Yasuhiro Suzuki | Shadai Race Horse | 2:25.8 |
| 1996 | Mountain Stone | Akira Takahashi | Katsutaro Sakai | Yuichi Yamaishi | 2:27.3 |
| 1997 | Tokio Excellent | Yutaka Yoshida | Yutaka Takahashi | Tokio Sakata | 2:29.2 |
| 1998 | Tayasu Again | Yoshitomi Shibata | Kenji Yamauchi | Kanichi Yokose | 2:27.6 |
| 1999 | Painted Black | Kazuhiro Kato | Yasuhiro Suzuki | Seiichi Iketani | 2:27.4 |
| 2000 | Carnegie Daian | Shinji Fujita | Hiroyoshi Matsuda | Toshikazu Higuchi | 2:28.2 |
| 2001 | Le Zele | Hiroki Goto | Yasuhito Tamura | Takashi Kurisaka | 2:26.9 |
| 2002 | Symboli Kris S | Yutaka Take | Kazuo Fujisawa | Symboli Stud | 2:26.4 |
| 2003 | Zenno Rob Roy | Norihiro Yokoyama | Kazuo Fujisawa | Shinobu Osako | 2:26.3 |
| 2004 | Higher Game | Masayoshi Ebina | Yokichi Okubo | Hiroyoshi Usuda | 2:24.1 |
| 2005 | Dantsu Kitcho | Shinji Fujita | Kenji Yamauchi | Tetsuji Yamamoto | 2:26.9 |
| 2006 | Admire Main | Yutaka Take | Mitsuru Hashida | Riichi Kondo | 2:25.3 |
| 2007 | Hiraboku Royal | Koshiro Take | Ryuji Okubo | Hirata Farm | 2:26.3 |
| 2008 | Admire Commando | Yuga Kawada | Mitsuru Hashida | Riichi Kondo | 2:26.9 |
| 2009 | Apres Un Reve | Hiroyuki Uchida | Yasuo Ikee | Sunday Racing | 2:26.2 |
| 2010 | Pelusa | Norihiro Yokoyama | Kazuo Fujisawa | Hidetoshi Yamamoto | 2:24.3 |
| 2011 | Win Variation | Katsumi Ando | Masahiro Matunaga | WIN | 2:28.8 |
| 2012 | Fenomeno | Masayoshi Ebina | Hirofumi Toda | Sunday Racing | 2:25.7 |
| 2013 | Hiraboku Deep | Masayoshi Ebina | Sakae Kunieda | Hirata Farm | 2:26.2 |
| 2014 | Shonan Lagoon | Yutaka Yoshida | Yokichi Okubo | Tetsuhide Kunimoto | 2:26.5 |
| 2015 | Reve Mistral | Yuga Kawada | Hiroyoshi Matsuda | Sunday Racing | 2:26.9 |
| 2016 | Vanquish Run | Hiroyuki Uchida | Katsuhiko Sumii | Takaya Shimada | 2:24.2 |
| 2017 | Admirable | Mirco Demuro | Hidetaka Otonashi | Eiko Kondo | 2:23.6 |
| 2018 | Go For The Summit | Masayoshi Ebina | Kazuo Fujisawa | Hidetoshi Yamamoto | 2:24.4 |
| 2019 | Lion Lion | Norihiro Yokoyama | Mikio Matsunaga | Chiyono Terada | 2:25.0 |
| 2020 | Authority | Lyle Hewitson | Tetsuya Kimura | Silk Racing | 2:23.0 (Note: Current race record) |
| 2021 | Wonderful Town | Ryuji Wada | Yoshitada Takahashi | Masahiro Mita | 2:25.2 |
| 2022 | Pradaria | Kenichi Ikezoe | Manabu Ikezoe | Nagoya Yuho CO., LTD | 2:24.2 |
| 2023 | Skilfing | Christophe Lemaire | Tetsuya Kimura | Carrot Farm | 2:23.9 |
| 2024 | Sugar Kun | Yutaka Take | Hisashi Shimizu | Yorikatsu Tsujiko | 2:24.2 |
| 2025 | Energico | Christophe Lemaire | Mizuki Takayanagi | Silk Racing | 2:24.8 |
| 2026 | Going to Sky | Yutaka Take | Yuki Uehara | Field Racing | 2:23.0 (Note: Current race record) |

== See also ==
- Horse racing in Japan
- List of Japanese flat horse races
