= World Premiere (horse) =

Japanese Thoroughbred racehorse

World Premiere ワールドプレミア
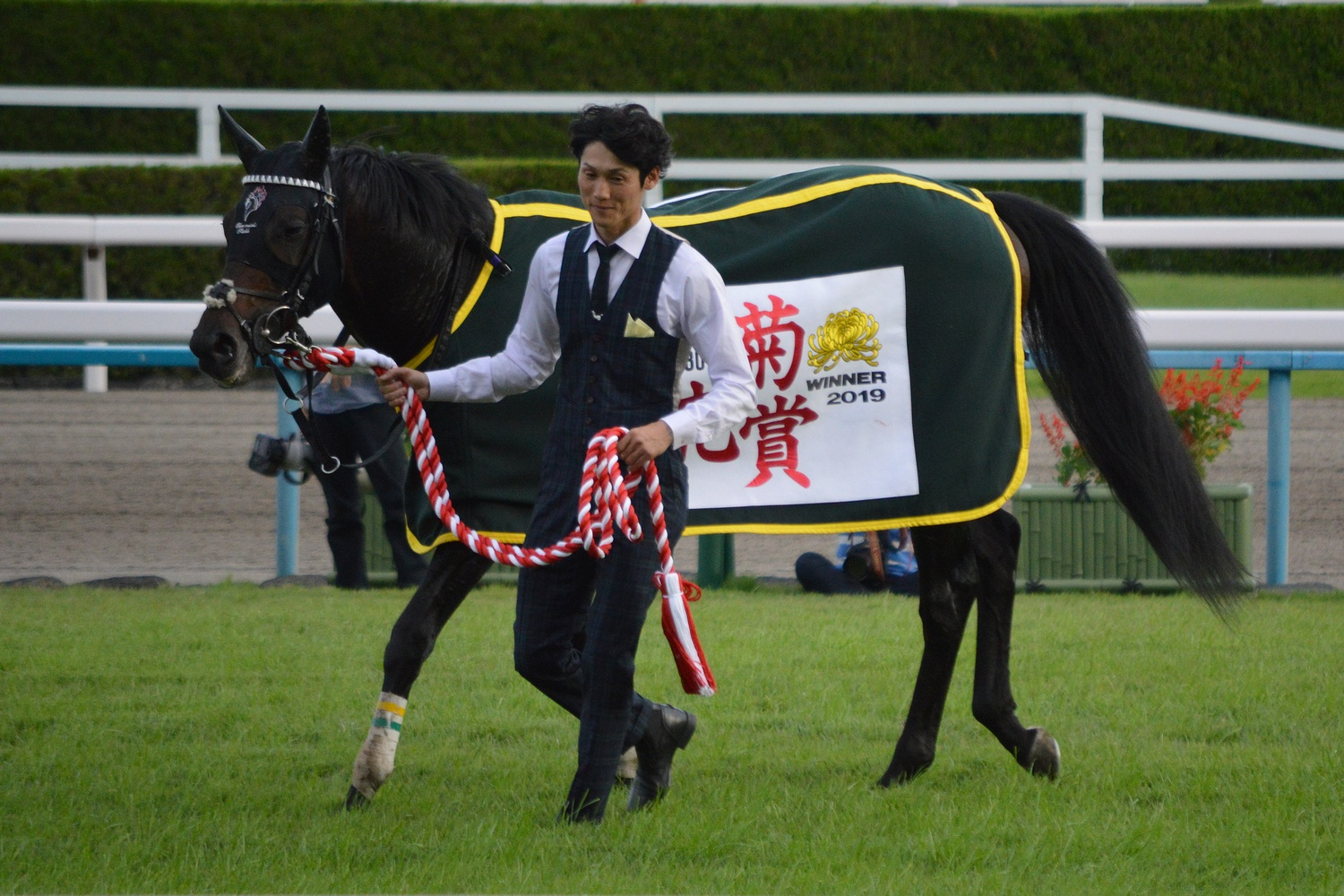
- World Premiere at the Kikuka Sho 2019
- Breed: Thoroughbred
- Sire: Deep Impact
- Grandsire: Sunday Silence
- Dam: Mandela
- Damsire: Acatenango
- Sex: Stallion
- Foaled: 1 February 2016
- Country: Japan
- Colour: Dark bay or brown
- Breeder: Northern Farm
- Owner: Ryoichi Otsuka
- Racing colours
- Trainer: Yasuo Tomomichi
- Jockey: Yutaka Take; Yuichi Fukunaga
- Record: 12: 4-1-4
- Earnings: ¥455,943,000

Major wins
- Tenno Sho (Spring) (2021); Japanese Classic Race wins: Kikuka Sho (2019)

World Premiere (Japanese: ワールドプレミア, Hepburn: Wārudo Puremia; foaled 1 February 2016) is a Japanese Thoroughbred racehorse. As a juvenile in 2018 he showed promise by winning his first race and then running third in the Kyoto Nisai Stakes. In the following year he won on his seasonal debut and finished second on his next appearance before being sidelined by injury. He returned in the autumn to run second in the Kobe Shimbun Hai before winning the Kikuka Sho and finishing third in the Arima Kinen. He missed most of the following season, making only two appearances in late autumn. In 2021 he ran third on his seasonal debut and then won the spring edition of the Tenno Sho.

== Background ==
World Premiere is a dark bay or brown colt bred in Hokkaido by Northern Farm. As a foal in 2016 he was consigned to the JRA Select Sale and was bought for ¥259.2 million by Ryoichi Otsuka. The colt was sent into training with Yasuo Tomomichi.

He was from the ninth crop of foals sired by Deep Impact, who was the Japanese Horse of the Year in 2005 and 2006, winning races including the Tokyo Yushun, Tenno Sho, Arima Kinen and Japan Cup. Deep Impact's other progeny include Gentildonna, Harp Star, Kizuna, A Shin Hikari, Marialite and Saxon Warrior.

World Premiere's dam Mandela showed considerable racing ability, winning the Diana-Trial and finishing third in both the Preis der Diana and the Prix de Pomone, and was exported to Japan after being sold for $1.4 million at Keeneland in 2007. Her other foals have included World Ace, who won the Kisaragi Sho and the Yomiuri Milers Cup, as well as Weltreisende, who won the Naruo Kinen and Nikkei Shinshun Hai. As a daughter of the broodmare Mandellicht, she was a half-sister to Manduro.

== Racing career ==
=== 2018: two-year-old season ===
World Premiere made his debut on 21 October in a contest for previously unraced juveniles over 1800 metres at Kyoto Racecourse and won from Meisho Tengen (a colt who went on to win the Yayoi Sho). On 24 November the colt was stepped up in class for the Grade 3 Kyoto Nisai Stakes over 2000 metres at the same track and started at odds of 2.4/1 in an eight-runner field. He was restrained towards the rear of the field before making progress in the straight and came home third behind Courageux Guerrier and Breaking Dawn, beaten four lengths by the winner.

In the official ratings for Japanese two-year-olds, World Premiere was awarded a mark of 102, fourteen pounds behind the top-rated Admire Mars.

=== 2019: three-year-old season ===
World Premiere made a successful start to his second season when he defeated Unicorn Lion and six others in the Tsubaki Sho over 1800 metres at Kyoto on 16 February. At Hanshin Racecourse a month later he ran second to Velox in the Listed Wakaba Stakes over 2000 metres. The performance qualified him to run in the Satsuki Sho but a "bucked shin" kept him off the track until the autumn.

After a break of more than six months World Premiere returned in the Grade 2 Kobe Shimbun Hai (a major trial race for the Kikuka Sho) over 2400 metres at Hanshin on 22 September. Ridden as in all his previous starts by Yutaka Take he started at odds of 12.2/1 and finished third behind Saturnalia and Velox. After the race Yasuo Tomomichi commented "He sweated up a bit in the paddock last time and wasn't so relaxed, but in the race itself he ran well, finishing strongly, so I was pleased with that".

On 20 October World Premiere, with Take in the saddle, was one of eighteen three-year-olds to contest the 80th running of the Kikuka Sho over 3000 metres at Kyoto Racecourse. He was made the 5.5/1 third choice in the betting behind Velox and Nishino Daisy (Tokyo Sports Hai Nisai Stakes) while the other contenders included Red Genial (Kyoto Shimbun Hai), Unicorn Lion and Meisho Tengen. World Premiere started quickly but was then restrained by Take and settled behind the leaders on the rails as the outsider Caudillo set a steady pace. Take made a forward move entering the straight and World Premiere gained the advantage 200 metres out before holding off the late challenge of Satono Lux by a neck with Velox a length away in third place. Take commented "He was a bit keen at first but was in hand nicely during the race. He wasn’t able to run in the first two of the Triple Crown races so I am glad that he was able to claim the last one. He’s still got a lot to improve so I’m looking forward to his future races." Tomomichi added "He's recovered over the summer from his spring campaign of races, and it's good he's had the one recent run to sharpen him up. While he can misbehave a little, he seems to have improved on this front, and in some ways, I think this is actually good for him".

For his final run of the year, World Premiere was matched against older horses in the Arima Kinen over 2500 metres at Nakayama Racecourse on 22 December. He raced towards the rear of the field before staying on strongly in the straight to take third place behind Lys Gracieux and Saturnalia.

In January 2020, at the JRA Awards for 2019, World Premiere finished fifth in the poll for the Best Three-Year-Old Colt.

=== 2020: four-year-old season ===
World Premiere's main targets in the early part of 2020 were the spring edition of the Tenno Sho and the Takarazuka Kinen but after the colt showing unsatisfactory performances in training (he was reportedly "favoring his right foreleg") Yasuo Tomomichi opted to reserve him for an autumn campaign.

After an absence of more than eleven months, World Premiere returned to the track for the Japan Cup over 2400 metres at Tokyo Racecourse on 29 November. Starting a 44.4/1 outsider he raced on the inside before making steady progress in the straight to come home sixth of the fifteen runners, five lengths behind the winner Almond Eye. After the race Tomoichi commented "He was worked up on race day, no doubt due to the time between races. Considering the lineup and that he was back from a layoff, I think he did exceptionally well." The colt ended his season with a second attempt to win the Arima Kinen on 27 December when he started the 12.5/1 fifth choice in the betting and dead-heated for fifth place with Curren Bouquetd'or three and a half lengths behind the winner Chrono Genesis.

In the 2020 World's Best Racehorse Rankings, World Premiere was rated on 118, making him the equal 80th best racehorse in the world.

=== 2021: five-year-old season ===
In this year, World Premiere received an invitation for Dubai Sheema Classic but opting in for the Nikkei Sho instead for the preparation of the Tenno Sho Spring. He was supposed to stick with Take as his jockey for this race but as Take suffered a fracture, Shu Ishibashi replaced him instead. In the race, he ran in middle pack and made a move around the outside corners and chased Curren Bouquetd'or and Win Marilyn but it was not enough and he finished third that day. On May 2, He was confirmed to join the Tenno Sho Spring. This time, he was jockeyed by Yuichi Fukunaga. This time Take took the reign on Divine Force in the same race. The race this time was held in Hanshin instead of Kyoto due to the racetrack renovation since November 2020. World Premiere started the race from gate one but was soon well placed on the rail about eight lengths behind the race leaders as they passed the grandstand on the first circuit. The leaders who were Curren Bouquetd'or and also Deep Bond race against each other until the final furlong where World Premiere rushed forward and surpassed both of them. Deep Bond tried to follow but failed at the line as World Premiere won the race by three quarters of a length.

After the win, he skipped the Takarazuka Kinen for an early rest in preparation for the autumn campaign. With the goal setting up for the Japan Cup, World Premiere begins this campaign with the Tenno Sho Autumn race. With Yasunari Iwata at the helm, they had a bad performance in this race as they finished eleventh due to bad start and being boxed early in the race. The goal for Japan Cup also not being materialized after this because he was not physically fit for the race. He was retired soon after this. His trainer, Tomomichi said that World Premiere was a great horse with great stamina shown by his two G1 win which both are long distance courses (Kikuka Sho and Tenno Sho Spring) and hoped that trait will be passing on when he became a stud.

== Racing form ==
Below data is based on data available on JBIS Search and netkeiba.com.

Date	Track	Race	Grade	Distance (Condition)	Entry	HN	Odds (Favored)	Finish	Time	Margins	Jockey	Winner (Runner-up)
2018 – two-year-old season
Oct 21	Kyoto	2yo Debut		1,800 m (Firm)	13	9	1.8 (1)	1st	1:48.0	0.0	Yutaka Take	(Meisho Tengen)
Nov 24	Kyoto	Kyoto Nisai Stakes	3	2,000 m (Firm)	9	2	3.4 (2)	3rd	2:02.2	0.7	Yutaka Take	Courageux Guerrier
2019 – three-year-old season
Feb 16	Kyoto	Tsubaki Sho	ALW (1W)	1,800 m (Firm)	8	1	4.5 (2)	1st	1:47.3	–0.2	Yutaka Take	(Unicorn Lion)
Mar 16	Hanshin	Wakaba Stakes	L	2,000 m (Good)	10	4	3.2 (2)	2nd	2:02.6	0.5	Yutaka Take	Velox
Sep 22	Hanshin	Kobe Shimbun Hai	2	2,400 m (Firm)	8	8	13.2 (3)	3rd	2:27.5	0.7	Yutaka Take	Saturnalia
Oct 20	Kyoto	Kikuka Sho	1	3,000 m (Firm)	18	5	6.5 (3)	1st	3:06.0	0.0	Yutaka Take	(Satono Lux)
Dec 22	Nakayama	Arima Kinen	1	2,500 m (Firm)	16	7	13.4 (4)	3rd	2:31.4	0.9	Yutaka Take	Lys Gracieux
2020 – four-year-old season
Nov 29	Tokyo	Japan Cup	1	2,400 m (Firm)	15	3	45.4 (7)	6th	2:23.8	0.8	Yutaka Take	Almond Eye
Dec 27	Nakayama	Arima Kinen	1	2,500 m (Firm)	16	5	13.5 (5)	5th	2:35.6	0.6	Yutaka Take	Chrono Genesis
2021 – five-year-old season
Mar 27	Nakayama	Nikkei Sho	2	2,500 m (Firm)	15	2	5.0 (2)	3rd	2:33.4	0.1	Shu Ishibashi	Win Marilyn
May 2	Hanshin	Tenno Sho (Spring)	1	3,200 m (Firm)	17	1	5.2 (3)	1st	3:14.7	–0.1	Yuichi Fukunaga	(Deep Bond)
Oct 31	Tokyo	Tenno Sho (Autumn)	1	2,000 m (Firm)	16	7	30.2 (6)	11th	1:59.1	1.2	Yasunari Iwata	Efforia

Legend:
Turf

== Stud record ==
World Premiere started his stud duty in 2022 at Yushun Stallion Station for a fee of 500,000 JPY.

=== Notable progeny ===
Below data is based on JBIS Stallion Reports.

c = colt, f = filly

bold = grade 1 stakes

**Foaled**	**Name**	**Sex**	**Major Wins**
2023	Lovcen	c	**Hopeful Stakes** (2025), **Satsuki Shō** (2026), **Tokyo Yushun** (2026), Kobe Shimbun Hai (2026)

== Pedigree ==
Pedigree of World Premiere (JPN), dark bay or brown colt, 2016
Sire Deep Impact (JPN) 2002	Sunday Silence (USA); 1986	Halo	Hail to Reason
Sire Deep Impact (JPN) 2002	Sunday Silence (USA); 1986	Halo	Cosmah
Sire Deep Impact (JPN) 2002	Sunday Silence (USA); 1986	Wishing Well	Understanding
Sire Deep Impact (JPN) 2002	Sunday Silence (USA); 1986	Wishing Well	Mountain Flower
Sire Deep Impact (JPN) 2002	Wind in Her Hair (IRE); 1991	Alzao (USA)	Lyphard
Sire Deep Impact (JPN) 2002	Wind in Her Hair (IRE); 1991	Alzao (USA)	Lady Rebecca (GB)
Sire Deep Impact (JPN) 2002	Wind in Her Hair (IRE); 1991	Burghclere (GB)	Busted
Sire Deep Impact (JPN) 2002	Wind in Her Hair (IRE); 1991	Burghclere (GB)	Highclere
Dam Mandela (GER) 2000	Acatenango (GER); 1982	Surumu	Literat
Dam Mandela (GER) 2000	Acatenango (GER); 1982	Surumu	Surama
Dam Mandela (GER) 2000	Acatenango (GER); 1982	Aggravate (GB)	Aggressor
Dam Mandela (GER) 2000	Acatenango (GER); 1982	Aggravate (GB)	Raven Locks
Dam Mandela (GER) 2000	Mandellicht (IRE); 1994	Be My Guest (USA)	Northern Dancer (CAN)
Dam Mandela (GER) 2000	Mandellicht (IRE); 1994	Be My Guest (USA)	What A Treat
Dam Mandela (GER) 2000	Mandellicht (IRE); 1994	Mandelauge (GER)	Elektrant
Dam Mandela (GER) 2000	Mandellicht (IRE); 1994	Mandelauge (GER)	Mandriale (Family: 3-d)
