= Yasuo Tomomichi =

Japanese horse trainer

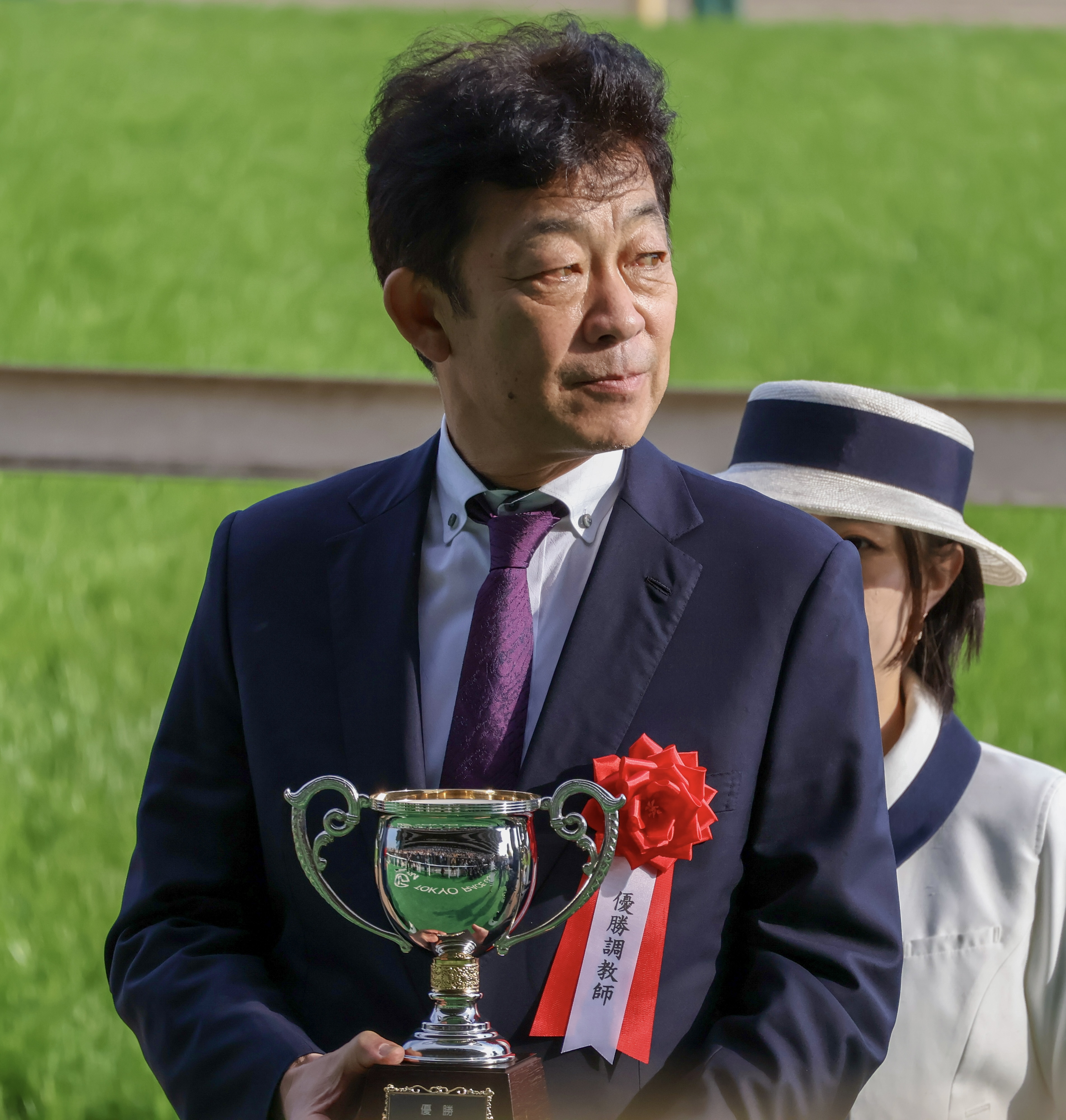
- Tomomichi at the Flora Stakes in 2025

Personal information
- Native name: 友道康夫
- Nationality: Japanese
- Born: August 11, 1963 (age 63) Akō, Hyōgo
- Occupation: Horse trainer

Horse racing career
- Sport: Horse racing

Significant horses
- Verxina, Makahiki, Cheval Grand, Vivlos, Wagnerian, Admire Mars, World Premiere, Potager, Do Deuce, Justin Milano, Admire Zoom, Kamunyak

Yasuo Tomomichi (友道康夫; born August 11, 1963) is a Japanese horse trainer of the Japan Racing Association.

== Career ==
Tomomichi was born in the Sakoshi district of Akō, Hyōgo. After graduating from Hyogo Prefectural Ako High School in 1982, he enrolled in the Osaka Prefecture University's School of Veterinary Medicine to become a veterinarian, and joined the University's Equestrian Club. As part of the Club's activity, he took up a part time job as a security guard at a horse racing track, which is where Tomomichi was introduced to the world of horse racing.

After working as a groom and assistant trainer at the stables of Kuniichi Asami and Kunihide Matsuda, Tomomichi obtained a Trainer license in 2001 before opening his own stable at the Ritto Training Center in 2002. Tomomichi scored his first win on December 1 of that year when Inter Marvelous won an allowance race at Chukyo Racecourse.

Tomomichi won his first graded race when One More Chatter won the Asahi Challenge Cup in 2005.

In 2008, Tomomichi won his first GI race when Admire Jupiter won the Tenno Sho (Spring).

In 2016, Tomomichi won the Tōkyō Yūshun (Japanese Derby) with Makahiki.

== Personal life ==
Tomomichi has a son named Yuichi, who is an assistant trainer at the Daisuke Takayanagi stable.

== Major wins ==
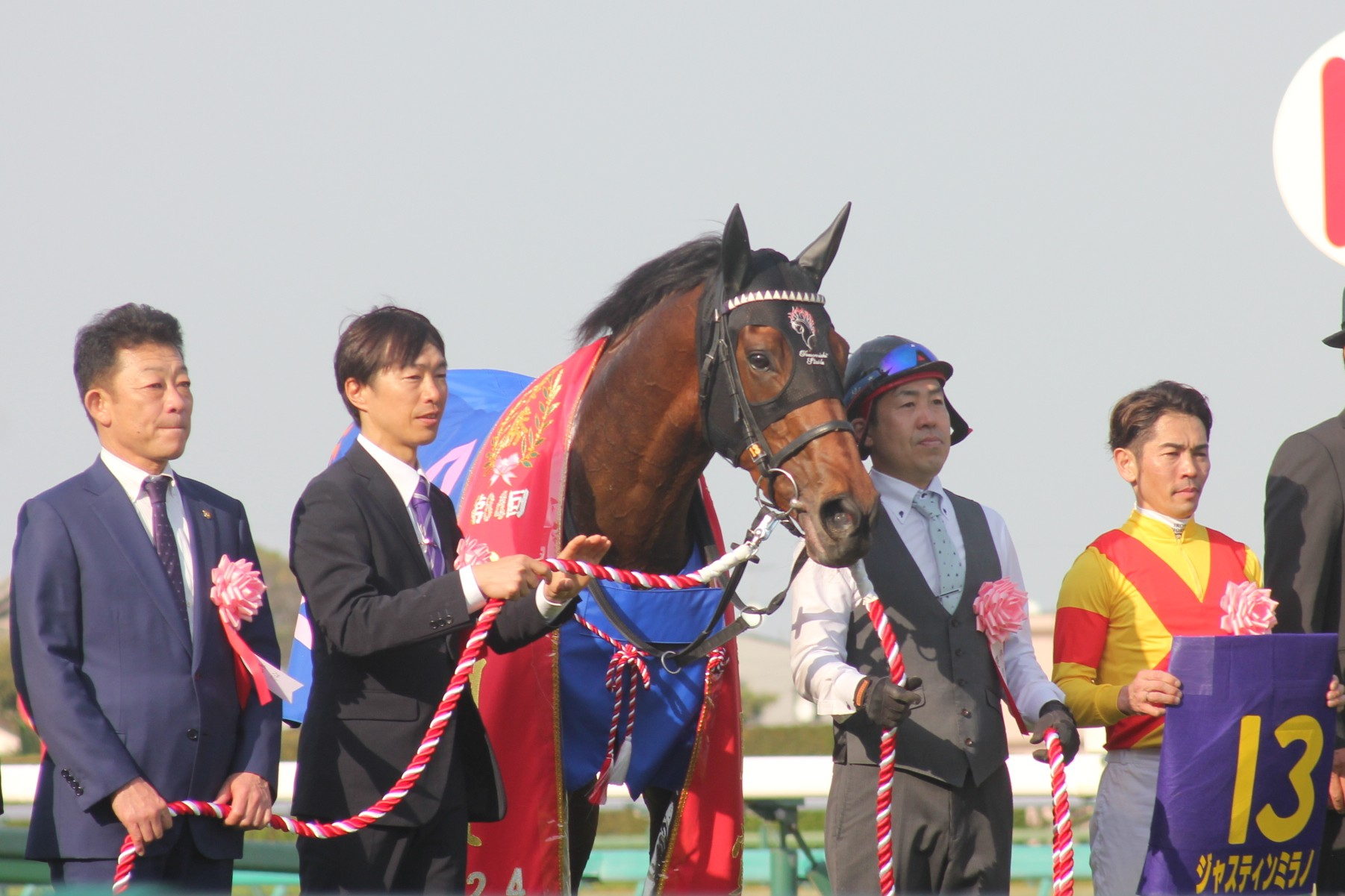
Tomomichi (far left) with Justin Milano at the Satsuki Sho ceremony

Japan

- Arima Kinen - (1) - Do Deuce (2023)
- Asahi Hai Futurity Stakes - (3) - Admire Mars (2018), Do Deuce (2021), Admire Zoom (2024)
- Champions Cup - (1) - Jun Light Bolt (2022)
- Japan Cup - (2) - Cheval Grand (2017), Do Deuce (2024)
- Kikuka-shō - (1) - World Premiere (2019)
- NHK Mile Cup - (2) - Clarity Sky (2015), Admire Mars (2019)
- Ōsaka Hai - (1) - Potager (2022)
- Satsuki Shō - (2) - Unrivaled (2009), Justin Milano (2024)
- Shūka Sho - (1) - Vivlos (2016)
- Tenno Sho (Autumn) - (1) - Do Deuce (2024)
- Tenno Sho (Spring) - (2) - Admire Jupiter (2008), World Premiere (2021)
- Tōkyō Yūshun - (3) - Makahiki (2016), Wagnerian (2018), Do Deuce (2022)
- Victoria Mile - (2) - Verxina (2013, 2014)
- Yushun Himba - (1) - Kamunyak (2025)

Hong Kong

- Hong Kong Mile - (1) - Admire Mars (2019)

(United Arab Emirates) UAE

- Dubai Turf - (1) - Vivlos (2017)
