= Admire Terra =

Japanese Thoroughbred racehorse (foaled 2021)

Admire Terra アドマイヤテラ
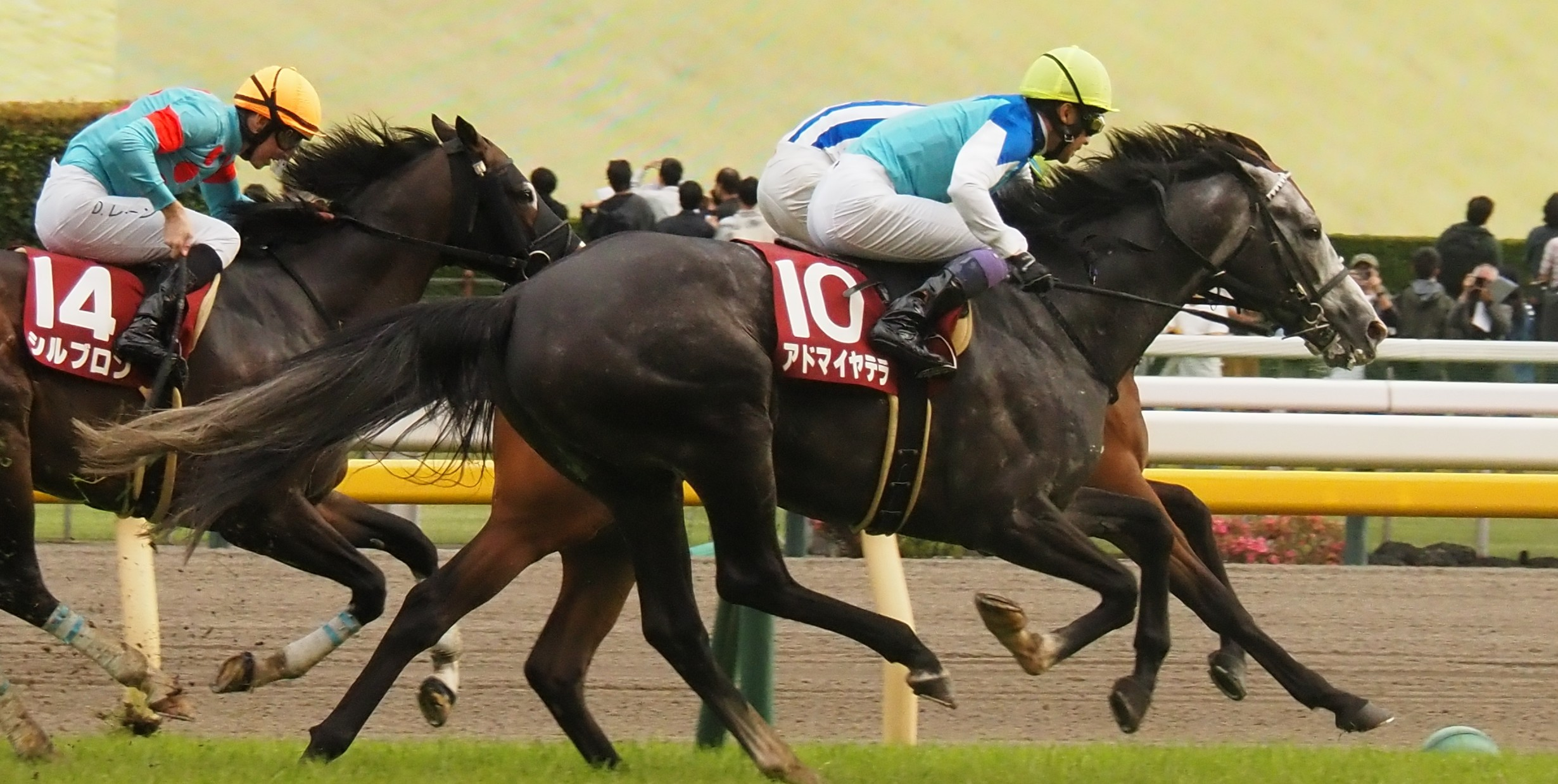
- Admire Terra at the 2025 Meguro Kinen
- Breed: Thoroughbred
- Sire: Rey de Oro
- Grandsire: King Kamehameha
- Dam: Admire Miyabi
- Damsire: Heart's Cry
- Sex: Colt
- Foaled: 7 February 2021
- Country: Japan
- Colour: Grey
- Breeder: Northern Farm
- Owner: Junko Kondo
- Racing colours
- Trainer: Yasuo Tomomichi
- Jockey: Yutaka Take; Yuga Kawada
- Record: 16: 6-1-2
- Earnings: ¥338,259,000

Major wins
- Meguro Kinen (2025); Hanshin Daishoten (2026)

Admire Terra (Japanese: アドマイヤテラ, Hepburn: Adomaiya Tera; foaled 7 February 2021) is a Japanese Thoroughbred racehorse. He has competed since 2023, recording six wins in fourteen starts, including the Meguro Kinen (GII) in 2025 and the Hanshin Daishoten (GII) in 2026. His racing name combines the "Admire" prefix used by owner Junko Kondo with "Terra," the Latin word for "Earth."

== Background ==
Admire Terra is a grey colt bred in Abira, Hokkaido, by Northern Farm. He was sired by Rey de Oro, a son of King Kamehameha, and his dam was Admire Miyabi, a daughter of Heart's Cry who won the 2017 Queen Cup (GIII). His fourth dam, Wind in Her Hair, is the winner of the 1995 Aral-Pokal and also is the dam of Deep Impact. He is owned by Junko Kondo and sent into training with Yasuo Tomomichi at the JRA's Ritto Training Center.

== Racing career ==
=== 2023: two-year-old season ===
Admire Terra debuted on November 19, in a maiden race on the turf at Kyoto Racecourse. The horse was initially supposed to be ridden by Ryan Moore, but due to a fall which he suffered mid-race earlier that day, he was instead ridden by Yuga Kawada, who would win the race by 1.75 lengths.

=== 2024: three-year-old season ===
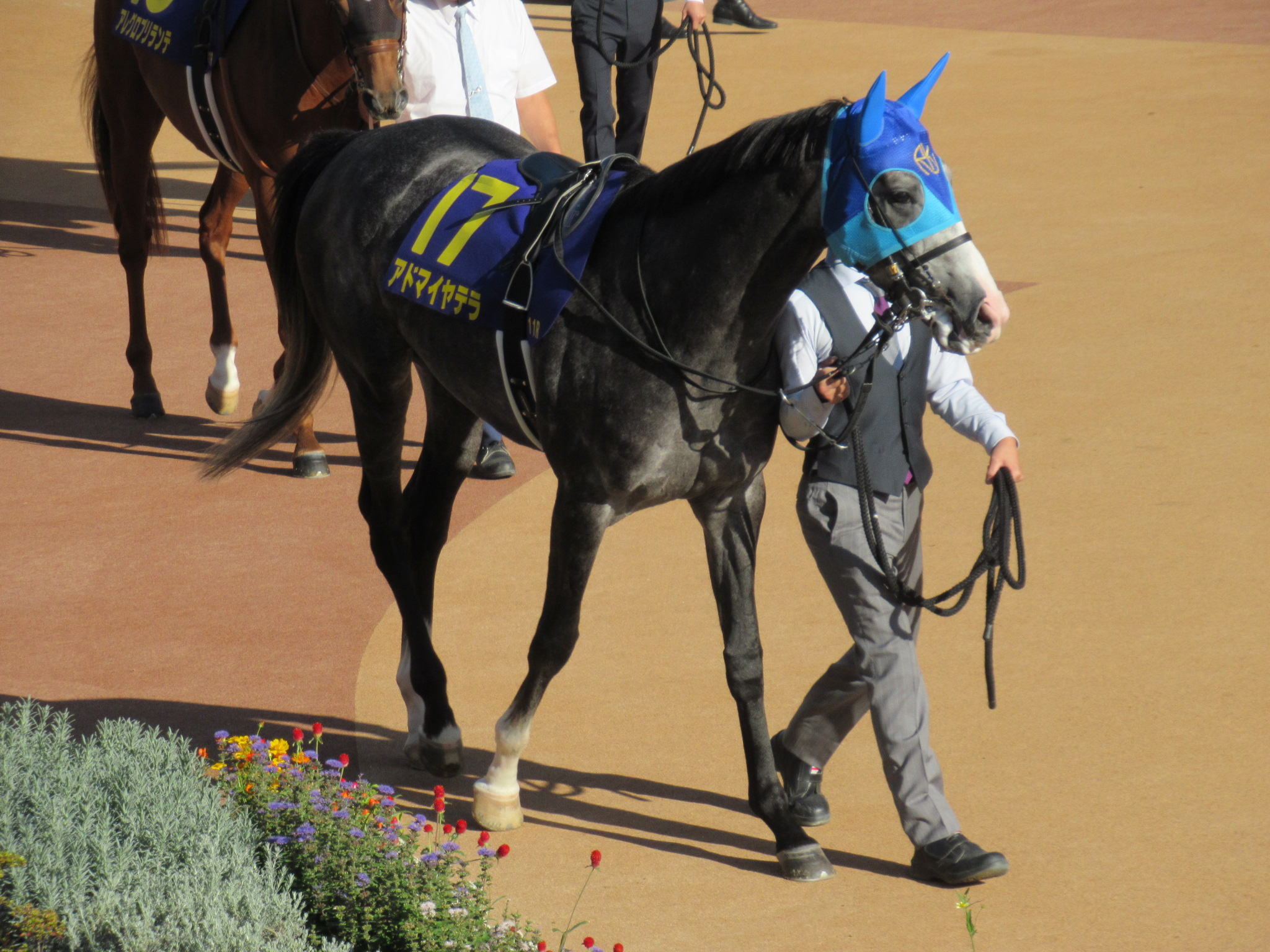
Admire Terra at the parade ring for the Kikuka Shō

Admire Terra won a one-win class race at Kyoto on January 7, 2024. He finished fourth in the Wakaba Stakes (Listed) at Hanshin Racecourse in March and fourth in the Kyoto Shimbun Hai (GII) at Kyoto in May, failing to qualify for the spring classics. He finished second in the Akanko Tokubetsu (Allowance) at Sapporo Racecourse in July and won the Chausuyama Kogen Tokubetsu (Allowance) at Chukyo Racecourse in September. He finished third in the Kikuka Shō (GI) at Kyoto in October, beaten 0.4 seconds by Urban Chic.

=== 2025: four-year-old season ===
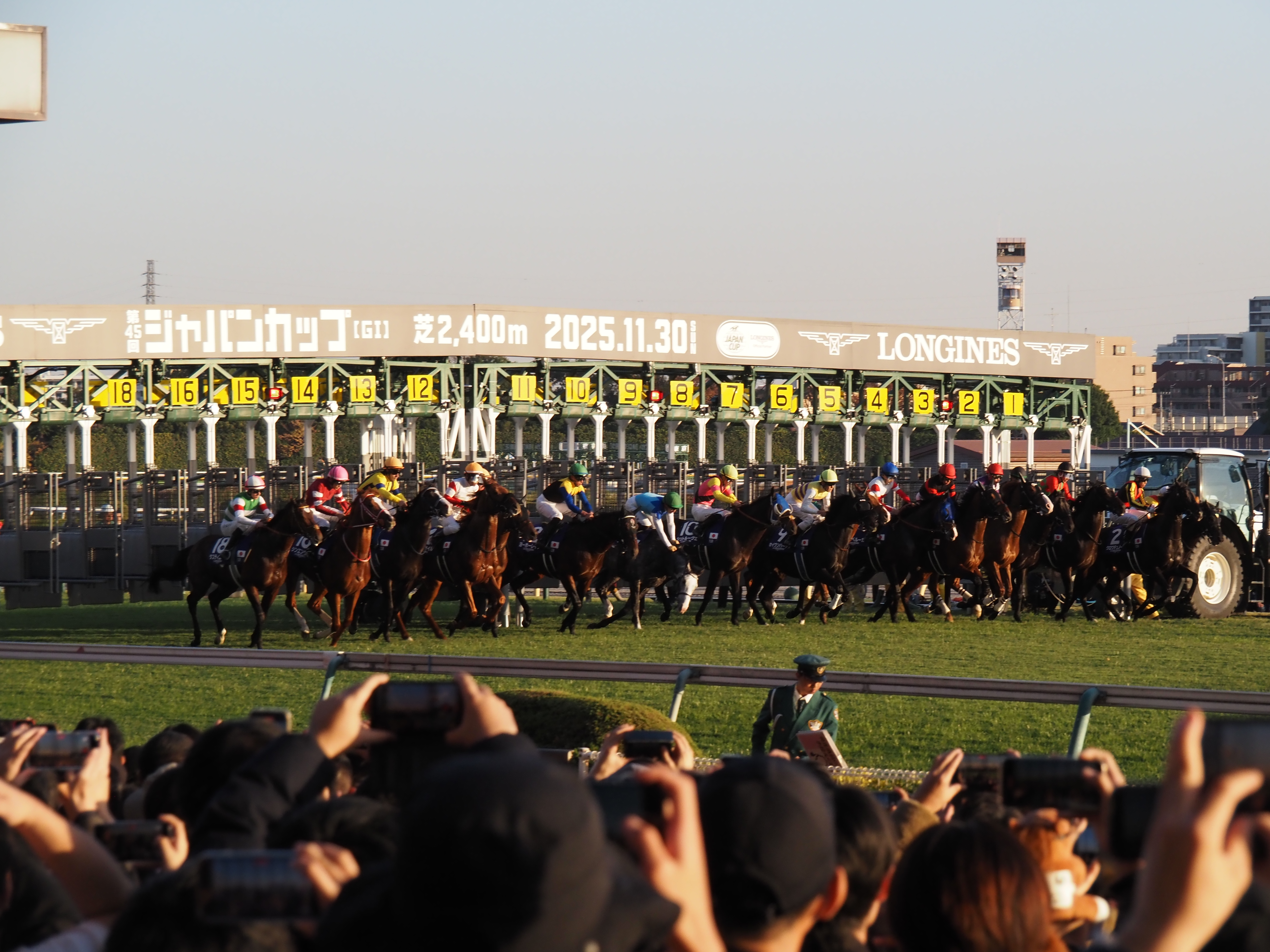
The start of the 2025 Japan Cup, with Admire Terra (center) about to unseat Kawada

Admire Terra won the Osaka-Hamburg Cup (Open) at Hanshin in April. On June 1, he won the Meguro Kinen (GII) at Tokyo Racecourse, defeating Ho Elite by a neck, recording his first graded stakes victory. He finished fourth in the Kyoto Daishoten (GII) at Kyoto in October.

On November 30, he contested the Japan Cup (GI) at Tokyo. However, at the start his jockey Yuga Kawada was unseated, and Admire Terra continued as a riderless horse, crossing the finish line first ahead of Calandagan and Masquerade Ball. However, as a riderless horse, he was not officially placed in the race. He finished eleventh in the Arima Kinen (GI) at Nakayama Racecourse in December.

=== 2026: five-year-old season ===
On March 22, Admire Terra won the Hanshin Daishoten (GII) at Hanshin in a race-record time of 3:02.0. On May 3, he finished third in the Tennō Shō (Spring, GI) at Kyoto, beaten by 0.1 seconds by Croix du Nord.

After a summer break, Admire Terra is scheduled to run the Prix de l'Arc de Triomphe in France after running the Sapporo Kinen in August. Yutaka Take was initially planned to ride the horse at Sapporo; but following the announcement that Take would ride Sixpence at Prix Jacques Le Marois instead, it was announced that Ryusei Sakai would ride Admire Terra instead. In the race, the horse started well but he suddenly made a move at the backstretch into second position. He was jostling with several horses before gassing up after the fourth corner. He touched the finish line in ninth place. Sakai admitted that he pushed the horse to the front when the pace started to slow down. This move made him run out of energy in the final phase. Sakai also stated that the horse was better suited to a longer race. His trainer, Tomomichi, agreed that the 2000 metres pace did not suit him, but this result would not affect their possible plan for the Prix de l'Arc de Triomphe. On the race day, he would start the race from gate 12 and ridden by a new jockey, Cristian Demuro. In this race, Demuro ride him prominently in the middle pack but as they entered the homestretch, his strides was weakened, he fell out of the order as he crossed the finish line in 11th place six length behind. In the post-race, trainer Tomomichi was glad that the horse was able to run as they planned despite he gassed out in the end and put a target of his next race on the Arima Kinen in the end of year.

== Statistics ==
The following table details all 16 starts of Admire Terra's racing career based on official netkeiba and JBIS records. Record current as of 4 October 2026.

Date	Distance (Condition)	Race	Class	Course	Odds (Favourite)	Field	Finish	Time	Jockey	Winning (Losing) Margin	Winner (2nd Place)	Ref
2023 – two-year-old season
Nov 19	Turf 2000 m (Good)	2-Y-O Newcomer	Maiden	Kyoto	6.9 (5th)	7	1st	2:03.3	Yuga Kawada	–0.3	(Win Liberale)	
2024 – three-year-old season
Jan 7	Turf 2000 m (Firm)	3-Y-O 1-Win Class	Allowance	Kyoto	2.7 (1st)	9	1st	2:02.8	Yuga Kawada	–0.4	(Namura Ahab)	
Mar 16	Turf 2000 m (Firm)	Wakaba Stakes	Listed	Hanshin	4.0 (3rd)	9	4th	2:00.0	Mirai Iwata	0.3	Mr G T	
May 4	Turf 2200 m (Firm)	Kyoto Shimbun Hai	GII	Kyoto	11.6 (6th)	15	4th	2:11.7	Mirco Demuro	0.5	June Take	
Jul 28	Turf 2600 m (Good)	Akanko Tokubetsu	Allowance	Sapporo	1.5 (1st)	12	2nd	2:41.0	Christophe Lemaire	0.7	Aster Bugie	
Sep 15	Turf 2200 m (Good)	Chausuyama Kogen Tokubetsu	Allowance	Chukyo	1.5 (1st)	10	1st	2:12.4	Christophe Lemaire	–0.3	(Namura Hooker)	
Oct 20	Turf 3000 m (Firm)	Kikuka Shō	GI	Kyoto	23.6 (7th)	18	3rd	3:04.5	Yutaka Take	0.4	Urban Chic	
2025 – four-year-old season
Apr 13	Turf 2600 m (Good)	Osaka-Hamburg Cup	Open	Hanshin	2.4 (1st)	11	1st	2:39.8	Yutaka Take	–0.1	(Nishino Revenant)	
Jun 1	Turf 2500 m (Firm)	Meguro Kinen	GII	Tokyo	3.3 (1st)	18	1st	2:32.9	Yutaka Take	0.0	(Hohelied)	
Oct 5	Turf 2400 m (Good)	Kyōto Daishōten	GII	Kyoto	3.1 (1st)	18	4th	2:24.2	Yuga Kawada	0.3	Deep Monster	
Nov 30	Turf 2400 m (Firm)	Japan Cup	GI	Tokyo	46.1 (10th)	17	DNF	–	Yuga Kawada	–	Calandagan	
Dec 28	Turf 2500 m (Firm)	Arima Kinen	GI	Nakayama	50.3 (9th)	16	11th	2:32.4	Yuga Kawada	0.9	Museum Mile	
2026 – five-year-old season
Mar 22	Turf 3000 m (Firm)	Hanshin Daishōten	GII	Hanshin	3.1 (1st)	10	1st	R3:02.0	Yutaka Take	–0.5	(Aqua Vernal)	
May 3	Turf 3200 m (Firm)	Tennō Shō (Spring)	GI	Kyoto	3.0 (2nd)	15	3rd	3:13.8	Yutaka Take	0.1	Croix du Nord	
Aug 16	Turf 2000 m (Firm)	Sapporo Kinen	GII	Sapporo	4.4 (2nd)	16	9th	1:59.4	Ryusei Sakai	1.2	Shake Your Heart	
Oct 4	Turf 2400 m (Good to Soft)	Prix de l'Arc de Triomphe	GI	Longchamp	66/1 (13th)	16	11th	2:28.0	Cristian Demuro	0.9	Daryz	

== Pedigree ==
Pedigree of Admire Terra (JPN)
Sire Rey de Oro (JPN) 2014	King Kamehameha (JPN); 2001	Kingmambo	Mr. Prospector
Sire Rey de Oro (JPN) 2014	King Kamehameha (JPN); 2001	Kingmambo	Miesque
Sire Rey de Oro (JPN) 2014	King Kamehameha (JPN); 2001	Manfath	Last Tycoon
Sire Rey de Oro (JPN) 2014	King Kamehameha (JPN); 2001	Manfath	Pilot Bird
Sire Rey de Oro (JPN) 2014	Radlada (JPN); 2006	Symboli Kris S	Kris S.
Sire Rey de Oro (JPN) 2014	Radlada (JPN); 2006	Symboli Kris S	Tee Kay
Sire Rey de Oro (JPN) 2014	Radlada (JPN); 2006	Lady Blonde	Seeking the Gold
Sire Rey de Oro (JPN) 2014	Radlada (JPN); 2006	Lady Blonde	Wind in Her Hair
Dam Admire Miyabi (JPN) 2014	Heart's Cry (JPN); 2001	Sunday Silence	Halo
Dam Admire Miyabi (JPN) 2014	Heart's Cry (JPN); 2001	Sunday Silence	Wishing Well
Dam Admire Miyabi (JPN) 2014	Heart's Cry (JPN); 2001	Irish Dance	Tony Bin
Dam Admire Miyabi (JPN) 2014	Heart's Cry (JPN); 2001	Irish Dance	Buper Dance
Dam Admire Miyabi (JPN) 2014	Lady Skipper (JPN); 2007	Kurofune	French Deputy
Dam Admire Miyabi (JPN) 2014	Lady Skipper (JPN); 2007	Kurofune	Blue Avenue
Dam Admire Miyabi (JPN) 2014	Lady Skipper (JPN); 2007	Like the Wind	Danehill
Dam Admire Miyabi (JPN) 2014	Lady Skipper (JPN); 2007	Like the Wind	Wind in Her Hair

- Admire Terra is inbred 4 × 5 to Mr. Prospector (sire side) and 4 × 4 to Wind in Her Hair (sire and dam side).
- His dam Admire Miyabi won the 2017 Queen Cup (GIII).
- His fourth dam Wind in Her Hair won the 1995 Aral-Pokal (German Group 1) and is the dam of Deep Impact and Black Tide.

== See also ==
- Thoroughbred racing in Japan
- Meguro Kinen
- Hanshin Daishoten
