= Masquerade Ball (horse) =

Japanese racehorse

Masquerade Ball マスカレードボール
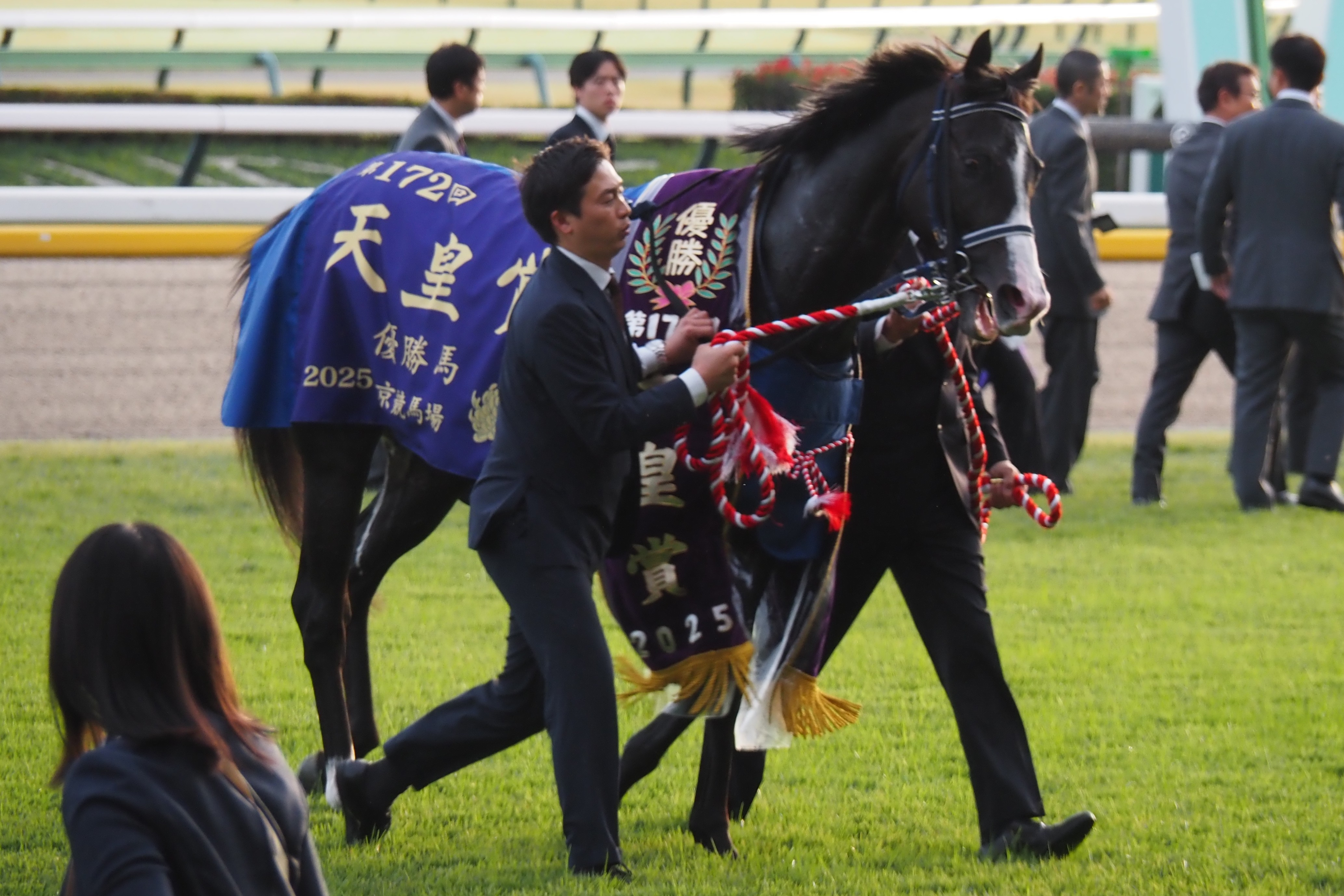
- Masquerade Ball at the 2025 Tenno Sho (Autumn).
- Sire: Duramente
- Grandsire: King Kamehameha
- Dam: Mask Off
- Damsire: Deep Impact
- Sex: Colt
- Foaled: March 2, 2022 (age 4)
- Country: Japan
- Color: Dark Bay
- Breeder: Shadai Farm
- Owner: Shadai Race Horse Co., Ltd.
- Racing colors
- Trainer: Takahisa Tezuka
- Jockey: Ryusei Sakai; Christophe Lemaire
- Record: 11: 4-3-1
- Earnings: 871,390,000 JPY (Note: Earnings earned overseas are converted to JPY using the formula provided by JRA.); JPN: 751,690,000 JPY; HK: 6,300,000 HKD

Major wins
- Kyodo Tsushin Hai (2025); Tenno Sho (Autumn) (2025)

Masquerade Ball (Japanese: マスカレードボール, Hepburn: Masukarēdo Bōru; foaled March 2, 2022) is an active Japanese Thoroughbred racehorse best known for winning the 2025 Tennō Shō (Autumn).

He was named after Masquerade ball, a kind of formal ball where participants attend in costume wearing masks.

== Racing career ==
=== 2024: two-year-old season ===
On August 11, Masquerade Ball made his debut in the fifth race at Niigata Racecourse, a newcomer race for two-year-old horses over 1,600 meters on turf, with Keita Tosaki booked as his jockey. Breaking decently out of the gates, he settled in fourth from the rear and followed the field. Entering the straight he was brought to the outside, and when he accelerated from the 400-meter mark, he swept past the pack to win the race.

For his next start, the Ivy Stakes on October 19 was chosen. In this race he ceded favor in the betting to Piko Chan Black, a horse by Kitasan Black who had produced a dominant performance in his debut race, winning by seven lengths over the runner-up, and to Silver Rain, whose dam is Normcore, and he had to be content with being the third favorite. Immediately after the start he failed to settle and tracked the pace in third position near the front. Entering the straight he went up the inside, and after passing Silver Rain, he won the duel with Piko Chan Black with a margin of a length and a half, making it two consecutive victories.

His next race would be his first graded stakes race and grade one challenge, headed to the Hopeful Stakes on December 28. He started as the fourth favorite, behind Croix du Nord, winner of the Tokyo Sports Hai Nisai Stakes, Magic Sands, winner of the Sapporo Nisai Stakes, and Pico Chan Black, with whom he had fought hard in his previous start. During the race he was positioned toward the rear of the pack. He moved forward at the third corner, and although he made headway around the fourth corner, in the straight he lacked the finishing kick and was well defeated, finishing 11th.

=== 2025: three-year-old season ===
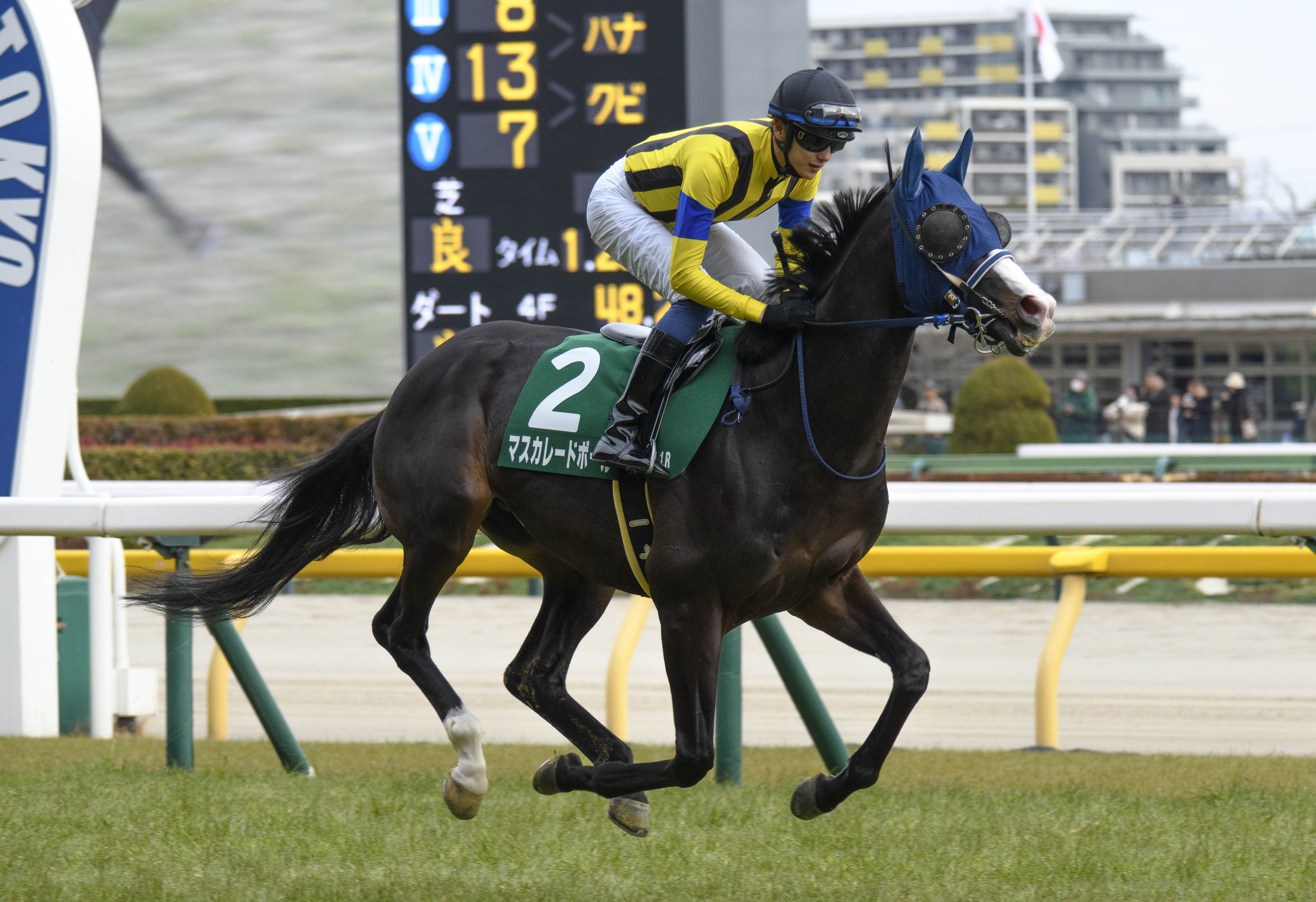
2025 Kyodo Tsushin Hai

Masquerade Ball's three-year-old season began with the Kyodo Tsushin Hai. With Ryusei Sakai booked as his jockey, he went off as the favorite to win the race, but included in the field were such notable horses as Red Kingly, who had fought a duel with Croix du Nord and Satono Shining in its previous race, and Satono Carnaval, winner of the Hakodate Nisai Stakes. During the race he sat in third position, tracking the leading group. Entering the stretch, at the 400-meter mark he suddenly displayed a powerful turn of foot, and after taking the lead, he won the battle against Kalamatianos, who was closing up from the inside, capturing his first graded stakes victory. He was declared to run in the Satsuki Shō on April 20. On the day of the race, he was placed in mid-division early and launched a fierce late charge before the finish, but fell a neck short finishing third behind Croix du Nord and the eventual winner, Museum Mile.

His next race would be the Tōkyō Yūshun (Japanese Derby), held on June 1 at Tokyo Racecourse. Starting as the fourth favorite to win the race, he tracked the race in mid-division, biding time. In the final stretch, he deployed his late kick from the middle of the track, but fell three-quarters of a length short of Croix du Nord, finishing on second place.

After the summer break, Masquerade Ball's autumn campaign began with the Tenno Sho (Autumn), held on November 2. Shadai Thoroughbred Club announced on its website that he would head to the race with Christophe Lemaire as his jockey. He started the race as the most favored horse to win. Coming out of a slowly run pace, he moved out early in the stretch to contest the front running Meisho Tabaru, overtaking him and the rest of the pack while holding off the fast finishing Museum Mile to win the race at a pace of 32.3 seconds for the last 600 meters, breaking the record of the fastest finishing time for a grade one race in Japan. He became the sixth horse in history to win the race as a three-year-old.

He moved on to race in the Japan Cup, held on November 30, against a star studded field of multiple grade one winners including Calandagan, the Cartier Horse of the Year who was fresh from winning the Champion Stakes, Croix du Nord, the Japanese Derby winner who was coming off from a heartbreaking loss at the Prix de l'Arc de Triomphe, Danon Decile, last year's Japanese Derby winner and recently won against Calandagan in the Dubai Sheema Classic, Tastiera, who won the 2023 Japanese Derby and the Queen Elizabeth II Cup earlier this year, Justin Palace, winner of the 2023 Tenno Sho (Spring), Durezza, winner of the 2023 Kikuka-shō, and Brede Weg, winner of the 2023 Queen Elizabeth II Cup in Japan. Starting the race as the top favorite, he settled near the back of the pack along with Calandagan and Danon Decile. As the race progressed on a very fast pace, he sat patiently until the final straight. Peeling off from the pack as soon as the group entered the final stretch, he unleashed his devastating late kick. Moving upfront and away from the pack, he was challenged by Calandagan with 300 meters left but was unable to hold the lead in his final strides, finishing at second place by a head. The resulting race finished with the time of 2:20.3, breaking the track record set by Almond Eye in the same race back in 2018.

=== 2026: four-year-old season ===
For his four-year-old season, Masquerade Ball was scheduled to run in either the Dubai Sheema Classic or the Osaka Hai. As Tetsuya Yoshida, president of Shadai Race Horse Co. Ltd., said on January 27, "If we go to Dubai, it would be for the Sheema Classic, and if we stay in Japan, then the G1 Osaka Hai. After that, we're also looking at the G1 King George VI and Queen Elizabeth Stakes as one of the options."

But due to unstable political situation in the Middle East region, participation in the Dubai Sheema Classic was canceled, and it was decided to compete in the Osaka Hai.

However, on March 12, due to irregularity in his gait in the left hind leg which was discovered on 6th he was sent to the Shadai Farm Yamamoto in Miyagi Prefecture for rest, resulting in his withdrawal from the Osaka Hai as well.

On the 11th, Shadai Race Horse Co. Ltd. announced that he had been pre-nominated to run in the Queen Elizabeth II Cup, which was held in Sha Tin, Hong Kong on April 26. Regarding Masquerade Ball’s recovery from the gait abnormality, his trainer, Takahisa Tezuka, said, "So far, everything is fine. Fortunately, his recovery was quick, and his movement is good. We'll continue working with him on the woodchip track over the next couple of weeks and have him fully prepared before departure."

About his preparations for the race, Takahisa Tezuka, who was pleased with his progress, said, "He's improving with each piece of work and is really coming together. We've trained him on the woodchip track for three straight weeks, and he's reached a good level of fitness. He's become a bit more robust, less about suppleness now and more about strength."

When he appeared in Sha Tin, he was slightly irritated, and in solo training showed times slower than usual. About that, Takahisa Tezuka said, "Perhaps due to the Hong Kong heat, he looked a bit irritated, so I instructed the rider to go slightly slower than planned." He added, "Visually, it may not have looked that impressive, but he hasn't done much solo work before, so without a partner, he might not have been fully engaged. He's a horse that is fundamentally well put together, so there are no issues internally."

On April 26, Masquerade Ball ran in the Queen Elizabeth II Cup. He got off to a poor start, but on the home stretch he moved up from last place and began to pick up speed rapidly, closing the gap on the leader. However, he didn't manage to close in time and finished second, losing to famous Romantic Warrior by a margin of 0.16 seconds. Christophe Lemaire, who was jockeying Masquerade Ball commented, “It was a close one. The pace wasn’t that strong, but he showed a great turn of foot in the last 200 to 300 metres. I think he’ll keep improving going forward.”

His next race would be the King George VI and Queen Elizabeth Stakes, which would happen to be his highly anticipated rematch with Calandagan after their close finish in the previous year's Japan Cup. With the same jockey, Lemaire, he continued his overseas campaign, now competing in Britain. On July 25, he ran in the race. He got off to a slow start and had to place himself in the rear, but was never able to close on the leaders in the straight and finished seventh, while Calandagan ended up losing to Kalpana, reversing the first-second finishing order with her in the same race from the previous year. Looking back at the race, trainer of Masquerade Ball commented, "It was his first experience of this kind of race, and he became a little too keen. It looked like he might rally again at the entrance to the straight, but he emptied out late," while Lemaire said, "He raced too keenly down the hill, which is unusual for him, and that left him with little at the finish. He also drifted out under pressure."

In the second half of the year, the horse returned to racing at the Tenno Sho (Autumn) with a mission to defend his title here and becoming the fourth to do so since Symboli Kris S, Almond Eye and Equinox. Speaking about his latest downhill performances in two starts, Tezuka attributed that loses ton unfamiliar surroundings around the horses but none of that mattered here as he won this particular race last year. He also further noted that the horses' late finishing kick was the best in Japan as they were drawn to start the race from Gate 7. When the gates open, the horse positioned himself at the 14th position in the early phase. As they approached the final corner, Masquerade Ball struggled to find his way out from the back of the pack and was unable to unleash his deadly finisher, as he tailed out at the back and finished in 11th. After the race, Lemaire noted that they just could not get into a good position whilst Tezuka said that the horse fell behind at the start and could not make the grounds afterwards despite the horse mint condition for the day. On a slightly positive note, Tezuka added that he accepted the result and determined that the horse can give a better performance next time around.

== Racing statistics ==
Below data is based on data available on JBIS Search,, NetKeiba. and HKJC.

Date	Track	Race	Grade	Distance (Condition)	Entry	HN	GN	Odds (Favored)	Finish	Time	Margins	Jockey	Winner (Runner-up)
2024 – two-year-old season
Aug 11	Niigata	2YO Debut		1,600 m (Firm)	13	7		1.6 (1)	1st	1:35.8	-0.1	Keita Tosaki	(Meiner Ticket)
Oct 19	Tokyo	Ivy Stakes	L	1,800 m (Firm)	8	6		4.9 (3)	1st	1:45.8	-0.2	Keita Tosaki	(Piko Chan Black)
Dec 28	Nakayama	Hopeful Stakes	GI	2,000 m (Firm)	18	18		9.9 (4)	11th	2:01.7	1.2	Keita Tosaki	Croix du Nord
2025 – three-year-old season
Feb 16	Tokyo	Kyodo Tsushin Hai	GIII	1,800 m (Firm)	9	2		3.8 (1)	1st	1:46.0	-0.1	Ryusei Sakai	(Kalamatianos)
Apr 20	Nakayama	Satsuki Shō	GI	2,000 m (Firm)	18	6		13.7 (4)	3rd	1:57.3	0.3	Takeshi Yokoyama	Museum Mile
Jun 1	Tokyo	Tōkyō Yūshun	GI	2,400 m (Firm)	18	17		6.8 (3)	2nd	2:23.8	0.1	Ryusei Sakai	Croix du Nord
Nov 2	Tokyo	Tennō Shō (Autumn)	GI	2,000 m (Firm)	14	7		2.7 (1)	1st	1:58.6	-0.1	Christophe Lemaire	(Museum Mile)
Nov 30	Tokyo	Japan Cup	GI	2,400 m (Firm)	18	15		2.5 (1)	2nd	2:20.3	0.0	Christophe Lemaire	Calandagan
2026 – four-year-old season
Apr 26	Sha Tin	Queen Elizabeth II Cup	GI	2,000 m (Good to Firm)	8	1	6	5.6 (2)	2nd	2:00.8	0.2	Christophe Lemaire	Romantic Warrior
Jul 25	Ascot	KGVI & QE Stakes	GI	1m 3f 211 yards (Note: Approximately 2406m) (Good to Firm)	9	4		13/2 (3)	7th	2:30.11	2.4	Christophe Lemaire	Kalpana
Nov 1	Tokyo	Tennō Shō (Autumn)	GI	2,000 m (Firm)	17	7		2.5 (2)	11th	1:57.8	1.2	Christophe Lemaire	Danon Decile

Legend:
Turf

== Pedigree ==
Pedigree of Masquerade Ball (JPN), Dark Bay colt, 2022
Sire Duramente b. 2012	King Kamehameha b. 2001	Kingmambo (USA)	Mr. Prospector
Sire Duramente b. 2012	King Kamehameha b. 2001	Kingmambo (USA)	Miesque
Sire Duramente b. 2012	King Kamehameha b. 2001	Manfath (IRE)	Last Tycoon
Sire Duramente b. 2012	King Kamehameha b. 2001	Manfath (IRE)	Pilot Bird (GB)
Sire Duramente b. 2012	Admire Groove b. 2000	Sunday Silence (USA)	Halo
Sire Duramente b. 2012	Admire Groove b. 2000	Sunday Silence (USA)	Wishing Well
Sire Duramente b. 2012	Admire Groove b. 2000	Air Groove	Tony Bin (IRE)
Sire Duramente b. 2012	Admire Groove b. 2000	Air Groove	Dyna Carle
Dam Mask Off br. 2009	Deep Impact b. 2002	Sunday Silence (USA)	Halo
Dam Mask Off br. 2009	Deep Impact b. 2002	Sunday Silence (USA)	Wishing Well
Dam Mask Off br. 2009	Deep Impact b. 2002	Wind in Her Hair (IRE)	Alzao (USA)
Dam Mask Off br. 2009	Deep Impact b. 2002	Wind in Her Hair (IRE)	Burghclere (GB)
Dam Mask Off br. 2009	Behind the Mask b. 1996	White Muzzle (GB)	Dancing Brave (USA)
Dam Mask Off br. 2009	Behind the Mask b. 1996	White Muzzle (GB)	Fair of the Furze (IRE)
Dam Mask Off br. 2009	Behind the Mask b. 1996	Vain Gold (USA)	Mr. Prospector
Dam Mask Off br. 2009	Behind the Mask b. 1996	Vain Gold (USA)	Chancy Dance (Family: 4-r)

- His half-sister, Masked Diva (by Rulership), won the 2023 Rose Stakes and the 2024 Hanshin Himba Stakes
- His grandmother from his damline, Behind the Mask, won the 2000 Centaur Stakes, the 2001 Swan Stakes, and the 2002 Kyoto Himba Stakes
- His cousin, Sunrise Soar, won the 2018 Heian Stakes and Nagoya Daishoten
- His dam's cousin, Koiuta, won the 2007 Victoria Mile
