= Meisho Tabaru =

Japanese Thoroughbred racehorse

Meisho Tabaru メイショウタバル
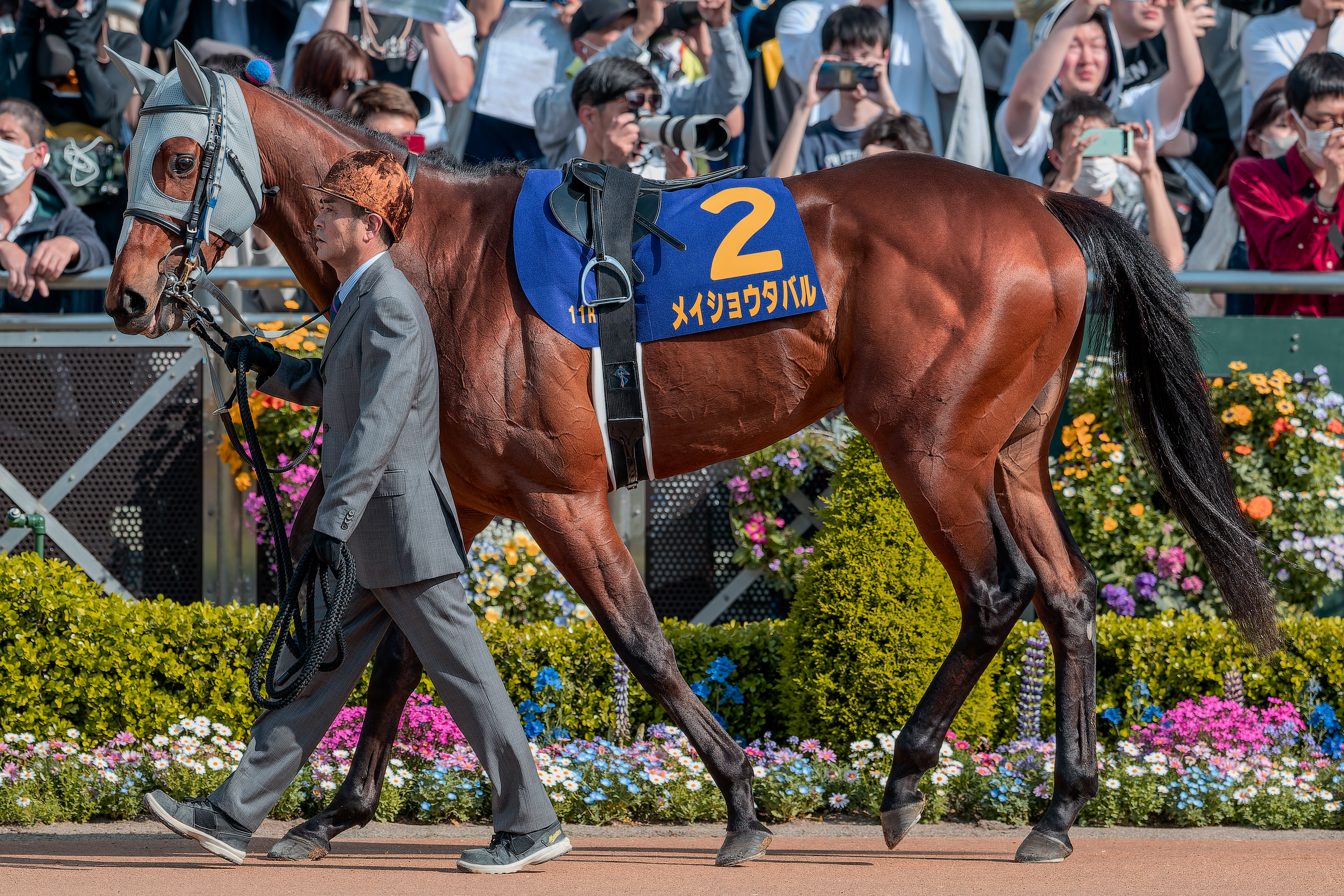
- Meisho Tabaru at the 2024 Satsuki Shō
- Breed: Thoroughbred
- Sire: Gold Ship
- Grandsire: Stay Gold
- Dam: Meisho Tsubakuro
- Damsire: French Deputy
- Sex: Stallion
- Foaled: April 20, 2021 (age 5); Urakawa, Hokkaido
- Country: Japan
- Color: Bay
- Breeder: Mishima Bokujo
- Owner: Yoshio Matsumoto ->Yoshitaka Matsumoto
- Racing colors
- Trainer: Mamoru Ishibashi
- Jockey: Yutaka Take
- Record: 18: 6-1-0
- Earnings: 866,338,600 JPY; 842,785,000 JPY (Japan); 150,000 USD (UAE)

Major wins
- Mainichi Hai (2024); Kobe Shimbun Hai (2024); Takarazuka Kinen (2025, 2026)

Meisho Tabaru (Japanese: メイショウタバル Hepburn: Meisho Tabaru; foaled April 20, 2021) is a Japanese thoroughbred racehorse who won the 2025 and 2026 Takarazuka Kinen.

== Background ==
The horse's name is derived from the Tabaruzaka district in Kumamoto, as well as the Meisho eponym (kanmei, 冠名) of the owner, Yoshio Matsumoto.

== Racing career ==
=== 2023: two-year old season ===
Meisho Tabaru ran his first race at Kyoto Racecourse, a 2,000-meter maiden race for two-year-olds; ridden by Taiga Tsunoda, he finished fourth. His second maiden race saw him finish fifth behind future rival Danon Decile; his third, at Hanshin Racecourse, saw him claim his first win.

=== 2024: three-year old season ===
Meisho Tabaru was to start the season with the Wakagoma Stakes on January 20, but was scratched at the last moment due to a lameness in the right forearm. He was instead sent to the Tsubaki Sho on February 17, where he scored his second victory after taking the lead early on and holding onto it for the rest of the race. He was initially planned to run the Spring Stakes after that, but instead entered the Mainichi Hai on March 23 after having to briefly recuperate from a phlegmon on his left forearm. In the Mainichi Hai, Meisho Tabaru led from start to finish to claim his first graded win by 6 lengths. Following this victory, it was announced that the horse's next race would be the Satsuki Shō.

At the Satsuki Shō, Meisho Tabaru set a blistering front-running pace, covering the first 1,000 meters in 57.5 seconds. While this led to the winner, Justin Milano, breaking the race record, Meisho Tabaru burnt through his stamina and lost momentum on the final stretch, finishing last. He was next entered into the Tōkyō Yūshun, but was scratched on May 24 after it was discovered that he had suffered a stone bruise on his left hind leg.

After taking the summer off, Meisho Tabaru was entered into the Kobe Shimbun Hai, held on September 22. After making a good start and taking the lead, he held on to beat June Take by half a length despite the latter's efforts to catch up.

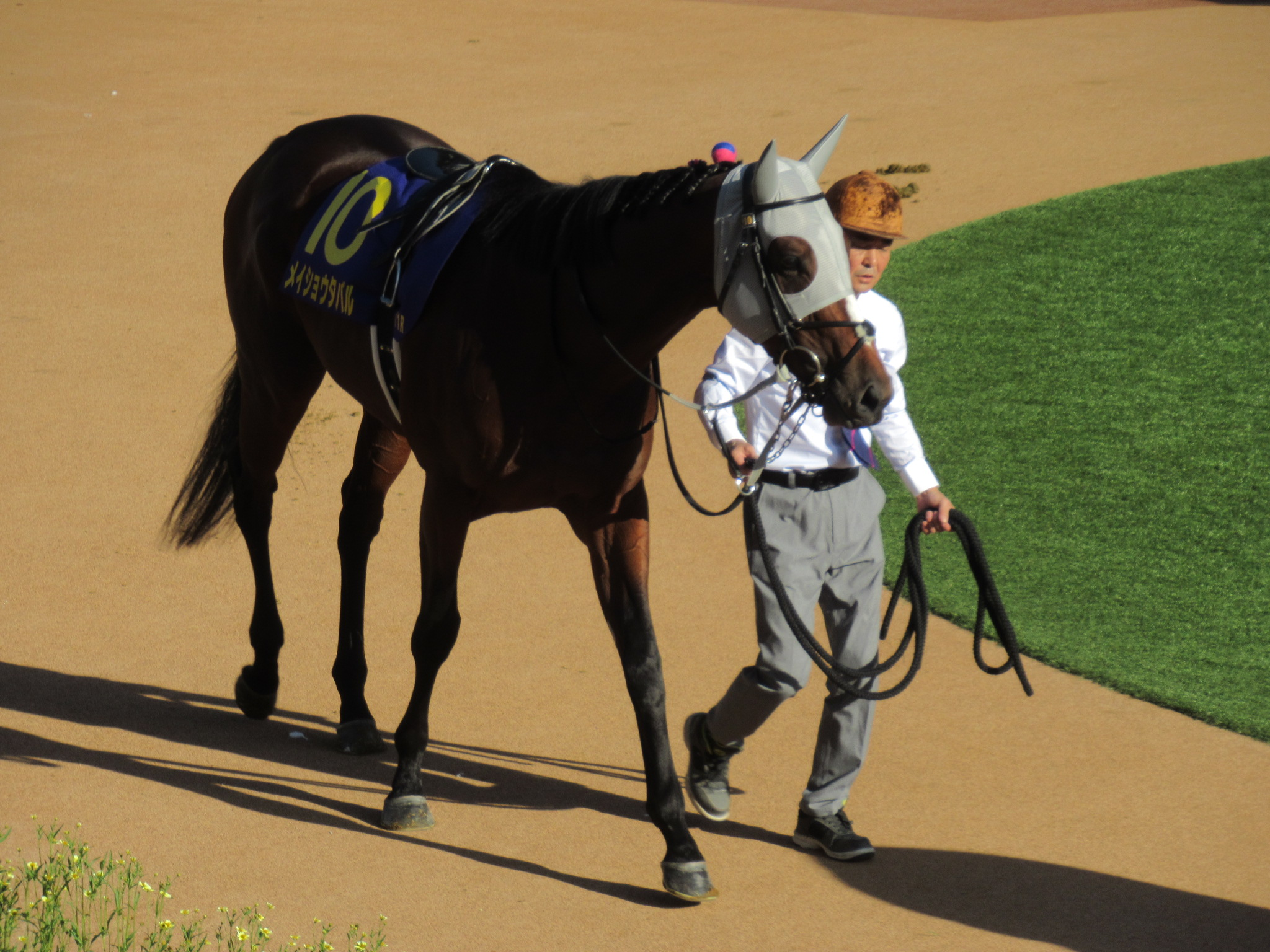
Meisho Tabaru at the Kikuka Sho

On October 20, Meisho Tabaru ran in the Kikuka-shō, where he briefly took the lead at the first corner of the second lap, but as the leader of the pack kept changing rapidly the horse lost the will to continue racing, dropping back and finishing 16th, over 5 seconds behind the winner, Urban Chic.

In spite of this defeat, it was announced that the horse was planned to race the Arima Kinen. However, as the race drew near, the number of horses registered to run in it exceeded the maximum, and Meisho Tabaru's inferior prize money left him unable to enter.

=== 2025: four-year old season ===
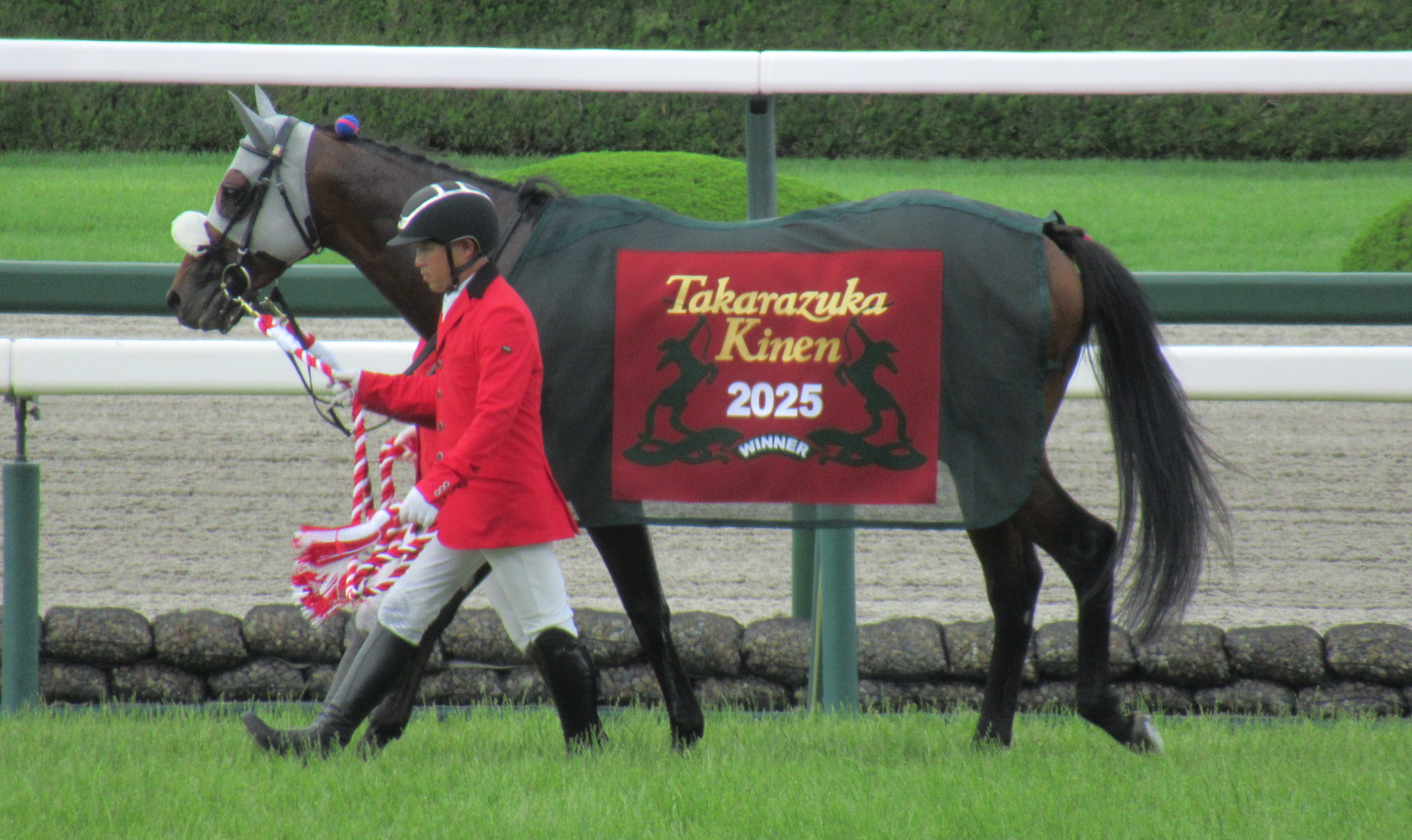
Meisho Tabaru after winning the Takarazuka Kinen

Following his Arima Kinen withdrawal, Meisho Tabaru was instead entered into the Nikkei Shinshun Hai. After taking the lead early on, he sped up and covered the first 1,000 meters in 57.7 seconds. However, much like at the Satsuki Shō, he then lost momentum and fell back on the final straight to finish 11th, 2.1 seconds behind the winner Lord del Rey. Following the race, the horse was sent to pasture to recuperate.

His next race would be the Dubai Turf on April 5, with Yutaka Take as his new jockey. In that race, he overcame a poor start to lead until the final stretch, where he was overtaken by Romantic Warrior and ultimately finished fifth.

On June 15, after returning to Japan, the horse was entered into the Takarazuka Kinen, with Take once again as his jockey. After taking the lead at the start, Meisho Tabaru ran the first 1,000 meters in 59.1 seconds. Fending off a challenge from Bellagio Opera on the final corner, Meisho Tabaru would go on to win the race by three lengths. This marked a father-son victory for the horse, as his sire, Gold Ship, won the same race in 2013 and 2014. This also marked Yutaka Take's fifth victory in the race, the most by any jockey, and his first since Deep Impact in 2006; the first win for a front-runner in the race since Eishin Deputy in 2008; and the first Grade I victory for trainer Mamoru Ishibashi.

After another rest period, Meisho Tabaru was entered into the Autumn Tenno Sho on November 2, where he once again led for most of the race only to run out of stamina and finish sixth. His final race of the year was the Arima Kinen, where he overtook Mystery Way at the beginning of the backstretch, but again burned out in the final stretch and finished thirteenth, 1.1 seconds behind winner Museum Mile.

=== 2026: five-year-old season ===
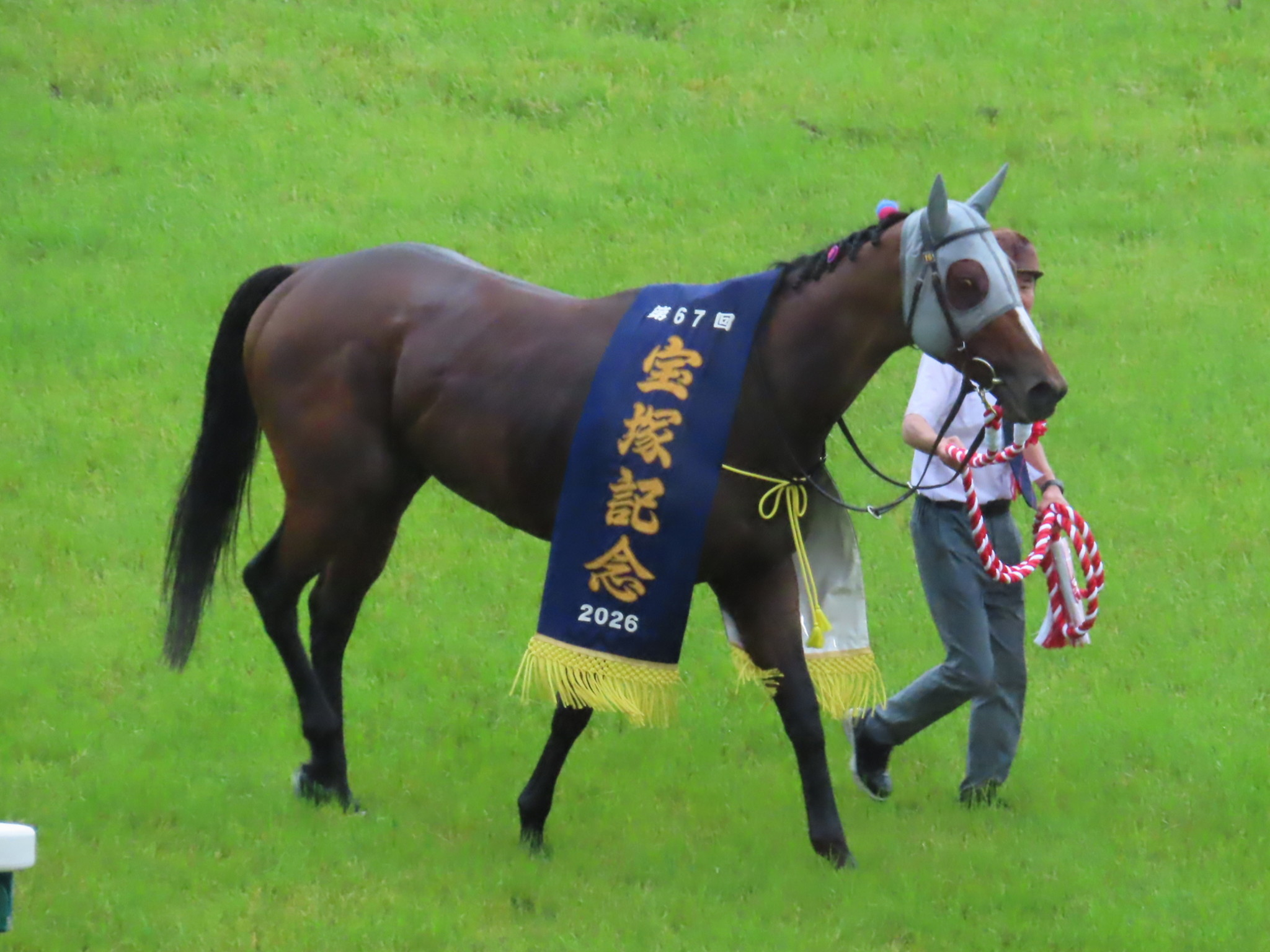
Meisho Tabaru after winning the 2026 Takarazuka Kinen

Meisho Tabaru began 2026 with an attempt at the Osaka Hai at Hanshin Racecourse, where he had never previously lost. His trainer Ishibashi said that the horse was lighter and not being pushed so much in training, while jockey Take admitted that the Arima Kinen run had been botched due to the tough race flow and stated that the Osaka Hai's 2000-metre distance was more suitable for him. At the start, he overcame a late start to take the lead as expected, pulling more than three lengths clear in the backstretch. He held on to that lead until the final 100 metres when Croix du Nord surged from the back and overtook him, winning by three-quarters of a length. Despite losing the race, Take stated he was proud of his ride that day because Meisho Tabaru gave it his all, and credited him for not stopping until the very end.

After the Osaka Hai, Meisho Tabaru's connection announced that they intended to have him run in the Prix de l'Arc de Triomphe in France, and on May 21 he was one of seven JRA horses, including Forever Young, Shin Emperor, and Juryoku Pierrot, that were registered to enter.

In his second entry to the Takarazuka Kinen, he would face the winners of his two previous races, Croix du Nord and Museum Mile, as well as top mare Regaleira, who had finished ahead of him in the 2025 Arima Kinen. Croix du Nord entered the race as the favorite: having won the first two legs of the Spring Triple Crown, the Osaka Hai and Tenno Sho (Spring), he was aiming to become the first Spring Triple Crown winner in JRA history. Meisho Tabaru would start as second favorite, and indeed ran second throughout the race, before overtaking Cosmo Kuranda on the stretch, and then holding off Croix du Nord's final charge, to take a second Takarazuka Kinen win. This matched his sire's record of back-to-back Takarazuka Kinen victories, with Chrono Genesis being the only other two-time winner. Take remarked after the race about how similar the final stretch, with Croix du Nord giving chance, had felt to the Osaka Hai.

After winning back-to-back Takarazuka Kinen, for the next race it was decided to take on the Prix de l'Arc de Triomphe. On the July 23 it was confirmed by the owner that he will go straight to the event without a preparatory race. On the September 8 he left Japan through Narita International Airport.

On October 4 he started out as the second favorite in the 13th slot. After the race started he went on to take a bold lead and set up a slow pace, while Bay City Roller had settled a length behind him. Leading through much of the race, at last 400 meter however he started to lose ground and Bay City Roller had seized the lead. With just 100 meters to go, the favorite Daryz, last year's Arc winner, from the outside had surged decisively and rapidly caught up with Bay City Roller and then flew away to finish length and 1/4 ahead in first, making it only eight time in history when a horse won it back-to-back. It marked the first time in 48 years that a male horse had achieved this feat. Meanwhile, Meisho Tabaru managed to finish only 14th, making it the same with his sire, Gold Ship, who also finished 14th in the Arc after winning back-to-back Takarazuka Kinen in 2014.

== Racing form ==
The following racing form is based on information available on JBIS-Search, netkeiba.com, Racing Post, and the Emirates Racing Authority.

Date	Track	Race	Grade	Distance (Condition)	Entry	HN	Odds (Favored)	Finish	Time	Margins	Jockey	Winner (Runner-up)
2023 – two-year-old season
Oct 9	Kyoto	2yo Newcomer		2,000 m (Soft)	10	5	5.3 (3rd)	4th	2:05.9	0.4	Taiga Tsunoda	Allnatt
Oct 28	Kyoto	2yo Maiden Race		1,800 m (Firm)	10	6	3.9 (2nd)	5th	1:48.3	0.4	Taiga Tsunoda	Danon Decile
Dec 24	Hanshin	2yo Maiden Race		2,000 m (Firm)	14	7	3.3 (1st)	1st	2:00.6	-0.2	Suguru Hamanaka	(Culminale)
2024 – three-year-old season
Jan 14	Kyoto	Wakagoma Stakes	L	2,000 m (Soft)	7	4	Scratched				Suguru Hamanaka	Sunrise Zipangu
Feb 17	Kyoto	Tsubaki Sho	ALW (1 win)	1,800 m (Firm)	9	5	6.1 (3rd)	1st	1:46.9	0.0	Suguru Hamanaka	(Keep Calm)
Mar 23	Hanshin	Mainichi Hai	GIII	1,800 m (Soft)	10	4	9.4 (5th)	1st	1:46.0	-1.0	Ryusei Sakai	(Noble Roger)
Apr 14	Nakayama	Satsuki Sho	GI	2,000 m (Firm)	17	2	7.0 (4th)	17th	1:59.3	2.2	Suguru Hamanaka	Justin Milano
May 26	Tokyo	Tokyo Yushun	GI	2,400 m (Firm)	17	16	Scratched				Suguru Hamanaka	Danon Decile
Sept 22	Chukyo	Kobe Shimbun Hai	GII	2,200 m (Good)	14	15	5.4 (2nd)	1st	2:11.8	-0.1	Suguru Hamanaka	(June Take)
Oct 20	Kyoto	Kikuka-shō	GI	3,000 m (Firm)	18	10	9.6 (5th)	16th	3:09.3	5.2	Suguru Hamanaka	Urban Chic
2025 – four-year-old season
Jan 19	Chukyo	Nikkei Shinshun Hai	GII	2,200 m (Firm)	16	6	5.3 (2nd)	11th	2:11.9	2.1	Suguru Hamanaka	Lord del Rey
Apr 5	Meydan	Dubai Turf	GI	1,800 m (Firm)	11	6	19.0 (5th)	5th	1:46.27	0.43	Yutaka Take	Soul Rush
June 15	Hanshin	Takarazuka Kinen	GI	2,200 m (Good)	17	12	11.4 (7th)	1st	2:11.1	-0.5	Yutaka Take	(Bellagio Opera)
Nov 2	Tokyo	Tenno Sho (Fall)	GI	2,000 m (Firm)	14	13	8.6 (5th)	6th	1:58.8	0.2	Yutaka Take	Masquerade Ball
Dec 28	Nakayama	Arima Kinen	GI	2,500 m (Firm)	16	6	5.8 (4th)	13th	2:32.6	1.1	Yutaka Take	Museum Mile
2026 – five-year-old season
Apr 5	Hanshin	Osaka Hai	GI	2,000 m (Firm)	15	6	4.8 (3rd)	2nd	1:57.7	0.1	Yutaka Take	Croix du Nord
Jun 14	Hanshin	Takarazuka Kinen	GI	2,200 m (Soft)	17	16	3.9 (2nd)	1st	2:12.1	-0.1	Yutaka Take	(Croix du Nord)
Oct 4	Longchamp	Prix de l'Arc de Triomphe	GI	2,400 m (Good to Soft)	16	5	33/1 (11th)	14th	2:28.1	1.0	Yutaka Take	Daryz

Legend:

Turf

== Pedigree ==
Pedigree of Meisho Tabaru
Sire Gold Ship gr. 2009	Stay Gold dk.b. 1994	Sunday Silence	Halo
Sire Gold Ship gr. 2009	Stay Gold dk.b. 1994	Sunday Silence	Wishing Well
Sire Gold Ship gr. 2009	Stay Gold dk.b. 1994	Golden Sash	Dictus
Sire Gold Ship gr. 2009	Stay Gold dk.b. 1994	Golden Sash	Dyna Sash
Sire Gold Ship gr. 2009	Point Flag gr. 1998	Mejiro McQueen	Mejiro Titan
Sire Gold Ship gr. 2009	Point Flag gr. 1998	Mejiro McQueen	Mejiro Aurola
Sire Gold Ship gr. 2009	Point Flag gr. 1998	Pastoralism	Pluralisme
Sire Gold Ship gr. 2009	Point Flag gr. 1998	Pastoralism	Tokuno Eighty
Dam Meisho Tsubakuro b. 2010	French Deputy ch. 1992	Deputy Minister	Vice Regent
Dam Meisho Tsubakuro b. 2010	French Deputy ch. 1992	Deputy Minister	Mint Copy
Dam Meisho Tsubakuro b. 2010	French Deputy ch. 1992	Mitterand	Hold Your Peace
Dam Meisho Tsubakuro b. 2010	French Deputy ch. 1992	Mitterand	Laredo Lass
Dam Meisho Tsubakuro b. 2010	Dancing Happiness dk. b. 1999	Dance in the Dark	Sunday Silence
Dam Meisho Tsubakuro b. 2010	Dancing Happiness dk. b. 1999	Dance in the Dark	Dancing Key
Dam Meisho Tsubakuro b. 2010	Dancing Happiness dk. b. 1999	Meisho Sachikaze	Crystal Glitters
Dam Meisho Tsubakuro b. 2010	Dancing Happiness dk. b. 1999	Meisho Sachikaze	Seattle Dancer

- Meisho Tabaru is inbred 3 x 4 to Sunday Silence, meaning that this stallion appears in both the third and fourth generations of his pedigree.
- Meisho Tabaru's uncle is Meisho Kanpaku, the winner of the 2012 Kyōto Daishōten.
- Meisho Tabaru's dam, Meisho Tsubakuro, is the horse that Mamoru Ishibashi won his last win as a jockey.
