= Danon Decile =

Japanese racehorse

Danon Decile ダノンデサイル
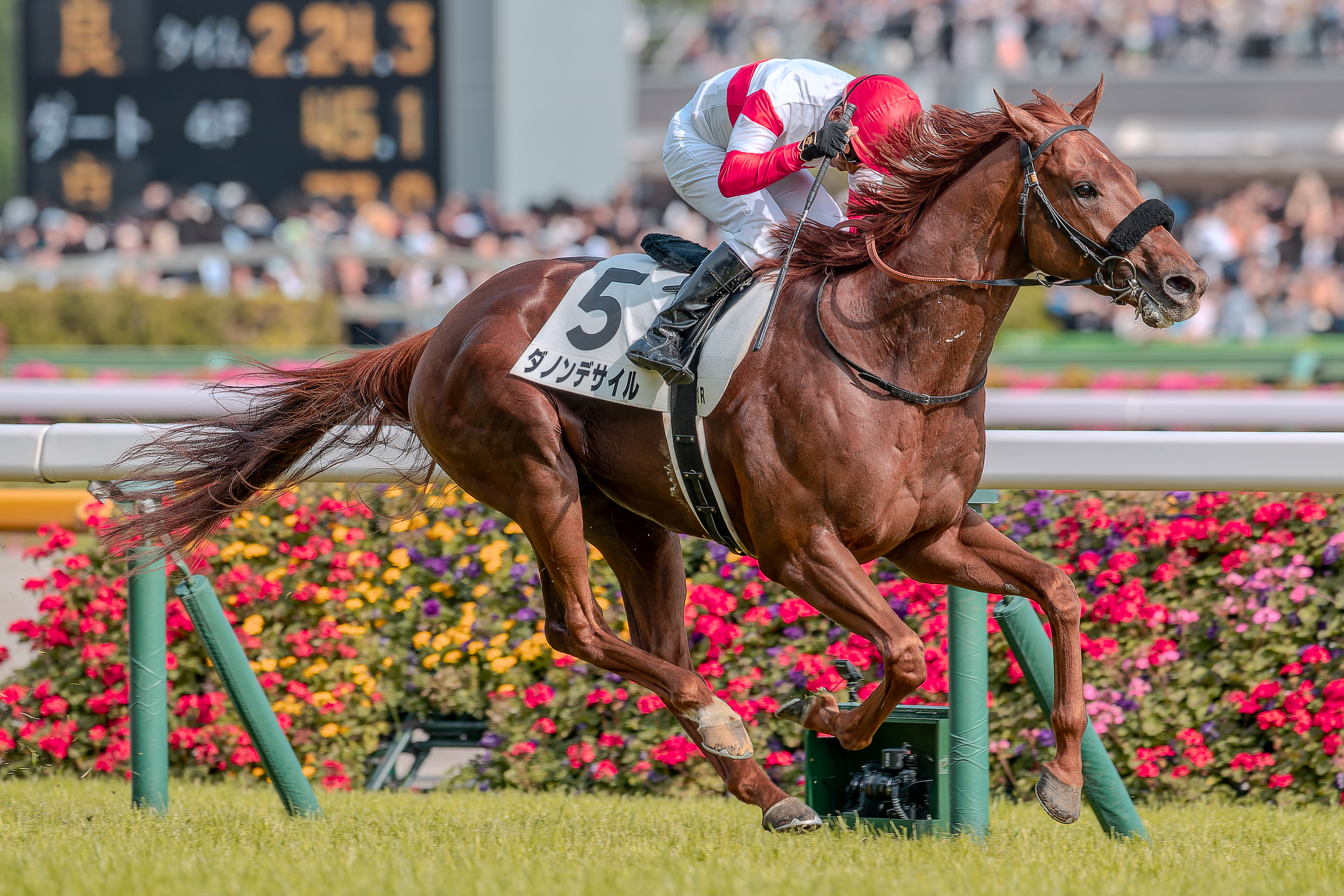
- Danon Decile winning the 91st Tokyo Yushun (May 26, 2024)
- Breed: Thoroughbred
- Sire: Epiphaneia
- Grandsire: Symboli Kris S
- Dam: Top Decile
- Damsire: Congrats
- Sex: Colt
- Foaled: April 6, 2021 (age 5)
- Color: Chestnut
- Breeder: Shadai Farm
- Owner: Danox Co Ltd
- Racing colors
- Trainer: Shogo Yasuda
- Jockey: Norihiro Yokoyama; Keita Tosaki
- Record: 16: 6-0-5
- Earnings: 1,844,444,400 JPY (Note: Earnings earned overseas are converted to JPY using the formula provided by JRA.); JPN: 1,291,384,000 JPY; UAE: 3,480,000 USD

Major wins
- Keisei Hai (2024); American Jockey Club Cup (2025); Dubai Sheema Classic (2025); Tenno Sho (Autumn) (2026); Japanese Classic Race wins: Tokyo Yushun (2024)

Awards
- JRA Award for Best Three-Year-Old Colt (2024)

Danon Decile (Japanese: ダノンデサイル, Hepburn: Danon Desairu; foaled April 6, 2021) is a Japanese thoroughbred racehorse who won the 2024 Japanese Derby, the 2025 Dubai Sheema Classic and the 2026 Tenno Sho (Autumn). He won the JRA Award for Best Three-Year-Old Colt in 2024.

== Background ==
Danon Decile was foaled at Shadai Farm in Chitose, Hokkaido on April 6, 2021. He was bought by Danox, the asset management company of Mitsuhiro Noda, at the 2022 JRHA Select Sale Yearling Session for 135 million yen.

Danon Decile was later put in the stable of Shogo Yasuda at Ritto Training Center.

== Racing career ==
=== 2023: two year old season ===
Danon Decile debuted at a newcomer race for 2-year olds held at Tokyo Racecourse over a course of 1600m on October 9, where he came in fourth behind Fabulous Star. The horse won his first race at a maiden race on October 28 held at Kyoto Racecourse over a course of 1800m. Danon Decile finished the season off in November 25's Kyoto Nisai Stakes, his first graded race, where he placed in the rear of the pack throughout the race before catching up to take the lead, only to finish fourth behind Shin Emperor.

=== 2024: three year old season ===
Danon Decile started the season off with the Keisei Hai, held on January 14 at Nakayama Racecourse, where he ran 5th for most of the way before taking the lead on the final stretch. Urban Chic attempted to catch up to the horse, but Danon Decile managed to stave him off with a 3/4 length lead; securing his first graded victory and for his jockey, Norihiro Yokoyama, the title of the oldest JRA jockey to win a graded race, aged 55 years, 10 months and 23 days at the time. The horse also received some additional attention as reviews of the race footage revealed the horse had defecated during the race.

The horse was later entered in to the Satsuki Sho on April 14, but was scratched at the last minute after showing signs of lameness on his right foreleg.

On May 26, at the 91st Tokyo Yushun (Japanese Derby), the horse was placed in the front of the pack, where he was able to take the lead from Justin Milano on the stretch. This marked Yokoyama's 3rd Derby win, and the oldest JRA jockey to win any graded JRA race at the age of 56 years 3 months and 4 days, surpassing Yutaka Take's previous record of 54 years 9 months and 10 days. Meanwhile, his trainer, Shogo Yasuda, won his first GI race with this race, and also became the youngest trainer to win the Japanese Derby at 41 years 10 months and 19 days old.

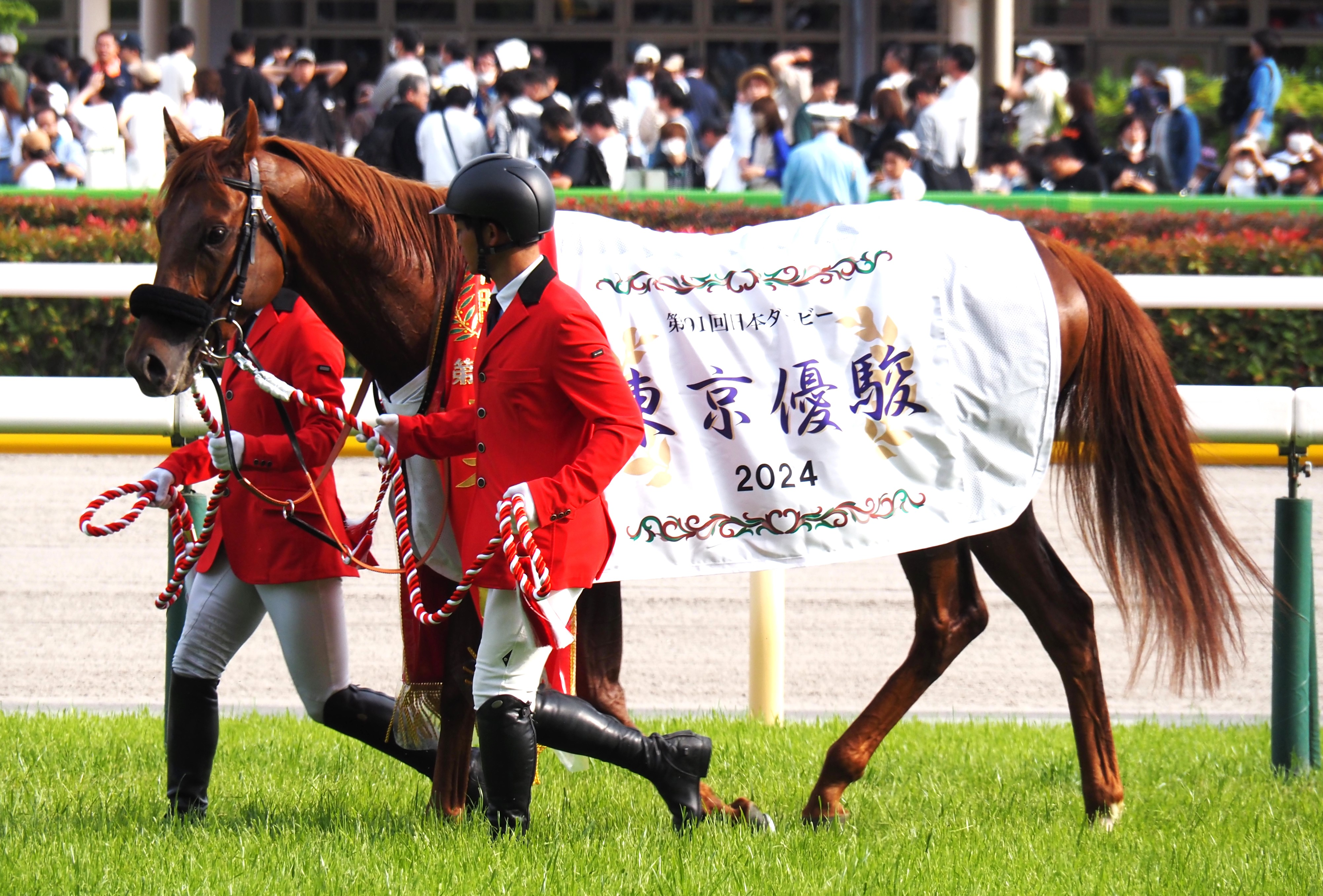
After winning the Tokyo Yushun

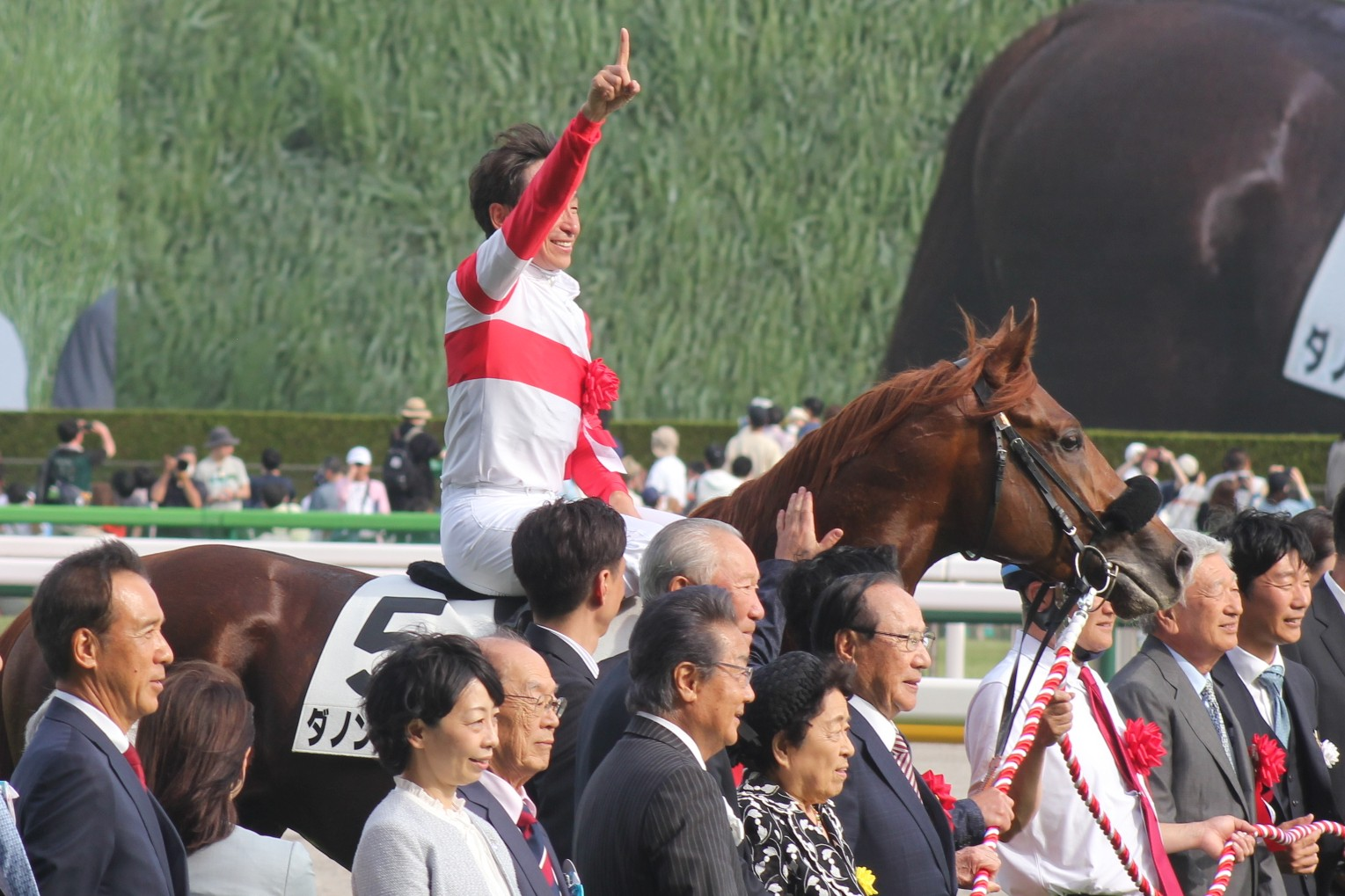
Tokyo Yushun Award Ceremony

On October 20, Danon Decile started as the top favorite in the Kikuka-shō (Japanese St. Leger). Despite initially racing near the front early in the race, his position gradually deteriorated due to a challenging inner gate draw, forcing him to navigate traffic in the final stretch. He finished sixth after a late surge from the outside. In the Arima Kinen, he set a slow pace, covering the first 1,000 meters in 62.9 seconds. He briefly led in the homestretch but was overtaken by Regaleira and Shahryar, settling for third place.

=== 2025: four year old season ===
Newly partnered with jockey Keita Tosaki, Danon Decile secured his first victory of the year in the American Jockey Club Cup at Nakayama Racecourse on January 26, justifying his status as the race favorite. This win marked the first time in 26 years, since Special Week (Danon Decile's paternal grandsire) in 1999, that a Japanese Derby horse had won the American Jockey Club Cup, making him the fourth horse to achieve this feat.

On April 5, Danon Decile and Tosaki contested the Dubai Sheema Classic. Racing mid-pack early, he unleashed a bold late charge to overtake the leaders and held off a fierce challenge from Calandagan to secure his first overseas Group 1 victory. This triumph also made him the first overseas Group 1 winner sired by Epiphaneia.

On August 20, Danon Decile finished 5th out of 6 horses in the International Stakes. When he returned to Japan, he was set up for his next target, the Japan Cup on November 30. In the race, he stayed mainly at eleventh position. After the furlong pole, he started to accelerate at a good rate but just a bit late compare to both Calandagan and Masquerade Ball, ended up finished in third. With the Arima Kinen coming up, Tosaki had to make a decision to ride him or Regaleira, the reigning champion and he chose the former. When the race started, Danon Decile broke smoothly from gate nine and traveled wide in ninth. He improved his position while sweeping wide around the final corners and produced an impressive burst of speed down the lane but was overtaken by the fast-closing Museum Mile in the last 50 meters and finished a neck behind Cosmo Kuranda in third.

=== 2026: five-year-old season ===
The initial plan for the early season was to defend his title at the Dubai Sheema Classic when the team accepted the invitation in March. This plan did not materialize due to ongoing tension at the Middle East region concurrently. Yasuda said the decision to withdraw from the race was made after discussions with the owners. Danon Decile headed for the Osaka Hai instead with new jockey, Ryusei Sakai because Tosaki was suspended. On the race day, Danon Decile would start from the gate 4 which is leaning to the inside track whilst the most favourite of the race, Croix du Nord got the outermost gate, gate 15. When the race began, Danon Decile settled himself in front of Croix du Nord at sixth position in the middle pack. Turning into the lane, he briefly met traffic but eventually found space for clear running for the lead. He got through it too late as he failed to track the late-surging Croix du Nord nor overtake the front-running Meisho Tabaru, finishing a length behind in third. Next, he would started at the Takarazuka Kinen in June. Tosaki who returned as his jockey this time, held the pace and was unhurried around 14th position and made headway on the rails rounding the final corners before angling out at the top of the stretch. Then, he dug well to close in on the leaders with the fastest late speed, and while unable to threaten the top two finishers due to too much ground to make up, he denied tenacious Cosmo Kuranda just before the wire to register his fourth consecutive third-place finish since last year's Japan Cup.

Danon Decile returned to racing in November at the Tenno Sho (Autumn). One week before the race, his main jockey, Tosaki, said his racing rhythm was intact during the workout, a view Yasuda agreed with, who was confident the horse would finish better than third this time. In this race, he was drawn to start from the outermost gate, Gate 17, which led to the dismay of the masses, but Yasuda composedly answered that the team just had to deal with it. Breaking smoothly from the farthest stall, Danon Decile settled into second from the rear before launching a breakthrough run on the outside as they approached the final bend. Entering the final straight, he blitzed down the stretch with amazing speed, taking command over his rivals rallying for the lead at the furlong pole and held off a late challenge by the oncoming Nebra Disk on the inside to win by two and a half lengths on the line. Tosaki said after the race that the draw did made them to switch a few things around but the core of his performance always being his stable rhythm and that was the key to their performance on the day. Additionally, he added that, "The pace was good, and he was travelling comfortably, so I had a feeling he would explode in the stretch. I'm delighted that we were able to show his strength. Once again, he's a 'Very, Very Horse." A veteran jockey, Katsumi Ando said that his riding for this day was not particularly well but noted that the horse was responding to his consistent riding, further proving that Danon Decile's racing rhythm was incredible. This was the first time since Symboli Kris S in 2002 that the race winner started from the outermost gate and the 16th career G1 win for Tosaki.

Danon Decile surging in the homestretch at the 2026 Tenno Sho (Autumn)

Danon Decile at the winning ceremony of 2026 Tenno Sho Autumn with his jockey, Keita Tosaki held his saddlecloth for a photo session.

== Racing statistics ==
Below data is based on data available on JBIS Search, NetKeiba, and Emirates Racing Authority.

Date	Track	Race	Grade	Distance (Condition)	Entry	HN	Odds (Favored)	Finish	Time	Margins	Jockey	Winner (Runner-up)
2023 – two-year-old season
Oct 9	Tokyo	2yo Newcomer		1,600 m (Good)	13	2	8.3 (3rd)	4th	1:37.7	0.8	Norihiro Yokoyama	Fabulous Star
Oct 28	Kyoto	2yo Maiden Race		1,800 m (Firm)	10	6	11.3 (5th)	1st	1:47.9	-0.1	Norihiro Yokoyama	(Silvery Moon)
Nov 25	Kyoto	Kyoto Nisai Stakes	G3	2,000 m (Firm)	14	4	43.0 (11th)	4th	1:59.9	0.1	Norihiro Yokoyama	Shin Emperor
2024 – three-year-old season
Jan 14	Nakayama	Keisei Hai	G3	2,000 m (Firm)	14	14	11.5 (5th)	1st	2:00.5	-0.1	Norihiro Yokoyama	(Urban Chic)
Apr 14	Nakayama	Satsuki Sho	G1	2,000 m (Firm)	17	16	Scratched				Norihiro Yokoyama	Justin Milano
May 26	Tokyo	Tokyo Yushun	G1	2,400 m (Firm)	17	5	46.6 (9th)	1st	2:24.1	-0.4	Norihiro Yokoyama	(Justin Milano)
Oct 20	Kyoto	Kikuka-shō	G1	3,000 m (Firm)	18	4	2.9 (1st)	6th	3:04.8	0.7	Norihiro Yokoyama	Urban Chic
Dec 22	Nakayama	Arima Kinen	G1	2,500 m (Firm)	15	1	4.0 (2nd)	3rd	2:32.0	0.2	Norihiro Yokoyama	Regaleira
2025 – four-year-old season
Jan 26	Nakayama	American Jockey Club Cup	G2	2,200 m (Firm)	18	8	2.6 (1st)	1st	2:12.1	-0.1	Keita Tosaki	(Matenro Leo)
Apr 5	Meydan	Dubai Sheema Classic	G1	2,410 m (Good)	9	6	11.0 (5th)	1st	2:27.05	-0.19	Keita Tosaki	(Calandagan)
Aug 20	York	International Stakes	G1	2,063 m (Firm)	6	2	3.5 (3rd)	5th	2:09.59	1.69	Keita Tosaki	Ombudsman
Nov 30	Tokyo	Japan Cup	G1	2,400 m (Firm)	18	14	5.0 (3rd)	3rd	2:20.8	0.5	Keita Tosaki	Calandagan
Dec 28	Nakayama	Arima Kinen	G1	2,500 m (Firm)	16	9	3.8 (2nd)	3rd	2:31.6	0.1	Keita Tosaki	Museum Mile
2026 – five-year-old season
Apr 5	Hanshin	Osaka Hai	G1	2,000 m (Firm)	15	4	3.9 (2nd)	3rd	1:57:9	0.3	Ryusei Sakai	Croix du Nord
Jun 14	Hanshin	Takarazuka Kinen	G1	2,200 m (Soft)	18	1	7.0 (3rd)	3rd	2:12:6	0.5	Keita Tosaki	Meisho Tabaru
Nov 1	Tokyo	Tenno Sho (Autumn)	G1	2,000 m (Firm)	17	17	10.8 (4th)	1st	1:56.7	-0.4	Keita Tosaki	(Nebra Disk)

Legend:
Turf

== Pedigree ==
Pedigree of Danon Decile
Sire Epiphaneia b. 2010	Symboli Kris S (USA) dk. b. 1999	Kris S.	Roberto
Sire Epiphaneia b. 2010	Symboli Kris S (USA) dk. b. 1999	Kris S.	Sharp Queen
Sire Epiphaneia b. 2010	Symboli Kris S (USA) dk. b. 1999	Tee Key	Gold Meridian
Sire Epiphaneia b. 2010	Symboli Kris S (USA) dk. b. 1999	Tee Key	Tri Argo
Sire Epiphaneia b. 2010	Cesario blk. 2002	Special Week	Sunday Silence (USA)
Sire Epiphaneia b. 2010	Cesario blk. 2002	Special Week	Campaign Girl
Sire Epiphaneia b. 2010	Cesario blk. 2002	Kirov Premiere (GB)	Sadler's Wells (USA)
Sire Epiphaneia b. 2010	Cesario blk. 2002	Kirov Premiere (GB)	Querida (IRE)
Dam Top Decile ch. 2012	Congrats b. 2000	A.P. Indy	Seattle Slew
Dam Top Decile ch. 2012	Congrats b. 2000	A.P. Indy	Weekend Surprise
Dam Top Decile ch. 2012	Congrats b. 2000	Praise	Mr. Prospector
Dam Top Decile ch. 2012	Congrats b. 2000	Praise	Wild Applause
Dam Top Decile ch. 2012	Sequoia Queen dk. b. 2004	Forestry	Storm Cat
Dam Top Decile ch. 2012	Sequoia Queen dk. b. 2004	Forestry	Shared Insterest
Dam Top Decile ch. 2012	Sequoia Queen dk. b. 2004	Barefoot Dyna	Dynaformer
Dam Top Decile ch. 2012	Sequoia Queen dk. b. 2004	Barefoot Dyna	Spankey's Seconds
