= Croix du Nord =

Japanese-bred Thoroughbred racehorse

Croix du Nord クロワデュノール
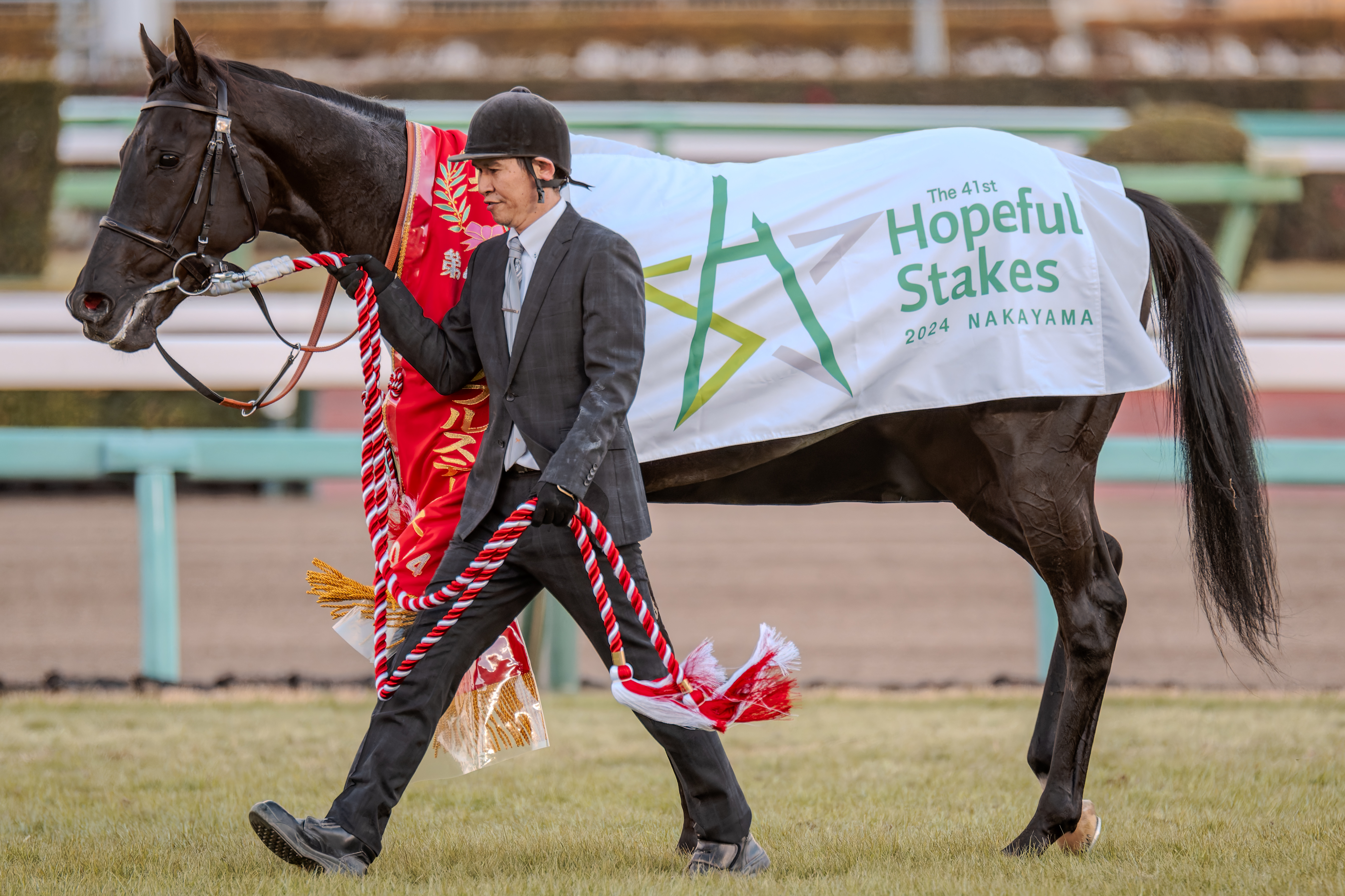
- Croix du Nord after winning the 2024 Hopeful Stakes
- Breed: Thoroughbred
- Sire: Kitasan Black
- Grandsire: Black Tide
- Dam: Rising Cross
- Damsire: Cape Cross
- Sex: Colt
- Foaled: March 21, 2022 (age 4)
- Country: Japan
- Color: Brown
- Breeder: Northern Farm
- Owner: Sunday Racing
- Racing colors
- Trainer: Takashi Saito
- Jockey: Yuichi Kitamura
- Record: 12: 7-2-0
- Earnings: 1,370,920,600 JPY (Note: Earnings earned overseas are converted to JPY using the formula provided by JRA.); JPN: 1,364,950,000 JPY; FRA: 36,600 EUR

Major wins
- Tokyo Sports Hai Nisai Stakes (2024); Hopeful Stakes (2024); Prix du Prince d'Orange (2025); Osaka Hai (2026); Tennō Shō (Spring) (2026); Japanese Classic Race wins: Tōkyō Yūshun (2025)

Awards
- JRA Award for Best Two-Year-Old Colt (2024)
- Last updated on November 1, 2026

Croix du Nord (Japanese: クロワデュノール, Hepburn: Kurowa Dyu Nōru; foaled March 21, 2022) is an active Japanese Thoroughbred racehorse best known for winning the 2024 Hopeful Stakes and the 2025 Tōkyō Yūshun. He won the JRA Award for Best Two-Year-Old Colt in 2024.

== Background ==
His dam, Rising Cross, a British racehorse foaled in 2003, was bred from the mare Woodrising and the stallion Cape Cross. As a yearling, she was purchased for €20,000 by agent David Minton and entered into the ownership of Dave Nevison (Heading for the Rocks Partnership), being sent into training with John Best. Known for her petite stature, measuring just 14.3 hands, more akin to a pony, she showed promise on the track. In her three-year-old season (2006), she finished second to Alexandrova in the Epsom Oaks, after which ownership transferred to Gary Tanaka. That year, Rising Cross placed third in the Irish Oaks and went on to win the Park Hill Stakes. Her female lineage was noted for strong performances over middle to long distances. In 2008, Rising Cross was imported to Japan. One of her notable Japanese-bred offspring was Earthrise, sired by Manhattan Cafe, foaled in 2012; Earthrise finished second in the 2015 Flower Cup, and placed in both the 2016 Aichi Hai and the 2017 Mermaid Stakes. In 2022, Rising Cross foaled Croix du Nord, sired by Kitasan Black. His name means "northern cross" in French.

Croix du Nord was in the fourth crop of Kitasan Black, before the impact of Kitasan Black's most famous offspring, Equinox, became apparent. By 2021, Kitasan Black’s stud fee had fallen to a career-low of ¥3,000,000, yet the number of registered foals increased by sixteen from the previous generation, totaling seventy.

== Racing career ==
=== 2024: two-year-old season ===
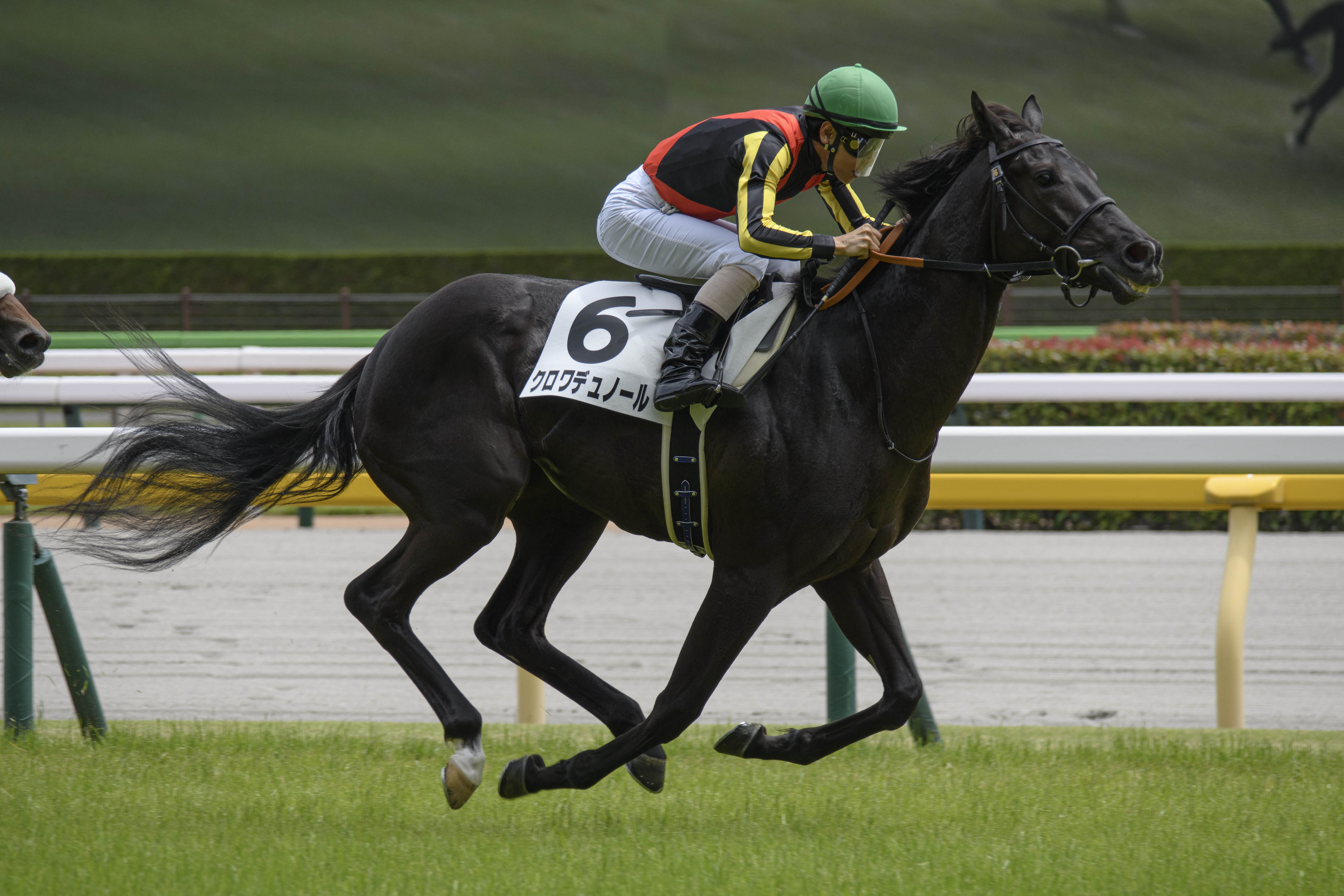
Croix du Nord in his debut race

On June 9, 2024, Croix du Nord made his debut in a two-year-old maiden race over 1800 meters on turf at Tokyo Racecourse, ridden by Yuichi Kitamura. Although he appeared somewhat immature in the paddock, he broke well at the start, settled just behind the leader in second place, and then drew clear in the stretch. He fended off Cervinia's half-brother, Arlecchino, to win the race. His winning time of 1 minute 46.7 seconds set a new record for two-year-olds over 1800 meters on turf in June, and tied for the fastest debut maiden time ever recorded at that course, including three-year-olds.

His connections confirmed that he would take his next start in the Grade 2 Tokyo Sports Hai Nisai Stakes, often regarded as a stepping-stone for future stars. Held on November 16, 2024, that race drew significant attention, with him as the favorite. Red Kingly, by Saturnalia, was the second choice, followed by Satono Shining, by Kizuna. He had gained 24 kg since his debut, and his workouts leading into the race lacked their usual power; his trainer indicated he was not yet fully at peak fitness. In the race, Satono Shining set the pace with Red Kingly tracking in second and him sitting third. Rounding the final turn, he moved up to challenge for the lead. In the stretch, a fierce battle ensued among him and the two front-runners, but he prevailed to secure his first graded stakes victory.

On November 20, his connections announced plans to enter him in the Grade 1 Hopeful Stakes. On December 28, he went to post as the favorite, enjoying a high single’s win support rate of 44.2 percent. In the race, Jun Asahi Sora dictated a steady tempo in front, while the third favorite, Piko Chan Black, and second favorite, Magic Sands, pressed on the lead. He tracked in the middle of the pack along the outside. Midway down the backstretch, outsider Faust Rasen swept past the field; he followed that move to advance into third as they turned for home. Once in the straight, he unleashed a sustained closing run to overtake Faust Rasen, then held off a late charge from Giovanni (who finished second), winning by two lengths. This margin was the largest since the Hopeful Stakes was elevated to Grade 1 status in 2017. His undefeated three-race streak to close the year featured wins in which he took the initiative and ran down his rivals, an approach praised in Yushun magazine by Reiichi Yokote as demonstrating the composure and dominance of a champion. For jockey Yuichi Kitamura, this marked his first Grade 1 victory in four years since Arima Kinen aboard Chrono Genesis, then followed by a severe fall; he was moved to tears in the postrace interview in front of the grandstand.

In the 2024 JRA Awards, he was selected as Best Two-Year-Old Colt, receiving 249 of 256 votes and defeating Admire Zoom by seven votes. In the JPN Thoroughbred Rankings for two-year-olds that year, he earned an official rating of 117 pounds, awarded on the strength of his Hopeful Stakes triumph, placing him one pound ahead of Admire Zoom as the top-rated two-year-old. His 117-pound rating tied the record for highest-ever two-year-old rating, matching Danon Premium’s mark in 2017.

Thanks in large part to his contribution, Kitasan Black achieved a career-high fourth place in the JRA’s two-year-old sire standings in 2024. His progeny’s earnings in graded stakes that year amounted to ¥141,114,000, ranking him first among sires.

=== 2025: three-year-old season ===
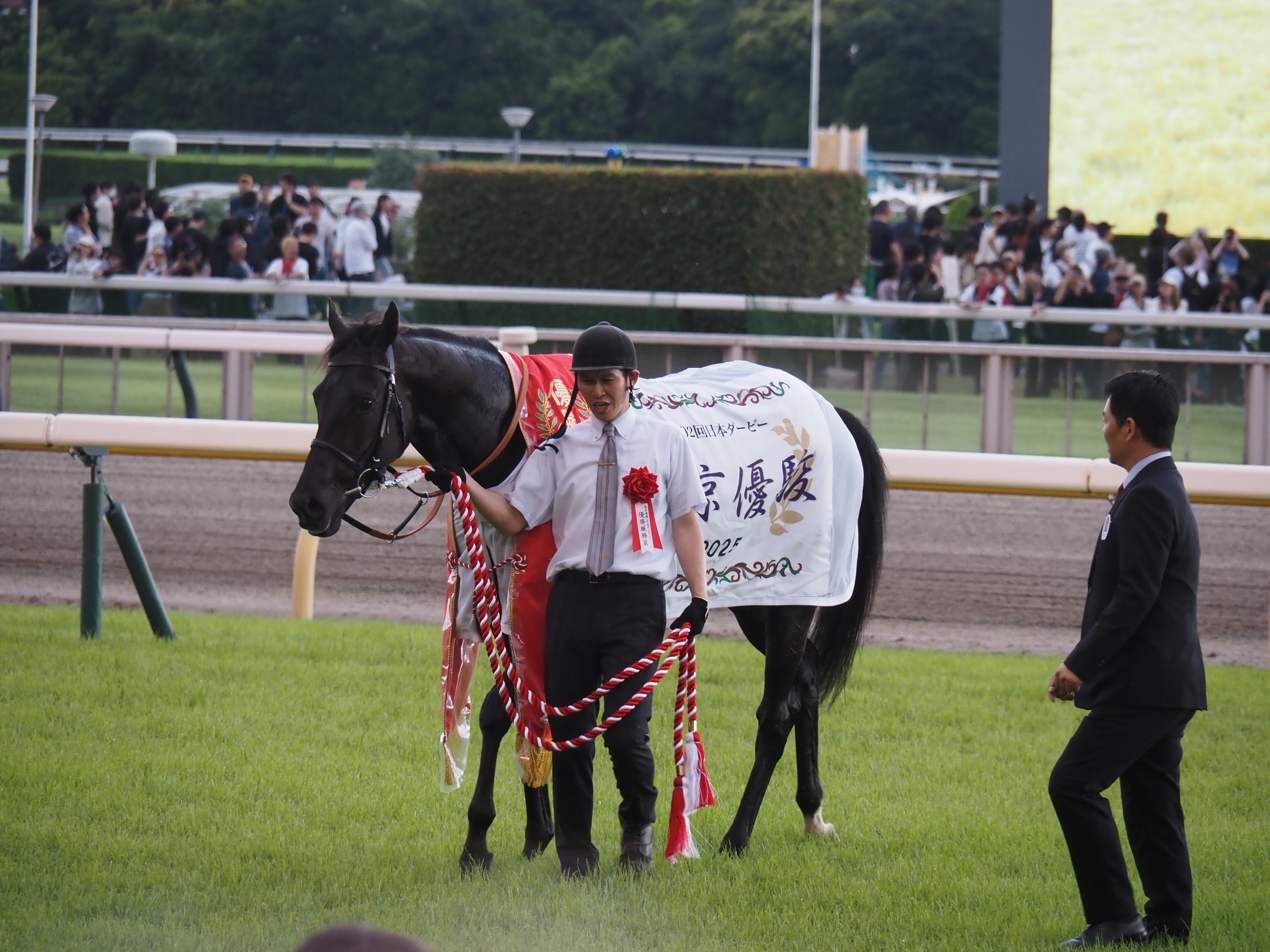
Croix du Nord after winning the Tokyo Yushun

In his three-year-old debut, the Satsuki Sho (Japanese 2000 Guineas), he raced in a prominent position. However, on the second turn, Faust Rasen and others launched forward, upending the pace; although he briefly took the lead in the stretch, he was overtaken by Museum Mile and finished second, falling short of becoming the tenth undefeated winner of the Satsuki Sho. With an eye toward the Tokyo Yushun (Japanese Derby) at Tokyo Racecourse on June 1, he was sent to spell at Northern Farm Shigaraki in Shiga Prefecture on April 23. His trainer, Saito, reflected on the Satsuki Sho: “I wonder what might have happened had things gone a bit more smoothly, but it couldn’t be helped. He didn’t seem to lose much in transit, and it was good to have given him a bit of breathing room. In the end, it’s just the result.”

On May 7, his owner, Sunday Racing, announced via its website that he had been nominated, among other options, for this autumn’s Prix de l’Arc de Triomphe, to be run on October 5. After grazing, he returned to Ritto Training Center on May 8. From there, he prepared for the Japanese Derby still with Yuichi Kitamura on board.

In the Japanese Derby on June 1 at Tokyo Racecourse, he tracked in third to fourth place during the run. In mid-stretch, he moved up to take the lead and held off a determined charge from Masquerade Ball and Shohei, winning decisively to claim his second Grade 1 title.

On September 14, he made his first overseas start in the Prix du Prince d'Orange at Longchamp Racecourse, in preparation for the Prix de l'Arc de Triomphe. After a good start, he settled in fourth place and moved smoothly. In the final straight he launched a bold run and prevailed in a tight contest, holding off a fierce late challenge from the three-year-old french-trained Daryz to take first place. Carrying 58 kg for the first time and overcoming the heavy going, he recorded his first overseas graded stakes victory. On September 19, Kitamura was suspended for the races on September 28 and 29 by the French Gallop for exceeding the permitted number of whip uses during the Prix du Prince d'Orange.

On October 5, Croix du Nord ran in the Prix de l'Arc de Triomphe. He started from the 17th bracket on the very outside of the field. He battled for the front position on the opening stretch coming out of it leading the field. He led the pack until the final straight but faded late, finishing in 14th place. Croix du Nord arrived safely back in Japan on October 9. Upon returning to his hometown, Croix du Nord would run in the Japan Cup as his eventual last race of the year. When the race began, the horse positioned himself on the front group. He tried to rally for the win at the final stretch but faded out and was overtaken by Danon Decile at the final 50 metres to finish in fourth place.

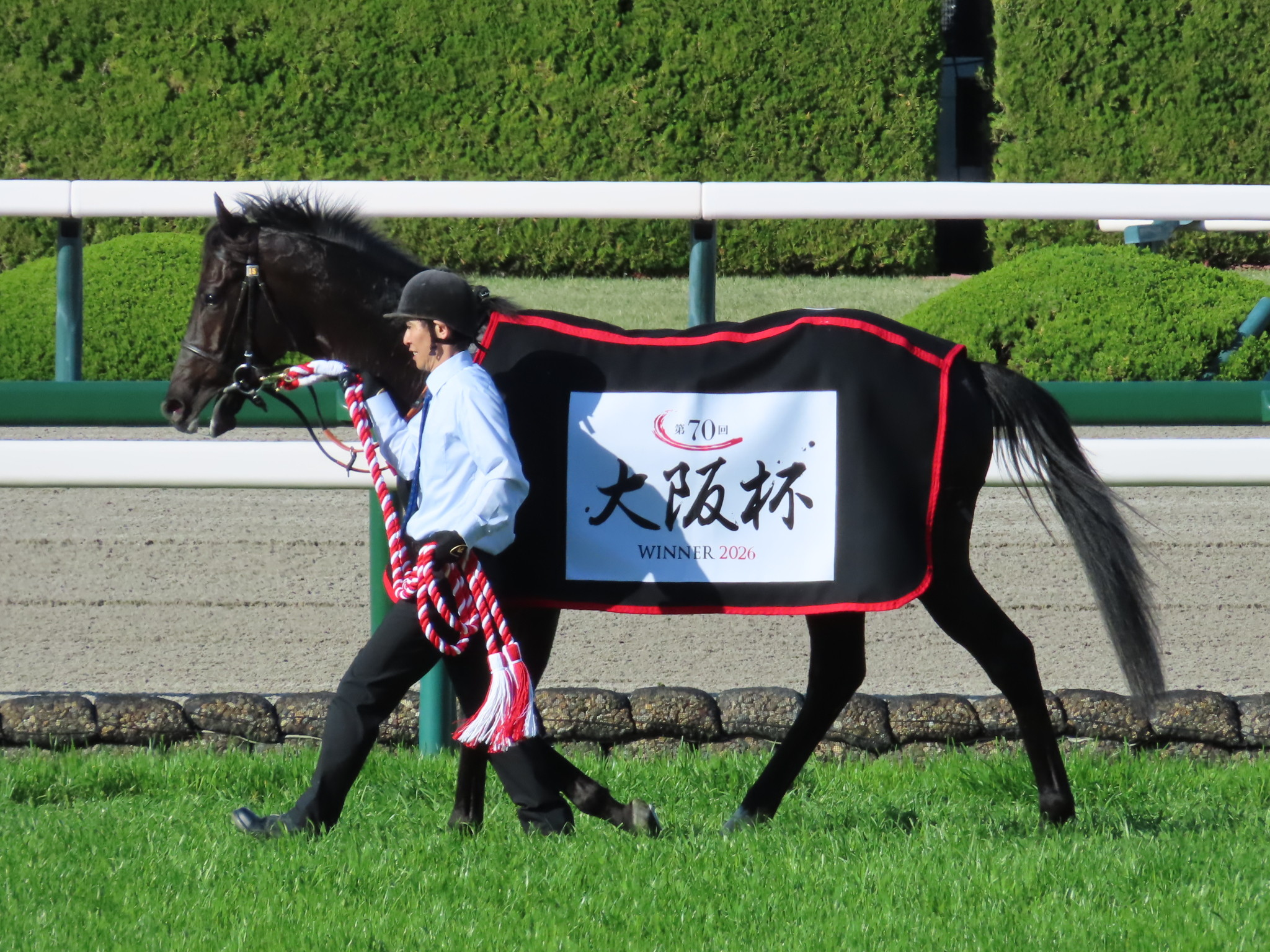
Croix du Nord at the Osaka Hai

=== 2026: four-year-old season ===
Croix du Nord started his year at the run in the Osaka Hai. He was having a good workout with his jockey Kitamura quoted, "If he runs his race, the result will follow. From here, I want to show the best of Croix du Nord again and get him back to being the favourite." From the outermost gates, Croix du Nord stayed on the midfield before surging up as the race gone by. At the final stretch, he was on the rally for the win and overtook Meisho Tabaru to win the Osaka Hai by three-quarters of a length over him. Kitamura spoke after the win and described that Croix du Nord could be the star of the year and hope they would defeat Meisho Tabaru, who excels at the Hanshin Racecourse, in which they were successful.

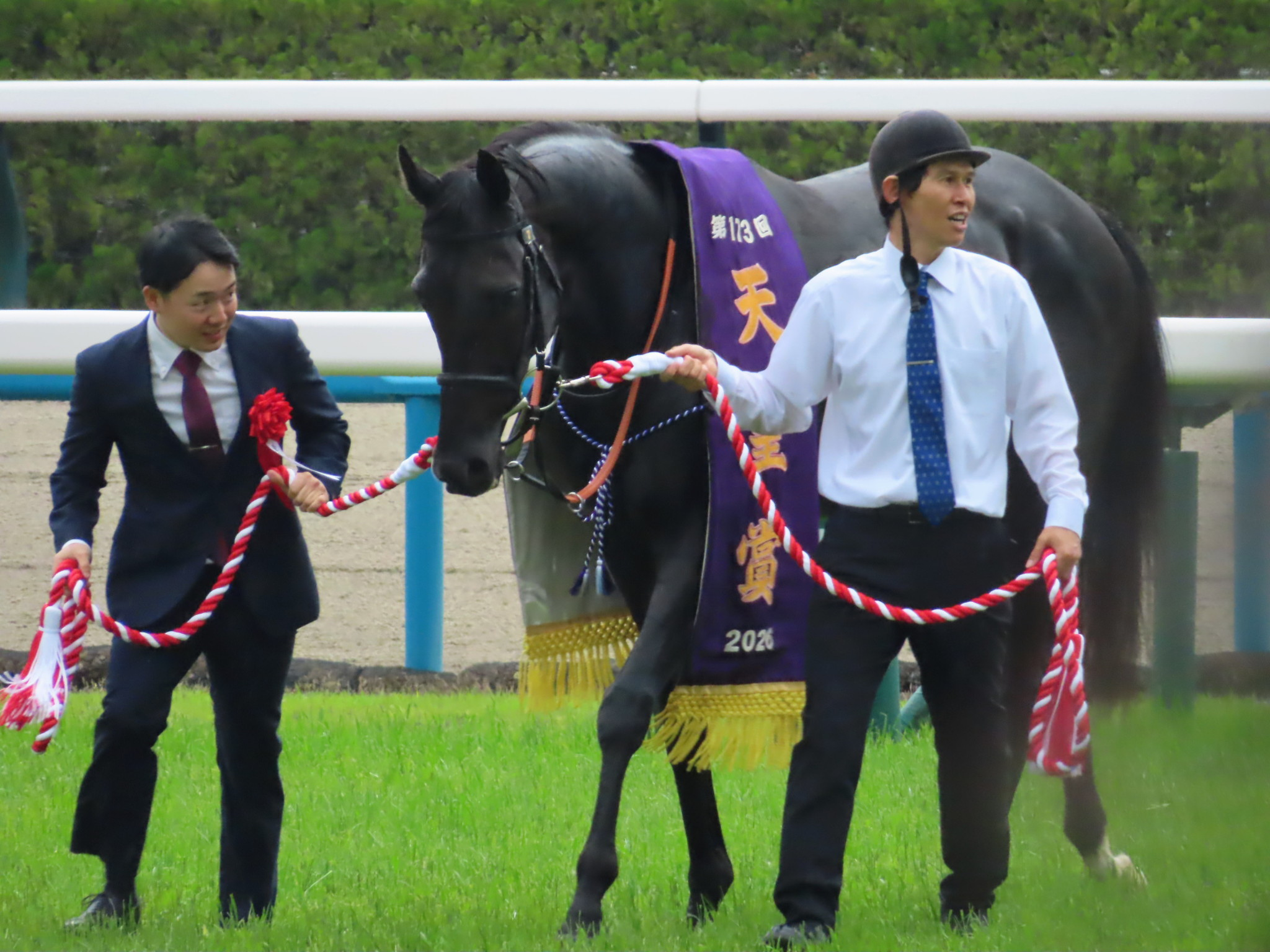
Croix du Nord after winning the 2026 Tenno Sho (Spring)

After winning the Osaka Hai, Sunday Racing announced that the horse would be entered into the Spring Tennō Shō, with Kitamura returning as his jockey. When he broke out from the gate 7, Kitamura held down the pace and settled in the middle pack throughout the first lap. Croix du Nord started picking things up heading towards the final turn and got to the lead just inside the 300-meter mark. He was seemingly able to cruise to the finish line until 12th favourite Wurttemberg suddenly burst forward with the fastest closing speed and incurred a photo finish at the line. After roughly ten minutes of deliberation from the stewards, it was decided that Croix du Nord won the race by a nose over Wurttemberg with a winning margin of roughly 2 centimeters. After the race, Kitamura commented, "At the finish, I didn't even know if we had won. The photo took a long time, but I'm really relieved we got the result. I'm very happy. My main priority early on was whether he could relax on the initial downhill, but to be honest, he was a bit keen, and it would have been better if he had relaxed more. He has good maneuverability, so I moved early and built momentum, and he really dug in well."

On May 28, the JRA announced the final results of the vote for members of 2026 Takarazuka Kinen, where Croix du Nord topped the poll with a record number of 366,039 votes from the total of 4,168,985 valid votes. The previous record was set by Do Deuce, who received 238,367 votes in 2024. The second was Meisho Tabaru with 348,698 votes. Shunsuke Yoshida said shortly before the race Sunday Racing had agreed to enter Croix du Nord into the race to target becoming the first Spring Triple Crown champion, and also that Croix du Nord would not enter the year's Prix de l'Arc de Triomphe due to Croix du Nord's difficulty with the race's track and long distance. When the gates opened, Croix du Nord tracked the pace in good striking position, around fifth from the front, and saved ground along the rails through the final two corners. Approaching the fourth corner, he launched his bid upon entering the lane, chasing Meisho Tabaru and unleashing a powerful late kick in an attempt to catch the leader as he had in the Osaka Hai but fell a neck short this time to finish second.

The horse was rested and returned to action at the Tenno Sho (Autumn), a 2000 metres race held in Tokyo in November. This time, he would be switching jockey to Cristian Demuro. His trainer, Saito, said his responses had improved in the workouts and there are no concerns about his condition and movements. For this race, he was drawn into the innermost, Gate 1. As the race favourite, the horse broke from the stall calmly and sit well in the sixth position. As the field reached the final bend and everyone got into position, the pack boxed him in from the outside, leaving him with a tight angle to take the inside line. Demuro instead switched to the outside but kept getting blocked before returning to the inside for the final furlong, as he contested both Tagano Dude and Shake Your Heart for position. He finished in fifth between those horses at the line, four and a half lengths behind the winner, Danon Decile. In the post-race, Demuro said that the horse was a bit slow in giving the needed reaction since this was his first race after the break, whilst Saito, who looked disappointed, said that he could not move like they planned and the inside draw killed their chances as it made it harder to get into the right position.

== Racing statistics ==
Below data is based on data available on JBIS Search, NetKeiba, and France Galop.

Date	Track	Race	Class	Distance (Condition)	Field	HN	Odds (Favored)	Finish	Time	Winning (Losing) Margins	Jockey	Winner (Runner-up)
2024 – two-year-old season
Jun 9	Tokyo	Two Year Old Debut		1800 m (Firm)	11	6	6.1 (3)	1st	1:46.7	2 1/2 lengths	Yuichi Kitamura	(Arlecchino)
Nov 16	Tokyo	Tokyo Sports Hai Nisai Stakes	GII	1800 m (Firm)	9	4	2.2 (1)	1st	1:46.8	3/4 length	Yuichi Kitamura	(Satono Shining)
Dec 28	Nakayama	Hopeful Stakes	GI	2000 m (Firm)	18	6	1.8 (1)	1st	2:00.5	2 lengths	Yuichi Kitamura	(Giovanni)
2025 – three-year-old season
Apr 20	Nakayama	Satsuki Sho	GI	2000 m (Firm)	18	10	1.5 (1)	2nd	1:57.3	(1 1/2 lengths)	Yuichi Kitamura	Museum Mile
Jun 1	Tokyo	Tokyo Yushun	GI	2400 m (Firm)	18	13	2.1 (1)	1st	2:23.7	3/4 length	Yuichi Kitamura	(Masquerade Ball)
Sep 14	Longchamp	Prix du Prince d'Orange	GIII	2000 m (Very Soft)	7	3	2.4 (1)	1st	2:11.69	short head	Yuichi Kitamura	(Daryz)
Oct 5	Longchamp	Prix de l'Arc de Triomphe	GI	2400 m (Very Soft)	18	15	9.7 (4)	14th	2:30.81	(11 lengths)	Yuichi Kitamura	Daryz
Nov 30	Tokyo	Japan Cup	GI	2400 m (Firm)	18	2	4.6 (2)	4th	2:20.9	(3 3/4 lengths)	Yuichi Kitamura	Calandagan
2026 – four-year-old season
Apr 5	Hanshin	Osaka Hai	GI	2000 m (Firm)	15	15	2.5 (1)	1st	1:57.6	3/4 length	Yuichi Kitamura	(Meisho Tabaru)
May 3	Kyoto	Tenno Sho (Spring)	GI	3200 m (Firm)	15	7	1.8 (1)	1st	3:13.7	nose	Yuichi Kitamura	(Wurttemberg)
Jun 14	Hanshin	Takarazuka Kinen	GI	2200 m (Soft)	18	5	2.5 (1)	2nd	2:12.1	(neck)	Yuichi Kitamura	Meisho Tabaru
Nov 1	Tokyo	Tennō Shō (Autumn)	GI	2000 m (Firm)	17	1	2.3 (1)	5th	1:57.4	(4 1/2 lengths)	Cristian Demuro	Danon Decile

Legend:
Turf

== Pedigree ==
Pedigree of Croix du Nord (JPN), brown stallion, 2022
Sire Kitasan Black b. 2012	Black Tide d.b. 2001	Sunday Silence (USA)	Halo
Sire Kitasan Black b. 2012	Black Tide d.b. 2001	Sunday Silence (USA)	Wishing Well
Sire Kitasan Black b. 2012	Black Tide d.b. 2001	Wind in Her Hair (IRE)	Alzao (USA)
Sire Kitasan Black b. 2012	Black Tide d.b. 2001	Wind in Her Hair (IRE)	Burghclere (GB)
Sire Kitasan Black b. 2012	Sugar Heart b. 2005	Sakura Bakushin O	Sakura Yutaka O
Sire Kitasan Black b. 2012	Sugar Heart b. 2005	Sakura Bakushin O	Sakura Hagoromo
Sire Kitasan Black b. 2012	Sugar Heart b. 2005	Otome Gokoro	Judge Angelucci (USA)
Sire Kitasan Black b. 2012	Sugar Heart b. 2005	Otome Gokoro	Tizly (USA)
Dam Rising Cross (GB) dk. b. 2003	Cape Cross (IRE) dk. b. 1994	Green Desert (USA)	Danzig
Dam Rising Cross (GB) dk. b. 2003	Cape Cross (IRE) dk. b. 1994	Green Desert (USA)	Foreign Courier
Dam Rising Cross (GB) dk. b. 2003	Cape Cross (IRE) dk. b. 1994	Park Appeal	Ahonoora (GB)
Dam Rising Cross (GB) dk. b. 2003	Cape Cross (IRE) dk. b. 1994	Park Appeal	Balidaress
Dam Rising Cross (GB) dk. b. 2003	Woodrising (GB) b. 1992	Nomination	Dominion
Dam Rising Cross (GB) dk. b. 2003	Woodrising (GB) b. 1992	Nomination	Rivers Maid (IRE)
Dam Rising Cross (GB) dk. b. 2003	Woodrising (GB) b. 1992	Bodham	Bustino
Dam Rising Cross (GB) dk. b. 2003	Woodrising (GB) b. 1992	Bodham	Cley (Family: 20-c)

- His dam, Rising Cross, won the 2006 Park Hill Stakes.
- His great-great-granddam's half-brother, Blakeney, won the Epsom Derby.
