= Museum Mile (horse) =

Japanese racehorse

Museum Mile ミュージアムマイル
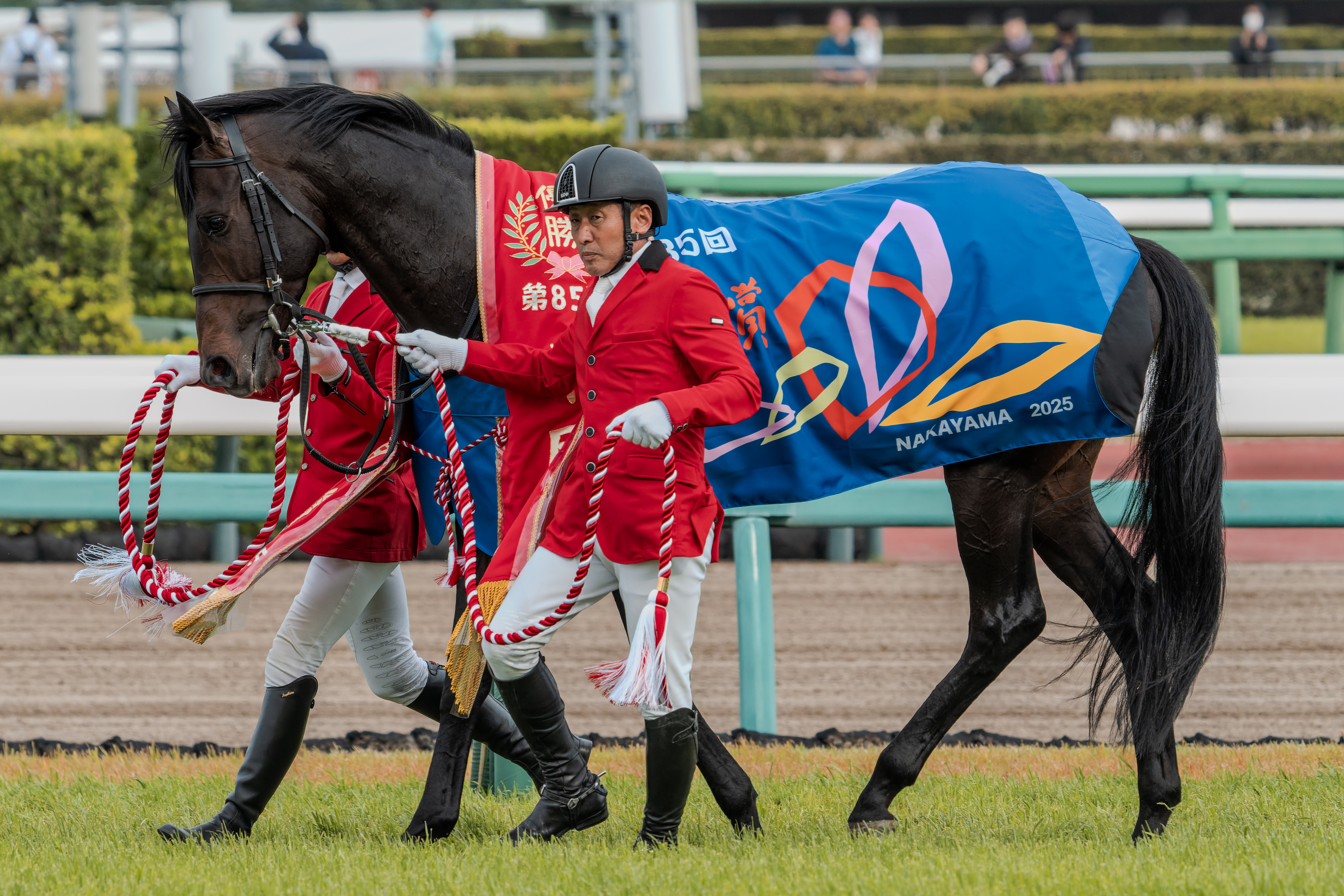
- Museum Mile after winning the 2025 Satsuki Sho
- Sire: Leontes
- Grandsire: King Kamehameha
- Dam: Museum Hill
- Damsire: Heart's Cry
- Sex: Colt
- Foaled: January 10, 2022 (age 4)
- Country: Japan
- Color: Bay
- Breeder: Northern Farm
- Owner: Sunday Racing
- Racing colours
- Trainer: Daisuke Takayanagi
- Jockey: Cristian Demuro; Joao Moreira
- Record: 11: 5-2-1
- Earnings: 961,799,000 JPY

Major wins
- St Lite Kinen (2025); Arima Kinen (2025); Japanese Classic Race wins: Satsuki Shō (2025)

Awards
- JRA Award for Best Three-Year-Old Colt (2025)
- Last updated on June 14, 2026

Museum Mile (Japanese: ミュージアムマイル, Hepburn: Myūjiamu Mairu; foaled January 10, 2022) is an active Japanese Thoroughbred racehorse best known for winning the Satsuki Shō and the Arima Kinen in 2025. At the end of his 2025 season, he was awarded the JRA Award for Best Three-Year-Old Colt.

He was named after a section of Fifth Avenue in New York City where major museums are located.

== Racing career ==
=== 2024: two-year-old season ===
Museum Mile debuted on August 24, 2024, in a two-year-old maiden race at Chukyo Racecourse over a distance of 1,800 meters on turf, under jockey Hideaki Miyuki. Starting as the fourth favorite, he broke slowly and raced from the rear. He ran around the field on the third corner but finished third despite a late rally.

On October 5, he contested a two-year-old maiden race at Kyoto Racecourse. Tracking mid-pack, he responded strongly to the whip in the stretch, overtaking Shonan Caserta at the wire to secure his maiden victory by a nose.

His third start came in the Kigiku Sho on November 10 with jockey Cristian Demuro. Settling third-last early, he swung wide on the third turn, advanced to third by the final turn, and surged clear in the stretch to win by three lengths over Yamanin Bouclier, marking his second victory.

Museum Mile then targeted his first graded stakes race, the Asahi Hai Futurity Stakes on December 15. Starting as the second favorite, he recovered from a slow start to track the leaders along the rail. In the stretch, he chased Admire Zoom but could not overtake the winner, finishing second by a length.

=== 2025: three-year-old season ===
Museum Mile began his classic campaign in the Yayoi Sho on March 9, reuniting with Hideaki Miyuki. Starting as the top favorite ahead of other horses such as Naglfar and Vincentio, he raced mid-pack settling between horses. As Faust Rasen moved up at the back stretch, he advanced on the third turn but faded to fourth in the final stretch after being overtaken by Alohi Alii in the final strides.

For the Satsuki Sho (Japanese 2000 Guineas) on April 20, connections enlisted jockey João Moreira. Starting as the third favorite behind unbeaten top favorite and Triple Crown hopeful Croix du Nord and Satono Shining, he tracked mid-pack as the field chased a blistering pace of 59.3 seconds for the first half of the race. Swinging wide into the stretch, he unleashed a powerful late drive to overtake Croix du Nord in the final 200 meters, securing his grade 1 title.

Museum Mile would win two more times in 2025, first in the Grade 2 St Lite Kinen, and then the Grade 1 Arima Kinen which concluded the races he would enter during the Japanese racing year. The latter race saw the horse, this time ridden by Cristian Demuro, chase down surprise challenger Cosmo Kuranda in the final 100 metres to win by half a length.

=== 2026: four-year-old season ===
On 4 February, Sunday Racing Club announced that the invitation to the Dubai Turf (March 28, Meydan Racecourse) had been accepted. This race was set to be his first race in the 2026 season and his first overseas trip with Cristian Demuro scheduled to ride him. However, on March 15, it was announced that his planned participation in the Dubai Turf had been canceled due to the unstable political situation in the region. Then instead of this race Museum Mile was pre-registered to run in the Queen Elizabeth II Cup in Sha Tin, Hong Kong, scheduled for April 26. However, on March 12, it was announced that due to the condition he displayed during a video gait evaluation, he would not compete in the Queen Elizabeth II Cup either. Instead of racing, he was sent to pasture at Northern Farm.

On April 17 Sunday Racing Club announced that Museum Mile will run in the Takarazuka Kinen on June 14 with Damian Lane set to partner him for the first time since Japanese Derby. His trainer commented on his five-and-a-half-month break, "This is the longest layoff he has ever had, but I believe he is fully fit and ready." On May 21, he returned to the Ritto training center, where on the same day he clocked four furlongs in 57.1 with the splits of 40.8 seconds for last 400 meters and 13.4 for the final 200 meters on Ritto slope course. While the time which he clocked wasn't impressive his trainer was satisfied with effort. Takayanagi Daisuke said, "He's not the type of horse that posts extraordinary times on the slope course, so I think the clocking was more than adequate."

Croix du Nord, who lost to Museum Mile in the Satsuki Sho but then defeated him in the Derby have also been pre-entered for the Takarazuka Kinen. This will be their first meeting since the Japanese Derby. On the day, Museum Mile roaming around in the sixth position in the early phase of the race under the direction of Damian Lane as his jockey. Coming into the homestretch, he tried to advance further but lacked the needed kick and surrounded by late finishers, ended up in ninth-place. Lane spoke about the lack of final speed afterward, "I got a good position at the start. I was able to settle down and run at a good rhythm and I was confident. But after the pace picked up, I couldn't use my usual finishing speed."

== Racing statistics ==
Below data is based on data available on JBIS Search, and NetKeiba.

Date	Track	Race	Grade	Distance (Condition)	Entry	HN	Odds (Favored)	Finish	Time	Margins	Jockey	Winner (Runner-up)
2024 – two-year-old season
Aug 24	Chukyo	2YO Debut		1,600 m (Firm)	16	1	5.4 (4)	3rd	1:35.3	0.4	Hideaki Miyuki	Shonan Raffine
Oct 5	Kyoto	2YO Maiden		1,800 m (Firm)	8	4	1.9 (1)	1st	1:46.8	-0.2	Hideaki Miyuki	(Shonan Caserta)
Nov 10	Kyoto	Kigiku Sho	1 Win	2,000 m (Firm)	8	2	1.9 (1)	1st	2:00.0	-0.5	Cristian Demuro	(Yamanin Bouclier)
Dec 15	Kyoto	Asahi Hai FS	GI	1,600 m (Firm)	16	4	3.7 (2)	2nd	1:34.5	0.4	Cristian Demuro	Admire Zoom
2025 – three-year-old season
Mar 9	Nakayama	Yayoi Sho	GII	2,000 m (Good)	14	11	2.9 (1)	4th	2:01.5	0.2	Hideaki Miyuki	Faust Rasen
Apr 20	Nakayama	Satsuki Shō	GI	2,000 m (Firm)	18	11	10.6 (3)	1st	1:57.0 (Note: Broke the race record.)	-0.3	João Moreira	(Croix du Nord)
Jun 1	Tokyo	Tōkyō Yūshun	GI	2,400 m (Firm)	18	7	5.7 (2)	6th	2:24.4	0.7	Damian Lane	Croix du Nord
Sep 15	Nakayama	St Lite Kinen	GII	2,200 m (Firm)	12	6	2.6 (1)	1st	2:10.8	-0.1	Keita Tosaki	(Yamanin Bouclier)
Nov 2	Tokyo	Tenno Sho (Autumn)	GI	2,000 m (Firm)	14	9	7.4 (3)	2nd	1:58.7	0.1	Cristian Demuro	Masquerade Ball
Dec 28	Nakayama	Arima Kinen	GI	2,500 m (Firm)	16	4	3.8 (3)	1st	2:31.5	-0.1	Cristian Demuro	(Cosmo Kuranda)
2026 – four-year-old season
Jun 14	Hanshin	Takarazuka Kinen	GI	2,200 m (Yielding)	18	2	7.1 (4)	9th	2:13.7	1.6	Damian Lane	Meisho Tabaru

Legend:
Turf

== Pedigree ==
Pedigree of Museum Mile (JPN), bay colt, 2022
Sire Leontes dk. b. 2013	King Kamehameha b. 2001	Kingmambo (USA)	Mr. Prospector
Sire Leontes dk. b. 2013	King Kamehameha b. 2001	Kingmambo (USA)	Miesque
Sire Leontes dk. b. 2013	King Kamehameha b. 2001	Manfath (IRE)	Last Tycoon
Sire Leontes dk. b. 2013	King Kamehameha b. 2001	Manfath (IRE)	Pilot Bird (GB)
Sire Leontes dk. b. 2013	Cesario blk. 2002	Special Week	Sunday Silence (USA)
Sire Leontes dk. b. 2013	Cesario blk. 2002	Special Week	Campaign Girl
Sire Leontes dk. b. 2013	Cesario blk. 2002	Kirov Premiere (GB)	Sadler's Wells (USA)
Sire Leontes dk. b. 2013	Cesario blk. 2002	Kirov Premiere (GB)	Querida (IRE)
Dam Museum Hill b. 2015	Heart's Cry b. 2001	Sunday Silence (USA)	Halo
Dam Museum Hill b. 2015	Heart's Cry b. 2001	Sunday Silence (USA)	Wishing Well
Dam Museum Hill b. 2015	Heart's Cry b. 2001	Irish Dance	Tony Bin (IRE)
Dam Museum Hill b. 2015	Heart's Cry b. 2001	Irish Dance	Buper Dance (USA)
Dam Museum Hill b. 2015	Loretto Chapel b. 2003	French Deputy (USA)	Deputy Minister (CAN)
Dam Museum Hill b. 2015	Loretto Chapel b. 2003	French Deputy (USA)	Mitterand
Dam Museum Hill b. 2015	Loretto Chapel b. 2003	Santa Fe Trail	Northern Taste (CAN)
Dam Museum Hill b. 2015	Loretto Chapel b. 2003	Santa Fe Trail	Happy Trails (IRE) (Family: 4-d)

- His half-sister, Festival Hill, won the 2025 Fantasy Stakes
- His granddam Loretto Chapel's half-brother is King's Trail who won the 2005 St Lite Kinen and the 2007 Keisei Hai Autumn Handicap.
- His great granddam Santa Fe Trail's half-sisters, Shinko Lovely who won the 1993 Mile Championship, and Happy Path who won the 2003 Kyoto Himba Stakes.
- His close relatives include Cervinia, who won the 2024 Yushun Himba and 2024 Shūka Sho, is the grand daughter of Happy Path from Happy Trails.
- He is also closely related to the 2026 Nikkei Sho, My Universe, by Church Choir from Loretto Chapel.
