= Energico (horse) =

Japanese thoroughbred racehorse

Energico エネルジコ
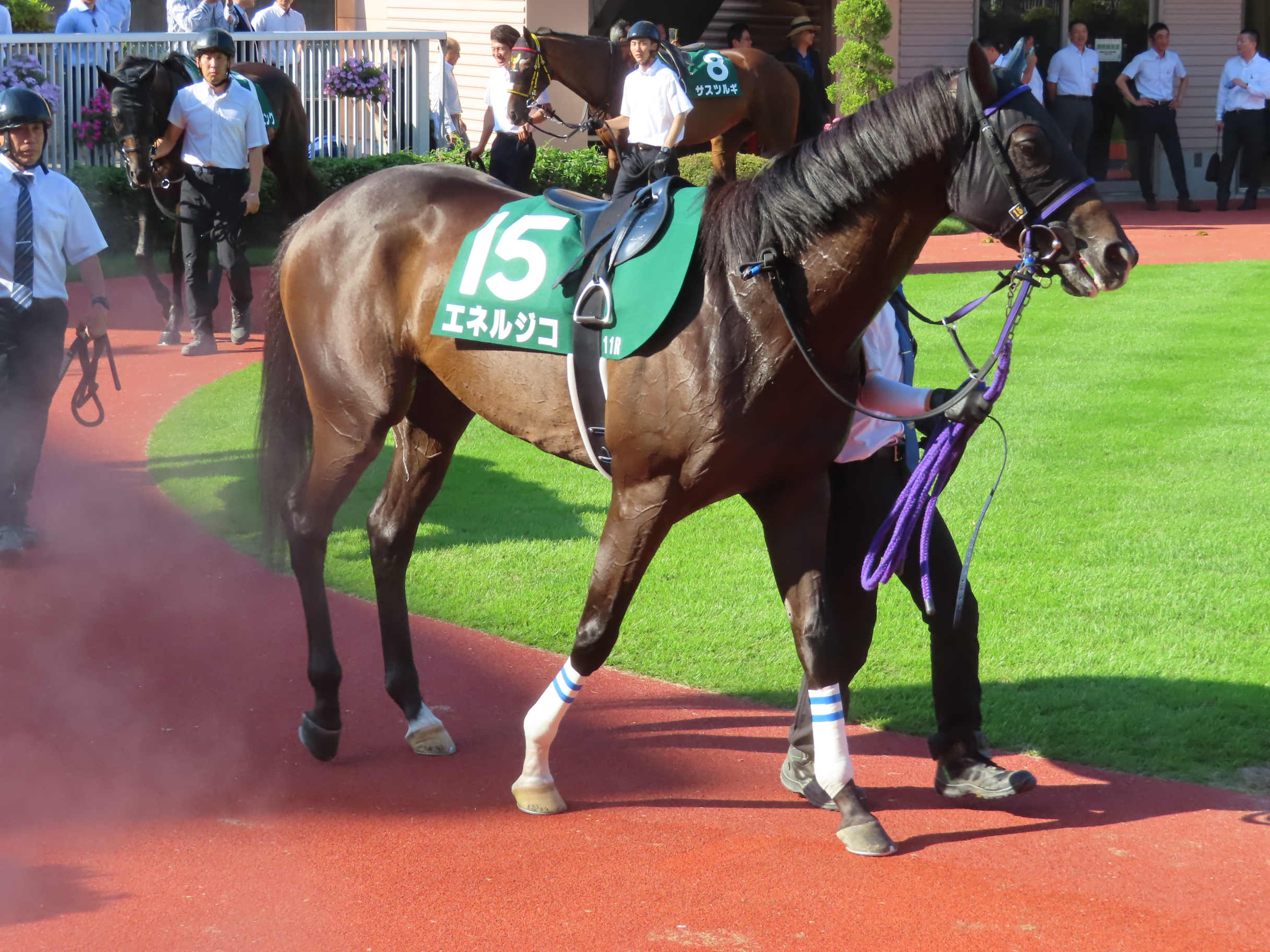
- Energico before the 2025 Niigata Kinen
- Breed: Thoroughbred
- Sire: Duramente
- Grandsire: King Kamehameha
- Dam: Enora
- Damsire: Noverre
- Sex: Colt
- Foaled: April 23, 2022 (age 4)
- Color: Dark bay
- Breeder: Northern Farm
- Owner: Silk Racing
- Racing colours
- Trainer: Mizuki Takayanagi
- Jockey: Christophe Lemaire
- Record: 5:4-1-0
- Earnings: 318,219,000 JPY

Major wins
- Aoba Sho (2025); Japanese Classic Race wins: Kikuka-shō (2025)
- Last updated on December 15, 2025

Energico (エネルジコ, foaled April 23, 2022), is a Japanese racehorse. His major wins include the 2025 Aoba Sho and 2025 Kikuka Sho.

== Background ==
Energico was foaled out of Enora who won Preis der Diana in 2010. He was sired by Duramente, the 2015 Japanese double crown winner and also 2023 Leading sire in Japan.

His name inspired by an Italian word which meant powerful and was associated with both of his parents.

== Race career ==
=== Two-year-old season (2024) ===
He only raced once in his two-year-old season, participating in his debut race on October 20 in Tokyo. He started from the back of the pack and overtook all the other horses in the straight, earning his first victory in his debut race.

=== Three-year-old season (2025) ===
He started the season with Saintpaulia Sho in Tokyo. Despite a slow start, he made a strong run on the outside straight to win his second consecutive race. His father, Duramente, had also won the same race in 2015, making this the second generation of father and son to achieve this feat. On April 26, He ran in Aoba Sho which was his first graded race. He made a significant spurt from behind to win the race for his third win in a row since his debut and first graded race win. The win qualified him for Tokyo Yushun but did not participate due to illness.

In the autumn, he ran in the Niigata Kinen. He finished strong at second place in his comeback behind Shirankedo. This race result guaranteed a spot in the Kikuka-shō. During the race, he started very well and was in rhythm throughout the early phase. Christophe Lemaire, who was his jockey that day, started to accelerate on the third corner uphill before using the fourth corner downhill slope exit and quickly made the grounds. In the final straight, he was in the fifth position and surged quickly and surpassed the four horses ahead of him, including Eri King, who was at the lead, winning him the race. With this win, Lemaire himself won Kikuka Sho three times in a row, with Durezza in 2023 and Urban Chic in 2024. After the Kikuka-shō, Energico suffered a left fore superficial digital flexor tendonitis which sidelined him for a lengthened period of time.

== Racing form ==
The data available is based on JBIS and netkeiba.

Date	Track	Race	Grade	Distance (Condition)	Entry	HN	Odds (Favored)	Finish	Time	Margin	Jockey	Winner (Runner-up)
2024 – two-year-old season
Oct 20	Tokyo	2YO Debut		1,800m (Firm)	18	7	4.8 (2)	1st	1:48.5	–0.2	Akihide Tsumura	(Navaratna)
2025 – three-year-old season
Feb 2	Tokyo	Saintpaulia Sho	1W	1,800m (Firm)	13	11	3.0 (1)	1st	1:48.2	–0.2	Kenichi Ikezoe	(Mikki Madonna)
Apr 26	Tokyo	Aoba Sho	2	2,400m (Firm)	13	10	2.6 (1)	1st	2:24.8	–0.1	Christophe Lemaire	(Feiern Kranz)
Aug 31	Niigata	Niigata Kinen	3	2,000m (Firm)	16	15	3.0 (1)	2nd	1:58.1	0.1	Christophe Lemaire	Shirankedo
Oct 26	Kyoto	Kikuka-shō	1	3,000m (Good)	18	9	3.8 (1)	1st	3:04.0	–0.3	Christophe Lemaire	(Eri King)

== Pedigree ==
Pedigree of Energico
Sire Duramente b. 2012	King Kamehameha b. 2001	Kingmambo	Mr. Prospector
Sire Duramente b. 2012	King Kamehameha b. 2001	Kingmambo	Miesque
Sire Duramente b. 2012	King Kamehameha b. 2001	Manfath	Last Tycoon
Sire Duramente b. 2012	King Kamehameha b. 2001	Manfath	Pilot Bird
Sire Duramente b. 2012	Admire Groove b. 2000	Sunday Silence	Halo
Sire Duramente b. 2012	Admire Groove b. 2000	Sunday Silence	Wishing Well
Sire Duramente b. 2012	Admire Groove b. 2000	Air Groove	Tony Bin
Sire Duramente b. 2012	Admire Groove b. 2000	Air Groove	Dyna Carle
Dam Enora ch. 2007	Noverre b. 1998	Rahy	Blushing Groom
Dam Enora ch. 2007	Noverre b. 1998	Rahy	Glorious Song
Dam Enora ch. 2007	Noverre b. 1998	Danseur Fabuleux	Northern Dancer
Dam Enora ch. 2007	Noverre b. 1998	Danseur Fabuleux	Fabuleux Jane
Dam Enora ch. 2007	Enrica ch. 1994	Niniski	Nijinsky
Dam Enora ch. 2007	Enrica ch. 1994	Niniski	Virginia Hills
Dam Enora ch. 2007	Enrica ch. 1994	Eicidura	Surumu
Dam Enora ch. 2007	Enrica ch. 1994	Eicidura	Envira (Family: 19)

- Energico is inbred 4 x 5 to Halo (Glorious Song's sire) and 4 x 5 to Northern Dancer (Nijinsky's sire)
