= Duramente =

Japanese-bred Thoroughbred racehorse

Duramente ドゥラメンテ
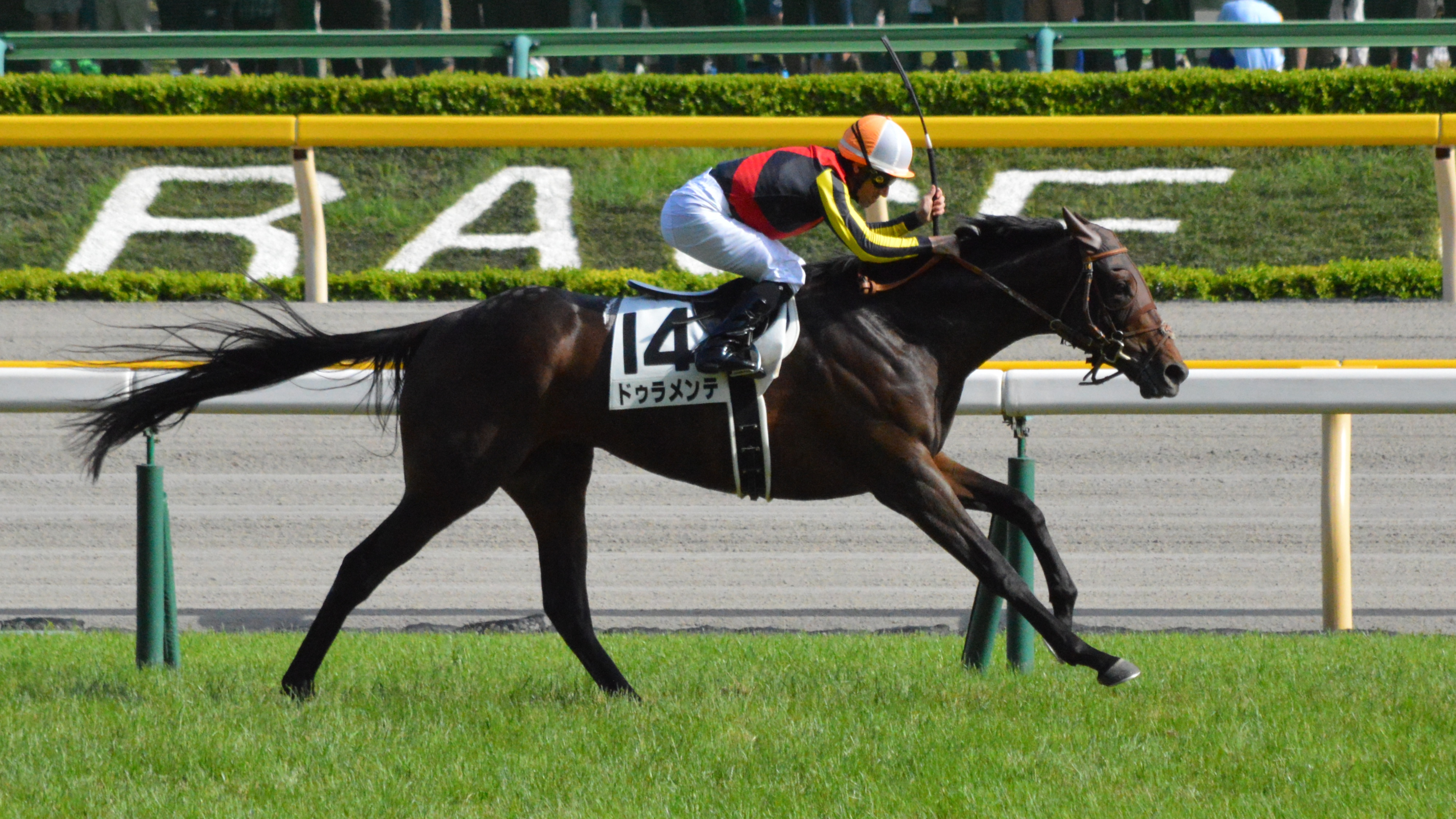
- Duramente winning the 2015 Tōkyō Yūshun.
- Breed: Thoroughbred
- Sire: King Kamehameha (JPN)
- Grandsire: Kingmambo (USA)
- Dam: Admire Groove (JPN)
- Damsire: Sunday Silence (USA)
- Sex: Stallion
- Foaled: March 22, 2012
- Died: August 31, 2021 (aged 9)
- Country: Japan
- Colour: Bay
- Breeder: Northern Farm
- Owner: Sunday Racing Co. Ltd.
- Racing colours
- Trainer: Noriyuki Hori
- Jockey: Mirco Demuro
- Record: 9: 5-4-0
- Earnings: ¥516,607,000

Major wins
- Nakayama Kinen (2016); Japanese Classic Race wins: Satsuki Shō (2015); Tokyo Yūshun (2015)

Awards
- JRA Award for Best Three-Year-Old Colt (2015)

Honours
- Leading sire in Japan (2023)

Duramente (Japanese: ドゥラメンテ, Hepburn: Duramente; 22 March 2012 – 31 August 2021) was a Japanese Thoroughbred racehorse and sire. In 2015, he completed the first two legs of the Japanese Triple Crown by winning the Satsuki Shō and the Tokyo Yūshun before his season was ended by injuries. He returned in 2016 to win the Nakayama Kinen and finish second in the Dubai Sheema Classic before his racing career was ended by a leg injury sustained when he slipped after the finish of the Takarazuka Kinen. He had an excellent career as a breeding stallion before dying at the age of nine.

== Background ==
Duramente was a bay horse with a white coronet marking on his left hind leg, bred in Japan by Northern Farm. His sire, King Kamehameha was one of the best Japanese colts of his generation, beating a field including Heart's Cry and Daiwa Major in the 2004 Japanese Derby. His other winners as a breeding stallion include Lord Kanaloa, Rose Kingdom, Belshazzar (Japan Cup Dirt), Rulership (Queen Elizabeth II Cup), Apapane and Rey de Oro. Duramente's dam Admire Groove was a top-class racemare who twice won the Queen Elizabeth II Commemorative Cup and was voted the Best Older Filly or Mare in Japan in 2004. She was a daughter of Sunday Silence and Air Groove, a mare who won the Yushun Himba and the Tenno Sho and was voted Japanese Horse of the Year in 1997.

During his racing career, Duramente (Italian for hard) has been owned by Sunday Racing Co. Ltd. and trained by Noriyuki Hori.

== Racing career ==
=== 2014: two-year-old season ===
Duramente began his racing career in a maiden race over 1800 metres at Tokyo Racecourse on 12 October and finished second of the eleven runners behind Love Your Man. In a similar race at the same course a month later he recorded his first victory, beating Shonen Harakasu and twelve others.

=== 2015: three-year-old season ===
On his first appearance as a three-year-old, Duramente won the Saintpaulia Sho over 1800 metres at Tokyo on 1 February. Two weeks later over the same course and distance, the colt was moved up in class to contest the Grade 3 Kyodo Tsushin Hai. Ridden by Syu Ishibashi he started 4/5 favourite in a twelve-runner field but was beaten half a length by Sunday Racing's other runner Real Steel.

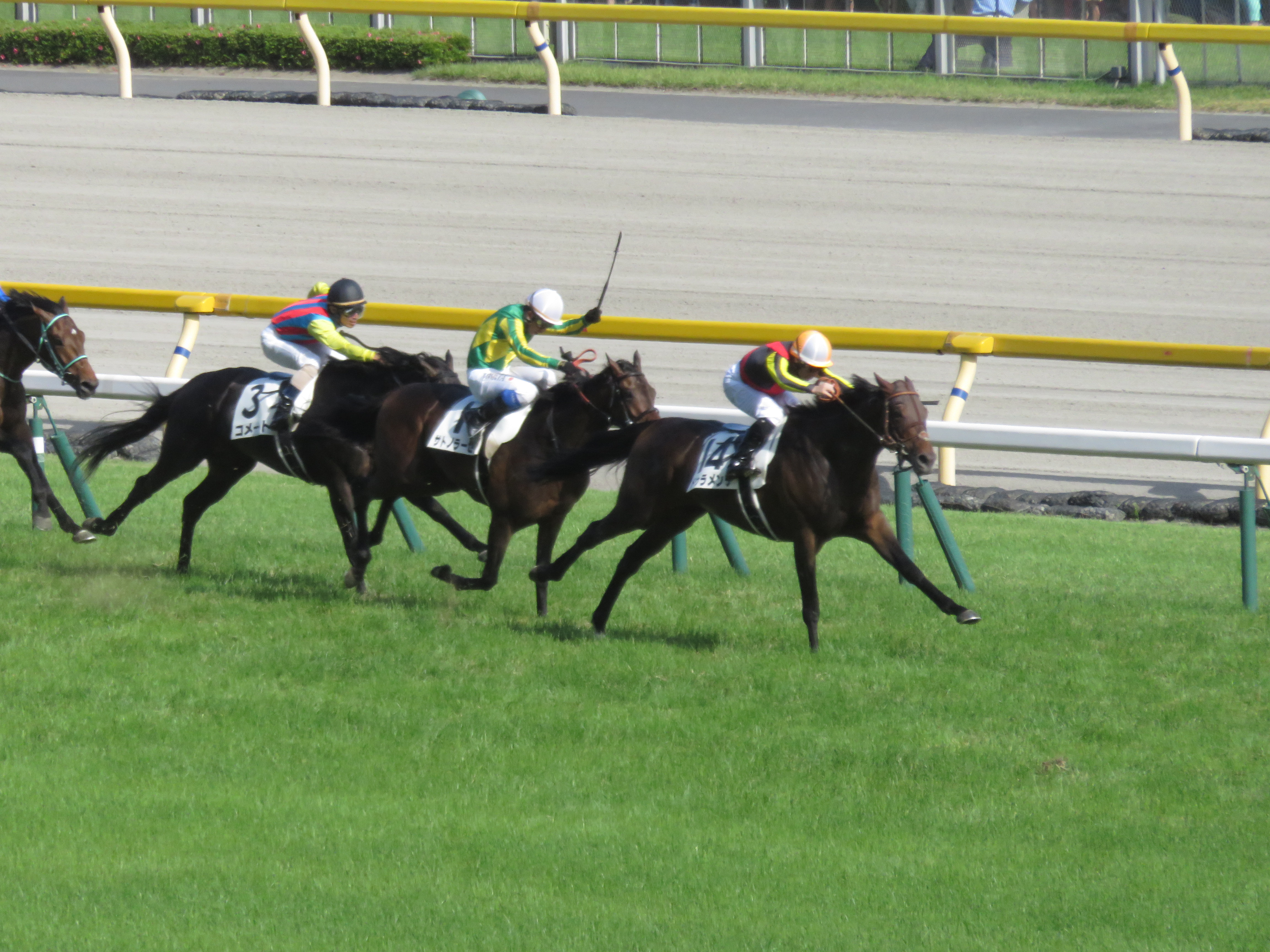
Duramente wins the Tokyo Yushun

On 19 April Duramente was ridden by Mirco Demuro when he was one of fifteen colts to contest the 75th running of the Grade 1 Satsuki Sho over 2000 metres at Nakayama Racecourse. The Italian Demuro had recently become one of the first two foreign jockeys (alongside Christophe Lemaire) to receive a full license from the Japan Racing Association. Duramente started 3.6/1 third choice in the betting behind Satono Crown (also trained by Noriyuki Hori) and Real Steel. After racing towards the rear of the field he made a forward move approaching the final turn but veered left, interfering with several other horses when Demuro moved him up to challenge entering the straight. In the closing stages the colt produced a strong burst of acceleration to take the lead 100 metres from the finish and won by one and a half lengths from Real Steel with Kitasan Black two and a half lengths back in third. Demuro, who received a suspension for causing interference said, "He was easy to ride early in the race but he's very highly strung, it was his first time going right-handed and the crowd was very loud too so he may have over-reacted at the fourth corner—he gave me a bit of a fright".

Six weeks after his win at Nakayama, Duramente started favourite for the 82nd Tokyo Yushun (Japanese Derby) over 2400 metres at Tokyo. After racing in eighth place he moved up as the field fanned wide on the final turn. He took the lead approaching the last 200 metres and won by one and three quarter lengths from Satono Rasen with Satono Crown in third. Duramente's winning time of 2:23.2 was a new race record, breaking the mark set by his sire King Kamehameha in 2004. Demuro commented "I'm so full of joy and gratitude to have been able to accomplish this with such a powerful and talented colt and especially as an official JRA jockey".

In late June it was announced that Duramente had sustained "distal fractures" to both of his front legs and would be unable to race again for at least six months. He did not appear again in 2015.

=== 2016: four-year-old season ===
Duramente returned after an absence of almost nine months in the Nakayama Kinen on 28 February. Starting the 11/10 favourite he took the lead on the outside on the final turn and held off a late challenge from Ambitious to win by a neck. He was then sent to the United Arab Emirates to contest the Dubai Sheema Classic on 26 March. He lost a shoe before the race and as it could not be replaced he competed in the race with three shoes. He finished second behind the British-trained five-year-old Postponed. The colt took a long time to recover from the race and did not reappear until 26 June when he was made the 1.9/1 favourite for the Takarazuka Kinen at Hanshin. He was restrained towards the rear of the seventeen runner field before being switched to the outside to deliver his run in the straight. Duramente made up a great deal of ground, passing horse after horse in the closing stages, but failed by a neck to catch the mare Marialite. The colt slipped crossing the finishing line sustaining serious injury to his left foreleg and a subsequent veterinary examination revealed extensive damage to his fetlock, pastern and tendons. Three days after the Takarazuka Kinen it was announced that Duramente was to be retired from racing and would stand as a breeding stallion at Shadai Stallion Station in 2017. Mirco Demuro commented "I'm shocked. Duramente's the strongest horse I've ever ridden".

== Assessment and awards ==
In the JRA Awards for 2015, Duramente was voted Best Three-Year-Old Colt taking 285 of the 291 votes. In the poll for Japanese Horse of the Year he finished third in the voting behind Maurice and Lovely Day.

== Stud record ==
Despite his short living stud-career of a mere five generations, in his first season as a breeding stallion Duramente sired the 2021 Kikuka Sho, 2022 Tenno Sho (Spring) and Takarazuka Kinen winner Titleholder, while his second crop of foals included the 2022 Ōka Shō and Yushun Himba winner Stars on Earth, and his third crop foals included 2022 Hopeful Stakes winner Dura Erede, 2023 NHK Mile Cup winner Champagne Color, 2023 Kikuka Sho winner Durezza and Liberty Island, the Fillies' Triple Crown of 2023 as well as the winner of Hanshin Juvenile Fillies in 2022. He died on 31 August 2021 due to acute colitis at the age of nine. He posthumously won the title of Leading sire in Japan for 2023.

=== Notable progeny ===
Below data is based on JBIS Stallion Reports.

c = colt, f = filly
bold = G1/Jpn1 stakes

Grade One winners
| Foaled | Name | Sex | Major Wins |
|---|---|---|---|
| 2018 | Titleholder | c | Yayoi Sho, **Kikuka-shō**, Nikkei Sho (twice), **Tennō Shō (Spring)**, **Takarazuka Kinen** |
| 2018 | Icon Tailor | f | **JBC Ladies' Classic** |
| 2019 | Stars on Earth | f | **Ōka Shō**, **Yushun Himba** |
| 2019 | Valle de la Luna | f | **JBC Ladies' Classic** |
| 2020 | Champagne Color | c | **NHK Mile Cup** |
| 2020 | Dura Erede | c | **Hopeful Stakes** |
| 2020 | Durezza | c | **Kikuka-shō** |
| 2020 | Liberty Island | f | **Hanshin Juvenile Fillies**, **Ōka Shō**, **Yushun Himba**, **Shūka Shō** |
| 2020 | Lugal | c | Silk Road Stakes, **Sprinters Stakes**, Hanshin Cup |
| 2022 | Energico | c | Aoba Sho, **Kikuka-shō** |
| 2022 | Masquerade Ball | c | Kyodo Tsushin Hai, **Tennō Shō (Autumn)** |

Other winners
| Foaled | Name | Sex | Major Wins |
|---|---|---|---|
| 2018 | Arrivo | c | Kokura Daishoten |
| 2018 | Avverare | f | Sekiya Kinen |
| 2018 | Badenweiler | c | Mercury Cup, Saga Kinen |
| 2018 | Fauvisme | c | Hyogo Gold Trophy |
| 2019 | Dinasta | c | Hanshin Spring Jump |
| 2019 | Sound Vivace | f | Hanshin Himba Stakes |
| 2020 | Dura | f | Sapporo Nisai Stakes, Queen Stakes |
| 2020 | Season Rich | c | Mainichi Hai |
| 2020 | Sing That Song | f | Fillies' Revue |
| 2021 | Mi Anhelo | f | Flower Cup |
| 2021 | Nishino Ti Amo | f | Fukushima Kinen |
| 2021 | Sugar Kun | c | Aoba Sho, Fuji Stakes |
| 2022 | Alohi Alii | c | Prix Guillaume d'Ornano |
| 2022 | Feiern Kranz | c | Meguro Kinen |
| 2022 | Kelly Fled Ask | f | Shion Stakes |
| 2022 | Maglia Iridata | f | Fukushima Kinen |

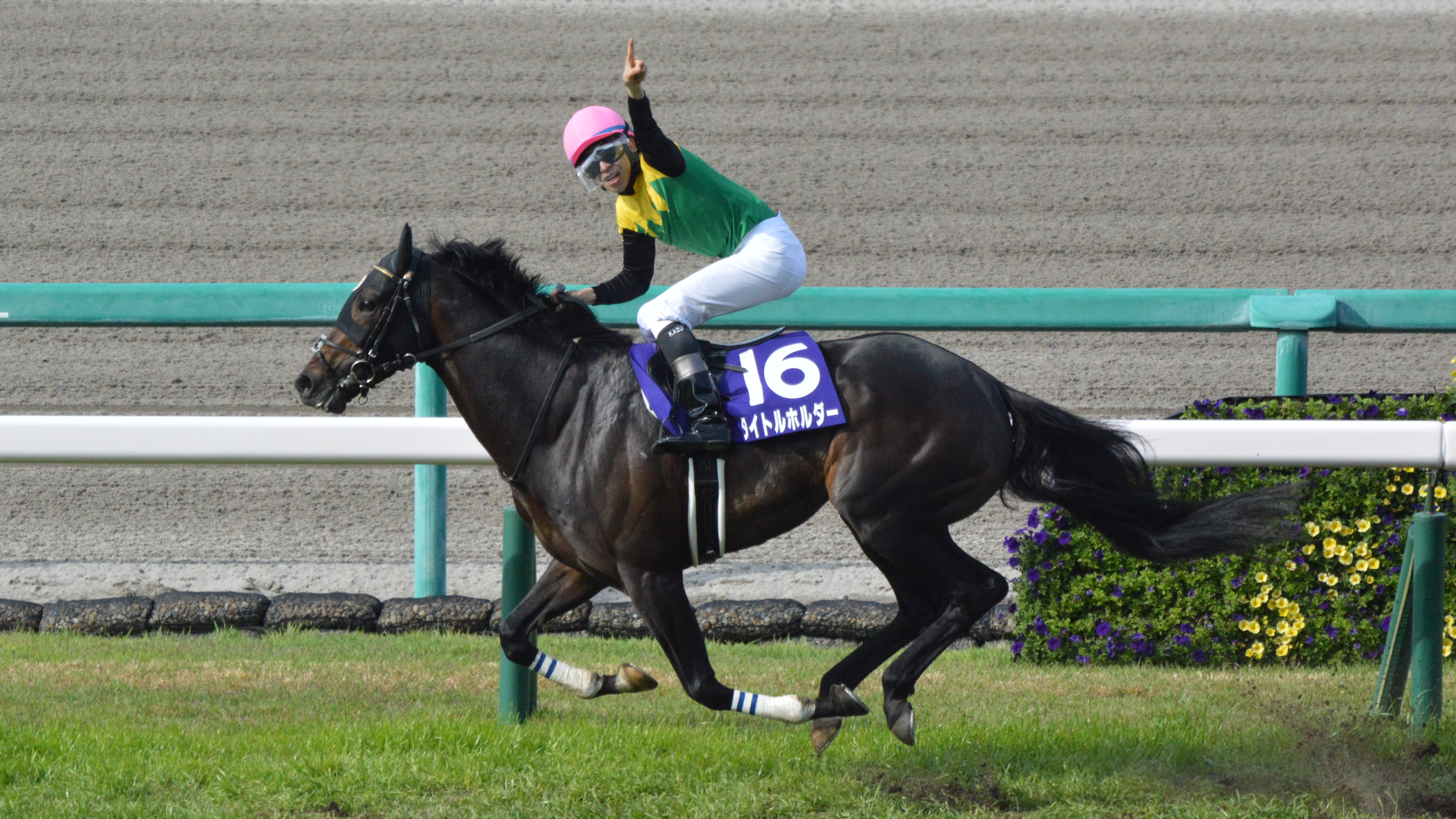
Titleholder

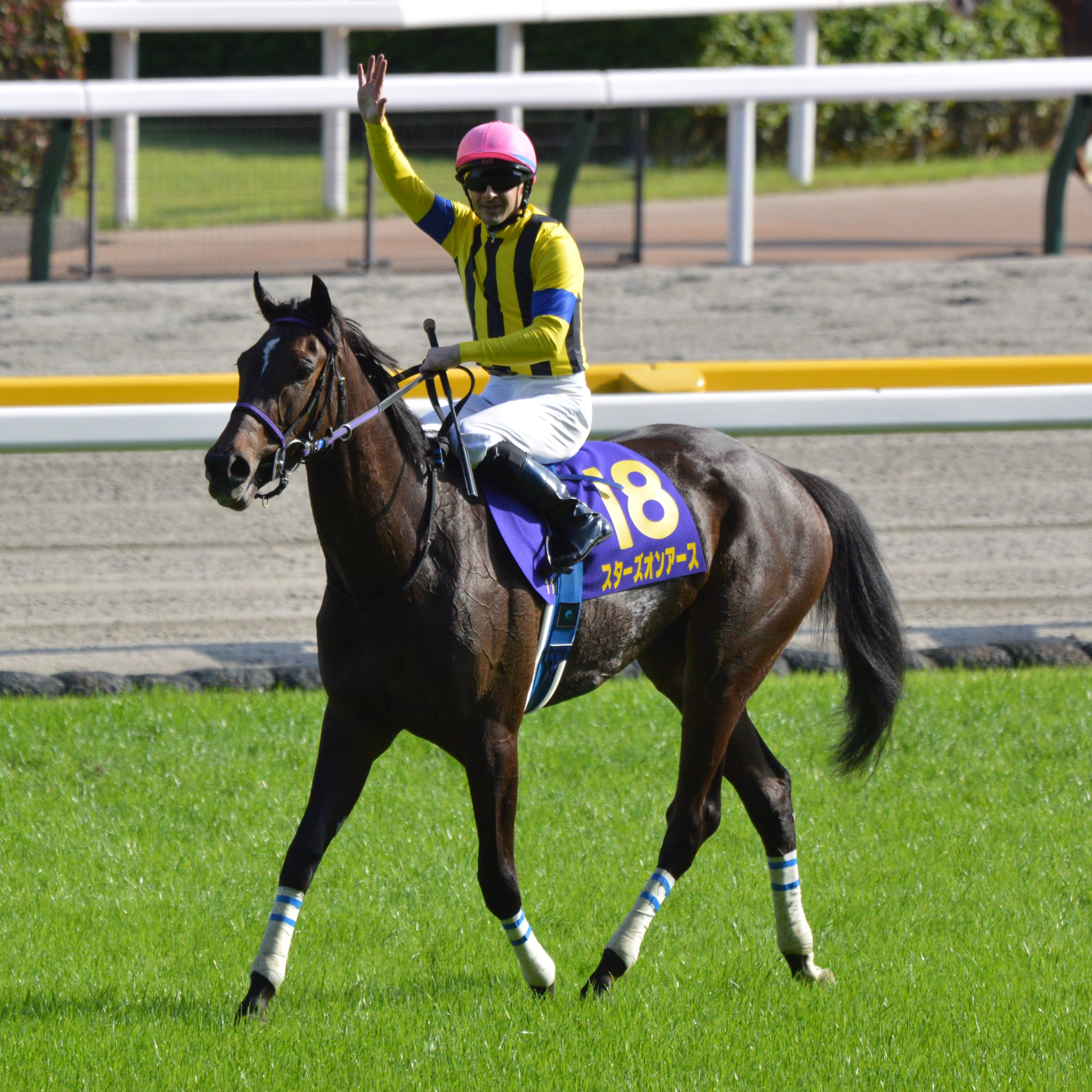
Stars on Earth

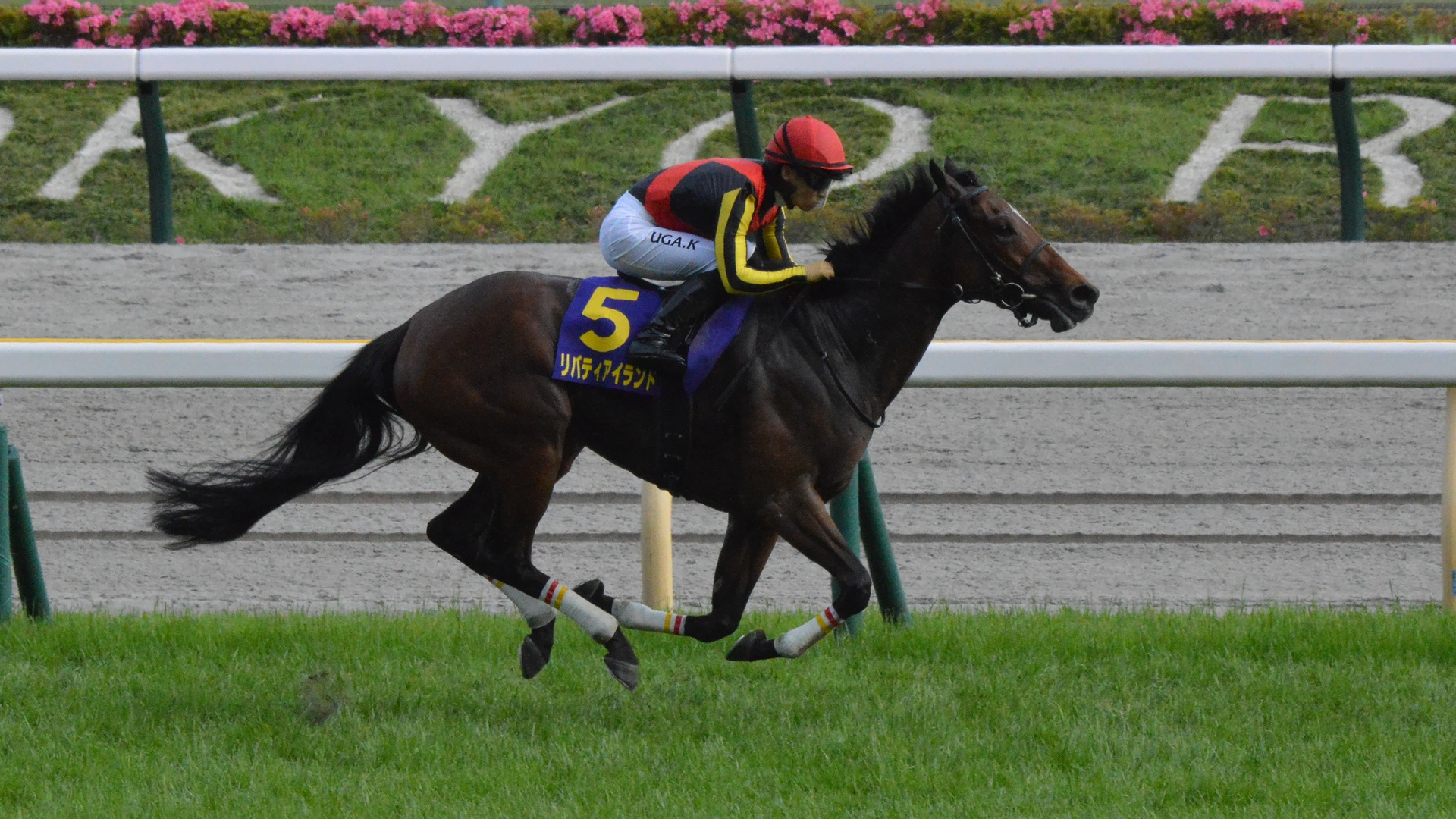
Liberty Island

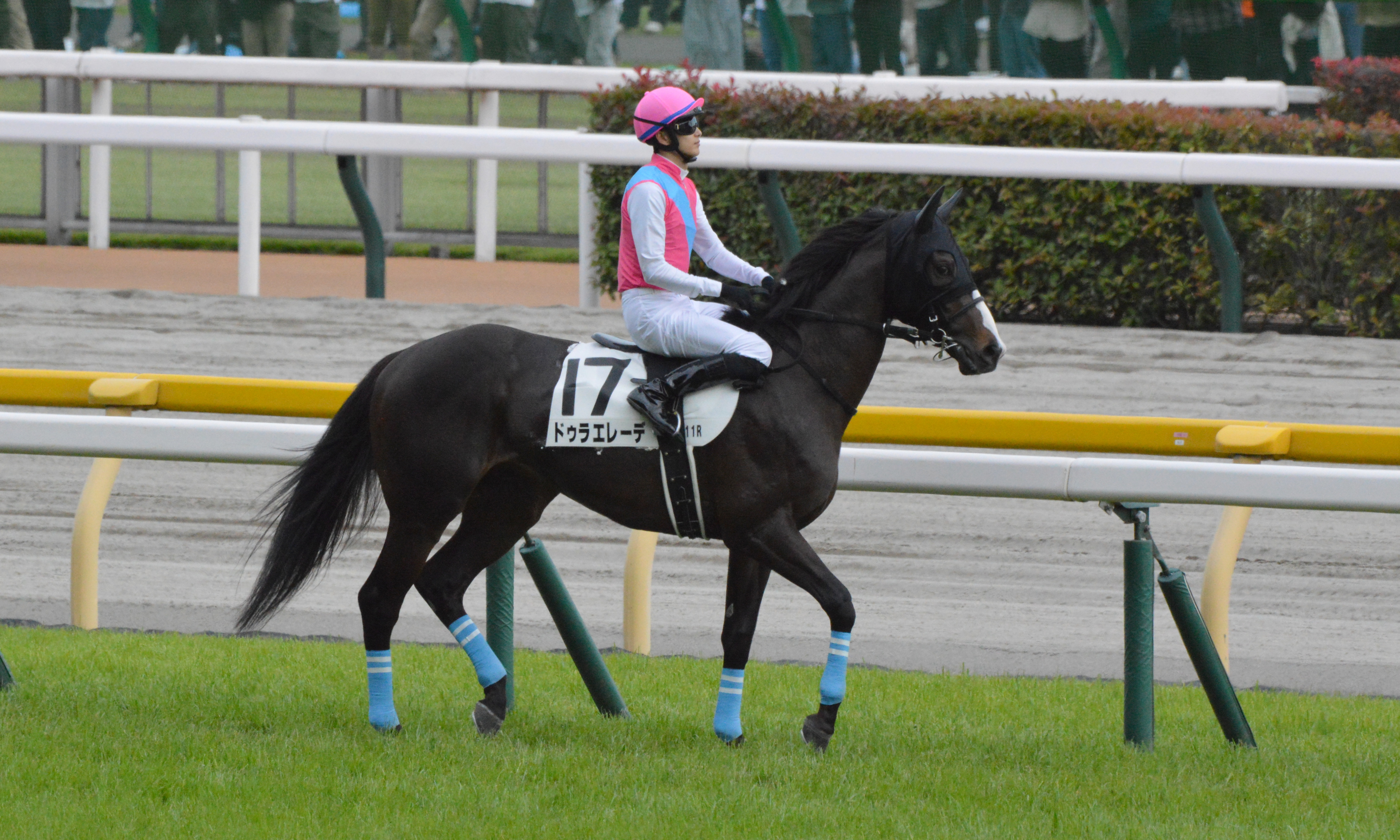
Dura Erede

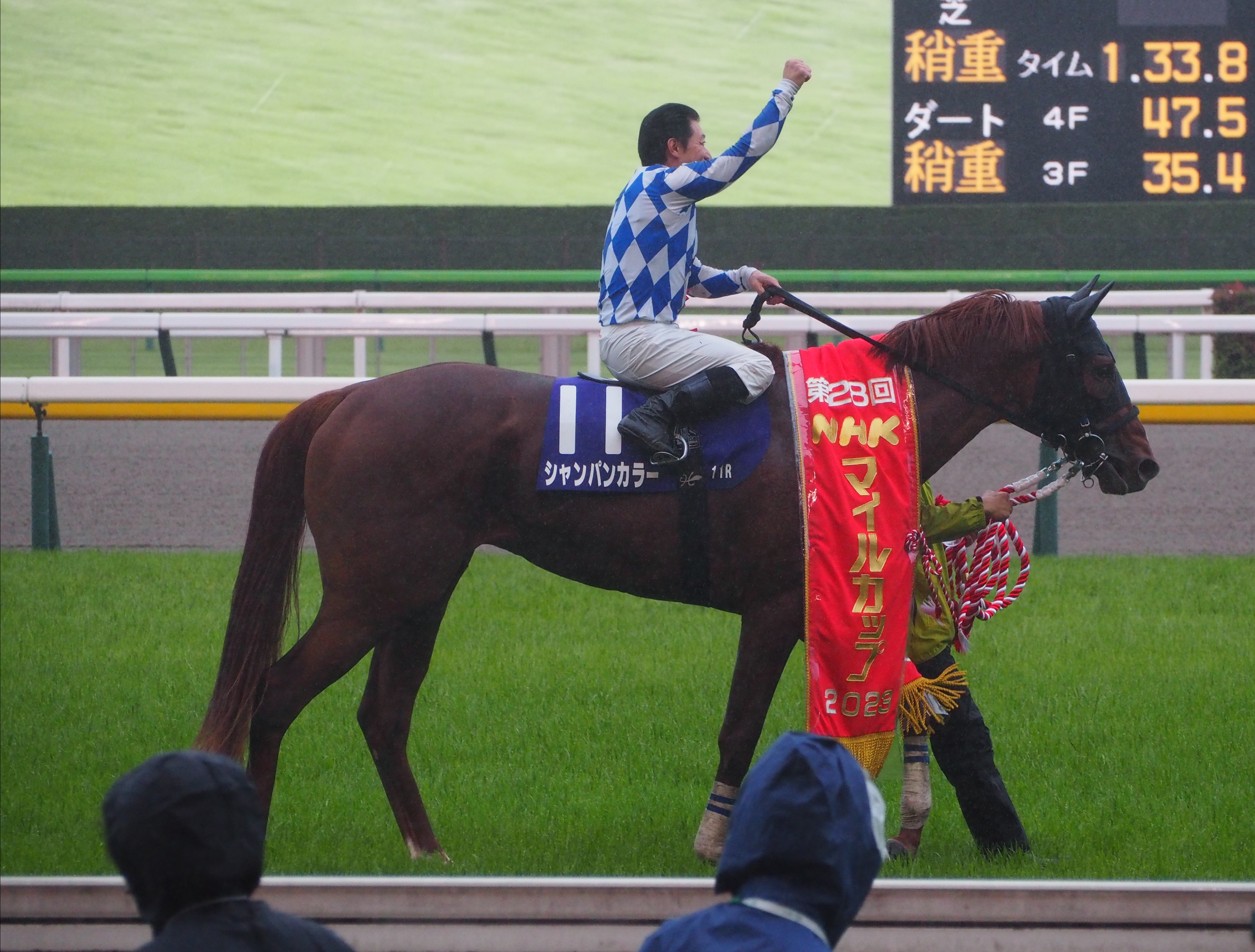
Champagne Color

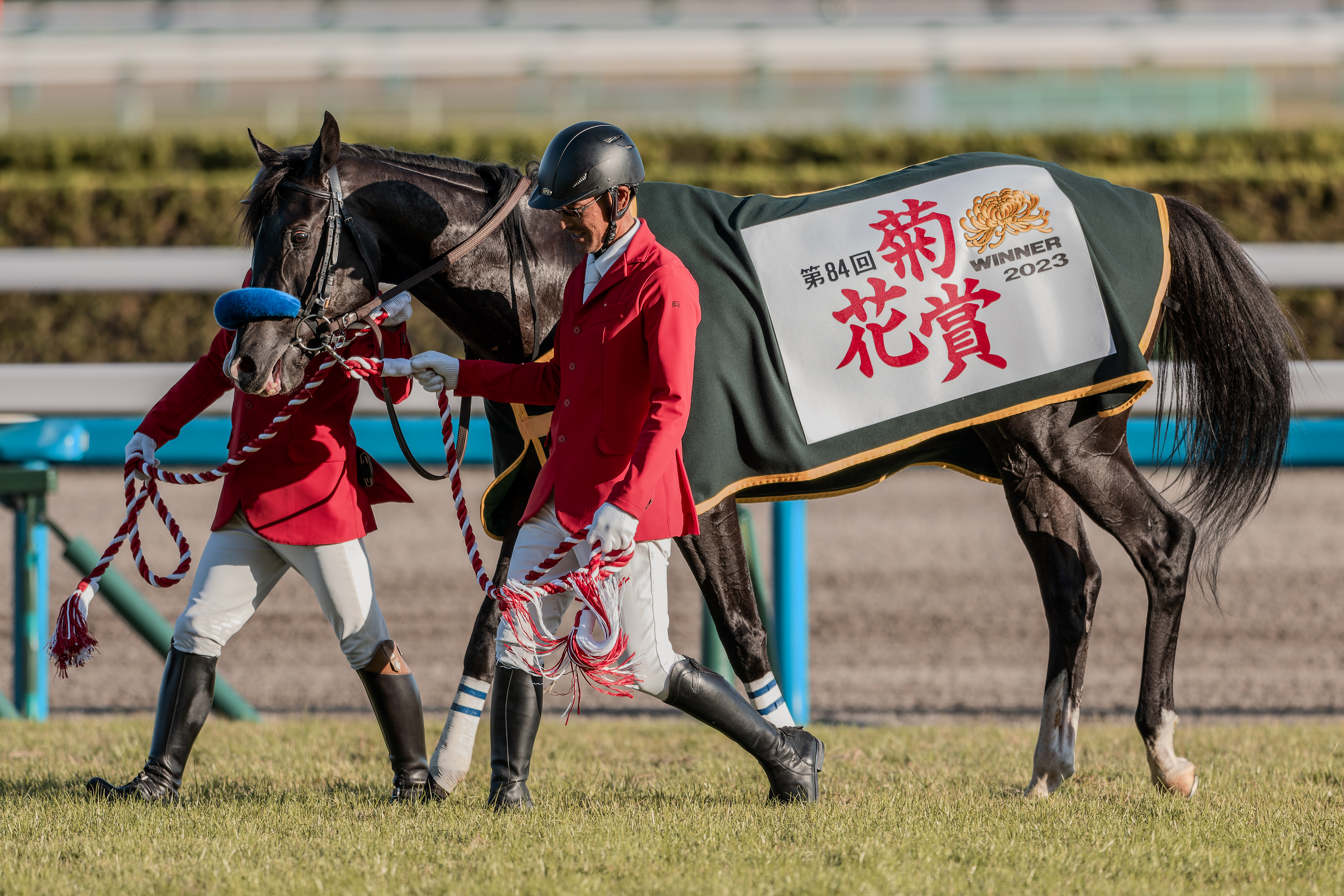
Durezza

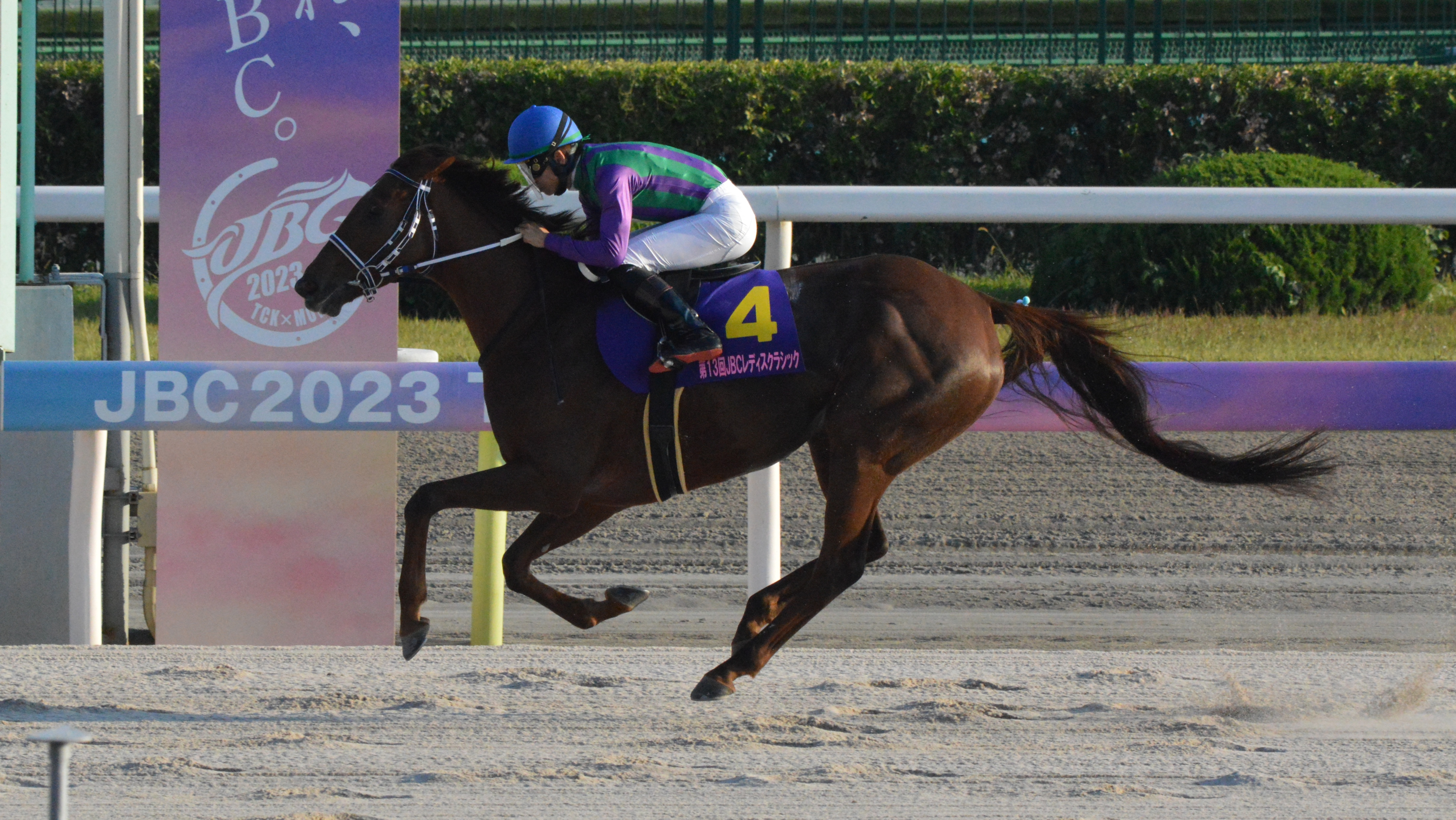
Icon Tailor

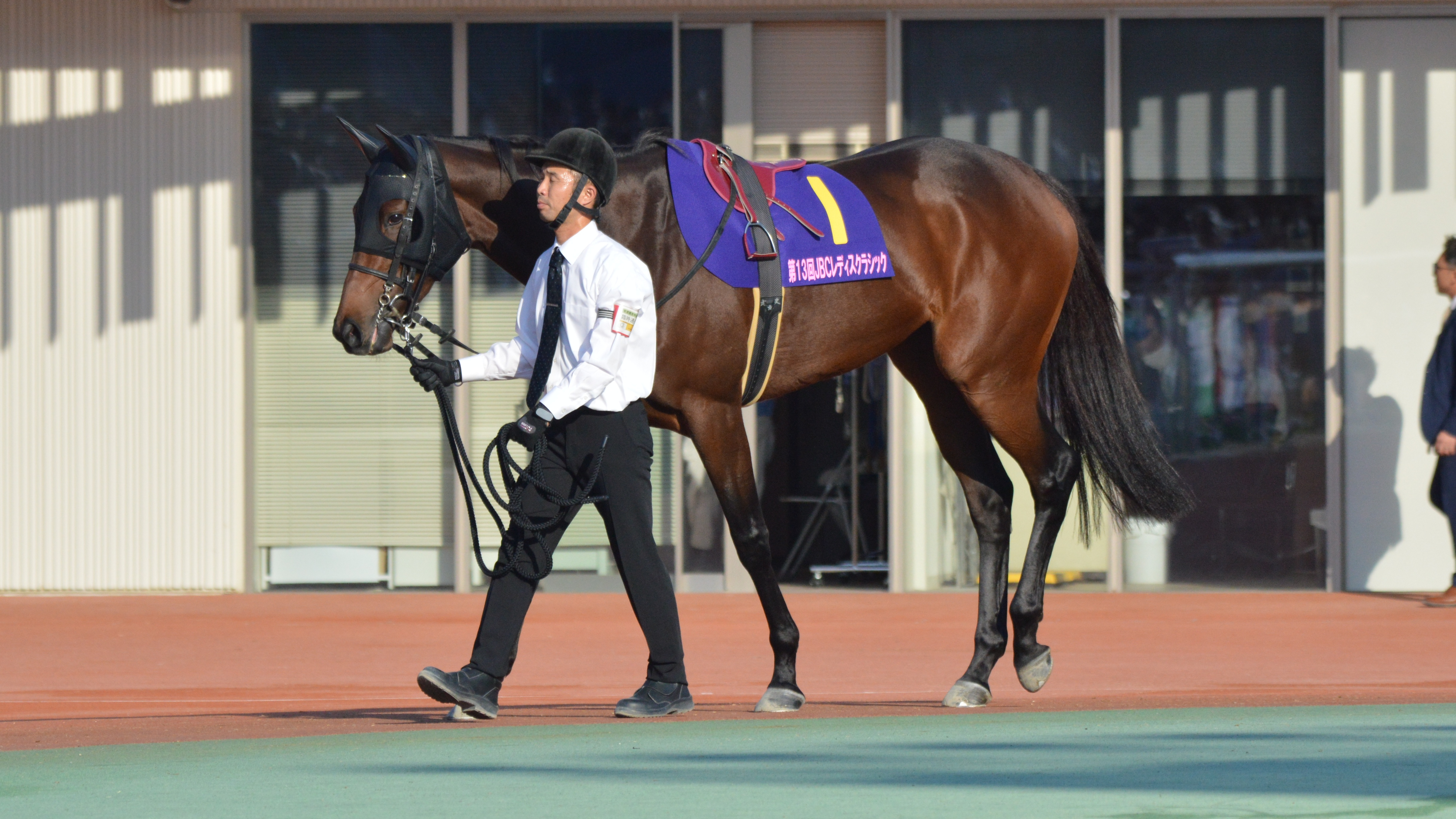
Valle de la Luna

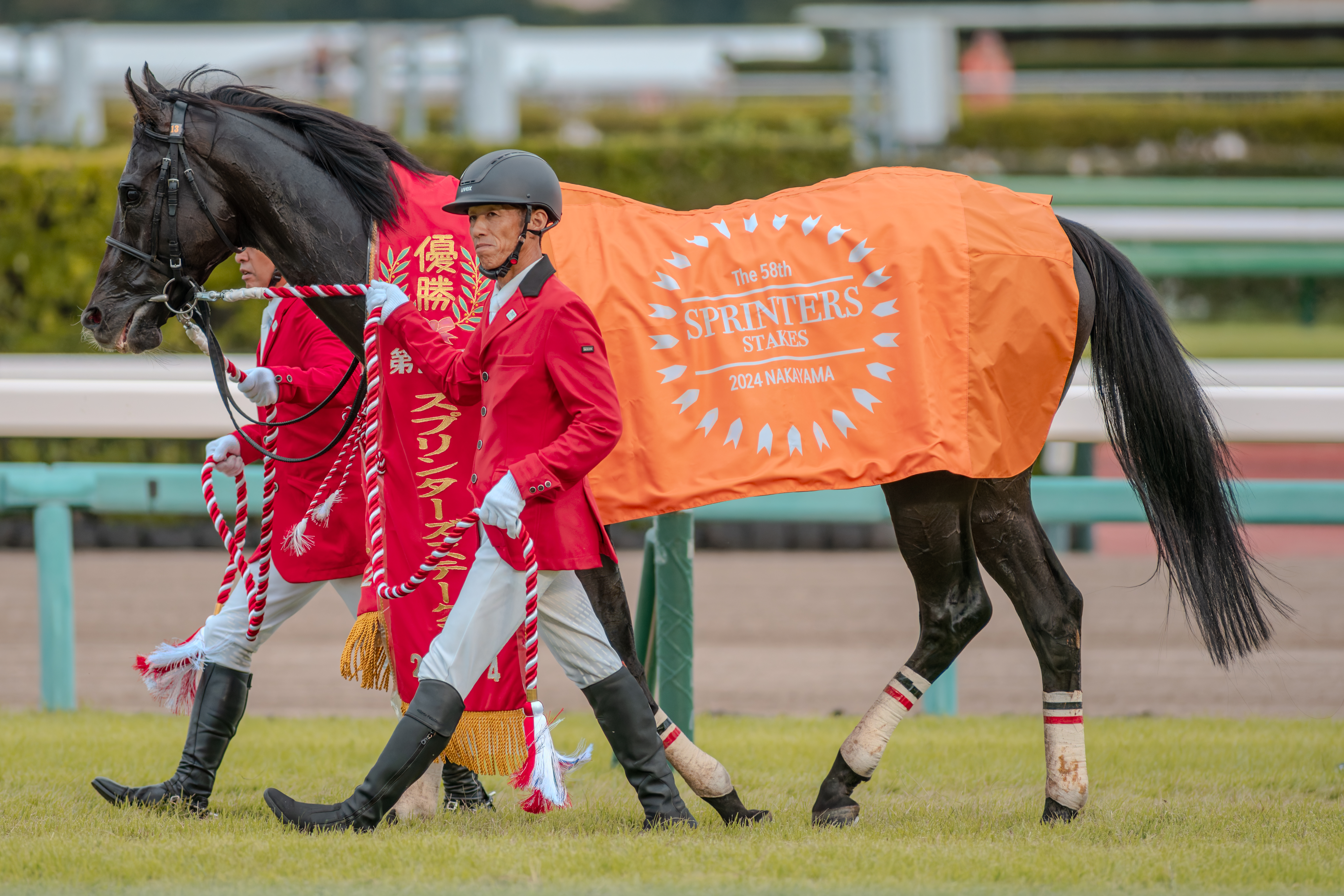
Lugal

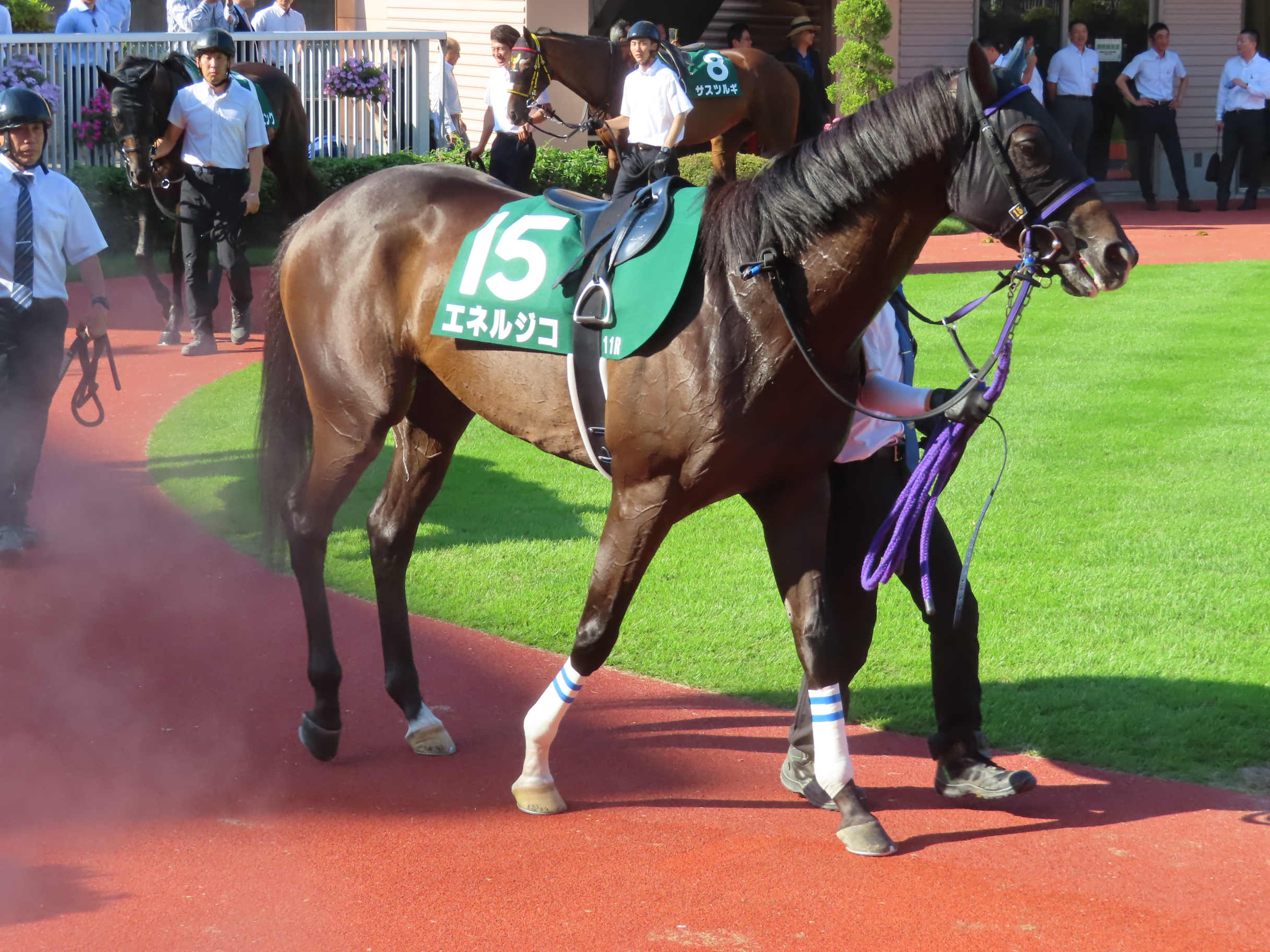
Energico

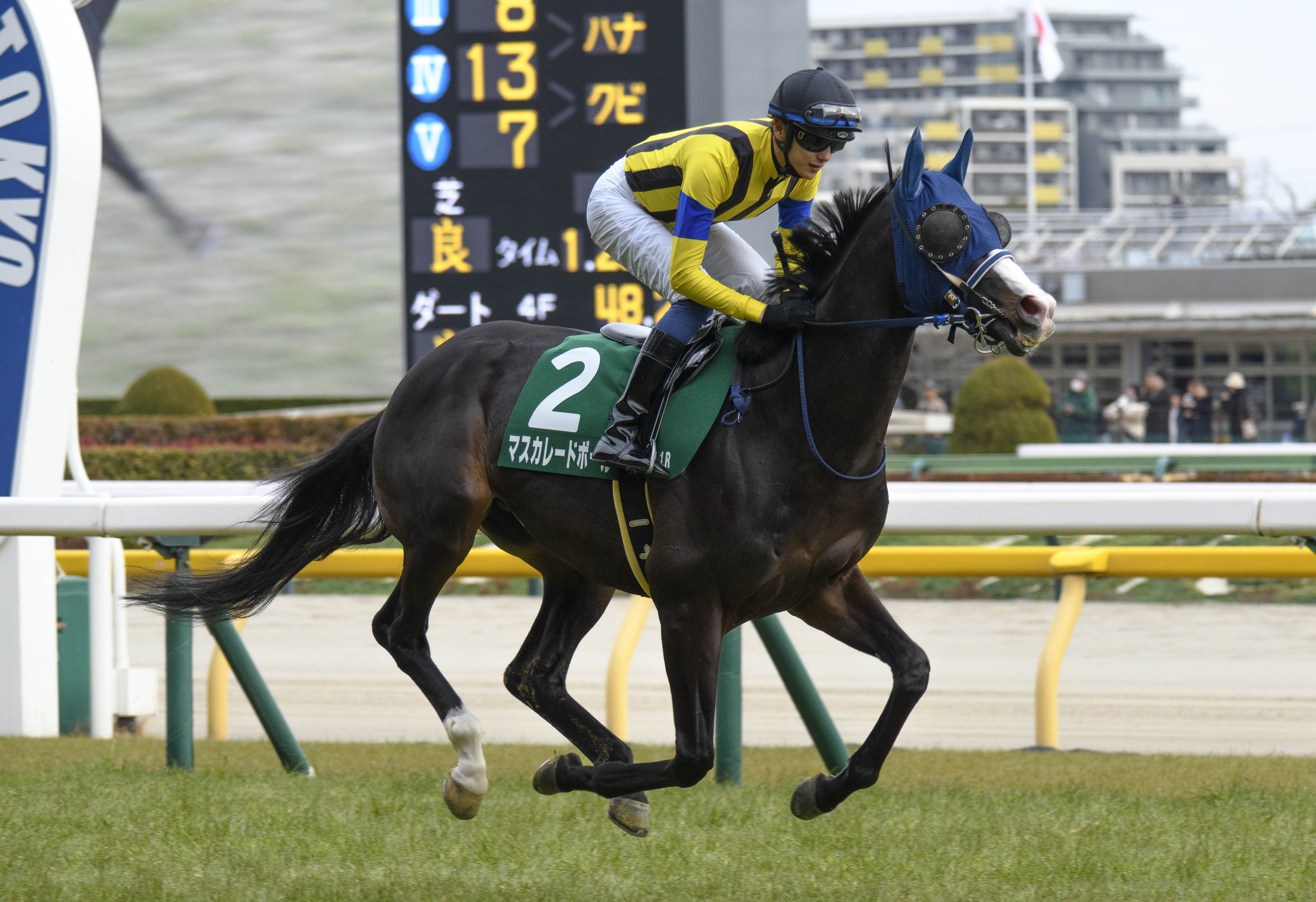
Masquerade Ball

== In popular culture ==
An anthropomorphized version of Duramente appears as a character in the Japanese multimedia franchise Umamusume: Pretty Derby, voiced by Akina. She is depicted as a dignified, austere, and authoritative girl whose dream is to become the most powerful racer in existence. She carries incredibly high expectations from the public and from her family of successful racers, and comes off as extremely ruthless and intimidating to her opponents due to her unrelenting fighting spirit during competitions. Her dedication to her dream of becoming the strongest makes her unsympathetic towards others, such as her rival Kitasan Black during the third season of the anime series. However, after she is forced to retire after an injury following the Takarazuka Kinen, she gradually comes to respect her abilities.

== Racing form ==
Duramente won five races and got four second place in nine starts. The data available is based on JBIS and netkeiba.com.

| Date | Race | Grade | Distance | Surface | Track | Entry | Finish | Time | Margin | Jockey | Winner (Runner-up) |
|---|---|---|---|---|---|---|---|---|---|---|---|
2014 – two-year-old season
| Oct 12 | 2YO Debut | | 1800m | Turf | Tokyo | 11 | 2nd | 1:48.9 | 0.1 | Fran Berry | Love Your Man |
| Nov 08 | 2YO Maiden | | 1800m | Turf | Tokyo | 14 | 1st | 1:47.5 | -1.0 | Ryan Moore | (Shonan Harukasu) |
2015 – three-year-old season
| Feb 01 | Saintpaulia Sho | ALW (1W) | 1800m | Turf | Tokyo | 14 | 1st | 1:46.9 | -0.9 | Shu Ishibashi | (Well Bred) |
| Feb 15 | Kyodo Tsushin Hai | G3 | 1800m | Turf | Tokyo | 12 | 2nd | 1:47.2 | 0.1 | Shu Ishibashi | Real Steel |
| Apr 19 | Satsuki Sho | G1 | 2000m | Turf | Nakayama | 15 | 1st | 1:58.2 | -0.2 | Mirco Demuro | (Real Steel) |
| May 31 | Tokyo Yushun | G1 | 2400m | Turf | Tokyo | 18 | 1st | R2:23.2 | -0.3 | Mirco Demuro | (Satono Rasen) |
2016 – four-year-old season
| Feb 28 | Nakayama Kinen | G2 | 1800m | Turf | Nakayama | 11 | 1st | 1:45.9 | 0.0 | Mirco Demuro | (Ambitious) |
| Mar 26 | Dubai Sheema Classic | G1 | 2410m | Turf | Meydan | 9 | 2nd | – | – | Mirco Demuro | Postponed |
| Jun 26 | Takarazuka Kinen | G1 | 2200m | Turf | Hanshin | 17 | 2nd | 2:12.8 | 0.0 | Mirco Demuro | Marialite |

Legend:
*R indicated that it was a record finish time.

== Pedigree ==
Pedigree of Duramente (JPN), bay horse, 2012
| Sire King Kamehameha (JPN) 2001 | Kingmambo (USA); 1990 | Mr. Prospector | Raise a Native |
| Sire King Kamehameha (JPN) 2001 | Kingmambo (USA); 1990 | Mr. Prospector | Gold Digger |
| Sire King Kamehameha (JPN) 2001 | Kingmambo (USA); 1990 | Miesque | Nureyev |
| Sire King Kamehameha (JPN) 2001 | Kingmambo (USA); 1990 | Miesque | Pasadoble |
| Sire King Kamehameha (JPN) 2001 | Manfath (IRE); 1991 | Last Tycoon | Try My Best |
| Sire King Kamehameha (JPN) 2001 | Manfath (IRE); 1991 | Last Tycoon | Mill Princess |
| Sire King Kamehameha (JPN) 2001 | Manfath (IRE); 1991 | Pilot Bird | Blakeney |
| Sire King Kamehameha (JPN) 2001 | Manfath (IRE); 1991 | Pilot Bird | The Dancer |
| Dam Admire Groove (JPN) 2000 | Sunday Silence (USA); 1986 | Halo | Hail To Reason |
| Dam Admire Groove (JPN) 2000 | Sunday Silence (USA); 1986 | Halo | Cosmah |
| Dam Admire Groove (JPN) 2000 | Sunday Silence (USA); 1986 | Wishing Well | Understanding |
| Dam Admire Groove (JPN) 2000 | Sunday Silence (USA); 1986 | Wishing Well | Mountain Flower |
| Dam Admire Groove (JPN) 2000 | Air Groove (JPN); 1993 | Tony Bin | Kampala |
| Dam Admire Groove (JPN) 2000 | Air Groove (JPN); 1993 | Tony Bin | Severn Bridge |
| Dam Admire Groove (JPN) 2000 | Air Groove (JPN); 1993 | Dyna Carle | Northern Taste |
| Dam Admire Groove (JPN) 2000 | Air Groove (JPN); 1993 | Dyna Carle | Shadai Feather (family: 8-f) |
