= Rulership (horse) =

Japanese-bred Thoroughbred racehorse

Rulership ルーラーシップ
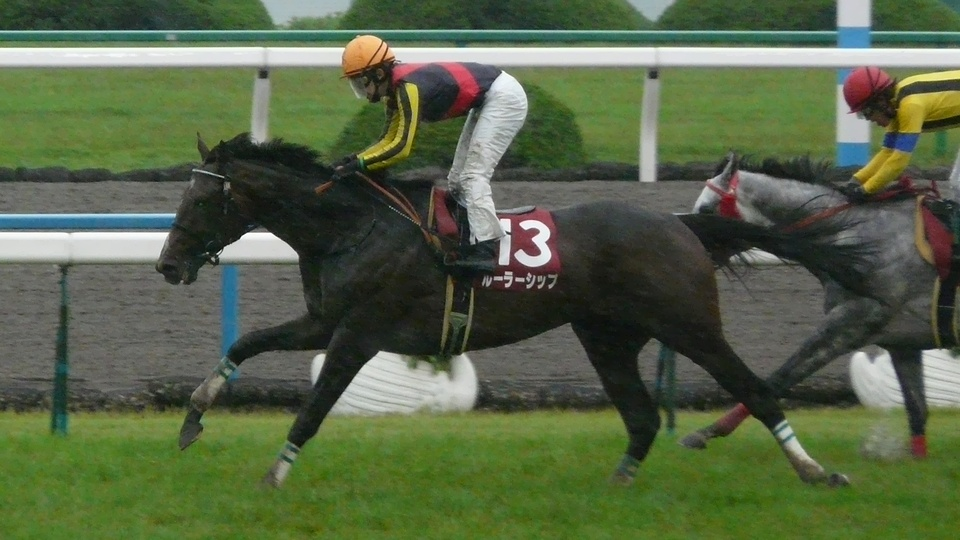
- Rulership racing at the 2011 Kinko Sho.
- Breed: Thoroughbred
- Sire: King Kamehameha (JPN)
- Grandsire: Kingmambo (USA)
- Dam: Air Groove (JPN)
- Damsire: Tony Bin (IRE)
- Sex: Stallion
- Foaled: May 15, 2007 (age 19)
- Country: Japan
- Color: Bay
- Breeder: Northern Farm
- Owner: Sunday Racing Co. Ltd.
- Racing colors
- Trainer: Katsuhiko Sumii
- Jockey: Umberto Rispoli
- Record: 20: 8-2-4
- Earnings: ¥637,455,300; JPN: ¥549,764,000; HK: HK$7,980,000

Major wins
- Naruo Kinen (2010); Nikkei Shinshun Hai (2011); Kinko Sho (2011); American Jockey Club Cup (2012); Queen Elizabeth II Cup (2012)

Rulership (Japanese: ルーラーシップ, Hepburn: Rūrāshippu; foaled May 15, 2007) is a retired Japanese Thoroughbred racehorse and sire best known for his victories in the 2012 Queen Elizabeth II Cup, American Jockey Club Cup, 2010 Naruo Kinen, 2011 Nikkei Shinshun Hai, and Kinko Sho.

== Background ==
Rulership was born to the legendary mare Air Groove, by Tony Bin, who won the 1996 Yushun Himba (Japanese Oaks) and 1997 Tenno Sho (Autumn), earning her the 1997 Japanese Horse of the Year title. As a broodmare, her first foal was Admire Groove, by Sunday Silence, winner of the Queen Elizabeth II Cup. Rulership, her second foal, sired by King Kamehameha, the 2004 Tōkyō Yūshun (Japanese Derby) winner, was highly anticipated due to his elite bloodline.

Owned by Sunday Racing Co., Ltd., he was syndicated for ¥180 million (¥4.5 million × 40 shares). At nine months old, he weighed 470 kg. He began training at Northern Farm in August 2008 but developed swelling in his right hind hock in February 2009.

== Racing career ==
=== 2009: two-year-old season ===
Rulership debuted on December 27, 2009, in a 2-year-old maiden race at Hanshin Racecourse over 2000 meters of turf under jockey Yasunari Iwata. Starting as the favorite, he won by three and a half lengths over the runner-up.

=== 2010: three-year-old season ===
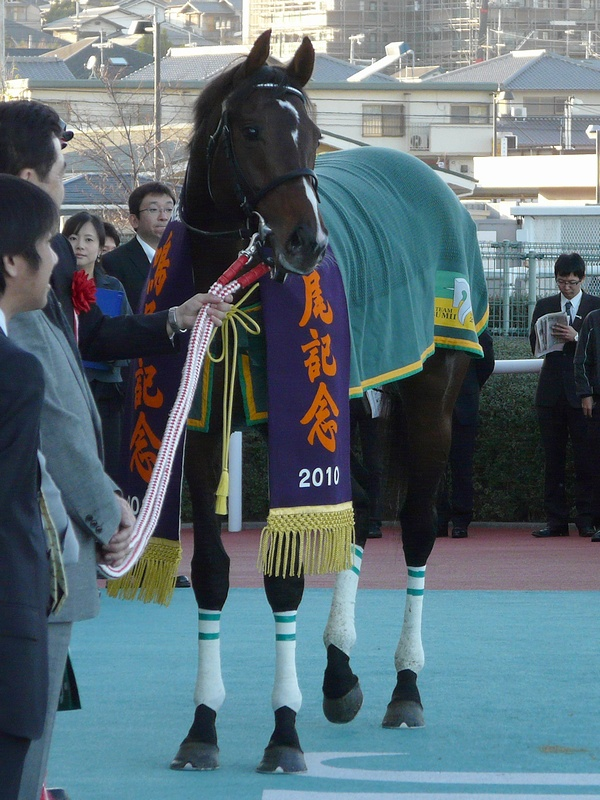
2010 Naruo Kinen

He opened 2010 as the favorite in the Wakagoma Stakes on January 23. Despite a troubled stretch run, he lost by one and a half lengths to Hiruno d'Amour, finishing second.

Planned starts in the Saintpaulia Sho and Sumire Stakes were canceled due to fever and phlegmon, respectively. He instead contested the Armeria Sho on March 7 as the favorite. Despite interference from Tamuro Sky, who veered inward in the stretch, he rallied to win by one and a half lengths. In the Mainichi Hai, a poor start and a neighboring horse’s breakdown led to a fifth place finish behind Danon Chantilly, dashing his Satsuki Shō (Japanese 2000 Guineas) aspirations.

After a brief break, he returned in the Principal Stakes on May 8 with jockey Norihiro Yokoyama, substituting for Iwata. Closing with a field-fastest final 600m in 33.7 seconds, he won by four lengths, earning a Tokyo Yushun (Japanese Derby) entry. In the Tokyo Yushun, ridden by Hirofumi Shii, he tracked mid-pack in a good position but lost momentum after being cut off in front by Gestalt, finishing fifth behind Eishin Flash.

He returned to race in the Naruo Kinen on December 4, under Iwata, defeating Hiruno d'Amour by half a length for his first group win. He concluded the year with a 6th-place finish in the Arima Kinen under Christophe Lemaire on December 26.

=== 2011: four-year-old season ===
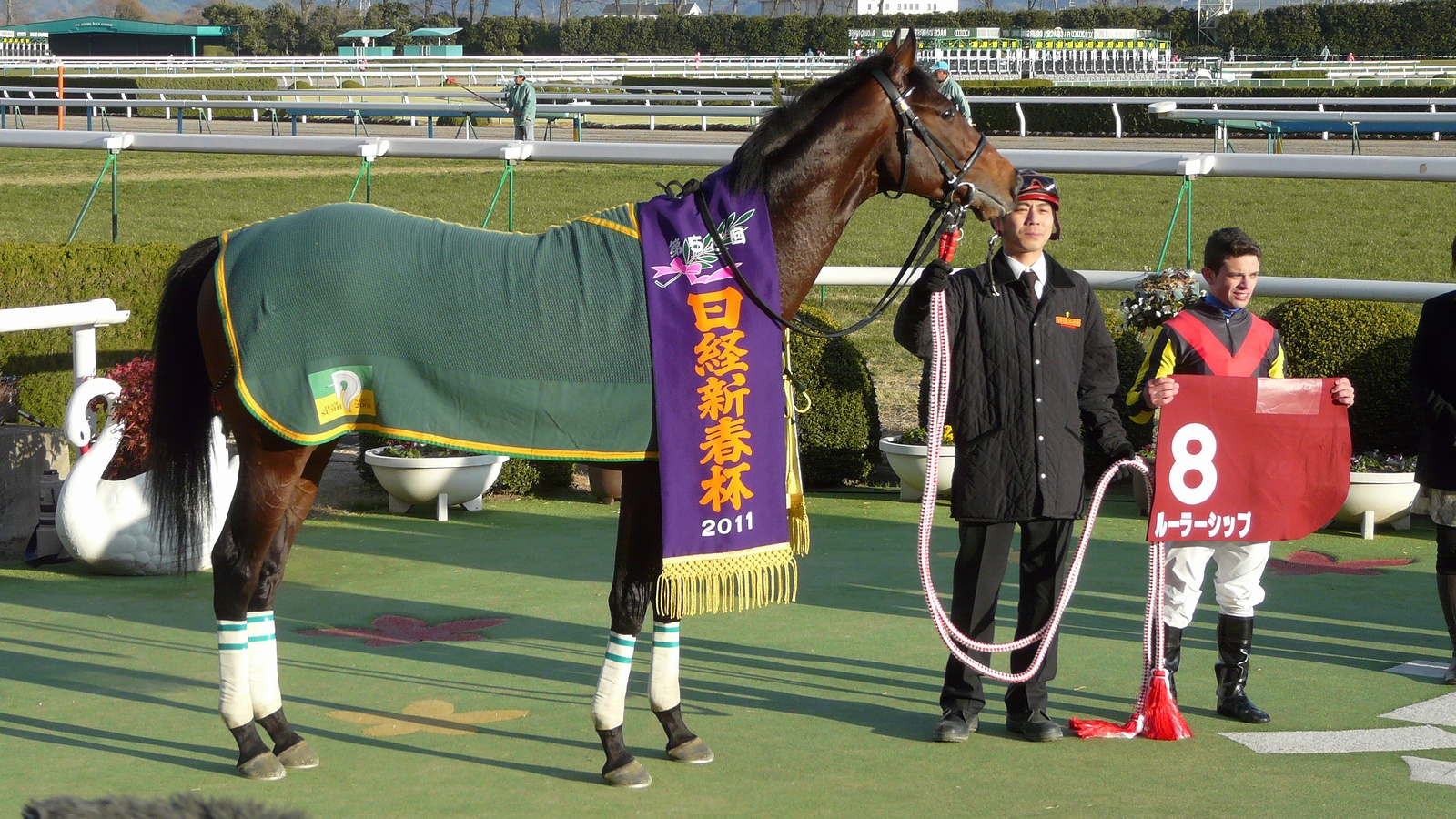
2011 Nikkei Shinshun Hai

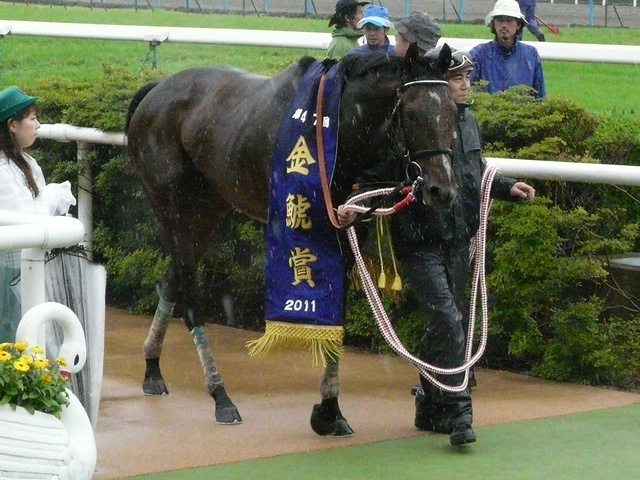
2011 Kinko Sho

Rulership’s 2011 campaign began with the Nikkei Shinshun Hai on January 16, ridden by Umberto Rispoli. Despite initial plans to skip the race, he dominated as the second favorite, defeating Rose Kingdom and Hiruno d'Amour by two lengths for his second group title.

In the Dubai Sheema Classic with Christophe Soumillon, he broke off to a good start positioned up front early but faded to 6th in the final straight. Returning to Japan, he won the Kinko Sho on May 28 under Yuichi Fukunaga, overcoming a slow start to catch Captain Thule in the stretch.

In the Takarazuka Kinen on June 26, ridden by Norihiro Yokoyama, he started as the second favorite. In the race, he closed from the rear but lacked his usual acceleration, finishing 5th. Skipping the Tenno Sho (Autumn) due to hoof issues, he ended the year with a 4th-place finish in the Arima Kinen under Ioritz Mendizabal, clocking the fastest final 600m in 33.2 seconds.

=== 2012: five-year-old season ===
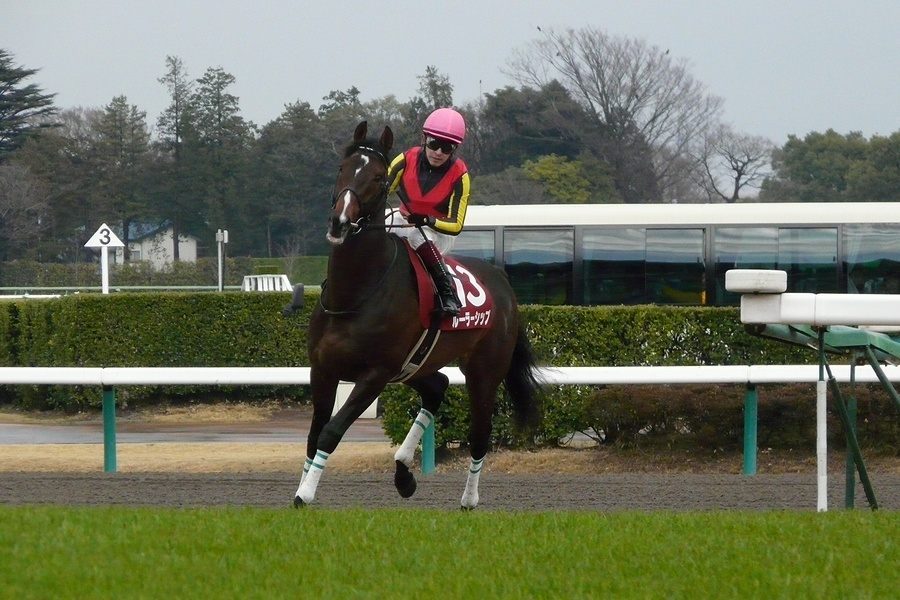
2012 Nikkei Sho

Rulership started his five-year-old season in the American Jockey Club Cup on January 22 under Yuichi Fukunaga. Rallying from the rear, he won by three lengths over Nakayama Knight for his fourth graded stakes title. In the Nikkei Sho on March 24, he finished 3rd behind Neko Punch, who led wire-to-wire.

On April 29, he triumphed in the Queen Elizabeth II Cup in Sha Tin Racecourse, Hong Kong. Tracking third early, he drew clear in the stretch to win by 3.75 lengths over Thumbs Up, securing his first group one title. The race featured elite rivals, including Mehl-Mülhens-Rennen (German 2000 Guineas) winner Irian and Irish Derby winner Treasure Beach, who was trained by Aidan O'Brien. His strong performance was praised not only in Hong Kong but also in Europe.

In the Takarazuka Kinen on June 24 under Craig Williams, he closed from mid-pack but lost by two lengths to Orfevre. In the Tenno Sho (Autumn) on October 28, he rallied with a field-fastest final 600m (33.1 seconds) but finished 3rd behind Eishin Flash.

In the Japan Cup on November 25, despite a slow start and a blistering final 600m (32.7 seconds), he finished 3rd behind Gentildonna and Orfevre. His final start, the Arima Kinen on December 23, was marred by a 10-length delay at the gate after he stood up in the gate. Rallying from last, he managed to catch up with the pack, finishing 3rd behind Gold Ship and Ocean Blue. This was his third consecutive third-place finish.

Rulership retired on December 26, 2012, to stud at Shadai Stallion Station.

== Stud record ==
His first crop in 2013 included 208 mares. Notable progeny include Ibuki who was his first winner in 2016 and Kiseki who won the 2017 Kikuka-shō, his first group one winner. He ranked 12th in 2017, 8th in 2018, and 5th in 2019 on the JRA Leading Sire list.

=== Notable progeny ===
Below data is based on JBIS Stallion Reports.

c = colt, f = filly
bold = grade 1 stakes

**Foaled**	**Name**	**Sex**	**Major Wins**
2014	Kiseki	c	**Kikuka-shō**
2015	Mer de Glace	c	Niigata Daishoten, Naruo Kinen, Kokura Kinen, **Caulfield Cup**
2018	Soul Rush	c	Yomiuri Milers Cup (2022, 2024), Keisei Hai Autumn Handicap, **Mile Championship**, **Dubai Turf**
2020	Dolce More	c	Saudi Arabia Royal Cup, **Asahi Hai Futurity Stakes**
2021	Redentor	c	Diamond Stakes, **Tenno Sho (Spring)**
2014	Danburite	c	American Jockey Club Cup, Kyōto Kinen
2014	My Blue Heaven	c	Niigata Jump Stakes
2014	Muito Obrigado	c	Copa Republica Argentina
2014	A Shin Click	c	Hanshin Spring Jump
2015	Tetradrachm	f	Queen Cup
2015	Grandiose	c	Diamond Stakes
2016	Lion Lion	c	Aoba Sho, St Lite Kinen
2016	Dirndl	f	Aoi Stakes, Fukushima Himba Stakes
2016	Passing Through	f	Shion Stakes
2016	Fairy Polka	f	Nakayama Himba Stakes, Fukushima Himba Stakes
2017	Echt	c	Tanabata Sho, Kokura Kinen
2018	Wonderful Town	c	Kyoto Nisai Stakes, Aoba Sho
2018	Ho O Ixelles	f	Flower Cup
2018	Big Ribbon	f	Mermaid Stakes
2020	Hrimfaxi	c	Kisaragi Sho
2020	Masked Diva	f	Rose Stakes, Hanshin Himba Stakes
2020	Smile Through	c	Kyoto Jump Stakes (2025, 2026), Kokura Jump Stakes
2021	Di Speranza	c	Arlington Cup
2021	Hohelied	f	Stayers Stakes

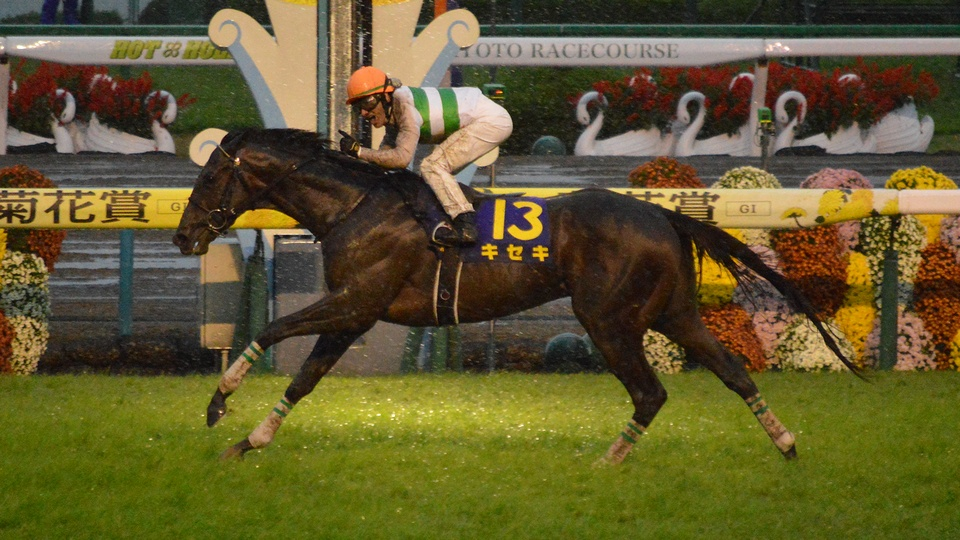
Kiseki

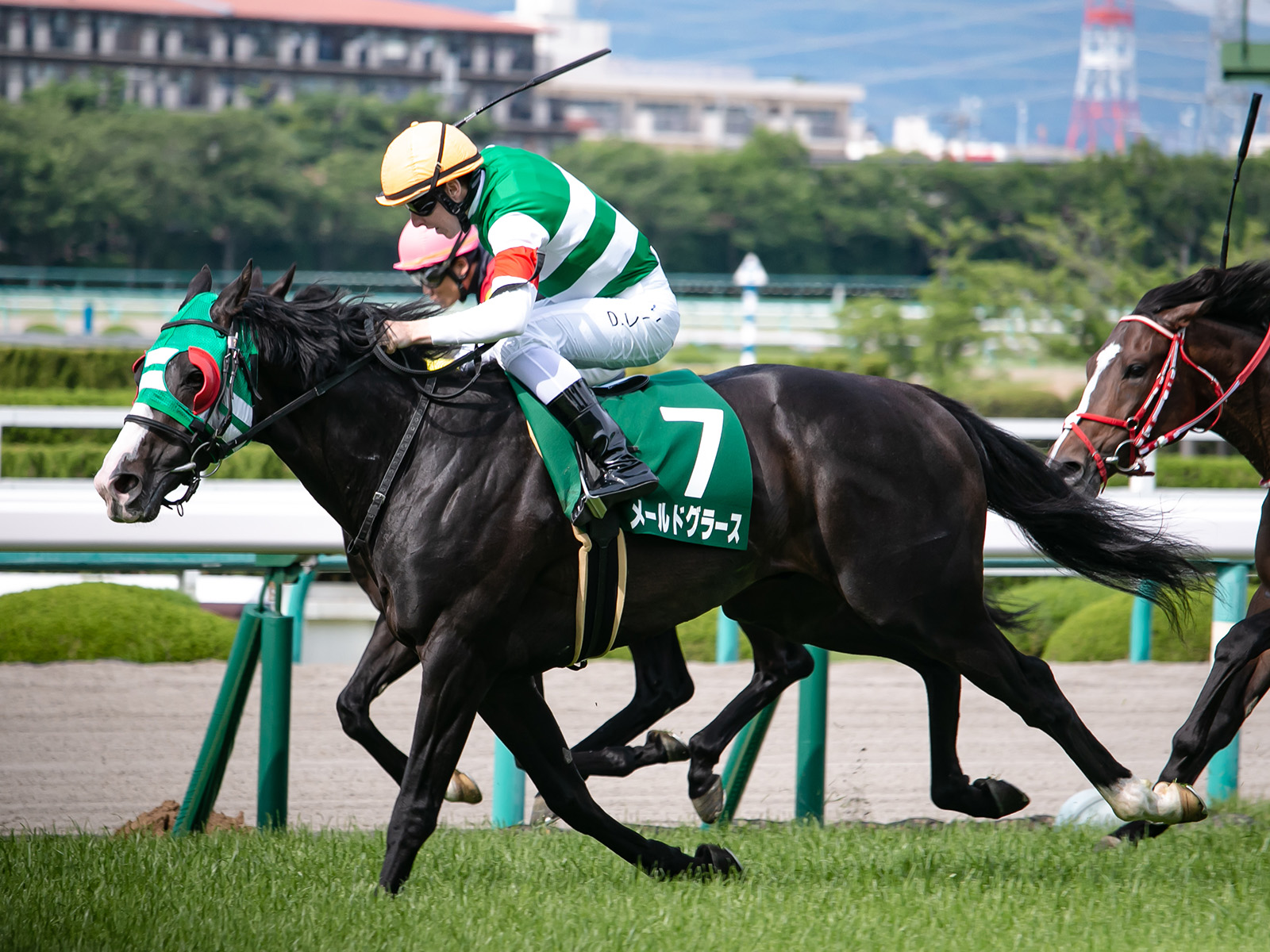
Mer de Glace

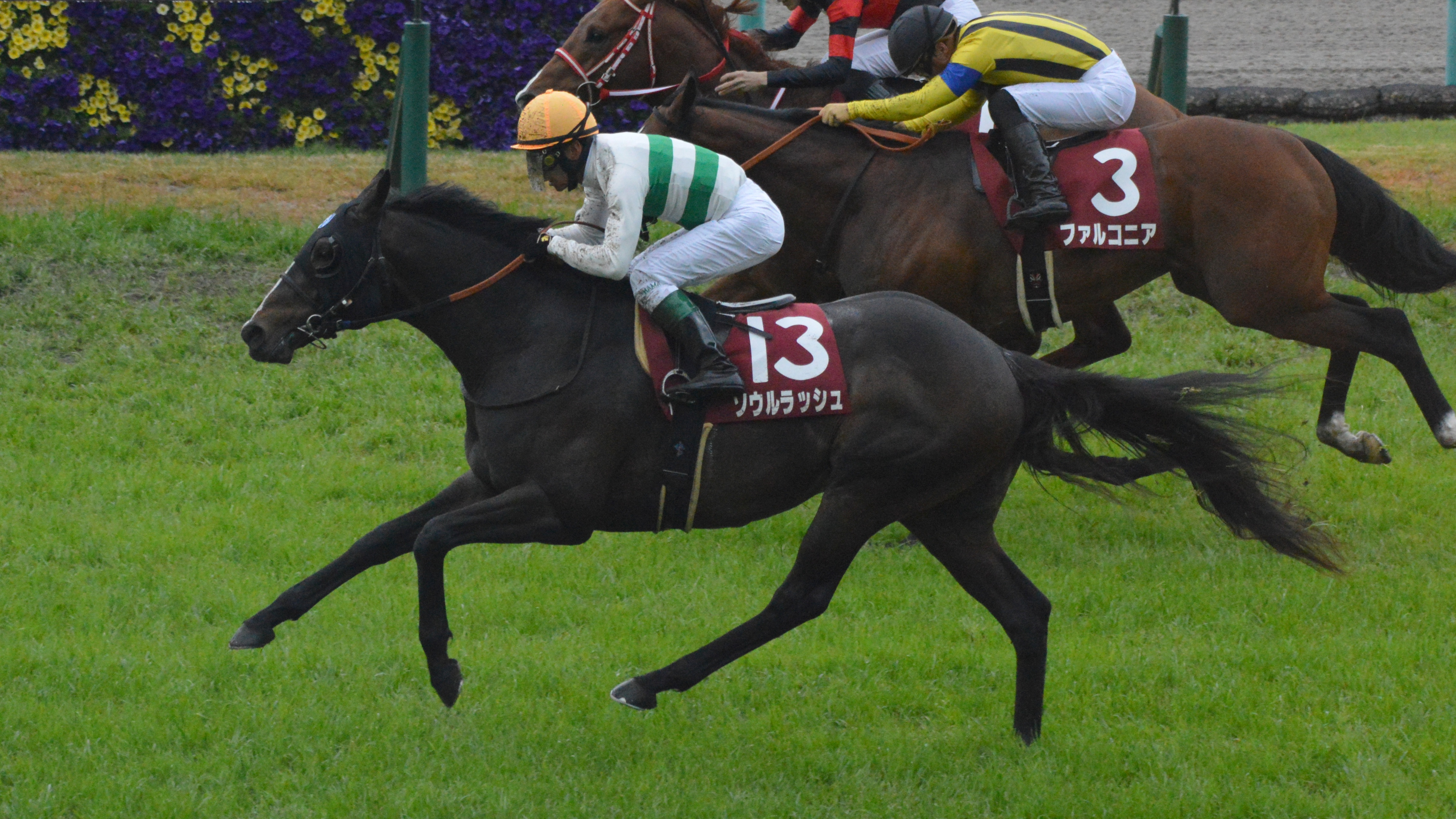
Soul Rush

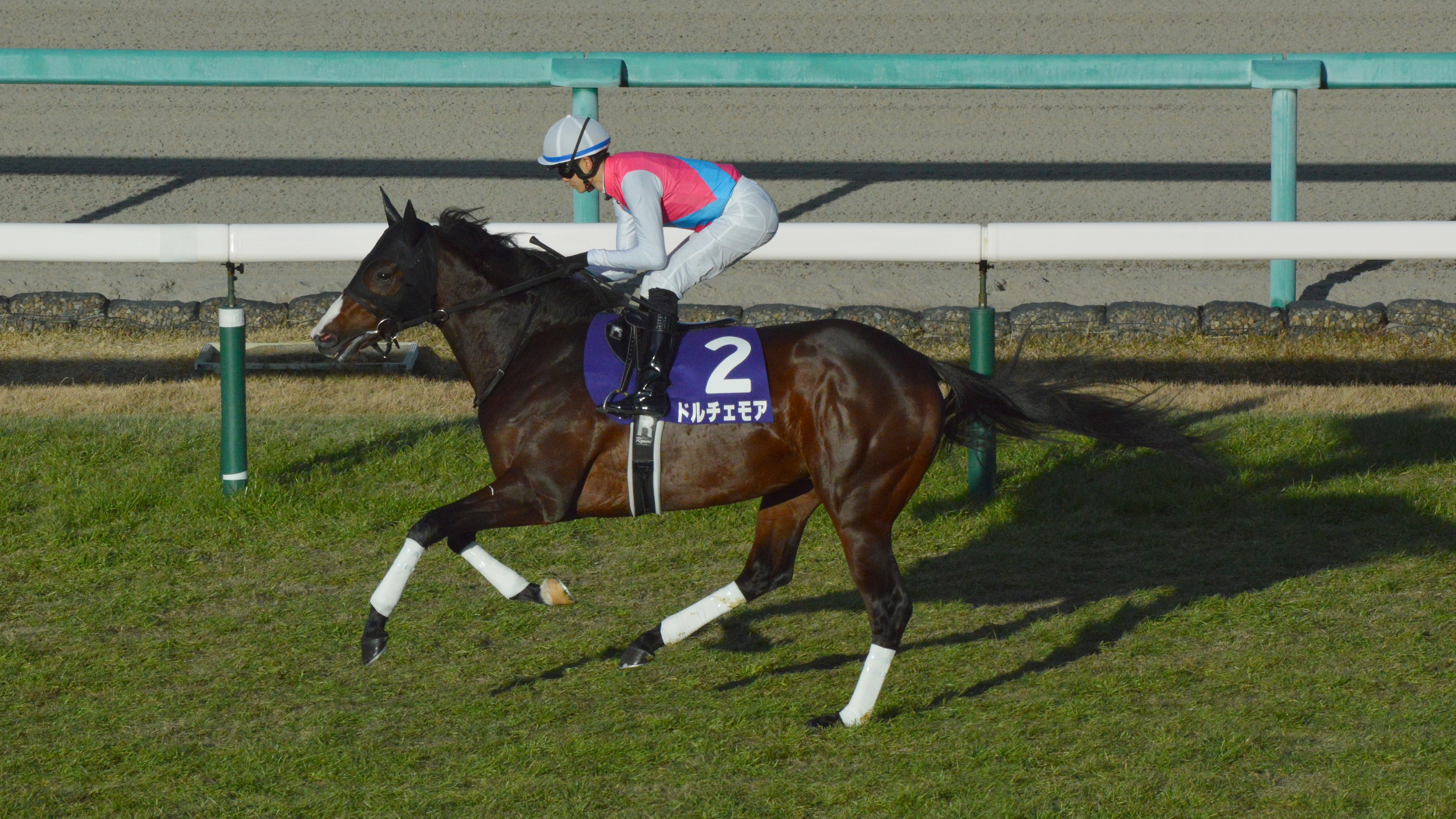
Dolce More

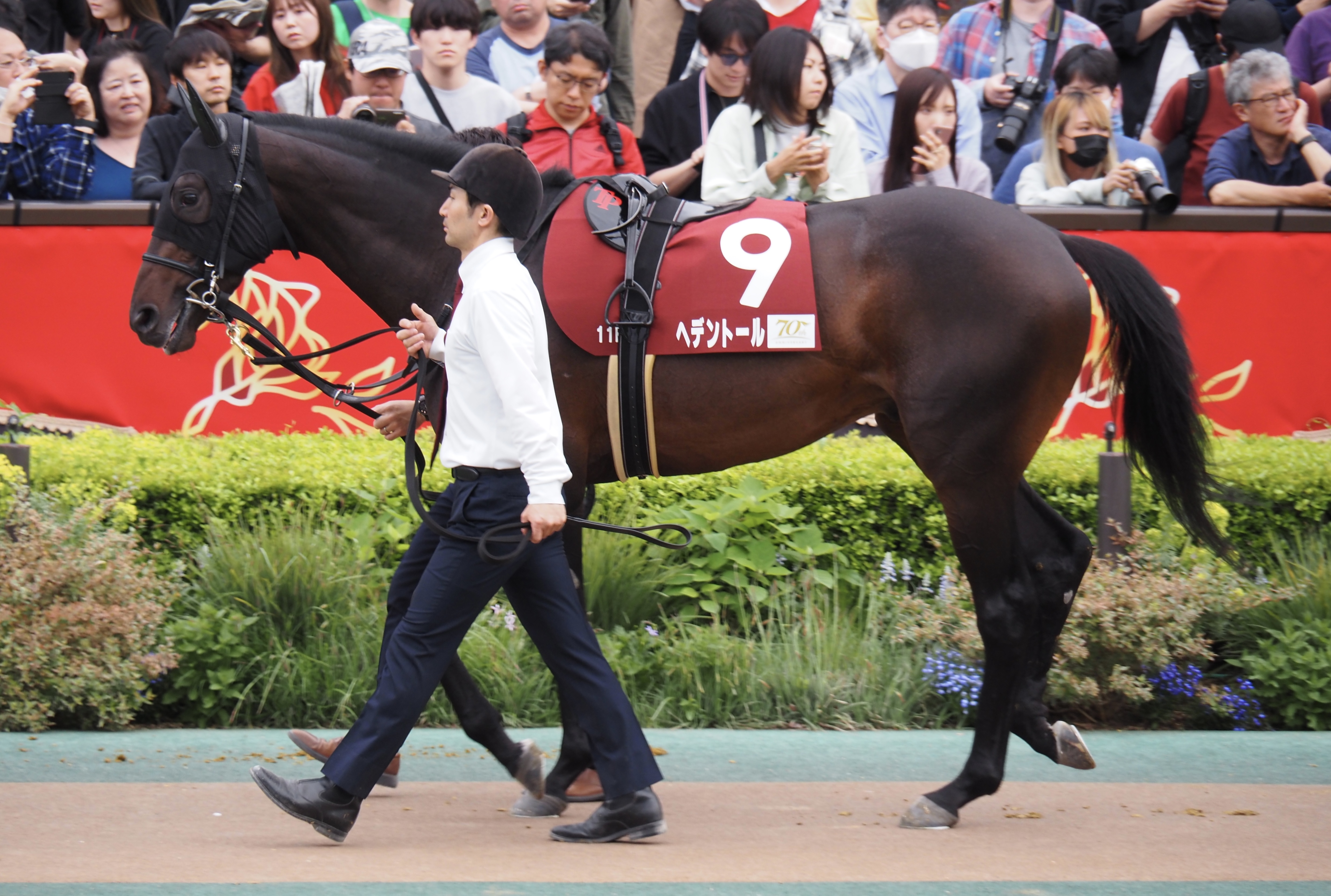
Redentor

== In popular culture ==
An anthropomorphized version of Rulership appears as a character in the Japanese multimedia franchise Umamusume: Pretty Derby, voiced by Mizutama Umino. She is depicted as a girl who loves games, with a particular enthusiasm for board and tabletop games such as reversi, and exhibits remarkable strategic skills which she applies to racing. However, her bravado hides a fragile ego, leading her to handling situations that go out of her control as well as losing very poorly. She feels great shame and embarrassment after a loss that often causes her to become a hikikomori, locking herself in her dormitory room or a disused clubhouse that she uses as a hideout before sulking for days. Her friend and senior Air Groove is aware of Rulership's fragile ego and is somewhat softer in treatment towards her compared to others, but also sometimes forcibly drags her out of her hiding places to train.

== Racing statistics ==
Below data is based on data available on JBIS Search, NetKeiba, and Hong Kong Jockey Club.

Date	Age	Track	Race	Grade	Distance (Condition)	Entry	HN	Odds (Favored)	Finish	Time	Margins	Jockey	Winner (Runner-up)
Dec 27, 2009	2	Hanshin	2YO Debut		2,000 m (Firm)	11	1	1.5 (1)	1st	2:04.7	-0.6	Yasunari Iwata	(Eifer Ryan)
Jan 23, 2010	3	Kyoto	Wakagoma Stakes	OP	2,000 m (Firm)	10	2	1.7 (1)	2nd	2:02.2	0.2	Yasunari Iwata	Hiruno d'Amour
Mar 7, 2010	3	Hanshin	Armeria Sho	OP	1,800 m (Good)	14	14	1.4 (1)	1st	1:51.2	-0.4	Yasunari Iwata	(Miyaji Shenlong)
Mar 27, 2010	3	Hanshin	Mainichi Hai	GIII	1,800 m (Firm)	11	2	2.2 (1)	5th	1:49.8	0.5	Yasunari Iwata	Danon Chantilly
May 8, 2010	3	Tokyo	Principal Stakes	OP	2,000 m (Firm)	18	5	1.9 (1)	1st	1:59.1	-0.7	Norihiro Yokoyama	(Quark Star)
May 30, 2010	3	Tokyo	Tōkyō Yūshun	GI	2,400 m (Firm)	17	3	14.5 (4)	5th	2:27.2	0.3	Hirofumi Shii	Eishin Flash
Dec 4, 2010	3	Hanshin	Naruo Kinen	GIII	1,800 m (Firm)	12	11	3.9 (2)	1st	1:44.9	-0.1	Yasunari Iwata	(Hiruno d'Amour)
Dec 26, 2010	3	Nakayama	Arima Kinen	GI	2,500 m (Firm)	15	5	17.6 (6)	6th	2:33.0	0.4	Christophe Lemaire	Victoire Pisa
Jan 16, 2011	4	Kyoto	Nikkei Shinshun Hai	GII	2,400 m (Firm)	13	8	3.2 (2)	1st	2:24.6	-0.3	Umberto Rispoli	(Hiruno d'Amour)
Mar 26, 2011	4	Meydan	Dubai Sheema Classic	G1	2,410 m (Good)	14	10	N/A	6th	N/A	N/A	Christophe Soumillon	Rewilding
May 28, 2011	4	Kyoto	Kinko Sho	GII	2,000 m (Soft)	16	13	2.8 (1)	1st	2:02.4	-0.1	Yuichi Fukunaga	(Captain Thule)
Jun 26, 2011	4	Hanshin	Takarazuka Kinen	GI	2,200 m (Firm)	16	3	3.7 (2)	5th	2:11.0	0.9	Norihiro Yokoyama	Earnestly
Dec 25, 2011	4	Nakayama	Arima Kinen	GI	2,500 m (Firm)	13	14	52.9 (11)	4th	2:36.2	0.2	Ioritz Mendizabal	Orfevre
Jan 22, 2012	5	Nakayama	AJCC	GII	2,200 m (Soft)	11	3	1.4 (1)	1st	2:17.3	-0.5	Yuichi Fukunaga	(Nakayama Knight)
Mar 24, 2012	5	Nakayama	Nikkei Sho	GII	2,500 m (Yielding)	14	13	1.4 (1)	3rd	2:38.1	0.7	Yuichi Fukunaga	Neko Punch
Apr 29, 2012	5	Sha Tin	QE2 Cup	G1	2,000 m (GY)	13	4	5.5 (2)	1st	2:02.38	-0.60	Umberto Rispoli	(Thumbs Up)
Jun 24, 2012	5	Hanshin	Takarazuka Kinen	GI	2,200 m (Firm)	16	7	4.4 (2)	2nd	2:11.2	0.3	Craig Williams	Orfevre
Oct 28, 2012	5	Tokyo	Tenno Sho (Autumn)	GI	2,000 m (Firm)	18	6	4.5 (2)	3rd	1:57.6	0.3	Ioritz Mendizabal	Eishin Flash
Nov 25, 2012	5	Tokyo	Japan Cup	GI	2,400 m (Firm)	17	13	5.4 (2)	3rd	2:23.5	0.4	Craig Williams	Gentildonna
Dec 23, 2012	5	Nakayama	Arima Kinen	GI	2,500 m (Firm)	16	9	3.7 (2)	3rd	2:32.2	0.3	Craig Williams	Gold Ship

Legend:
Turf

== Pedigree ==
Pedigree of Rulership (JPN), bay colt, 2007
Sire King Kamehameha b. 2001	Kingmambo (USA) b. 1990	Mr. Prospector	Raise a Native
Sire King Kamehameha b. 2001	Kingmambo (USA) b. 1990	Mr. Prospector	Gold Digger
Sire King Kamehameha b. 2001	Kingmambo (USA) b. 1990	Miesque	Nureyev
Sire King Kamehameha b. 2001	Kingmambo (USA) b. 1990	Miesque	Pasadoble
Sire King Kamehameha b. 2001	Manfath (IRE) dk.b. 1991	Last Tycoon	Try My Best (USA)
Sire King Kamehameha b. 2001	Manfath (IRE) dk.b. 1991	Last Tycoon	Mill Princess
Sire King Kamehameha b. 2001	Manfath (IRE) dk.b. 1991	Pilot Bird (GB)	Blakeney
Sire King Kamehameha b. 2001	Manfath (IRE) dk.b. 1991	Pilot Bird (GB)	The Dancer (FR)
Dam Air Groove b. 1993	Tony Bin (IRE) b. 1983	Kampala (GB)	Kalamoun
Dam Air Groove b. 1993	Tony Bin (IRE) b. 1983	Kampala (GB)	State Pension
Dam Air Groove b. 1993	Tony Bin (IRE) b. 1983	Severn Bridge (GB)	Hornbeam
Dam Air Groove b. 1993	Tony Bin (IRE) b. 1983	Severn Bridge (GB)	Priddy Fair
Dam Air Groove b. 1993	Dyna Carle	Northern Taste (CAN)	Northern Dancer
Dam Air Groove b. 1993	Dyna Carle	Northern Taste (CAN)	Lady Victoria
Dam Air Groove b. 1993	Dyna Carle	Shadai Feather	Guersant (FR)
Dam Air Groove b. 1993	Dyna Carle	Shadai Feather	Peroxide (GB) (Family: 8-f)

- His dam Air Groove won the 1996 Yushun Himba and 1997 Tenno Sho (Autumn). Granddam Dyna Carle also won the Yushun Himba.
- His half-sister Admire Groove by Sunday Silence won the 2003 Queen Elizabeth II Cup.
- His half-brother Forgettable by Dance in the Dark won the 2009 Stayers Stakes and the 2010 Diamond Stakes.
- His half-sister Gullveig by Deep Impact won the 2012 Mermaid Stakes.
