= Air Groove =

Japanese thoroughbred racehorse (1993-2013)

Air Groove エアグルーヴ
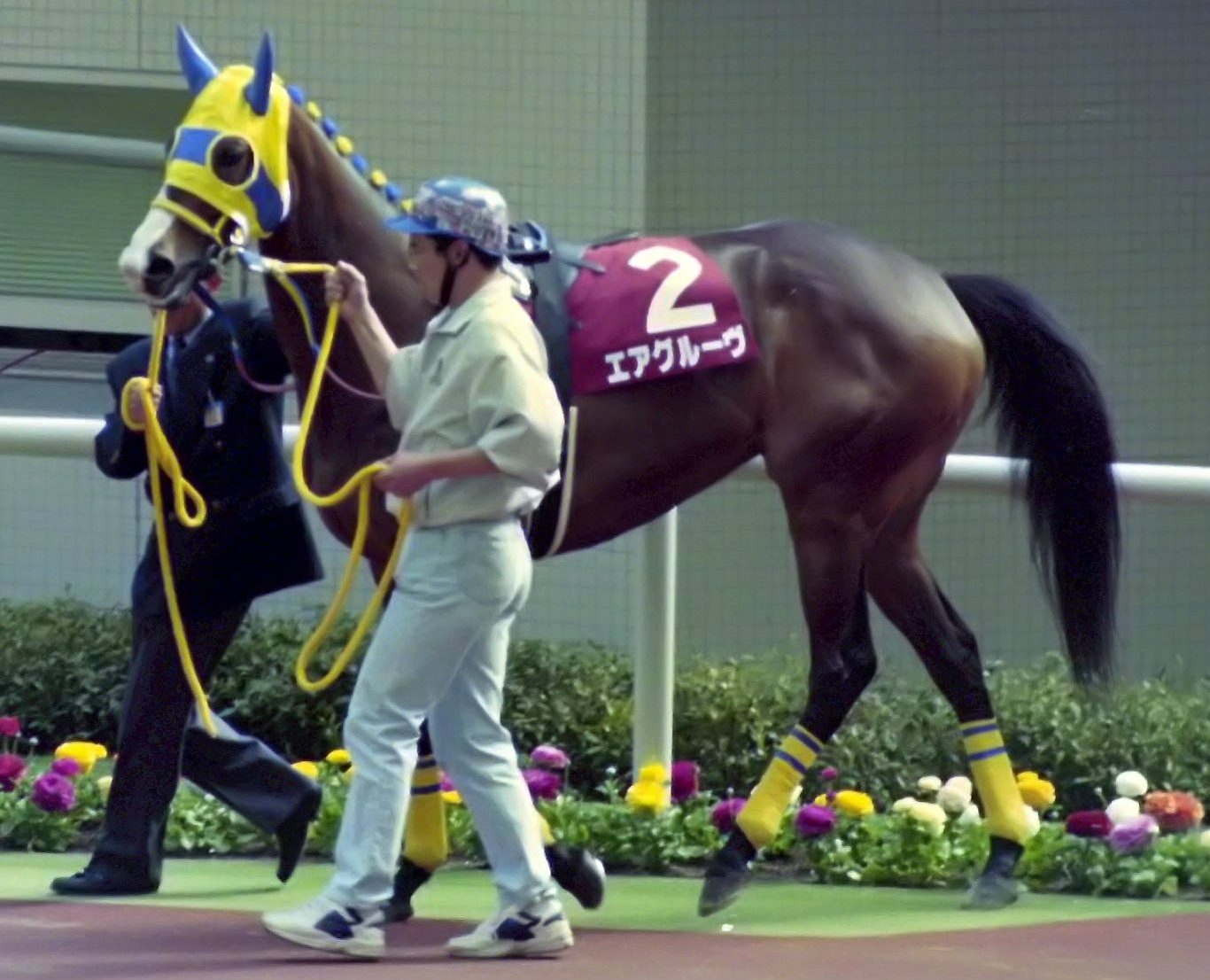
- Air Groove at the paddock of the 1998 Sankei Ōsaka Hai.
- Breed: Thoroughbred
- Sire: Tony Bin (IRE)
- Grandsire: Kampala (GB)
- Dam: Dyna Carle (JPN)
- Damsire: Northern Taste (CAN)
- Sex: Mare
- Foaled: April 6, 1993
- Died: April 23, 2013 (aged 20)
- Country: Japan
- Colour: Bay
- Breeder: Shadai Farm Hayakita
- Owner: Satoshi Yoshihara
- Racing colours
- Trainer: Yuji Ito
- Jockey: Yutaka Take
- Record: 19:9-5-3
- Earnings: ¥821,966,000

Major wins
- Tenno Sho (Autumn) (1997); Sapporo Kinen (1997, 1998); Sankei Ōsaka Hai (1998); Tulip Sho (1996); Mermaid Stakes (1997); Japanese Classic Tiara Race wins: Yushun Himba (1996)

Awards
- Japanese Horse of the Year (1997); JRA Award for Best Older Filly or Mare (1997)

Air Groove (Japanese: エアグルーヴ, Hepburn: Ea Gurūvu; 6 April, 1993 - 23 April, 2013) was a Japanese Thoroughbred racehorse and broodmare.

She won the 1996 Yushun Himba (Japanese Oaks) after her mother, Dyna Carle, won it in 1983. In 1997, Air Groove won the Grade 1 Autumn Tenno Sho and became the first mare chosen for Japanese Horse of the Year in 26 years. She was nicknamed the Empress for how she competed on par with male horses. Her other wins included the 1996 Tulip Sho (G3), the 1997 Sapporo Kinen (G2) and Mermaid Stakes (Japan) (G3), and the 1998 Sapporo Kinen (G2) and Ōsaka Hai (G2).

After retirement, she became a broodmare. Her foals included two G1 winners: Admire Groove (winner of the 2003 and 2004 Queen Elizabeth II Commemorative Cup, fathered by Sunday Silence) and Rulership (winner of the 2012 Queen Elizabeth II Cup, fathered by King Kamehameha).

== Before debut ==
She was born on April 6th, 1993 at Shadai Farm Hayakita in Hayakita Town, Hokkaido. Her father, Tony Bin, was a major winner in Europe and her mother, Dyna Carle, won the Japanese Oaks. Upon her birth, the farm contacted Ito, who spent over an hour staring at her because he was impressed. According to Yutaka Take, Ito said to farm manager Katsumi Yoshida that the foal Air Groove would be a derby winning horse if she was male. Yutaka Take would become Air Groove's jockey later on.

== Racing career ==
=== 1995: two-year-old season ===
Air Groove made her debut on July 8th, 1995 over 1200m on turf. Although she was the favorite, she came in second by a neck behind Meiner Ransom. She entered her second race 3 weeks later on June 30th, 1994 again over 1200m on turf and again the favorite. This time, she won by 0.8 seconds over Daiwa Texas.

Air Groove's third race was on October 29, 1995, at the Ichō Stakes, a 1600m open race on turf. She was blocked in the final straight, putting her at a disadvantage, but she overcame this and finished in first by a large margin. Yutaka Take said about her performance that no other horse could have done what she did. Ito said, "normally you can't win from that position. That was the moment I became convinced that this was no ordinary filly, but a filly who could beat male horses."

In the Grade 1 1995 Hanshin Sansai Himba Stakes over 1600m on turf, Yutaka Take chose to ride Ibuki Persive so European jockey Michael Kinane rode Air Groove instead. The pace was slow, allowing Biwa Heidi to take the lead and win. Air Groove came in second. Kinane said that he was afraid of Biwa Heidi. He said about Air Groove that she could have won, but he didn't let her.

=== 1996: three-year-old season ===
She started off the 1996 season with a win at the 1996 Tulip Sho on March 2nd as the second favorite. Facing off against Biwa Heidi again, Air Groove entered this time with a new jockey named Olivier Peslier. This time, Air Groove won by five lengths over Biwa Heidi.

Air Groove was scheduled to run in the Oka Sho but developed a fever during training. She recovered quickly but people around her decided it was best to not for her to run as the information had already spread around. Colds were common in Ritto training center at the time; another horse, Dance in the Dark, ended up in the same position as Air Groove where he had to withdraw from the Satsuki Sho.

After a break, she entered the 1996 Yushun Himba, a 2400m race on turf for her longest race yet. In the final stretch of the race, she gained and maintained a large lead over the Oka Sho winner Fight Gulliver. She finished well in first place for her first GI win. She and her mother became the second mother-daughter pair to both win the Japanese Oaks, 42 years after the first pair to do it.

Once she won the Oaks, she took a break, skipping the step races to go straight into the turf 2000m Shuka Sho. Ito believed that they had overprepared, so she was not in good condition to run. Before the start of the race, she was startled by the flashing light from being photographed. She stayed panicked throughout the warmup laps and into the gate. During the race, she ran well but did not respond to Yutaka Take. He had to whip her around the fourth corner but she still finished in tenth place, with the winner Fabulous la Fouine finishing almost 2 seconds before her. After the race, a fracture was discovered in her front right leg which led to a long absence where she underwent surgery and returned to Ritto late in the year.

=== 1997: four-year-old season ===
She returned to the track in June, where she entered the 2000m turf GIII Mermaid Stakes as the favorite where she won. This win was the first of a three win streak. Her second win in this streak occurred at the newly classified as GII, 2000m turf Sapporo Kinen. In this race, she would be facing Genuine. Her performance against Genuine, whether she won or lost the race, would decide if she could run in the Autumn Tenno Sho. Again the favorite, Air Groove broke away from the pack and maintained her lead over Genuine and Erimo Chic, winning the race and affirming her trainer's confidence in her ability to win the Tenno Sho.

At the 1997 Grade 1 Autumn Tenno Sho over 2000m on turf, she entered as the second favorite behind Bubble Gum Fellow, who had won the race the year prior. In the final stretch, Air Groove chased him when he tried to break away. They stayed in a one-on-one until the end where Air Groove won by a neck with Bubble Gum Fellow in second. Genuine came in third, five lengths behind Bubble Gum Fellow. Air Groove became the first mare in 17 years to win the Autumn Tenno Sho and the first mare to win since it became a 2000m race.

In that year's Japan Cup, she entered as the second favorite. She ran well but was overtaken by foreign horse Pilsudski at the end and finished second by a neck. Her last race of the year was the GI 2500m Arima Kinen, where she was the second favorite accompanied

=== 1998: five-year-old season ===
Her 1998 season was also very successful, as she either won or placed on the podium at 6 of her 7 races. She started off the year with a win at the April Sankei Ōsaka Hai, and came in 2nd at the June 1998 Naruo Kinen. She came in 3rd at the July 1998 Takarazuka Kinen and got the last win of her career at the August 1998 Sapporo Kinen. Her final race of her career was on December 27, 1998, when she came in 5th at the Arima Kinen.

== Breeding career and death ==
In 1999, Air Groove became a broodmare at Northern Farm (formerly known as Shadai Farm Hayakita), her place of birth. She has produced eleven foals, including four graded stakes winners, namely Admire Groove, Rulership, Forgettable and Gullveig.

On April 23, 2013, during the same day when her last foal was born, Air Groove passed away, due to internal bleeding.

c = colt, f = filly, g = gelding

No.	Name	Foaled	Sex	Color	Sire	Wins	Races	Remarks
1st	Admire Groove	2000	f	Bay	Sunday Silence	8	21	Retired, broodmare
2nd	Into the Groove	2001	f	Bay	Sunday Silence	4	14	Retired, broodmare
3rd	Samurai Heart	2002	c	Bay	Sunday Silence	3	5	Retired, breeding stallion
4th	Sonic Groove	2003	f	Bay	French Deputy			Did not race, broodmare
5th	Thesunday Fusaichi	2004	c	Dark Bay	Dance in the Dark	3	41	Retired, breeding stallion
6th	Portofino	2005	f	Bay	Kurofune	3	9	Retired, broodmare
7th	Forgettable	2006	c	Dark Bay	Dance in the Dark	4	32	Retired
8th	Rulership	2007	c	Bay	King Kamehameha	8	20	Retired, breeding stallion
9th	Gullveig	2008	f	Dark Bay	Deep Impact	5	11	Retired, broodmare
10th	Last Groove	2010	f	Bay	Deep Impact	1	1	Retired, broodmare
	(not foaled)	2011			Deep Impact			
	(not foaled)	2012			Harbinger			
11th	Chopin	2013	g	Dark Bay	King Kamehameha	3	32	Retired, riding horse

== In popular culture ==
An anthropomorphized version of Air Groove appears as a character in the Japanese multimedia franchise Umamusume: Pretty Derby, voiced by Ruriko Aoki. She is depicted as the strict and dignified vice-president of Tracen Academy's student council known as the "Empress", infamous for her heavy-handed discipline towards unruly students out of a desire for them to improve. Her straight-laced personality contrasts with that of student council president Symboli Rudolf, whose puns and dad jokes elude her until an extended period of time has passed. Air Groove is notably softer towards her juniors Duramente, Admire Groove, and Rulership, all of whose antics exasperate her but continues to look out for regardless.

== Racing form ==
Air Groove won nine races out of 19 starts. This data is available on JBIS and netkeiba.

Date	Age	Track	Race	Grade	Distance (Condition)	Field	HN	Odds (Favorite)	Finish	Time	Margin (Seconds)	Jockey	Winner (2nd place)
Jul 8, 1995	2	Sapporo	Two Year Old Debut	Maiden	1200m (Firm)	9	4	1.6 (1)	2nd	1:12.1	0.0	Yutaka Take	Meiner Ransom
Jul 30, 1995	2	Sapporo	Two Year Old	Maiden	1200m (Good)	7	3	1.1 (1)	1st	1:12.0	-0.8	Yutaka Take	(Daiwa Texas)
Oct 29, 1995	2	Tokyo	Ichō Stakes	Open	1600m (Firm)	11	1	2.2 (1)	1st	1:35.8	-0.2	Yutaka Take	(Mountain Stone)
Dec 3, 1995	2	Hanshin	Hanshin Sansai Himba Stakes	G1	1600m (Firm)	11	9	6.0 (3)	2nd	1:35.4	0.1	Michael Kinane	Biwa Heidi
Mar 2, 1996	3	Hanshin	Tulip Sho	G3	1600m (Good)	14	5	2.7 (2)	1st	1:34.2	-0.8	Olivier Peslier	(Biwa Heidi)
May 26, 1996	3	Tokyo	Yushun Himba	G1	2400m (Firm)	18	15	2.5 (1)	1st	2:29.1	-0.2	Yutaka Take	(Fight Gulliver)
Oct 20, 1996	3	Kyoto	Shuka Sho	G1	2000m (Firm)	18	17	1.7 (1)	10th	1:59.8	1.7	Yutaka Take	Fabulous la Fouine
Jun 22, 1997	4	Hanshin	Mermaid Stakes	G3	2000m (Good)	13	13	1.9 (1)	1st	2:02.6	-0.1	Yutaka Take	(Sing Like Talk)
Aug 17, 1997	4	Sapporo	Sapporo Kinen	G2	2000m (Firm)	13	7	1.8 (1)	1st	2:00.2	-0.4	Yutaka Take	(Erimo Chic)
Oct 26, 1997	4	Tokyo	Tenno Sho (Autumn)	G1	2000m (Firm)	16	12	4.0 (2)	1st	1:59.0	0.0	Yutaka Take	(Bubble Gum Fellow)
Nov 23, 1997	4	Tokyo	Japan Cup	G1	2400m (Firm)	14	9	4.0 (2)	2nd	2:25.8	0.0	Yutaka Take	Pilsudski
Dec 21, 1997	4	Nakayama	Arima Kinen	G1	2500m (Firm)	16	12	3.8 (2)	3rd	2:34.9	0.1	Olivier Peslier	Silk Justice
Apr 5, 1998	5	Hanshin	Sankei Ōsaka Hai	G2	2000m (Firm)	9	2	1.2 (1)	1st	2:01.3	-0.1	Yutaka Take	(Mejiro Dober)
Jun 21, 1998	5	Hanshin	Naruo Kinen	G2	2000m (Heavy)	14	9	1.3 (1)	2nd	2:04.1	0.5	Yutaka Take	Sunrise Flag
Jul 12, 1998	5	Hanshin	Takarazuka Kinen	G1	2200m (Firm)	13	5	4.7 (3)	3rd	2:12.1	0.2	Yutaka Take	Silence Suzuka
Aug 23, 1998	5	Sapporo	Sapporo Kinen	G2	2000m (Firm)	12	4	1.3 (1)	1st	1:59.5	-0.5	Yutaka Take	(Silent Hunter)
Nov 15, 1998	5	Kyoto	Queen Elizabeth II Commemorative Cup	G1	2200m (Firm)	14	3	1.4 (1)	3rd	2:13.1	0.3	Norihiro Yokoyama	Mejiro Dober
Nov 29, 1998	5	Tokyo	Japan Cup	G1	2400m (Firm)	15	1	4.6 (2)	2nd	2:26.3	0.4	Norihiro Yokoyama	El Condor Pasa
Dec 27, 1998	5	Nakayama	Arima Kinen	G1	2500m (Firm)	16	3	3.8 (2)	5th	2:32.9	0.8	Yutaka Take	Grass Wonder

Legend:

Turf

== Pedigree ==
Pedigree of Air Groove (JPN), 1993
Sire Tony Bin (IRE) b. 1983	Kampala (GB) b. 1976	Kalamoun	Zeddaan
Sire Tony Bin (IRE) b. 1983	Kampala (GB) b. 1976	Kalamoun	Khairunissa
Sire Tony Bin (IRE) b. 1983	Kampala (GB) b. 1976	State Pension	Only for Life
Sire Tony Bin (IRE) b. 1983	Kampala (GB) b. 1976	State Pension	Lorelei
Sire Tony Bin (IRE) b. 1983	Severn Bridge (GR) b. 1965	Hornbeam	Hyperion
Sire Tony Bin (IRE) b. 1983	Severn Bridge (GR) b. 1965	Hornbeam	Thicket
Sire Tony Bin (IRE) b. 1983	Severn Bridge (GR) b. 1965	Priddy Fair	Preciptic
Sire Tony Bin (IRE) b. 1983	Severn Bridge (GR) b. 1965	Priddy Fair	Campanette
Dam Dyna Carle (JPN) b. 1980	Northern Taste (CAN) b. 1971	Northern Dancer	Nearctic
Dam Dyna Carle (JPN) b. 1980	Northern Taste (CAN) b. 1971	Northern Dancer	Natalma
Dam Dyna Carle (JPN) b. 1980	Northern Taste (CAN) b. 1971	Lady Victoria	Victoria Park
Dam Dyna Carle (JPN) b. 1980	Northern Taste (CAN) b. 1971	Lady Victoria	Lady Angela
Dam Dyna Carle (JPN) b. 1980	Shadai Feather (JPN) b. 1973	Guersant	Bubbles
Dam Dyna Carle (JPN) b. 1980	Shadai Feather (JPN) b. 1973	Guersant	Montagnana
Dam Dyna Carle (JPN) b. 1980	Shadai Feather (JPN) b. 1973	Peroxide	Never Say Die
Dam Dyna Carle (JPN) b. 1980	Shadai Feather (JPN) b. 1973	Peroxide	Feather Ball
