= Admire Groove =

Japanese thoroughbred racehorse

Admire Groove アドマイヤグルーヴ
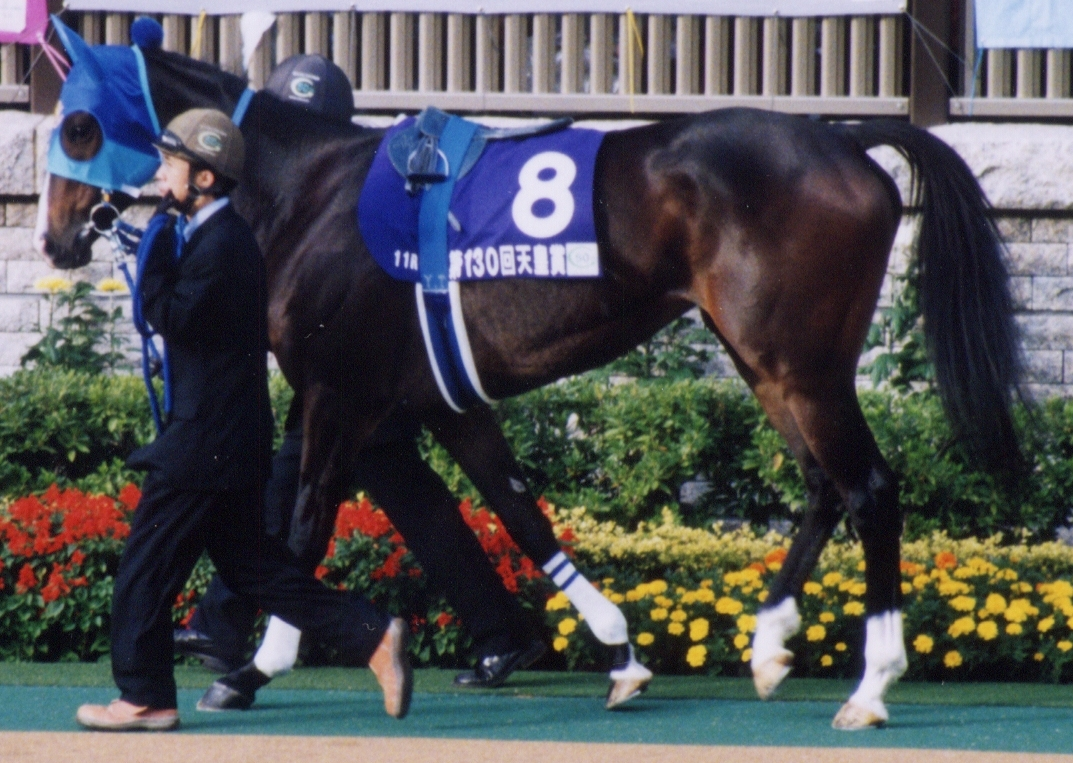
- Admire Groove in 2004.
- Breed: Thoroughbred
- Sire: Sunday Silence
- Grandsire: Halo
- Dam: Air Groove
- Damsire: Tony Bin
- Sex: Mare
- Foaled: April 30, 2000
- Died: October 15, 2012 (aged 12)
- Country: Japan
- Colour: Bay
- Breeder: Northern Farm
- Owner: Riichi Kondo
- Racing colours
- Trainer: Mitsuru Hashida
- Jockey: Yutaka Take
- Record: 21: 8-1-3
- Earnings: ¥551,335,000

Major wins
- Rose Stakes (2003); Queen Elizabeth II Cup (2003, 2004); Mermaid Stakes (2004); Hanshin Himba Stakes (2005)

Awards
- JRA Award for Best Older Filly or Mare (2004)

Admire Groove (Japanese: アドマイヤグルーヴ, Hepburn: Adomaiya Gurūvu; April 30, 2000 – October 15, 2012) was a Japanese Thoroughbred racehorse and broodmare who won the 2003 and 2004 Queen Elizabeth II Cup.

== Background ==
Admire Groove was foaled out of Air Groove, who was the 1997 Japanese Horse of the Year and won the Yushun Himba and Tenno Sho (Autumn) in her career. Air Groove's dam, Dyna Carle also won the Yushun Himba back in 1983, making Admire Groove the third generation horse in line that managed to win Grade 1 races. Her half-brothers through the dam were Rulership (2012 Queen Elizabeth II Cup) and Forgettable (2009 Stayers Stakes). She was sired by the thirteen times leading sire in Japan and 1989 American double crown (Kentucky Derby and Preakness Stakes) winner, Sunday Silence.

She was being auctioned at the 2000 summer select sales for foals at hip number 33. The bid for her started at the 70,000,000 ¥ mark. In the end, she was sold for 241,500,000 ¥ to Riichi Kondo, which at that time was the highest price ever paid at the select sales and also the highest price ever for a filly. Her name was chosen from fan votes in which the name Admire Groove won by landslide with 215 suggestions from the community.

The name itself was a combination of a Kondo's preferred crown name for his stable (Admire) and also her mother's name (Groove).

== Racing career ==
Admire Groove won her very first race, on November 10, 2002, at Kyoto. She also won her next two races at Hashin Racecourse, which included a win at the Wakaba Stakes.

Admire Groove's first major win was at the Grade-2 Rose Stakes on September 21, 2003. She came close to capturing the October Shūka Sho just weeks later, but finished second behind the second favourite, Still in Love who sealed the triple tiara at the very same race. She then picked up her first Grade-1 victory, by winning the 2003 Queen Elizabeth II Cup when she sneaked out with a nose margin over Still in Love.

Admire Groove picked up another win, at the 2004 Mermaid Stakes, on July 11, 2004. In the second half of the year, she competed in the Tenno Sho (Autumn) where she finished in third place, behind Zenno Rob Roy and Dance in the Mood. Then, she returned to the Queen Elizabeth II Cup in 2004, where she successfully defended her title.

Admire Groove tried to repeat the feat again at the 2005 Queen Elizabeth II Cup, but finished in 3rd place. On December 18, 2005, she grabbed her final win in her last race by winning the 2005 Hanshin Himba Stakes. A retirement ceremony soon followed.

== Breeding career ==
Admire Groove's most notable progeny is Duramente who won the Satsuki Shō and the Tōkyō Yūshun in 2015, and became the sire of multiple Grade 1 winners, such as Titleholder and Liberty Island.

c = colt, f = filly

No.	Name	Foaled	Sex	Color	Sire	Wins	Races	Remarks
1st	Admire Temba	2007	f	Gray	Kurofune	4	22	Retired, broodmare
2nd	Admire Sceptre	2008	f	Chestnut	King Kamehameha	5	27	Retired, broodmare
3rd	Admire Try	2009	c	Dark Bay	Symboli Kris S	2	13	Retired, riding horse
4th	(Admire Groove 2010)	2010	c		King Kamehameha			
5th	Beau Geste	2011	f	Chestnut	King Kamehameha	2	11	Retired, broodmare
6th	Duramente	2012	c	Bay	King Kamehameha	5	9	Retired, breeding stallion

== Death ==
On October 16, 2012, the JRA announced that Admire Groove had suddenly died the day prior at the Northern Farm, where she was a broodmare. It was only two days after her daughter Admire Sceptre won the Hakushu Stakes.

== In popular culture ==
An anthropomorphized version of Admire Groove appears as a character in the Japanese multimedia franchise Umamusume: Pretty Derby, voiced by Hina Suzuki. She is depicted as a cold, unruly, and standoffish girl who grew up as an orphan with no memory of her parents, which references how Air Groove's owner and trainer, Satoshi Yoshihara and Yuji Ito, were unable to purchase her real-life counterpart when she was auctioned as a foal. Due to feeling unable to understand love since her childhood, she despises friendship and attachment, and has an especially heated rivalry with Still in Love. She holds a grudge against Still in Love due to her prestigious accomplishment of winning the Triple Tiara, even despite her exceptional racing talents and having more public recognition.

== Racing form ==
Admire Groove won eight races and placed in another four out of 21 starts. This data is available based on JBIS and netkeiba.

Date	Racecourse	Race	Grade	Distance (Condition)	Entry	HN	Odds (Favored)	Finish	Time	Margins	Jockey	Winner (Runner-up)
2002 – two-year-old season
Nov 10	Kyoto	2yo Newcomer		1,800 m (Firm)	14	13	1.2 (1)	1st	1:51.8	–0.2	Yutaka Take	(Eishin Iidesan)
Dec 7	Hanshin	Erica Sho	ALW (1W)	2,000 m (Firm)	7	2	1.1 (1)	1st	2:03.0	–0.2	Yutaka Take	(T M Gulch O)
2003 – three-year-old season
Mar 22	Hanshin	Wakaba Stakes	OP	2,000 m (Firm)	10	9	1.7 (1)	1st	2:03.1	0.0	Yutaka Take	(Big Kong)
Apr 13	Hanshin	Oka Sho	1	1,600 m (Firm)	17	14	3.5 (1)	3rd	1:34.2	0.3	Yutaka Take	Still in Love
May 25	Tokyo	Yushun Himba	1	2,400 m (Firm)	17	2	1.7 (1)	7th	2:28.2	0.7	Yutaka Take	Still in Love
Sep 21	Hanshin	Rose Stakes	2	2,000 m (Firm)	12	1	3.0 (2)	1st	2:01.5	–0.2	Yutaka Take	(Yamakatsu Lily)
Oct 19	Kyoto	Shuka Sho	1	2,000 m (Firm)	18	10	2.5 (1)	2nd	1:59.2	0.1	Yutaka Take	Still in Love
Nov 16	Kyoto	QEII Cup	1	2,200 m (Firm)	15	7	3.6 (2)	1st	2:11.8	0.0	Yutaka Take	(Still in Love)
2004 – four-year-old season
Apr 4	Hanshin	Sankei Osaka Hai	2	2,000 m (Good)	11	8	6.4 (3)	7th	2:00.1	0.5	Yutaka Take	Neo Universe
May 24	Chukyo	Kinko Sho	2	2,000 m (Firm)	12	4	6.1 (4)	5th	1:58.1	0.6	Yutaka Take	Tap Dance City
Jul 11	Hanshin	Mermaid Stakes	3	2,000 m (Firm)	10	9	1.5 (1)	1st	2:00.0	–0.5	Yutaka Take	(Cheers Message)
Oct 10	Kyoto	Kyoto Daishoten	2	2,400 m (Firm)	10	9	5.1 (2)	4th	2:25.9	0.7	Yutaka Take	Narita Century
Oct 31	Tokyo	Tenno Sho (Autumn)	1	2,000 m (Good)	17	8	17.0 (9)	3rd	1:59.3	0.4	Yutaka Take	Zenno Rob Roy
Nov 14	Kyoto	QEII Cup	1	2,200 m (Firm)	18	12	3.3 (2)	1st	2:13.6	–0.1	Yutaka Take	(Osumi Haruka)
2005 – five-year-old season
Apr 3	Hanshin	Sankei Osaka Hai	2	2,000 m (Firm)	9	3	3.9 (2)	4th	1:59.4	0.4	Yutaka Take	Sunrise Pegasus
May 1	Kyoto	Tenno Sho (Spring)	1	3,200 m (Firm)	18	3	10.8 (6)	11th	3:17.7	1.2	Yutaka Take	Suzuka Mambo
May 28	Chukyo	Kinko Sho	2	2,000 m (Firm)	10	1	5.2 (3)	4th	1:59.5	0.6	Yutaka Take	Tap Dance City
Jun 26	Hanshin	Takarazuka Kinen	1	2,200 m (Firm)	15	12	31.2 (8)	8th	2:12.7	1.2	Yutaka Take	Sweep Tosho
Oct 30	Tokyo	Tenno Sho (Autumn)	1	2,000 m (Firm)	18	17	96.0 (17)	17th	2:01.1	1.0	Hiroyuki Uemura	Heavenly Romance
Nov 13	Kyoto	QEII Cup	1	2,200 m (Firm)	18	3	11.1 (4)	3rd	2:13.0	0.5	Hiroyuki Uemura	Sweep Tosho
Dec 18	Hanshin	Hanshin Himba Stakes	2	1,600 m (Firm)	11	5	4.5 (2)	1st	1:34.5	–0.1	Yutaka Take	(Meine Samantha)

Legend:
Turf

== Pedigree ==
Pedigree of Admire Groove (JPN), 2000
Sire Sunday Silence (USA) b. 1986	Halo (USA) b. 1969	Hail to Reason	Turn-To
Sire Sunday Silence (USA) b. 1986	Halo (USA) b. 1969	Hail to Reason	Nothirdchance
Sire Sunday Silence (USA) b. 1986	Halo (USA) b. 1969	Cosmah	Cosmic Bomb
Sire Sunday Silence (USA) b. 1986	Halo (USA) b. 1969	Cosmah	Almahmoud
Sire Sunday Silence (USA) b. 1986	Wishing Well (USA) b. 1975	Understanding	Promised Land
Sire Sunday Silence (USA) b. 1986	Wishing Well (USA) b. 1975	Understanding	Pretty Ways
Sire Sunday Silence (USA) b. 1986	Wishing Well (USA) b. 1975	Mountain Flower	Montparnasse
Sire Sunday Silence (USA) b. 1986	Wishing Well (USA) b. 1975	Mountain Flower	Edelweiss
Dam Air Groove (JPN) b. 1993	Tony Bin (IRE) b. 1983	Kampala	Kalamoun
Dam Air Groove (JPN) b. 1993	Tony Bin (IRE) b. 1983	Kampala	State Pension
Dam Air Groove (JPN) b. 1993	Tony Bin (IRE) b. 1983	Severn Bridge	Hornbeam
Dam Air Groove (JPN) b. 1993	Tony Bin (IRE) b. 1983	Severn Bridge	Priddy Fair
Dam Air Groove (JPN) b. 1993	Dyna Carle (JPN) b. 1980	Northern Taste	Northern Dancer
Dam Air Groove (JPN) b. 1993	Dyna Carle (JPN) b. 1980	Northern Taste	Lady Victoria
Dam Air Groove (JPN) b. 1993	Dyna Carle (JPN) b. 1980	Shadai Feather	Guersant
Dam Air Groove (JPN) b. 1993	Dyna Carle (JPN) b. 1980	Shadai Feather	Peroxide
