= Mermaid Stakes (Japan) =

Mermaid Stakes マーメイドステークス
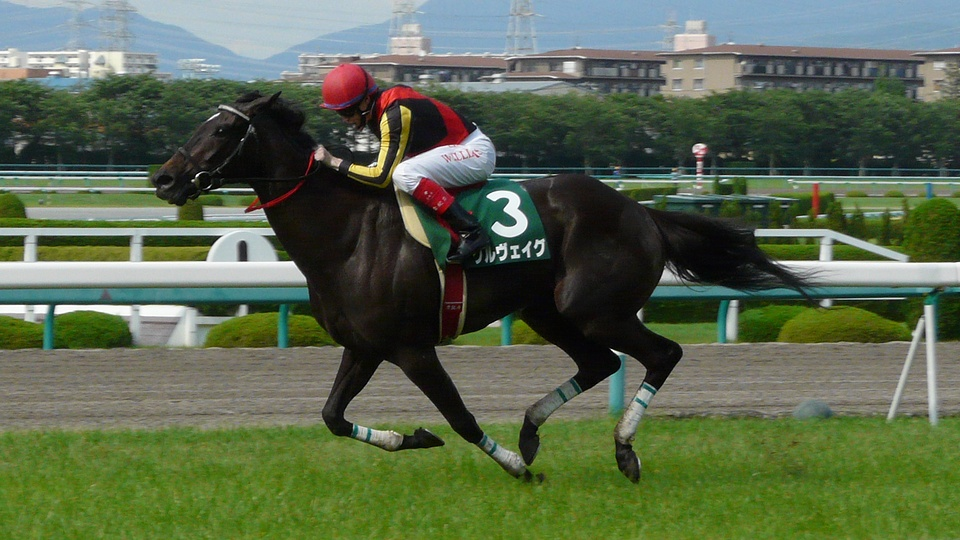
- Gullveig wins the 2012 Mermaid Stakes
- Class: Grade 3
- Location: Hanshin Racecourse
- Inaugurated: 1990
- Race type: Thoroughbred Flat racing

Race information
- Distance: 2,000 meters
- Surface: Turf
- Track: Right-handed
- Qualification: 3-y-o+ fillies and mares
- Weight: Handicap
- Purse: ¥ 82,380,000 (as of 2024): 1st: ¥ 38,000,000; 2nd: ¥ 15,000,000; 3rd: ¥ 10,000,000

The Mermaid Stakes (Japanese マーメイドステークス) is a defunct Grade 3 horse race for Thoroughbred fillies and mares aged three and over, that was run in Japan in June over a distance of 2000 metres on turf at Hanshin Racecourse.

It was first run in 1996 and had held Grade 3 status until it was discontinued in 2025. The 2006 contest took place at Kyoto Racecourse. The race was discontinued in 2025 due to Fuchu Himba Stakes replacing its schedule in the calendar as well as Ireland Trophy being created to replace the former's schedule.

== Winners ==
Year	Winner	Age	Jockey	Trainer	Time
1996	Shinin Racer	5	Hiroshi Kawachi	Takashi Takahashi	2:00.6
1997	Air Groove	4	Yutaka Take	Yuji Ito	2:02.6
1998	Run For The Dream	4	Hiroshi Kawachi	Kotaro Tanaka	2:00.0
1999	Erimo Excel	4	Hitoshi Matoba	Keiji Kato	2:03.6
2000	Fusaichi Airedale	4	Katsumi Ando	Kunihide Matsuda	1:58.9
2001	Taiki Polar	5	Katsumi Ando	Shigeki Matsumoto	1:59.2
2002	Yakamatsu Suzuran	5	Kenichi Ikezoe	Kaneo Ikezoe	1:59.1
2003	Rosebud	5	Norihiro Yokoyama	Kojiro Hashiguchi	2:03.7
2004	Admire Groove	4	Yutaka Take	Mitsuru Hashida	2:00.0
2005	Daiwa El Cielo	4	Yuichi Fukunaga	Kunihide Matsuda	2:00.5
2006 (Note: The race took place at Kyoto Racecourse)	Solid Platinum	3	Yukio Abe	Norihiro Tanaka	2:01.1
2007	Dear Chance	6	Yutaka Take	Izumu Shimizu	1:58.4
2008	Toho Shine	5	Yosuke Kono	Hiroki Sakiyama	2:03.5
2009	Cosmo Platina	6	Ryuji Wada	Toru Miya	2:00.2
2010	Brightia Pulse	5	Kota Fujioka	Osamu Hirata	1:59.5
2011	Fumino Imagine	5	Keisuke Dazai	Masaru Honda	2:00.4
2012	Gullveig	4	Craig Williams	Katsuhiko Sumii	1:59.9
2013	Marcellina	5	Yuga Kawada	Hiroyoshi Matsuda	1:59.4
2014	Dia De La Madre	4	Kota Fujioka	Katsuhiko Sumii	1:59.4
2015	Chateau Blanche	5	Kota Fujioka	Yoshitada Takahashi	2:00.5
2016	Lilavati	5	Fuma Matsuwaka	Sei Ishizaka	1:59.3
2017	Maximum de Paris	5	Yusuke Fujioka	Shigeki Matsumo	1:59.5
2018	Andriette	6	Kyosuke Kokubun	Kazuya Makita	1:59.1
2019	Solace	4	Fuma Matsuwaka	Masayuki Nishimura	2:00.3
2020	Summer Scent	4	Manabu Sakai	Takashi Saito	2:01.1
2021	Shamrock Hill	4	Takashi Fujikake	Shozo Sasaki	2:00.4
2022	Win Mighty	5	Ryuji Wada	Tadao Igarashi	1:58.3
2023	Big Ribbon	5	Atsuya Nishimura	Mitsumasa Nakauchida	1:58.5
2024	Alice Verite	4	Manami Nagashima	Kazuya Nakatake	1:57.2

== See also ==
- Horse racing in Japan
- List of Japanese flat horse races
