= Killer Ability =

Japanese Thoroughbred racehorse

Killer Ability; キラーアビリティ
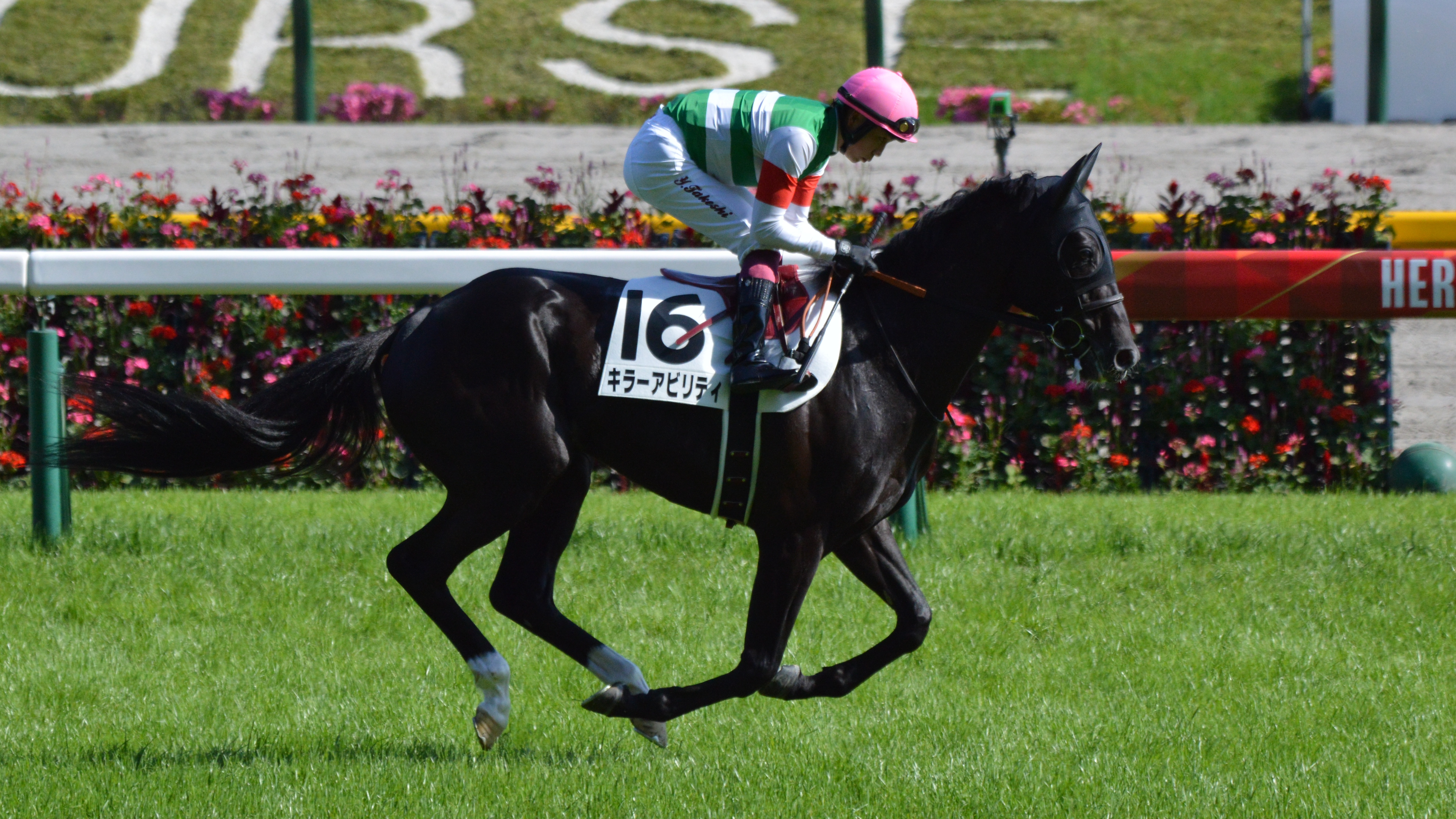
- Killer Ability at the Tokyo Yushun
- Sire: Deep Impact
- Grandsire: Sunday Silence
- Dam: Killer Graces
- Damsire: Congaree
- Sex: Stallion
- Foaled: 27 January 2019
- Country: Japan
- Colour: Brown
- Breeder: Northern Farm
- Owner: Carrot Farm
- Racing colours
- Trainer: Takashi Saito
- Jockey: Takeshi Yokoyama
- Record: 18: 3-2-0
- Earnings: ¥144,318,000

Major wins
- Hopeful Stakes (2021); Chunichi Shimbun Hai (2022)

Killer Ability (Japanese: キラーアビリティ, foaled 27 January 2019) is a Japanese Thoroughbred racehorse. He was one of the best two-year-olds in Japan in 2021 when he won two of his four races including the Grade 1 Hopeful Stakes.

== Background ==
Killer Ability is a brown colt with a white star and snip and white socks on his hind legs bred in Japan by Northern Farm. During his racing career he was trained by Takashi Saito and raced in the green, white and red colours of the Northern Farm associate Carrot Farm.

He was from the twelfth crop of foals sired by Deep Impact, who was the Japanese Horse of the Year in 2005 and 2006, winning races including the Tokyo Yushun, Tenno Sho, Arima Kinen and Japan Cup. Deep Impact's other progeny include Gentildonna, Loves Only You, Kizuna, A Shin Hikari, Contrail and Saxon Warrior. Killer Ability's dam Killer Graces was bred in Kentucky and raced with considerable success in the United States where she won three races including the Hollywood Starlet Stakes and ran second in the Breeders' Cup Filly & Mare Sprint. In November 2012 she was bought by Katsumi Yoshida and exported to Japan. She was descended from the American broodmare Regal Gleam who also produced Royal Glint and the dam of Caerleon.

== Racing career ==
=== 2021: two-year-old season ===
Killer Ability began his racing career in a contest for previously unraced juveniles over 1800 metres on firm ground at Tokyo Racecourse on 27 June 2021. Ridden by Christophe Lemaire he started the 2.9/1 second favourite but came home fifth of the eleven runners, three lengths behind the winner Red Belle Ame. Mirai Iwata was in the saddle two months later when the colt started 0.5/1 favourite for a maiden race over 2000 metres at Kokura Racecourse and scored his first success as he took the lead early in the straight and drew right away to win by seven lengths from Personal High in a record time of 1:59.5. Iwata took the ride again when Killer Ability was stepped up in class and started favourite for the Listed Hagi Stakes over 1800 metres at Hanshin on 30 October. He took the lead in the straight and looked the likely winner before being run down in the final strides and beaten a neck into second place by Danon Scorpion. His trainer commented "He was tense the whole time... he's still immature and he has a somewhat difficult temperament".

On 28 December at Nakayama Racecourse, Killer Ability was stepped up to Grade 1 class to contest Hopeful Stakes over 2000 metres and went off the 2.1/1 second choice in the betting behind Command Line (winner of the Saudi Arabia Royal Cup) in a fifteen-runner field. Ridden by Takeshi Yokoyama he settled in third place behind Grand Line and Born This Way before switching to the outside approaching the final turn. He gained the advantage from Born This Way entering the last 200 metres and won by one and a half length with a length and a quarter back to Lagulf in third. After the race Yokoyama commented "Sitting in the saddle in his workouts two weeks in a row convinced me that he was going to run and run fast. We sat in a good position and when the colt was able to relax in the backstretch, I had all the confidence I needed that he was going to win. I'm sure he will go on to improve further and become stronger".

In the official Japanese rankings Killer Ability was rated the second-best two-year-old of 2021, one pound behind the top-rated Do Deuce. In January 2022, at the JRA Awards, Killer Ability finished second to Do Deuce in the poll to determine the Best Two-Year-Old Colt.

=== 2022: three-year-old season ===
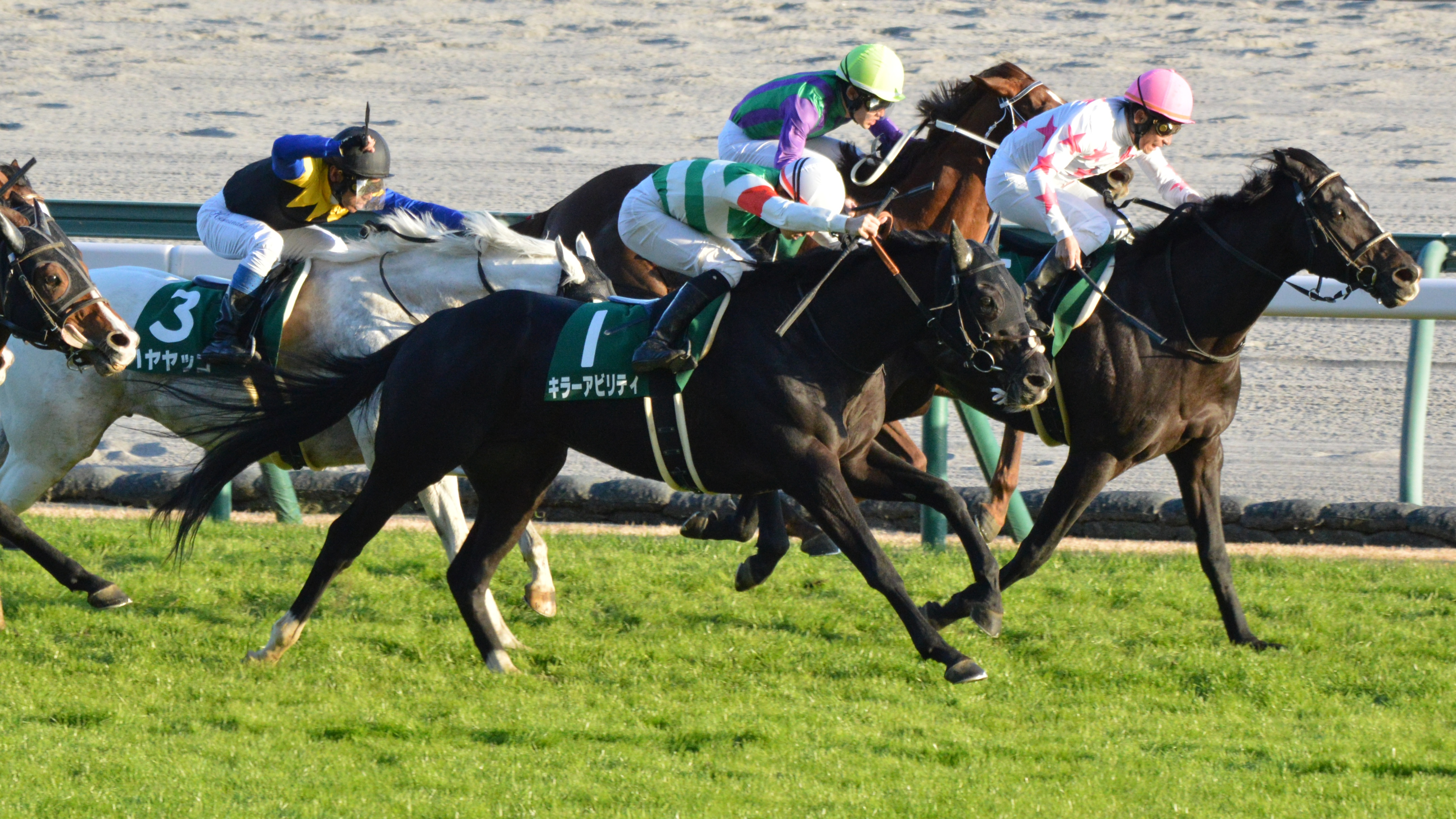
Killer Ability winning the Chunichi Shimbun Hai

On his first appearance as a three-year-old Killer Ability started the 6.6/1 fourth favourite for the Satsuki Sho over 2000 metres at Hanshin Racecourse on 17 April. He started poorly before settling in mid-division and faded in the closing stages to come home thirteenth of the eighteen runners, beaten just over six lengths by the winner Geoglyph. After the Satsuki Sho, Killer Ability was entered in to the Tōkyō Yūshun held on May 29, where he finished sixth behind Do Deuce.

Killer Ability took the summer off before returning to the turf by being entered in his first race with older horses, which was the GII Copa Republica Argentina held on November 6, but finished 8th. The following month, Killer Ability was entered in to the GIII Chunichi Shimbun Hai with Taisei Danno as his jockey. At that race, Killer Ability was able to make his way through a small gap in the pack, passing over Matenro Leo just before the finishing line, clinching his second group race victory.

=== 2023-25: four-to-six-year-old seasons ===
Killer Ability was entered in to multiple graded races as an older horse. However, he was unable to win any single one of them. His best showing was at the 2024 Neom Turf Cup, held at King Abdulaziz Racetrack in Saudi Arabia, where he finished second behind the English Spirit Dancer.

In May 2025, after returning from that year's Neom Turf Cup where he finished last, his owner, Carrot Farm, announced that the horse would be retired to stand stud in India.

== Racing Form ==
The following form is based on information available on JBIS-Search, netkeiba.com, and Racing Post.

Date	Track	Race	Grade	Distance (Condition)	Entry	HN	Odds （Favored）	Finish	Time	Margin	Jockey	Winner (Runner-Up)
2021 – two-year-old season
June 27	Hanshin	2YO Debut Race		Turf 1800m（Firm）	11	10	3.9（2）	5th	1:48.4	0.5	Christophe Lemaire	Red Belle Ame
Aug 28	Kokura	2YO Maiden		Turf 2000m（Firm）	9	7	1.5（1）	1st	R1:59.5（34.2）	-1.1	Mirai Iwata	（Personal High）
Oct 30	Hanshin	Hagi Stakes	L	Turf 1800m（Firm）	6	4	1.5（1）	2nd	1:48.5（33.6）	0.0	Mirai Iwata	Danon Scorpion
Dec 28	Nakayama	Hopeful Stakes	GI	Turf 2000m（Firm）	15	5	3.1（2）	1st	R2:00.6（35.8）	-0.2	Takeshi Yokoyama	（Justin Palace）
2022 – three-year-old season
Apr 17	Nakayama	Satsuki Shō	GI	Turf 2000m（Firm）	18	4	7.6（4）	13th	2:00.6（35.0）	0.9	Takeshi Yokoyama	Geoglyph
May 29	Tokyo	Tōkyō Yūshun	GI	Turf 2400m（Firm）	18	16	33.4（8）	6th	2:22.9（34.5）	1.0	Takeshi Yokoyama	Do Deuce
Nov 6	Tokyo	Copa Republica Argentina	GII	Turf 2500m（Firm）	18	6	3.8（2）	8th	2:31.6（33.8）	0.5	Cristian Demuro	Breakup
Dec 10	Chukyo	Chunichi Shimbun Hai	GIII	Turf 2000m（Firm）	18	1	7.6（5人）	1st	1:59.4（34.0）	0.0	Taisei Danno	（Matenro Leo）
2023 – four-year-old season
Feb 12	Hanshin	Kyōto Kinen	GII	Turf 2200m（Firm）	13	9	6.8（3）	5th	2:11.8（35.0）	0.9	Bauyrzhan Murzabayev	Do Deuce
Apr 2	Hanshin	Ōsaka Hai	GI	Turf 2000m（Firm）	16	12	41.1（11）	13th	1:58.3（35.2）	0.9	Taisei Danno	Jack d'Or
May 7	Niigata	Niigata Daishoten	GIII	Turf 2000m（Heavy）	16	10	13.4（7）	5th	2:05.8（37.1）	2.0	Yuichi Kitamura	Karate
Oct 21	Tokyo	Fuji Stakes	GII	Turf 1600m（Firm）	12	10	32.9（10）	12th	1:33.1（34.3）	1.7	Takeshi Yokoyama	Namur
Dec 9	Chukyo	Chunichi Shimbun Hai	GIII	Turf 2000m（Firm）	17	12	14.9（8）	4th	1:59.0（34.3）	0.2	Bauyrzhan Murzabayev	Yamanin Salvum
2024 – five-year-old season
Feb 24	King Abdulaziz	Neom Turf Cup	GII	Turf 2100m（Firm）	13	8	6.8（8）	2nd	2:07.10（35.0）	0.1	Cristian Demuro	Spirit Dancer
Mar 31	Hanshin	Ōsaka Hai	GI	Turf 2000m（Firm）	16	12	82.4（14）	15th	2:00.2（36.0）	2.0	Yuichi Kitamura	Bellagio Opera
Sep 22	Nakayama	Sankei Sho All Comers	GII	Turf 2200m（Firm）	15	9	56.6（11）	10th	2:12.4（34.3）	0.6	Taisei Danno	Lebensstil
Nov 15	Bahrain	Bahrain International Trophy	GII	Turf 2000m（Firm）	12	4		8th	2:04.5	2.2	Oisin Murphy	Spirit Dancer
2025 – six-year-old season
Feb 22	King Abdulaziz	Neom Turf Cup	GII	Turf 2100m（Firm）	10	5	33.0（7人）	10th	2:09.49	1.75	Oisin Murphy	Shin Emperor

- The "R" indicates that a track record had been set by the horse.

== Pedigree ==
Pedigree of Killer Ability (JPN), brown colt 2019
Sire Deep Impact (JPN) 2002	Sunday Silence (USA); 1986	Halo	Hail to Reason
Sire Deep Impact (JPN) 2002	Sunday Silence (USA); 1986	Halo	Cosmah
Sire Deep Impact (JPN) 2002	Sunday Silence (USA); 1986	Wishing Well	Understanding
Sire Deep Impact (JPN) 2002	Sunday Silence (USA); 1986	Wishing Well	Mountain Flower
Sire Deep Impact (JPN) 2002	Wind in Her Hair (IRE); 1991	Alzao (USA)	Lyphard
Sire Deep Impact (JPN) 2002	Wind in Her Hair (IRE); 1991	Alzao (USA)	Lady Rebecca (GB)
Sire Deep Impact (JPN) 2002	Wind in Her Hair (IRE); 1991	Burghclere (GB)	Busted
Sire Deep Impact (JPN) 2002	Wind in Her Hair (IRE); 1991	Burghclere (GB)	Highclere
Dam Killer Graces (USA) 2009	Congaree (USA); 1998	Arazi	Blushing Groom (FR)
Dam Killer Graces (USA) 2009	Congaree (USA); 1998	Arazi	Danseur Fabuleux
Dam Killer Graces (USA) 2009	Congaree (USA); 1998	Mari's Sheba	Mari's Book
Dam Killer Graces (USA) 2009	Congaree (USA); 1998	Mari's Sheba	Sheba Little (GB)
Dam Killer Graces (USA) 2009	Heatherdoesntbluff (USA); 12003	Old Trieste	A.P. Indy
Dam Killer Graces (USA) 2009	Heatherdoesntbluff (USA); 12003	Old Trieste	Lovelier Linda
Dam Killer Graces (USA) 2009	Heatherdoesntbluff (USA); 12003	Michigan Bluff	Skywalker
Dam Killer Graces (USA) 2009	Heatherdoesntbluff (USA); 12003	Michigan Bluff	Middlefork Rapids (Family: 1-x)
