= Dolce More =

Japanese Thoroughbred racehorse (foaled 2020)

Dolce More ドルチェモア
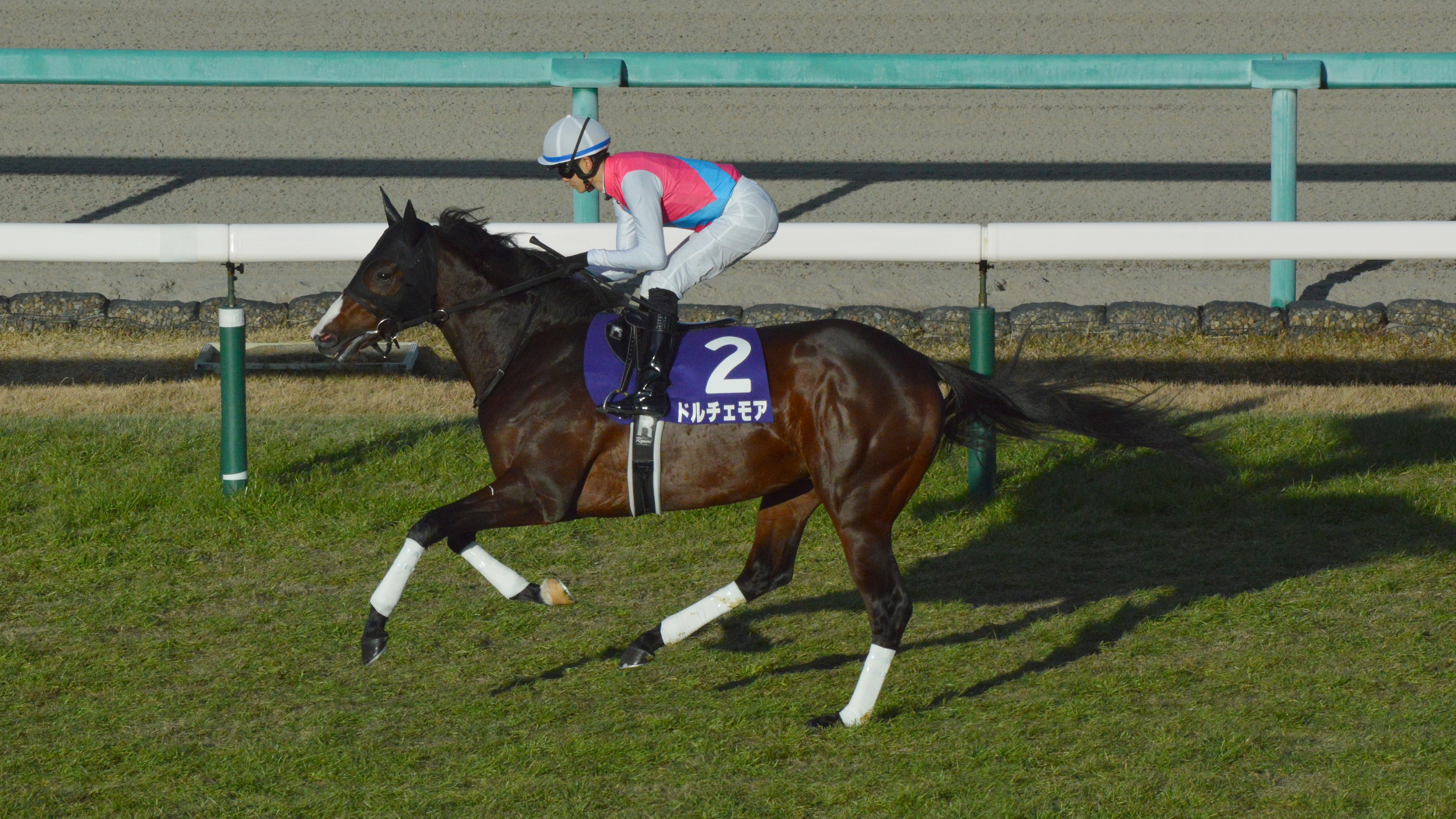
- Dolce More at the 2022 Asahi Hai Futurity Stakes
- Breed: Thoroughbred
- Sire: Rulership
- Grandsire: King Kamehameha
- Dam: Ayusan
- Damsire: Deep Impact
- Sex: Colt
- Foaled: 21 February 2020
- Country: Japan
- Colour: Bay
- Breeder: Shimokobe Bokujo
- Owner: Three H Racing
- Racing colours
- Trainer: Shosuke Sugai → Yuki Uehara → Kazuya Takahashi → Terunobu Fujita
- Jockey: Kazuo Yokoyama; Ryusei Sakai
- Record: 21: 3-0-0 (15 JRA: 3-0-0; 6 NAR: 0-0-0)
- Earnings: ¥113,440,000

Major wins
- Asahi Hai Futurity Stakes (2022); Saudi Arabia Royal Cup (2022)

Awards
- JRA Award for Best Two-Year-Old Colt (2022)

Dolce More (Japanese: ドルチェモア, Hepburn: Doruche Moa; foaled 21 February 2020) is a retired Japanese Thoroughbred racehorse. He competed from 2022 to 2025, recording three wins in twenty-one starts, including the Asahi Hai Futurity Stakes (GI) and Saudi Arabia Royal Cup (GIII) in 2022. He was named JRA Award for Best Two-Year-Old Colt in 2022. His racing name combines "Dolce," the Italian word for "sweet," with "More."

== Background ==
Dolce More is a bay colt bred in Hidaka, Hokkaido, by Shimokobe Bokujo. He was sired by Rulership, a son of King Kamehameha, and his dam was Ayusan, a daughter of Deep Impact who won the 2013 Oka Shō (GI). He was owned by Three H Racing and sent into training with Shosuke Sugai at the JRA's Ritto Training Center.

== Racing career ==
=== 2022: two-year-old season ===
Dolce More debuted on August 20, 2022, in a maiden race on the turf at Sapporo Racecourse, ridden by Kazuo Yokoyama, winning by three lengths. On October 8, he won the Saudi Arabia Royal Cup (GIII) at Tokyo Racecourse by 1.25 lengths.

On December 18, he contested the Asahi Hai Futurity Stakes (GI) at Hanshin Racecourse. Ridden by Ryusei Sakai, he was the 3.1-to-1 favourite in a field of seventeen. He was positioned in a good position before finishing strongly to defeat Danon Touchdown by 0.1 seconds, completing an undefeated three-race winning streak and achieving a mother-son Grade 1 victory with his dam Ayusan.

=== 2023: three-year-old season ===
Dolce More finished seventh in the New Zealand Trophy (GII) at Nakayama Racecourse in April and twelfth in the NHK Mile Cup (GI) at Tokyo in May. He finished eighteenth (last) in the Yasuda Kinen (GI) at Tokyo in June. He finished thirteenth in the Centaur Stakes (GII) at Hanshin in September and twelfth in the Sprinters Stakes (GI) at Nakayama in October. He was transferred to the stable of Yuki Uehara at Miho in October. He finished seventeenth (last) in the Chunichi Shimbun Hai (GIII) at Chukyo Racecourse in December.

=== 2024: four-year-old season ===
Dolce More finished eighteenth (last) in the Kyoto Kimpai (GIII) at Kyoto Racecourse in January, thirteenth in the Tokyo Shimbun Hai (GIII) at Tokyo in February, and fourteenth in the Lord Derby Challenge Trophy (GIII) at Nakayama in March. He was transferred to the stable of Kazuya Takahashi at Ritto during the summer break. He finished sixteenth (last) in the Keisei Hai Autumn Handicap (GIII) at Nakayama in September, fifteenth in the Green Channel Cup (Listed) at Tokyo in October, and fifteenth in the Musashino Stakes (GIII) at Tokyo in November. He was deregistered from JRA competition on November 14, 2024, and transferred to the NAR stable of Terunobu Fujita at Oi Racecourse. He finished fifth in the Viola Sho (Open) at Oi in December.

=== 2025: five-year-old season and retirement ===
Dolce More finished eleventh in the Winter Sprint (Open) at Oi in January, fifth in the Tamagawa Open at Kawasaki Racecourse in February, and fifth in the Baika Sho (Open) at Urawa Racecourse in February. He finished ninth in the Yurikamome Open at Oi in June and eighth in the July Sho (Open) at Oi in July. His retirement was announced by Shimokobe Bokujo on July 14, 2025.

== Statistics ==
The following table details all 21 starts of Dolce More's racing career based on official netkeiba and JBIS records.

Date	Distance (Condition)	Race	Class	Course	Odds (Favourite)	Field	Finish	Time	Jockey	Winning (Losing) Margin	Winner (2nd Place)	Ref
2022 – two-year-old season
Aug 20	Turf 1500 m (Good)	2-Y-O Newcomer	Maiden	Sapporo	3.9 (1st)	12	1st	1:32.2	Kazuo Yokoyama	–0.5	(Run Free Banks)	
Oct 8	Turf 1600 m (Firm)	Saudi Arabia Royal Cup	GIII	Tokyo	6.8 (2nd)	9	1st	1:33.4	Kazuo Yokoyama	–0.2	(Granite)	
Dec 18	Turf 1600 m (Firm)	Asahi Hai Futurity Stakes	GI	Hanshin	3.1 (1st)	17	1st	1:33.9	Ryusei Sakai	–0.1	(Danon Touchdown)	
2023 – three-year-old season
Apr 8	Turf 1600 m (Good)	New Zealand Trophy	GII	Nakayama	1.7 (1st)	16	7th	1:34.3	Kazuo Yokoyama	0.6	Eeyan	
May 7	Turf 1600 m (Good)	NHK Mile Cup	GI	Tokyo	7.6 (4th)	17	12th	1:34.9	Kosei Miura	1.1	Champagne Color	
Jun 4	Turf 1600 m (Firm)	Yasuda Kinen	GI	Tokyo	166.9 (17th)	18	18th	1:34.3	Ryusei Sakai	2.9	Songline	
Sep 10	Turf 1200 m (Firm)	Centaur Stakes	GII	Hanshin	27.2 (8th)	15	13th	1:08.3	Kenichi Ikezoe	1.1	T M Spada	
Oct 1	Turf 1200 m (Firm)	Sprinters Stakes	GI	Nakayama	149.8 (16th)	16	12th	1:09.0	Atsuya Nishimura	1.0	Mama Cocha	
Dec 9	Turf 2000 m (Firm)	Chunichi Shimbun Hai	GIII	Chukyo	34.7 (12th)	17	17th	2:00.3	Taisei Danno	1.5	Yamanin Salvum	
2024 – four-year-old season
Jan 6	Turf 1600 m (Firm)	Kyoto Kimpai	GIII	Kyoto	125.9 (16th)	18	18th	1:35.7	Taisei Danno	1.9	Corepetiteur	
Feb 4	Turf 1600 m (Firm)	Tokyo Shimbun Hai	GIII	Tokyo	190.5 (16th)	16	13th	1:33.5	Shu Ishibashi	1.4	Sakura Toujours	
Mar 30	Turf 1600 m (Good)	Lord Derby Challenge Trophy	GIII	Nakayama	127.5 (16th)	16	14th	1:34.3	Hiroyuki Uchida	1.4	Parallel Vision	
Sep 8	Turf 1600 m (Firm)	Keisei Hai Autumn Handicap	GIII	Nakayama	231.3 (16th)	16	16th	1:33.6	Yuichi Kitamura	2.8	Ascoli Piceno	
Oct 6	Dirt 1600 m (Heavy)	Green Channel Cup	Listed	Tokyo	120.5 (14th)	16	15th	1:37.8	Atsuya Nishimura	3.6	Shonan Raishin	
Nov 9	Dirt 1600 m (Firm)	Musashino Stakes	GIII	Tokyo	226.8 (15th)	15	15th	1:46.1	Kosei Miura	10.1	Emperor Wakea	
Dec 3	Dirt 1200 m (Firm)	Viola Sho	Open	Oi	9.9 (4th)	16	5th	1:13.0	Takashi Yano	1.1	Exalt	
2025 – five-year-old season
Jan 15	Dirt 1200 m (Firm)	Winter Sprint	Open	Oi	28.0 (6th)	11	11th	1:13.9	Yoichi Ando	1.5	Duelist	
Feb 6	Dirt 1600 m (Firm)	Tamagawa Open	Open	Kawasaki	57.2 (7th)	13	5th	1:44.2	Seiji Yamazaki	2.4	Alan Barows	
Feb 26	Dirt 1400 m (Firm)	Baika Sho	Open	Urawa	29.6 (5th)	7	5th	1:28.3	Seiji Yamazaki	1.9	Lord Gladio	
Jun 10	Dirt 1200 m (Good)	Yurikamome Open	Open	Oi	9.2 (5th)	10	9th	1:13.3	Takashi Yano	1.4	Polygon Wave	
Jul 3	Dirt 1400 m (Firm)	July Sho	Open	Oi	18.8 (4th)	8	8th	1:29.0	Ryan Quatro	4.2	Satono Tempest	

== Pedigree ==
Pedigree of Dolce More (JPN)
Sire Rulership (JPN) 2007	King Kamehameha (JPN); 2001	Kingmambo	Mr. Prospector
Sire Rulership (JPN) 2007	King Kamehameha (JPN); 2001	Kingmambo	Miesque
Sire Rulership (JPN) 2007	King Kamehameha (JPN); 2001	Manfath	Last Tycoon
Sire Rulership (JPN) 2007	King Kamehameha (JPN); 2001	Manfath	Pilot Bird
Sire Rulership (JPN) 2007	Air Groove (JPN); 1993	Tony Bin	Kampala
Sire Rulership (JPN) 2007	Air Groove (JPN); 1993	Tony Bin	Severn Bridge
Sire Rulership (JPN) 2007	Air Groove (JPN); 1993	Dyna Carle	Northern Taste
Sire Rulership (JPN) 2007	Air Groove (JPN); 1993	Dyna Carle	Shadai Feather
Dam Ayusan (JPN) 2010	Deep Impact (JPN); 2002	Sunday Silence	Halo
Dam Ayusan (JPN) 2010	Deep Impact (JPN); 2002	Sunday Silence	Wishing Well
Dam Ayusan (JPN) 2010	Deep Impact (JPN); 2002	Wind in Her Hair	Alzao
Dam Ayusan (JPN) 2010	Deep Impact (JPN); 2002	Wind in Her Hair	Burghclere
Dam Ayusan (JPN) 2010	Buy the Cat (USA); 1995	Storm Cat	Storm Bird
Dam Ayusan (JPN) 2010	Buy the Cat (USA); 1995	Storm Cat	Terlingua
Dam Ayusan (JPN) 2010	Buy the Cat (USA); 1995	Buy the Firm	Affirmed
Dam Ayusan (JPN) 2010	Buy the Cat (USA); 1995	Buy the Firm	By the Hand

- Dolce More is inbred 5 × 5 to Northern Dancer.
- His dam Ayusan won the 2013 Oka Shō (GI).
- His sire Rulership won the 2012 Queen Elizabeth II Cup (GI) in Hong Kong.

== See also ==
- Thoroughbred racing in Japan
- Asahi Hai Futurity Stakes
- Ayusan
