= Ayusan =

Japanese Thoroughbred racehorse

Ayusan; アユサン
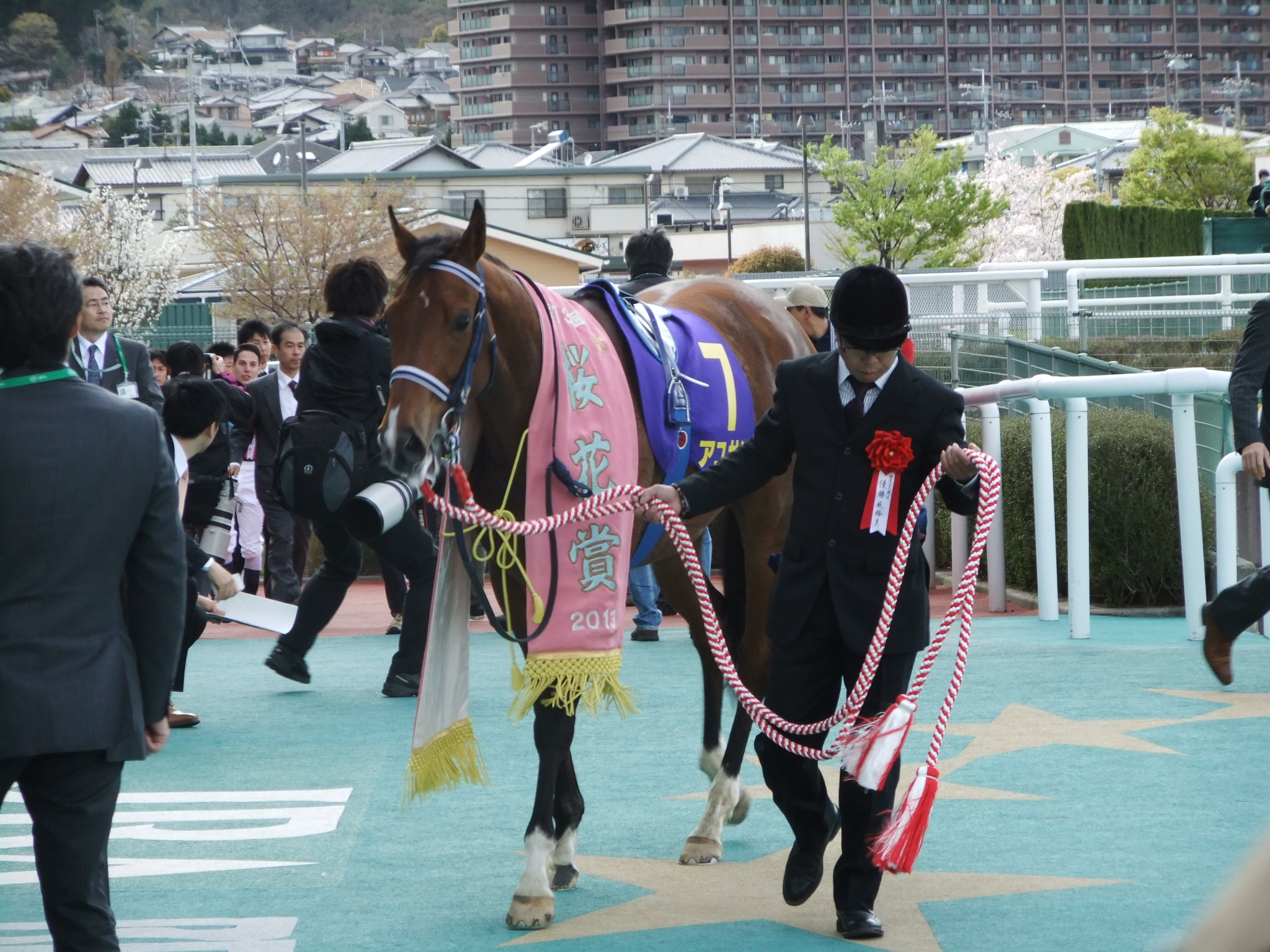
- Ayusan in 2013
- Sire: Deep Impact
- Grandsire: Sunday Silence
- Dam: Buy The Cat
- Damsire: Storm Cat
- Sex: Mare
- Foaled: 21 February 2010
- Country: Japan
- Colour: Bay
- Breeder: Shimokobe Farm
- Owner: Jyuichi Hoshino
- Racing colours
- Trainer: Takahisa Tezuka
- Jockey: Cristian Demuro; Genki Maruyama
- Record: 8: 2-1-1
- Earnings: ¥158,745,000

Major wins
- Japanese Classic Tiara Race wins: Oka Sho (2013)

Ayusan (Japanese: アユサン, foaled 21 February 2010) is a Japanese Thoroughbred racehorse and broodmare best known for her win in the 2013 Oka Sho. As a two-year-old she won on her debut before finishing second in the Artemis Stakes and seventh in the Hanshin Juvenile Fillies. In the following year she ran third in the Tulip Sho before taking the Oka Sho and went on to finish fourth in the Yushun Himba. After failing in two starts in 2014 she was retired from racing.

== Background ==
Ayusan is a bay mare with a white star and snip and four white socks bred in Japan by Shimokobe Farm. During her racing career she was owned by Juichi Hoshin and trained by Takahisa Tezuka. She was ridden in most of her races by Genki Maruyama.

She was from the third crop of foals sired by Deep Impact, who was the Japanese Horse of the Year in 2005 and 2006, winning races including the Tokyo Yushun, Tenno Sho, Arima Kinen and Japan Cup. Deep Impact's other progeny include Gentildonna, Harp Star, Kizuna, A Shin Hikari, Marialite and Saxon Warrior. Ayusan's dam Buy The Cat was a Kentucky-bred mare who won one minor race from three starts and was exported to Japan after being sold for $60,000 at Keeneland in November 2006. She was a descendant of the American broodmare Demolition, making her a distant relative of the St Leger winner Lucarno.

== Racing career ==
=== 2012: two-year-old season ===
Ayusan began her track career in a contest for previously unraced juveniles over 1400 metres at Tokyo Racecourse on 6 October and won from Hishi Last Guy and eleven others. Four weeks later at the same track she was stepped up in class and distance for the Listed Artemis Stakes over 1600 metres in which she finished a close second to Collector Item. Despite her defeat she was moved up to the highest class for the Grade 1 Hanshin Juvenile Fillies in December and came home seventh of the eighteen runners, four lengths behind the winner Robe Tissage.

In the Japanese Thoroughbred rankings for two-year-olds on turf, Ayusan was given a rating of 104, making her the seventh-best filly of her generation, four pounds below the top-rated Robe Tissage.

=== 2013: three-year-old season ===
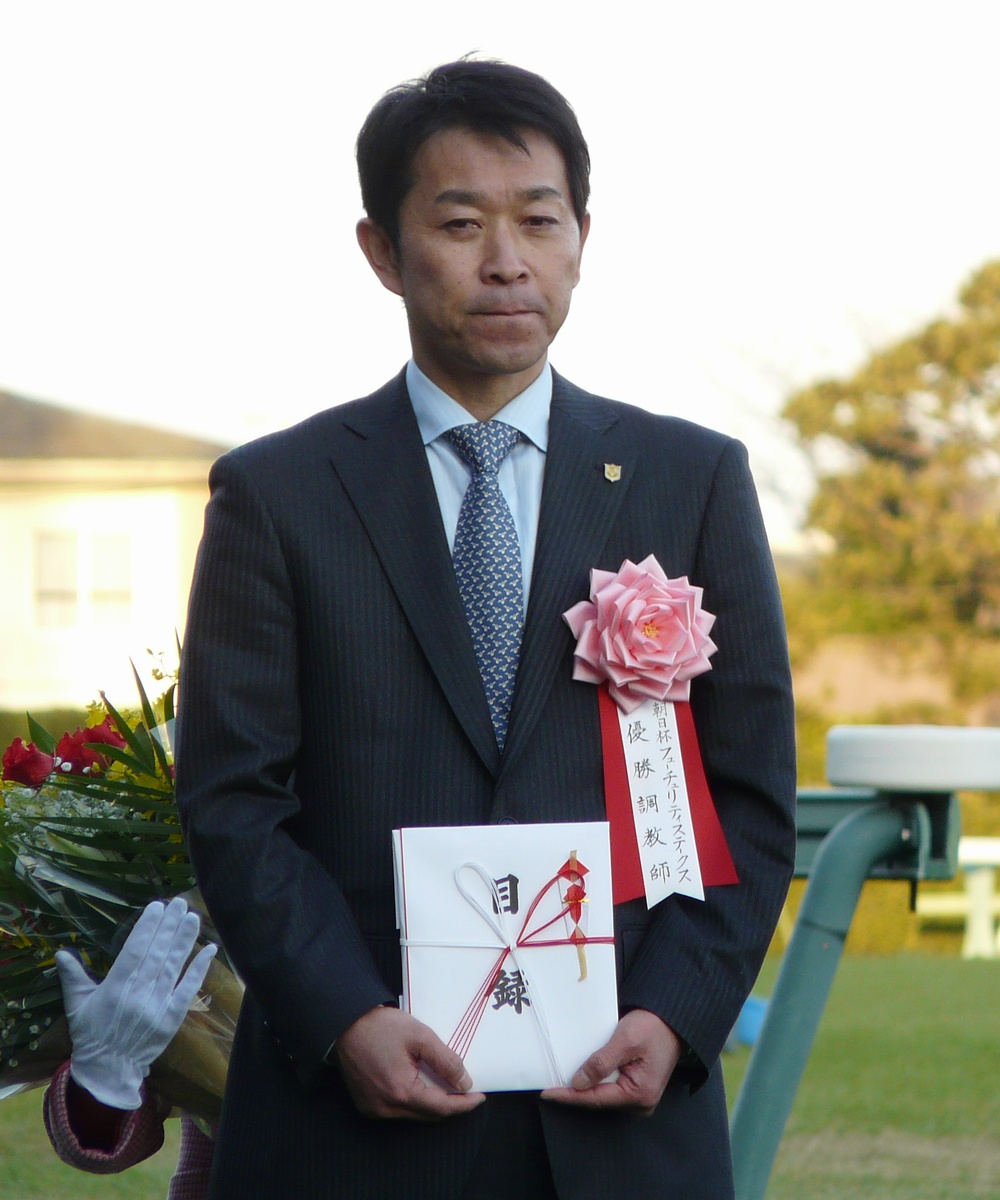
Ayusan's trainer Takahisa Tezuka

On her three-year-old debut, Ayusan started at odds of 12.6/1 for the Tulip Sho (a major trial race for the Oka Sho) over 1600 metres at Hanshin and finished third, beaten three and a half lengths and three quarters of a length by Kuforfune Surprise and Win Primera. Cristian Demuro took the ride (Maruyama was injured) when Ayusan started a 17/1 outsider for 73rd running of the Oka Sho at Hanshin on 7 April. Kurofune Surprise started favourite, while the other sixteen runners included Red Oval, Crown Rose (Fairy Stakes), Tosen Soleil, Meisho Mambo, Robe Tissage and Collector Item. Ayusan raced in mid-division before overcoming an obstructed run early in the straight to overtake the front-running Kurofune Surprise 200 metres from the finish. She repelled the late run of Red Opal to win by a neck with third place going to the 86/1 outsider Princess Jack.

At Tokyo on 19 May, with Maruyama in the saddle, Ayusan went off at odds of 5.5/1 for the Yushun Himba over 2400 metres. She finished fourth of the eighteen runners behind Meisho Mambo, Ever Blossom and Denim And Ruby.

In the Japanese Thoroughbred rankings for three-year-olds on turf Ayusan was given a rating of 110, making her the fourth-best filly of her generation, six pounds below the top-rated Denim And Ruby.

=== 2014: four-year-old season ===
Ayusan remained in training as a four-year-old but made little impact in her two races. She finished last of the fifteen runners behind Just A Way in the Nakayama Kinen over 1800 metres in April and then ran eleventh in the following month at the same track in the Lord Derby Challenge Trophy, five lengths behind the winner Curren Black Hill.

== Racing form ==
Ayusan won two races in eight starts. This data is available in JBIS and netkeiba.

Date	Track	Race	Grade	Distance (Condition)	Entry	HN	Odds (Favored)	Finish	Time	Margins	Jockey	Winner (Runner-up)
2012 – two-year-old season
Oct 6	Tokyo	2yo Newcomer		1,400 m (Firm)	13	12	2.8 (1)	1st	1:25.0	–0.3	Masayoshi Ebina	(Hishi Last Guy)
Nov 3	Tokyo	Artemis Stakes	L	1,600 m (Firm)	18	8	8.9 (4)	2nd	1:33.9	0.1	Genki Maruyama	Collector Item
Dec 9	Hanshin	Hanshin Juvenile Fillies	1	1,600 m (Firm)	18	18	7.4 (4)	7th	1:34.8	0.6	Genki Maruyama	Robe Tissage
2013 – three-year-old season
Mar 2	Hanshin	Tulip Sho	3	1,600 m (Firm)	15	6	13.6 (5)	3rd	1:35.6	0.7	Genki Maruyama	Kurofune Surprise
Apr 7	Hanshin	Oka Sho	1	1,600 m (Firm)	18	7	18.0 (7)	1st	1:35.0	0.0	Cristian Demuro	(Red Oval)
May 19	Tokyo	Yushun Himba	1	2,400 m (Firm)	18	4	6.5 (3)	4th	2:25.9	0.7	Genki Maruyama	Meisho Mambo
2014 – four-year-old season
Mar 2	Nakayama	Nakayama Kinen	2	1,800 m (Good)	15	7	59.7 (13)	15th	1:51.6	1.8	Genki Maruyama	Just A Way
Apr 6	Nakayama	Lord Derby Challenge Trophy	3	1,600 m (Good)	16	10	33.6 (11)	11th	1:35.4	0.8	Genki Maruyama	Curren Black Hill

Legend:
Turf

== Breeding record ==
Ayusan was retired from racing to become a broodmare. She has produced nine foals:

- Astrantia, a chestnut filly, foaled in 2016, sired by King Kamehameha. Unraced.
- Applause Yu, bay filly, 2017, by Rulership. Failed to win in four races.
- Upstream, bay filly, 2018, by King Kamehameha. Won two races.
- Engidaruma, bay colt, 2019, by Rulership. Won one race.
- Dolce More, bay colt, 2020, by Rulership. Won Asahi Hai Futurity Stakes.
- Best Scene, bay colt, 2022, by Rey de Oro. Won two races.
- unnamed, bay colt, 2023, by Rulership
- unnamed, bay filly, 2024 by Rey de Oro
- unnamed, bay filly, 2026 by Leontes

== Pedigree ==
Pedigree of Ayusan (JPN), bay filly, 2010
Sire Deep Impact (JPN) 2002	Sunday Silence (USA); 1986	Halo	Hail to Reason
Sire Deep Impact (JPN) 2002	Sunday Silence (USA); 1986	Halo	Cosmah
Sire Deep Impact (JPN) 2002	Sunday Silence (USA); 1986	Wishing Well	Understanding
Sire Deep Impact (JPN) 2002	Sunday Silence (USA); 1986	Wishing Well	Mountain Flower
Sire Deep Impact (JPN) 2002	Wind in Her Hair (IRE); 1991	Alzao (USA)	Lyphard
Sire Deep Impact (JPN) 2002	Wind in Her Hair (IRE); 1991	Alzao (USA)	Lady Rebecca (GB)
Sire Deep Impact (JPN) 2002	Wind in Her Hair (IRE); 1991	Burghclere (GB)	Busted
Sire Deep Impact (JPN) 2002	Wind in Her Hair (IRE); 1991	Burghclere (GB)	Highclere
Dam Buy The Cat (USA) 1995	Storm Cat (USA); 1983	Storm Bird (CAN)	Northern Dancer
Dam Buy The Cat (USA) 1995	Storm Cat (USA); 1983	Storm Bird (CAN)	South Ocean
Dam Buy The Cat (USA) 1995	Storm Cat (USA); 1983	Terlingua	Secretariat
Dam Buy The Cat (USA) 1995	Storm Cat (USA); 1983	Terlingua	Crimson Saint
Dam Buy The Cat (USA) 1995	Buy The Firm (USA); 1986	Affirmed	Exclusive Native
Dam Buy The Cat (USA) 1995	Buy The Firm (USA); 1986	Affirmed	Won't Tell You
Dam Buy The Cat (USA) 1995	Buy The Firm (USA); 1986	By The Hand	Intentionally
Dam Buy The Cat (USA) 1995	Buy The Firm (USA); 1986	By The Hand	De Hostess (Family: 9-f)
