= Danon Scorpion =

Japanese Thoroughbred racehorse

Danon Scorpion; ダノンスコーピオン
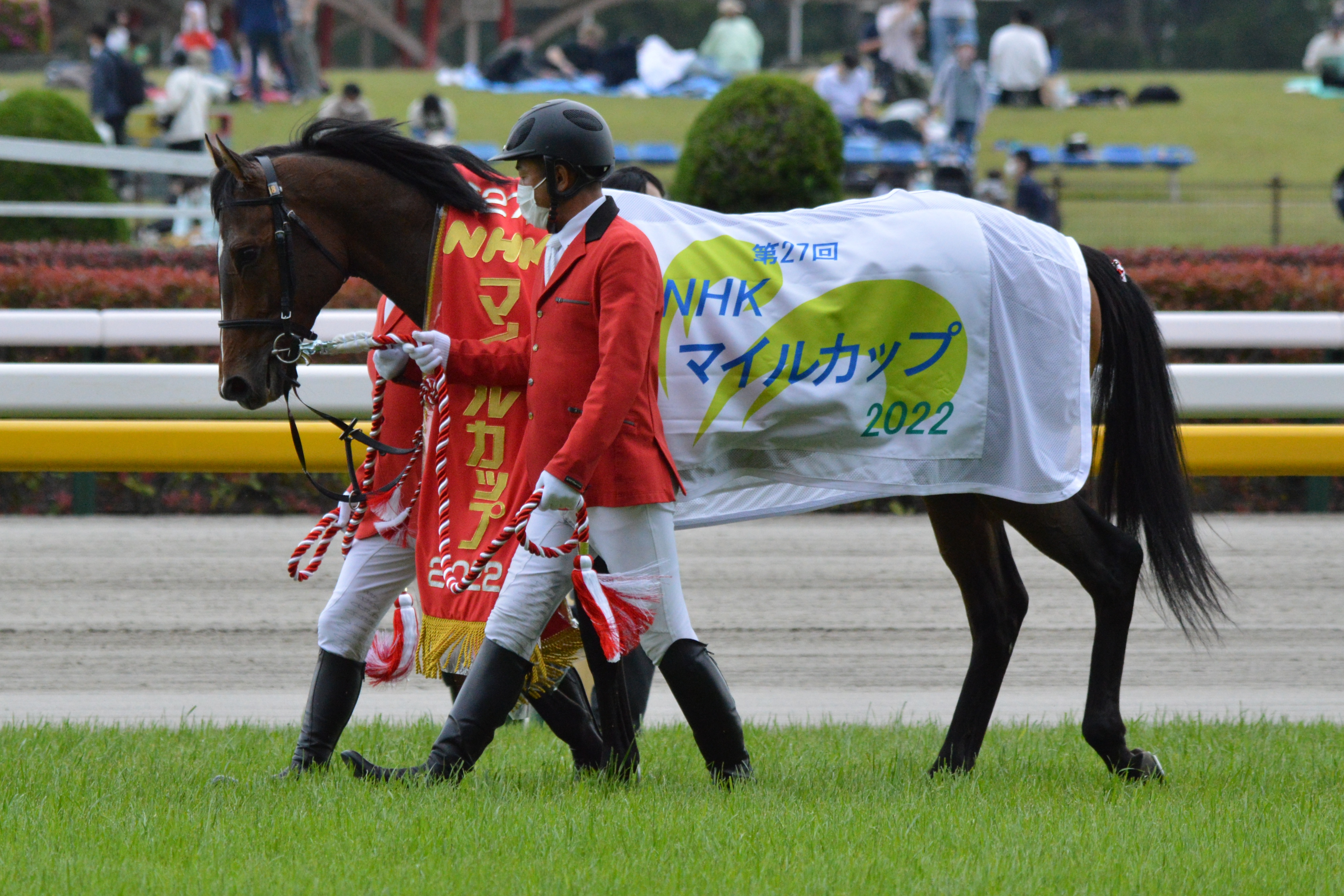
- Danon Scorpion at the 2022 NHK Mile Cup
- Sire: Lord Kanaloa
- Grandsire: King Kamehameha
- Dam: Lexie Lou
- Damsire: Sligo Bay
- Sex: Stallion
- Foaled: 22 February 2019
- Country: Japan
- Colour: Bay
- Breeder: K I Farm
- Owner: Danox Co Ltd
- Racing colours
- Trainer: Takayuki Yasuda ->Yuichi Fukunaga
- Jockey: Yuga Kawada
- Record: 26: 4-0-2
- Earnings: ¥249,652,400

Major wins
- Hagi Stakes (2021); Arlington Cup (2022); NHK Mile Cup (2022)

Danon Scorpion (Japanese: ダノンスコーピオン, Hepburn: Danon Sukōpion; foaled 22 February 2019) is a former Japanese Thoroughbred racehorse. He was one of the leading two-year-old colts in Japan in 2021 when he won his first two races including the Hagi Stakes and then ran third in the Asahi Hai Futurity Stakes. As a three-year-old he ran poorly on his seasonal debut but then recorded victories in the Arlington Cup and NHK Mile Cup.

== Background ==
Danon Scorpion is a bay horse with a narrow white blaze bred in Japan by K I Farm. During his track career he carried the red and white colours of Danox Co Ltd the business software enterprise of his owner Masahiro Noda, and was trained by Takayuki Yasuda.

He was from the first crop of foals sired by Lord Kanaloa, an outstanding sprinter-miler who was the 2013 Japanese Horse of the Year. Lord Kanaloa's other progeny include Almond Eye, Saturnalia and Tagaloa. Danon Scorpion is the second foal of his dam Lexie Lou, an outstanding Canadian racemare whose wins included the Queen's Plate and two legs of the Canadian Triple Tiara. At the 2016 Keeneland November Sale she sold for $1 million to KI Farm and after being bred to Frankel in 2017 she was exported to Japan.

== Racing career ==
=== 2021: two-year-old season ===
Danon Scorpion began his racing career in a contest for previously unraced juveniles over 1600 metres on good ground at Hanshin Racecourse on 20 June 2021. Ridden by Yuga Kawada he started the 0.3/1 favourite and won by a neck from the filly Rouge La Terre. Kawada was again in the saddle when the colt returned from a four-month break and was stepped up in class to contest the Listed Hagi Stakes over 1800 metres at Hanshin on 30 October. He started second choice in the betting and prevailed by a neck from the favourite Killer Ability after taking the lead in the straight.

On 19 December at Hanshin, Danon Scorpion was stepped up to Grade 1 class to contest Asahi Hai Futurity Stakes over 1600 metres and went off the 8.7/1 fourth choice in the betting. After settling in eighth place he made steady progress on the outside to take third place behind Do Deuce and Serifos.

In the official Japanese rankings Danon Scorpion was rated the fourth-best two-year-old of 2021, behind Do Deuce, Serifos and Killer Ability.

=== 2022: three-year-old season ===
Danon Scorpion began his second campaign in the Grade 3 Tokinominoru Kinen (a trial race for the Satsuki Sho) over 1800 metres at Tokyo Racecourse on 13 February. Ridden by Yuga Kawada he started the 4.3/1 fourth choice in the betting but came home seventh of the eleven runners behind Danon Beluga, beaten six lengths by the winner. The colt bypassed the Satsuki Sho and was dropped back in distance for the Arlington Cup over 1600 metres at Hanshin on 16 April when he started 1.5/1 favourite in an eighteen-runner field. After being settled in mid-division by Kawada he produced a sustained run on the outside in the straight, overtook the leader Taisei Divine in the final strides and won by a neck.

On 8 May at Tokyo, Danon Scorpion returned to Grade 1 class for the NHK Mile Cup in which he was partnered by Kawada and went off the 6.1/1 fourth choice in the betting behind Serifos, Industria and Matenro Orion (Shinzan Kinen). The other fourteen runners included Jean Gros (New Zealand Trophy), Purpur Ray (Falcon Stakes), King Hermes (Keio Hai Nisai Stakes) and Taisei Divine. Danon Scorpion raced on the outside in mid-division as Toshin Macau set the pace but closed on the leaders approaching the final turn. He moved up to dispute the lead in the straight, gained the advantage from Serifos 100 metres from the finish and held off the late challenge of Matenro Orion to win by a neck with the 228/1 outsider Kawakita Reverie the same distance away in third place. Kawada commented “I knew that the horses on the outside route were all coming up with a lot of force, so although I felt we had won crossing the wire, I had to be sure by watching the vision after the race. Danon Scorpion was in perhaps his best condition coming into this race so I had a lot of confidence... he was in good rhythm and balance so I had no worries.... The colt has great potential."

He started the autumn campaign with a run in the Fuji Stakes on October 22. He was in the middle of the pack and looked to catch up with the leaders as he entered the straight but was outdone by both Soul Rush and Serifos in the final phase and finished third. He targeted for the Mile Championship next. He managed to ran wide at sixth position at best before fell out and ended up in eleventh place behind the winner, Serifos. After the race, Kawada commented that "His body had grown and the balance has changed. I'll have to wait until he developed more instead." Danon Scorpion finished the season with a sixth place finish in the Hong Kong Mile, ridden by William Buick.

=== 2023 – 2025: Later seasons and retirement ===
In 2023, he started the season in the Keio Hai Spring Cup. He did not perform well as he gassed out in the final straight and finished 11th. His bad form continued for the whole 2023 when he finished in the bottom ten in every four races after that. The next year, he started the season with the same race again which was the Keio Hai Spring Cup. This year, with a change of trainer to Yuichi Fukunaga and jockeyed by Keita Tosaki this time, he ran well in the middle pack and stretched his legs well to finish in fourth place. Tosaki said after the race that Danon Scorpion might shown good signs of recovery after poor season the previous year. This did not reflected well in his next appearance on the Yasuda Kinen. He ran wide on the course, spent out most of his energy and slowed down at the end phase to finish in fifteenth place behind the first Hong Kong horse to win in Japan after 18 years, Romantic Warrior. For the rest of the year, he finished unplaced in the next four race whereas his best finish came at the Swan Stakes where he ended up in ninth place.

Danon Scorpion started poorly in the 2025 season opener as he only placed in eighth under Ryuji Wada ride in the Hankyu Hai. Due to poor string of results on the turf track, Danon Scorpion switched to dirt track for the rest of the year. This move also fail to revitalized his performance as he failed to podium in all five dirt races after the Hankyu Hai. His final race would be the Musashino Stakes, a G3 dirt mile races on Tokyo Racecourse where he finished in 11th. On the 7th of January, 2026. Danon Scorpion would retire from racing and transferred to South Africa for his stud duty. Fukunaga describe Danon Scorpion as the horse that taught him much in his time as a trainer and glad that he could be a stud despite not scoring much big results in his career. His racehorse registration also terminated by the JRA on the same day.

== Racing form ==
Danon Scorpion won four races in 26 starts. This data is available in JBIS, netkeiba and HKJC.

Date	Track	Race	Grade	Distance (Condition)	Entry	HN	Odds (Favored)	Finish	Time	Margins	Jockey	Winner (Runner-up)
2021 – two-year-old season
Jun 20	Hanshin	2yo Newcomer		1,600 m (Good)	7	7	1.3 (1)	1st	1:38.7	0.0	Yuga Kawada	(Rouge la Terre)
Oct 30	Hanshin	Hagi Stakes	L	1,800 m (Firm)	6	5	3.0 (2)	1st	1:48.5	0.0	Yuga Kawada	(Killer Ability)
Dec 19	Hanshin	Asahi Hai Futurity Stakes	1	1,600 m (Firm)	15	7	9.7 (4)	3rd	1:33.7	0.2	Kohei Matsuyama	Do Deuce
2022 – three-year-old season
Feb 13	Tokyo	Kyodo Tsushin Hai	3	1,800 m (Good)	11	11	5.3 (4)	7th	1:48.8	0.9	Yuga Kawada	Danon Beluga
Apr 16	Hanshin	Arlington Cup	3	1,600 m (Firm)	18	10	2.5 (1)	1st	1:32.7	–0.1	Yuga Kawada	(Taisei Divine)
May 8	Tokyo	NHK Mile Cup	1	1,600 m (Firm)	18	18	7.1 (4)	1st	1:32.3	0.0	Yuga Kawada	(Matenro Orion)
Oct 22	Tokyo	Fuji Stakes	2	1,600 m (Firm)	15	14	3.6 (2)	3rd	1:32.1	0.1	Yuga Kawada	Serifos
Nov 20	Hanshin	Mile Championship	1	1,600 m (Firm)	17	15	7.3 (4)	11th	1:33.3	0.8	Yuga Kawada	Serifos
Dec 11	Sha Tin	Hong Kong Mile	1	1,600 m (Firm)	9	10	10.2 (4)	6th	1:34.8	1.4	William Buick	California Spangle
2023 – four-year-old season
May 13	Tokyo	Keio Hai Spring Cup	2	1,400 m (Firm)	18	1	3.6 (1)	11th	1:20.8	0.5	Yuga Kawada	Red Mon Reve
Jun 4	Tokyo	Yasuda Kinen	1	1,600 m (Firm)	18	6	67.1 (14)	13th	1:32.4	1.0	Mirco Demuro	Songline
Jul 23	Chukyo	Chukyo Kinen	3	1,600 m (Firm)	16	12	9.1 (4)	12th	1:34.2	1.2	Kazuo Yokoyama	Selberg
Nov 19	Kyoto	Mile Championship	1	1,600 m (Firm)	16	3	191.8 (15)	13th	1:34.0	1.5	Taisei Danno	Namur
Dec 23	Hanshin	Hanshin Cup	2	1,400 m (Firm)	17	1	81.1 (12)	13th	1:20.0	0.7	Taisei Danno	Win Marvel
2024 – five-year-old season
May 11	Tokyo	Keio Hai Spring Cup	2	1,400 m (Firm)	15	9	18.6 (6)	4th	1:20.2	0.5	Keita Tosaki	Win Marvel
Jun 2	Tokyo	Yasuda Kinen	1	1,600 m (Good)	18	18	36.9 (11)	15th	1:33.6	1.3	Keita Tosaki	Romantic Warrior
Sep 8	Chukyo	Centaur Stakes	2	1,200 m (Firm)	18	14	9.0 (5)	12th	1:08.3	0.6	Keita Tosaki	Toshin Macau
Sep 29	Nakayama	Sprinters Stakes	1	1,200 m (Firm)	16	11	158.7 (16)	15th	1:07.8	0.8	Keita Tosaki	Lugal
Oct 26	Kyoto	Swan Stakes	2	1,400 m (Firm)	17	12	31.6 (11)	9th	1:20.9	0.4	Andrasch Starke	Danon McKinley
Dec 21	Hanshin	Hanshin Cup	2	1,400 m (Firm)	18	2	120.4 (14)	10th	1:20.6	0.5	Taisei Danno	Namura Clair
2025 – six-year-old season
Feb 22	Kyoto	Hankyu Hai	3	1,400 m (Firm)	18	15	58.0 (13)	8th	1:22.1	0.4	Ryuji Wada	Kanchenjunga
Mar 30	Nakayama	March Stakes	3	1,800 m (Good)	15	11	72.9 (13)	8th	1:52.4	0.9	Takuya Ono	Brian Sense
Apr 16	Oi	Tokyo Sprint Race	JPN3	1,200 m (Good)	15	9	20.3 (6)	6th	1:11.6	0.3	Tsubasa Sasagawa	A Tracks
Jul 27	Chukyo	Tokai Stakes	3	1,400 m (Fast)	16	6	56.0 (12)	9th	1:24.0	1.8	Hideaki Miyuki	Yamanin Ours
Aug 11	Morioka	Cluster Cup	JPN3	1,200 m (Good)	14	9	15.7 (4)	5th	1:10.6	1.4	Toshiya Yamamoto	Sunrise Amour
Nov 15	Tokyo	Musashino Stakes	3	1,600 m (Fast)	16	10	139.8 (14)	11th	1:36.4	1.2	Ryoya Kozaki	Luxor Cafe

Legend:
Turf Dirt

== Pedigree ==
Pedigree of Danon Scorpion (JPN), bay colt, 2019
Sire Lord Kanaloa (JPN) 2008	King Kamehameha (JPN); 2001	Kingmambo (USA)	Mr Prospector
Sire Lord Kanaloa (JPN) 2008	King Kamehameha (JPN); 2001	Kingmambo (USA)	Miesque
Sire Lord Kanaloa (JPN) 2008	King Kamehameha (JPN); 2001	Manfath (IRE)	Last Tycoon
Sire Lord Kanaloa (JPN) 2008	King Kamehameha (JPN); 2001	Manfath (IRE)	Pilot Bird (GB)
Sire Lord Kanaloa (JPN) 2008	Lady Blossom (JPN); 1996	Storm Cat (USA)	Storm Bird (CAN)
Sire Lord Kanaloa (JPN) 2008	Lady Blossom (JPN); 1996	Storm Cat (USA)	Terlingua
Sire Lord Kanaloa (JPN) 2008	Lady Blossom (JPN); 1996	Saratoga Dew (USA)	Cormorant
Sire Lord Kanaloa (JPN) 2008	Lady Blossom (JPN); 1996	Saratoga Dew (USA)	Super Luna
Dam Lexie Lou (CAN) 2011	Sligo Bay (IRE); 1998	Sadler's Wells (USA)	Northern Dancer (CAN)
Dam Lexie Lou (CAN) 2011	Sligo Bay (IRE); 1998	Sadler's Wells (USA)	Fairy Bridge
Dam Lexie Lou (CAN) 2011	Sligo Bay (IRE); 1998	Angelic Song (CAN)	Halo (USA)
Dam Lexie Lou (CAN) 2011	Sligo Bay (IRE); 1998	Angelic Song (CAN)	Ballade (USA)
Dam Lexie Lou (CAN) 2011	Oneexcessivenite (USA); 2000	In Excess (IRE)	Siberian Express (USA)
Dam Lexie Lou (CAN) 2011	Oneexcessivenite (USA); 2000	In Excess (IRE)	Kantado
Dam Lexie Lou (CAN) 2011	Oneexcessivenite (USA); 2000	Favored One	Son of Briarctic
Dam Lexie Lou (CAN) 2011	Oneexcessivenite (USA); 2000	Favored One	Highly Favored (Family: 9-f)
