= Circle of Life (horse) =

Japanese Thoroughbred racehorse

Circle of Life; サークルオブライフ
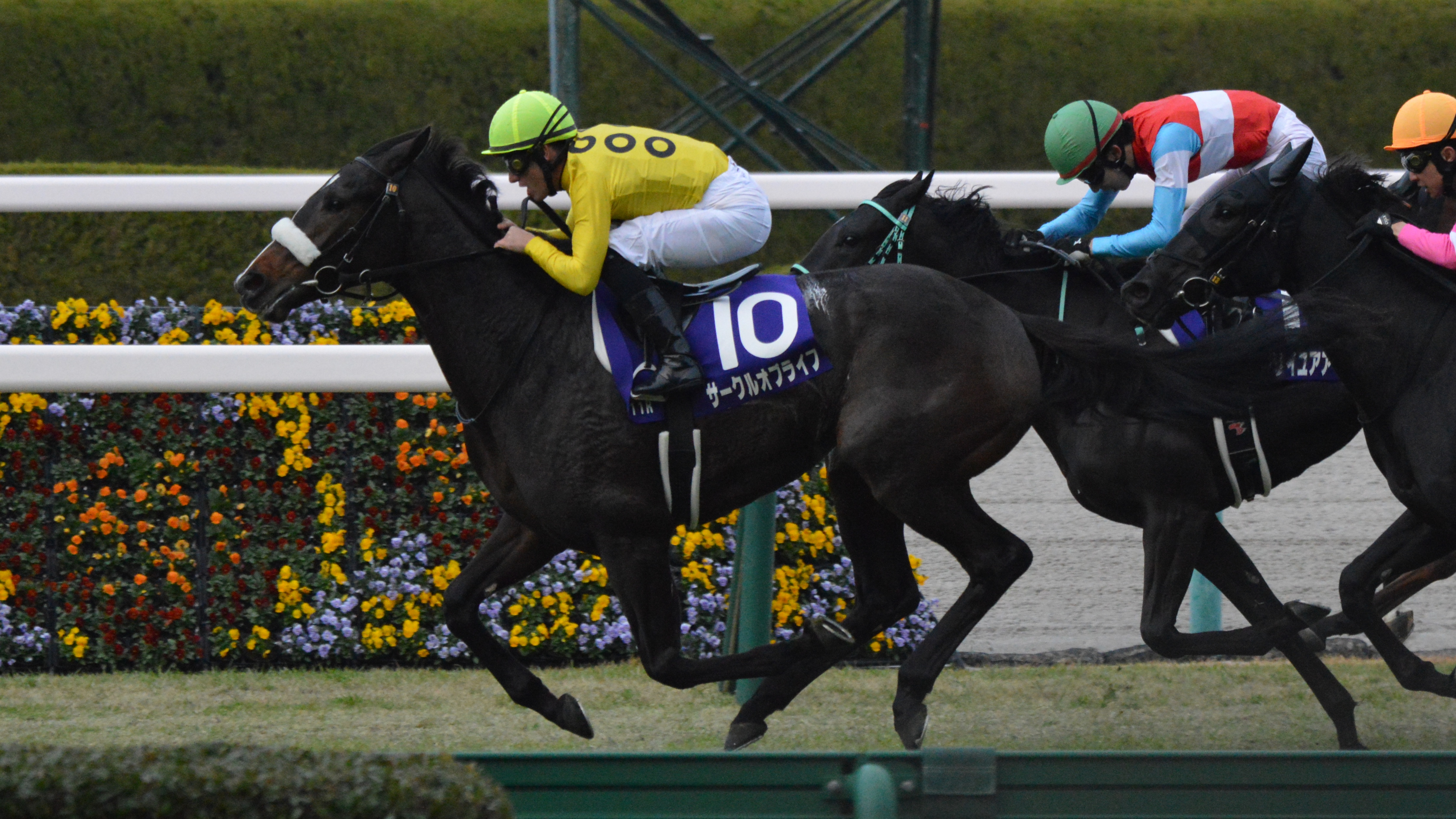
- Circle of Life at the Hanshin Juvenile Fillies
- Sire: Epiphaneia
- Grandsire: Symboli Kris S
- Dam: Sea Breeze Life
- Damsire: Admire Japan
- Sex: Mare
- Foaled: 24 March 2019
- Country: Japan
- Colour: Bay
- Breeder: Chiyoda Farm Shizunai
- Owner: Masatake Iida
- Racing colours
- Trainer: Sakae Kunieda
- Jockey: Mirco Demuro
- Record: 8: 3-0-2
- Earnings: ¥141,325,000

Major wins
- Artemis Stakes (2021); Hanshin Juvenile Fillies (2021)

Awards
- JRA Award for Best Two-Year-Old Filly (2021)
- Last updated on 11 January 2026

Circle of Life (Japanese: サークルオブライフ, foaled 24 March 2019) is a retired Japanese Thoroughbred racehorse. She was one of the best two-year-olds in Japan in 2021 when she won three of her four races including the Artemis Stakes and the Hanshin Juvenile Fillies.

== Background ==
Circle of Life is a bay filly with a white blaze bred in Japan by Chiyoda Farm Shizunai. During her racing career she was trained by Sakae Kunieda and raced in the yellow and black colours of Chiyoda Farm's owner Masatake Iida.

He was from the third crop of foals sired by Epiphaneia who won the Kikuka Sho and the Japan Cup and was rated the second-best horse in the world in 2014. His other foals have included Daring Tact and Efforia. Circle of Life's dam Sea Breeze Life showed good ability on the track, winning three of her sixteen races including the Crocus Stakes. Her grand-dam Star My Life was a half-sister to Lady's Secret.

== Racing career ==
=== 2021: two-year-old season ===
Circle of Life began her racing career in a contest for previously unraced juveniles over 1800 metres on good to firm ground at Niigata Racecourse on 28 August 2021. Ridden by Mirco Demuro she started the 6.1/1 fourth choice in the betting and finished third behind the colts Equinox and Men At Work. Demuro was again in the saddle when the filly started 7.5/1 third favourite for a maiden race for fillies over 1600 metres at Nakayama Racecourse on 20 September and recorded her first success as she came from the rear of the field to take the lead early in the straight and won by two and half lengths from Nishino Love Wink. Circle of Life was then stepped up in class and started a 20.9/1 outsider for the Grade 3 Artemis Stakes over 1600 metres at Tokyo Racecourse on 30 October. After being settled towards the rear of the field in the early stages by Demuro she produced a sustained run down the centre of the straight and got up in the final strides to win by a neck from Belle Cresta. Her trainer Sakae Kunieda commented "She broke well and went with the flow, then in the stretch showed some very sharp footwork".

On 12 December at Hanshin Racecourse, Circle of Life was promoted to the highest level to contest the Grade 1 Hanshin Juvenile Fillies over 1600 metres and went off the 4.6/1 second choice in the betting behind Namur and Sternatia in an eighteen-runner field which also included Belle Cresta, Water Navillera (winner of the Fantasy Stakes) and Namura Clair (Kokura Nisai Stakes). Circle of Life raced in mid-division for most of the way but was only tenth of the eighteen runners as the field turned into the straight. She was switched to the wide outside by Demuro and produced a strong late charge, taking the lead from Water Navillera 50 metres from the finish and winning by half a length from Lovely Your Eyes. After the race Demuro commented “She was great today, she had a good break, and we had a smooth trip. We went wide at the stretch but the track was really good on the outside. My filly was closed well over the smooth track so I trusted her to make it and indeed she exhibited strong finishing speed. I was certain in the last 200 meters that she would win. I’ve ridden her since her debut and she really takes it in her stride in new surroundings and unfamiliar tracks so she has plenty of energy to use in the race. I’m sure she can further extend her distance in future races so I’m really looking forward that too".

In January 2022, at the JRA Awards, Circle of Life was named the Best Two-Year-Old Filly of 2021, taking 294 of the 296 votes. In the official Japanese rankings Circle of Life was rated the best two-year-old filly of 2021, four pounds behind the top-rated colt Do Deuce.

=== 2022: three-year-old season ===
On her first appearance as a three-year-old Circle of Life started the 2.3/1 second choice in the betting for the Tulip Sho over 1600 metres at Hanshin Racecourse on 5 March. She raced closer to the lead that usual before coming home third, beaten just under two lengths by the winning favourite Namur. Kunieda commented "she wasn’t in bad shape, but she was a bit more high-strung than usual". In the Grade 1 Oka Sho she was restrained by Demuro before producing a strong late run on the outside and finishing fourth behind Stars On Earth, beaten less than a length by the winner in a bunched finish.

After coming in 4th place at the Shion Stakes, Circle of Life was forced to take a prolonged break due to tendinitis. She never returned to racing, and her retirement was officially announced on October 12, 2023, to become a broodmare.

== Racing form ==
Circle of Life won three races out of eight starts. The data available is based on JBIS and netkeiba.

Date	Track	Race	Grade	Distance (Condition)	Entry	HN	Odds (Favored)	Finish	Time	Margins	Jockey	Winner (Runner-up)
2021 – two-year-old season
Aug 28	Niigata	2yo debut		1,800m (Firm)	15	6	7.1 (4)	3rd	1:48.6	1.2	Mirco Demuro	Equinox
Sep 20	Nakayama	2yo maiden		1,600m (Firm)	15	1	8.5 (3)	1st	1:35.4	–0.4	Mirco Demuro	(Nishino Love Wink)
Oct 30	Tokyo	Artemis Stakes	3	1,600m (Firm)	11	7	21.9 (7)	1st	1:34.0	0.0	Mirco Demuro	(Belle Cresta)
Dec 12	Hanshin	Hanshin Juvenile Fillies	1	1,600m (Firm)	18	10	5.6 (3)	1st	1:33.8	–0.1	Mirco Demuro	(Lovely Your Eyes)
2022 – three-year-old season
Mar 5	Hanshin	Tulip Sho	2	1,600m (Firm)	15	3	3.3 (2)	3rd	1:33.4	0.2	Mirco Demuro	Namur
Apr 10	Hanshin	Oka Sho	1	1,600m (Firm)	18	16	5.1 (2)	4th	1:33.0	0.1	Mirco Demuro	Stars on Earth
May 22	Tokyo	Yushun Himba	1	2,400m (Firm)	17	6	3.2 (1)	12th	2:25.8	1.9	Mirco Demuro	Stars on Earth
Sep 10	Nakayama	Shion Stakes	3	2,000m (Firm)	12	2	6.0 (3)	4th	2:00.1	0.2	Mirco Demuro	Stunning Rose

Legend:
Turf

== Pedigree ==
Pedigree of Circle of Life (JPN), bay filly, 2019
Sire Epiphaneia (JPN) 2010	Symboli Kris S (USA); 1999	Kris S	Roberto
Sire Epiphaneia (JPN) 2010	Symboli Kris S (USA); 1999	Kris S	Sharp Queen
Sire Epiphaneia (JPN) 2010	Symboli Kris S (USA); 1999	Tee Kay	Gold Meridian
Sire Epiphaneia (JPN) 2010	Symboli Kris S (USA); 1999	Tee Kay	Tri Argo
Sire Epiphaneia (JPN) 2010	Cesario (JPN); 2002	Special Week	Sunday Silence (USA)
Sire Epiphaneia (JPN) 2010	Cesario (JPN); 2002	Special Week	Campaign Girl
Sire Epiphaneia (JPN) 2010	Cesario (JPN); 2002	Kirov Premiere (GB)	Sadler's Wells (USA)
Sire Epiphaneia (JPN) 2010	Cesario (JPN); 2002	Kirov Premiere (GB)	Querida (IRE)
Dam Sea Breeze Life (JPN) 2010	Admire Japan (JPN); 2002	Sunday Silence (USA)	Halo
Dam Sea Breeze Life (JPN) 2010	Admire Japan (JPN); 2002	Sunday Silence (USA)	Wishing Well
Dam Sea Breeze Life (JPN) 2010	Admire Japan (JPN); 2002	Biwa Heidi	Caerleon (USA)
Dam Sea Breeze Life (JPN) 2010	Admire Japan (JPN); 2002	Biwa Heidi	Aghsan (IRE)
Dam Sea Breeze Life (JPN) 2010	Precious Life (JPN); 2001	Taiki Shuttle (USA)	Devil's Bag
Dam Sea Breeze Life (JPN) 2010	Precious Life (JPN); 2001	Taiki Shuttle (USA)	Welsh Muffin (IRE)
Dam Sea Breeze Life (JPN) 2010	Precious Life (JPN); 2001	Star My Life (USA)	Storm Cat
Dam Sea Breeze Life (JPN) 2010	Precious Life (JPN); 2001	Star My Life (USA)	Great Lady M (Family: 22-d)

- Circle of Life was inbred 3 × 4 to Sunday Silence, meaning that this stallion appears in both the third and fourth generations of her pedigree.
