= Stunning Rose =

Japanese-bred Thoroughbred racehorse

Stunning Rose スタニングローズ
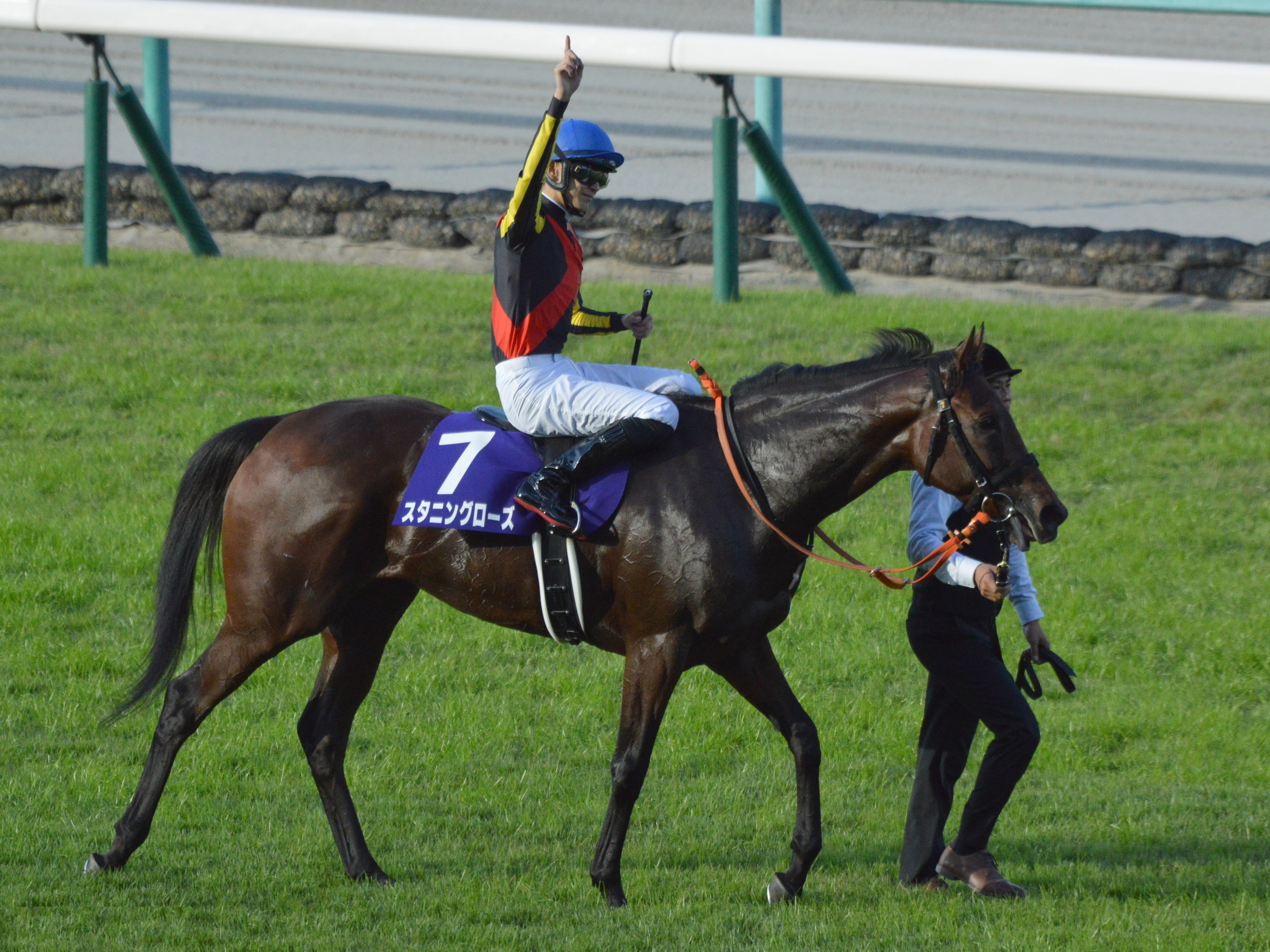
- Stunning Rose at the Shuka Sho
- Breed: Thoroughbred
- Sire: King Kamehameha
- Grandsire: Kingmambo
- Dam: Rosa Blanca
- Damsire: Kurofune
- Sex: Mare
- Foaled: January 18, 2019 (age 7)
- Color: Bay
- Breeder: Northern Farm
- Owner: Sunday Racing
- Racing colors
- Trainer: Tomokazu Takano
- Jockey: Ryusei Sakai
- Record: 18: 6-2-1
- Earnings: ¥426,216,000

Major wins
- Flower Cup (2022); Shion Stakes (2022); Queen Elizabeth II Cup (2024); Japanese Classic Tiara Race wins: Shuka Sho (2022)

Awards
- JRA Award for Best Older Filly or Mare (2024)
- Last updated on January 8, 2025

Stunning Rose (Japanese: スタニングローズ, Hepburn: Sutaningu Rōzu; January 18, 2019) is a retired Japanese thoroughbred racehorse. Her major wins include the 2022 Shūka Sho and the 2024 Queen Elizabeth II Cup. She was the recipient of the JRA Award for Best Older Filly or Mare in 2024.

== Racing career ==
=== 2021: two-year-old season ===
Stunning Rose made her debut on a debut race for two year olds held at Chukyo Racecourse on June 6 held over a distance of 1400 meters, where she lost to Breathlessly and finished second. She would go on to have her first victory on June 26 at a 1600 meter long maiden race held at Hanshin Racecourse, where she won by two and a half length lead. Later she ran in several graded races in the season, without winning in any.

=== 2022: three-year-old season ===
Stunning Rose started the season off with the Kobushi Sho held on February 13, where she was the most favored to win. She placed herself in the middle of the pack for most of the race before making a pass, catching front-runner Seiun Hades and winning by a head. At the Flower Cup held on March 21, she was able to keep her pace among the pack, before passing Nishino Love Wink just before the finishing line and scoring her first graded race victory. She was the last crop of her sire, King Kamehameha, and with that victory he achieved producing a grade winning crop in all fourteen generations.

After winning the Flower Cup, she did not head to the Oka Sho, but headed straight to the Oaks following a brief break. As she headed straight to the Oaks without running the Oka Sho, she was only the 10th most favored to win at that race. However, she ran a good position and overtook the lead on the final stretch, only to be passed at the last second by Stars on Earth, finishing second.

After taking a break for the summer, she was entered in to the Shion Stakes, which is a trial race for the Shuka Sho. Although she gained 14 kilograms since her last race, she was nonetheless the most favored to win, with the parimutuel odds of her at 2.8. She won the race after swiftly coming through the pack, earning her a slot in the Shuka Sho.

At the Shuka Sho, she was placed in the middle of the pack, and moved up as the pack entered the final stretch. She managed to shake off Double Crown winner Stars on Earth and Namur, who finished third at the Oaks, and won her first Grade I race. This was also the first Grade I win for her jockey, Ryusei Sakai, and the first time her trainer Takano won a Grade I race since Lei Papale in the previous year's Osaka Hai, and the first time winning the Shuka Sho since Shonan Pandora in 2014.

On November 13, she was entered in to the Queen Elizabeth II Cup as her last race of the year. She was the second most favored to win behind Daring Tact. She made a decent start and was among the middle pack, but failed to keep up beyond that and finished at 14th place.

=== 2023: four-year-old season ===
Stunning Rose started her four year old season at the Nakayama Kinen, where she managed to run at third place, but was not able to keep up and finished 5th with a 0.2 second gap behind the winner. She also finished 12th at the Victoria Mile, and after that race it was discovered that the horse developed Peritendinitis on her left forearm, forcing her out of racing.

=== 2024: five-year-old season ===
Stunning Rose returned to racing after a 10-month break at the Osaka Hai in March. She was able to make headway for most of the race, but lost momentum and finished at 8th place. She then went on to finish 9th at the Victoria Mile and 6th at the Queen Stakes. On November 10, Stunning Rose was entered into the Queen Elizabeth II Cup, the same race where she lost at 14th place. She ran most of the race around fourth place, before catching up with the front runners at around the fourth corner. On the final stretch she overtook and kept the momentum, winning her second Grade I race since the Shuka Sho.

It was decided that her final race would be the Arima Kinen in December. Her trainer, Takano, was optimistic that the horse would be able to handle the distance on the day. For this race, she teamed up with Ryan Moore and maintained a good position throughout the race, conserving her energy and making a great effort to close the gap in the final straight, but was defeated by Regaleira, finishing eighth and unable to cap off her retirement race with a victory. In the post race interview, Takano said the horse did her best and hoped she became a great broodmare in the future. Four days after the race, she was deregistered from racing and assigned to broodmare duty at Northern Farm. In her final season, she was awarded as the best older filly or mare of the year by JRA.

== Racing form ==
The following racing form is based on information available on netkeiba and JBIS.

Date	Track	Race	Grade	Distance (condition)	Entry	HN	Odds (Favored)	Finish	Time	Margins	Jockey	Winner (Runner-up)
2021 – two-year-old season
Jun 6	Chukyo	Debut Race		1400 m (Firm)	13	11	1.9 (1)	2nd	1:23.3	0.2	Hayato Yoshida	Breathlessly
Jun 26	Hanshin	Maiden Race		1600 m (Firm)	10	9	2.0 (1)	1st	1:35.2	-0.4	Yuga Kawada	(Chronicle Nova)
Aug 29	Niigata	Niigata Nisai Stakes	GIII	1600 m (Firm)	12	5	12.1 (5)	5th	1:34.3	0.5	Kohei Matsuyama	Serifos
Oct 9	Tokyo	Saudi Arabia Royal Cup	GIII	1600 m (Firm)	7	1	5.4 (3)	3rd	1:36.5	0.1	Keita Tosaki	Command Line
Nov 13	Hanshin	Daily Hai Nisai Stakes	GII	1600 m (Firm)	7	2	7.3 (4)	5th	1:35.6	0.5	Yasunari Iwata	Serifos
2022 – three-year-old season
Feb 13	Hanshin	Kobushi Sho	1-win	1600 m (Good)	6	5	1.7 (1)	1st	1:36.9	0.0	Ryusei Sakai	(Seiun Hades)
Mar 21	Nakayama	Flower Cup	GIII	1800 m (Firm)	12	1	4.4 (2)	1st	1:48.5	-0.1	Yuga Kawada	(Nishino Love Wink)
May 22	Tokyo	Yushun Himba	GI	2400 m (Firm)	17	2	28.2 (10)	2nd	2:24.1	0.2	Damian Lane	Stars on Earth
Sept 10	Nakayama	Shion Stakes	GIII	2000 m (Firm)	12	8	2.8 (1)	1st	1:58.6	0.0	Ryusei Sakai	(Sound Vivace)
Oct 16	Hanshin	Shuka Sho	GI	2000 m (Firm)	16	4	5.7 (3)	1st	1:58.6	-0.1	Ryusei Sakai	(Namur)
Nov 13	Hanshin	Queen Elizabeth II Cup	GI	2200 m (Soft)	18	5	5.7 (2)	14th	2:15.5	2.5	Ryusei Sakai	Geraldina
2023 – four-year-old season
Feb 26	Nakayama	Nakayama Kinen	GII	1800 m (Firm)	14	12	7.8 (3)	5th	1:47.3	0.2	Hayato Yoshida	Hishi Iguazu
May 14	Tokyo	Victoria Mile	GI	1600 m (Firm)	16	5	25.4 (7)	12th	1:33.0	0.8	Ryusei Sakai	Songline
2024 – five-year-old season
Mar 31	Hanshin	Osaka Hai	GI	2000 m (Firm)	16	3	12.5 (6)	8th	1:58.7	0.5	Atsuya Nishimura	Bellagio Opera
May 12	Tokyo	Victoria Mile	GI	1600 m (Firm)	15	2	17.8 (5)	9th	1:32.6	0.8	Atsuya Nishimura	Ten Happy Rose
Jul 28	Sapporo	Queen Stakes	GIII	1800 m (Good)	14	9	13.8 (9)	6th	1:47.6	0.2	Yuichi Kitamura	Koganeno Sora
Nov 10	Kyoto	Queen Elizabeth II Cup	GI	2200 m (Firm)	17	11	9.5 (3)	1st	2:11.1	-0.4	Cristian Demuro	(Ravel)
Dec 22	Nakayama	Arima Kinen	GI	2500 m (Firm)	16	13	27.1 (9)	8th	2:32.4	0.6	Ryan Moore	Regaleira

== Pedigree ==
Pedigree of Stunning Rose
Sire King Kamehameha b. 2001	Kingmambo b. 1990	Mr. Prospector	Raise a Native
Sire King Kamehameha b. 2001	Kingmambo b. 1990	Mr. Prospector	Gold Digger
Sire King Kamehameha b. 2001	Kingmambo b. 1990	Miesque	Nureyev
Sire King Kamehameha b. 2001	Kingmambo b. 1990	Miesque	Pasadoble
Sire King Kamehameha b. 2001	Manfath dk. b. 1991	Last Tycoon	Try My Best
Sire King Kamehameha b. 2001	Manfath dk. b. 1991	Last Tycoon	Mill Princess
Sire King Kamehameha b. 2001	Manfath dk. b. 1991	Pilot Bird	Blakeney
Sire King Kamehameha b. 2001	Manfath dk. b. 1991	Pilot Bird	The Dancer
Dam Rosa Blanca gr. 2005	Kurofune gr. 1998	French Deputy	Deputy Minister
Dam Rosa Blanca gr. 2005	Kurofune gr. 1998	French Deputy	Mitterand
Dam Rosa Blanca gr. 2005	Kurofune gr. 1998	Blue Avenue	Classic Go Go
Dam Rosa Blanca gr. 2005	Kurofune gr. 1998	Blue Avenue	Eliza Blue
Dam Rosa Blanca gr. 2005	Rosebud blk. 1998	Sunday Silence	Halo
Dam Rosa Blanca gr. 2005	Rosebud blk. 1998	Sunday Silence	Wishing Well
Dam Rosa Blanca gr. 2005	Rosebud blk. 1998	Rose Colour	Shirley Heights
Dam Rosa Blanca gr. 2005	Rosebud blk. 1998	Rose Colour	Rosa Nay

- Stunning Rose's granddam, Rosebud, won the Fillies' Revue and Mermaid Stakes in her career, only to finish second in the Oaks, Shuka Sho, and the Queen Elizabeth II Cup in 2001. Her great-granddam, Rose Colour, won the Daily Hai Sansai Stakes in 1995 and finished 4th at the Oaks and 3rd at the Shuka Sho.
