= Namur (horse) =

Japanese Thoroughbred racehorse (foaled 2019)

Namur; ナミュール
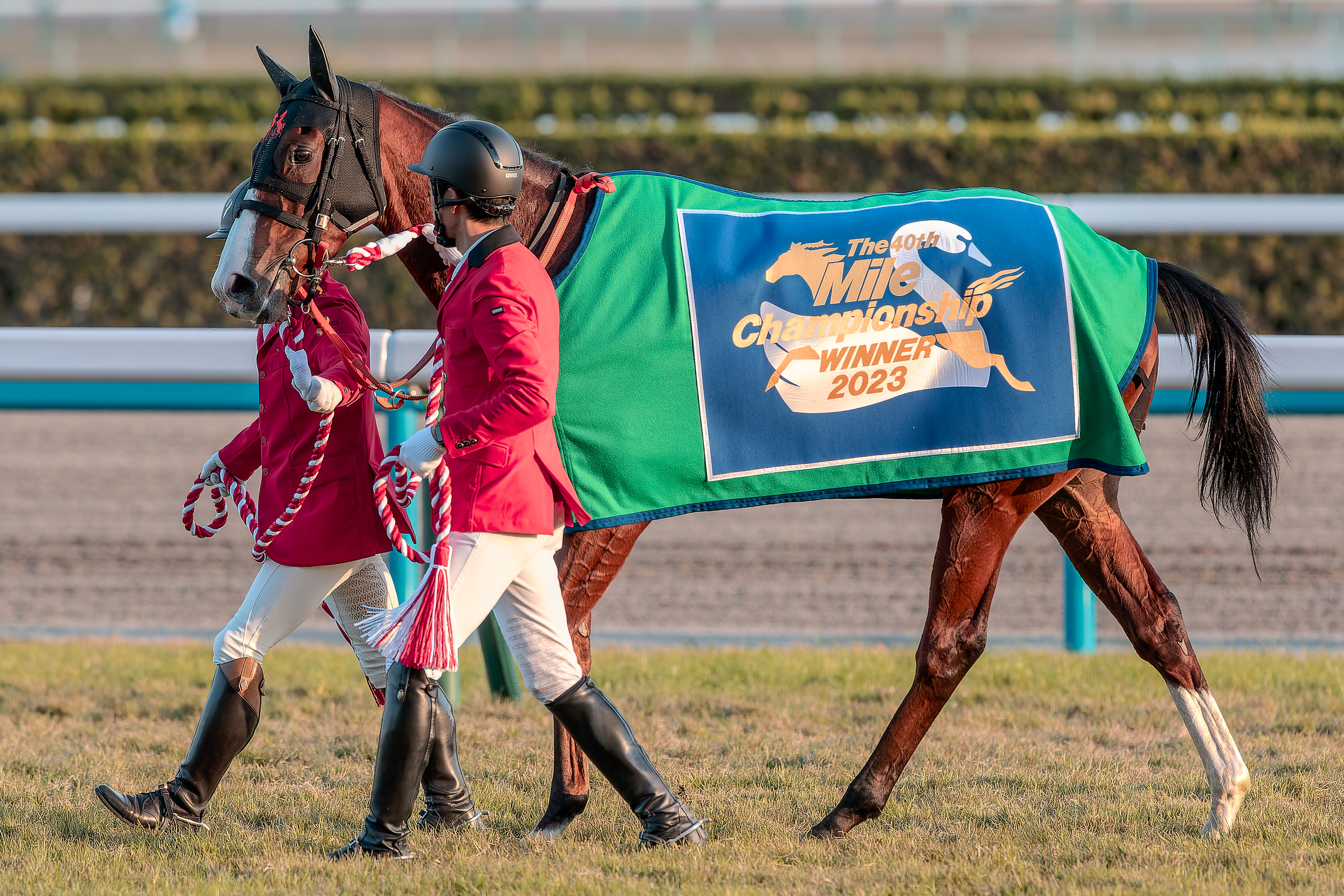
- Namur at the 2023 Mile Championship
- Breed: Thoroughbred
- Sire: Harbinger
- Grandsire: Dansili
- Dam: Sambre et Meuse
- Damsire: Daiwa Major
- Sex: Mare
- Foaled: 2 March 2019 (age 7)
- Country: Japan
- Colour: Bay
- Breeder: Northern Farm
- Owner: Carrot Farm
- Racing colours
- Trainer: Tomokazu Takano
- Jockey: Yuga Kawada; Kota Fujioka; Yutaka Take
- Record: 18: 5-4-2
- Earnings: ¥713,273,100

Major wins
- Tulip Sho (2022); Fuji Stakes (2023); Mile Championship (2023)

Namur (Japanese: ナミュール, Namyūru; foaled 2 March 2019) is a retired Japanese Thoroughbred racehorse. She competed from 2021 to 2024, recording five wins from eighteen starts, including the Mile Championship (GI) in 2023, the Fuji Stakes (GII) in 2023, and the Tulip Sho (GII) in 2022. She also finished second in the Shuka Shō (GI) in 2022, second in the Yasuda Kinen (GI) in 2024, and third in the Yūshun Himba (GI) in 2022. Her name refers to the Belgian city of Namur, where the Sambre and Meuse rivers converge, chosen in association with her dam's name.

== Background ==
Namur is a bay filly bred in Abira, Hokkaido, by Northern Farm. She was sired by Harbinger, a British-bred stallion by Dansili, and her dam was Sambre et Meuse (サンブルエミューズ), a mare by Daiwa Major. She is owned by Carrot Farm and was trained by Tomokazu Takano at the JRA's Ritto Training Center. Her half-sister Ravel (ラヴェル) won the Artemis Stakes in 2022 and the Challenge Cup in 2024.

== Racing career ==
=== 2021: two-year-old season ===
Namur debuted on 11 September 2021 in a maiden race at Chukyo Racecourse, winning by 0.3 seconds. She won the Akamatsu Sho (1-win class) at Tokyo Racecourse on 21 November. She finished fourth in the Hanshin Juvenile Fillies (GI) at Hanshin Racecourse on 12 December.

=== 2022: three-year-old season ===
Namur won the Tulip Sho (GII) at Hanshin on 5 March, recording her first graded stakes victory. She finished tenth in the Oka Shō (GI) on 10 April and third in the Yūshun Himba (GI) at Tokyo on 22 May. She finished second in the Shuka Shō (GI) at Hanshin on 16 October, beaten 0.1 seconds by Stunning Rose. She finished fifth in the Queen Elizabeth II Cup (GI) on 13 November.

=== 2023: four-year-old season ===
Namur finished second in the Tokyo Shimbun Hai (GIII) on 5 February, seventh in the Victoria Mile (GI) on 14 May, and sixteenth in the Yasuda Kinen (GI) on 4 June. On 21 October, she won her first race in over a year and a half when she won the Fuji Stakes (GII) with João Moreira as her jockey.

On 19 November, she was entered in to the Mile Championship (GI) at Kyoto Racecourse. She was initially supposed to be ridden by Ryan Moore but, following an injury to his back he sustained from a fall earlier that day, Kota Fujioka took over as a last minute replacement. The horse wound up starting from behind but after showing tremendous turn of foot, managed to catch up and overtake Soul Rush just before the finish line, clinching her first GI victory. This was also a significant victory for Fujioka, who had not won a single GI race since he won the NHK Mile Cup in 2009 with Jo Cappuccino in 2009.

She would then go on to finish third in the Hong Kong Mile (G1) at Sha Tin Racecourse on 10 December.

=== 2024: five-year-old season ===
Namur finished second in the Dubai Turf (G1) at Meydan Racecourse on 30 March. She finished eighth in the Victoria Mile (GI) on 12 May and second in the Yasuda Kinen (GI) on 2 June, beaten 0.1 seconds by Romantic Warrior. She finished seventeenth in the Mile Championship (GI) on 17 November after the jockey dismounted post-race due to a gait abnormality. She was retired on 22 November 2024 and entered stud at Northern Farm.

== Statistics ==
The following table details all 18 starts of Namur's racing career. Record current as of 17 November 2024.

Date	Distance (Condition)	Race	Class	Course	Odds (Favourite)	Field	Finish	Time	Jockey	Winning (Losing) Margin	Winner (2nd Place)	Ref
2021 – two-year-old season
Sep 11	Turf 1600 m (Good)	2-Y-O Newcomer	Maiden	Chukyo	3.0 (2nd)	10	1st	1:39.0	Yuga Kawada	–0.3	(Squall Universe)	
Nov 21	Turf 1600 m (Good)	Akamatsu Sho	Allowance	Tokyo	8.0 (4th)	9	1st	1:33.8	Kosei Miura	–0.3	(Personal High)	
Dec 12	Turf 1600 m (Good)	Hanshin Juvenile Fillies	GI	Hanshin	2.9 (1st)	18	4th	1:34.0	Cristian Demuro	0.2	Circle of Life	
2022 – three-year-old season
Mar 5	Turf 1600 m (Good)	Tulip Sho	GII	Hanshin	2.2 (1st)	15	1st	1:33.2	Takeshi Yokoyama	–0.2	(Pin High)	
Apr 10	Turf 1600 m (Good)	Oka Shō	GI	Hanshin	3.2 (1st)	18	10th	1:33.2	Takeshi Yokoyama	0.3	Stars on Earth	
May 22	Turf 2400 m (Good)	Yūshun Himba	GI	Tokyo	7.1 (4th)	17	3rd	2:24.3	Takeshi Yokoyama	0.4	Stars on Earth	
Oct 16	Turf 2000 m (Good)	Shuka Shō	GI	Hanshin	3.3 (2nd)	16	2nd	1:58.7	Takeshi Yokoyama	0.1	Stunning Rose	
Nov 13	Turf 2200 m (Heavy)	Queen Elizabeth II Cup	GI	Hanshin	7.3 (3rd)	18	5th	2:13.7	Takeshi Yokoyama	0.7	Geraldina	
2023 – four-year-old season
Feb 5	Turf 1600 m (Good)	Tokyo Shimbun Hai	GIII	Tokyo	3.7 (2nd)	16	2nd	1:31.8	Takeshi Yokoyama	0.0	Win Carnelian	
May 14	Turf 1600 m (Good)	Victoria Mile	GI	Tokyo	4.2 (2nd)	16	7th	1:32.8	Takeshi Yokoyama	0.6	Songline	
Jun 4	Turf 1600 m (Good)	Yasuda Kinen	GI	Tokyo	29.9 (9th)	18	16th	1:33.3	Takeshi Yokoyama	1.9	Songline	
Oct 21	Turf 1600 m (Good)	Fuji Stakes	GII	Tokyo	3.8 (1st)	12	1st	1:31.4	João Moreira	–0.2	(Red Mon Reve)	
Nov 19	Turf 1600 m (Good)	Mile Championship	GI	Kyoto	17.3 (5th)	16	1st	1:32.5	Kota Fujioka	0.0	(Soul Rush)	
Dec 10	Turf 1600 m (Good)	Hong Kong Mile	G1	Sha Tin	13.0 (6th)	14	3rd	1:34.54	William Buick	0.44	Golden Sixty	
2024 – five-year-old season
Mar 30	Turf 1800 m (Good)	Dubai Turf	G1	Meydan	12.5 (7th)	16	2nd	1:45.93	Cristian Demuro	0.2	Facteur Cheval	
May 12	Turf 1600 m (Good)	Victoria Mile	GI	Tokyo	2.5 (2nd)	15	8th	1:32.3	Yutaka Take	0.5	Ten Happy Rose	
Jun 2	Turf 1600 m (Yielding)	Yasuda Kinen	GI	Tokyo	10.0 (4th)	18	2nd	1:32.4	Yutaka Take	0.1	Romantic Warrior	
Nov 17	Turf 1600 m (Good)	Mile Championship	GI	Kyoto	4.8 (2nd)	17	17th	1:37.8	Cristian Demuro	5.8	Soul Rush	

Legend:

- R indicated that it was a record finish time.

== Pedigree ==
Pedigree of Namur (JPN)
Sire Harbinger (GB) 2006	Dansili (GB); 1996	Danehill	Danzig
Sire Harbinger (GB) 2006	Dansili (GB); 1996	Danehill	Razyana
Sire Harbinger (GB) 2006	Dansili (GB); 1996	Hasili	Kahyasi
Sire Harbinger (GB) 2006	Dansili (GB); 1996	Hasili	Kerali
Sire Harbinger (GB) 2006	Penang Pearl (GB); 1996	Bering	Arctic Tern
Sire Harbinger (GB) 2006	Penang Pearl (GB); 1996	Bering	Beaune
Sire Harbinger (GB) 2006	Penang Pearl (GB); 1996	Guapa	Shareef Dancer
Sire Harbinger (GB) 2006	Penang Pearl (GB); 1996	Guapa	Sauceboat
Dam Sambre et Meuse (JPN) 2010	Daiwa Major (JPN); 2001	Sunday Silence	Halo
Dam Sambre et Meuse (JPN) 2010	Daiwa Major (JPN); 2001	Sunday Silence	Wishing Well
Dam Sambre et Meuse (JPN) 2010	Daiwa Major (JPN); 2001	Scarlet Bouquet	Northern Taste
Dam Sambre et Meuse (JPN) 2010	Daiwa Major (JPN); 2001	Scarlet Bouquet	Scarlet Ink
Dam Sambre et Meuse (JPN) 2010	Vite Marcher (JPN); 2002	French Deputy	Deputy Minister
Dam Sambre et Meuse (JPN) 2010	Vite Marcher (JPN); 2002	French Deputy	Mitterand
Dam Sambre et Meuse (JPN) 2010	Vite Marcher (JPN); 2002	Kyoei March	Dancing Brave
Dam Sambre et Meuse (JPN) 2010	Vite Marcher (JPN); 2002	Kyoei March	Inter Charmant

- Namur is inbred 5 × 5 × 5 to Northern Dancer (sire side × sire side × dam side) and 5 × 5 to Lyphard (sire side × dam side).
- Her sire Harbinger won the 2010 King George VI and Queen Elizabeth Stakes.
- Her dam Sambre et Meuse won three races. Her half-sister Ravel won the Artemis Stakes (2022) and Challenge Cup (2024).
- Her third dam Kyoei March won the 1997 Oka Shō.
- Her aunt, Marche Lorraine, won the 2021 Breeders' Cup Distaff.

== See also ==
- Thoroughbred racing in Japan
- Mile Championship
