= Stars on Earth =

Japanese-bred Thoroughbred racehorse

Stars on Earth スターズオンアース
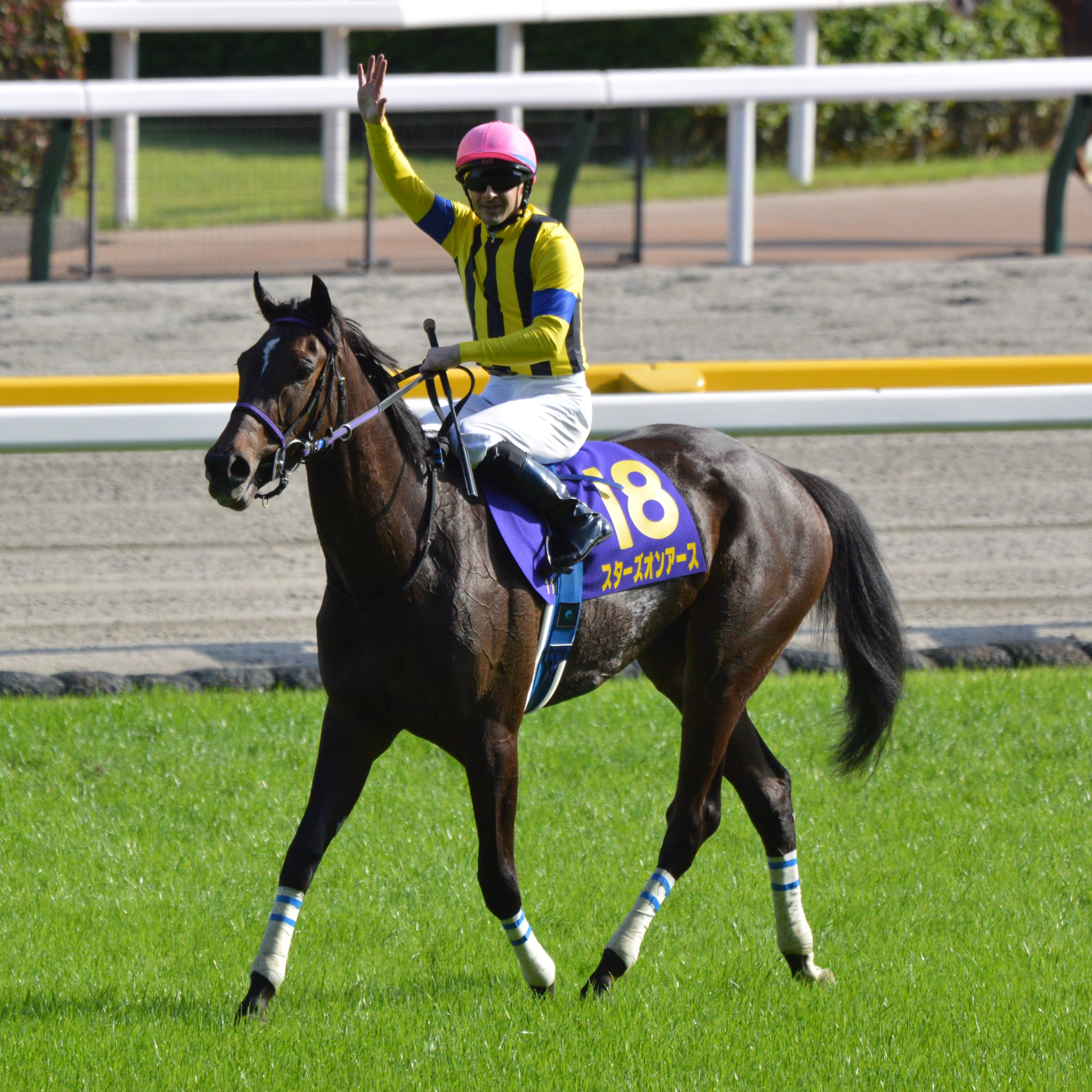
- Stars on Earth at the Yushun Himba
- Sire: Duramente
- Grandsire: King Kamehameha
- Dam: Southern Stars
- Damsire: Smart Strike
- Sex: Mare
- Foaled: February 27, 2019 (age 7)
- Country: Japan
- Colour: Dark Bay
- Breeder: Shadai Farm
- Owner: Shadai Race Horse Co., Ltd
- Racing colours
- Trainer: Mizuki Takayanagi
- Jockey: Christophe Lemaire
- Record: 15: 3-5-4
- Earnings: 840,981,000 JPY (Note: Earnings earned overseas are converted to JPY using the formula provided by JRA.); JPN: 849,465,100; UAE: 60,000 USD

Major wins
- Japanese Classic Tiara Race wins: Ōka Shō (2022); Yushun Himba (2022)

Awards
- JRA Award for Best Three-Year-Old Filly (2022)

Stars on Earth (Japanese: スターズオンアース, Hepburn: Sutāzu on Āsu; foaled February 27, 2019) is a retired Japanese Thoroughbred racehorse and current broodmare. She showed some promise as a juvenile in 2021, winning one minor race from three starts. She showed improved form in the following spring, running second in both the Fairy Stakes and the Queen Cup before taking the Grade 1 Ōka Shō and Yushun Himba.

== Background ==
Stars on Earth is a bay mare with a white star bred in Japan by Shadai Farm. During her racing career, she was trained by Mizuki Takayanagi and raced in the yellow and black colours of Shadai Race Horse Co., Ltd.

She was from the second crop of foals sired by Duramente, who won the Satsuki Sho and the Tokyo Yushun and was named Best Three-Year-Old Colt in Japan for 2015. Stars on Earth's dam Southern Stars showed modest racing ability in her native Britain, winning one minor race from four attempts. She was the first foal of Stacelita, a multiple Group 1 winner in both Europe and the United States. As a descendant of the German mare Schonbrunn (foaled 1966) she was closely related to many other major winners including Sagace, Zagreb and Steinlen. Stacelita's second foal was Soul Stirring.

== Racing career ==
=== 2021: two-year-old season ===
Stars on Earth began her racing career in a contest for previously unraced juveniles over 1800 metres on firm ground at Niigata Racecourse on 1 August 2021. Ridden by Shu Ishibashi she started the 2.9/1 second choice in the betting and finished second to the favoured Rouge Stiria, beaten three quarters of a length by the winner. Ishibashi was again in the saddle when the filly started favourite for a maiden race for over the same distance at Tokyo Racecourse on 9 October and recorded her first success as she produced a strong late run down centre of the straight to take the lead inside the last 200 metres and win by two lengths from the colt Yuino Gotoku. Stars on Earth ended her first campaign in the Akamatsu Sho, a minor event over 1600 metres at Tokyo on 21 November when she started favourite but came home third of the nine runners behind Namur and Personal High.

=== 2022: three-year-old season ===
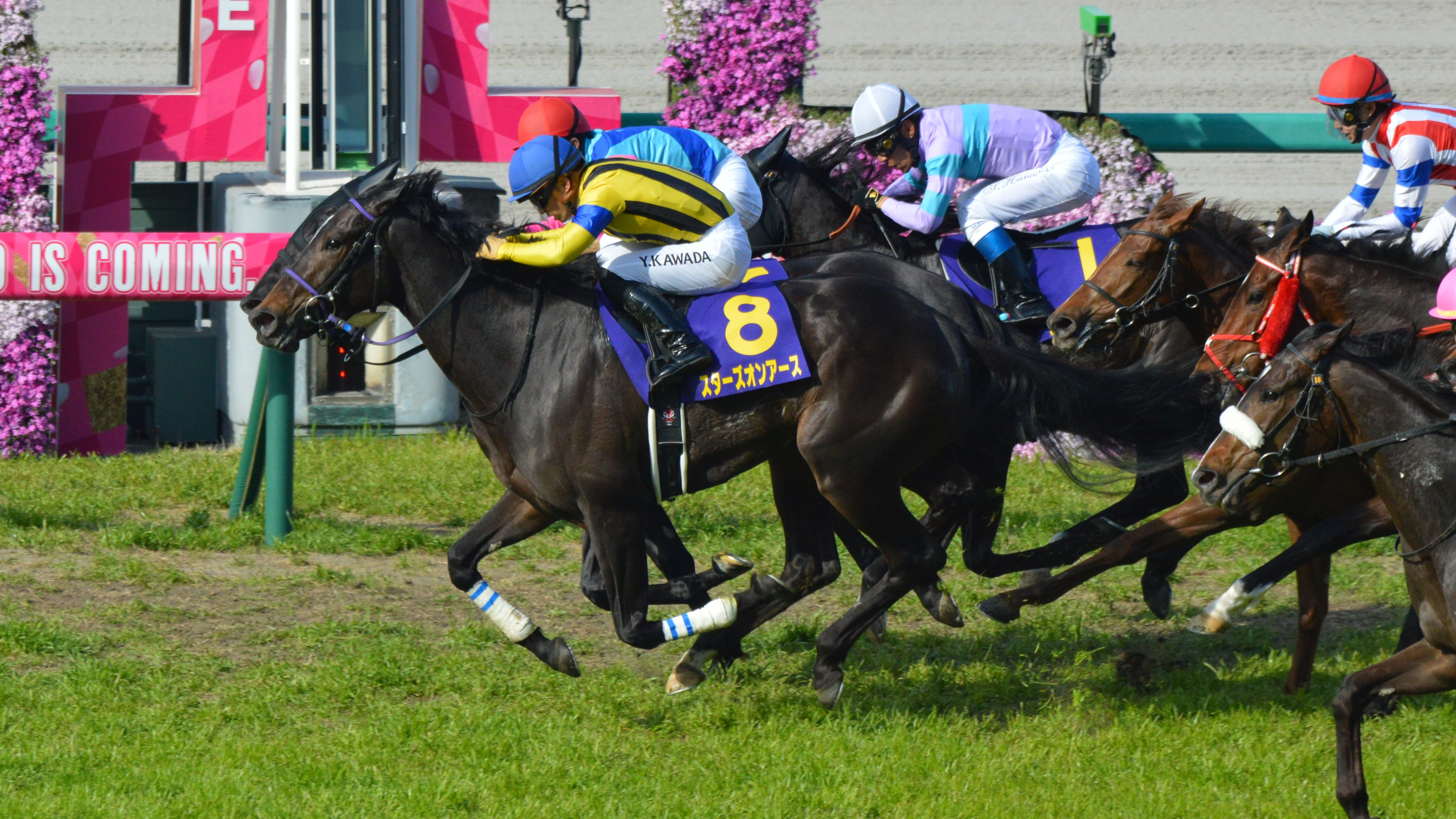
Stars on Earth winning the Ōka Shō

On her first appearance as a three-year-old Stars on Earth started the 3.3/1 favourite when she was stepped up in class to contest the grade 3 Fairy Stakes over 1600 metres at Nakayama Racecourse on 10 January but despite producing a strong late run along the inside rail she was beaten a neck into second place by Lilac. In the Grade 3 Queen Cup at over the same distance Tokyo a month later she was again the beaten favourite, going down by a neck to Presage Lift after briefly taking the lead in the last 200 metres. Her trainer Mizuki Takayanagi felt that the filly's defeats were at least partly due to her tendency to hang to the right and attempted to remedy the problem by equipping her with a cheek-piece and a new type of bit.

On 10 April at Hanshin, Stars on Earth was promoted to the highest level to contest the Ōka Shō and started at odds of 13.5/1 in an eighteen-runner field. Namur (winner of the Tulip Sho on her last start) went off favourite, while the other contenders included Circle of Life, Presage Lift, Lilac, Personal High, Water Navillera (Fantasy Stakes) and Namura Clair (Kokura Nisai Stakes). Ridden for the first time by Yuga Kawada, Stars on Earth settled in mid-division and turned into the straight in ninth place. She looked unlikely to obtain a clear run but found a gap in the closing stages and produced an impressive burst of acceleration to catch Water Navillera on the line and win by a nose. After the race Kawada said, "I'm just so glad that she actually snatched the win at the end—I knew we had caught up but couldn't tell who'd won. I'd been aware during workouts that she was a bit difficult to control but besides keeping that in mind, the plan today was to stay in mid-pack and let her run in a comfortable rhythm. It was definitely her strength and determination that shone and gave us the win today. I'm looking forward to how she develops from here".

On 22 May, Stars on Earth was entered into the second leg of the Triple Tiara, the Yushun Himba. As Kawada was scheduled to ride Art House for that race, it was announced that Christophe Lemaire would be riding her for that race. She started from the outside, as her gate was on the furthest outside, but after bending the fourth corner the horse went in to take the lead, and overtook at the final 100 metres, and won the race with a 1-and-quarter length lead against Stunning Rose, making her the first horse since Daring Tact in 2020 to have won two of the Triple Tiara.

On 28 May, it was announced by Shadai Racehorse that the horse had suffered a minor bone fracture, with surgery being performed on the horse on 2 June. The horse recovered from the surgery, and it was eventually announced that the horse will be entered into the final leg of the Triple Tiara, the Shūka Shō, with Lemaire reprising his role as her jockey.

At the Shūka Shō, the horse's start was slow and she placed herself third from last, and attempted to catch up to Stunning Rose and Namur, who were leading the race, but ultimately finished third behind the two horses, with Stunning Rose beating Stars on Earth by half a length. After the race, Stars of Earth was taken out of the race for the remainder of the year after it was revealed that she had once again suffered the same bone fracture, on top of desmitis, from earlier that year.

=== 2023: four-year-old season ===
After recovering from the conditions of the previous year, it was announced that the horse would be entered to the Osaka Hai to start off the season, but at the race Stars of Earth was beaten by a nose by Jack d'Or. The horse later went on to race in the Victoria Mile, but finished 3rd.

After the Victoria Mile, the horse was sent to pasture at the Yamamoto Training Center in Miyagi Prefecture to spend the summer there. Upon returning, it was announced by Shadai Racehorsing that the horse will be entered to the autumn edition of the Tenno Sho, with Mirco Demuro as her new jockey as Lemaire is scheduled to ride Equinox for that race. However, plans to race her in the Tenno Sho were soon scrapped after it was discovered her right hind was having issues.

As the horse skipped Tenno Sho, the owner focusing on the Japan Cup. with William Buick at the helm, the horse finished strongly in third behind Equinox and Liberty Island. Back in Japan, the horse was set up for the grand prix, Arima Kinen. Stars on Earth placed 13th in the fan voting. The horse performed better than the odds given as Lemaire, who came back in jockeying her managed to get a great start and set up a pace behind Titleholder. As they approached the third corner, Stars on Earth hit the railings but that did not affected her run as the horse sprinted well past through Titleholder on the final corner. However, Do Deuce who was jockeyed by Yutaka Take ran past over the horse at the final straight to take the win and Stars on Earth finished second on the day.

=== 2024: five-year-old season ===
Into the new season, Lemaire suggested that Stars on Earth was capable enough to race in Dubai Sheema Classic. Her owner, Shadai agreed on that suggestion and stating that Lemaire will remained as her jockey but he suffered an injury when he fell from a horse in Dubai Turf race that day. This incident pushed Frankie Dettori to act as a replacement jockey for the horse. Dettori did well in the early phase, sitting well in fourth to fifth place but made a mistake in the final phase as the horse turned to the outside whilst he instructed her to move inside. This move cost her the race in which Stars on Earth finished eighth.

After the race, it was discovered that both of her front legs were swelling, thus rendering her off from the race in the whole remaining spring campaign. The horse tried to make a comeback in autumn campaign but only able to place seventh in the Japan Cup and lowly 14th in the Arima Kinen. Stars on Earth retired after this race in which her registration removed on the same day and the horse will be assigned to became a broodmare in Shadai Farm near Hokkaido. Her trainer, Takayanagi reminisced on her career - "She's a horse I have fond memories of. I'm very grateful."

== Racing form ==
The following racing form is based on information available on JBIS, Netkeiba and Racingpost.

Date	Track	Race	Grade	Distance (condition)	Entry	HN	Odds (Favored)	Finish	Time	Margins	Jockey	Winner (Runner-up)
2021 – two-year-old season
Aug 1	Niigata	2YO Debut		1800 m (Firm)	10	9	4.9 (2)	2nd	1:51.3	0.1	Shu Ishibashi	Rouge Stiria
Oct 9	Tokyo	2YO Maiden		1800 m (Firm)	12	5	2.6 (1)	1st	1:47.3	–0.3	Shu Ishibashi	(Yuino Gotoku)
Nov 21	Tokyo	Akamatsu Sho	1Win	1600 m (Firm)	9	9	2.3 (1)	3rd	1:34.3	0.5	Shu Ishibashi	Namur
2022 – three-year-old season
Jan 10	Nakayama	Fairy Stakes	3	1600 m (Firm)	16	3	4.3 (1)	2nd	1:35.3	0.1	Shu Ishibashi	Lilac
Feb 12	Tokyo	Queen Cup	3	1600 m (Firm)	16	9	3.4 (1)	2nd	1:34.2	0.1	Takeshi Yokoyama	Presage Lift
Apr 10	Hanshin	Ōka Shō	1	1600 m (Firm)	18	8	14.5 (7)	1st	1:32.9	0.0	Yuga Kawada	(Water Navillera)
May 22	Tokyo	Yushun Himba	1	2400 m (Firm)	17	18	6.5 (3)	1st	2:23.9	–0.2	Christophe Lemaire	(Stunning Rose)
Oct 16	Kyoto	Shūka Shō	1	2000 m (Firm)	16	9	3.0 (1)	3rd	1:58.7	0.1	Christophe Lemaire	Stunning Rose
2023 – four-year-old season
Apr 2	Hanshin	Osaka Hai	1	2000 m (Firm)	16	11	3.4 (1)	2nd	1:57.4	0.0	Christophe Lemaire	Jack d'Or
May 14	Tokyo	Victoria Mile	1	1600 m (Firm)	16	2	2.5 (1)	3rd	1:32.3	0.1	Christophe Lemaire	Songline
Nov 26	Tokyo	Japan Cup	1	2400 m (Firm)	18	17	26.6 (5)	3rd	2:22.6	0.8	William Buick	Equinox
Dec 24	Nakayama	Arima Kinen	1	2500 m (Firm)	16	16	8.6 (7)	2nd	2:31.0	0.1	Christophe Lemaire	Do Deuce
2024 – five-year-old season
Mar 30	Meydan	Dubai Sheema Classic	1	2410 m (Firm)	12	11	4.2 (3)	8th	2:28.2	2.5	Frankie Dettori	Rebel's Romance
Nov 24	Tokyo	Japan Cup	1	2400 m (Firm)	14	14	12.7 (5)	7th	2:26.1	0.6	Yuga Kawada	Do Deuce
Dec 22	Nakayama	Arima Kinen	1	2500 m (Firm)	15	7	17.6 (8)	14th	2:33.6	1.8	Yuga Kawada	Regaleira

== Breeding record ==
c = colt

No.	Name	Foaled	Sex	Color	Sire	Races	Wins	Remarks
1st	(Stars on Earth 2026)	2026	c	Brown	Epiphaneia			

== Pedigree ==
Pedigree of Stars on Earth (JPN), dark bay mare, 2019
Sire Duramente (JPN) 2012	King Kamehameha (JPN); 2001	Kingmambo (USA)	Mr Prospector
Sire Duramente (JPN) 2012	King Kamehameha (JPN); 2001	Kingmambo (USA)	Miesque
Sire Duramente (JPN) 2012	King Kamehameha (JPN); 2001	Manfath (IRE)	Last Tycoon
Sire Duramente (JPN) 2012	King Kamehameha (JPN); 2001	Manfath (IRE)	Pilot Bird (GB)
Sire Duramente (JPN) 2012	Admire Groove (JPN); 2000	Sunday Silence (USA)	Halo
Sire Duramente (JPN) 2012	Admire Groove (JPN); 2000	Sunday Silence (USA)	Wishing Well
Sire Duramente (JPN) 2012	Admire Groove (JPN); 2000	Air Groove	Tony Bin (IRE)
Sire Duramente (JPN) 2012	Admire Groove (JPN); 2000	Air Groove	Dyna Carle
Dam Southern Stars (GB) 2013	Smart Strike (CAN); 1992	Mr Prospector (USA)	Raise A Native
Dam Southern Stars (GB) 2013	Smart Strike (CAN); 1992	Mr Prospector (USA)	Gold Digger
Dam Southern Stars (GB) 2013	Smart Strike (CAN); 1992	Classy 'n Smart	Smarten (USA)
Dam Southern Stars (GB) 2013	Smart Strike (CAN); 1992	Classy 'n Smart	No Class
Dam Southern Stars (GB) 2013	Stacelita (FR); 2006	Monsun (GER)	Königsstuhl
Dam Southern Stars (GB) 2013	Stacelita (FR); 2006	Monsun (GER)	Mosella
Dam Southern Stars (GB) 2013	Stacelita (FR); 2006	Soignee (GER)	Dashing Blade (GB)
Dam Southern Stars (GB) 2013	Stacelita (FR); 2006	Soignee (GER)	Suivez (FR) (Family: 16-c)

- Stars on Earth was inbred 3 × 4 to Mr Prospector, meaning that this stallion appears in both the third and fourth generations of her pedigree.
