= Chunichi Shimbun Hai =

Horse race in Japan

Chunichi Shimbun Hai 中日新聞杯
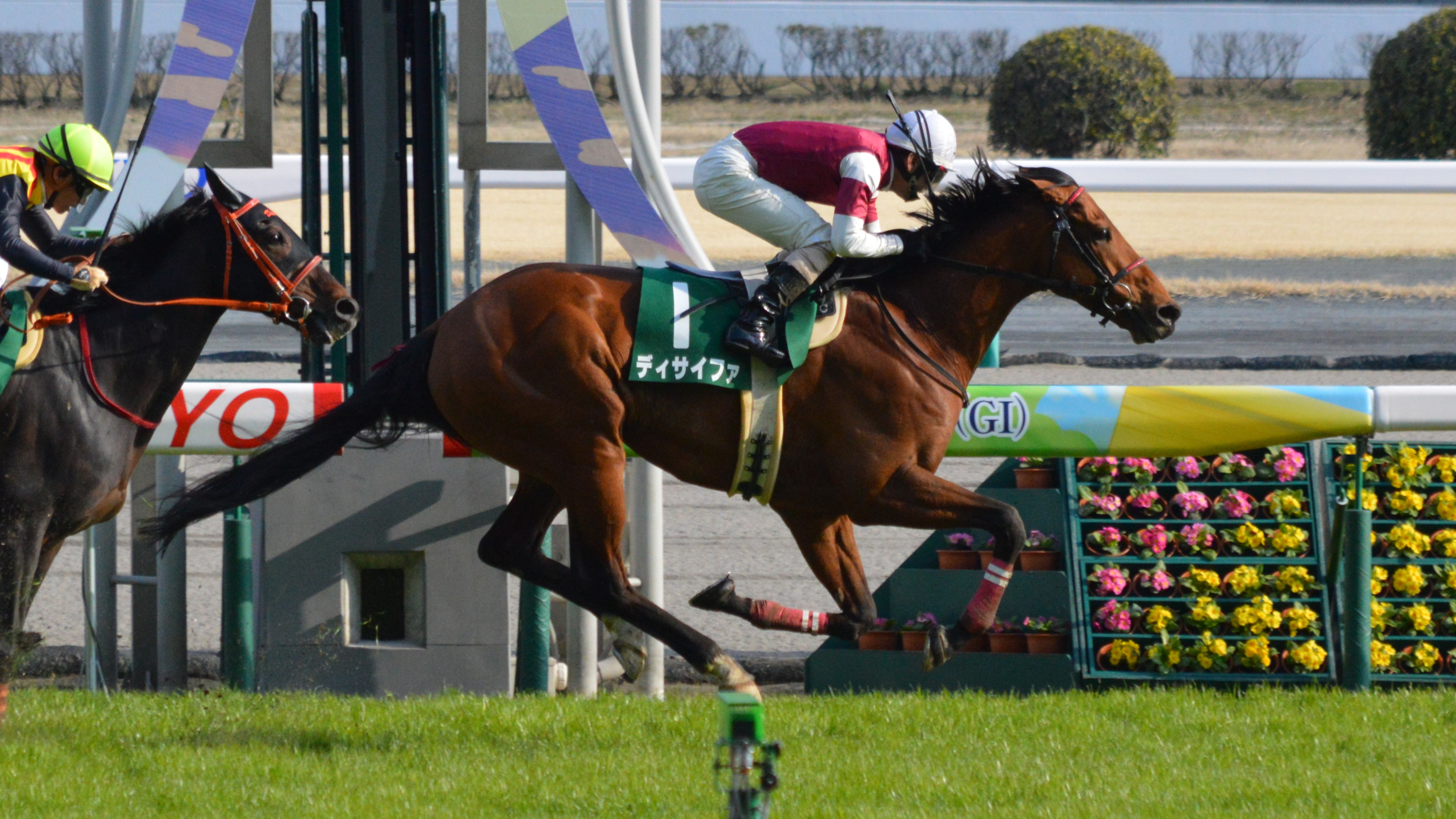
- Decipher wins the 2015 Chunichi Shimbun Hai.
- Class: Grade 3
- Location: Chukyo Racecourse, Toyoake, Aichi, Japan.
- Inaugurated: 1965
- Race type: Thoroughbred Flat racing

Race information
- Distance: 2000 metres
- Surface: Turf
- Track: Left-handed
- Qualification: 3-y-o+
- Weight: Handicap
- Purse: ¥ 92,980,000 (as of 2025): 1st: ¥ 43,000,000; 2nd: ¥ 17,000,000; 3rd: ¥ 11,000,000

The Chunichi Shimbun Hai (Japanese: 中日新聞杯) is a Grade 3 horse race for Thoroughbreds aged three and over, run in December over a distance of 2000 metres on turf at Chukyo Racecourse.

It was first run in 1965 and has held Grade 3 status since 1984. The race was usually run over 1800 metres before being moved up to its current distance in 2006. It was run at Kokura Racecourse in 1991, 1993, 1994, 2010, and 2011.

== Winners since 2000 ==
Year	Winner	Age	Jockey	Trainer	Owner	Time
2000	Tosho Andre	4	Koichi Tsunoda	Sakae Watanabe	Tosho Sangyo	1:46.4
2001	Grand Pas de Deux	4	Eiji Nakadate	Hiroyuki Nagahama	Sunday Racing	1:48.0
2002	My Sole Sound	3	Masaru Honda	Katsuichi Nishiura	Kiyoshi Sano	1:47.9
2003	Precise Machine	4	Hiroki Goto	Kiyoshi Hagiwara	Seiichi Iketani	1:47.6
2004	Precise Machine	5	Hiroki Goto	Kiyoshi Hagiwara	Seiichi Iketani	1:46.3
2005	Gran Rio	5	Yuichi Shibayama	Takehisa Sasakura	Hareo Tanaka	1:46.4
2006	Toho Alan	3	Christophe Lemaire	Hideaki Fujiwara	Toho Bussan	1:57.8
2007	Sunrise Max	3	Mirco Demuro	Yutaka Masumoto	Takao Matsuoka	1:58.5
2008	Yamanin Kingly	3	Mirco Demuro	Hiroshi Kawachi	Hajime Doi	1:59.5
2009	Earnestly	4	Tetsuzo Sato	Shozo Sasaki	Koji Maeda	1:57.4
2010	To The Glory	3	Mirco Demuro	Yasutoshi Ikee	Carrot Farm	1:58.7
2011	Cosmo Phantom	4	Takuya Ono	Toru Miya	Big Red Farm	1:59.6
2012	Smart Gear	7	Kohei Matsuyama	Masaru Sayama	Toru Okawa	2:02.2
2013	Satono Apollo	5	Masayoshi Ebina	Sakae Kunieda	Hajime Satomi	1:59.6
2014	Martinborough	5	Dario Vargiu	Yasuo Tomomichi	Kazumi Yoshida	2:01.7
2015	Decipher	6	Hirofumi Shii	Futoshi Kojima	H. H. Sheikh Mohammed	2:01.2
2016	Satono Noblesse	6	Yuga Kawada	Yasutoshi Ikee	Hajime Satomi	2:01.3
2017	Maitres d'Art	4	Cristian Demuro	Hirofumi Toda	Carrot Farm	1:59.3
2018	Gibeon	3	Cristian Demuro	Hideaki Fujiwara	Shadai Race Horse	1:59.3
2019	Satono Garnet	4	Ryusei Sakai	Yoshito Yahagi	Satomi Horse Company	1:59.2
2020	Boccherini	4	Kohei Matsuyama	Yasutoshi Ikee	Kaneko Makoto Holdings	2:00.1
2021	Shonan Bardi	5	Yasunari Iwata	Takeshi Matsushita	Tetsuhide Kunimoto	1:59.8
2022	Killer Ability	3	Taisei Danno	Takashi Saito	Carrot Farm	1:59.4
2023	Yamanin Salvum	4	Kousei Miura	Naoya Nakamura	Hajime Doi	1:58.8
2024	Desierto	5	Yasunari Iwata	Shogo Yasuda	La Mer	1:58.4
2025	Shake Your Heart	5	Yoshihiro Furukawa	Toru Miya	Chizu Yoshida	1:57.6

== Earlier winners ==
- 1965 - Ballymoss Nisei
- 1966 - Aoba
- 1967 - Genkai
- 1968 - Tomi Masa
- 1969 - Haku Sensho
- 1970 - Speedy Wonder
- 1971 - Shadai Center
- 1972 - Nihon Pillow Moutiers
- 1973 - Kyoei Attack
- 1974 - Good Kirameki
- 1975 - Sanpo
- 1976 - Three York
- 1977 - King Lanark
- 1978 - Riki Taiko
- 1979 - Three Fire
- 1980 - Sun Rider
- 1981 - Western George
- 1982 - Tatsuyu Chikara
- 1983 - Fuji Madonna
- 1984 - Ascot Eight
- 1985 - Kikuno Pegasus
- 1986 - Hakuryo Bell
- 1987 - Windstoss
- 1988 - Tokino Orient
- 1989 - Tosho Arrow
- 1990 - Dokan Jo
- 1991 - Shori Tenyu
- 1992 - Fuiyama Kenzan
- 1993 - Arashi
- 1994 - Nehai Victory
- 1995 - Go Go Z
- 1996 - Foundry Shori
- 1997 - Foundry Shori
- 1998 - Tsurumaru Gaisen
- 1999 - Shin Kaiun

== See also ==
- Horse racing in Japan
- List of Japanese flat horse races
