= Saudi Arabia Royal Cup =

Saudi Arabia Royal Cup サウジアラビアロイヤルカップ
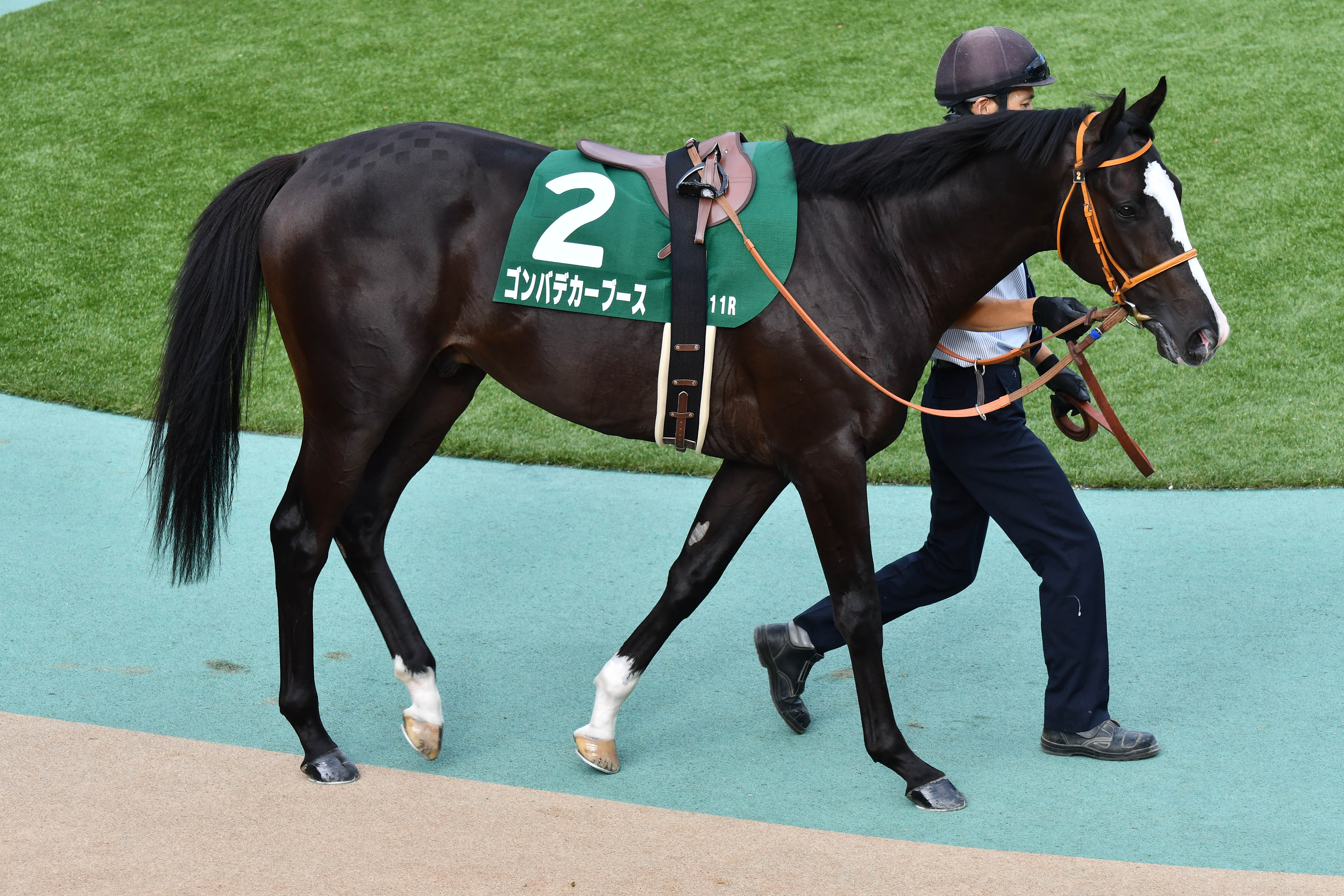
- 2023 winner of Saudi Arabia Royal Cup, Gonbade Qabus
- Class: Grade 3
- Location: Tokyo Racecourse
- Inaugurated: 1988
- Race type: Thoroughbred Flat racing

Race information
- Distance: 1600 metres
- Surface: Turf
- Track: Left-handed
- Qualification: 2-y-o
- Weight: 56 kg Allowance: Fillies 2 kg
- Purse: ¥ 77,360,000 (as of 2026): 1st: ¥ 36,000,000; 2nd: ¥ 14,000,000; 3rd: ¥ 9,000,000

The Saudi Arabia Royal Cup (Japanese サウジアラビアロイヤルカップ) is a Japanese Grade 3 horse race for two-year-old Thoroughbreds run in October over a distance of 1600 metres at Tokyo Racecourse.

The race was first run as an open class race named Ichō Stakes from 1988 until 2014. In 2014, the race was established as an unrated graded stakes race while still retaining its old name. The race was first run under its current name in 2015 and was promoted to Grade 3 status in 2016.

== Winners since 2014 ==
Year	Winner	Jockey	Trainer	Owner	Time
2014	Clarity Sky	Norihiro Yokoyama	Yasuo Tomomichi	Tadakuni Sugiyama	1:33.5
2015	Brave Smash	Norihiro Yokoyama	Michihiro Ogasa	Takaya Shimakawa	1:34.2
2016	Bless Journey	Yoshitomi Shibata	Shinobu Homma	Takaya Shimakawa	1:34.5
2017	Danon Premium	Yuga Kawada	Mitsumasa Nakauchida	Danox Co. Ltd.	1:33.0
2018	Gran Alegria	Christophe Lemaire	Kazuo Fujisawa	Sunday Racing Co. Ltd.	1:34.0
2019	Salios	Shu Ishibashi	Noriyuki Hori	Silk Racing Co. Ltd.	1:32.7
2020	Stella Veloce	Norihiro Yokoyama	Naosuke Sugai	Teruo Ono	1:39.6
2021	Command Line	Christophe Lemaire	Sakae Kunieda	Sunday Racing Co. Ltd.	1:36.4
2022	Dolce More	Kazuo Yokoyama	Naosuke Sugai	Three H Racing Co. Ltd.	1:33.4
2023	Gonbade Qabus	Kohei Matsuyama	Noriyuki Hori	G1 Racing Co. Ltd.	1:33.4
2024	Arte Veloce	Daisuke Sasaki	Naosuke Sugai	Teruo Ono	1:33.0
2025	Ecoro Alba	Ryusei Sakai	Yasuhito Tamura	Masatoshi Haramura	1:33.8
2026	Agordino	Kazuo Yokoyama	Eiji Nakadate	Dearest Club Co. Ltd.	1:34.4

== Earlier Winners ==
- 1988 - Jumbo Seiko
- 1989 - Kamui Fuji
- 1990 - Sakura High Speed
- 1991 - Sanei Thank You
- 1992 - Live House
- 1993 - Trust Kankan
- 1994 - Yamanin Paradise
- 1995 - Air Groove
- 1996 - Mejiro Dober
- 1997 - Tayasu Again
- 1998 - Air Gang Star
- 1999 - Machikane Hokushin
- 2000 - Trust Fire
- 2001 - Sun Valley
- 2002 - Cosmo Imperial
- 2003 - Meteor Burst
- 2004 - Nishino Dokomademo
- 2005 - Jalisco Light
- 2006 - Meiner Segal
- 2007 - Aroma Candle
- 2008 - Danon Come On
- 2009 - Tosen Phantom
- 2010 - Robin Foot
- 2011 - Ardent
- 2012 - Flamme de Gloire
- 2013 - Isla Bonita

== See also ==
- Horse racing in Japan
- List of Japanese flat horse races
