= Artemis Stakes =

Artemis Stakes アルテミスステークス
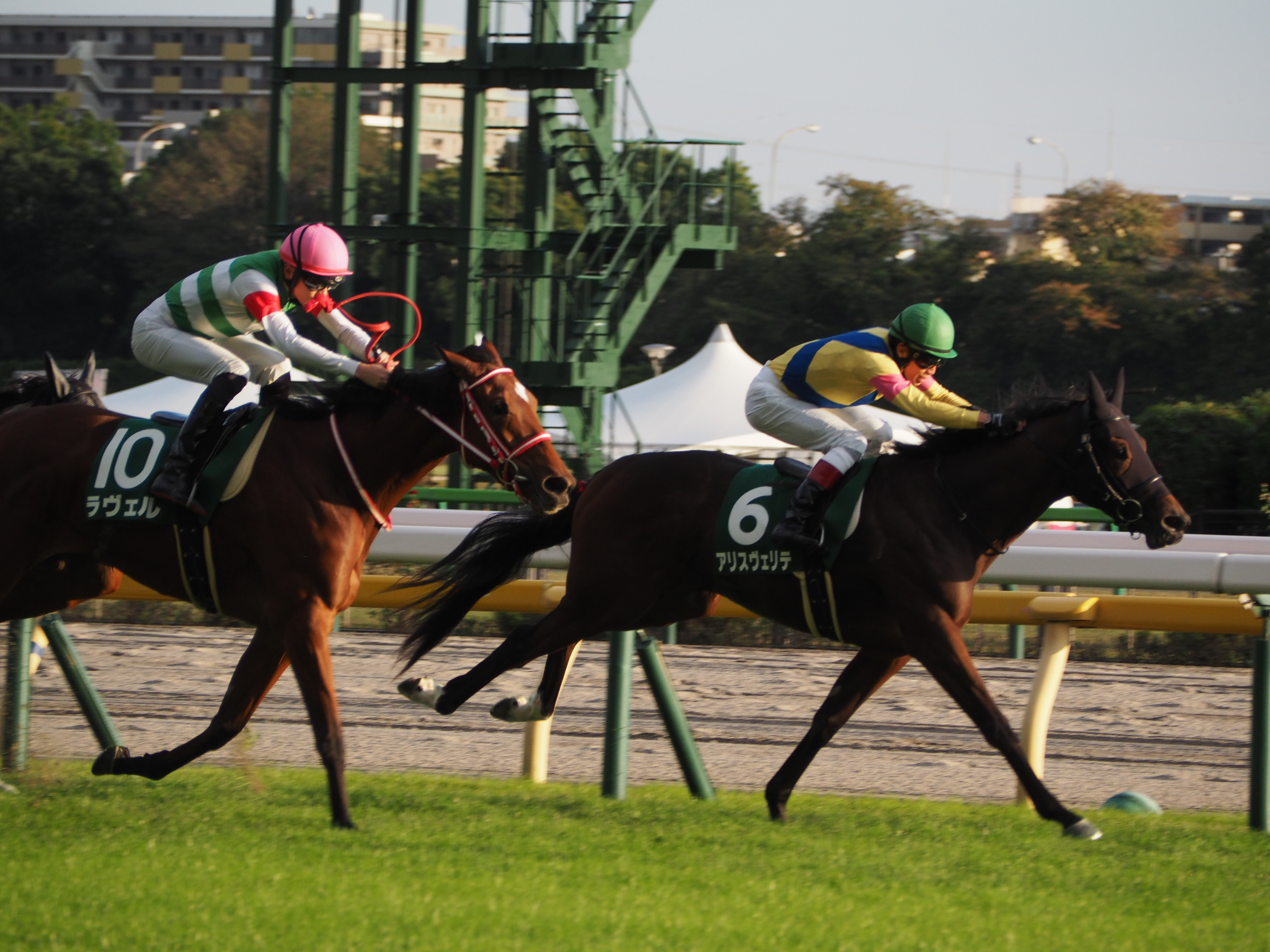
- 2022 Artemis Stakes winner Ravel (left)
- Class: Grade 3
- Location: Tokyo Racecourse
- Inaugurated: 2012
- Race type: Thoroughbred Flat racing

Race information
- Distance: 1600 metres
- Surface: Turf
- Track: Left-handed
- Qualification: 2-y-o
- Weight: 55 kg
- Purse: ¥ 62,840,000 (as of 2024): 1st: ¥ 29,000,000; 2nd: ¥ 12,000,000; 3rd: ¥ 7,000,000

The Artemis Stakes (Japanese アルテミスステークス) is a Japanese Grade 3 horse race for two-year-old Thoroughbred fillies run in October over a distance of 1600 metres at Tokyo Racecourse.

The race was first run in 2012 and has held Grade 3 status since 2014.

== Winners since 2012 ==
Year	Winner	Jockey	Trainer	Time
2012	Collector Item	Suguru Hamanaka	Naosuke Sugai	1:33.8
2013	Marble Cathedral	Hironobu Tanabe	Hiroyuki Uehara	1:35.2
2014	Kokorono Ai	Norihiro Yokoyama	Tomohito Ozeki	1:34.4
2015	Denko Ange	Hironobu Tanabe	Yoshiyuki Arakawa	1:34.1
2016	Lys Gracieux	Yutaka Take	Yoshito Yahagi	1:35.5
2017	Lucky Lilac	Shu Ishibashi	Mikio Matsunaga	1:34.9
2018	Schon Glanz	Yutaka Take	Kazuo Fujisawa	1:33.7
2019	Ria Amelia	Yuga Kawada	Mitsumasa Nakauchida	1:34.3
2020	Sodashi	Hayato Yoshida	Naosuke Sugai	1:34.9
2021	Circle of Life	Mirco Demuro	Sakae Kunieda	1:34.0
2022	Ravel	Ryusei Sakai	Yoshito Yahagi	1:33.8
2023	Cervinia	Christophe Lemaire	Tetsuya Kimura	1:33.6
2024	Brown Ratchet	Christophe Lemaire	Takahisa Tezuka	1:33.8
2025	Firostefani	Yuga Kawada	Mitsumasa Nakauchida	1:33.8
2026	Pulvinar	Christophe Lemaire	Toru Kurita	1:35.8

== See also ==
- Horse racing in Japan
- List of Japanese flat horse races
