= Akaitorino Musume =

Japanese-bred Thoroughbred racehorse

Akaitorino Musume アカイトリノムスメ
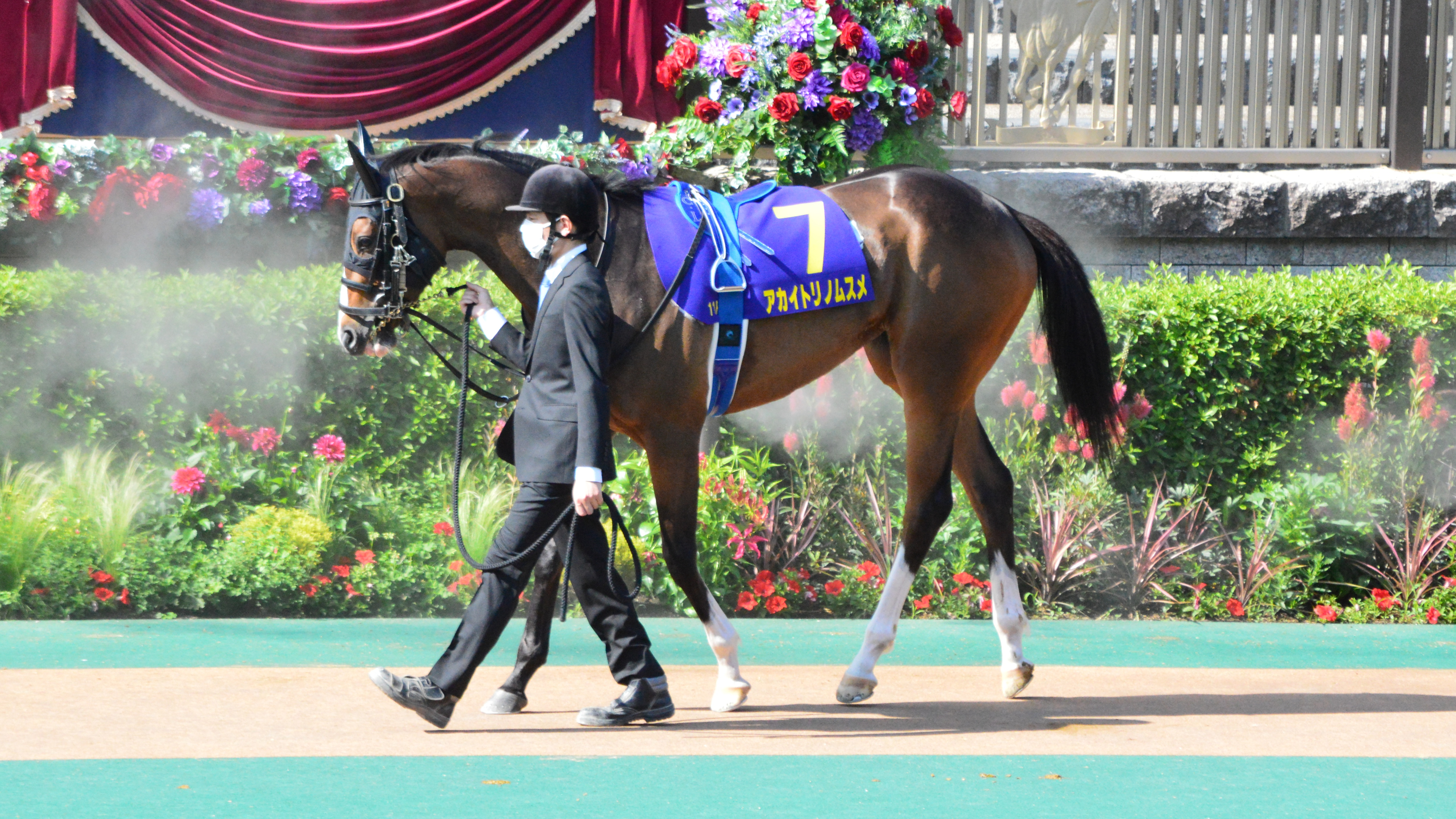
- Akaitorino Musume at the Yushun Himba
- Breed: Thoroughbred
- Sire: Deep Impact
- Grandsire: Sunday Silence
- Dam: Apapane
- Damsire: King Kamehameha
- Sex: Mare
- Foaled: 16 April 2018
- Country: Japan
- Colour: Dark Bay
- Breeder: Northern Farm
- Owner: Kaneko Makoto Holdings
- Racing colours
- Trainer: Sakae Kunieda
- Jockey: Keita Tosaki
- Record: 8: 4-1-0
- Earnings: ¥222,680,000

Major wins
- Queen Cup (2021); Japanese Classic Tiara Race wins: Shūka Shō (2021)

Akaitorino Musume (Japanese: アカイトリノムスメ, foaled 16 April 2018) is a Japanese Thoroughbred racehorse and broodmare. A daughter of two Japanese Triple Crown winners, she showed promise as a two-year-old in 2020, winning two of her three starts. The following year, she won the Queen Cup and performed well in both the Oka Shō and the Yushun Himba before winning the Shūka Shō.

== Background ==
Akaitorino Musume is a dark bay mare with a white blaze and three white socks bred in Japan by Northern Farm. The horse entered the ownership of Makoto Kaneko and was sent into training with Sakae Kunieda. Her name can be translated as Daughter of the Red Bird, as she is a daughter of Apapane who was named after a native Hawaiian red bird.

She was from the eleventh crop of foals sired by Deep Impact, who was the Japanese Horse of the Year in 2005 and 2006, winning races including the Tokyo Yushun, Tenno Sho, Arima Kinen and Japan Cup. Deep Impact's other progeny include Gentildonna, Harp Star, Kizuna, A Shin Hikari, Marialite and Saxon Warrior. Akaitorino Musume was the fifth foal produced by Apapane, an outstanding racemare whose wins included the Hanshin Juvenile Fillies, Oka Sho, Yushun Himba, Shuka Sho and Victoria Mile. Apapane's dam Salty Bid was an American-bred mare who raced in Japan and won three times as well as finishing second in the Grade 3 Fairy Stakes. She was a distant female-line descendant of the influential American broodmare Escutcheon.

== Racing career ==
=== 2020: two-year-old season ===
Akaitorino Musume made her debut in a contest for previously unraced two-year-olds over 1600 metres on firm going at Niigata Racecourse on 2 August when she started the 1.5/1 favourite but came home seventh of the eighteen runners behind the colt Havasu, beaten more than seven lengths by the winner. On 17 October at Tokyo Racecourse the filly went off second favourite for a maiden race over 1600 metres at Tokyo Racecourse. Ridden as on her first start by Keita Tosaki she recorded her first success as she came from seventh place on the final turn to win by a length from Reve de la Prairie. Takeshi Yokoyama took the ride when Akaitorino Musume started favourite for the Akamatsu Sho over the same course and distance on 22 November and won by one and a quarter lengths from May Thousand Hour after coming from ninth place on the last turn.

=== 2021: three-year-old season ===
On her first appearance as a three-year-old, Akaitorino Musume was moved up to contest the Grade 3 Daily Hai Queen Cup (a trial race for the Oka Sho) over 1600 metres at Tokyo on 13 February when she started 3.9/1 second favourite behind Kukuna. Ridden by Tosaki, she settled behind the leaders before taking the lead inside the last 200 metres and prevailed in a tight finish, winning by a neck from Art de Vivre with Kukuna, A Shin Hiten and Isn't She Lovely close behind. Sakae Kunieda commented "she was able to get a good position, keep up well, and though she made her move a bit early, she ran really well. I was able to watch with no anxiety."

In the Grade 1 Oka Sho over 1600 metres at Hanshin Racecourse on 11 April, Akaitorino Musume, with Yokoyama in the saddle, started the 9.5/1 fourth choice in the betting. She was in contention from the start and kept on well in the straight to finish fourth behind Sodashi, Satono Reinas and Fine Rouge, beaten a length by the winner. The filly was then moved up in distance to contest the 2400 metre Yushun Himba at Tokyo on 23 May when she was ridden by Christophe Lemaire and started second favourite behind Sodashi. After settling in sixth place she lost her position on the final turn and was boxed in early in the straight before finding a gap on the inside and finishing strongly to take second place, a length behind the winner Uberleben.

After a summer break of almost five months, Akaitorino Musume returned to the track in the Shuka Sho over 2000 metres at Hanshin on 17 October. Ridden by Tosaki she started the 7.9/1 fourth choice in the betting behind Sodashi, Fine Rouge and Andvaranaut (Rose Stakes) in a sixteen-runner field which also included Uberleben, Art de Vivre, A Shin Hiten, Cool Cat (Flora Stakes) and Ho O Ixelles (Flower Cup). Akaitorino Musume settled in sixth place as A Shin Hiten set the pace from Sodashi before making a sustained run on the outside in the straight. She overtook the tiring A Shin Hiten 100 metres from the finish and kept on well in the closing stages to win by half a length from Fine Rouge with Andvaranaut the same distance away in third place. After the race Tosaki said "I was able to settle the filly in good position and race her in good rhythm. She responded willingly and stretched really well in the lane. I think she is a strong horse and felt that she has stepped up to the next level. I look forward to her performances going forward".

On 15 November Akaitorino Musume was matched against older fillies and mares in the Grade 1 Queen Elizabeth II Cup over 2200 metres at Hanshin and started second favourite behind Lei Papale. After tracking the leaders she was obstructed as she attempted to make progress in the straight and finished seventh behind the 64/1 outsider Akai Ito.

=== 2022: four-year old season ===
Akaitorino Musume was set to run at the Hanshin Himba Stakes on April 9 of that year, and had been the favorite until the final stages, but was removed from the race at the last minute due to her right rear leg becoming lame upon entering the racecourse. It was later revealed her right third phalanx was broken, and she was subsequently retired from racing not long after.

== Racing form ==
Akaitorino Musume won four races in eight starts. This data available on JBIS and netkeiba.

Date	Track	Race	Grade	Distance (Condition)	Entry	HN	Odds (Favored)	Finish	Time	Margins	Jockey	Winner (Runner-up)
2020 – two-year-old season
Aug 2	Niigata	2yo Newcomer		1,600 m (Firm)	18	9	2.5 (1)	7th	1:36.8	1.2	Keita Tosaki	Havasu
Oct 17	Tokyo	2yo Maiden		1,600 m (Good)	14	13	4.5 (2)	1st	1:35.9	–0.2	Keita Tosaki	(Reve de la Prairie)
Nov 22	Tokyo	Akamatsu Sho	1W	1,600 m (Firm)	10	5	3.1 (1)	1st	1:34.5	–0.2	Takeshi Yokoyama	(May Thousand Hour)
2021 – three-year-old season
Feb 13	Tokyo	Queen Cup	3	1,600 m (Firm)	16	6	4.9 (2)	1st	1:33.3	0.0	Keita Tosaki	(Art de Vivre)
Apr 11	Hanshin	Oka Sho	1	1,600 m (Firm)	18	5	10.5 (4)	4th	1:31.3	0.2	Takeshi Yokoyama	Sodashi
May 23	Tokyo	Yushun Himba	1	2,400 m (Firm)	18	7	4.5 (2)	2nd	2:24.6	0.1	Christophe Lemaire	Uberleben
Oct 17	Hanshin	Shuka Sho	1	2,000 m (Firm)	16	12	8.9 (4)	1st	2:01.2	–0.1	Keita Tosaki	(Fine Rouge)
Nov 14	Hanshin	QEII Cup	1	2,200 m (Firm)	17	3	3.4 (2)	7th	2:12.6	0.5	Keita Tosaki	Akai Ito
2022 – four-year-old season
Apr 9	Hanshin	Hanshin Himba Stakes	2	1,600 m (Firm)	11	5	–	Scratched	–	–	Keita Tosaki	Meisho Mimosa

Legend:
Turf

== Breeding record ==
c = colt, f = filly

No.	Name	Foaled	Sex	Color	Sire	Wins	Races	Remarks
1st	Plump Lip	2024	f	Bay	Bricks and Mortar			Pre-debut
2nd	(Akaitorino Musume 2025)	2025	f	Dark Bay	Bricks and Mortar			
3rd	(Akaitorino Musume 2026)	2026	c	Bay	Bricks and Mortar			

== Pedigree ==
Pedigree of Akaitorino Musume (JPN), dark bay mare 2018
Sire Deep Impact (JPN) 2002	Sunday Silence (USA); 1986	Halo	Hail to Reason
Sire Deep Impact (JPN) 2002	Sunday Silence (USA); 1986	Halo	Cosmah
Sire Deep Impact (JPN) 2002	Sunday Silence (USA); 1986	Wishing Well	Understanding
Sire Deep Impact (JPN) 2002	Sunday Silence (USA); 1986	Wishing Well	Mountain Flower
Sire Deep Impact (JPN) 2002	Wind in Her Hair (IRE); 1991	Alzao (USA)	Lyphard
Sire Deep Impact (JPN) 2002	Wind in Her Hair (IRE); 1991	Alzao (USA)	Lady Rebecca (GB)
Sire Deep Impact (JPN) 2002	Wind in Her Hair (IRE); 1991	Burghclere (GB)	Busted
Sire Deep Impact (JPN) 2002	Wind in Her Hair (IRE); 1991	Burghclere (GB)	Highclere
Dam Apapane (JPN) 2007	King Kamehameha (JPN); 2001	Kingmambo (USA)	Mr Prospector
Dam Apapane (JPN) 2007	King Kamehameha (JPN); 2001	Kingmambo (USA)	Miesque
Dam Apapane (JPN) 2007	King Kamehameha (JPN); 2001	Manfath (IRE)	Last Tycoon
Dam Apapane (JPN) 2007	King Kamehameha (JPN); 2001	Manfath (IRE)	Pilot Bird (GB)
Dam Apapane (JPN) 2007	Salty Bid (USA); 2000	Salt Lake	Deputy Minister (CAN)
Dam Apapane (JPN) 2007	Salty Bid (USA); 2000	Salt Lake	Take Lady Anne
Dam Apapane (JPN) 2007	Salty Bid (USA); 2000	Piper Piper	Spectacular Bid
Dam Apapane (JPN) 2007	Salty Bid (USA); 2000	Piper Piper	Alvarada (Family: 9-f)
