= Still in Love (horse) =

Japanese-bred Thoroughbred racehorse

Still in Love スティルインラブ
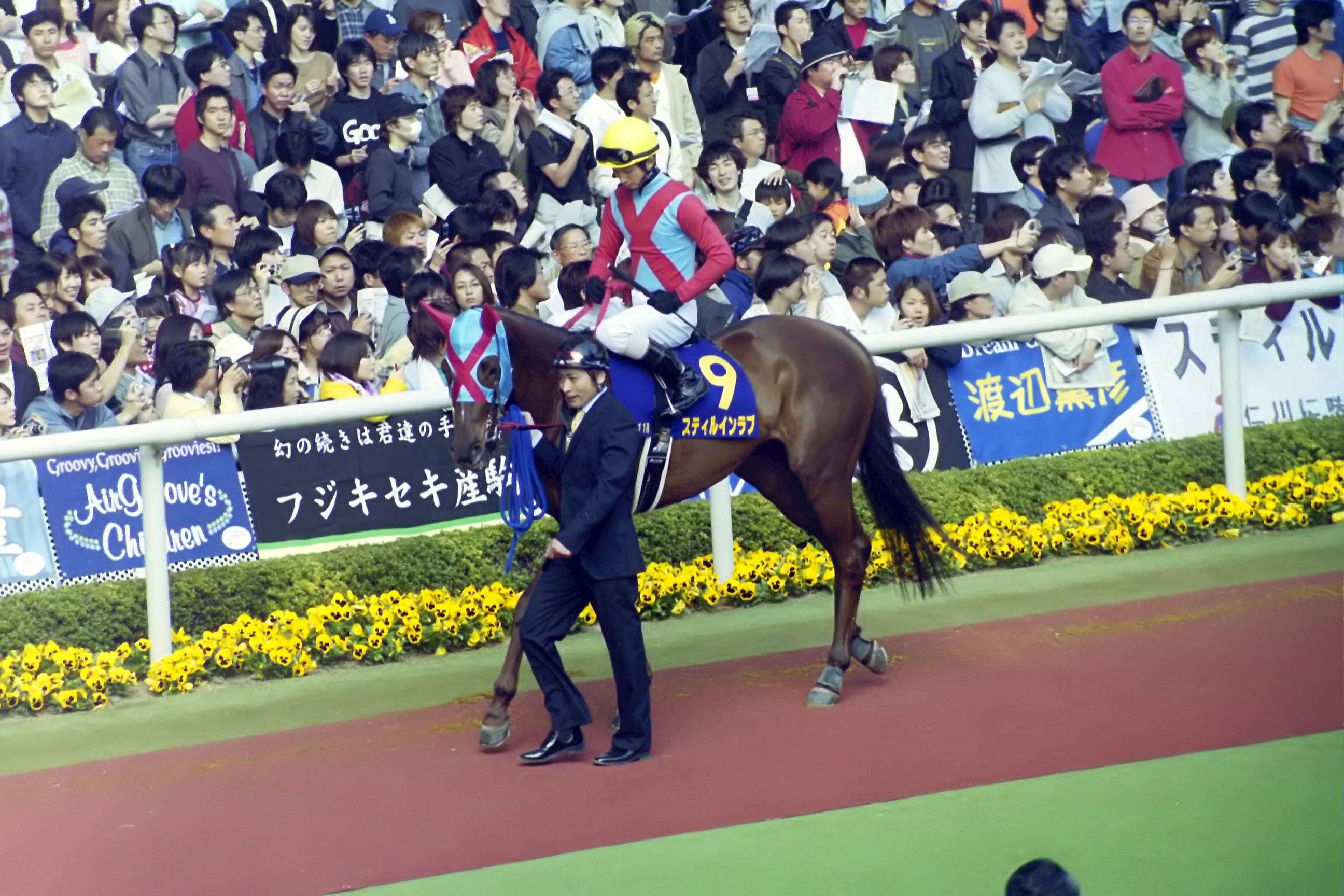
- Still in Love at the paddock during the 2003 Oka Shō.
- Breed: Thoroughbred
- Sire: Sunday Silence (USA)
- Grandsire: Halo (USA)
- Dam: Bradamante (USA)
- Damsire: Roberto (USA)
- Sex: Mare
- Foaled: May 2, 2000
- Died: August 2, 2007 (aged 7)
- Country: Japan
- Colour: Chestnut
- Breeder: Shimokobe Farm
- Owner: North Hills Management Co Ltd
- Racing colours
- Trainer: Shoichi Matsumoto
- Jockey: Hideaki Miyuki
- Record: 16: 5-2-1
- Earnings: ¥1,437,778,000

Major wins
- Japanese Classic Tiara Race wins: Oka Shō (2003); Yushun Himba (2003); Shūka Shō (2003)

Awards
- 2nd Japanese Triple Tiara Champion (2003); JRA Award for Best Three-Year-Old Filly (2003)

Still in Love (Japanese: スティルインラブ, Hepburn: Sutiru in Rabu; 2 May 2000 – 2 August 2007) was a Japanese Thoroughbred racehorse and broodmare. After winning her only race as a juvenile, she became the best filly of her generation in Japan by winning the Oka Sho, Yushun Himba, and Shuka Sho, becoming the second filly to win the Japanese Triple Tiara in 2003. She remained in training for two more years but failed to win again and was retired in 2005. She produced only one foal before dying at the age of seven in 2007.

== Background ==
Still in Love was a chestnut mare bred in Japan by Shimokobe Farm. She was sired by Sunday Silence, who won the 1989 Kentucky Derby, before retiring to stud in Japan where he was champion sire on thirteen consecutive occasions. His other major winners included Deep Impact, Stay Gold, Heart's Cry, Manhattan Cafe, Zenno Rob Roy and Neo Universe. Still in Love's dam Bradamente was an unraced, Kentucky-bred daughter of Roberto. She was a half-sister to Color of Gold, who produced the Yushun Himba winner Robe Decollete.

During her racing career, Still in Love was owned by North Hills Management Co Ltd and trained by Shoichi Matsumoto. She was ridden by Hideaki Miyuki throughout her career.

== Racing career ==
=== 2002 and 2003: two and three-year-old seasons ===
On her only appearance as a two-year-old Still in Love won a maiden race over 1400 metres at Hanshin Racecourse on 30 November 2002.

Still in Love began her second season by winning the Kobai Stakes over 1400 metres at Kyoto Racecourse in January and was then moved up in class for the Grade III Tulip Sho at Hanshin in which she finished second of the sixteen runners behind Osumi Haruka. On 13 April Still in Love was one of seventeen fillies to contest the Grade I Oka Sho (the first leg of the Japanese Fillies Triple Crown) over 1600 metres at the same track. She started the 5/2 joint favourite alongside Admire Groove with the best fancied of the other runners being Yamakatsu Lily and Meine Nouvelle. Still in Love won by one and a half lengths from the 50/1 outsider She Is Tosho with Admire Groove half a length away in third. Her winning time of 1:33.9 was a record for the race. The filly was then moved up in distance for the Yushun Himba over 2400 metres at Tokyo Racecourse on 25 May. She added the second leg of the Triple Crown as she won by one and a quarter lengths from Chunyi, with Shinko Ruby coming third ahead of Yamakatsu Lily.

After a break of almost four months Still in Love returned in the Grade II Rose Stakes at Hanshin on 21 September and finished fifth of the twelve runners behind Admire Groove. On 19 October the filly attempted to complete the Triple Crown in the Shuka Sho over 2000 metres at Kyoto Racecourse in which her opponents included Admire Groove, Peace of World (Hanshin Juvenile Fillies), Osumi Haruka, Chunyi, and Yamakatsu Lily. She won by three quarters of a length from Admire Groove with Yamakatsu Lily, Peace of World and Meine Samantha close behind in third, fourth and fifth. On her final appearance of the season, Still in Love was matched against older fillies and mares in the Queen Elizabeth II Commemorative Cup over 2200 metres at Kyoto in November and finished second, beaten a nose by her old rival Admire Groove.

=== 2004 and 2005: later career ===
In 2004 Still in Love failed to win in five races. In the first part of the season she was unplaced behind Tap Dance City in the Kinko Sho and the Takarazuka Kinen and then finished twelfth of thirteen in the Grade III Kitakyushu Kinen. In the autumn she finished third to Osumi Haruka in the Grade III Fuchu Himba Stakes and ended the year by running ninth behind Admire Groove in the Queen Elizabeth II Commemorative Cup.

Still in Love remained in training as a five-year-old but made no impact in three starts, finishing unplaced in the Kinko Sho, Takarazuka Kinen and Fuchu Himba Stakes.

== Assessment and awards ==
In January 2004, Still in Love was voted the Best Three-Year-Old Filly of 2003 at the JRA Awards.

== Breeding record ==
Still in Love was retired from racing to become a broodmare. She produced only one foal:

- Judah, a chestnut colt, foaled in 2007, sired by King Kamehameha. Won two races. He was later sent to be a participating horse at the Soma Nomaoi.

Still in Love became ill in July 2007 from an abdominal complaint. She underwent surgery but failed to recover and died on 2 August 2007 at the age of seven at Shimokobe Farm.

== In popular culture ==
An anthropomorphized version of Still in Love appears as a character in the Japanese multimedia franchise Umamusume: Pretty Derby, voiced by Saki Miyashita. She is usually depicted as gentle, quiet, and has a faint presence that leaves her unrecognized by other students except for the player trainer and her roommate, Neo Universe. However, she possesses a single-minded love and devotion to the player trainer that manifests during competitions, in which she seems to undergo a personality shift, becoming sadistic and deriving a pleasure in "devouring" the strong — a side she normally suppresses with her rationality. This sense of contrast is fully revealed during her career mode, in which the player has the option to play with a glitching interface that gradually intensifies. As the story progresses, the game screen occasionally flickers, the color palette shifts into a blurred, dark red mist, and dialogue options turn into corrupted code (mojibake) or large blank spaces. This provides a psychological horror experience that some players have even compared to Doki Doki Literature Club!.

== Racing form ==
Still in Love won five races out of 16 starts. This data is available in JBIS and netkeiba.

Date	Racecourse	Race	Grade	Distance (Condition)	Entry	HN	Odds (Favored)	Finish	Time	Margins	Jockey	Winner (Runner-up)
2002 – two-year-old season
Nov 30	Hanshin	2yo Newcomer		1,400 m (Firm)	16	15	1.7 (1)	1st	1:22.2	–0.6	Hideaki Miyuki	(Kitano Suzaku)
2003 – three-year-old season
Jan 19	Kyoto	Kobai Stakes	OP	1,400 m (Firm)	15	5	4.1 (2)	1st	1:22.1	–0.1	Hideaki Miyuki	(Montparnasse)
Mar 8	Hanshin	Tulip Sho	3	1,600 m (Good)	16	6	1.7 (1)	2nd	1:36.0	0.1	Hideaki Miyuki	Osumi Haruka
Apr 13	Hanshin	Oka Sho	1	1,600 m (Firm)	17	9	3.5 (2)	1st	1:33.9	–0.2	Hideaki Miyuki	(She is Tosho)
May 25	Tokyo	Yushun Himba	1	2,400 m (Firm)	17	3	5.6 (2)	1st	2:27.5	–0.2	Hideaki Miyuki	(Chunyi)
Sep 21	Hanshin	Rose Stakes	2	2,000 m (Firm)	12	11	1.9 (1)	5th	2:02.0	0.5	Hideaki Miyuki	Admire Groove
Oct 19	Kyoto	Shuka Sho	1	2,000 m (Firm)	18	17	3.2 (2)	1st	1:59.1	–0.1	Hideaki Miyuki	(Admire Groove)
Nov 16	Kyoto	QEII Cup	1	2,200 m (Firm)	15	5	3.0 (1)	2nd	2:11.8	0.0	Hideaki Miyuki	Admire Groove
2004 – four-year-old season
May 29	Chukyo	Kinko Sho	2	2,000 m (Firm)	12	10	9.2 (5)	8th	1:59.1	1.6	Hideaki Miyuki	Tap Dance City
Jun 27	Hanshin	Takarazuka Kinen	1	2,200 m (Firm)	15	11	42.3 (10)	8th	2:12.6	1.5	Hideaki Miyuki	Tap Dance City
Jul 18	Kokura	Kitakyushu Kinen	3	1,800 m (Firm)	13	6	6.8 (4)	12th	1:45.3	1.2	Hideaki Miyuki	Daitaku Bertram
Oct 17	Tokyo	Fuchu Himba Stakes	3	1,800 m (Firm)	16	5	2.9 (1)	3rd	1:46.4	0.2	Hideaki Miyuki	Osumi Haruka
Nov 14	Kyoto	QEII Cup	1	2,200 m (Firm)	18	15	5.1 (3)	9th	2:14.3	0.7	Hideaki Miyuki	Admire Groove
2005 – five-year-old season
May 28	Chukyo	Kinko Sho	2	2,000 m (Firm)	10	6	28.6 (4)	6th	1:59.5	0.6	Hideaki Miyuki	Tap Dance City
Jun 26	Hanshin	Takarazuka Kinen	1	2,200 m (Firm)	15	14	160.0 (14)	9th	2:12.7	1.2	Hideaki Miyuki	Sweep Tosho
Oct 16	Tokyo	Fuchu Himba Stakes	3	1,800 m (Good)	17	5	10.0 (5)	17th	1:48.2	1.5	Hideaki Miyuki	Yamanin Alabaster

Legend:
Turf

== Pedigree ==
Pedigree of Still in Love (JPN), chestnut mare 2000
Sire Sunday Silence (USA) 1986	Halo (USA); 1969	Hail to Reason	Turn-To
Sire Sunday Silence (USA) 1986	Halo (USA); 1969	Hail to Reason	Nothirdchance
Sire Sunday Silence (USA) 1986	Halo (USA); 1969	Cosmah	Cosmic Bomb
Sire Sunday Silence (USA) 1986	Halo (USA); 1969	Cosmah	Almahmoud
Sire Sunday Silence (USA) 1986	Wishing Well (USA); 1975	Understanding	Promised Land
Sire Sunday Silence (USA) 1986	Wishing Well (USA); 1975	Understanding	Pretty Ways
Sire Sunday Silence (USA) 1986	Wishing Well (USA); 1975	Mountain Flower	Montparnasse
Sire Sunday Silence (USA) 1986	Wishing Well (USA); 1975	Mountain Flower	Edelweiss
Dam Bradamante (USA) 1986	Roberto (USA); 1969	Hail to Reason	Turn-To
Dam Bradamante (USA) 1986	Roberto (USA); 1969	Hail to Reason	Nothirdchance
Dam Bradamante (USA) 1986	Roberto (USA); 1969	Bramalea	Nashua
Dam Bradamante (USA) 1986	Roberto (USA); 1969	Bramalea	Rarelea
Dam Bradamante (USA) 1986	Sulemeif (USA); 1980	Northern Dancer	Nearctic
Dam Bradamante (USA) 1986	Sulemeif (USA); 1980	Northern Dancer	Natalma
Dam Bradamante (USA) 1986	Sulemeif (USA); 1980	Barely Even	Creme Dela Creme
Dam Bradamante (USA) 1986	Sulemeif (USA); 1980	Barely Even	Dodge Me (Family 10-d)

- Still in Love was inbred 3 × 3 to Hail To Reason, meaning that this stallion appears twice in the third generation of her pedigree.

== See also ==
- List of racehorses
