= Apapane (horse) =

Japanese-bred Thoroughbred racehorse

Apapane アパパネ
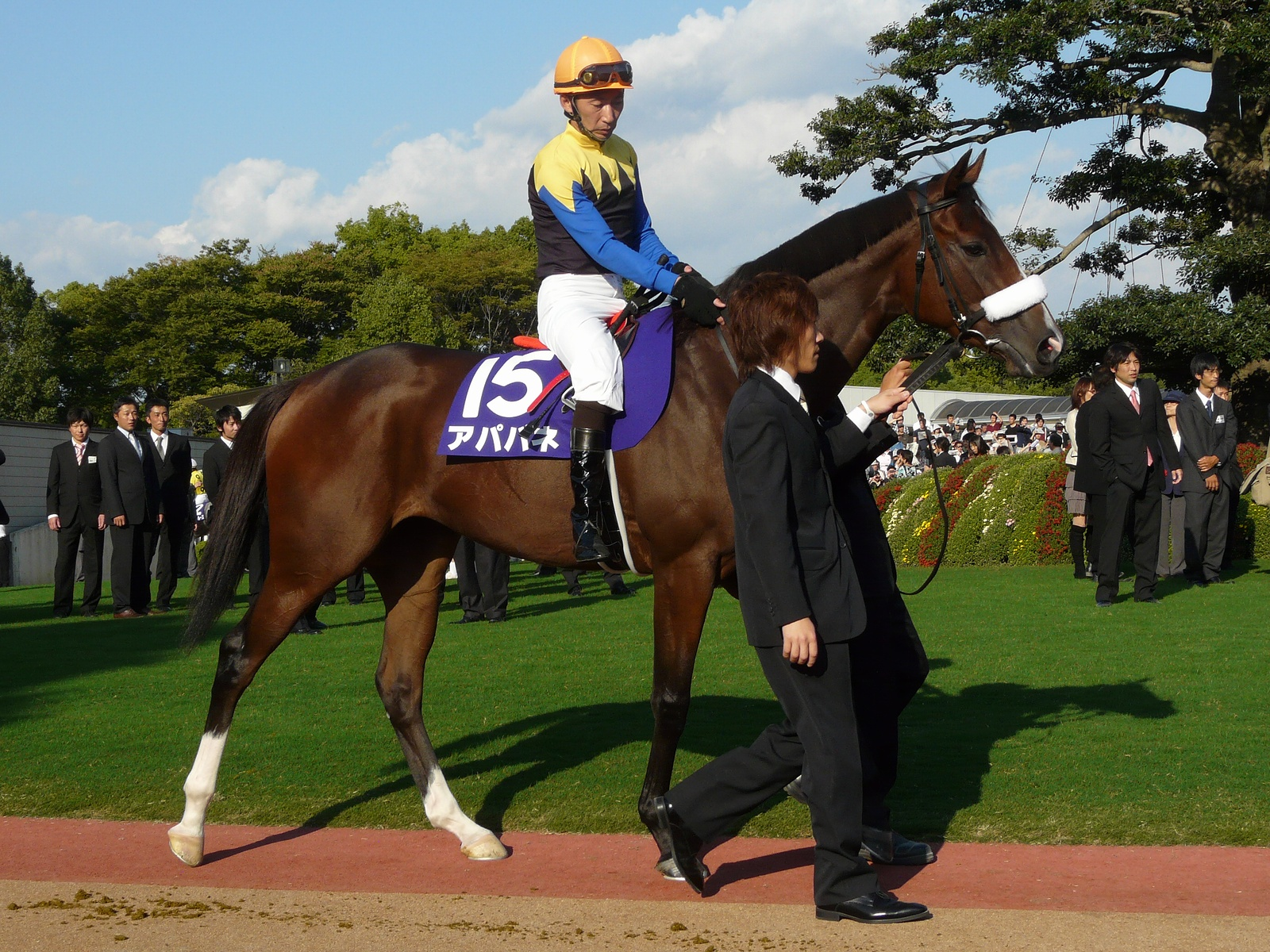
- Apapane at the paddock of the 2010 Shūka Shō.
- Breed: Thoroughbred
- Sire: King Kamehameha (JPN)
- Grandsire: Kingmambo (USA)
- Dam: Salty Bid (USA)
- Damsire: Salt Lake (USA)
- Sex: Mare
- Foaled: April 20, 2007 (age 19)
- Country: Japan
- Colour: Bay
- Breeder: Northern Farm
- Owner: Kaneko Makoto Holdings
- Racing colours
- Trainer: Sakae Kunieda
- Jockey: Masayoshi Ebina
- Record: 19: 7-1-3
- Earnings: ¥558,592,000

Major wins
- Hanshin Juvenile Fillies (2009); Victoria Mile (2011); Japanese Classic Tiara Race wins: Oka Sho (2010); Yushun Himba (2010); Shūka Sho (2010)

Awards
- 3rd Japanese Triple Tiara Champion (2010); JRA Award for Best Two-Year-Old Filly (2009); JRA Award for Best Three-Year-Old Filly (2010)

Apapane (Japanese: アパパネ, Hepburn: Apapane; foaled 20 April 2007) is a Japanese Thoroughbred racehorse and broodmare who became the third filly to win the Japanese Triple Tiara in 2010. As a two-year-old in 2009, she won three of her four races including the Grade I Hanshin Juvenile Fillies and won the JRA Award for Best Two-Year-Old Filly. In the following year, she won the Oka Sho and Yushun Himba, tying the race with Saint Emilion in Japan's first ever dead heat in a Grade 1 race, before completing the Triple Tiara with a victory at the Shūka Sho and winning the JRA Award for Best Three-Year-Old Filly. In the following spring, she won her fifth Grade I race when she defeated the Japanese Horse of the Year Buena Vista in the Victoria Mile. She never won again and was retired after developing a leg problem in September 2012. Apart from her victories, she finished third in consecutive runnings of the Queen Elizabeth II Commemorative Cup in 2010 and 2011.

== Background ==
Apapane is a bay mare with a white blaze and white socks on her hind legs bred in Japan by Northern Farm the breeding operation of her owner Makoto Kaneko. Apapane was trained throughout her racing career by Sakae Kunieda and was ridden in most of her starts by Masayoshi Ebina.

Her sire, King Kamehameha was one of the best Japanese colts of his generation, beating a field including Heart's Cry and Daiwa Major in the 2004 Japanese Derby. His other winners as a breeding stallion include Lord Kanaloa, Rose Kingdom, Belshazzar (Japan Cup Dirt) and Rulership (Queen Elizabeth II Cup). King Kamehameha was named after a Hawaiian monarch: his daughter Apapane was named after a native Hawaiian bird whose feathers were once used to decorate the capes of the island's nobility.

Apapane's dam Salty Bid was an American-bred mare who raced in Japan and won three times as well as finishing second in the Grade III Fairy Stakes. She was a distant female-line descendant of the influential American broodmare Escutcheon.

== Racing career ==
=== 2009: two-year-old season ===
On 5 July 2009 Apapane made her first appearance in a contest for previously unraced two-year-olds over 1800 metres at Fukushima Racecourse and finished third of the sixteen runners behind the colt Lordship. The filly was then off the course for three and a half months before recording her first victory in a maiden race over 1600 metres at Tokyo Racecourse. Two weeks later she won the Akamatsu Sho over the same course and distance in a record time of 1.34.5. On 13 December the filly was stepped up in class to contest the Grade I Hanshin Juvenile Fillies, Japan's most prestigious race for two-year-old fillies over 1600 metres on firm ground at Hanshin Racecourse. Starting at odds of 3.6/1 she won by half a length and three quarters of a length from Animate Bio with the favoured Shimmei Fuji in fifth.

In January 2010 Apapane was voted Champion two-year-old filly in the JRA Awards for 2009.

=== 2010: three-year-old season ===
On her three-year-old debut Apapane contested the Grade III Tulip Sho over 1600 metres on yielding ground at Hanshin on 6 March and was beaten three quarters of a length into second place by Shoryu Moon. On 11 April, on firmer ground, the filly started favourite for the 70th running of the Grade I Oka Sho, the first leg of Japan's Fillies' Triple Crown over the same course and distance. She raced close behind the leaders as Oken Sakura set the pace but looked unlikely to obtain a clear run until Ebina switched her to the outside to make her challenge in the straight. She overtook Oken Sakura in the closing stages to win by half a length in a new track record time of 1:33.3. A Shin Returns took third ahead of Shoryu Moon whilst Animate Bio finished eighth of the eighteen runners.

On 23 May the filly was stepped up in distance and started favourite for the second leg of the Triple Crown, the Grade I Yushun Himba over 2400 metres at Tokyo Racecourse. Oken Sakura, A Shin Returns, Shoryu Moon and Animate Bio were again in the field as well as the Grade II Flora Stakes winner Saint Emilion. On a wet and gloomy day she tracked the leaders before moving to the outside on the final turn. The last 200 metres saw the race develop into a sustained struggle between Apapane and Saint Emilion and with neither filly able to establish an advantage the pair crossed the line together, two lengths clear of the other sixteen runners. After a ten-minute delay during which the racecourse judges scrutinised the photo finish the result was declared as a dead-heat.

After a summer break, Apapane returned in autumn with the third leg of the triple crown, the Shuka Sho as her objective. She prepared for the race with a run in the Grade II Rose Stakes over 1800 metres at Hanshin in September. Racing for the first time in almost four months she finished fourth of the twelve runners behind Animate Bio, Wild Raspberry and A Shin Returns. On 17 October Apapane faced seventeen rivals including Saint Emilion, Animate Bio, Wild Raspberry, A Shin Returns, Shoryu Moon, and Oken Sakura in the Shuka Sho over 2000 metres at Kyoto Racecourse. She completed the Triple Crown, beating Animate Bio by three quarters of a length. On her final run of the season Apapane was matched against older fillies and mares in the Queen Elizabeth II Commemorative Cup over 2200 metres at Kyoto on 14 November. She started the 1.7/1 favourite but was beaten into third place by the British filly Snow Fairy.

In January 2011 Apapane picked up her second JRA Award as she was named champion three-year-old filly of 2010 with 284 of the 285 votes.

=== 2011: four-year-old season ===
Apapane was matched against male opposition on her first appearance of 2011 and finished fourth behind Silport, Clever Tosho and Danon Yoyo in the Grade II Milers Cup at Hanshin on 17 April. Four weeks later the filly returned to Grade I class and all-female competition for the Victoria Mile over 1600 metres on firm ground at Tokyo and started 3/1 second choice in the betting. She faced several of her old rivals from her three-year-old days including Animate Bio, A Shin Returns, Oken Sakura and Wild Raspberry, but by far her most formidable opponent was the outstanding five-year-old racemare Buena Vista who started the 1/2 favourite. Drawn towards the wide outside of the seventeen runner field she was restrained towards the rear before making a strong late run in the straight. She overtook Lady Alba Rosa and Oken Sakura and then held off the challenge of Buena Vista to win by a neck. In June she started favourite for the Yasuda Kinen but finished sixth behind the three-year-old colt Real Impact, beaten less than two lengths by the winner.

After the summer break Apapane returned in the Grade II Fuchu Himba Stakes at Tokyo in October in which she started favourite but finished unplaced behind Italian Red. In November she replicated her 2010 performance in the Queen Elizabeth II Commemorative Cup as she finished third to Snow Fairy. On her final run of the year she was sent to Sha Tin Racecourse for the Hong Kong Mile on 11 December. After racing prominently in the early stages she faded in the straight and finished thirteenth of the fourteen runners behind Able One.

=== 2012: five-year-old season ===
Apapane remained in training as a five-year-old but failed to reproduce her best form and failed to win in three races. She finished seventh in the Grade II Hanshin Himba Stakes, fifth in her attempt to repeat her 2011 success in the Victoria Mile and sixteenth in the Yasuda Kinen. She was being prepared for an autumn campaign when she began to suffer from lameness owing to what was described as "superficial digital flexor tendonitis". She was retired from racing to become a broodmare.

== Racing form ==
Apapane win seven races in 19 starts (with one dead heat finish). This data is available in JBIS, netkeiba and HKJC.

Date	Track	Race	Grade	Distance (Condition)	Entry	HN	Odds (Favored)	Finish	Time	Margins	Jockey	Winner (Runner-up)
2009 – two-year-old season
Jul 5	Fukushima	2yo Newcomer		1,800 m (Firm)	16	8	6.0 (3)	3rd	1:51.5	0.8	Masayoshi Ebina	Lordship
Oct 31	Tokyo	2yo Maiden		1,600 m (Firm)	14	6	5.1 (3)	1st	1:35.9	–0.3	Masayoshi Ebina	(Lo Grand)
Nov 15	Tokyo	Akamatsu Sho	ALW (1W)	1,600 m (Firm)	16	16	6.0 (3)	1st	R1:34.5	–0.4	Masayoshi Ebina	(Blooming Alley)
Dec 13	Hanshin	Hanshin Juvenile Fillies	1	1,600 m (Firm)	18	18	4.6 (2)	1st	1:34.9	–0.1	Masayoshi Ebina	(Animate Bio)
2010 – three-year-old season
Mar 6	Hanshin	Tulip Sho	2	1,600 m (Soft)	16	16	2.2 (1)	2nd	1:36.2	0.1	Masayoshi Ebina	Shoryu Moon
Apr 11	Hanshin	Oka Sho	1	1,600 m (Firm)	18	9	2.8 (1)	1st	1:33.3	–0.1	Masayoshi Ebina	(Oken Sakura)
May 23	Tokyo	Yushun Himba	1	2,400 m (Good)	18	17	3.8 (1)	1st	2:29.0	–	Masayoshi Ebina	Saint Emilion (dh)
Sep 19	Kyoto	Rose Stakes	2	1,800 m (Firm)	12	5	2.1 (1)	4th	1:46.0	0.2	Masayoshi Ebina	Animate Bio
Oct 17	Kyoto	Shūka Sho	1	2,000 m (Firm)	18	15	2.3 (1)	1st	1:58.4	–0.1	Masayoshi Ebina	(Animate Bio)
Nov 14	Kyoto	QEII Cup	1	2,200 m (Firm)	17	5	2.7 (1)	3rd	2:13.5	1.0	Masayoshi Ebina	Snow Fairy
2011 – four-year-old season
Apr 17	Hanshin	Yomiuri Milers Cup	2	1,600 m (Firm)	18	18	7.1 (4)	4th	1:32.8	0.5	Masayoshi Ebina	Silport
May 15	Tokyo	Victoria Mile	1	1,600 m (Firm)	17	16	4.1 (2)	1st	1:31.9	0.0	Masayoshi Ebina	(Buena Vista)
Jun 5	Tokyo	Yasuda Kinen	1	1,600 m (Firm)	18	8	2.2 (1)	6th	1:32.2	0.2	Masayoshi Ebina	Real Impact
Oct 16	Tokyo	Fuchu Himba Stakes	2	1,800 m (Good)	16	4	2.3 (1)	14th	1:47.8	1.0	Masayoshi Ebina	Italian Red
Nov 13	Kyoto	QEII Cup	1	2,200 m (Firm)	18	4	10.0 (4)	3rd	2:11.8	0.2	Masayoshi Ebina	Snow Fairy
Dec 11	Sha Tin	Hong Kong Mile	1	1,600 m (Firm)	14	14	20.0 (9)	13th	1:35.4	1.4	Masayoshi Ebina	Able One
2012 – five-year-old season
Apr 7	Hanshin	Hanshin Himba Stakes	2	1,400 m (Firm)	17	16	6.4 (3)	7th	1:22.3	0.4	Yasunari Iwata	Queen's Barn
May 13	Tokyo	Victoria Mile	1	1,600 m (Firm)	18	7	4.0 (1)	5th	1:32.8	0.4	Masayoshi Ebina	Whale Capture
Jun 3	Tokyo	Yasuda Kinen	1	1,600 m (Firm)	18	10	9.3 (4)	16th	1:32.6	1.3	Masayoshi Ebina	Strong Return

Legend:
Turf

- R indicated that it was a record time finish

== Broodmare career ==
Following her retirement from racing in September 2012, Apapane was sent to Northern Farm to assume broodmare duties. As of 2026, she has produced nine foals, all of which were sired by three Makoto Kaneko-owned horses, namely Deep Impact, Black Tide and Makahiki.

Apapane's most successful progeny is Akaitorino Musume, a daughter of two Japanese Triple Crown winners who emulated her mother by winning the Shuka Sho in 2021.

c = colt, f = filly, g = gelding

No.	Name	Foaled	Sex	Color	Sire	Wins	Races	Remarks
1st	Mokulele	2014	g	Dark Bay	Deep Impact	4	27	Retired, riding horse
2nd	Jinambo	2015	c	Dark Bay	Deep Impact	4	16	Retired, riding horse
	(unfertilized)	2016			Deep Impact			
3rd	Rhinebeck	2017	g	Dark Bay	Deep Impact	5	39	Retired, riding horse
4th	Akaitorino Musume	2018	f	Dark Bay	Deep Impact	4	8	Retired, broodmare
	(not foaled)	2019			Deep Impact			
5th	Aspaldiko	2020	f	Dark Bay	Black Tide	1	6	Retired, broodmare
6th	Birdwatcher	2021	c	Dark Bay	Black Tide	2	22	Active
7th	Amakihi	2022	c	Dark Bay	Black Tide	4	12	Active
	(not foaled)	2023			Black Tide			
8th	Kukuipuka	2024	c	Bay	Makahiki			Pre-debut
9th	(Apapane 2025)	2025	f	Bay	Makahiki			

== Pedigree ==
Pedigree of Apapane (JPN), bay mare, 2007
Sire King Kamehameha (JPN) 2001	Kingmambo (USA); 1990	Mr. Prospector	Raise a Native
Sire King Kamehameha (JPN) 2001	Kingmambo (USA); 1990	Mr. Prospector	Gold Digger
Sire King Kamehameha (JPN) 2001	Kingmambo (USA); 1990	Miesque	Nureyev
Sire King Kamehameha (JPN) 2001	Kingmambo (USA); 1990	Miesque	Pasadoble
Sire King Kamehameha (JPN) 2001	Manfath (IRE); 1991	Last Tycoon	Try My Best
Sire King Kamehameha (JPN) 2001	Manfath (IRE); 1991	Last Tycoon	Mill Princess
Sire King Kamehameha (JPN) 2001	Manfath (IRE); 1991	Pilot Bird	Blakeney
Sire King Kamehameha (JPN) 2001	Manfath (IRE); 1991	Pilot Bird	The Dancer
Dam Salty Bid (USA) 2000	Salt Lake (USA); 1989	Deputy Minister	Vice Regent
Dam Salty Bid (USA) 2000	Salt Lake (USA); 1989	Deputy Minister	Mint Copy
Dam Salty Bid (USA) 2000	Salt Lake (USA); 1989	Take Lady Anne	Queen City Lad
Dam Salty Bid (USA) 2000	Salt Lake (USA); 1989	Take Lady Anne	Lovita H
Dam Salty Bid (USA) 2000	Piper Piper (USA); 1987	Spectacular Bid	Bold Bidder
Dam Salty Bid (USA) 2000	Piper Piper (USA); 1987	Spectacular Bid	Spectacular
Dam Salty Bid (USA) 2000	Piper Piper (USA); 1987	Alvarada	Hard Work
Dam Salty Bid (USA) 2000	Piper Piper (USA); 1987	Alvarada	Easterborn (family: 9-f)

== See also ==
- List of racehorses
