= Saint Emilion (horse) =

Japanese Thoroughbred racehorse

Saint Emilion サンテミリオン
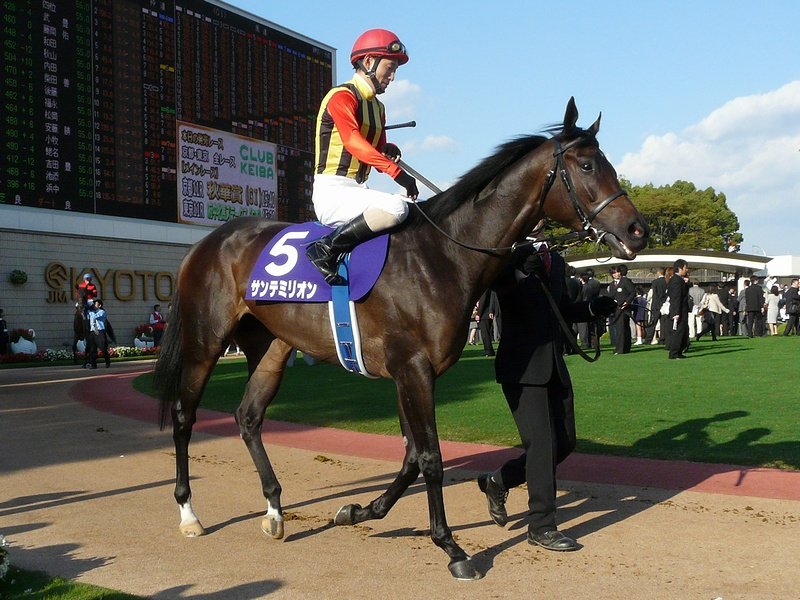
- Saint-Emillion at the 2010 Shuka Sho.
- Breed: Thoroughbred
- Sire: Zenno Rob Roy (JPN)
- Grandsire: Sunday Silence (USA)
- Dam: Moteck (FR)
- Damsire: Last Tycoon (IRE)
- Sex: Mare
- Foaled: 30 Jan 2007
- Died: 6 March 2024 (aged 17)
- Country: Japan
- Colour: Dark Bay
- Breeder: Shadai Farm
- Owner: Teruya Yoshida
- Racing colours
- Trainer: Masaaki Koga
- Jockey: Norihiro Yokoyama
- Record: 18: 4-0-1
- Earnings: 167,741,000 yen

Major wins
- Sankei Sports Sho Flora Stakes (2010); Japanese Classic Tiara Race wins: Yushun Himba (2010)

Saint Emilion (Japanese: サンテミリオン, Hepburn: Sante Mirion; 30 January 2007 - 6 March 2024) was a Japanese Thoroughbred racehorse and broodmare who won the Yushun Himba in 2010 in a historic dead heat with 2010 Japanese Fillies' Triple Crown winner Apapane.

== Background ==
Saint Emilion is a dark bay mare bred by Shadai Farm. She was sired by the 2004 Japanese Autumn Triple Crown winner Zenno Rob Roy, who finished second in the Tokyo Yushun, and International Stakes. Out of Moteck, a French-bred mare that won the Prix de Flore at Saint-Cloud in 1998 before being purchased and imported to Japan by Shadai Farm's founder, Teruya Yoshida. Saint Emilion was trained by Maasaki Koga, who also trained Asahi Rising, a mare who finished second in the 2006 Shuka Sho and American Oaks.

Her name came from the Saint-Émilion region in France, a place best known for its long history of winemaking and a UNESCO World Heritage Site.

== Racing career ==
=== 2010: three-year-old season ===
Saint Emilion made her debut on 5 January 2010, in a maiden race over 2,000 meters on turf at Nakayama Racecourse. Living up to her status as the favorite, she won her first race. In her second start, the Wakatake Sho, on January 24, she was again the third favorite but pulled away down the stretch to claim her second victory. In her third race, the Flower Cup, Saint Emilion was forced to race from the back of the pack and finished third. Her team opted to not enter her in the Oka Sho and instead set her sights on the Yushun Himba, adjusting her racing schedule accordingly. Then, in the Flora Stakes, she claimed her first graded stakes victory.

In the Yushun Himba, Saint Emilion started from the outside gate and raced in the middle-to-rear of the pack. Around one furlong out of the final straight, she engaged in a neck-and-neck battle with Apapane, and the two horses crossed the finish line side by side. After a photo finish that took nearly 15 minutes, Saint Emilion was declared a dead heat for first place with Apapane, the first such result and currently only instance in a JRA-sponsored GI race. This result gave jockey Norihiro Yokoyama his first victory in the Yushun Himba and trainer Nobuaki Koga his first GI victory. It also marked the first GI victory for a progeny of Zenno Rob Roy.

In the fall, Saint Emilion was scheduled to head straight to the Shuka Sho without running in any trial races. Since her regular jockey, Norihiro Yokoyama, had been injured in a fall, Yusuke Fujioka took over in the saddle. However, in the actual race, she suffered a mishap at the start when she bumped her face against the gate door, causing her to get off to a slow start. Additionally, because she had cut her mouth and was bleeding from the impact, she was unable to take the bit, and she remained at the very back of the field throughout the race, finishing a dismal 18th, six lengths behind the winner in a massive defeat. In the Queen Elizabeth II Cup, with her regular jockey Yokoyama riding Yuno Sophie in the Musashino Stakes, she was ridden by Mirco Demuro. Although she raced in the middle of the pack, she lacked acceleration in the home stretch and finished in 9th place.

=== 2011-2013: four to six-year-old seasons ===
In 2011, Saint Emilion began the season in the Queen Stakes; though she raced in the middle of the pack, she failed to pick up any speed in the home stretch and finished last in 14th place. In the Fuchu Himba Stakes, she raced toward the back of the middle pack but finished 11th. In the Queen Elizabeth II Cup, she remained at the back throughout the race and suffered a crushing defeat, finishing 18th.

In 2012, Saint Emilion began the season in the American Jockey Club Cup, where she ran from a good position and finished fourth. In the Diamond Stakes, she raced in the middle of the pack but failed to pick up speed in the home stretch, suffering a heavy defeat in 12th place. In the Nikkei Sho, she raced near the front but lacked acceleration in the home stretch, finishing sixth, and in the Meguro Kinen, she finished last in 18th place. She took a break during the summer and ran three more races that year, but failed to place in any of them. She retired from racing after finishing 11th in the American Jockey Club Cup in January 2013.

== Broodmare career ==
Saint Emilion was removed from the JRA racehorse registration on 22 January 2013 to become a broodmare at Shadai Farm in Chitose, Hokkaido. She produced 10 foals, none of which were successful in winning a graded race. Her offspring found limited success on Japan's regional NAR circuits.

Saint Emilion died on 6 March 2024 from an unspecified illness.

== Racing statistics ==
Saint Emilion won 4 races out of 18 entries, and placed on the podium once. This data is available based on JBIS and netkeiba.

Date	Age	Racecourse	Race	Grade	Distance; (Condition)	Entry	HN	Odds; (Favored)	Finish	Time	Winning; (Losing); Margin	Jockey	Winner; (Runner-up)
5 Jan, 2010	3	Nakayama	3yo Newcomer		2000m (Firm)	14	5	3.6 (1)	1st	2:06.1	1 1/2 lengths	Hiroyuki Uchida	(Quark Star)
24 Jan, 2010	3	Nakayama	Wakatake Sho	ALW (1W)	1800m (Firm)	9	7	4.5 (3)	1st	1:51.2	2 1/2 lengths	Norihiro Yokoyama	(Basileus)
20 Mar, 2010	3	Nakayama	Flower Cup	3	1800m (Firm)	16	9	1.6 (1)	3rd	1:50,7	(2 3/4 lengths)	Norihiro Yokoyama	Oken Sakura
25 Apr, 2010	3	Tokyo	Sankei Sports Sho Flora Stakes	2	2000m (Firm)	15	15	1.9 (1)	1st	2:00.2	1 length	Norihiro Yokoyama	(Agnes Waltz)
23 May, 2010	3	Tokyo	Yushun Himba	1	2400m (Good)	18	18	8.5 (5)	1st	2:29.9	-	Norihiro Yokoyama	Apapane (dh)
17 Oct, 2010	3	Kyoto	Shuka Sho	1	2000m (Firm)	18	5	7.9 (3)	16th	2:00.7	(13 3/4 lengths)	Yusuke Fujioka	Apapane
14 Nov, 2010	3	Kyoto	Queen Elizabeth II Commemorative Cup	1	2200m (Firm)	17	7	12.7 (5)	9th	2:14.0	(8 3/4 lengths)	Mirco Demuro	Snow Fairy
14 Aug, 2011	4	Sapporo	Hokkaido Shimbun Hai Queen Stakes	3	1800m (Firm)	14	12	24.9 (7)	14th	1:48.4	(11 1/4 lengths)	Yusuke Fujioka	Aventura
16 Oct, 2011	4	Tokyo	Fuchu Himba Stakes	2	1800m (Good)	16	11	40.4 (9)	11th	1:47.5	(4 1/2 lengths)	Kosei Miura	Italian Red
13 Nov, 2011	4	Kyoto	Queen Elizabeth II Commemorative Cup	1	2200m (Firm)	18	6	85.7 (12)	18th	2:14.0	(16 3/4 lengths)	Mirco Demuro	Snow Fairy
22 Jan, 2012	5	Nakayama	American Jockey Club Cup	2	2200m (Heavy)	11	11	114.5 (9)	4th	2:18.5	(7 1/2 lengths)	Hiroshi Kitamura	Rulership
18 Feb, 2012	5	Tokyo	Diamond Stakes	3	3400m (Firm)	16	13	33.9 (11)	12th	3:38.0	(8 1/4 lengths)	Hiroshi Kitamura	Keiai Dosojin
24 Mar, 2012	5	Nakayama	Nikkei Sho	2	2500m (Soft)	14	1	94.1 (10)	6th	2:38.7	(7 3/4 lengths)	Hiroshi Kitamura	Neko Punch
27 May, 2012	5	Tokyo	Meguro Kinen	2	2500m (Firm)	18	11	42.8 (9)	18th	2:33.7	(18 1/4 lengths)	Hiroshi Kitamura	Smart Robin
23 Sep, 2012	5	Nakayama	Sankei Sho All Comers	2	2200m (Soft)	15	10	101.8 (13)	7th	2:16.3	(5 1/4 lengths)	Kosei Miura	Nakayama Knight
18 Nov, 2012	5	Fukushima	Fukushima Kinen	3	2000m (Good)	16	3	22.5 (12)	8th	2:00.4	(5 3/4 lengths)	Yusuke Fujioka	Daiwa Falcon
15 Dec, 2012	5	Chukyo	Aichi Hai	3	2000m (Good)	18	1	46.4 (15)	18th	2:05.3	(11 lengths)	Genki Mayamura	A Shin Memphis
20 Jan, 2013	6	Nakayama	American Jockey Club Cup	2	2200m (Firm)	12	12	116.8 (10)	11th	2:15.7	(15 1/2 lengths)	Hiroshi Kitamura	Danon Ballade

== Pedigree ==
Pedigree of Saint Emilion (JPN), dark bay mare 2007
Sire Zenno Rob Roy (JPN) 2000	Sunday Silence (USA); 1986	Halo (USA); 1969	Hail to Reason (USA); 1958
Sire Zenno Rob Roy (JPN) 2000	Sunday Silence (USA); 1986	Halo (USA); 1969	Cosmah (USA); 1953
Sire Zenno Rob Roy (JPN) 2000	Sunday Silence (USA); 1986	Wishing Well (USA); 1975	Understanding (USA); 1963
Sire Zenno Rob Roy (JPN) 2000	Sunday Silence (USA); 1986	Wishing Well (USA); 1975	Mountain Flower (USA); 1964
Sire Zenno Rob Roy (JPN) 2000	Roamin Rachel (USA); 1990	Mining (USA); 1984	Mr. Prospector (USA); 1970
Sire Zenno Rob Roy (JPN) 2000	Roamin Rachel (USA); 1990	Mining (USA); 1984	I Pass (USA); 1978
Sire Zenno Rob Roy (JPN) 2000	Roamin Rachel (USA); 1990	One Smart Lady (USA); 1984	Clever Trick (USA); 1976
Sire Zenno Rob Roy (JPN) 2000	Roamin Rachel (USA); 1990	One Smart Lady (USA); 1984	Pia's Lady (USA); 1971
Dam Moteck (FR) 1995 F.no: 16-g	Last Tycoon (IRE); 1983	Try My Best (USA); 1975	Northern Dancer (CAN); 1961
Dam Moteck (FR) 1995 F.no: 16-g	Last Tycoon (IRE); 1983	Try My Best (USA); 1975	Sex Appeal (USA); 1970
Dam Moteck (FR) 1995 F.no: 16-g	Last Tycoon (IRE); 1983	Mill Princess (IRE); 1977	Mill Reef (USA); 1968
Dam Moteck (FR) 1995 F.no: 16-g	Last Tycoon (IRE); 1983	Mill Princess (IRE); 1977	Irish Lass II (GB); 1962
Dam Moteck (FR) 1995 F.no: 16-g	Sudaka (FR); 1986	Garde Royale (IRE); 1980	Mill Reef (USA); 1968
Dam Moteck (FR) 1995 F.no: 16-g	Sudaka (FR); 1986	Garde Royale (IRE); 1980	Royal Way (FR); 1969
Dam Moteck (FR) 1995 F.no: 16-g	Sudaka (FR); 1986	Didia Clara (FR); 1975	Sea Break (IRE); 1972
Dam Moteck (FR) 1995 F.no: 16-g	Sudaka (FR); 1986	Didia Clara (FR); 1975	Patria (FR); 1966

- Saint Emilion was an inbred by 4 x 4 to Mill Reef and 5 x 5 to Buckpasser (I Pass's and Sex Appeal's sire).
