= Flora Stakes =

Flora Stakes フローラステークス
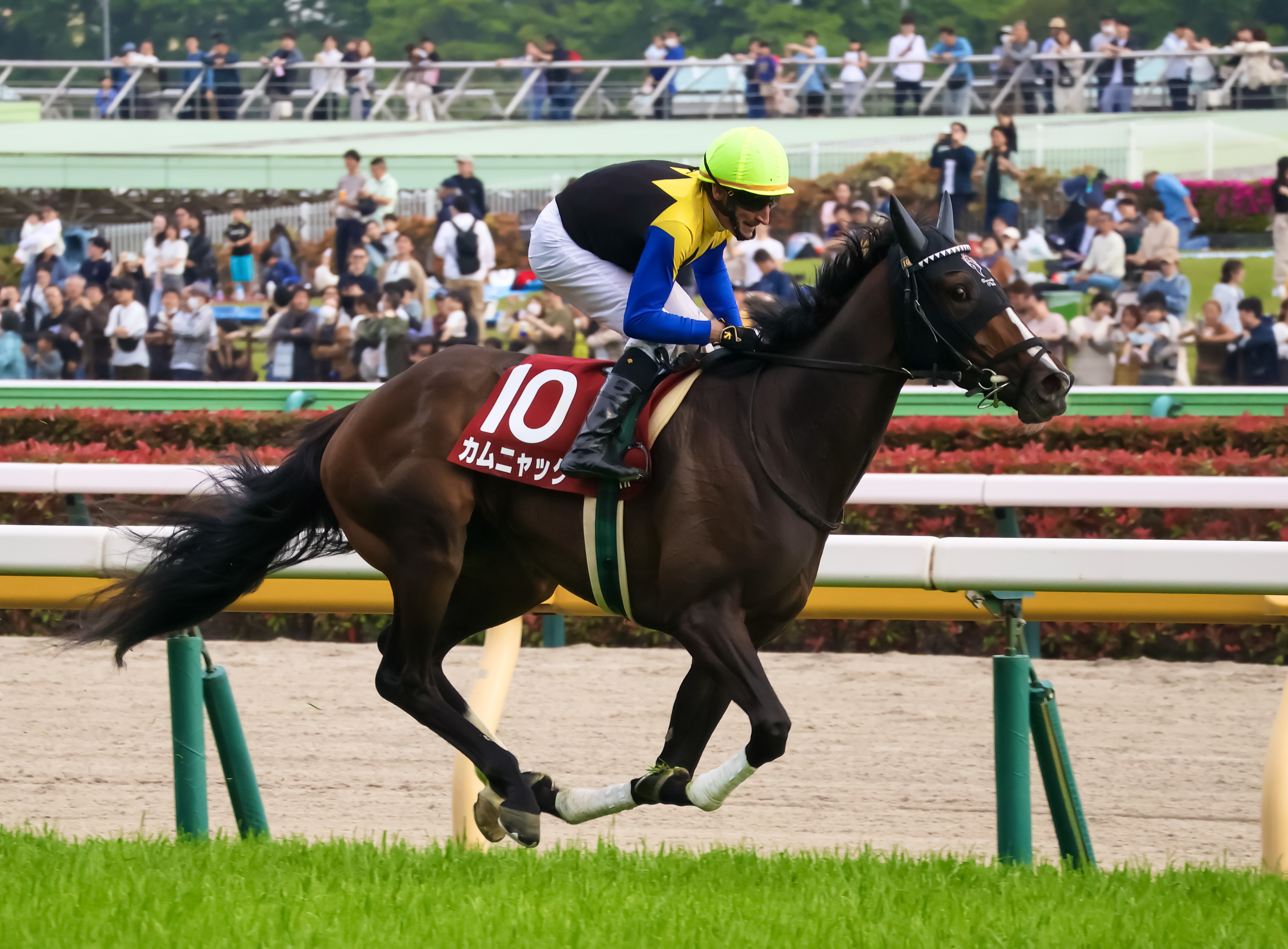
- 2025 Flora Stakes winner, Kamunyak
- Class: Grade 2
- Location: Tokyo Racecourse
- Race type: Thoroughbred Flat racing

Race information
- Distance: 2000 metres
- Surface: Turf
- Track: Left-handed
- Qualification: 3-y-o fillies
- Weight: 55 kg
- Purse: ¥ 112,520,000 (as of 2025): 1st: ¥ 52,000,000; 2nd: ¥ 21,000,000; 3rd: ¥ 13,000,000

The Flora Stakes (Japanese フローラステークス) is a Grade 2 flat horse race in Japan for three-year-old Thoroughbred fillies. It is run over a distance of 2000 metres at Tokyo Racecourse every April.

The Flora Stakes was first run in 1966 and was elevated to Grade 2 status in 1984. It serves as a trial race for the Yushun Himba, which is run in May. Until 1990, horses that finished within the top five were allowed slots to enter in to the Yushun Himba, but only the top three were allowed preferential slots between 1991 and 2017, and since 2018 only the winner and second place have slots for the Yushun Himba.

== Winners since 2000 ==
| Year | Winner | Jockey | Trainer | Owner | Time |
|---|---|---|---|---|---|
| 2000 | Manic Sunday | Jiro Ono | Takao Nakano | Teruya Yoshida | 2:02.5 |
| 2001 | Oiwake Hikari | Junichi Kobayashi | Isamu Shibasaki | Naka Hashimoto | 2:01.5 |
| 2002 | Nishino Hanaguruma | Seiji Shimohama | Koji Kayano | Nishiyama Farm | 2:04.0 |
| 2003 | Shinko Ruby | Hiroshi Gohara | Sachio Yukubo | Masatsugu Toyohara | 2:00.6 |
| 2004 | Meisho Oscar | Hiroki Goto | Akio Adachi | Yoshio Matsumoto | 2:01.1 |
| 2005 | Dia de la Novia | Yutaka Take | Katsuhiko Sumii | Carrot Farm | 2:01.8 |
| 2006 | Yamato Marian | Takanori Kikuzawa | Akio Adachi | Masako Bando | 2:01.7 |
| 2007 | Bella Rheia | Shinichiro Akiyama | Osamu Hirata | Masako Uenaka | 2:00.8 |
| 2008 | Red Agate | Hiroyuki Uchida | Yasuhito Tamura | Dearest | 2:00.5 |
| 2009 | Dear Geena | Hiroyuki Uchida | Yasuhito Tamura | Dearest | 2:02.2 |
| 2010 | Saint Emilion | Norihiro Yokoyama | Masaaki Koga | Teruya Yoshida | 2:00.2 |
| 2011 | Bouncy Tune | Kousei Miura | Toshiaki Tajima | Green Farm | 2:03.3 |
| 2012 | Midsummer Fair | Masayoshi Ebina | Futoshi Kojima | Mohammed bin Rashid Al Maktoum | 2:02.0 |
| 2013 | Denim And Ruby | Hiroyuki Uchida | Katsuhiko Sumii | Kaneko Makoto Holdings | 2:03.9 |
| 2014 | Sang Real | Yasunari Iwata | Hiroyoshi Matuda | Sunday Racing | 2:00.0 |
| 2015 | Sing With Joy | Hiroyuki Uchida | Yasuo Tomomichi | Shadai Race Horse | 2:01.8 |
| 2016 | Cecchino | Christophe Lemaire | Kazuo Fujisawa | Sunday Racing | 1:59.7 |
| 2017 | Mozu Katchan | Ryuji Wada | Ippo Sameshima | Capital System | 2:01.3 |
| 2018 | Satono Walkure | Mirco Demuro | Katsuhiko Sumii | Satomi Horse Company | 1:59.5 |
| 2019 | Victoria | Keita Tosaki | Shigeyuki Kojima | Silk Racing | 1:59.5 |
| 2020 | Win Marilyn | Takeshi Yokoyama | Takahisa Tezuka | Win | 1:58.7 |
| 2021 | Cool Cat | Christophe Lemaire | Takeshi Okumura | Silk Racing | 1:59.4 |
| 2022 | Erika Vita | Hironobu Tanabe | Sakae Kunieda | Masahiro Miki | 2:00.4 |
| 2023 | Golden Hind | Akira Sugawara | Yasuo Takeichi | Thoroughbred Club Ruffian | 1.58.9 |
| 2024 | Admire Belle | Takeshi Yokoyama | Yukihiro Kato | Junko Kondo | 1.59.0 |
| 2025 | Kamunyak | Andrasch Starke | Yasuo Tomomichi | Kaneko Makoto Holdings | 1:58.6 |
| 2026 | Laughterlines | Damian Lane | Michihiro Ogasa | Sunday Racing | 1:59.3 |

== Earlier winners ==
- 1966 - Mejiro Bosatsu
- 1967 - Chrysanthemum Lily
- 1968 - Hardware
- 1969 - Chanderi
- 1970 - Please Turf
- 1971 - Kaori Nasuno
- 1972 - Takai Homa
- 1973 - Ladies Port
- 1974 - Cash Bore
- 1975 - Toho Pearl
- 1976 - C.B. Queen
- 1977 - Meiwa Rock
- 1978 - Hirono Ski
- 1979 - Silk Ski
- 1980 - Koma Satsuki
- 1981 - Cavalieri Ace
- 1982 - Riesengross
- 1983 - Das Genie
- 1984 - Lake Victoria
- 1985 - Yukino Rose
- 1986 - Mejiro Ramonu
- 1987 - Max Beauty
- 1988 - Ara Hokuto
- 1989 - Foundry Popo
- 1990 - Kyoei Tap
- 1991 - Yamanin Marine
- 1992 - Kyowa Hoseki
- 1993 - Yamahisa Laurel
- 1994 - Golden Jack
- 1995 - Silent Happiness
- 1996 - Center Rising
- 1997 - Orange Peel
- 1998 - Max Can Do
- 1999 - Stinger

== See also ==
- Horse racing in Japan
- List of Japanese flat horse races
