= Deep Impact (horse) =

Japanese-bred Thoroughbred racehorse (2002–2019)

Deep Impact ディープインパクト
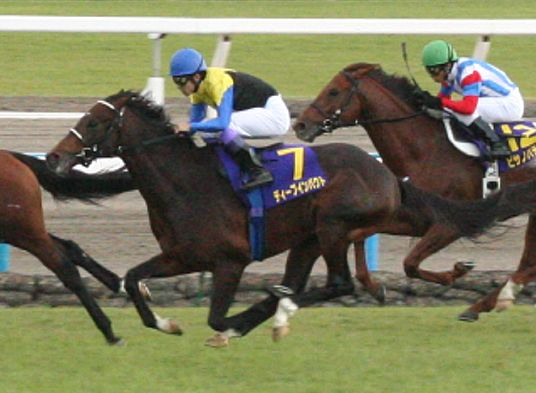
- Deep Impact winning the Kikuka Sho in 2005.
- Breed: Thoroughbred
- Sire: Sunday Silence (US)
- Grandsire: Halo (US)
- Dam: Wind in Her Hair (IRE)
- Damsire: Alzao (USA)
- Sex: Stallion
- Foaled: 25 March 2002
- Died: 30 July 2019 (aged 17)
- Country: Japan
- Colour: Bay
- Breeder: Northern Farm
- Owner: Kaneko Makoto Holdings Co.
- Racing colours
- Trainer: Yasuo Ikee
- Jockey: Yutaka Take
- Record: 14: 12–1–0
- Earnings: 1,454,551,000 JPY

Major wins
- Yayoi Sho (2005); Kobe Shimbun Hai (2005); Hanshin Daishoten (2006); Tenno Sho (Spring) (2006); Takarazuka Kinen (2006); Japan Cup (2006); Arima Kinen (2006); Japanese Classic Race wins: Satsuki Sho (2005); Tokyo Yushun (2005); Kikuka Sho (2005)

Awards
- 6th Japanese Triple Crown Champion (2005); JRA Award for Best Three-Year-Old Colt (2005); Japanese Horse of the Year (2005, 2006); JRA Award for Best Older Male Horse (2006); Leading sire in Japan (2012–2022); Leading broodmare sire in Japan (2023, 2024, 2025)

Honours
- Japan Racing Association Hall of Fame (2008); Yayoi Sho (Deep Impact Kinen); Timeform rating: 134

Deep Impact (Japanese: ディープインパクト, Hepburn: Dīpu Inpakuto; March 25, 2002 – July 30, 2019) was a Japanese Thoroughbred racehorse who won the Japanese Triple Crown in 2005 and the Japan Cup in 2006, as well as three other Grade One races in Japan. As a stallion, he was the leading sire in Japan for 11 consecutive years from 2012 to 2022, and produced Derby horses in four countries: Japan, England, France, and Ireland. In 2020, his son Contrail became the third horse in Japanese horse racing history to win the Classic Triple Crown without losing any races, becoming the first event in the world where a father and son both won the Triple Crown undefeated.

== Background ==
Deep Impact was born in Northern Farm, Abira, Hokkaido on 25 March 2002. His sire Sunday Silence took over from perennial Japanese leading sire Northern Taste (10 time leading sire in Japan) and was the leading sire in Japan 12 times. His dam, Wind in Her Hair, a Group One winner, finished second in The Oaks to super-filly Balanchine and was out of Burghclere, a daughter of dual-Classic winner Highclere, who was owned and bred by Queen Elizabeth II. Burghclere in turn was a three-quarters sister to top filly Height of Fashion, sold by the Queen to Hamdan bin Rashid Al Maktoum, and subsequently the dam of Epsom Derby winner Nashwan, leading sire Unfuwain and multiple Group One winner Nayef.

He was sold for ¥70 million by Makoto Kaneko. He was the ninth highest bidder out of the 14 Sunday Silence foals listed because of his slender stature. Kaneko was so impressed by the sparkle in his eyes that he said, "I felt like I was being sucked into his eyes," and named him "Deep Impact" in the hope that he would become a horse that would have a strong impact on many people.

== Racing career ==
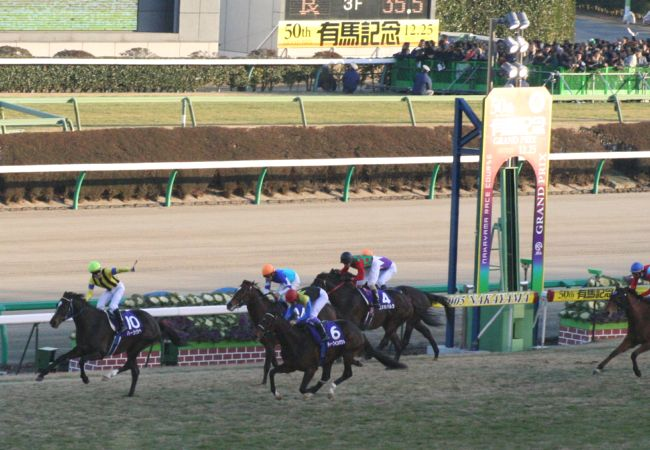
Deep Impact was defeated by Heart's Cry in the 2005 Arima Kinen, suffering his first of two losses (the other was a 3rd-place finish in the 2006 Prix de l'Arc de Triomphe, but was later disqualified to last place due to a positive drug test).

=== 2005: Three-year-old season ===
After Deep Impact won the Yayoi Sho, he was entered in the Satsuki Shō. Shortly after the start, his jockey, Yutaka Take, suddenly stumbled and almost fell off Deep Impact. However, in the straight line, he won by 2 1/2 lengths over the runner-up, Six Sense. After winning the Satsuki Sho, he went on to win the Tōkyō Yūshun (Japanese Derby) in a race record time of (2:23.3), tying King Kamehameha's record from a year earlier and becoming the sixth undefeated double champion in history and the first since Mihono Bourbon in 1992. Finally, he won the Kikuka Sho on October 23rd, 2005, becoming the first horse since Narita Brian 11 years earlier to complete the Japanese Triple Crown of Thoroughbred Racing. He also became the first undefeated Japanese Triple Crown winner since Symboli Rudolf 21 years earlier, but in his next race, the Arima Kinen, Deep Impact was beaten by Heart's Cry for the first defeat of his racing career. He was given Japanese Horse of the Year and JRA Award for Best Three-Year-Old Colt at the JRA Awards for his success in 2005.

=== 2006: Four-year-old season ===
At last year's JRA awards ceremony on January 23, Deep Impact's owner Kaneko stated that he would like to race Deep Impact if there is a good race in Europe in the summer. Thus, he expressed his intention to make an overseas expedition. His first race in 2006 was the Grade 2 race, Hanshin Daishōten. He finished 3 1/2 lengths over the runner-up.

Then he won the Tenno Sho (Spring), setting a new world record for a 3200-meter race in the time of (3'13"4)

He followed up with a victory in the Takarazuka Kinen, the Grade 1 race, over 2200m.

In October, he raced in France's most prestigious race, the Group 1 Prix de l'Arc de Triomphe over 2400m. He was the heavy favourite for the race, and 1,587,263 € (about $1,238,000) was bet on him in France (especially by many of the Japanese fans that traveled to the racecourse). However he only finished third due to having breathing problems.

Two weeks later, news from France Galop revealed that Deep Impact tested positive for Ipratropium, resulting in his disqualification. Connections announced the colt would retire to stud after that season in a syndication deal worth 5.1 billion yen. Deep Impact then won the Japan Cup and Arima Kinen before being retired to stud duties.

He was given Japanese Horse of the Year for two consecutive years and JRA Award for Best Older Male Horse at the JRA Awards for his success in 2006.

In 2008, Deep Impact was inducted into the Japan Racing Association Hall of Fame.

== Stud record ==
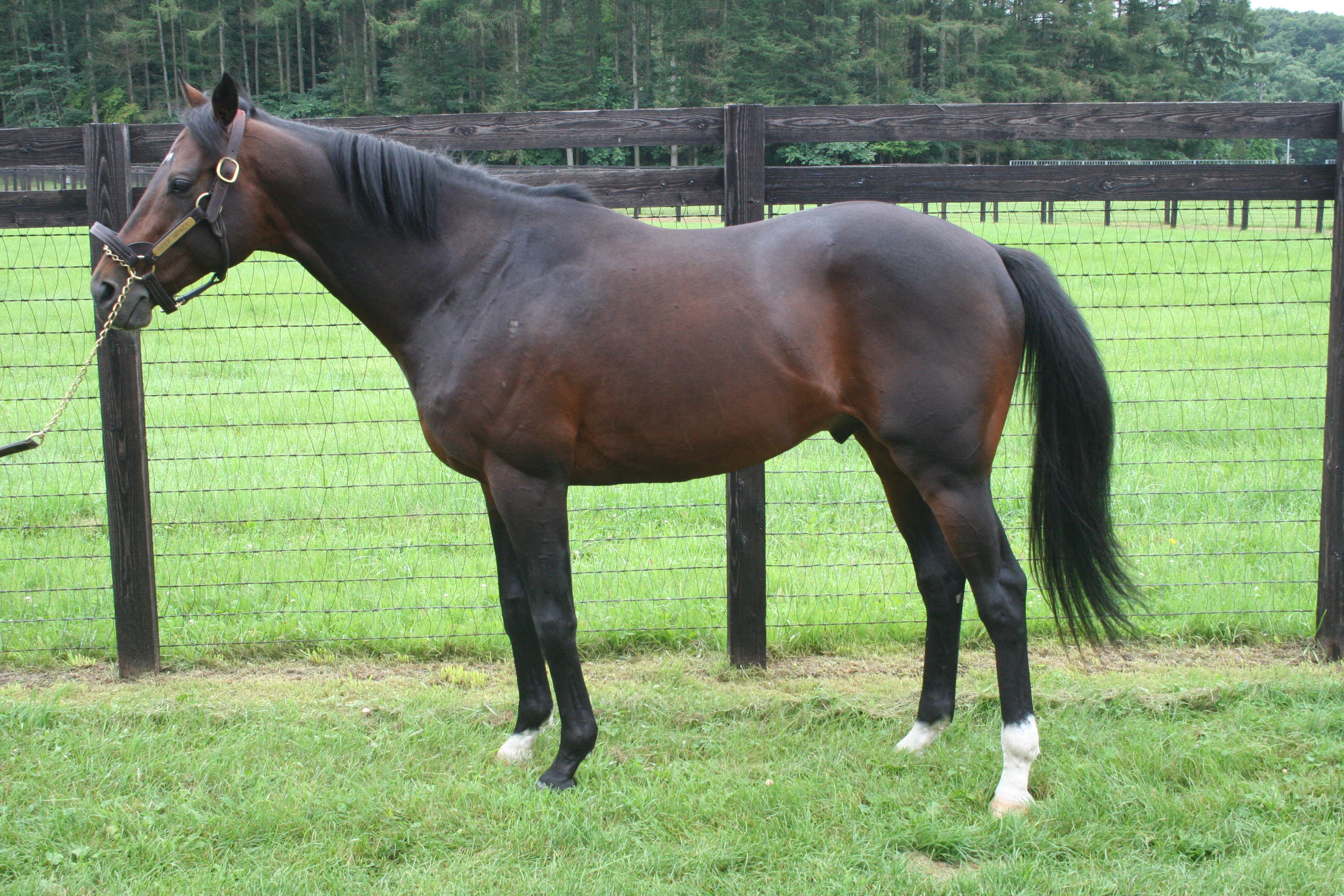
Deep Impact at the Shadai Stallion Station in 2009

Deep Impact stood at the Shadai Stallion Station in Abira, Hokkaido, where he became one of the world's most dominant stallions. He was crowned Japanese Champion Sire for 11 consecutive years, from 2012 until 2022. He fathered a total of 59 Group 1 winners, including stars such as Gentildonna, Real Steel, and A Shin Hikari. In 2020, his son Contrail completed the Japanese Triple Crown undefeated just like his sire. His last crop of runners include Auguste Rodin, who is having great success in Europe and North America. In addition, Deep Impact is the damsire of Kiseki (2017 Kikuka Sho), Blowout (2021 First Lady Stakes), Geraldina (2022 QE II Cup), Dolce More (2022 Asahi Hai Futurity Stakes), Masquerade Ball (2025 Tenno Sho (Autumn)) and Point Of Law (2026 Melbourne Cup). Deep Impact's Grandson, Forever Young became the first Japanese born and trained horse to win the USA Breeders' Cup Classic race in 2025.

c = colt, f = filly

Foaled	Name	Sex	Major Wins
2008	Danon Shark	c	Mile Championship
2008	Marcellina	f	Oka Sho
2008	Real Impact	c	Yasuda Kinen, George Ryder Stakes
2008	Tosen Ra	c	Mile Championship
2009	Beauty Parlour (GB)	f	Poule d'Essai des Pouliches
2009	Deep Brillante	c	Tokyo Yushun (Derby)
2009	Gentildonna	f	Triple Tiara (Oka Sho, Yushun Himba, Shuka Sho), Japan Cup (twice), Dubai Sheema Classic, Arima Kinen
2009	Joie de Vivre	f	Hanshin Juvenile Fillies
2009	Spielberg	c	Tenno Sho (Autumn)
2009	Verxina	f	Victoria Mile (twice)
2010	Ayusan	f	Oka Sho
2010	Kizuna	c	Tōkyō Yūshun
2010	Lachesis	f	Queen Elizabeth II Commemorative Cup
2011	A Shin Hikari	c	Hong Kong Cup, Prix d'Ispahan
2011	Harp Star	f	Oka Sho
2011	Marialite	f	Queen Elizabeth II Commemorative Cup, Takarazuka Kinen
2011	Mikki Isle	c	NHK Mile Cup, Mile Championship
2011	Satono Aladdin	c	Yasuda Kinen
2011	Shonan Pandora	f	Shuka Sho, Japan Cup
2011	Tosen Stardom	c	Toorak Handicap, Mackinnon Stakes
2012	Real Steel	c	Dubai Turf
2012	Danon Platina	c	Asahi Hai Futurity Stakes
2012	Mikki Queen	f	Yushun Himba, Shuka Sho
2012	Shonan Adela	f	Hanshin Juvenile Fillies
2013	Dee Majesty	c	Satsuki Shō
2013	Makahiki	c	Tokyo Yushun
2013	Sinhalite	f	Yushun Himba
2013	Vivlos	f	Shuka Sho, Dubai Turf
2013	Satono Diamond	c	Kikuka Sho, Arima Kinen
2013	Jour Polaire	f	Victoria Mile
2014	Satono Ares	c	Asahi Hai Futurity Stakes
2014	Al Ain	c	Satsuki Shō, Ōsaka Hai
2014	Fierce Impact	c	Toorak Handicap, Cantala Stakes, Makybe Diva Stakes
2015	Glory Vase	c	Hong Kong Vase (twice)
2015	Saxon Warrior	c	Racing Post Trophy, 2000 Guineas
2015	Danon Premium	c	Asahi Hai Futurity Stakes
2015	Keiai Nautique	c	NHK Mile Cup
2015	Wagnerian	c	Tokyo Yushun
2015	Study of Man (FRA)	c	Prix du Jockey Club
2015	Fierement	c	Kikuka Sho, Tenno Sho (Spring) (twice)
2016	Danon Fantasy	f	Hanshin Juvenile Fillies
2016	Danon Kingly	c	Yasuda Kinen
2016	Gran Alegria	f	Oka Sho, Yasuda Kinen, Sprinters Stakes, Mile Championship (twice), Victoria Mile
2016	Loves Only You	f	Yushun Himba, Queen Elizabeth II Cup (Hong Kong), Breeders' Cup Filly & Mare Turf, Hong Kong Cup
2016	Roger Barows	c	Tokyo Yūshun
2016	World Premiere	c	Kikuka-shō, Tenno Sho (Spring)
2017	Fancy Blue (IRE)	f	Prix de Diane, Nassau Stakes
2017	Contrail	c	Hopeful Stakes, Japanese Triple Crown (Satsuki Sho, Tokyo Yushun, Kikuka Sho), Japan Cup
2017	Lei Papale	f	Ōsaka Hai
2017	Potager	c	Ōsaka Hai
2018	Akaitorino Musume	f	Shuka Sho
2018	Glint Of Hope (AUS)	f	Australasian Oaks
2018	Profondo (AUS)	c	Spring Champion Stakes
2018	Shahryar	c	Tokyo Yushun, Dubai Sheema Classic
2018	Snowfall	f	Epsom Oaks, Irish Oaks, Yorkshire Oaks
2019	Justin Palace	c	Tenno Sho (Spring)
2019	Killer Ability	c	Hopeful Stakes
2019	Ask Victor More	c	Kikuka Sho
2020	Auguste Rodin (IRE)	c	Vertem Futurity Trophy, Epsom Derby, Irish Derby, Irish Champion Stakes, Breeders' Cup Turf, Prince of Wales's Stakes

== Death ==
On 30 July 2019, Deep Impact was euthanized after suffering a cervical fracture. The 2019 Japan Cup was named the Deep Impact Memorial. The news of his death was also reported in France. The day after receiving the news of his death, the newspaper Paris-Turf published a front page article with a photo of him at the Prix de l'Arc de Triomphe and reported that he was "a true idol". The newspaper Jour de Galop reported his death with the headline "Sayonara, Deep Impact," saying he was "a special presence in Japan that transcended the boundaries of a racehorse".

== Racing form ==
Deep Impact won 12 races and placed second once out of 14 starts. The data available is based on JBIS and netkeiba.

Date	Course	Race	Class	Distance (Condition)	Field	Odds (Favored)	Finish	Time	Winning (Losing) Margin	Jockey	Winner (2nd Place)	Ref
2004 – two-year-old season
Dec 19	Hanshin	Two Year Old Debut		Turf 2,000 m (Firm)	9	1.1 (1st)	1st	2:03.8	4 lengths	Yutaka Take	(Kongo Rikishio)	
2005 – three-year-old season
Jan 22	Kyoto	Wakagoma Stakes	OP	Turf 2,000 m (Firm)	7	1.1 (1st)	1st	2:00.8	5 lengths	Yutaka Take	(Keiai Hennessy)	
Mar 6	Nakayama	Yayoi Sho	GII	Turf 2,000 m (Firm)	10	1.2 (1st)	1st	2:02.2	neck	Yutaka Take	(Admire Japan)	
Apr 17	Nakayama	Satsuki Sho	GI	Turf 2,000 m (Firm)	18	1.3 (1st)	1st	1:59.2	2 1/2 lengths	Yutaka Take	(Six Sense)	
May 29	Tokyo	Tokyo Yushun	GI	Turf 2,400 m (Firm)	18	1.1 (1st)	1st	2:23.3	5 lengths	Yutaka Take	(Inti Raimi)	
Sep 25	Hanshin	Kobe Shimbun Hai	GII	Turf 2,000 m (Firm)	13	1.1 (1st)	1st	1:58.4	2 1/2 lengths	Yutaka Take	(Six Sense)	
Oct 23	Kyoto	Kikuka Sho	GI	Turf 3,000 m (Firm)	16	1.0 (1st)	1st	3:04.6	2 lengths	Yutaka Take	(Admire Japan)	
Dec 25	Nakayama	Arima Kinen	GI	Turf 2,500 m (Firm)	16	1.3 (1st)	2nd	2:32.0	(1/2 length)	Yutaka Take	Heart's Cry	
2006 – four-year-old season
Mar 19	Hanshin	Hanshin Daishoten	GII	Turf 3,000 m (Good)	9	1.1 (1st)	1st	3:08.8	3 1/2 lengths	Yutaka Take	(Tokai Trick)	
Apr 30	Kyoto	Tenno Sho (Spring)	GI	Turf 3,200 m (Firm)	17	1.1 (1st)	1st	R3:13.4	3 1/2 lengths	Yutaka Take	(Lincoln)	
Jun 25	Kyoto	Takarazuka Kinen	GI	Turf 2,200 m (Good)	13	1.1 (1st)	1st	2:13.0	4 lengths	Yutaka Take	(Narita Century)	
Oct 1	Longchamp	Prix de l'Arc de Triomphe	GI	Turf 2,400 m (Good)	8	3.25 (1st)	DSQ			Yutaka Take	Rail Link	
Nov 26	Tokyo	Japan Cup	GI	Turf 2,400 m (Firm)	11	1.3 (1st)	1st	2:25.1	2 lengths	Yutaka Take	(Dream Passport)	
Dec 24	Nakayama	Arima Kinen	GI	Turf 2,500 m (Firm)	14	1.2 (1st)	1st	2:31.9	3 lengths	Yutaka Take	(Pop Rock)	

- R indicated that it was a record time finish.

== Pedigree ==
Pedigree of Deep Impact (JPN), bay stallion 2002
Sire Sunday Silence (USA) 1986	Halo (USA); 1969	Hail To Reason	Turn-To
Sire Sunday Silence (USA) 1986	Halo (USA); 1969	Hail To Reason	Nothirdchance
Sire Sunday Silence (USA) 1986	Halo (USA); 1969	Cosmah	Cosmic Bomb
Sire Sunday Silence (USA) 1986	Halo (USA); 1969	Cosmah	Almahmoud
Sire Sunday Silence (USA) 1986	Wishing Well (USA); 1975	Understanding	Promised Land
Sire Sunday Silence (USA) 1986	Wishing Well (USA); 1975	Understanding	Pretty Ways
Sire Sunday Silence (USA) 1986	Wishing Well (USA); 1975	Mountain Flower	Montparnasse
Sire Sunday Silence (USA) 1986	Wishing Well (USA); 1975	Mountain Flower	Edel Weiss
Dam Wind in Her Hair (IRE) 1991	Alzao (USA); 1980	Lyphard	Northern Dancer
Dam Wind in Her Hair (IRE) 1991	Alzao (USA); 1980	Lyphard	Goofed
Dam Wind in Her Hair (IRE) 1991	Alzao (USA); 1980	Lady Rebecca	Sir Ivor
Dam Wind in Her Hair (IRE) 1991	Alzao (USA); 1980	Lady Rebecca	Pocahontas
Dam Wind in Her Hair (IRE) 1991	Burghclere (GB); 1977	Busted	Crepello
Dam Wind in Her Hair (IRE) 1991	Burghclere (GB); 1977	Busted	Sans Le Sou
Dam Wind in Her Hair (IRE) 1991	Burghclere (GB); 1977	Highclere	Queen's Hussar
Dam Wind in Her Hair (IRE) 1991	Burghclere (GB); 1977	Highclere	Highlight (Family 2-f)
