= Norihiro Yokoyama =

Japanese jockey

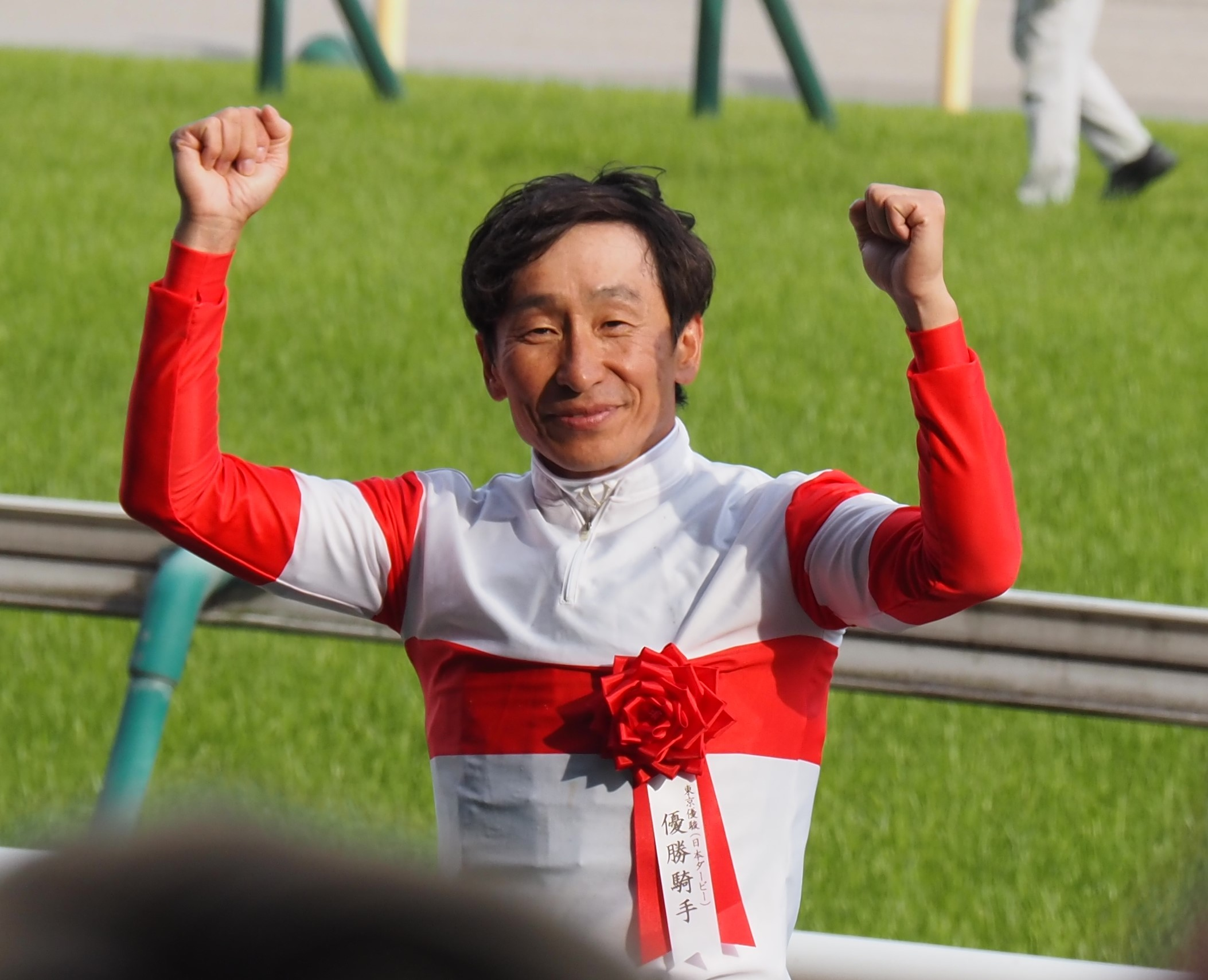
- Norihiro Yokoyama after winning the 91st Tokyo Yushun (2024)

Personal information
- Native name: 横山典弘
- Nationality: Japanese
- Born: February 23, 1968 (age 58) Fuchu, Tokyo, Japan
- Occupation: Jockey
- Height: 163 cm (5 ft 4 in)
- Weight: 49 kg (108 lb)
- Children: 3 (incl. Kazuo and Takeshi)

Horse racing career
- Sport: Horse racing
- Career wins: 2999

Significant horses
- Mejiro Ryan, Trot Thunder, Hokuto Vega, Sakura Laurel, Black Hawk, Seiun Sky, Ingrandire, Logi Universe, Saint Emilion, Gold Ship, One And Only, Aerolithe, Danon Decile

Norihiro Yokoyama (Japanese: 横山典弘; Born February 23, 1968) is a Japanese jockey. As of August 2026, he is the second-oldest jockey in Japan to win a Grade I race, after Yutaka Take.

== Background ==
Norihiro was born in a family heavily involved in horse racing, with his father, Tomio being a jockey, as well as his elder brother Yoshikazu being a retired jockey and teacher at the Horse Racing School. Two of Norihiro's sons, Kazuo, and Takeshi, are also jockeys.

== Career ==
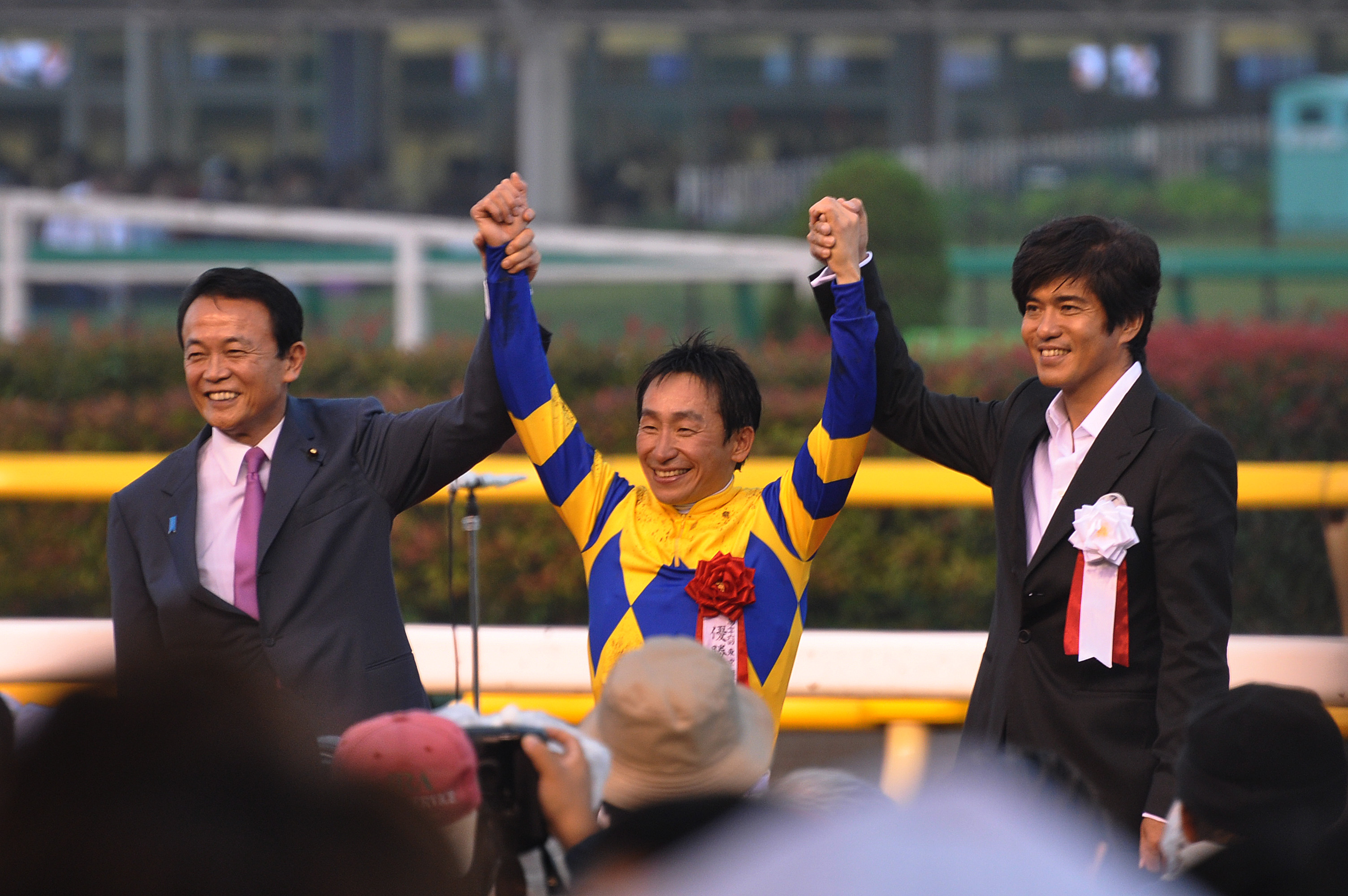
Norihiro at the awards ceremony following the 76th Tokyo Yushun (2009). From left to right: Taro Aso, Norihiro Yokoyama, and Koichi Sato

Norihiro started racing on March 1, 1986, and won his first race with Kioi God on April 29, 1986. He won his first GI race with Kyoei Tap in the 1990 Queen Elizabeth II Cup, and would go on to win the Takarazuka Kinen the following year with Mejiro Ryan.

Norihiro became a Derby jockey in 2009, after 15 starts at the Derby in his 24 year long career, when he won the Japanese Derby with Logi Universe. Later that year, on July 18, Norihiro won his 2000th JRA win, the fifth JRA jockey to ever do so, when he won an allowance race held at Sapporo Racecourse with Sugino Blade.

In 2010, Norihiro won the Yushun Himba in a dead heat against Apapane with Saint Emilion, which was the first Grade I race in Japan to end in such a way.

Norihiro won his second Derby in 2014 when he won the race with One And Only. Later that year, Norihiro won his 2500th JRA win after Yutaka Take and Yukio Okabe with Clarity Sky in the inaugural race of the Icho Stakes.

On September 4, 2016, Norihiro became the fourth jockey to win a graded race on all 10 JRA racecourses following his victory with A Day in the Life at the Niigata Kinen (GIII).

On September 2, 2023, Norihiro rode Power Hall at the Sapporo Nisai Stakes. He finished 2nd in that race, but Takeshi won the same race, marking the first time in JRA history where a father and son finished first and second in a graded race. The following week, the reverse occurred on that year's Shion Stakes where Norihiro won the race with Moryana while Takeshi came in second. This victory also made Norihiro, at age 55, the eldest jockey to have won a JRA graded race, previously held by Yoshitomi Shibata when he won the Leopard Stakes in 2021.

On January 14, 2024, Norihiro broke his own record of the eldest JRA jockey to win a graded race when he won the Keisei Hai with Danon Decile. This race was also the third graded race ever where a father and son finished in first and second place, as Takeshi came in second with Urban Chic. On May 5 of that year, Norihiro won his 2944th race at an allowance race at Niigata Racecourse with Hawaiian Time, overtaking Yukio Okabe's previously held 2943 wins to become the JRA jockey with the second most win after Yutaka Take.

On May 26, 2024, Norihiro won his third Derby ever with Danon Decile. This was the eldest jockey ever to win Japanese Derby and Grade I, surpassing Yutaka Take's previous record.

== Major wins ==
- Arima Kinen – (1) – Sakura Laurel (1996)
- Asahi Hai Sansai Stakes – (1) – Mejiro Bailey (2000)
- Hanshin Sansai Himba Stakes – (1) – Stinger (1998)
- Japan Dirt Derby – (2) – Success Brocken (2008), Grape Brandy (2011)
- Japan Breeding Farms' Cup Sprint – (1) – Nishiken Mononofu (2017)
- Japan Breeding Farms' Cup Ladies' Classic – (1) – Ange Desir (2018)
- Kawasaki Kinen – (1) – Field Rouge (2008)
- Kikka Sho – (1) – Seiun Sky (1998)
- Mile Championship – (3) – Company (2009), Taiki Shuttle (1997), Trot Thunder (1995)
- Mile Championship Nambu Hai – (2) – Taiki Sherlock (1997), Utopia (2004)
- NHK Mile Cup – (3) – Aerolithe (2017), Clarity Sky (2015), Symboli Indy (1999)
- Queen Elizabeth II Cup – (1) – Kyoei Tap (1990)
- Satsuki Sho – (1) – Seiun Sky (1998)
- Sprinters Stakes – (1) – Black Hawk (1999)
- Takarazuka Kinen – (2) – Mejiro Ryan (1991), Gold Ship (2014)
- Tenno Sho (Autumn) – (1) – Company (2009)
- Tenno Sho (Spring) – (3) – Gold Ship (2015), Ingrandire (2004), Sakura Laurel (1996)
- Tokyo Yushun – (3) – Danon Decile (2024), One And Only (2014), Logi Universe (2009)
- Victoria Mile – (2) – Buena Vista (2010), Whale Capture (2012)
- Yasuda Kinen – (2) – Black Hawk (2001), Trot Thunder (1996)
- Yushun Himba – (1) – Saint Emilion (2010)

== Awards and honours ==
- Medal with Yellow Ribbon (2025)
