= Sakae Kunieda =

Japanese horse trainer

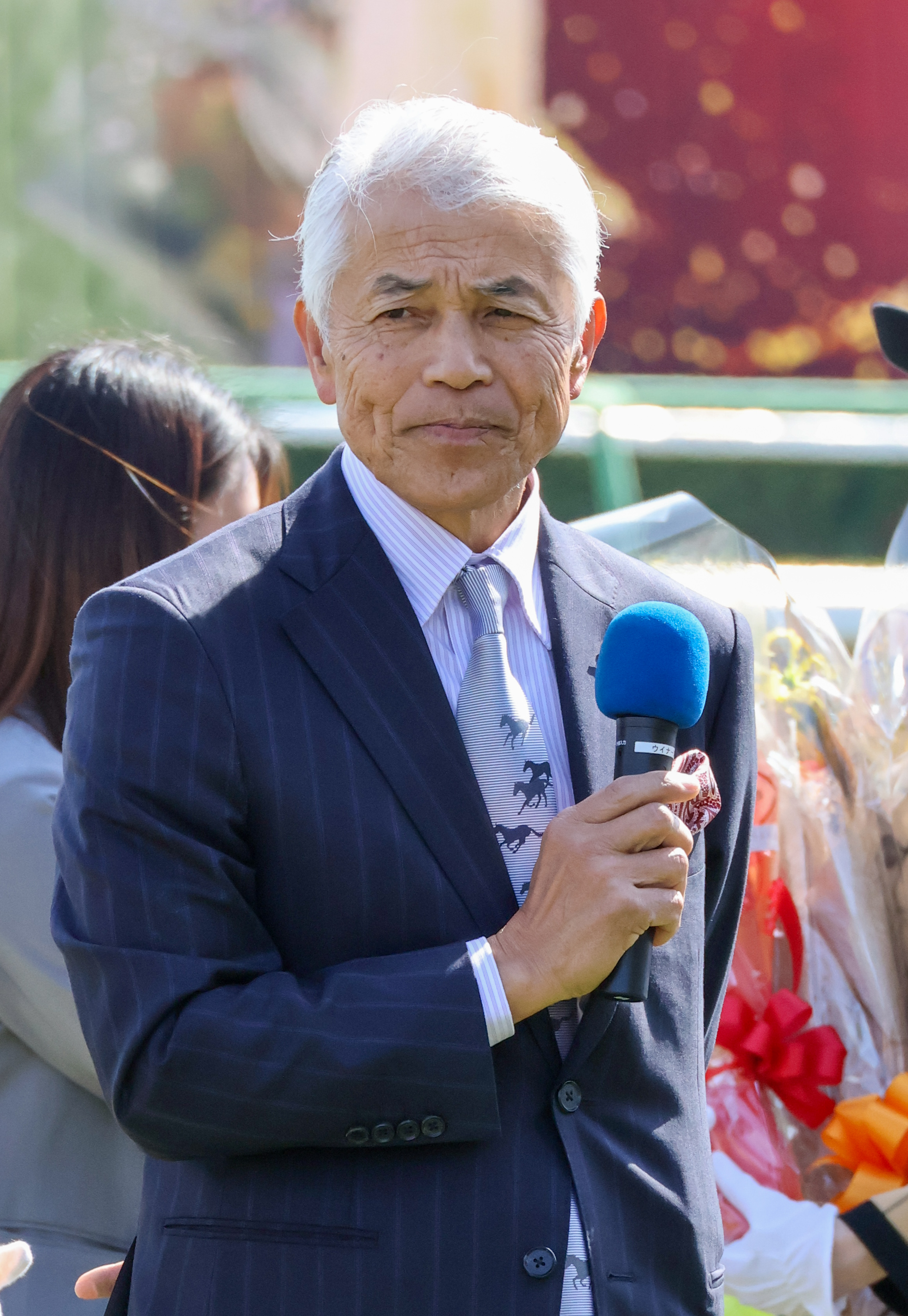
- Kunieda at his retirement ceremony (2026, Nakayama Racecourse)

Personal information
- Native name: 国枝栄
- Born: April 14, 1955 (age 71) Kitagata, Gifu, Japan
- Occupation: Horse trainer

Horse racing career
- Sport: Horse racing
- Career wins: 1123 (JRA)

Honors
- Japan Racing Association Hall of Fame (2026)

Significant horses
- Almond Eye, Akaitorino Musume, Apapane, Black Hawk, Circle of Life, Danon Platina, Matsurida Gogh, Meiner Kitz, Pink Cameo, Stellenbosch

Sakae Kunieda (国枝栄; born 14 April 1955, in Kitagata, Gifu) is a retired Japanese horse trainer. Dubbed "the Kunieda of fillies", he is most known for winning 12 Grade I races for fillies and mares, as well as training two Triple Tiara winners; Apapane in 2010 and Almond Eye in 2018.

== Career ==
Kunieda grew interest in horse racing when during middle school, having a friend who was also in to the sport. During high school, he grew to desire wanting to take up a job related to horses, choosing to enroll in the Cooperative Department of Veterinary Medicine of the Tokyo University of Agriculture and Technology, where he would join the university's equestrian club.

Kunieda would join Akiyoshi Yamazaki's stable in 1978 as an assistant trainer after he was introduced to the trainer by Yu Takahashi, who he had known from his equestrain activities. He would earn his trainer license in 1989 and open his stable at Miho Training Center the following year.

Kunieda would have his first graded race win with Black Hawk, when they won the 1998 Lord Derby Challenge Trophy. The two would also have their first Grade I race victory when they won the 1999 Sprinters Stakes.

In 2010, Kunieda won the Triple Tiara (Oka Sho, Yushun Himba, and Shūka Sho) with Apapane.

In 2018, Kunieda became the first trainer in Japan to win either the Triple Crown or Tiara multiple times when he won the Triple Tiara with Almond Eye.

On 2 July 2022, Kunieda became the 15th trainer in JRA history, and the only active JRA horse trainer, to win his 1,000th race.

On 13 April 2025, Kunieda became the 10th trainer in JRA history to win his 1,100th race. The horse that he won the race with, Bird Watcher, was foaled by Apapane.

Kunieda retired on 3 March 2026, as he would reach the retirement age of 70 that year. Three months after his retirement, he was inducted to the Japan Racing Association Hall of Fame as a trainer.

== Major wins ==
Japan

- Asahi Hai Futurity Stakes - (1) - Danon Platina (2014)
- Arima Kinen - (1) - Matsurida Gogh (2007)
- Hanshin Juvenile Fillies - (2) - Apapane (2009), Circle of Life (2021)
- Japan Cup - (2) - Almond Eye (2018, 2020)
- NHK Mile Cup - (1) - Pink Cameo (2007)
- Oka Sho - (3) - Apapane (2010), Almond Eye (2018), Stellenbosch (2024)
- Shūka Sho - (3) - Apapane (2010), Almond Eye (2018), Akaitorino Musume (2021)
- Sprinters Stakes - (1) - Black Hawk (1999)
- Tennō Shō (Spring) - (1) - Meiner Kitz (2009)
- Tennō Shō (Autumn) - (2) - Almond Eye (2019, 2020)
- Victoria Mile - (2) - Apapane (2011), Almond Eye (2020)
- Yasuda Kinen - (1) - Black Hawk (2001)
- Yushun Himba - (2) - Apapane (2010), Almond Eye (2018)

(United Arab Emirates) UAE

- Dubai Turf - (1) - Almond Eye (2019)

== Personal life ==
Two of his sons, Jun and Sho, worked as grooms at his father's stable.
