= Makoto Kaneko (businessman) =

Japanese businessman and racehorse owner

- 金子 真人
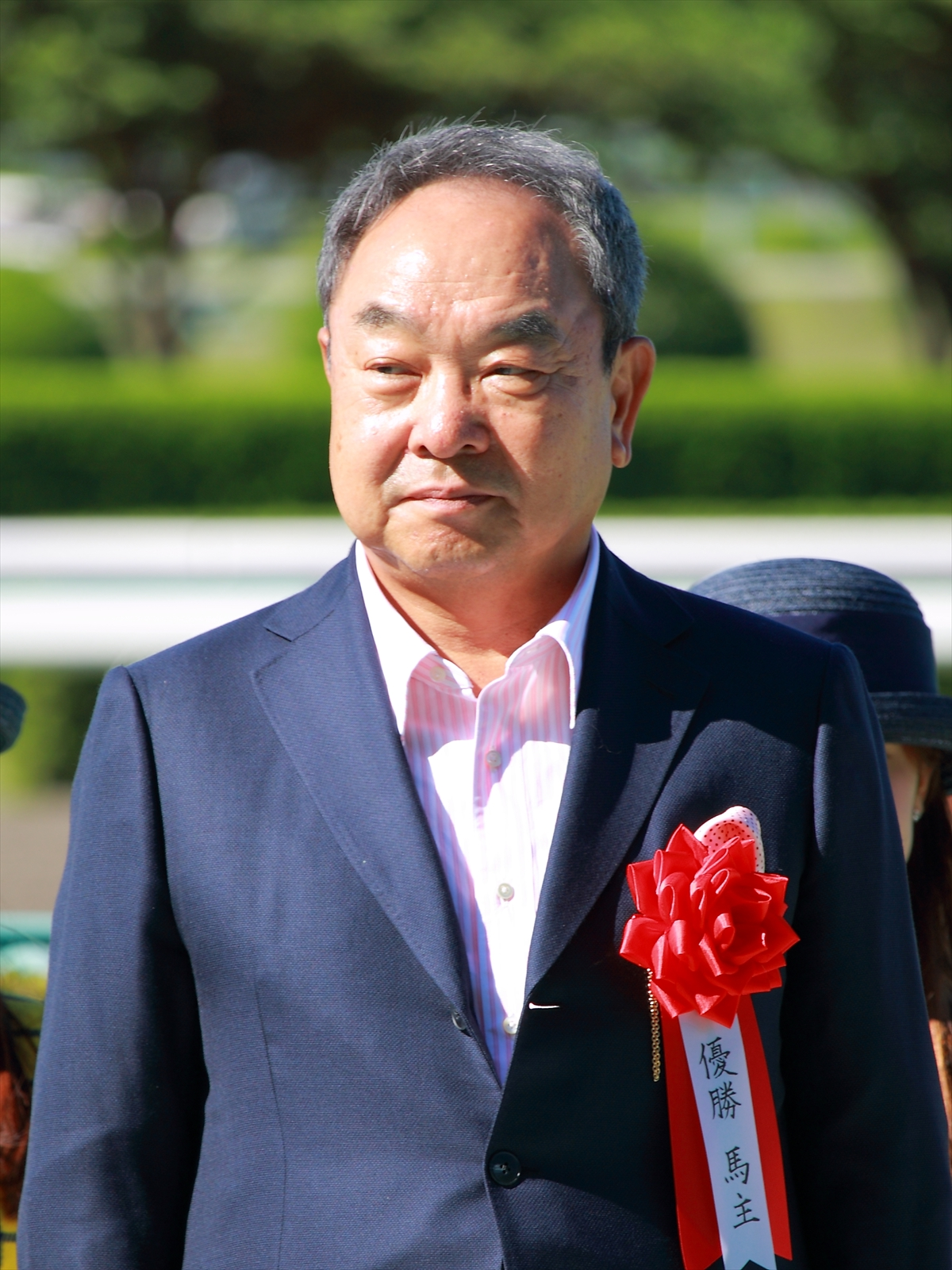
- Kaneko at the Awards Ceremony of the 2015 Naruo Kinen
- Born: 15 March 1945 (age 81); Tokyo, Japan
- Education: Waseda University
- Known for: President and CEO of Zuken, successful racehorse owner

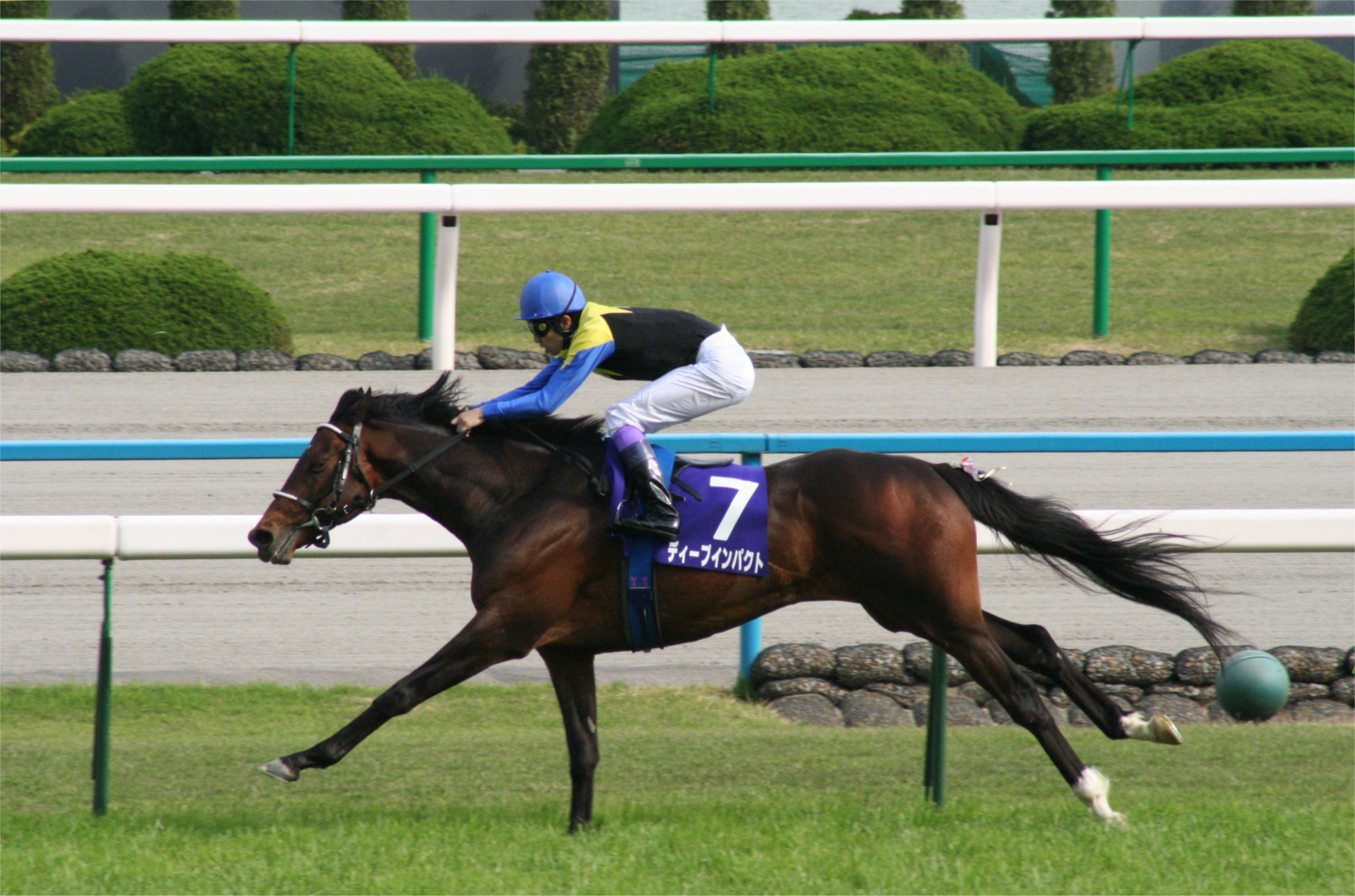
Deep Impact

Makoto Kaneko (金子真人, Kaneko Makoto; born March 15, 1945 in Tokyo) is the founder, President, CEO and Representative Director of Zuken Inc., a public listed multinational corporation in the Tokyo Stock Exchange. He also owns the exclusive King Kamehameha Golf Club in Hawaii.

Makoto Kaneko is better known as a prominent horse owner in Japan. He was the owner of Deep Impact, one of the most famous racehorses in Japanese history. Kaneko has also become the first racehorse owner to win all of the 8 major races of Japan as well as the Japan Cup.

== Makoto Kaneko's famous racehorses ==
Kaneko's racing silk

- Black Hawk

He won the Sprinters Stakes and the Yasuda Kinen.

- Kurofune

He has four course records. Because of his strength, He was called "White Secretariat".

- To the Victory

She won the Queen Elizabeth II Commemorative Cup and challenged the Dubai World Cup twice. Her younger brother Silent Deal is also Makoto's horse.

- Utopia

He was traded to Godolphin Racing.

- King Kamehameha

He won the Tokyo Yushun (Japanese Derby) for the first time as Kaneko's horse.

- Kane Hekili

He was also one of the strongest dirt-horses in Japan. He won seven GI dirt-races.

- Black Tide

While he saw little success as a racehorse due to his injuries, he nonetheless entered stud duty and sired Kitasan Black and Kamunyak.

- Deep Impact

He won 7 GI races including the Japanese Triple Crown in 2005, and challenged the Prix de l'Arc de Triomphe held in 2006, before retiring and siring many successful racehorses, most notably Gentildonna, Kizuna, Real Steel, Loves Only You, Gran Alegria, and Contrail.

- White Vessel

He was the first white horse in Japan Racing Association history to win a race. His father is Kurofune and mother is Shirayukihime who is also a white horse; White Vessel is a full brother of Yukichan.

- Yukichan

She was the first white horse in Japan Racing Association history to win a graded race.

- Apapane

She won the Japanese Fillies' Triple Crown in 2010.

- Lovely Day

Winner of the 2015 Takarazuka Kinen and Tenno Sho (Autumn)

- Makahiki

Winner of the 2016 Japanese Derby.

- Wagnerian

Winner of the 2018 Japanese Derby.

- Sodashi

The first white horse to win a Grade 1 race. Sire is Kurofune and dam is Buchiko, progeny of Shirayukihime.

- Akaitorino Musume

Foaled by Apapane and sired by Deep Impact, she became the winner of the 2021 Shuka Sho.

- Potager

Winner of the 2022 Osaka Hai.

- Mama Cocha

Full sister of Sodashi and winner of the 2023 Sprinters Stakes

- Kamunyak

Winner of the 2025 Yushun Himba.
