= Yushun Himba =

Yushun Himba Japanese Oaks 優駿牝馬 オークス
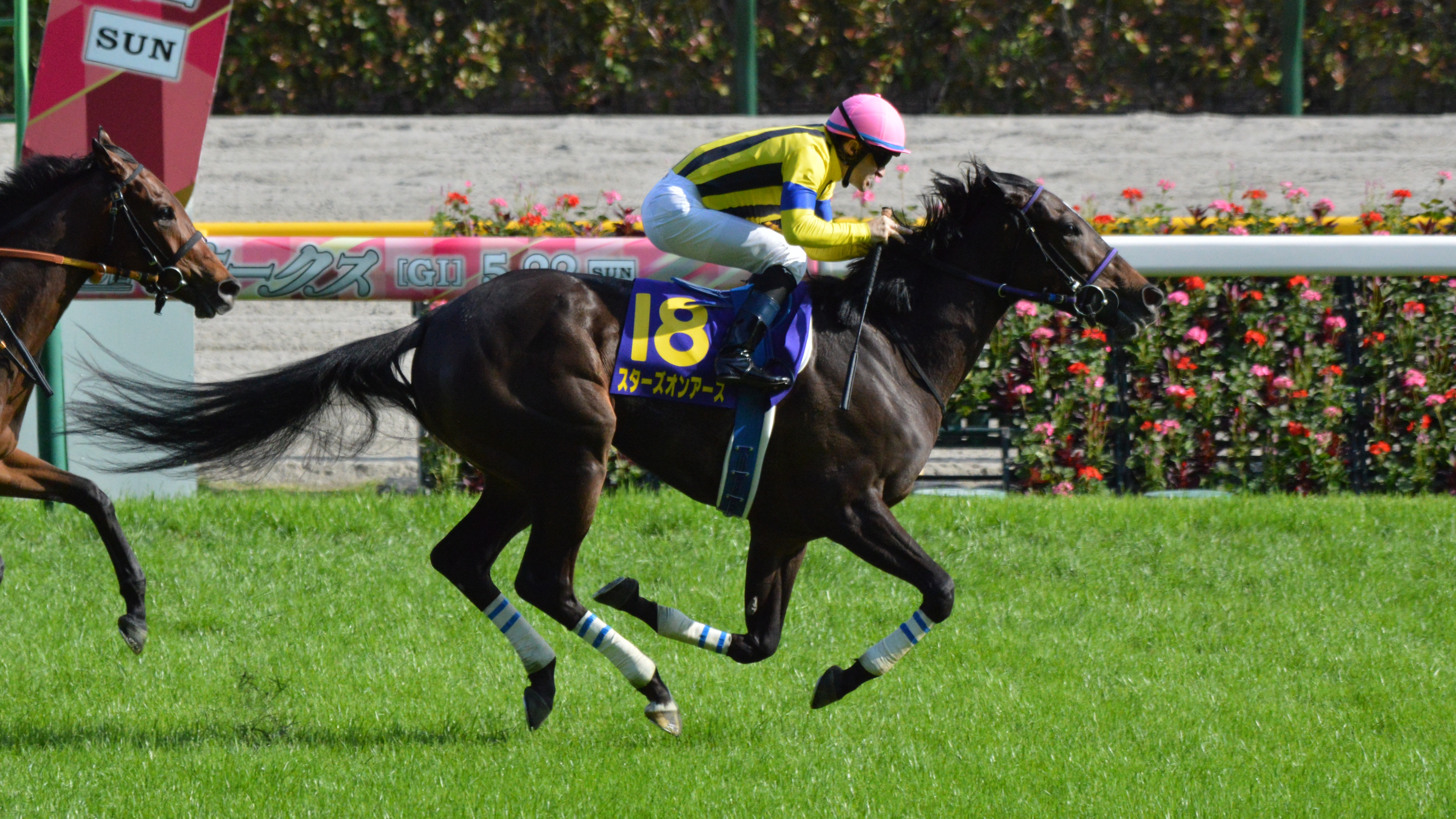
- 2022 Yushun Himba winner Stars On Earth
- Class: Grade 1
- Location: Tokyo Racecourse, Fuchū, Tokyo
- Inaugurated: November 23, 1938
- Race type: Thoroughbred Flat racing

Race information
- Distance: 2400 meters
- Surface: Turf
- Track: Left-handed
- Qualification: 3-y-o, Fillies
- Weight: 55 kg
- Purse: ¥ 324,500,000 (as of 2025): 1st: ¥ 150,000,000; 2nd: ¥ 60,000,000; 3rd: ¥ 38,000,000
- Bonuses: Fillies Triple Crown; Winner of Oka Sho, Yushun Himba, Shuka Sho ¥ 100,000,000

The Yushun Himba (優駿牝馬), also known as the Japanese Oaks (オークス) is a Japanese Grade 1 flat horse race for three-year-old thoroughbred fillies run over a distance of 2,400 metres (approximately 1 mile 4 furlongs) at the Tokyo Racecourse, Fuchū, Tokyo in May.

== History ==
The Yūshun Himba was first contested in 1938 as Hanshin Yūshun Himba (阪神優駿牝馬) at Naruo Racecourse in Nishinomiya, Hyogo, and it is regarded as the Japanese equivalent of the English Epsom Oaks.

Race distance was first set to 2,700 metres and shortened to 2,450 metres in 1940, then again shortened to 2,400 metres in 1943 at Kyoto Racecourse. After a two-year hiatus, the race was renamed to the Yūshun Himba in 1946 and it was staged at Tokyo Racecourse in Fuchu, Tokyo over a distance of 2,400 metres.

It was held in October or November in early years, then moved to mid-to-late May since 1953.

It is one of Japan's five Classic races, and the second of two restricted to fillies. It also serves as the second leg of the Japanese Triple Tiara, preceded by the Oka Shō (the Japanese equivalent of the English 1,000 Guineas) in early April, and followed by the Shūka Shō in mid-October.

Since 2010, the Yūshun Himba (along with several other JRA Japanese domestic Grade 1 races, including other Japanese classics such as the Ōka Shō, the Satsuki Shō, the Tōkyō Yūshun and the Kikuka Shō) is open to international competition due to Japan's inclusion in the International Federation of Horseracing Authorities' ICS Part I category, in which all graded black-type races in the JRA calendar are open to international competition.

On May 23, 2010, in the 71st running of the Yushun Himba, Apapane and Saint Emilion hit the finish at the same time in the race, marking the first time that a Grade 1 race in Japan resulted in a dead heat for the win.

On May 20, 2018, Almond Eye won the 2,400-meter Yushun Himba over Lily Noble by two lengths.

On May 24, 2026, jockey Seina Imamura made history by becoming the first Japanese female rider to win a flat Grade 1 race in Japan, by winning the Yushun Himba on board Juryoku Pierrot.

== Trial races ==
Trial races provide automatic berths to the winning horses or placed horses as specified.

Race	Grade	Racecourse	Distance	Condition
Oka Sho	GI	Hanshin	1,600 meters	Top 5 horses
Flora Stakes	GII	Tokyo	2,000 meters	Top 2 horses
Sweetpea Stakes	Listed	Tokyo	1,800 meters	Winner

== Other step races ==
Races listed below does not provide automatic berths, but still important steps for this race.

Race	Grade	Racecourse	Distance
Wasurenagusa Sho	Listed	Hanshin	2,000 meters

== Winners since 1971 ==
Year	Winner	Jockey	Trainer	Owner	Time
1971	Kane Himuro	Yukio Okabe	Akimitsu Narumiya	Yoshiaki Kanasashi	2:36.0
1972	Take Fubuki	Isao Shimada	Yukio Inaba	Take Kondo	2:28.8
1973	Nasuno Chigusa	Isao Shimada	Yukio Inaba	Nasuno Bokujo	2:28.9
1974	Toko Elsa	Isao Shimada	Tatsuya Nakazumi	Kihachiro Watanabe	2:29.1
1975	Tesco Gaby	Yasuo Sugawara	Yoshio Nakazumi	Tadao Nagashima	2:30.6
1976	Titania	Isao Shimada	Yukio Inaba	Hachie Hara	2:34.4
1977	Linear Queen	Yukiharu Matsuda	Yoshitaro Matsuda	Tatsuzo Oketani	2:28.1
1978	Five Hope	Tomio Yokoyama	Sueji Yamaoka	Tomio Sakakibara	2:30.2
1979	Agnes Lady	Hiroshi Kawachi	Hikosaburo Nagahama	Takao Watanabe	2:29.6
1980	Kei Kiroku	Yukio Okabe	Kuniichi Asami	Atsuko Uchida	2:32.3
1981	Temmon	Isao Shimada	Yukio Inaba	Hachie Hara	2:29.5
1982	Shadai Ivor	Kazuhiro Kato	Toshio Nihonyanagi	Zenya Yoshida	2:28.6
1983	Dyna Carle	Yukio Okabe	Hideo Takahashi	Shadai Race Horse Co	2:30.9
1984	Tokai Roman	Shunichi Okatomi	Hitoshi Nakamura	Masanori Uchimura	2:31.9
1985	Noah no Hakobune	Hidetaka Otonashi	Ryouhei Tanaka	Yuichi Odagiri	2:30.7
1986	Mejiro Ramonu	Hiroshi Kawachi	Shinji Okuhira	Mejiro Stud	2:29.6
1987	Max Beauty	Seiki Tabara	Yuji Ito	Yu Tadokoro	2:30.9
1988	Cosmo Dream	Shigefumi Kumazawa	Hiroyoshi Matsuda	Hiromi Tanabe	2:28.3
1989	Light Color	Yoshiyasu Tajima	Mitsuharu Shibata	Teruzo Ito	2:29.0
1990	Eishin Sunny	Shigehiko Kishi	Masanori Sakaguchi	Toyomitsu Hirai	2:26.1
1991	Isono Roubles	Mikio Matsunaga	Hisao Shimizu	Toshio Isono	2:27.8
1992	Adorable	Yoshiyuki Muramoto	Minoru Kobayashi	Haruo Negishi	2:28.9
1993	Vega	Yutaka Take	Hiroyoshi Matsuda	Kazuko Yoshida	2:27.3
1994	Chokai Carol	Sadahiro Kojima	Akio Tsurudome	Kaichi Nitta	2:27.5
1995	Dance Partner	Yutaka Take	Toshiaki Shirai	Katsumi Yoshida	2:26.7
1996	Air Groove	Yutaka Take	Yuji Ito	Satoshi Yoshihara	2:29.1
1997	Mejiro Dober	Yutaka Yoshida	Yokichi Okubo	Mejiro Shoji	2:27.7
1998	Erimo Excel	Hitoshi Matoba	Keiji Kato	Shinichi Yamamoto	2:28.1
1999	Umeno Fiber	Masayoshi Ebina	Ikuo Aizawa	T Umezaki	2:26.9
2000	Silk Prima Donna	Shinja Fujita	Kenji Yamauchi	Silk Racing	2:30.2
2001	Lady Pastel	Kent Desormeaux	Kiyotaka Tanaka	Lord Horse Club	2:26.3
2002	Smile Tomorrow	Yutaka Yoshida	Kazuhiro Seishi	Masatake Iida	2:27.7
2003	Still in Love	Hideaki Miyuki	Shoichi Matsumoto	North Hills Management Co.	2:27.5
2004	Daiwa El Cielo	Yuichi Fukunaga	Kunihide Matsuda	Daiwa Shoji	2:27.2
2005	Cesario	Yuichi Fukunaga	Katsuhiko Sumii	Carrot Farm Co.	2:28.8
2006	Kawakami Princess	Masaru Honda	Katsuichi Nishiura	Mitsuishi Kawakami Bokujo	2:26.2
2007	Robe Decollete	Yuichi Fukunaga	Shigeki Matsumoto	Koji Maeda	2:25.3
2008	Tall Poppy	Kenichi Ikezoe	Katsuhiko Sumii	Carrot Farm	2:28.8
2009	Buena Vista	Katsumi Ando	Hiroyoshi Matsuda	Sunday Racing	2:26.1
2010	Apapane (DH)	Masayoshi Ebina	Sakae Kunieda	Kaneko Makoto Holdings	2:29.9
2010	Saint Emilion (DH)	Norihiro Yokoyama	Masaaki Koga	Teruya Yoshida	2:29.9
2011	Erin Court	Hiroki Goto	Kazuhide Sasada	Teruya Yoshida	2:25.7
2012	Gentildonna	Yuga Kawada	Sei Ishziaka	Sunday Racing	2:23.6
2013	Meisho Mambo	Koshiro Take	Akihiro Iida	Yoshio Matsumoto	2:25.2
2014	Nuovo Record	Yasunari Iwata	Makoto Saito	Reiko Hara	2:25.8
2015	Mikki Queen	Suguru Hamanaka	Yasuo Ikee	Mizuki Noda	2:25.0
2016	Sinhalite	Kenichi Ikezoe	Sei Ishizaka	U Carrot Farm	2:25.0
2017	Soul Stirring	Christophe Lemaire	Kazuo Fujisawa	Shadai Horse Race Co	2:24.1
2018	Almond Eye	Christophe Lemaire	Sakae Kunieda	Silk Racing	2:23.8
2019	Loves Only You	Mirco Demuro	Yoshito Yahagi	DMM Dream Club	2:22.8 (Note: Set the current race record)
2020	Daring Tact	Kohei Matsuyama	Haruki Sugiyama	Normandy Thoroughbred Racing	2:24.4
2021	Uberleben	Mirco Demuro	Takahisa Tezuka	K.Thoroughbred Club Ruffian	2:24.5
2022	Stars On Earth	Christophe Lemaire	Mizuki Takayanagi	Shadai Horse Race Co	2:23.9
2023	Liberty Island	Yuga Kawada	Mitsumasa Nakauchida	Sunday Racing	2:23.1
2024	Cervinia	Christophe Lemaire	Tetsuya Kimura	Sunday Racing	2:24.0
2025	Kamunyak	Andrasch Starke	Yasuo Tomomichi	Kaneko Makoto Holdings	2:25.7
2026	Juryoku Pierrot	Seina Imamura	Ryo Terashima	Kensuke Kondo	2:25.6

== Earlier winners ==
- 1938 - Asteri Mor
- 1939 - Hoshi Homare
- 1940 - Rounella
- 1941 - Tetsu Banzai
- 1942 - Rock States
- 1943 - Kurifuji
- 1944 - no race
- 1945 - no race
- 1946 - Mitsumasa
- 1947 - Tokitsukaze
- 1948 - Yashima Hime
- 1949 - King Night
- 1950 - Koma Minoru
- 1951 - Kiyo Fuji
- 1952 - Swee Sue
- 1953 - Jitsu Homare
- 1954 - Yamaichi
- 1955 - Hiroichi
- 1956 - Fair Manna
- 1957 - Miss Onward
- 1958 - Miss Marusa
- 1959 - Okan
- 1960 - Star Roch
- 1961 - Chitose Hope
- 1962 - O Hayabusa
- 1963 - I.T.O.
- 1964 - Kane Keyaki
- 1965 - Verona
- 1966 - Hiroyoshi
- 1967 - Yama Pit
- 1968 - Lupinus
- 1969 - Shadai Tarquin
- 1970 - Jupique

== See also ==
- Horse racing in Japan
- List of Japanese flat horse races
