= Shūka Shō =

Shūka Sho 秋華賞
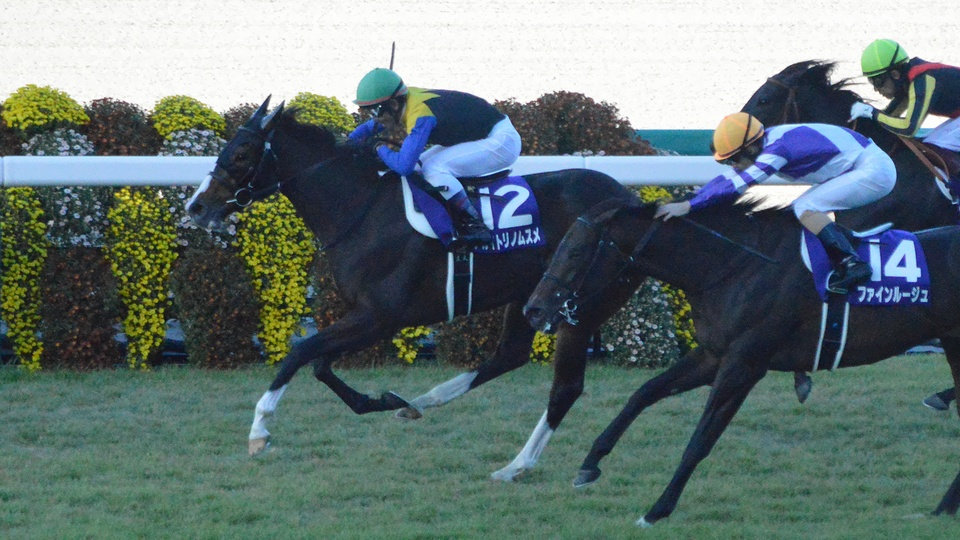
- 2021 Shūka Sho winner Akaitorino Musume
- Class: Grade 1
- Location: Kyoto Racecourse, Fushimi-ku, Kyoto, Kyoto Prefecture
- Inaugurated: October 20, 1996
- Race type: Thoroughbred Flat racing

Race information
- Distance: 2000 meters
- Surface: Turf
- Track: Right-handed
- Qualification: 3-y-o, Fillies
- Weight: 55 kg
- Purse: ¥ 238,100,000 (as of 2025): 1st: ¥ 110,000,000; 2nd: ¥ 44,000,000; 3rd: ¥ 28,000,000
- Bonuses: Fillies Triple Crown; Winner of Oka Sho, Yushun Himba, Shūka Sho ¥ 100,000,000

The Shūka Shō (秋華賞) is a Grade 1 flat horse race in Japan for three-year-old thoroughbred fillies run over a distance of 2,000 metres (approximately 1 1/4 miles) at the Kyoto Racecourse, Fushimi-ku, Kyoto, Kyoto Prefecture in October.

Established in 1996, the Shūka Shō replaced the Queen Elizabeth II Cup as the final leg of the Japanese Triple Tiara, preceded by the Oka Shō in early April and the Yushun Himba in May. It was as Domestic Grade 1 race until 2009, when it was granted International Grade 1 status.

Since 1996, there have been six racehorses who have won the Triple Tiara with the Shūka Shō as its third leg: Still in Love (2003), Apapane (2010), Gentildonna (2012), Almond Eye (2018), Daring Tact (2020) and Liberty Island (2023).

== Trial races ==
Trial races provide automatic berths to the winning horses or placed horses as specified.

Race	Grade	Racecourse	Distance	Condition
Shion Stakes	GII	Nakayama	2,000 meters	Top 3 horses
Rose Stakes	GII	Hanshin	1,800 meters	Top 3 horses

== Winners ==
Year	Winner	Jockey	Trainer	Owner	Time
1996	Fabulous la Fouine	Mikio Matsunaga	Hiroyuki Nagahama	Kazuko Yoshida	1:58.1
1997	Mejiro Dober	Yutaka Yoshida	Yokichi Okubo	Mejiro Shoji	2:00.1
1998	Phalaenopsis	Yutaka Take	Mitsumasa Hamada	North Hills Management Co Ltd	2:02.4
1999	Buzen Candle	Yasuhiko Yasuda	Hiroyoshi Matsuda	Ueda Bokujo	1:59.3
2000	Tico Tico Tac	Koshiro Take	Masahiro Matsuda	Bamboo Bokujo	1:59.9
2001	T. M. Ocean	Masaru Honda	Katsuichi Nishiura	Masatsugu Takezono	1:58.5
2002	Fine Motion	Yutaka Take	Yuji Ito	Tatsuo Fushikida	1:58.1
2003	Still in Love	Hideaki Miyuki	Shoichi Matsumoto	North Hills Management Co Ltd	1:59.1
2004	Sweep Tosho	Kenichi Ikezoe	Akio Tsurudome	Tosho Sangyo	1:58.4
2005	Air Messiah	Yutaka Take	Yuji Ito	Lucky Field Co., Ltd.	1:59.2
2006	Kawakami Princess	Masaru Honda	Katsuichi Nishiura	Mitsuishi Kawakami Bokujo	1:58.2
2007	Daiwa Scarlet	Katsumi Ando	Kunihide Matsuda	Keizo Oshiro	1:59.1
2008	Black Emblem	Yasunari Iwata	Shigeyuki Kojima	Kunio Tahara	1:58.4
2009	Red Desire	Hirofumi Shii	Mikio Matsunaga	Tokyo Horse Racing Co., Ltd.	1:58.2
2010	Apapane	Masayoshi Ebina	Sakae Kunieda	Kaneko Makoto Holdings	1:58.4
2011	Aventura	Yasunari Iwata	Katsuhiko Sumii	U Carrot Farm	1:58.2
2012	Gentildonna	Yasunari Iwata	Sei Ishizaka	Sunday Racing	2:00.4
2013	Meisho Mambo	Koshiro Take	Akihiro Iida	Yoshio Matsumoto	1:58.6
2014	Shonan Pandora	Suguru Hamanaka	Tomokazu Takano	Tetsuhide Kunimoto	1:57.0
2015	Mikki Queen	Suguru Hamanaka	Yasutoshi Ikee	Mizuki Noda	1:56.9
2016	Vivlos	Yuichi Fukunaga	Yasuo Tomomichi	Kazuhiro Sasaki	1:58.6
2017	Deirdre	Christophe Lemaire	Mitsuru Hashida	Toji Morita	2:00.2
2018	Almond Eye	Christophe Lemaire	Sakae Kunieda	Silk Racing	1:58.5
2019	Chrono Genesis	Yuichi Kitamura	Takashi Saito	Sunday Racing	1:59.9
2020	Daring Tact	Kohei Matsuyama	Haruki Sugiyama	Normandy Thoroughbred Racing	2:00.6
2021	Akaitorino Musume^{[a]}	Keita Tosaki	Sakae Kunieda	Kaneko Makoto Holdings	2:01.2
2022	Stunning Rose^{[a]}	Ryusei Sakai	Tomokazu Takano	Sunday Racing	1:58.6
2023	Liberty Island	Yuga Kawada	Mitsumasa Nakauchida	Sunday Racing	2:01.1
2024	Cervinia	Christophe Lemaire	Tetsuya Kimura	Sunday Racing	1:57.1
2025	Embroidery	Christophe Lemaire	Kazutomo Mori	Silk Racing	1:58.3
2026	Monroe Walk	Keita Tosaki	Hiroyuki Uemura	M's Racing	1:56.1^{[b]}

- ^{a} The 2021 and 2022 runnings were contested at Hanshin Racecourse, due to construction at Kyoto Racecourse.
- ^{b} Set the current race record

== See also ==
- Horse racing in Japan
- List of Japanese flat horse races
