= Japanese Classic Races =

Set of horse races in Japan

In horse racing in Japan, The Classics are a series of flat horse races. All of these races are organized by the Japan Racing Association. Each classic is run once each year and is restricted to active racehorses that are three years old excluding geldings. Only the first five races are considered as classic whilst Shuka Sho were inaugurated in 1996 to replace the Queen Elizabeth II Cup as the third leg of triple tiara.

Race	Date	Distance	Course	First Run	Qualification
Oka Sho (Japanese 1,000 Guineas)	April	1,600 meters	Hanshin	1939	Three-year-old fillies
Satsuki Sho (Japanese 2,000 Guineas)	April	2,000 meters	Nakayama	1939	Three-year-old colts/fillies
Yushun Himba (Japanese Oaks)	May/June	2,400 meters	Tokyo	1938	Three-year-old fillies
Tokyo Yushun (Japanese Derby)	May/June	2,400 meters	Tokyo	1932	Three-year-old colts/fillies
Kikuka Sho (Japanese St. Leger)	October	3,000 meters	Kyoto	1938	Three-year-old colts/fillies
Shūka Sho	October	2,000 meters	Kyoto	1996	Three-year-old fillies

== See also ==
- Triple Crown of Thoroughbred Racing (Japan)
- British Classic Races
- American Classic Races
- French Classic Races
