= Juryoku Pierrot =

Japanese Thoroughbred racehorse

Juryoku Pierrot ジュウリョクピエロ
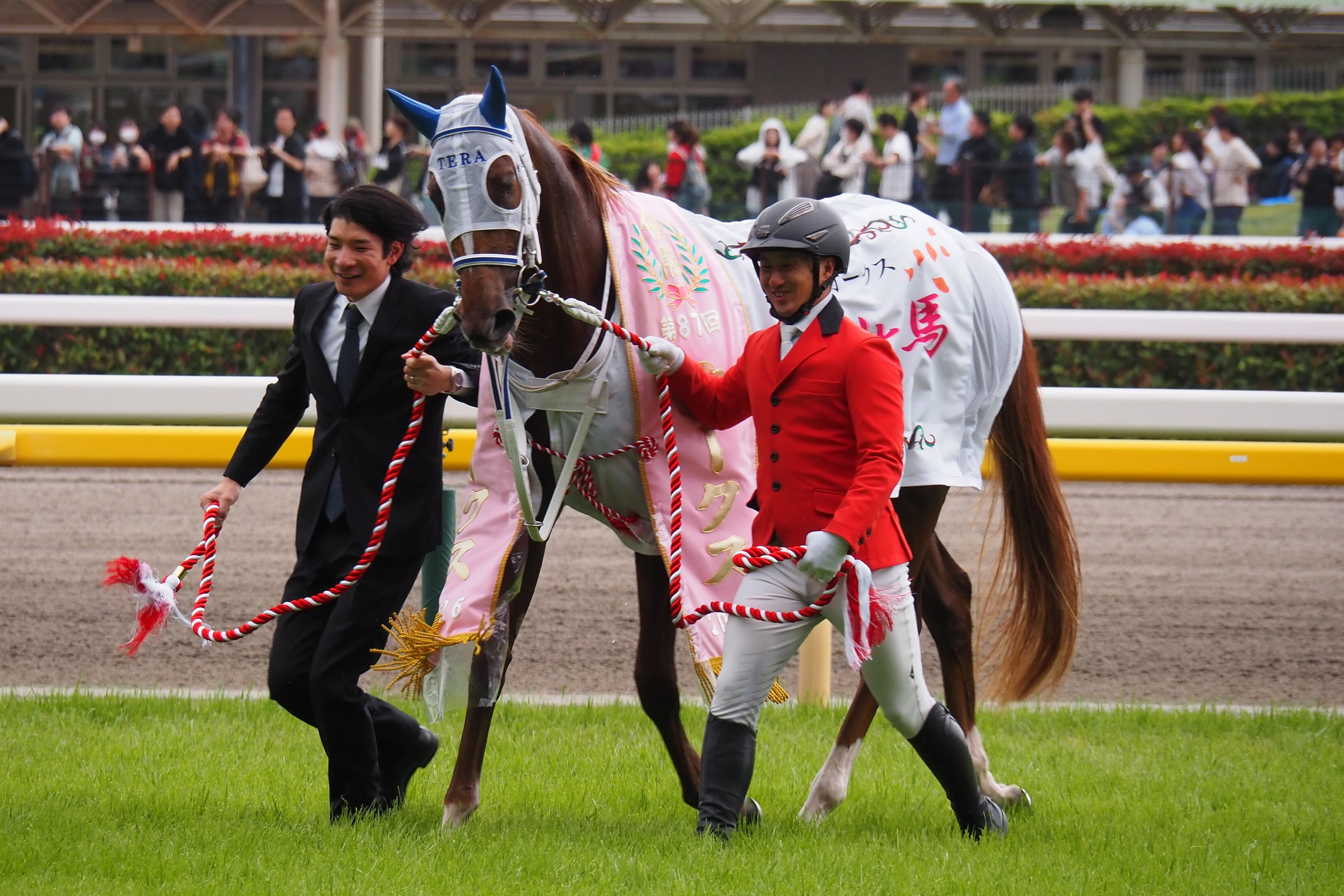
- Juryoku Pierrot at the 2026 Yushun Himba
- Breed: Thoroughbred
- Sire: Orfevre
- Grandsire: Stay Gold
- Dam: Happy Value
- Damsire: Zenno Rob Roy
- Sex: Filly
- Foaled: 26 February 2023 (age 3)
- Country: Japan
- Colour: Chestnut
- Breeder: Tobino Bokujo
- Owner: Kensuke Kondo
- Racing colours
- Trainer: Ryo Terashima
- Jockey: Seina Imamura
- Record: 7 : 4-0-0
- Earnings: ¥213,370,000

Major wins
- Japanese Classic Tiara Race wins: Yushun Himba (2026)

Juryoku Pierrot (Japanese: ジュウリョクピエロ, Hepburn: Jūryoku Piero; foaled 26 February 2023) is an active Japanese thoroughbred racehorse. She is known for winning the 2026 Yushun Himba.

Her name derives from Kotaro Isaka's novel of the same name.

== Racing career ==
=== 2025: two-year-old season ===
Juryoku Pierrot debuted on 28 September at a maiden race of 1,800m held on the dirt track of Hanshin Racecourse with Seina Imamura as her jockey. She would win that race with a three-and-a-half length lead.

The horse would then run her first group race, the JBC Nisai Yushun, but finished 7th. For the horse's final race of the season, Juryoku Pierrot was entered in to the Poinsettia Stakes on 20 December, but once again finished 7th.

=== 2026: three-year-old season ===
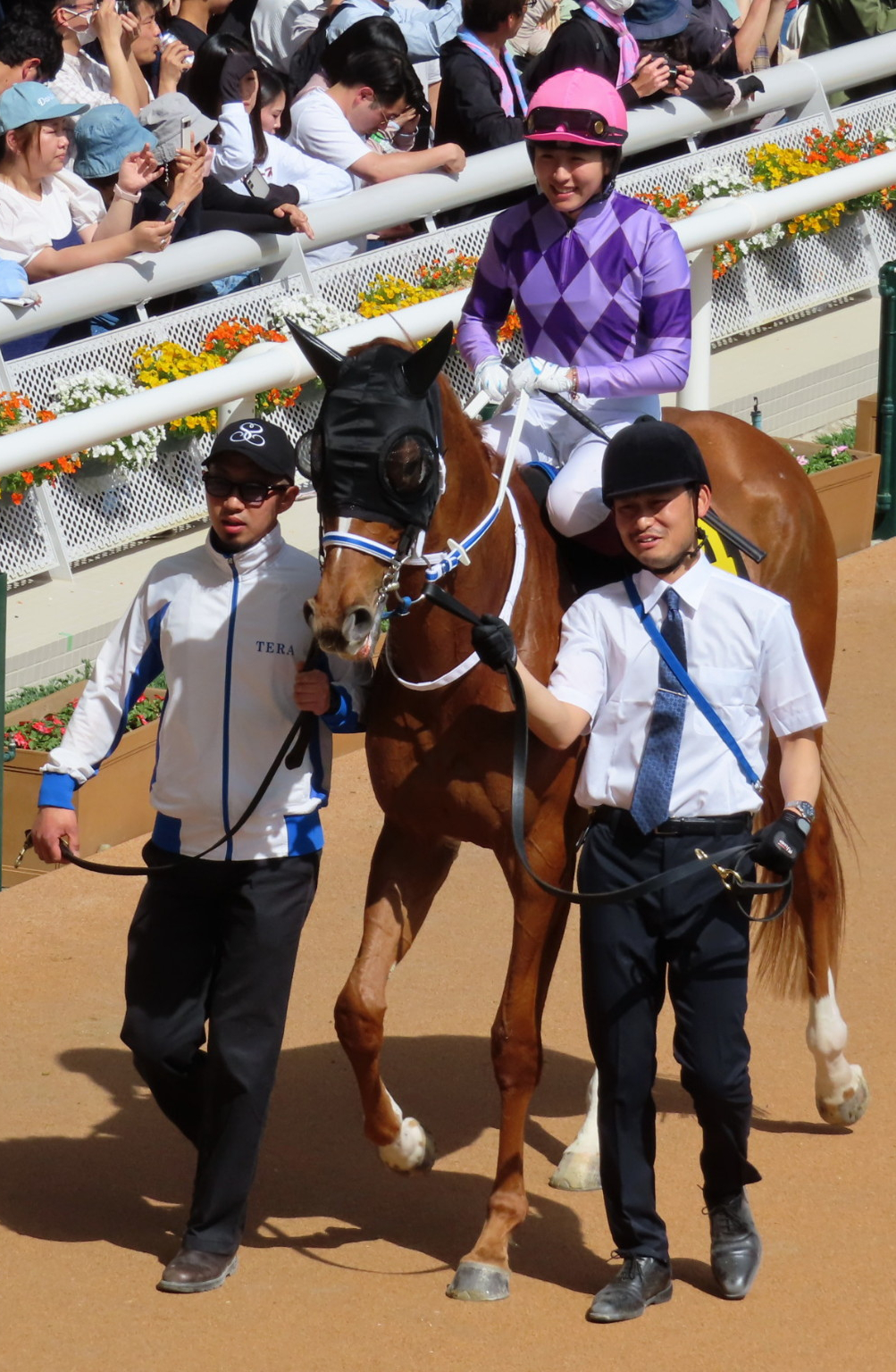
Juryoku Pierrot at the Wasurenagusa Sho

On 4 January, Juryoku Pierrot was entered in to an allowance race at Kyoto Racecourse. This was her first race on turf, as all her prior races were on dirt surfaces. Despite being the least favored to win the race, she made a decent start and was well placed among the pack, and while the horse herself was in a rush, Imamura reined her in to keep her acceleration more steady. While it took time for the horse to accelerate in the home stretch, the horse managed to claim her second victory, showing her aptitude on the turf.

Her next race, the Listed Wasurenagusa Sho, she was once again the underdog, having been the seventh favored to win the race in a field of 14 horses. Despite this, the horse was placed in the rear and took the lead from the outside on the final stretch, beating Pika Kiwi by two-and-a-half length lead and winning the race.

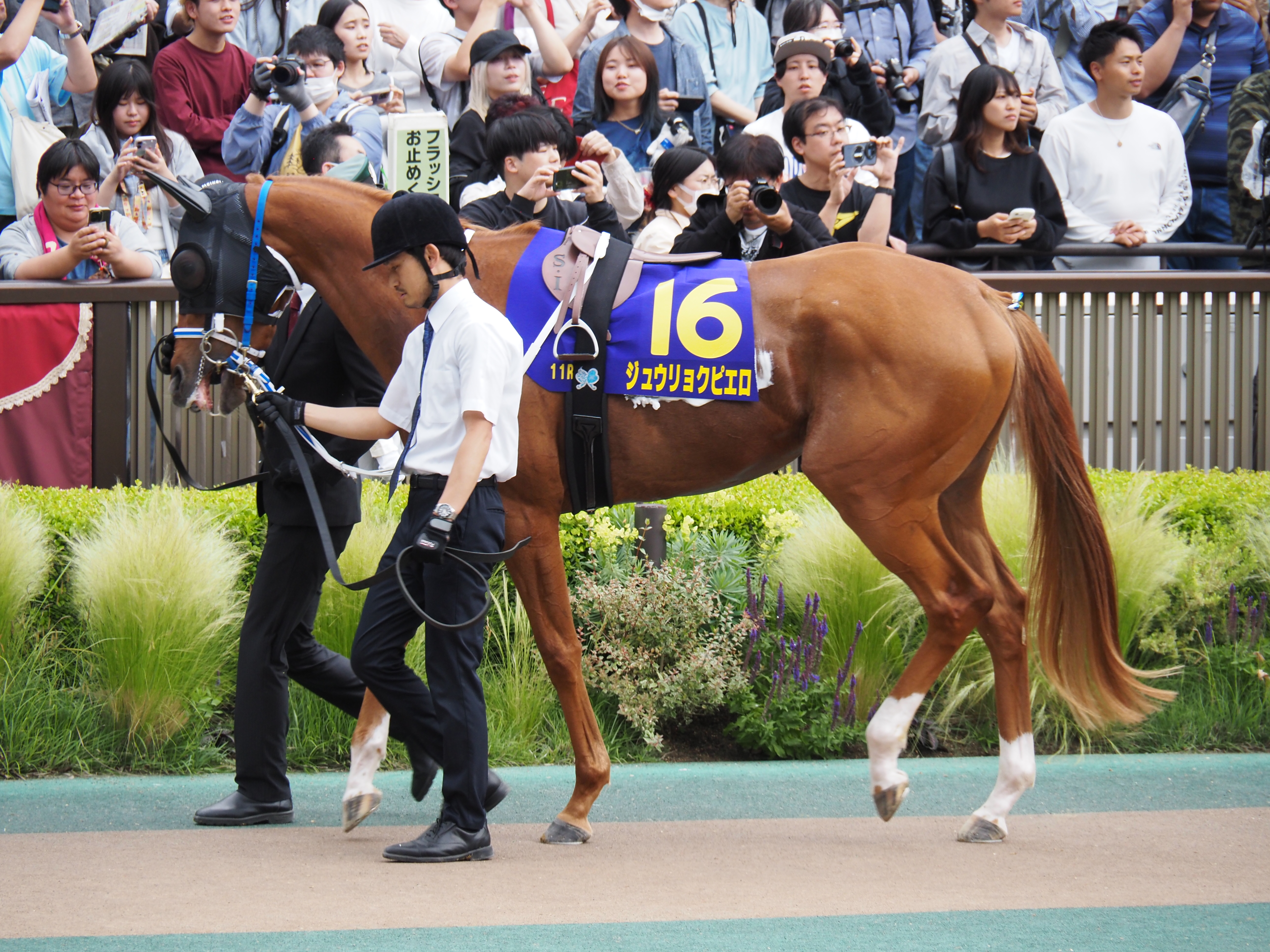
Juryoku Pierrot at the paddock of the Yushun Himba

Juryoku Pierrot was then entered in to the Yushun Himba (Japanese Oaks), where she was the fifth most favored to win. The horse was placed in the rear of the pack, and on the final stretch, the horse pushed through a gap in the field, taking over several horses including Dream Core and clinching her first group race victory. This victory was moreso a milestone for the jockey, Seina Imamura, who had not just won her first Classics race that she ever entered, but also became the first female JRA jockey to win a Group 1 race in the JRA. This race also marked the first Group 1 race victory for the horse's trainer, Ryo Terashima.

Although Juryoku Pierrot was initially entered into the Prix de l'Arc de Triomphe due to the race's deadline coming shortly after the Wasurenagusa Sho, trainer Ryo Terashima decided to not take up the entry for the race. Instead, Terashima opted to keep Juyroku Pierrot racing domestically, aiming for a run in the Shūka Shō in October prior to racing in the Queen Elizabeth II Cup in November. Terashima explained by saying, "We've decided to stay domestic this year. Her win in the Listed Wasurenagusa Sho was so impressive that we pushed from our side just to get her entered... but for this year, we felt it was better to proceed in order, first against her own generation in a G1 and then against older horses in a G1." On the day, the horse stayed mostly at the back from the gate until the final bend. Imamura guided her wide to gain position, but she failed to extend her strides and finished 11th. After the race, Imamura harshly criticized the horse's performance, saying it was not as impressive as she thought, but she was grateful she got the chance to ride it again.

== Racing Statistics ==
The following racing form is based on information available on netkeiba.com & JBIS-Search.

Date	Distance (Condition)	Race	Class	Course	Field	HN	Odds (Favored)	Finish	Time	Winning (Losing) Margin	Jockey	Winner (Runner-up)	Ref
2025 – two-year-old season
Sep 28	Dirt 1,800 m (Fast)	Two Year Old Debut		Hanshin	9	9	2.9 (1st)	1st	1:54.8	3 1/2 lengths	Seina Imamura	(Lord Stelatto)	
Nov 3	Dirt 1,800 m (Muddy)	JBC Nisai Yushun	JpnIII (Note: The race is classified as a local, Japanese Grade 3 event. Internationally as a Listed event.)	Mombetsu	11	7	5.4 (2nd)	7th	1:56.5	(5 1/4 lengths)	Seina Imamura	Tamamo Freesia	
Dec 20	Dirt 1,800 m (Fast)	Poinsettia Stakes	OP	Hanshin	10	7	30.1 (7th)	7th	1:55.0	(14 1/4 lengths)	Mirai Iwata	Rock Ptarmigan	
2026 – three-year-old season
Jan 4	Turf 2,000 m (Firm)	Three Year Old	1 Win	Kyoto	7	2	55.6 (7th)	1st	2:00.9	1 1/2 lengths	Seina Imamura	(Air be a Gale)	
Apr 12	Turf 2,000 m (Firm)	Wasurenagusa Sho	Listed	Hanshin	14	14	18.9 (7th)	1st	1:59.1	2 1/2 lengths	Seina Imamura	(Pika Kiwi)	
May 24	Turf 2,400 m (Firm)	Yushun Himba	G1	Tokyo	18	16	10.9 (5th)	1st	2:25.6	neck	Seina Imamura	(Dream Core)	
Nov 15	Turf 2,200 m (Soft)	Queen Elizabeth II Cup	G1	Kyoto	18	11	6.0 (2nd)	11th	2:15.3	(2 3/4 lengths)	Seina Imamura	Laughterlines	

== Pedigree ==
Pedigree of Juryoku Pierrot (JPN), chestnut filly, February 26, 2023
Sire Orfevre (JPN) (2008)	Stay Gold (JPN) (1994)	Sunday Silence (USA) (1986)	Halo (1969)
Sire Orfevre (JPN) (2008)	Stay Gold (JPN) (1994)	Sunday Silence (USA) (1986)	Wishing Well (1975)
Sire Orfevre (JPN) (2008)	Stay Gold (JPN) (1994)	Golden Sash (1988)	Dictus (FR) (1967)
Sire Orfevre (JPN) (2008)	Stay Gold (JPN) (1994)	Golden Sash (1988)	Dyna Sash (1979)
Sire Orfevre (JPN) (2008)	Oriental Art (JPN) (1997)	Mejiro McQueen (1987)	Mejiro Titan (1978)
Sire Orfevre (JPN) (2008)	Oriental Art (JPN) (1997)	Mejiro McQueen (1987)	Mejiro Aurola (1978)
Sire Orfevre (JPN) (2008)	Oriental Art (JPN) (1997)	Electro Art (1986)	Northern Taste (CAN) (1971)
Sire Orfevre (JPN) (2008)	Oriental Art (JPN) (1997)	Electro Art (1986)	Grandma Stevens (USA) (1977)
Dam Happy Value (JPN) (2011)	Zenno Rob Roy (JPN) (2000)	Sunday Silence (USA) (1986)	Halo (1969)
Dam Happy Value (JPN) (2011)	Zenno Rob Roy (JPN) (2000)	Sunday Silence (USA) (1986)	Wishing Well (1975)
Dam Happy Value (JPN) (2011)	Zenno Rob Roy (JPN) (2000)	Roamin Rachel (USA) (1990)	Mining (1984)
Dam Happy Value (JPN) (2011)	Zenno Rob Roy (JPN) (2000)	Roamin Rachel (USA) (1990)	One Smart Lady (1984)
Dam Happy Value (JPN) (2011)	Name Value (JPN) (1998)	Honour and Glory (USA) (1993)	Relaunch (1976)
Dam Happy Value (JPN) (2011)	Name Value (JPN) (1998)	Honour and Glory (USA) (1993)	Fair to All (1986)
Dam Happy Value (JPN) (2011)	Name Value (JPN) (1998)	Madison Country (USA) (1991)	Seattle Slew (1974)
Dam Happy Value (JPN) (2011)	Name Value (JPN) (1998)	Madison Country (USA) (1991)	Steal a Kiss (1983) (Family 19-b)

- Juryoku Pierrot is inbred S3 x M3 to Sunday Silence and S4 x S5 to Northern Taste
