= Japan Breeding Farms' Cup Ladies' Classic =

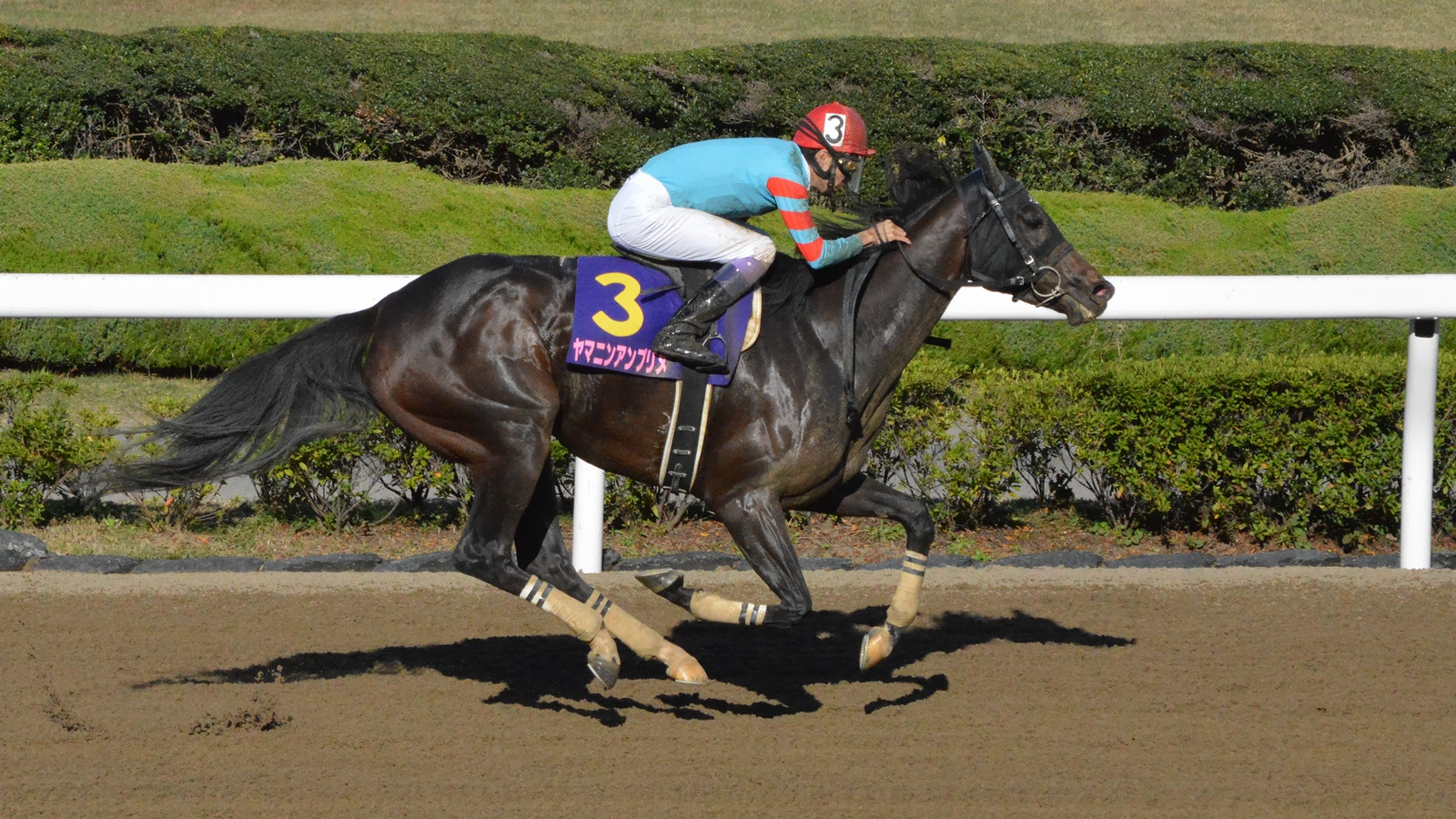
- 2019 Japan Breeding Farms' Cup Ladies' Classic
- Class: Domestic Grade I (JpnI)
- Location: Changes yearly
- Inaugurated: 2011
- Race type: Thoroughbred Flat racing

Race information
- Distance: Changes yearly
- Surface: Dirt
- Qualification: 3-y-o & Up, Fillies & Mares
- Weight: fillies 53kg mares 55 kg
- Purse: ¥102,000,000 (as of 2026); 1st: ¥ 60,000,000; 2nd: ¥ 19,200,000; 3rd: ¥ 10,800,000

Japan Breeding Farms' Cup Ladies' Classic (ジャパンブリーディングファームズカップレディスクラシック) is an annual race that is held in Japan each year usually on November 3, the national holiday Culture Day. This race was started as third JBC race in 2011. The first race was held at the Oi racetrack, and was won by Miracle Legend. In 2015, this was the only Grade 1 dirt race (including domestic Grade 1 race) for fillies and mares.

The Ladies' Prelude (domestic grade2, Jpn2 race), founded in 2011, is held as trial race.

== Winners ==
Year	Winner	Age	Jockey	Trainer	Owner	Organization	Time	Racecourse	Distance
2011	Miracle Legend	4	Yasunari Iwata	Hideaki Fujiwara	Teruya Yoshida	JRA	1:49.6	Oi	1,800 meters
2012	Miracle Legend	5	Yasunari Iwata	Hideaki Fujiwara	Teruya Yoshida	JRA	1:40.7	Kawasaki	1,600 meters
2013	Medeia	5	Suguru Hamanaka	Kazuhide Sasada	Shadai Race Horse	JRA	1:33.3	Kanazawa	1,500 meters
2014	Sambista	5	Yasunari Iwata	Katsuhiko Sumii	Hidaka Breeders Union	JRA	1:49.3	Kyoto	1,800 meters
2015	White Fugue	3	Takuya Ono	Noboru Takagi	Tsuru Nishimori	JRA	1:51.5	Oi	1,800 meters
2016	White Fugue	4	Masayoshi Ebina	Noboru Takagi	Tsuru Nishimori	JRA	1:41.3	Kawasaki	1,600 meters
2017	Lalabel	5	Daisuke Mashima	Katsunori Arayama	Teruya Yoshida	Oi	1:54.2	Oi	1,800 meters
2018	Ange Desir	4	Norihiro Yokoyama	Mitsugu Kon	Koji Yasuhara	JRA	1:50.4	Kyoto	1,800 meters
2019	Yamanin Imprime	5	Yutaka Take	Kodai Hasegawa	Hajime Doi	JRA	1:24.5	Urawa	1,400 meters
2020	Fashionista	6	Yuichi Kitamura	Takayuki Yasuda	Godolphin	JRA	1:51.1	Oi	1,800 meters
2021	Teorema	5	Yuga Kawada	Koichi Ishizaka	Yukio Mizukami	JRA	1:32.1	Kanazawa	1,500 meters
2022	Valle de la Luna	3	Mirai Iwata	Hideaki Fujiwara	La Mere Co., Ltd.	JRA	1:50.1	Morioka	1,800 meters
2023	Icon Tailor	5	Kohei Matsuyama	Hiroshi Kawachi	Kouichi Nakanishi	JRA	1:52.9	Oi	1,800 meters
2024	Ammothyella	3	Takeshi Yokoyama	Mikio Matsunaga	Hiroo Race Co. Ltd.	JRA	1:59.6	Saga	1,860 meters
2025	Ammothyella	4	Takeshi Yokoyama	Mikio Matsunaga	Hiroo Race Co. Ltd.	JRA	1:53.3	Funabashi	1,800 meters
2026	Anzu Ame	4	Yuga Kawada	Daisuke Takayanagi	Hidaka Breeders Union Co. Ltd.	JRA	1:32.7	Kanazawa	1,500 meters
