= Laughterlines =

Japanese Thoroughbred racehorse

Laughterlines ラフターラインズ
- Laughterlines at her maiden race (Tokyo Racecourse)
- Sire: Al Ain
- Grandsire: Deep Impact
- Dam: Bangor
- Damsire: King Kamehameha
- Sex: Filly
- Foaled: 6 February 2023 (age 3)
- Country: Japan
- Colour: Dark Bay
- Breeder: Northern Farm
- Owner: Sunday Racing
- Racing colours
- Trainer: Michihiro Ogasa
- Jockey: Yutaka Take; Damian Lane
- Record: 7 : 3-1-3
- Earnings: ¥270,014,000

Major wins
- Flora Stakes (2026); Queen Elizabeth II Cup (2026)

Laughterlines (Japanese: ラフターラインズ, Hepburn: Rafutārainzu; foaled 6 February 2023) is an active Japanese thoroughbred racehorse. She is known for winning the 2026 Queen Elizabeth II Cup.

== Background ==
Laughterlines was foaled out of Bangor, who won five races out of 20 starts. Her dam was sired by King Kamehameha, three-time leading broodmare sire in Japan, and foaled by Rosa Blanca, making her a full sister to Stunning Rose, who won the 2022 Shūka Shō and the 2024 Queen Elizabeth II Cup. Through her grand dam, she was a part of the infamous Rose Lineage which also included Rose Kingdom, that was descended from a 1993 imported mare named Rosa Nay. Laughterlines herself was sired by the 2017 Satsuki Sho and 2019 Osaka Hai winner, Al Ain.

She was owned by the Sunday Racing syndicate as "Bangor 2023" with 40 shares, valued ¥600,000 per share, totaling ¥24,000,000 in full price. Her name originated from a variety of rose, Laughterlines.

== Racing career ==
=== 2025: two-year-old season ===
In August, Laughterlines made her debut in a 1800 metres turf race at Niigata Racecourse alongside Keita Tosaki. She fought for the win but missed the chance by a neck to Swift Mimosa. Tosaki said she was a bit restless at the start, but her footwork was excellent throughout the race. Two months later, she had her second start on the same distance race but held at the anti-clockwise Tokyo Racecourse. In this race, she showed a powerful final surge, timed 33.8 seconds, and won her first race ever. Tosaki pointed out her great footwork once more but noted that she was a bit timid at the start, and he hoped the horse could turn that around better over time. She ended her season with a run at an allowance race, Koyamaki Sho in December with a new jockey, Miyabi Muto. As the first favourite, she positioned at the back and did her final closing kick but was unable to get the win, as she only crossed the line in third, one and a quarter lengths behind. As with Tosaki's comment, Muto also said that her pre-race mentality was an issue, but realized that the horse had a huge potential to grow.

=== 2026: three-year-old season ===
She resumed her career with a run in her first-ever graded stakes race, the Kisaragi Sho in February. On the race day, she had a terrible warm up and in high-strung state before the starts. Despite having some difficulties in the beginning, she calmed down, conserved energy, and pulled her final acceleration well enough to finish in third behind Zoroastro. Her jockey for this race, Yusuke Fujioka, admitted that the horse had great ability if she could sort out her mental fortitude before the race. To enter the Yushun Himba, Laughterlines proceeded to join the trial in April, the Flora Stakes, alongside another jockey, Damian Lane. As the gates opened, she ran in the middle of the pack in the early phase and settled down the pace early. As the runners entered the straight, she launched the fastest finishing kick in the homestretch, clocking at 32.8 seconds, and pulled away to win her first graded race by one and a quarter lengths ahead of the second-place finisher, Enne. Speaking about the victory, Lane said the horse's start was not particularly good, but it was good enough compared to her previous performances. Lane also noticed that this horse was capable of running in longer distances and was excited for the possibilities of her performances there. With her place in the Yushun Himba secured, she stuck with Lane as her jockey for the race. She ran excellently in that race as she marked Dream Core from the outside, dueled with her for the win before Juryoku Pierrot, jockeyed by Seina Imamura, caught up to both horses in the middle lane and stole the win at the line by a neck, as Laughterlines finished third behind Dream Core, also by a neck. Despite the lost, Lane praised the horse as she was in checked mentally before the race, got off a great start from the outermost gate, maintained the rhythm along the way, and finishing the race with a great speed left out in the legs.

However, after the race, it was discovered that she had suffered a fracture of the radial carpal bone in her left foreleg, and she was diagnosed with a condition requiring more than three months to heal. Although the injury was serious, it did not require surgery to deal with and her next target would be the Queen Elizabeth II Cup in November. Initially, she was deemed to run in the Mainichi Okan as her preparatory race, but unfortunately, she was diagnosed with heat in her front hoof and sent back to Northern Farm to recuperate. Fortunately, her right foot condition healed, and the team decided to skip the Mainichi Okan and sent her straight to the Queen Elizabeth II Cup, alongside another new jockey, Yutaka Take. On softer ground due to the heavy rain, seventh favourite Laughterlines broke from the gate 15 in a reserved manner at the rearward position. For most of the race, Sekitoba East set up a pretty slow pace, making it easier for the horse to conserve her energy along the way. At the final corner, Kamunyak, jockeyed by Yuga Kawada, burst forward in the middle and dueled with Aqua Vernal before pulling away for the seemingly assured win. The race took a sudden turn as Take pulled out an explosive surge from Laughterlines on the outside and overtook the rest of the field, including Kamunyak, just before the finish line to win her first G1 by a neck. Her trainer, Michihiro Ogasa thrilled with his first G1 win ever and said that the horse's win with Yutaka Take nonetheless, was a dream come true whilst the owner representative, Shunsuke Yoshida said that "Yutaka helped us win" as he felt grateful with his riding on the day. Meanwhile, he himself was nervous beforehand and noticed the horse's normal restless habit in the stall. Take also said that he was thankful that the horse fully got into rhythm and glad that despite the tougher track condition, Laughterlines performed well to win as he reminisced about her rose bloodlines, denoting to her great-great-granddam, Rose Colour, whom he rode back in the 1996 Queen Elizabeth II Cup.

== Racing form ==
The following racing form is based on information available on netkeiba.com & JBIS-Search.

Date	Distance (Condition)	Race	Class	Course	Field	HN	Odds (Favored)	Finish	Time	Winning (Losing) Margin	Jockey	Winner (Runner-up)	Ref
2025 – two-year-old season
Aug 17	1,800 m (Firm)	2yo Debut		Niigata	11	5	3.1 (2nd)	2nd	1:49.5	(0.0)	Keita Tosaki	Swift Mimosa	
Oct 5	1,800 m (Firm)	2yo Maiden		Tokyo	11	9	1.6 (1st)	1st	1:46.0	–0.4	Keita Tosaki	(Sekitei Lino)	
Dec 6	1,600 m (Firm)	Koyamaki Sho	1 Win	Chukyo	8	2	2.3 (1st)	3rd	1:37.0	(0.2)	Miyabi Muto	Cool Daytona	
2026 – three-year-old season
Feb 10	1,800 m (Firm)	Kisaragi Sho	G3	Kyoto	9	7	7.0 (4th)	3rd	1:48.0	(0.0)	Yusuke Fujioka	Zoroastro	
Apr 26	2,000 m (Firm)	Flora Stakes	G2	Tokyo	12	5	2.2 (1st)	1st	1:59.3	–0.2	Damian Lane	(Enne)	
May 24	2,400 m (Firm)	Yushun Himba	G1	Tokyo	18	18	3.2 (2nd)	3rd	2:25.6	(0.0)	Damian Lane	Juryoku Pierrot	
Nov 15	2,200 m (Soft)	Queen Elizabeth II Cup	G1	Kyoto	18	15	12.6 (7th)	1st	2:14.7	–0.1	Yutaka Take	(Kamunyak)	

== Pedigree ==
Pedigree of Laughterlines (JPN), dark bay filly, 2023
Sire Al Ain (JPN) 2014	Deep Impact (JPN); 2002	Sunday Silence	Halo
Sire Al Ain (JPN) 2014	Deep Impact (JPN); 2002	Sunday Silence	Wishing Well
Sire Al Ain (JPN) 2014	Deep Impact (JPN); 2002	Wind in Her Hair	Alzao
Sire Al Ain (JPN) 2014	Deep Impact (JPN); 2002	Wind in Her Hair	Burghclere
Sire Al Ain (JPN) 2014	Dubai Majesty (USA); 2005	Essence of Dubai	Pulpit
Sire Al Ain (JPN) 2014	Dubai Majesty (USA); 2005	Essence of Dubai	Epitome
Sire Al Ain (JPN) 2014	Dubai Majesty (USA); 2005	Great Majesty	Great Above
Sire Al Ain (JPN) 2014	Dubai Majesty (USA); 2005	Great Majesty	Mistic Majesty
Dam Bangor (JPN) 2012 FNo : 1-w	King Kamehameha (JPN); 2001	Kingmambo	Mr. Prospector
Dam Bangor (JPN) 2012 FNo : 1-w	King Kamehameha (JPN); 2001	Kingmambo	Miesque
Dam Bangor (JPN) 2012 FNo : 1-w	King Kamehameha (JPN); 2001	Manfath	Last Tycoon
Dam Bangor (JPN) 2012 FNo : 1-w	King Kamehameha (JPN); 2001	Manfath	Pilot Bird
Dam Bangor (JPN) 2012 FNo : 1-w	Rosa Blanca (JPN); 2005	Kurofune	French Deputy
Dam Bangor (JPN) 2012 FNo : 1-w	Rosa Blanca (JPN); 2005	Kurofune	Blue Avenue
Dam Bangor (JPN) 2012 FNo : 1-w	Rosa Blanca (JPN); 2005	Rosebud	Sunday Silence
Dam Bangor (JPN) 2012 FNo : 1-w	Rosa Blanca (JPN); 2005	Rosebud	Rose Colour

- Laughterlines is an inbred by 3 x 4 to Sunday Silence.
