= Ireland Trophy (horse race) =

Japanese thoroughbred race

Ireland Trophy アイルランドトロフィー
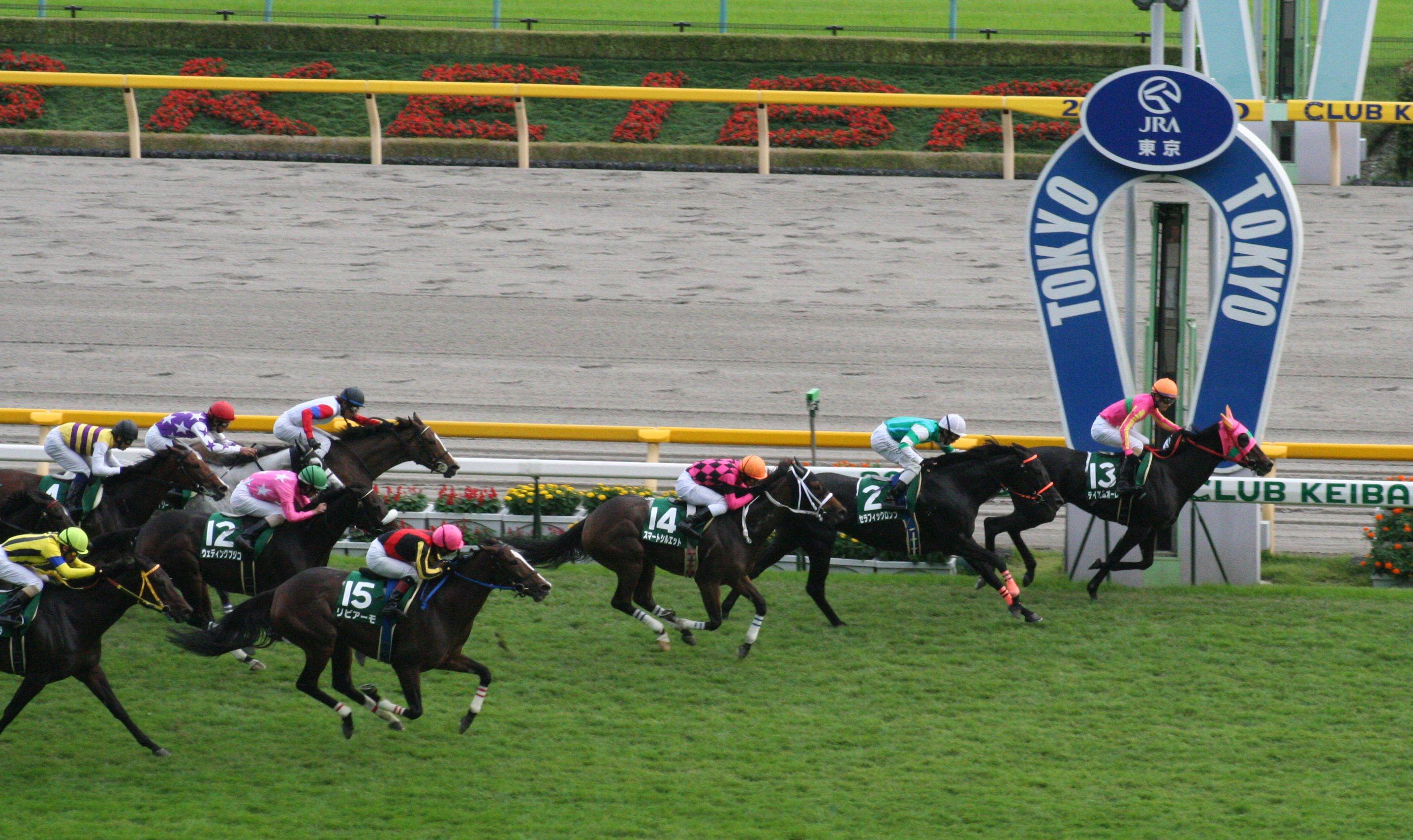
- Tokyo Racecourse
- Class: Grade 2
- Location: Tokyo Racecourse
- Inaugurated: 2025
- Race type: Thoroughbred Flat racing

Race information
- Distance: 1,800 meters
- Surface: Turf
- Track: Left-handed
- Qualification: 3-y-o + fillies and mares
- Weight: Special Weight
- Purse: ¥ 119,100,000 (as of 2026): 1st: ¥ 55,000,000; 2nd: ¥ 22,000,000; 3rd: ¥ 14,000,000

The Ireland Trophy (Japanese アイルランドトロフィー) is a Grade 2 horse race for Thoroughbred fillies and mares aged three and over run in Japan October over a distance of 1,800 meters at Tokyo Racecourse.

Established in 2025, it replaced the Fuchu Himba Stakes which was moved to June to replace the Mermaid Stakes, which was discontinued. The race will retain Fuchu Himba Stakes' Grade 2 status as well as acquiring rights to be a trial race for Queen Elizabeth II Cup, with the winner being given an entry slot for the race.

== Weight ==
53 kg for three-year-olds, 55 kg for four-year-olds and above.

Allowances:

- 2 kg for southern hemisphere bred three-year-olds

Penalties (excluding two-year-old race performance):

- If a graded stakes race has been won within a year:
  - 2 kg for a grade 1 win
  - 1 kg for a grade 2 win
- If a graded stakes race has been won for more than a year:
  - 1 kg for a grade 1 win

== Winners ==
Year	Winner	Age	Jockey	Trainer	Owner	Time
2025	Lavanda	4	Mirai Iwata	Naoya Nakamura	Satoshi Morinaga	1:45.7
2026	Kamunyak	4	Yuga Kawada	Yasuo Tomomichi	Kaneko Makoto Holdings	1:44.4

== See also ==
- Horse racing in Japan
- List of Japanese flat horse races
