= White Fugue =

Japanese Thoroughbred racehorse

White Fugue ホワイトフーガ
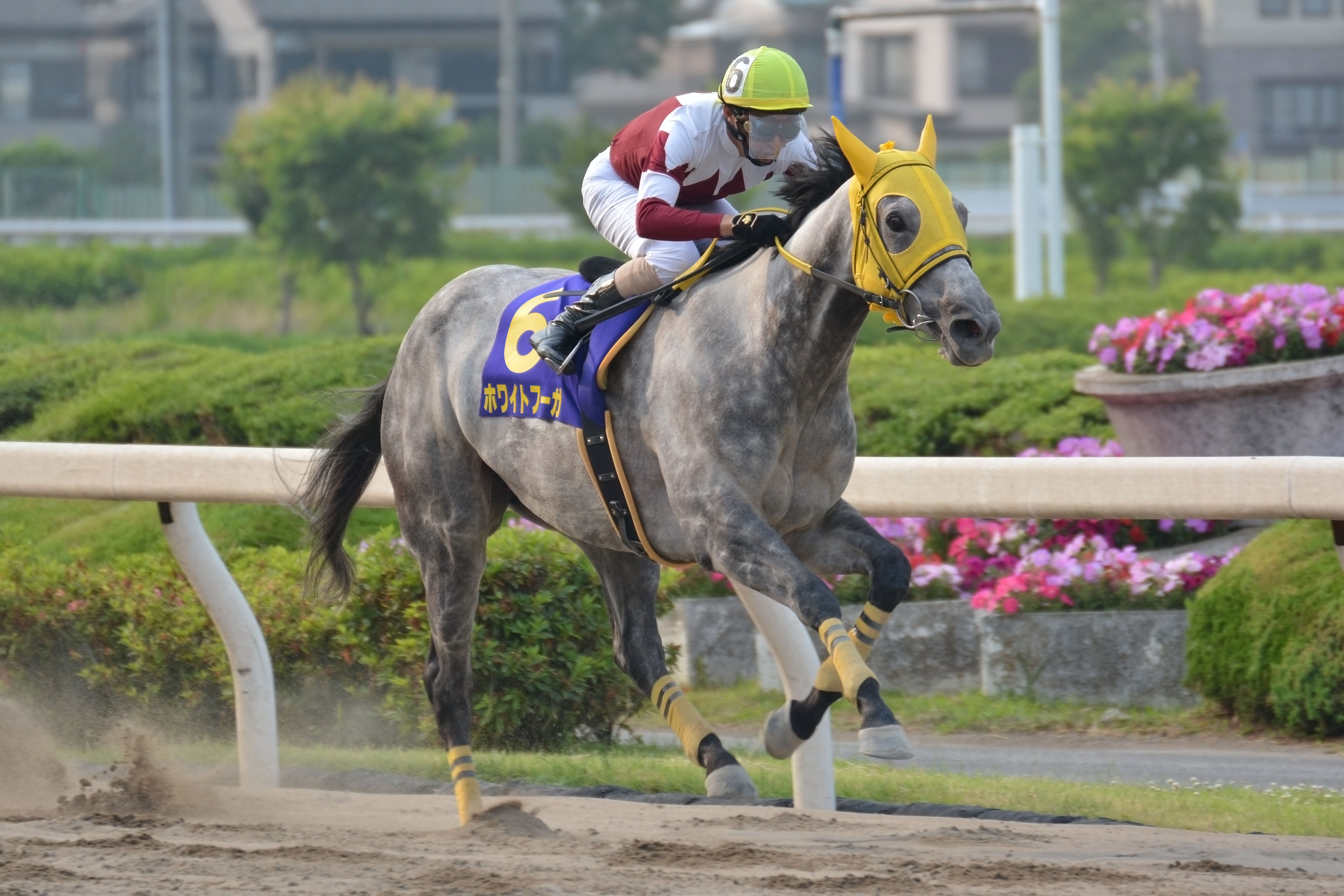
- White Fugue after winning the 2017 Sakitama Hai
- Sire: Kurofune
- Grandsire: French Deputy
- Dam: Marine Winner
- Damsire: Fuji Kiseki
- Sex: Mare
- Foaled: 28 March 2012 (age 14)
- Country: Japan
- Colour: Grey
- Breeder: Umeda Ranch
- Owner: Tsuru Nishimori
- Racing colours
- Trainer: Noboru Takagi
- Jockey: Masayoshi Ebina; Takuya Ono
- Record: 23: 10-3-3
- Earnings: ¥291,415,000

Major wins
- Kanto Oaks (2015); JBC Ladies' Classic (2015, 2016); TCK Jo-o Hai (2016); Sparking Lady Cup (2016); Marine Cup (2017); Sakitama Hai (2017)

Awards
- NAR Dirt Grade Race Special Award (2015, 2016)

White Fugue (Japanese: ホワイトフーガ, Hepburn: Howaito Fuuga; foaled March 28, 2012) is a retired Japanese Thoroughbred racehorse and active broodmare. She won multiple graded stakes races on the dirt track in Japan during the mid-2010s.

Her major victories include consecutive runnings of the JBC Ladies' Classic (JpnI) in 2015 and 2016. She also won races on the NAR circuit, including the Kanto Oaks (2015), the TCK Jo-o Hai (2016), the Sparking Lady Cup (2016), the Marine Cup (2017), and the Sakitama Hai (2017).

== Background ==
White Fugue is a grey mare bred in Japan by Umeda Ranch in Hokkaido. She was sired by Kurofune, an American-bred stallion who stood in Japan. Her dam, Marine Winner, was a daughter of Fuji Kiseki.

She was purchased by owner Tsuru Nishimori and sent into training with Noboru Takagi at the JRA's Miho Training Center. Throughout her career, she was primarily ridden by jockeys Masayoshi Ebina and Takuya Ono.

== Racing career ==
=== 2014–2015: Early career ===
White Fugue began her racing career in late 2014, winning her maiden race at Nakayama on the dirt. In early 2015, she ran on the turf track in the Nakayama Himba Stakes (GIII), finishing 16th, and returned to the dirt surface.

In June 2015, she won the Kanto Oaks (JpnII) at Kawasaki. After finishing third in the Breeders' Gold Cup and second to Sambista in the Ladies' Prelude, White Fugue defeated Sambista in the JBC Ladies' Classic in November to record her first JpnI victory.

=== 2016–2017: Older horse career ===
In 2016, White Fugue won the TCK Jo-o Hai (JpnIII) and the Sparking Lady Cup (JpnIII). She also finished fourth in the Sakitama Hai and second in the Ladies' Prelude. In November, she won the JBC Ladies' Classic (JpnI) at Kawasaki for the second time.

In 2017, she finished third in the TCK Jo-o Hai and ninth in the February Stakes. She won the Marine Cup (JpnIII) in April and the Sakitama Hai (JpnII) at Urawa in May. She later finished fourth in the Sparking Lady Cup and second in the Ladies' Prelude. In her final start in the JBC Ladies' Classic, she crossed the line first but was disqualified for interference, with Lalabel declared the official winner. Following this race, White Fugue was retired.

== Statistics ==
The following table details all 23 starts of White Fugue's racing career based on official netkeiba race charts.

Date	Distance (Condition)	Race	Class	Course	Odds (Favourite)	Field	Finish	Time	Winning (Losing) Margin	Winner (2nd Place)	Jockey	Ref
2014 – two-year-old season
Dec 6	Dirt 1800 m (Good to Soft)	2-Y-O Maiden	Maiden	Nakayama	3.7 (1st)	10	1st	1:55.6	–1.2	(Love Odin)	Takuya Ono	
2015 – three-year-old season
Jan 11	Dirt 1800 m (Good)	Kurochiku Sho	Allowance (1 win)	Nakayama	5.3 (2nd)	16	2nd	1:55.0	0.1	Invalides	Takuya Ono	
Jan 31	Dirt 1400 m (Heavy)	3-Y-O Allowance	Allowance (1 win)	Tokyo	2.3 (1st)	12	1st	1:24.8	–0.1	(Altair)	Takuya Ono	
Mar 21	Turf 1800 m (Good)	Flower Cup	GIII	Nakayama	18.6 (6th)	16	16th	1:51.3	1.9	Albiano	Takuya Ono	
Apr 5	Dirt 1800 m (Good to Soft)	Fukuryu Stakes	Open	Nakayama	22.7 (8th)	14	7th	1:53.9	0.9	Cross Krieger	Takuya Ono	
May 3	Dirt 1400 m (Good)	Tango Stakes	Open	Kyoto	22.3 (8th)	16	1st	1:23.3	–0.4	(Kafuji Take)	Masayoshi Ebina	
Jun 10	Dirt 2100 m (Good to Soft)	Kanto Oaks	JpnII	Kawasaki	3.9 (2nd)	13	1st	2:18.3	–2.3	(Pomme Figlia)	Takuya Ono	
Aug 13	Dirt 2000 m (Good)	Breeders' Gold Cup	JpnII	Monbetsu	3.2 (2nd)	14	3rd	2:09.2	1.1	Amour Briller	Takuya Ono	
Oct 1	Dirt 1800 m (Good to Soft)	Ladies' Prelude	JpnII	Ohi	9.8 (4th)	14	3rd	1:50.8	0.6	Sambista	Takuya Ono	
Nov 3	Dirt 1800 m (Heavy)	JBC Ladies' Classic	JpnI	Nagoya	9.3 (4th)	15	1st	1:51.5	–1.1	(Sambista)	Takuya Ono	
2016 – four-year-old season
Jan 13	Dirt 1800 m (Good)	TCK Jo-o Hai	JpnIII	Ohi	1.2 (1st)	11	1st	1:53.8	–0.2	(Power Spot)	Takuya Ono	
Feb 21	Dirt 1600 m (Soft)	February Stakes	GI	Tokyo	9.0 (5th)	16	10th	1:34.9	0.9	Moanin	Takuya Ono	
Jun 1	Dirt 1400 m (Good)	Sakitama Hai	JpnII	Urawa	6.9 (5th)	12	5th	1:26.8	0.9	Sorte	Takuya Ono	
Jul 6	Dirt 1600 m (Good)	Sparking Lady Cup	JpnIII	Kawasaki	2.0 (1st)	10	1st	1:40.5	–0.4	(Blue Chipper)	Masayoshi Ebina	
Sep 19	Dirt 1800 m (Soft)	Ladies' Prelude	JpnII	Ohi	1.3 (1st)	14	2nd	1:55.0	0.3	Tamano Brunette	Masayoshi Ebina	
Nov 3	Dirt 1600 m (Soft)	JBC Ladies' Classic	JpnI	Kawasaki	2.2 (1st)	13	1st	1:41.3	–0.2	(Let's Go Donki)	Masayoshi Ebina	
2017 – five-year-old season
Jan 25	Dirt 1800 m (Good)	TCK Jo-o Hai	JpnIII	Ohi	1.7 (1st)	12	3rd	1:54.2	0.1	One Millionth	Masayoshi Ebina	
Feb 19	Dirt 1600 m (Good)	February Stakes	GI	Tokyo	36.2 (10th)	16	9th	1:35.9	0.8	Gold Dream	Masayoshi Ebina	
Apr 12	Dirt 1600 m (Soft)	Marine Cup	JpnIII	Funabashi	2.9 (2nd)	11	1st	1:41.3	–0.6	(Lalabel)	Masayoshi Ebina	
May 31	Dirt 1400 m (Good)	Sakitama Hai	JpnII	Urawa	5.8 (3rd)	12	1st	1:25.7	–0.8	(Moanin)	Masayoshi Ebina	
Jul 6	Dirt 1600 m (Good to Soft)	Sparking Lady Cup	JpnIII	Kawasaki	1.4 (1st)	12	4th	1:42.9	1.3	Ange Desir	Masayoshi Ebina	
Oct 5	Dirt 1800 m (Good)	Ladies' Prelude	JpnII	Ohi	2.7 (2nd)	16	2nd	1:54.7	1.6	Queen Mambo	Masayoshi Ebina	
Nov 3	Dirt 1800 m (Soft)	JBC Ladies' Classic	JpnI	Ohi	1.8 (1st)	15	11th	1:56.3	2.1	Lalabel	Masayoshi Ebina	

== Notable progeny ==
- 2019 crop
  - Cha Pri (mare, by Rulership) – 5 wins / 22 starts, ¥30.52 million
- 2023 crop
  - Geist Segen (colt, by California Chrome) – 1 win / 7 starts, ¥2.39 million

== Pedigree ==
Pedigree of White Fugue (JPN)
Sire Kurofune 1998	French Deputy; 1992	Deputy Minister	Vice Regent
Sire Kurofune 1998	French Deputy; 1992	Deputy Minister	Mint Copy
Sire Kurofune 1998	French Deputy; 1992	Mitterand	Hold Your Peace
Sire Kurofune 1998	French Deputy; 1992	Mitterand	Set Free
Sire Kurofune 1998	Blue Avenue; 1990	Classic Go Go	Never Bend
Sire Kurofune 1998	Blue Avenue; 1990	Classic Go Go	Missy Baba
Sire Kurofune 1998	Blue Avenue; 1990	Eliza Blue	Icecapade
Sire Kurofune 1998	Blue Avenue; 1990	Eliza Blue	Eliza
Dam Marine Winner 1999	Fuji Kiseki; 1992	Sunday Silence	Halo
Dam Marine Winner 1999	Fuji Kiseki; 1992	Sunday Silence	Wishing Well
Dam Marine Winner 1999	Fuji Kiseki; 1992	Millracer	Le Fabuleux
Dam Marine Winner 1999	Fuji Kiseki; 1992	Millracer	Marston's Mill
Dam Marine Winner 1999	Marine Grace; 1993	Tony Bin	Kampala
Dam Marine Winner 1999	Marine Grace; 1993	Tony Bin	Severn Bridge
Dam Marine Winner 1999	Marine Grace; 1993	Marine Princess	Sea Hawk
Dam Marine Winner 1999	Marine Grace; 1993	Marine Princess	Marine Royale

== See also ==
- Thoroughbred racing in Japan
- Japan Breeding Farms' Cup Ladies' Classic
