= Sakitama Hai =

Japanese thoroughbred race

Sakitama Hai さきたま杯
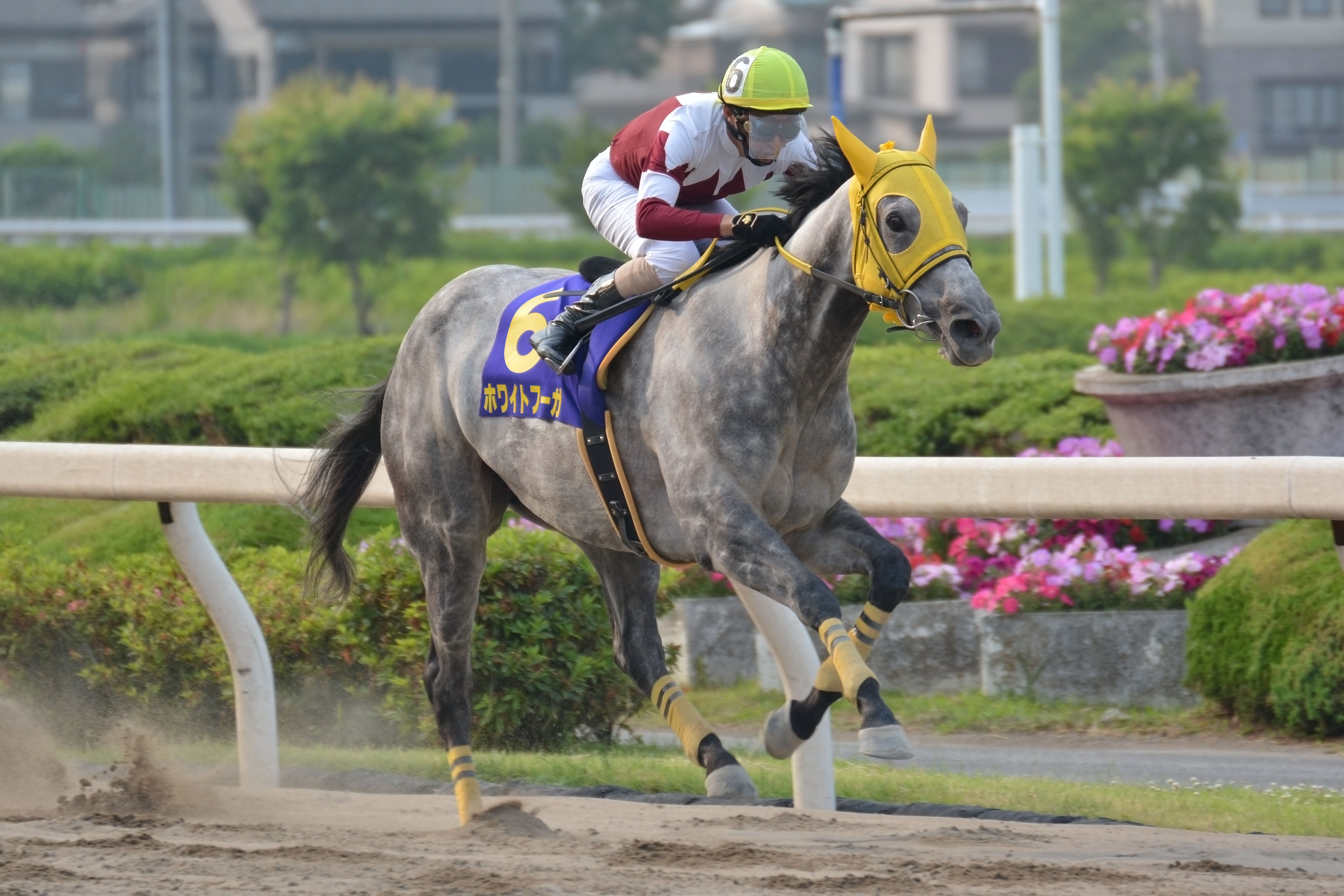
- White Fugue wins the 2017 Sakitama Hai
- Class: Domestic Grade I (JpnI)
- Location: Urawa Racecourse
- Inaugurated: 1997
- Race type: Thoroughbred - Flat racing

Race information
- Distance: 1,400 meters (0.87 mi)
- Surface: Dirt
- Track: Left-handed
- Qualification: Three-year-olds and above
- Weight: 3-y-o 53 kg, 4-y-o + 57 kg Allowance: 2 kg for fillies and mares 2 kg for SH-born 3-y-o 1 kg for SH-born 4-y-o
- Purse: ¥ 136,000,000 (as of 2025); 1st: ¥ 80,000,000; 2nd: ¥ 28,000,000; 3rd: ¥ 16,000,000

The Sakitama Hai (Japanese さきたま杯), is a Japanese Domestic Grade 1 horse race for thoroughbred horses aged three and over, run in June over a distance of 1,400 meters on dirt at Urawa Racecourse.

The race was first run in 1997 as a Domestic Grade 3 for thoroughbred horses aged three and over, until in 2005 when the age qualification was changed to horses aged four and over. In 2011, the race was promoted to Domestic Grade 2 status and held that until 2023.

In order to promote growth in the Japanese dirt sprinting scene, the race was promoted to Domestic Grade 1 status in 2024. The updated age qualification allows three-year-old horses again. The schedule of the race was also moved to mid-June.

== Winners ==
Year	Winner	Age	Jockey	Trainer	Owner	Organization	Time
1997	Fujino Makken O	6	Yutaka Yoshida	Yoshio Nakamura	Fumie Takahashi	JRA	1:25.8
1998	Theseus Frise	6	Hitoshi Matoba	Niizeki Tsutomu	Yoshiko Taguchi	JRA	1:25.8
1999	Setano King	8	Takayuki Ishizaki	Jun Shimada	Tadayoshi Ando	JRA	1:23.8
2000	Raise Suzuran	6	Teruo Eda	Sueo Masuzawa	Shuhei Suzuki	JRA	1:24.7
2001	Gaily Egret	6	Mikio Matsunaga	Yutaka Masumoto	Tokyo Thoroughbred Bureau Inc.	JRA	1:25.7
2002	Raise Suzuran	8	Teruo Eda	Sueo Masuzawa	Shuhei Suzuki	JRA	1:26.1
2003	Nobo True	7	Yutaka Take	Hideyuki Mori	LS.M Co. Ltd.	JRA	1:25.5
2004	Rocky Appeal	6	Tadanari Konno	Hiromi Yamazaki	Makoto Kaneko	Kawasaki	1:25.5
2005	Nihon Pillow Cert	7	Futoshi Komaki	Tetsuya Meno	Hyakutaro Kobayashi	JRA	1:25.5
2006	Agnes Jedi	4	Yutaka Take	Hideyuki Mori	Takao Watanabe	JRA	1:26.5
2007	Meisho Battler	7	Yutaka Take	Shigetada Takahashi	Yoshio Matsumoto	JRA	1:26.1
2008	Limitless Bid	9	Yasunari Iwata	Tadashi Kayō	Shadai Race Horse Co. Ltd.	JRA	1:25.9
2009	Smart Falcon	4	Yasunari Iwata	Ken Kozaki	Toru Okawa	JRA	1:26.4
2010	Smart Falcon	5	Yasunari Iwata	Ken Kozaki	Toru Okawa	JRA	1:26.2
2011	Nike Madrid	5	Keita Tosaki	Masayuki Kawashima	Seiji Ono	Funabashi	1:26.0
2012	Sei Crimson	6	Yasunari Iwata	Toshiyuki Hattori	Seiki Kaneda	JRA	1:25.8
2013	Testa Matta	7	Keita Tosaki	Akira Murayama	Kazumi Yoshida	JRA	1:27.4
2014	Northern River	6	Masayoshi Ebina	Hidekazu Asami	Masamichi Hayashi	JRA	1:26.7
2015	Northern River	7	Masayoshi Ebina	Hidekazu Asami	Masamichi Hayashi	JRA	1:26.7
2016	Sorte	6	Hiroto Yoshihara	Shintaro Terada	Frontier Co., Ltd.	Ohi	1:25.9
2017	White Fugue	5	Masayoshi Ebina	Noboru Takagi	Tsuru Nishimori	JRA	1:25.7
2018	Success Energy	4	Kohei Matsuyama	Yoshihito Kitade	Tetsu Takashima	JRA	1:26.2
2019	Win Mut	6	Ryuji Wada	Tadashi Kayō	Win Co. Ltd.	JRA	1:25.3
2020	Nobo Baccara	8	Taito Mori	Hideyuki Mori	LS.M Co. Ltd.	JRA	1:25.8
2021	Arctos	6	Hironobu Tanabe	Toru Kurita	Koichiro Yamaguchi	JRA	1:24.9
2022	Salsa Dione	8	Takayuki Yano	Chiaki Hori	Hirotaka Sugawara	Ohi	1:25.3
2023	Igniter	5	Tsubasa Sasagawa	Masashi Atarashima	Yoshiki Noda	Hyogo	1:25.3
2024	Lemon Pop	6	Ryusei Sakai	Hiroyasu Tanaka	Godolphin	JRA	1:26.7
2025	Shamal	7	Haruhiko Kawasu	Takeshi Matsushita	Toshiya Kanayama	JRA	1:23.2
2026	Lord Fons	6	Kazuo Yokoyama	Shogo Yasuda	Lord Horse Club	JRA	1:25.3

== See also ==
- Horse racing in Japan
- List of Japanese flat horse races
- National Association of Racing
