= Kamunyak =

Japanese thoroughbred racehorse

Kamunyak カムニャック
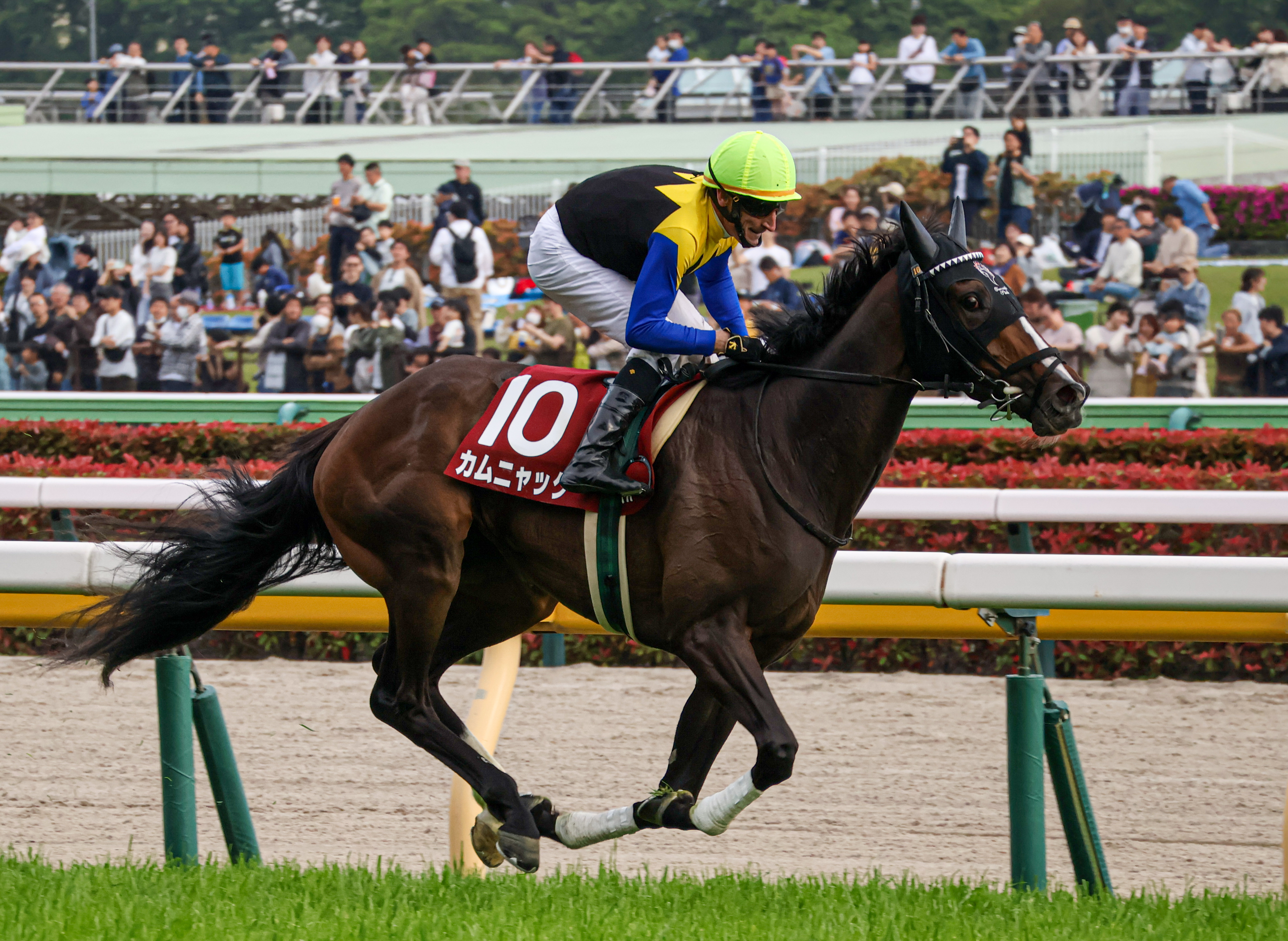
- Kamunyak at the 2025 Flora Stakes
- Breed: Thoroughbred
- Sire: Black Tide (JPN)
- Grandsire: Sunday Silence (USA)
- Dam: Dance Amiga (JPN)
- Damsire: Sakura Bakushin O (JPN)
- Sex: Filly
- Foaled: April 14, 2022 (age 4)
- Country: Japan
- Color: Bay
- Breeder: Shadai Farm
- Owner: Kaneko Makoto Holdings
- Racing colors
- Trainer: Yasuo Tomomichi
- Jockey: Andrasch Starke; Yuga Kawada
- Record: 11: 5-3-0
- Earnings: ¥498,243,000

Major wins
- Flora Stakes (2025); Rose Stakes (2025); Ireland Trophy (2026); Japanese Classic Tiara Race wins: Yushun Himba (2025)
- Last updated on November 15, 2026

Kamunyak (Japanese: カムニャック, Hepburn: Kamunyakku; foaled April 14, 2022) is a Japanese thoroughbred racehorse who won the 2025 Yushun Himba and Flora Stakes.

== Racing career ==
=== Background ===
Kamunyak's name is derived from the term "the blessed one" in Samburu.

She was bought by the Kaneko Makoto Holdings at the 2023 JRHA Select Sale for Yearlings for 77 million yen including taxes.

=== 2024: two-year-old season ===
Ridden by Yuga Kawada, Kamunyak debuted at a debut race for two-year-olds held at Chukyo Racecourse on August 11. She was the most favored to win that race, with the betting odds at 1.2, which she won, scoring her first victory. She was later sent to contest the Artemis Stakes held on October 26, where she was also the most favored to win. She was positioned third for most of the race, but fell behind on the final stretch and finished sixth.

=== 2025: three-year-old season ===
Kamunyak started the year off by entering the Elfin Stakes, where she was placed in the rear of the pack and tried to take the lead at the final stretch, only to finish fourth. After this race, she was entered in to the Flora Stakes, a trial race for the Yushun Himba (Japanese Oaks), held on April 27 at Tokyo Racecourse, with Andrasch Starke as her new jockey. During the race, she raced in the center of the pack before taking over the lead in the final 100 meters of the race, clinching her first graded race victory and gaining a slot for the Yushun Himba with a race record of 1 minute 58.6 seconds.

On May 25, Kamunyak was entered into the Yushun Himba with Starke once again riding her. She was the fourth most favored to win. During the race, she was placed among the pack, with the horse moving up after entering the final stretch, catching up with Arma Veloce who was in the lead, before beating her by a head. This was Kamunyak's first Grade I victory, and the first Japanese Grade I victory for Starke, the first time trainer Yasuo Tomomichi won the Yushun Himba, as well as the first time a Flora Stakes winner won the Yushun Himba since Saint Emilion in 2010.

For the second half of the season, Kamunyak returned on the Rose Stakes at Hanshin Racecourse. Trainer Tomomichi was convinced that Kamunyak would be able to deliver results on the day. After 1000 metres mark, Kamunyak was comfortable sitting between sixth and seventh position on the outside track. Despite encountering interference at the fourth corner when bumped by rivals, she surged powerfully through the middle of the track in the stretch, pulling clear to win by one and a-half lengths over the second place, Theresa. She closed out her season with an attempt of getting a second classic title at the Shuka Sho. The race did not went well for Kamunyak as she gassed out whilst entering the final straight and fell back to 16th-place in the end.

=== 2026: four-year-old season ===
In this new season, Kamunyak would start her campaign in the Hanshin Himba Stakes. She would be pitted against her classic rival, the double tiara Embroidery and the reigning Victoria Mile winner, Ascoli Piceno, for this one. Kamunyak did well for this outing as she positioned himself on the outside before sprinted surpassed the pack and only lost the race to Embroidery by a neck in the end. Her jockey, Yuga Kawada stated that she showed more patience than before in the race whilst trainer Tomomichi glad that she was able to adept to the early slow pace of the race and kept her mental strength for the whole session that day. Her next target race would be the Victoria Mile. In the final training session before the big day, Tomomichi said that the horse was calm, moving well, did not lose any weight, and was in good condition for the race. When the race began, Kamunyak broke smoothly and settled around seventh, tracking right behind Embroidery. She continued to stalk the race favorite in the stretch and, although unable to threaten the winner, crossed the wire one-and-a-quarter lengths clear of the rest of the field to finish second. After the race, Kawada said Kamunyak ran the race as she usually did and Tomomichi said she did her best and thought that possibly the defeat came from the lack of compatibility with the race distance. Based on this analysis, Tomomichi aimed her for the Queen Elizabeth II Cup in the autumn due to the horse's affinity for longer-distance races.

As preparation for that race, Kamunyak would enter the Ireland Trophy, a trial race for the Queen Elizabeth II Cup in October. Her final workout for the race was excellent, and Tomomichi confirmed that she was running leisurely and not pushing too hard on the ground. As the race started, she ran in the middle pack before making a move at the final corner to the front. She accelerated and dueled with Jocelyn, who made the move earlier, and overtook her just before the finish line to take first place in the race. This was her fourth graded stakes win and earned her the priority spot for the Queen Elizabeth II Cup. In the post-race, Kawada said that he was relieved that this horse was able to win the race. A few days before the race, the horse was calm and collected in the final workout and the trainer wanted to keep her in that mood until the Kawada back on her saddle. On the day, she positioned herself well enough on the front group before making a bid for the win in the final homestretch. It was safe and sound until the final few metres before the line when Laughterlines, jockeyed by Yutaka Take, surged forward from the outside and overtook her as she crossed the line in second place a neck behind. In the post-race interview, Kawada said that the horse was fine throughout the day and ran excellently. It was just that the final result was a bit disappointing. This was also noted by a veteran former jockey, Katsumi Ando, who thought her run was perfect except for the finishing position.

== Racing statistics ==
The following data is based on information available on netkeiba.com and JBIS-Search.

Date	Track	Race	Grade	Distance (Condition)	Entry	HN	Odds (Favored)	Finish	Time	Margins	Jockey	Winner (Runner-up)
2024 – two-year-old season
Aug 11	Chukyo	2YO Debut		2,000 m (Firm)	9	1	1.2 (1)	1st	2:04.2	0.6	Yuga Kawada	(Rouge Sequel)
Oct 26	Tokyo	Artemis Stakes	GIII	1,600 m (Firm)	11	10	3.1 (1)	6th	1:34.8	0.2	Yuga Kawada	Brown Ratchet
2025 – three-year-old season
Feb 10	Kyoto	Elfin Stakes	L	1,600 m (Firm)	9	2	3.8 (3)	4th	1:36.1	0.8	Yuga Kawada	Voulezvous
Apr 27	Tokyo	Flora Stakes	GII	2,000 m (Firm)	18	10	14.7 (7)	1st	R1:58.6	-0.2	Andrasch Starke	(Valkyrie Birth)
May 25	Tokyo	Yushun Himba	GI	2,400 m (Firm)	18	15	14.3 (4)	1st	2:25.7	0.0	Andrasch Starke	(Arma Veloce)
Sep 14	Hanshin	Rose Stakes	GII	1,800 m (Firm)	18	11	2.9 (1)	1st	1:43.5	-0.2	Yuga Kawada	(Theresa)
Oct 19	Kyoto	Shūka Sho	GI	2,000 m (Firm)	18	17	2.1 (1)	16th	2:00.2	1.9	Yuga Kawada	Embroidery
2026 – four-year-old season
Apr 11	Hanshin	Hanshin Himba Stakes	GII	1,600 m (Firm)	10	5	7.8 (4)	2nd	1:31.6	0.0	Yuga Kawada	Embroidery
May 17	Tokyo	Victoria Mile	GI	1,600 m (Firm)	18	8	5.3 (2)	2nd	1:31.1	0.2	Yuga Kawada	Embroidery
Oct 11	Tokyo	Ireland Trophy	GII	1,800 m (Firm)	16	16	3.2 (1)	1st	1:44.4	-0.1	Yuga Kawada	(Jocelyn)
Nov 15	Kyoto	Queen Elizabeth II Cup	GI	2,200 m (Soft)	18	7	4.2 (1)	2nd	2:14.8	0.1	Yuga Kawada	Laughterlines

Legend:

- R indicated that it was a record finish time.

== Pedigree ==
Pedigree of Kamunyak
Sire Black Tide 2001 dk. b.	Sunday Silence; 1986 br.	Halo	Hail to Reason
Sire Black Tide 2001 dk. b.	Sunday Silence; 1986 br.	Halo	Cosmah
Sire Black Tide 2001 dk. b.	Sunday Silence; 1986 br.	Wishing Well	Understanding
Sire Black Tide 2001 dk. b.	Sunday Silence; 1986 br.	Wishing Well	Mountain Flower
Sire Black Tide 2001 dk. b.	Wind in Her Hair; 1991 b.	Alzao	Lyphard
Sire Black Tide 2001 dk. b.	Wind in Her Hair; 1991 b.	Alzao	Lady Rebecca
Sire Black Tide 2001 dk. b.	Wind in Her Hair; 1991 b.	Burghclere	Busted
Sire Black Tide 2001 dk. b.	Wind in Her Hair; 1991 b.	Burghclere	Highclere
Dam Dance Amiga 2011 ch.	Sakura Bakushin O 1989 b.	Sakura Yutaka O	Tesco Boy
Dam Dance Amiga 2011 ch.	Sakura Bakushin O 1989 b.	Sakura Yutaka O	Angelica
Dam Dance Amiga 2011 ch.	Sakura Bakushin O 1989 b.	Sakura Hagoromo	Northern Taste
Dam Dance Amiga 2011 ch.	Sakura Bakushin O 1989 b.	Sakura Hagoromo	Clear Amber
Dam Dance Amiga 2011 ch.	Dance All Night; 2003 b.	El Condor Pasa	Kingmambo
Dam Dance Amiga 2011 ch.	Dance All Night; 2003 b.	El Condor Pasa	Saddlers Gal
Dam Dance Amiga 2011 ch.	Dance All Night; 2003 b.	Dance Partner	Sunday Silence
Dam Dance Amiga 2011 ch.	Dance All Night; 2003 b.	Dance Partner	Dancing Key

- Kamunyak shares similar pedigrees as Kitasan Black, as both horses are sired by Black Tide and Sakura Bakushin O is their mutual damsire.
- Kamunyak's half-brother, Keep Calm, won the 2025 Shirasagi Stakes.
- Kamunyak's great granddam, Dance Partner, won the 1995 Yushun Himba and the 1996 Queen Elizabeth II Cup. Dance Partner's full brother is Dance in the Dark (1996 Kikuka-shō winner) and their full sister is Dance in the Mood (2004 Oka Sho and 2006 Victoria Mile winner), who are also half-brothers to Air Dublin (1994 Aoba Sho winner).
- Kamunyak's granddam, Dance All Night, has a half-brother named Federalist, who won the Nakayama Kimpai and Nakayama Kinen in 2012.
- Kamunyak's uncle is Yokagura, who won the 2018 Kokura Summer Jump.
