= Oka Sho (Urawa) =

Japanese thoroughbred race

- Location: Urawa Racecourse
- Inaugurated: April 10th, 1955
- Race type: Thoroughbred - Flat racing

Race information
- Distance: 1,600 meters
- Surface: Dirt
- Qualification: Three-year-old mares
- Weight: 54kg
- Purse: 1st: ¥20,000,000

The Oka Sho (in Japanese: 桜花賞) is a Japanese horserace for three-year-old mares held by the Saitama Urawa Horse Racing Association.

== Race details ==
The race is run on a 1,600-meter dirt track at Urawa Racecourse.

It has been held at many racetracks including Kawasaki, Ohi, Funabashi and Urawa.

The race was originally held in April but is now run at the end of March.

== Winners since 2015 ==
Winners since 2015 include:

Year	Winner	Jockey	Trainer	Time
2015	Lalabel	Daisuke Majima	Katsunori Aryama	1:42.3
2016	Modern Woman	Daisuke Majima	Katsunori Arayama	1:41.9
2017	Star Impulse	Satoshi Ishizaki	Satoshi Kokubo	1:42.8
2018	Promised Leaf	Norifumi Mikamoto	Terunobu Fujita	1:41.6
2019	Tosen Garnet	Seiji Saki	Satoshi Kokubo	1:40.4
2020	Aqua Libre	Toshiya Yamamoto	Kenji Sato	1:41.2
2021	Cerasus Via	Taito Mori	Satoshi Kokubo	1:42.1
2022	Speedy Kick	Norifumi Mikamoto	Tomoyuki Fujihara	1:41.8
2023	Made It Mum	Kota Motohashi	Katsuo Ishii	1:35.0
2024	Princess Allie	Taito Mori	Yoshikazu Kanuma	1:36.9
2025	Proud Fleur	Akita Harita	Masakazu Kawashima	1:33.5
2026	Ange Luna	Ryo Nobata	Satoshi Kokubo	1:34.7

== Past winners ==
Past winners include:

- 1955: East O
- 1956: Minami Park
- 1957: Kikuhama
- 1958: Daini Kotobuki
- 1959: Glory Wine
- 1960: Ichi Tomishiyo
- 1961: Arizona Hope
- 1962: Daisan Kiyosachi
- 1963: Rashiki Mami
- 1964: Isogo
- 1965: Kiyokuto
- 1966: Orico
- 1967: Lorelei
- 1968: Never Mana
- 1969: Tokihinoe
- 1970: Bravely
- 1971: Tanino Katsuhime
- 1972: Hindo Line
- 1973: World Bit
- 1974: Miss Phalaris
- 1975: People Queen
- 1976: Nitto Zakura
- 1977: Ebi Fubuki
- 1978: Ace Line
- 1979: Shadow
- 1980: Beku Louise
- 1981: Konan Ruby
- 1982: Seidai Kagetsu
- 1983: Mill Top
- 1984: Grace Taizan
- 1985: Hanabusa Queen
- 1986: Mineno Okan
- 1987: Takane Pinion
- 1988: Lady Shine
- 1989: Rosita
- 1990: Kotobuki Tomi O
- 1991: Speed Dior
- 1992: Ace Popo
- 1993: White Arena
- 1994: Reward Runse
- 1995: Nike Grace
- 1996: Mikino Dancer
- 1997: Silver Act
- 1998: Diamond Core
- 1999: Wonder Luna
- 2000: Amy
- 2001: Nami
- 2002: Loverly Frigg
- 2003: Memory Hime
- 2004: Kanemasa Venus
- 2005: Mirai
- 2006: Charm Asleep
- 2007: Maruno Manhattan
- 2008: Filia Regius
- 2009: Nefer Memory
- 2010: Shorida Banzai
- 2011: Race not held due to the Great East Japan Earthquake
- 2012: Kotekitai
- 2013: Ichiryu
- 2014: Shark Fang

== See also ==
- Horse racing in Japan
- List of Japanese flat horse races
