= Arma Veloce =

Japanese thoroughbred racehorse

Arma Veloce アルマヴェローチェ
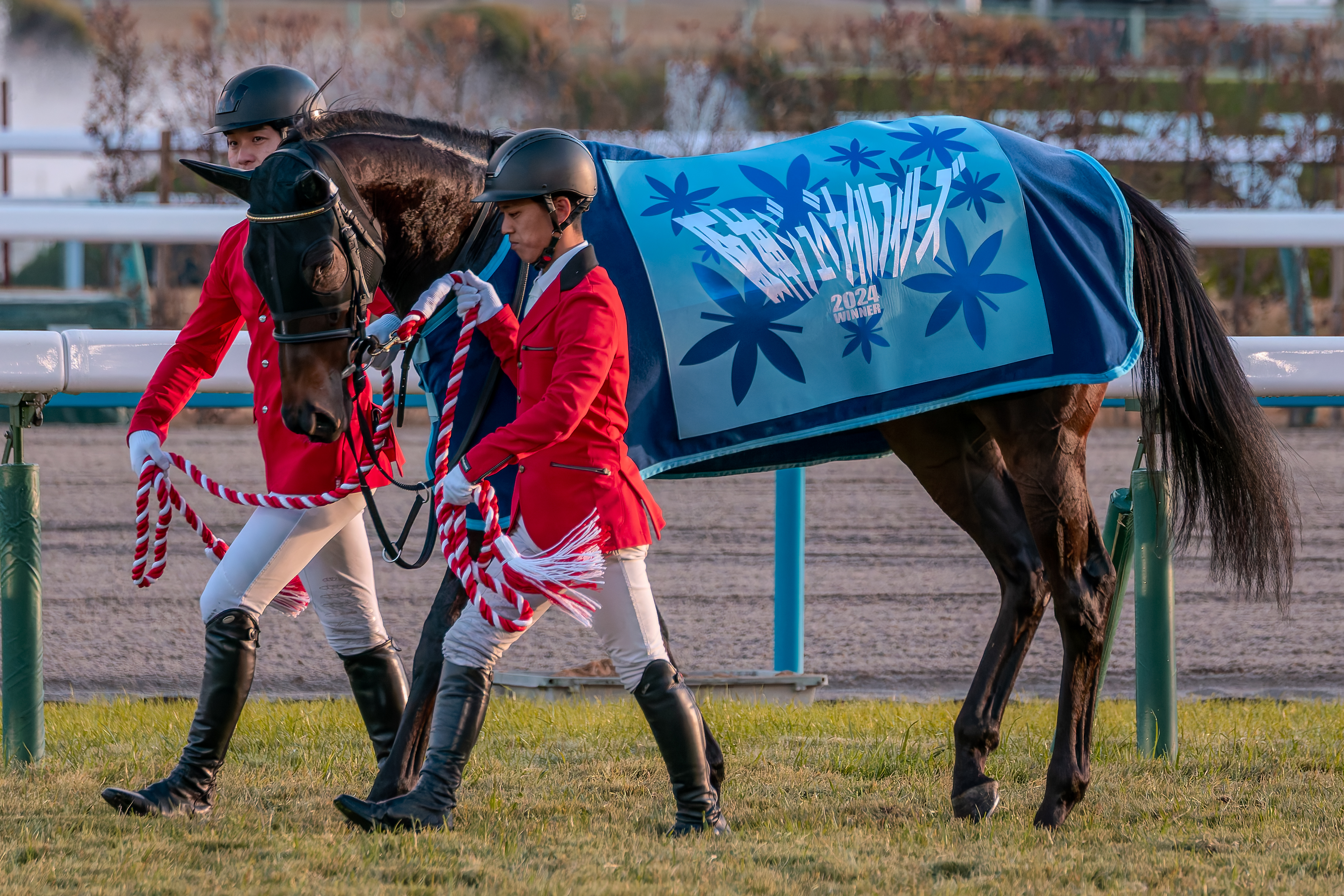
- Arma Veloce after winning the Hanshin Juvenile Fillies
- Breed: Thoroughbred
- Sire: Harbinger
- Grandsire: Dansili
- Dam: Rakuami
- Damsire: Daiwa Major
- Sex: Filly
- Foaled: February 15, 2022 (age 4)
- Country: Japan
- Colour: Dark bay
- Breeder: Northern Farm
- Owner: Teruo Ohno (TO Racing)
- Racing colours
- Trainer: Hiroyuki Uemura
- Jockey: Mirai Iwata
- Record: 5: 2–3–0
- Earnings: ¥218,672,000

Major wins
- Hanshin Juvenile Fillies (2024)

Awards
- JRA Award for Best Two-Year-Old Filly (2024)
- Last updated on 10 January 2026

Arma Veloce (アルマヴェローチェ; foaled February 15, 2022) is a Japanese thoroughbred racehorse who famously won the Hanshin Juvenile Fillies in 2024. She also managed to be the runner-up for both Oka Sho and Yushun Himba in her classic season.

== Background ==
Arma Veloce was foaled out of Rakuami, who won three races out of 24 starts. She was sired by Daiwa Major who was a prominent racehorse in the mid-2000s with a Satsuki Sho and back to back Mile Championship wins. Arma Veloce's sire is Harbinger, the 2010 King George VI and Queen Elizabeth Stakes winner.

Her name came from the Italian word Arma which meant for weapon and the crown name Veloce.

== Racing career ==
=== Two-year-old season (2024) ===
She made her career debut in a debut race in Sapporo Racecourse. She was jockeyed by Takeshi Yokoyama, led the race, maintaining the lead over No Standard, who was in second place. Then, she slowed her pace down for the final 1000m and held off the rest of the pack in the straight, winning her debut race. Later, she raced in her first graded race, the Sapporo Nisai Stakes. At start, she ran pretty well in the middle pack. She made a good progress after the third corner but lost out to Magic Sands at the line, finishing in second place a nose behind.

In December, she chose the Hanshin Juvenile Fillies as her first G1 race. This is her first race with new jockey, Mirai Iwata. In the race, Ryusei Sakai who was jockeying Mistress took the lead early as the front runner. Arma Veloce alongside Shonan Xanadu and Vip Daisy ran behind her and maintaining their position well. On the final stints, Vip Daisy started sprinting to the line but Arma Veloce matched her up, moved to the outside and overtook her for the win a length ahead of others. This was also Mirai Iwata's first ever G1 race win. In the end of season, Arma Veloce won the JRA Award for Best Two-Year-Old Filly with 255 votes out of 256 total.

=== Three-year-old season (2025) ===
It was announced that she would heading straight into the Oka Sho at Hanshin Racecourse in March. On the soft and rainy track, She triggered a good start and made a move to the outside for a straight duel with Embroidery. She overtook Embroidery on the final straight before Embroidery came back and zig-zagged Arma Veloce before sprinting passed her for the win.

In her next race which would be the Yushun Himba, Arma Veloce again scored a good start from the inside gate and took the lead into the final phase but Kamunyak had another idea as she used a powerful final kick from behind to steal the win from Arma Veloce in the end. Four days after the race, Arma Veloce was diagnosed with a minor avulsion fracture in the first phalanx of her right foreleg on May 29. She was scheduled for a surgery and rested solely for the Shuka Sho. The plan was scrapped as of September 19 when she had developed a flexor tendonitis on her left fore in which a long layoff from the racetrack was required.

== Racing form ==
Arma Veloce had won two races out of five starts. The data available is based on JBIS and netkeiba.

Date	Track	Race	Grade	Distance (Condition)	Entry	HN	Odds (Favored)	Finish	Time	Margins	Jockey	Winner (Runner-up)
2024 – two-year-old season
Aug 4	Sapporo	2yo debut		1,800m (Good)	8	7	3.9 (2)	1st	1:51.9	0.0	Takeshi Yokoyama	(Lien Bere)
Aug 31	Sapporo	Sapporo Nisai Stakes	3	1,800m (Soft)	12	1	23.4 (6)	2nd	1:50.3	0.0	Takeshi Yokoyama	Magic Sands
Dec 8	Kyoto	Hanshin Juvenile Fillies	1	1,600m (Firm)	18	12	10.5 (5)	1st	1:33.4	–0.2	Mirai Iwata	(Vip Daisy)
2025 – three-year-old season
Apr 13	Hanshin	Oka Sho	1	1,600m (Good)	18	9	3.8 (2)	2nd	1:33.1	0.0	Mirai Iwata	Embroidery
May 25	Tokyo	Yushun Himba	1	2,400m (Firm)	18	1	3.4 (2)	2nd	2:25.7	0.0	Mirai Iwata	Kamunyak

Legend:
Turf

== Pedigree ==
Pedigree of Arma Veloce
Sire Harbinger b. 2006	Dansili dk.b. 1996	Danehill	Danzig
Sire Harbinger b. 2006	Dansili dk.b. 1996	Danehill	Razyana
Sire Harbinger b. 2006	Dansili dk.b. 1996	Hasili	Kahyasi
Sire Harbinger b. 2006	Dansili dk.b. 1996	Hasili	Kerali
Sire Harbinger b. 2006	Penang Pearl b. 1996	Bering	Arctic Tern
Sire Harbinger b. 2006	Penang Pearl b. 1996	Bering	Beaune
Sire Harbinger b. 2006	Penang Pearl b. 1996	Guapa	Shareef Dancer
Sire Harbinger b. 2006	Penang Pearl b. 1996	Guapa	Sauceboat
Dam Rakuami ch. 2012	Daiwa Major ch. 2001	Sunday Silence	Halo
Dam Rakuami ch. 2012	Daiwa Major ch. 2001	Sunday Silence	Wishing Well
Dam Rakuami ch. 2012	Daiwa Major ch. 2001	Scarlet Bouquet	Northern Taste
Dam Rakuami ch. 2012	Daiwa Major ch. 2001	Scarlet Bouquet	Scarlet Ink
Dam Rakuami ch. 2012	Raise and Call b. 2001	Sakura Bakushin O	Sakura Yutaka O
Dam Rakuami ch. 2012	Raise and Call b. 2001	Sakura Bakushin O	Sakura Hagoromo
Dam Rakuami ch. 2012	Raise and Call b. 2001	Morriston Belle	Herat
Dam Rakuami ch. 2012	Raise and Call b. 2001	Morriston Belle	Barkerville Belle (Family: 4-m)

- Arma Veloce is an inbred by 4 x 5 to Northern Taste (Sakura Hagoromo's sire) and 5 x 5 x 5 x 5 to Northern Dancer (Danzig's, Shareef Dancer's, Northern Taste's and Herat's sire)
