= Japan Breeding Farms' Cup Nisai Yushun =

JBC Nisai Yushun
- Class: Domestic Grade 3 (JpnIII); International Listed
- Location: Mombetsu Racecourse; Monbetsu, Hokkaido
- Inaugurated: 3 November 2020 (6 years ago)
- Race type: Thoroughbred

Race information
- Distance: 1,800 metres (about 9 furlongs or 1 1/8 miles)
- Surface: Dirt
- Qualification: Two-years-old
- Weight: 56 kg Allowances; 1 kg for fillies 3 kg for S. Hemisphere
- Purse: ¥ 59,500,000 (as of 2026); 1st: ¥ 35,000,000

The Japan Breeding Farms' Cup Nisai Yushun (ジャパンブリーディングファームズカップ2歳優駿) is a Japanese Domestic Grade 3 flat race, held annually on November 3, or the national Culture Day. This race was inaugurated in 2020. Initially, the location was set to change yearly, but it has continued to be run at Mombetsu Racecourse in over a distance of 1,800 metres since the race's establishment.

The race was established to replace the traditional Hokkaido Nisai Yushun, and serving as a trial race for Zen-Nippon Nisai Yushun.

== Winners ==
Year	Winner	Jockey	Trainer	Owner	Time
2020	Lucky Dream (JPN)	Yamato Ishikawa (JPN)	(Japan) Kazuhiro Hayashi (HOK)	Masao Hayashi (JPN)	1:53.4
2021	Ice Giant (JPN)	Kosei Miura (JPN)	(Japan) Mizuki Takayanagi (JRA)	Katsumi Yoshida (JPN)	1:53.0
2022	Goraiko (JPN)	Yamato Ishikawa (JPN)	(Japan) Koichi Shintani (JRA)	Koji Oka (JPN)	1:53.5
2023	Forever Young (JPN)	Ryusei Sakai (JPN)	(Japan) Yoshito Yahagi (JRA)	Susumu Fujita (JPN)	1:54.3
2024	Soldier Field (JPN)	Fuma Ono (JPN)	(Japan) Hiroto Kawashima (HOK)	Honjo Co., Ltd. (JPN)	1:54.5
2025	Tamamo Freesia (JPN)	Kanta Taguchi (JPN)	(Japan) Yuki Ohashi (JRA)	Tamamo Co., Ltd. (JPN)	1:55.5
2026	Aureate (JPN)	Seinosuke Yoshimura (JPN)	Minoru Oguri (JPN)	G1 Racing Co. Ltd. (JPN)	1:55.7

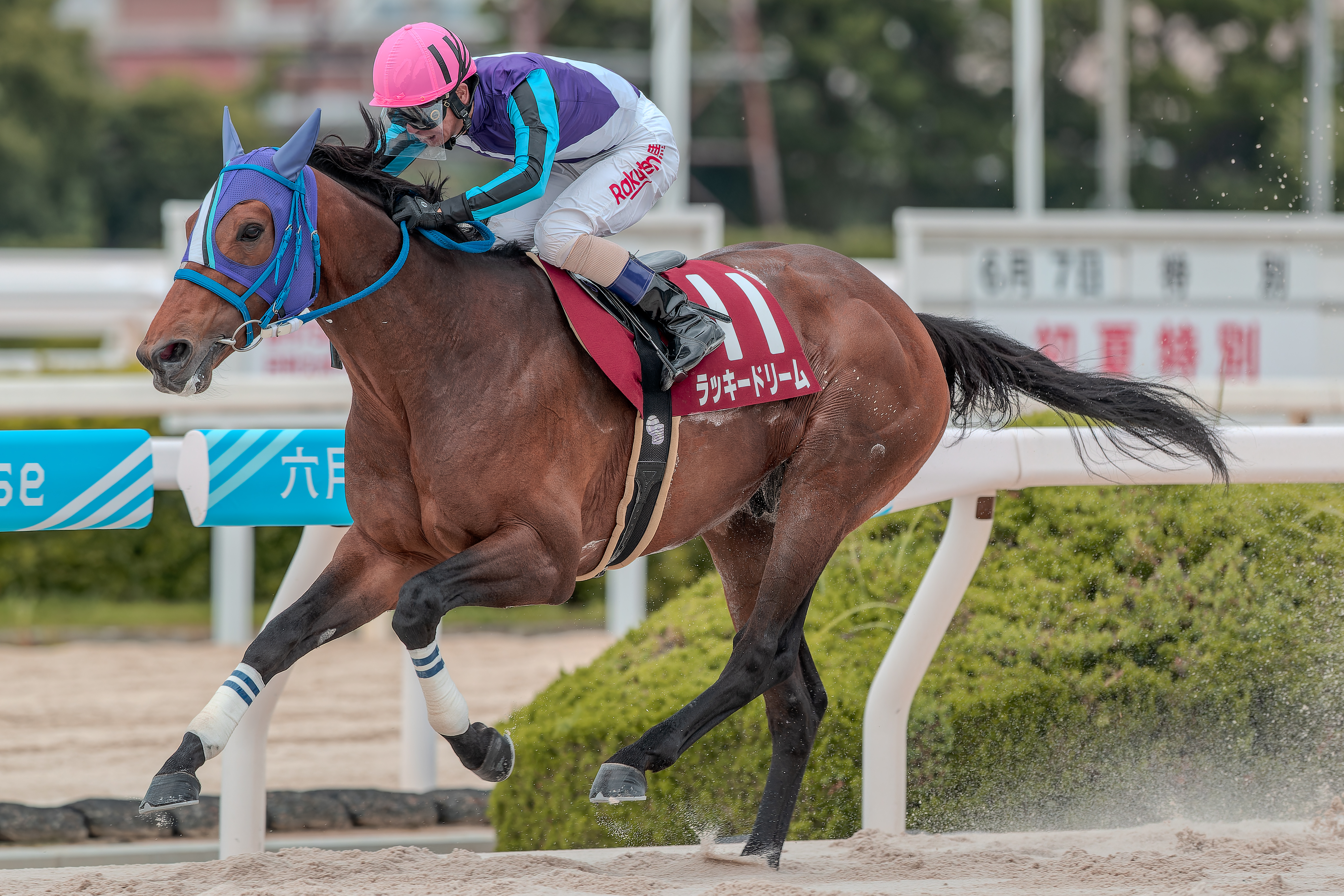
Lucky Dream, the first winner of JBC Nisai Yushun

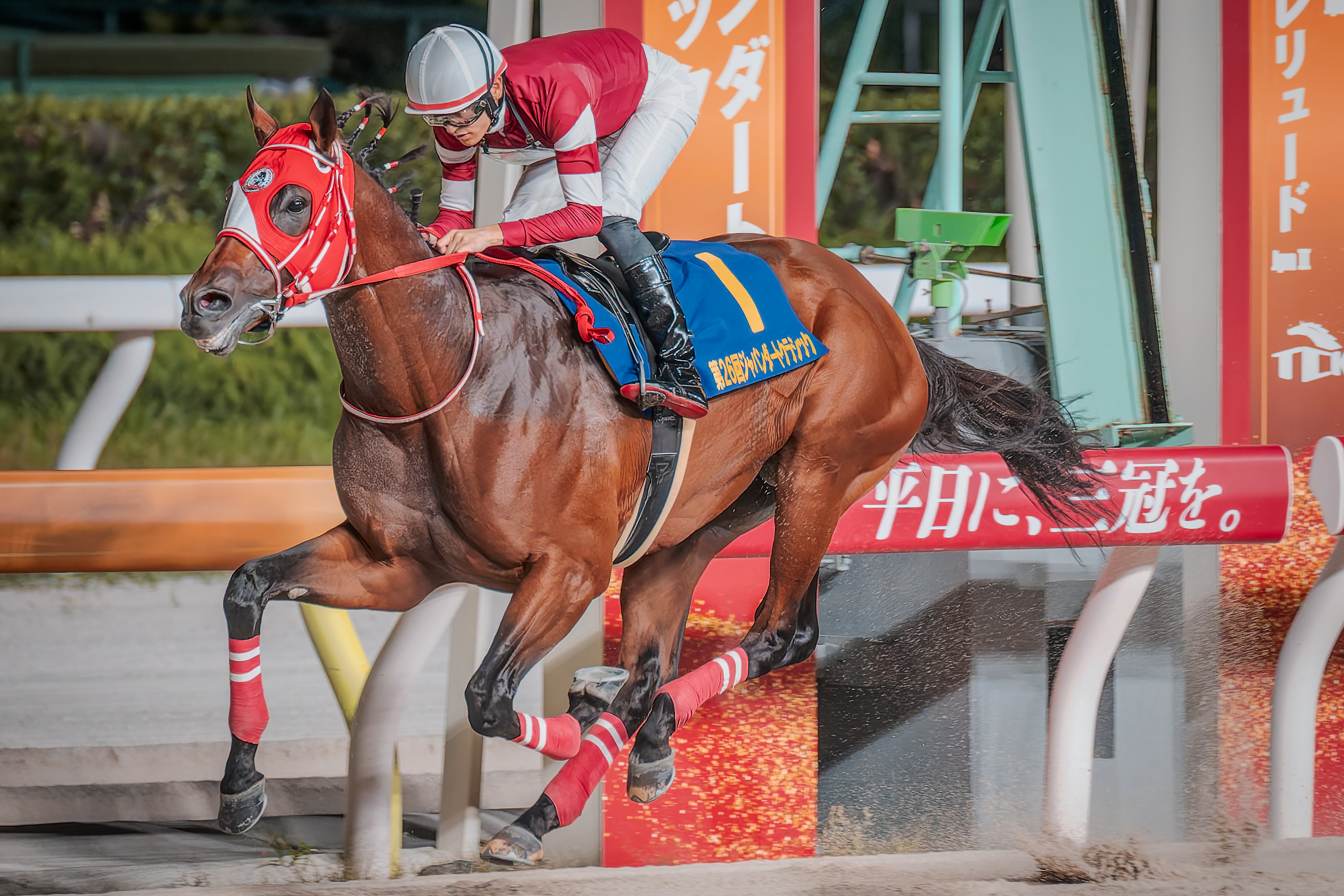
Forever Young, a Breeders' Cup Classic winner, won this race in 2023

== See also ==
- Horse racing in Japan
- List of Japanese flat horse races
