= Mombetsu Racecourse =

Horse racing venue in Hidaka, Hokkaido, Japan

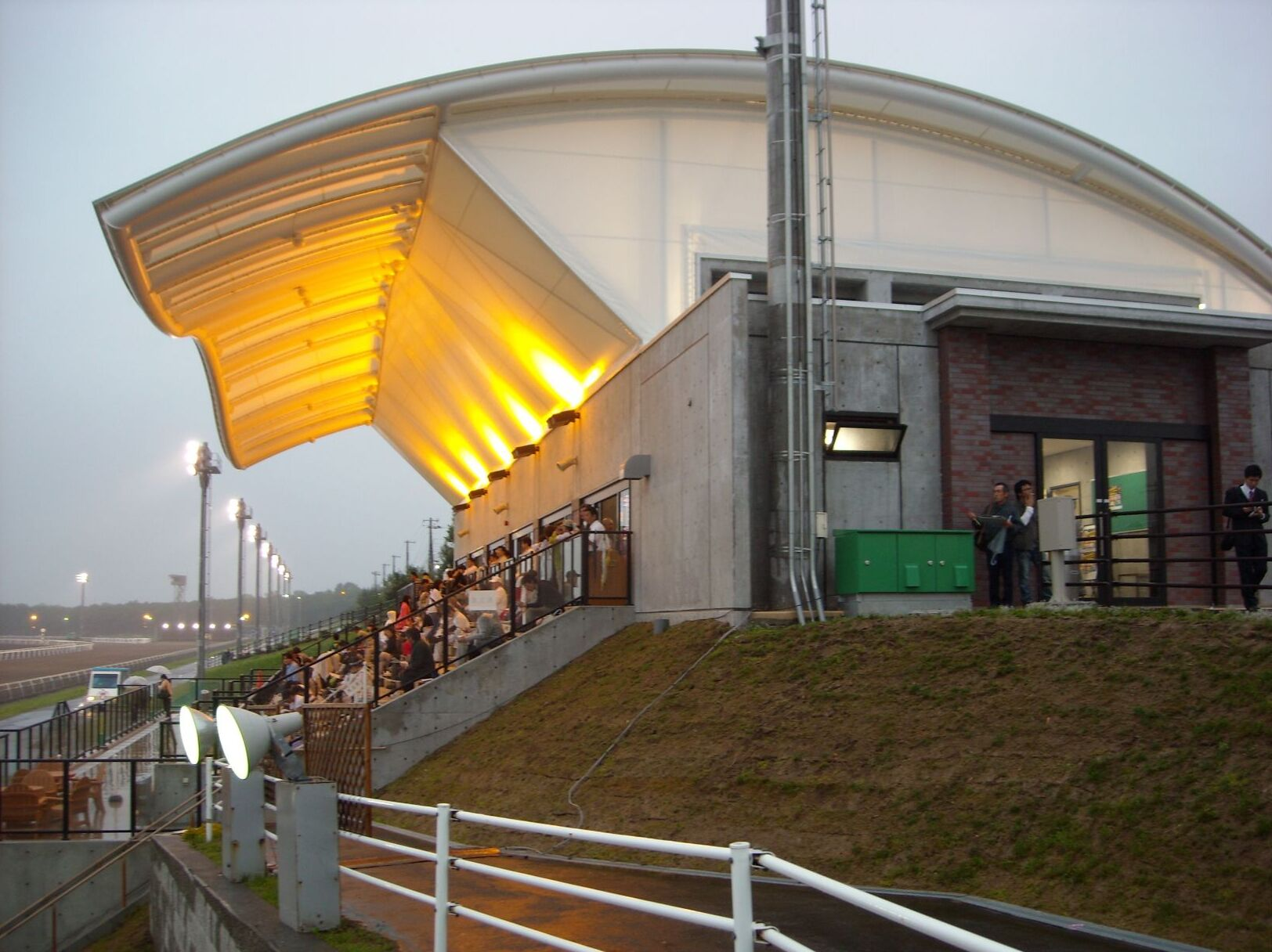
- The Polaris Stand
- Interactive map of Mombetsu Racecourse
- Location: Hidaka, Hokkaido, Japan
- Coordinates: 42°32′16.6″N 142°0′10.7″E
- Operated by: Hokkaido Keiba
- Date opened: December 8, 1997
- Capacity: 1,300
- Race type: Thoroughbred
- Course type: Dirt, right-handed
- Notable races: JBC Nisai Yushun

Mombetsu Racecourse (Japanese: 門別競馬場, romanized: Mombetsu Keibajō) is a horse racing venue in Hidaka, Hokkaido, Japan. It is operated by Hokkaido Keiba and is used for races conducted by the National Association of Racing (NAR). The racecourse opened on December 8, 1997.

== History ==
The site was previously used as the Mombetsu Thoroughbred Training Center, which served as a training and residential base for Hokkaido Keiba personnel and horses. The racecourse was developed from the existing training facilities and opened in December 1997.

From 2009, Hokkaido Keiba began holding its races at Mombetsu at night throughout the racing season. The night-racing programme is known as Grand Chariot Night, a name derived from the Big Dipper.

A second grandstand, the Polaris Stand, was added in 2009, providing an additional 800 places and bringing the combined capacity of the main grandstands to 1,300.

An inner course was constructed in 2015 to provide additional racing distances. It is 1,376 metres in circumference and is used for 1,500- and 1,600-metre races, while the outer course is 1,600 metres in circumference.

== Course ==
Mombetsu has a right-handed dirt course. The outer course has a circumference of 1,600 metres and a 330-metre straight, while the inner course has a circumference of 1,376 metres and a 218-metre straight. The track is 25 metres wide.

The racecourse is located in Hidaka, one of Japan's principal horse-breeding regions. The relatively mild climate and limited snowfall in the area also allow racing to continue later into the year than at some other Hokkaido venues.

== Notable races ==
The racecourse is the regular venue for the JBC Nisai Yushun, a major two-year-old dirt race conducted as part of the Japan Breeding Farms' Cup programme. NAR describes the race as being held at Mombetsu.

Month	Race	Distance	Age/Sex
JPN III
August	Breeders' Gold Cup	Dirt 2000m	3yo+ f/m
August	Hokkaido Sprint Cup	Dirt 1200m	3yo+
October	Edelweiss Sho	Dirt 1200m	2yo f
November	JBC Nisai Yushun	Dirt 1800m	2yo

=== Former races ===
- Grand Chariot Cup (JPNIII) - From 1996 until 2003
- Hokkaido Nisai Yushun (JPNIII) - From 1974 until 2019 (replaced by JBC Nisai Yushun)

== J-PLACE Mombetsu ==
The racecourse also operates as J-PLACE Mombetsu, an off-track betting facility for Japan Racing Association races. JRA lists J-PLACE Mombetsu among the Hokkaido facilities that sell tickets for all JRA races on applicable days.

== Facilities ==
The racecourse has two principal grandstands, the A Stand and the Polaris Stand, with a combined capacity of 1,300. A further visitor facility, Tonekko Lounge, was added as part of improvements carried out before the introduction of the JBC Nisai Yushun at Mombetsu in 2020.

The racecourse has free parking for approximately 1,000 vehicles. It is accessible by road from the Hidaka Expressway and by bus services from Sapporo Station.

== See also ==
- Horse racing in Japan
- National Association of Racing
