= Seina Imamura =

Japanese jockey (born 2003)

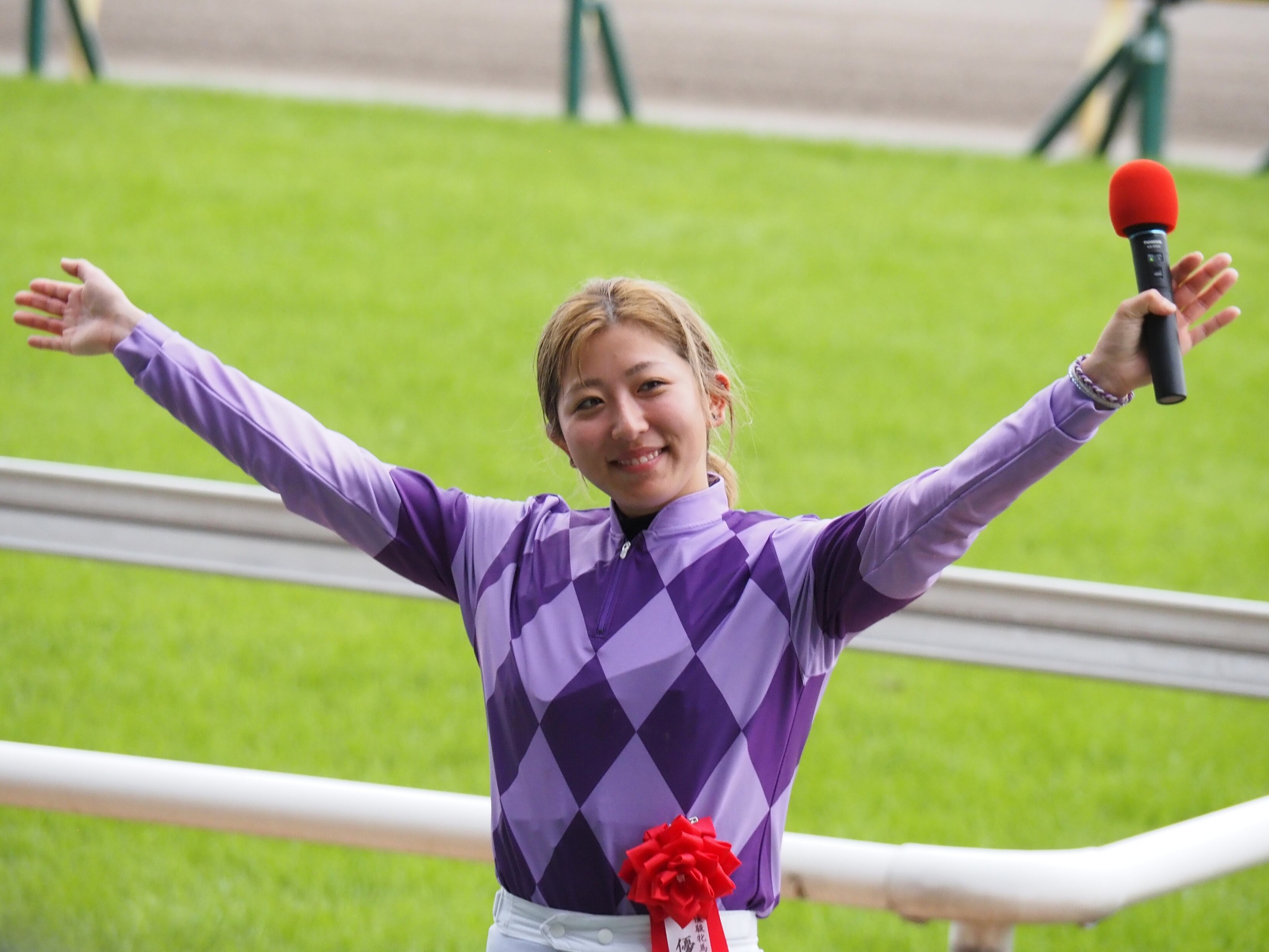
- Imamura after winning the 2026 Yushun Himba

Personal information
- Native name: 今村 聖奈
- Nationality: Japan
- Born: November 28, 2003 (age 22) Shiga Prefecture, Japan
- Height: 158.5 cm (5 ft 2 in)
- Weight: 47.4 kg (104 lb)

Horse racing career
- Sport: Horse racing
- Career wins: 110 (JRA)

Major racing wins
- Yushun Himba (2026)

Significant horses
- Juryoku Pierrot
- Updated on May 24, 2026

Seina Imamura (Japanese: 今村 聖奈, Hepburn: Imamura Seina; born November 28, 2003) is a Japanese-born Thoroughbred horse racing jockey.

Imamura entered the JRA (Japan Racing Association) Horse Racing School in 2018 and made her debut as a jockey in March 2022. Her father, Yasunari, is an assistant trainer of Yuji Iida's stable and former jockey who won the Grade 1 Nakayama Daishogai in 2001.

On July 3, 2022, Imamura won a graded stakes race on her first attempt, winning aboard T M Spada in the Group 3 CBC Sho. She became the fourth jockey in history to achieve this feat, as well as the second Japanese female jockey (after Nanako Fujita in 2019) to win a graded stakes race at a JRA racecourse.

In 2026, Imamura won the Yushun Himba (Japanese Oaks) aboard Juryoku Pierrot, becoming the first Japanese female jockey in history to win a Group 1 JRA race. She is also the second jockey in history (after Shigefumi Kumazawa) to win a Japanese classic race in their first start.

== Major wins ==
Japan

- Yushun Himba - (1) - Juryoku Pierrot (2026)
