= Urawa Racecourse =

Racecourse in Saitama Prefecture, Japan

Urawa Racecourse 浦和競馬場
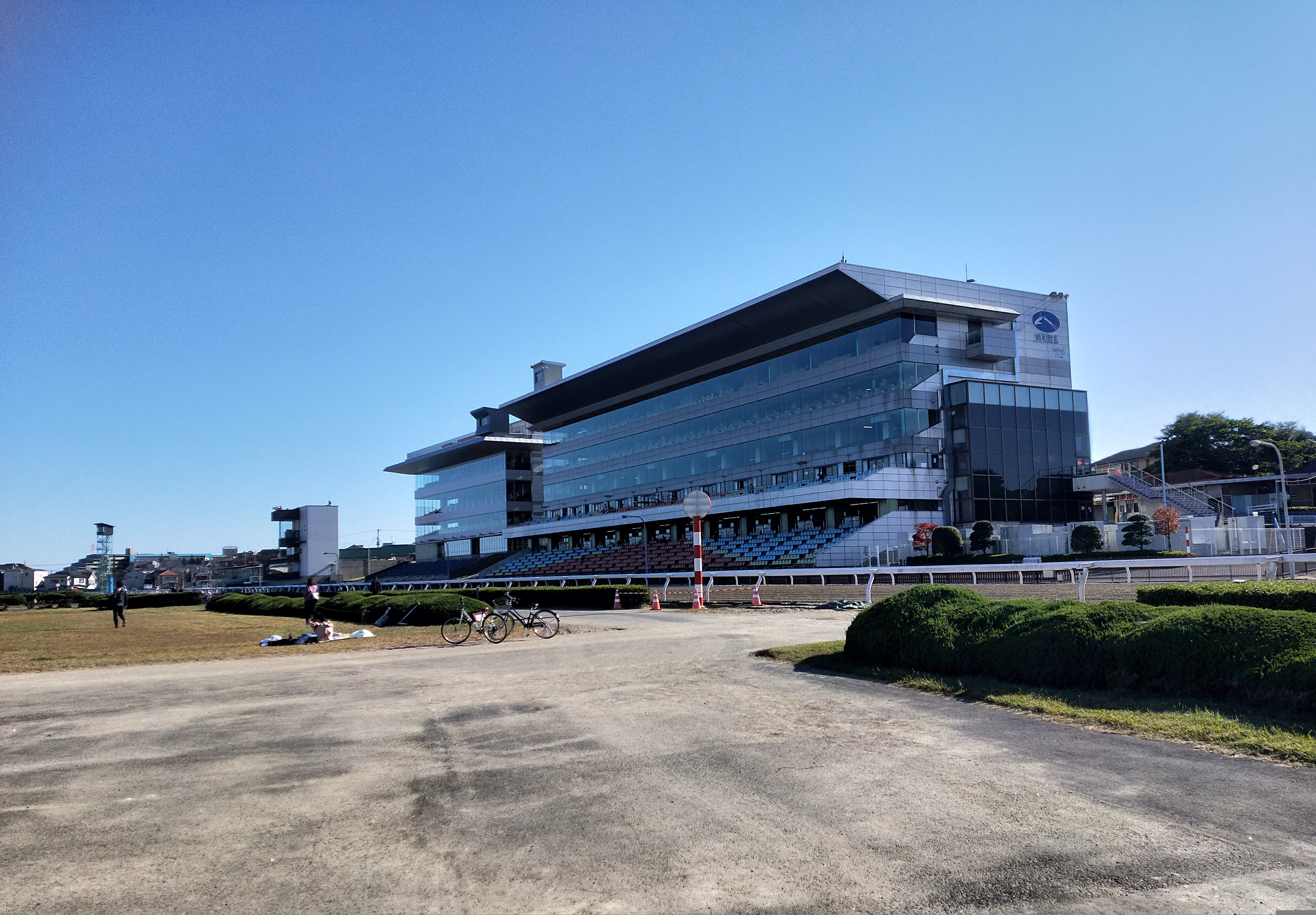
- Location: 1-8-42 Oyaba, Minami-ku, Saitama-shi, Saitama 336-0016
- Coordinates: 35.858°N 139.671°E
- Owned by: Saitama Urawa Horse Racing Association
- Date opened: October 5, 1947
- Race type: Flat
- Course type: Dirt
- Notable races: Oka Sho (Urawa)

Urawa Racecourse is a racecourse located in Saitama Prefecture, Japan.

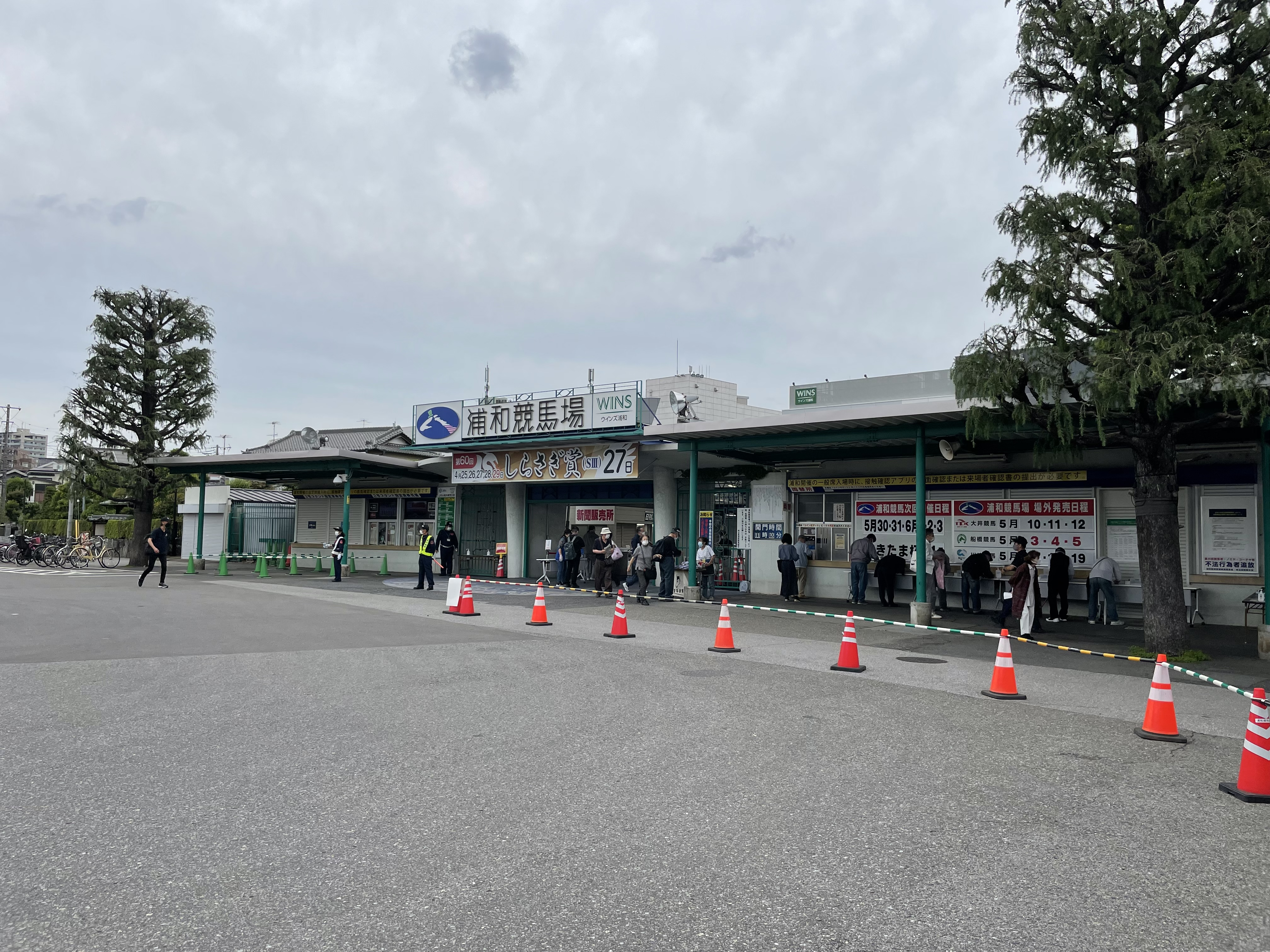
Entrance in April 2022

== Physical attributes ==
Urawa Racecourse is a dirt track, and the track is 1,200 meters in length. It is a left-handed (counter-clockwise) course.

It has an admission fee of 100 yen.

== Notable races ==
Month	Race	Distance	Age/Sex
JPN I
June	Sakitama Hai	Dirt 1400m	3yo+
JPN II
November	Urawa Kinen	Dirt 2000m	3yo+
JPN III
September	Teletama Hai Oval Sprint	Dirt 1400m	3yo+
JPN Unlisted
March	Oka Sho (Urawa)	Dirt 1200m	3yo
