= Mirai Iwata =

Japanese jockey (born 2000)

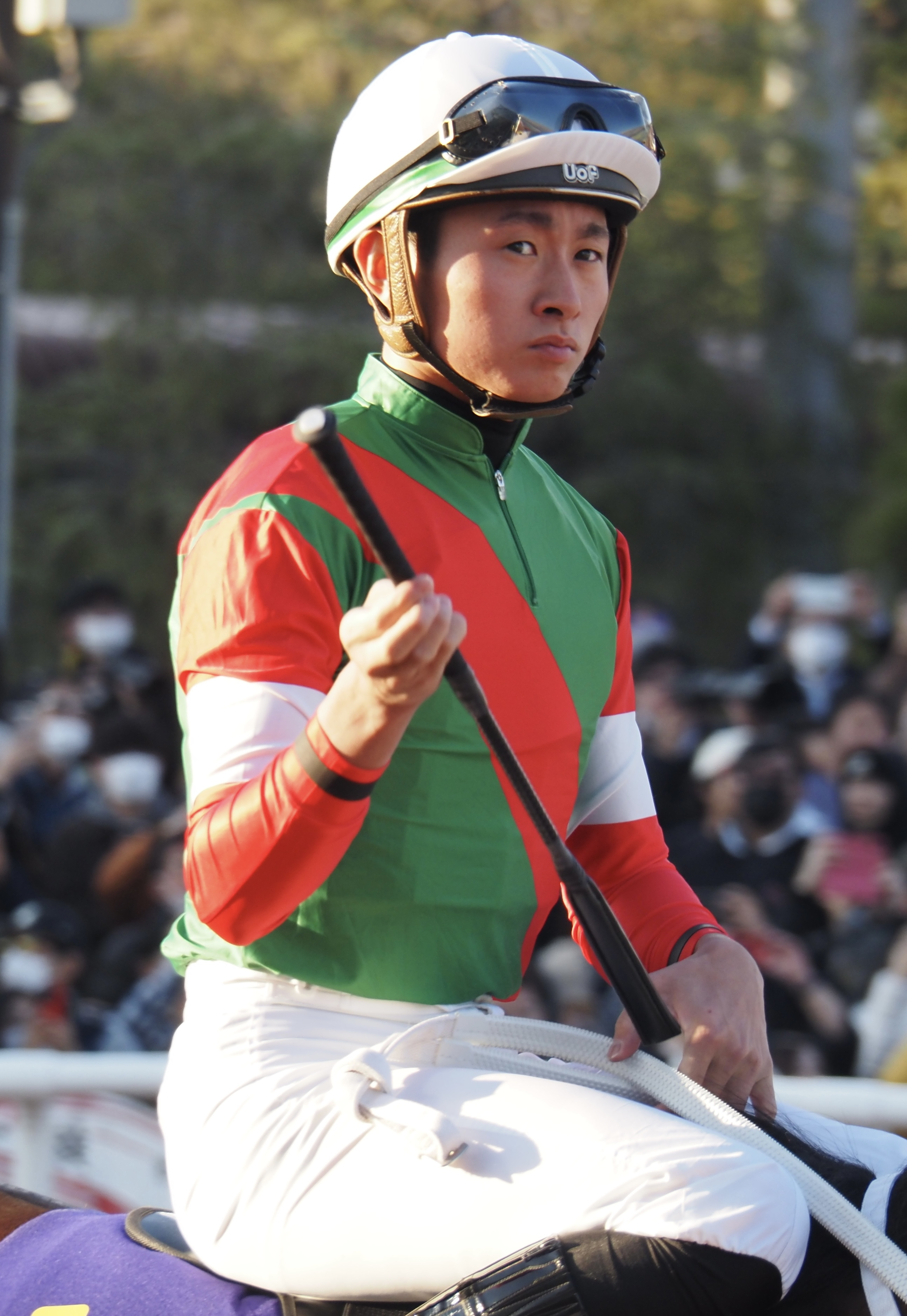
- Mirai Iwata at the 2023 Tokyo Daishoten

Personal information
- Native name: 岩田 望来
- Nationality: Japanese
- Born: May 31, 2000 (age 26) Hyogo Prefecture, Japan
- Height: 161.4 cm (5 ft 4 in)
- Weight: 52 kg (115 lb)

Horse racing career
- Sport: Horse racing
- Career wins: 700 (JRA); 27 (NAR)

Major racing wins
- JBC Ladies' Classic (2022); Hanshin Juvenile Fillies (2024); Zen-Nippon Nisai Yushun (2025); Sprinters Stakes (2026)

Significant horses
- Valle de la Luna, Arma Veloce, Pyromancer, Puro Magic
- Updated on September 27, 2026

Mirai Iwata (Japanese: 岩田 望来, Hepburn: Iwata Mirai; born May 31, 2000) is a Japanese jockey.

== Early life ==
Mirai was born in Hyogo, Japan, on May 31, 2000. He is the second son of Yasunari Iwata, a notable jockey affiliated with Sonoda Racecourse at the time who later transferred to the Japan Racing Association and won the Melbourne Cup with Delta Blues in 2006. Growing up watching his father, Mirai aspired to become a jockey. He enrolled in the JRA Horse Racing School in 2016, graduating in 2019 to earn his jockey license.

He was an apprentice jockey under trainer Hideaki Fujiwara at the Ritto Training Center from his school years until turning freelance in 2023.

== Career ==
Mirai made his jockey debut on March 2, 2019. He claimed his first victory with Pop Francais in an allowance race held at Hanshin Racecourse on March 30, 2019. On May 23, Mirai beat his father's horse by half a length at Sonoda Racecourse, marking the first ever top-two finish by father and son in Japanese horse racing history. On June 30, he made his graded stakes debut with Lavender Valley in the CBC Sho at Chukyo Racecourse, finishing tenth.

On December 5, 2020, Mirai achieved his 100th JRA victory with Violet Zinc in a maiden race at Chukyo Racecourse.

On December 19, 2021, Mirai achieved his 200th JRA victory with Valle de la Luna in a maiden race at Hanshin Racecourse, becoming the 60th active jockey to reach this milestone.

On February 19, 2022, Mirai claimed his first graded stakes victory with Lotus Land in the Kyoto Himba Stakes at Hanshin Racecourse. On November 3, he achieved his first Domestic Grade 1 (JpnI) victory with Valle de la Luna in the JBC Ladies' Classic at Morioka Racecourse. His father, Yasunari Iwata, had also won the race three times with Miracle Legend and Sambista. The following month, he rode T. M. Run Way to victory in an allowance race at Hanshin Racecourse, achieving his 300th JRA victory and becoming the 53rd active jockey to reach this milestone. Two weeks later, he guided Theo to victory in a maiden race, reaching 100 JRA wins in a single year for the first time in his career. At 22 years, 6 months, and 24 days old, he became the second-youngest jockey in history to achieve this feat, behind only Yutaka Take.

On May 4, 2023, Mirai announced that he would become a freelance jockey. On August 27, he captured the World All-Star Jockeys title in his first appearance, despite not winning any single race, by steadily accumulating points. This marked a father-son double in the series, as his father, Yasunari Iwata, had previously won the World Super Jockeys Series back in 2005. On October 22, he achieved his 400th JRA victory with Nasty Weather in an allowance race at Kyoto Racecourse, becoming the 47th active jockey to reach this milestone. On November 3, he was scheduled to ride Riot Grrrl in the JBC Ladies' Classic, but was not able to ride due to an accident, leading Taito Mori to take over the ride. Following this, Tokyo City Keiba announced on its official website that he had been suspended from riding for two days, stating that "he was late for the pre-race weigh-in for his ride on Riot Grrrl, leading to a change of jockey, which was deemed a failure to fulfill his duties as a jockey." However, on the same day in the JBC Sprint, he was unseated shortly after the start, resulting in an unexpected withdrawal from the race.

In June 2024, Mirai traveled to France for further training. Although he had originally planned to spend time in the United Kingdom, strict visa requirements prompted a change of plans. He consulted with Christophe Lemaire, who suggested France so he could introduce Mirai to local stables. He then spent a month each at the stables of Christopher Head and Jean-Claude Rouget. On August 8, he guided Meisho Bonheur to victory at Saint-Malo Racecourse, achieving his first victory since moving to France. On November 24, He rode Nebra Disk, the half-brother of Lys Gracieux, to victory in a debut race at Kyoto Racecourse. Just in 5 years, 8 months, and 23 days, he became the 36th active jockey to achieve 500 JRA wins and the third-fastest in history, trailing only Yutaka Take and Takemi Kaga. On December 8, he achieved his first JRA Grade 1 victory with Arma Veloce in the Hanshin Juvenile Fillies at Kyoto Racecourse.

In June 2025, Mirai announced that he would travel to the United Kingdom, the home of his idol Ryan Moore, which had been impossible the previous year due to visa issues. He would spend time training at William Haggas's stable for two months. On December 17, he claimed another Domestic Grade 1 victory with Pyromancer in the Zen-Nippon Nisai Yushun at Kawasaki Racecourse, holding off Tamamo Freesia by a neck. A week later, he achieved his 600th JRA victory with Dea Veloce in a maiden race at Hanshin Racecourse, becoming the 85th jockey in history and the 31st active jockey to reach this milestone.

On August 30, 2026, Mirai guided Zoroastro to victory over Rodeo Drive in the Niigata Kinen at Niigata Racecourse. Later that day, he achieved his 700th JRA victory with Crying Now, becoming the 72th jockey in history and the 28th active jockey to reach the milestone. One month later, he won the Sprinters Stakes by riding Puro Magic at the front from start to finish.

== Major wins ==
Japan

- Hanshin Juvenile Fillies - (1) - Arma Veloce (2024)
- Japan Breeding Farms' Cup Ladies' Classic - (1) - Valle de la Luna (2022)
- Sprinters Stakes - (1) - Puro Magic (2026)
- Zen-Nippon Nisai Yushun - (1) - Pyromancer (2025)
