= Danon The Kid =

Japanese Thoroughbred racehorse

Danon The Kid; ダノンザキッド
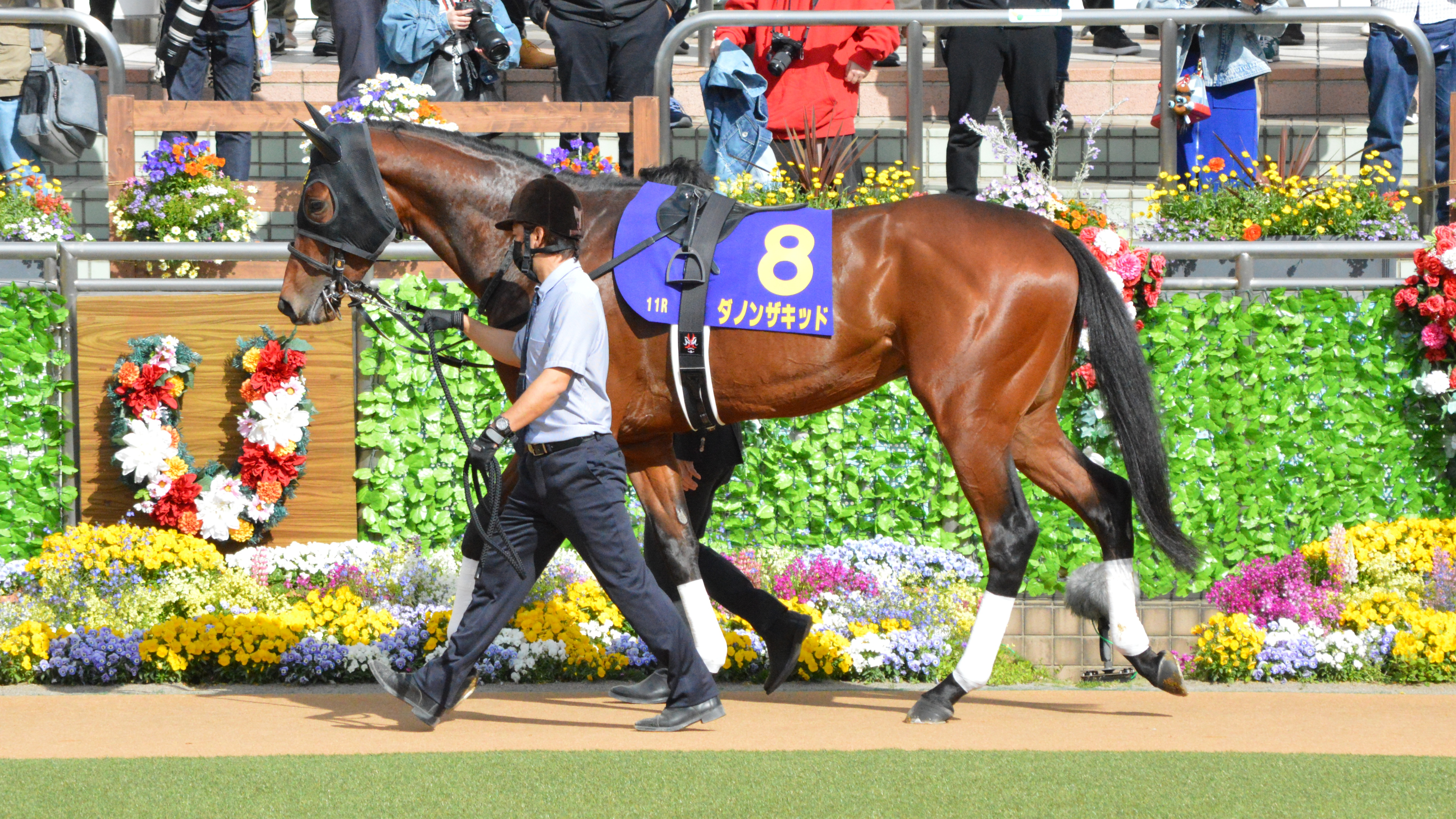
- Danon The Kid in 2021
- Sire: Just A Way
- Grandsire: Heart's Cry
- Dam: Epic Love
- Damsire: Dansili
- Sex: Colt
- Foaled: 29 January 2018
- Country: Japan
- Colour: Bay
- Breeder: Northern Farm
- Owner: Danox Co Ltd
- Racing colours
- Trainer: Takayuki Yasuda
- Jockey: Yuga Kawada
- Record: 18: 3-2-5
- Earnings: 460,866,300 JPY; Japan : 336,615,000 JPY; HK : 8,305,000 HKD

Major wins
- Tokyo Sports Hai Nisai Stakes (2020); Hopeful Stakes (2020)

Awards
- JRA Award for Best Two-Year-Old Colt (2020)
- Last updated on November 19, 2023

Danon The Kid (Japanese: ダノンザキッド foaled 29 January 2018) is a Japanese Thoroughbred racehorse. He was one of the best two-year-olds in Japan in 2020 when he won all three of his races including the Tokyo Sports Hai Nisai Stakes and the Hopeful Stakes. In 2021 he finished third in the Mile Championship.

== Background ==
Danon The Kid is a bay colt bred in Japan by Northern Farm. As a yearling in 2017 he was consigned to the Select Sale and was bought for ¥108,000,000 by Danox Co Ltd. The colt was sent into training with Takayuki Yasuda.

He was from the third crop of foals sired by Just A Way, who won the Tenno Sho, Dubai Duty Free Stakes and Yasuda Kinen and was rated the best racehorse in the world in 2014. His other progeny have included the Fillies' Revue winner Epos and Velox who was placed in all three legs of the Japanese Triple Crown.

Danon The Kid's dam Epic Love was an Irish-bred mare who showed high-class form in France, winning the Prix Vanteaux and finishing second in the Prix Saint-Alary. Her granddam Alcando was a very successful racemare who won the Firth of Clyde Stakes in Scotland, the Prix de Psyche in France and the Beverly Hills Handicap in California. Alcando was descended from the Irish broodmare Charwoman (foaled in 1933), making her a distant relative of May Hill.

== Racing career ==
=== 2020: two-year-old season ===
Danon The Kid made his racecourse debut at Hanshin Racecourse on 28 June when he was ridden by Yuichi Kitamura in a race for newcomers over 1800 metres on good ground. Starting the 3.7/1 second favourite in a fourteen-runner field he raced in third place before taking the lead in the straight and drawing away to win by three lengths from Wonderful Town. After the summer break the colt returned to the track for the Grade 3 Tokyo Sports Hai Nisai Stakes over 1800 metres at Tokyo Racecourse on 23 November and started the 0.7/1 favourite against nine opponents. Ridden by Yuga Kawada he was restrained in third place before making rapid progress to take the lead 300 metres from the finish and won by one and a quarter lengths from Titleholder with Jun Blue Sky in third.

For his third and final run of the year Danon The Kid was stepped up in class and distance to contest the Grade 1 Hopeful Stakes over 2000 metres at Nakayama Racecourse on 26 December. Ridden by Kawada he went off the 1.1/1 favourite in a fifteen-runner field which also included the undefeated colts Land of Liberty, Orthoclase and Yoho Lake. He raced just behind the leaders as Land of Liberty set the pace from Titleholder, Orthoclase and Vanishing Point before the complexion of the race changed abruptly on the final turn as Land of Liberty veered to the left and was pulled up by his jockey. Danon The Kid took the lead on the outside in the straight and rallied after being headed by Orthoclase to regain the advantage in the last 100 metres and win by one and a quarter lengths. Kawada said after the race "The stable staff did a great job in tuning up the colt and he ran much better than he did in his previous start but still, he couldn't find a good rhythm and was not steady in the last two corners today. There is still a lot of room for improvement and we intend to work hard so he can kick off a good three-year-old campaign."

In January 2021 Danon The Kid was voted Best Two-Year-Old Colt at the JRA Awards for 2020, taking 262 of the 283 votes. In the official Japanese rankings Danon The Kid was rated the best two-year-old colt of 2020, one pound ahead of Grenadier Guards.

=== 2021: three-year-old season ===
On 7 March Danon The Kid began his second campaign in the Grade 2 Yayoi Sho over 2000 metres at Nakayama and started the 0.3/1 favourite against nine opponents. Ridden by Kawada he settled in fourth place before making progress in the straight but was never able to reach the leaders and sustained his first defeat as he finished third behind Titleholder and Schnell Meister. Yasuda later commented "He didn't quite get into the flow of things, and the pace was slow". Despite his defeat the colt started favourite for the Grade 1 Satsuki Sho over the same course and distance on 18 April. He raced just behind the leaders for most of the way but after being switched to the outside in the straight he tired badly and came home fifteenth of the sixteen runners behind Efforia.

Danon The Kid was off the track for more than six months before returning in the Grade 2 Fuji Stakes over 1600 metres at Tokyo on 23 October and finishing fourth behind the filly Songline. Four weeks later the colt was moved back into Grade 1 company for the all-aged Mile Championship over 1600 metres at Tokyo. Starting a 15.1/1 outsider he raced in eighth place before coming on strongly in the straight to take third place behind Gran Alegria and Schnell Meister, beaten by just over a length by the winner.

=== 2022: four-year-old season ===
Danon The Kid started the year with the race at the Nakayama Kinen. He was the favourite for the race but he started the race aggressively and moved to the front too early before being gassed out and finished in seventh place. His jockey, Yuga Kawada suggested that his defeat may have come due to his bad compatibility with Nakayama Racecourse in general as he had finished in 15th back in the Satsuki Sho the previous year. The next race he joined was the Yasuda Kinen in Tokyo. When the race began, Danon The Kid started well and even took a lead at one point. As the race progressed, he slowed down at the 100 metres mark and was passed by others near the end. He finished in sixth place at the end. Despite the finish, Kawada noted that their race was better this time.

He raced in the summer by joining the Sekiya Kinen in August. He started well in the mid pack and unleashed the fastest final spurt but due to the slow pace of the race in general, it favoured the front-runner horses which placed first and second at the end. Danon The Kid placed in third at the line, 0.1 seconds behind the winner, Win Carnelian. He started the autumn leg with the Mainichi Okan. This time, he would be paired with another jockey, Keita Tosaki, as Kawada had picked Lei Papale this time around. The horse was rushed during the start and damaged the gate, prompting him to restart from the outside. This change did not affect him as he made a good start and ran in fourth place. He briefly took the lead in the straight, but was eventually overtaken by the winner, Salios and Justin Cafe, ending up in third place behind them. Due to the botched start, Danon The Kid was suspended from racing between October 10 and October 30 and would be re-evaluated at the training ground.

On November 22, he ran in the Mile Championship under Yuichi Kitamura. In the race, he was on par with the leading pack lined up in the middle of the straight. Just before the finishing line, he broke through a narrow gap and ran well, finishing second behind Serifos who capitalized on the outside track for his final sprint. He closed the season with a run in the Hong Kong Cup at the end of the season. Sticking with Kitamura, he saved his energy and took a narrow path in the straight to move forward from the pack. At the final straight, he sprinted but was unable to catch Romantic Warrior and finished in second place.

=== 2023: five-year-old season ===
As the previous season, he chose Nakayama Kinen as his season opener. This race was a poor appearance for him as he slipped in the gate during the start and ended up in 11th place. This incident suspended him for the second time in his career from February 27 until March 28. After the suspension ended, he joined the Osaka Hai. This race, Kazuo Yokoyama took over the reins from Kitamura. On the race day, Danon The Kid made headway to fourth early from the no.13 stall, gradually closed in on the leaders to enter the lane in second but failed to catch the eventual winner and weakened in the final strides to be outrun by the favorite for third place.

Danon The Kid embarked for the Hong Kong trip for the second time in the Queen Elizabeth II Cup in late April. This time, he finished in fifth place, losing to Romantic Warrior once again. He then got back with Kitamura for his next race, the Takarazuka Kinen. He ran well, mainly in the fourth and fifth positions, for the most of the race but gradually fell behind and ended up at 13th place. In the autumn, he tried the Mile Championship for the second time. This time, Kitamura handled him mostly at the back pack majorly on the eleventh position initially. Then, he capitalized on an opening in the last 200 metres and finished fifth at the line.

He closed the season with the Hong Kong Mile race. Danon The Kid struggled with the ground here and ended up in 12th place. Kitamura noted about the ground and he cannot secure a cover for his pacing on the race. On December 22, it was announced that Danon The Kid would retire from racing and assigned to be a stud at the Big Red Farm in Niikappu, Hokkaido.

== Racing form ==
Danon The Kid won three races and placed in another seven out of 18 starts. This data is available in JBIS, netkeiba and HKJC.

Date	Track	Race	Grade	Distance (Condition)	Entry	HN	Odds (Favored)	Finish	Time	Margins	Jockey	Winner (Runner-up)
2020 – two-year-old season
Jun 28	Hanshin	2yo Newcomer		1,800 m (Good)	14	12	4.7 (2)	1st	1:48.3	–0.5	Yuichi Kitamura	(Wonderful Town)
Nov 23	Tokyo	Tokyo Sports Hai Nisai Stakes	3	1,800 m (Firm)	10	3	1.7 (1)	1st	1:47.5	–0.2	Yuga Kawada	(Titleholder)
Dec 26	Nakayama	Hopeful Stakes	1	2,000 m (Firm)	15	10	2.1 (1)	1st	2:02.8	–0.2	Yuga Kawada	(Orthoclase)
2021 – three-year-old season
Mar 7	Nakayama	Yayoi Sho	2	2,000 m (Firm)	10	2	1.3 (1)	3rd	2:02.3	0.3	Yuga Kawada	Titleholder
Apr 18	Nakayama	Satsuki Sho	1	2,000 m (Good)	16	8	3.3 (1)	15th	2:03.1	2.5	Yuga Kawada	Efforia
Oct 23	Tokyo	Fuji Stakes	2	1,600 m (Firm)	17	16	4.2 (2)	4th	1:33.7	0.5	Yuga Kawada	Songline
Nov 21	Hanshin	Mile Championship	1	1,600 m (Firm)	16	13	16.1 (5)	3rd	1:32.8	0.2	Yuga Kawada	Gran Alegria
2022 – four-year-old season
Feb 27	Nakayama	Nakayama Kinen	2	1,800 m (Firm)	16	15	2.6 (1)	7th	1:47.8	1.4	Yuga Kawada	Panthalassa
Jun 5	Tokyo	Yasuda Kinen	1	1,600 m (Firm)	18	4	10.9 (7)	6th	1:32.5	0.2	Yuga Kawada	Songline
Aug 14	Niigata	Sekiya Kinen	3	1,600 m (Good)	14	8	3.8 (2)	3rd	1:33.4	0.1	Yuga Kawada	Win Carnelian
Oct 9	Tokyo	Mainichi Okan	2	1,800 m (Firm)	10	4	6.7 (4)	3rd	1:44.3	0.2	Keita Tosaki	Salios
Nov 20	Hanshin	Mile Championship	1	1,600 m (Firm)	17	3	26.0 (8)	2nd	1:32.7	0.2	Yuichi Kitamura	Serifos
Dec 11	Sha Tin	Hong Kong Cup	1	2,000 m (Good)	12	6	17.9 (6)	2nd	2:00.4	0.7	Yuichi Kitamura	Romantic Warrior
2023 – five-year-old season
Feb 26	Nakayama	Nakayama Kinen	2	1,800 m (Firm)	14	1	4.4 (2)	11th	1:48.2	1.1	Yuichi Kitamura	Hishi Iguazu
Apr 2	Hanshin	Osaka Hai	1	2,000 m (Firm)	16	13	32.8 (10)	3rd	1:57.4	0.0	Kazuo Yokoyama	Jack d'Or
Apr 30	Sha Tin	Queen Elizabeth II Cup	1	2,000 m (Good)	7	3	9.6 (5)	5th	2:02.7	0.8	Vincent C Y Ho	Romantic Warrior
Jun 25	Hanshin	Takarazuka Kinen	1	2,200 m (Firm)	17	3	35.1 (8)	13th	2:12.6	1.4	Yuichi Kitamura	Equinox
Nov 19	Kyoto	Mile Championship	1	1,600 m (Firm)	16	6	24.9 (6)	5th	1:32.8	0.3	Yuichi Kitamura	Namur
Dec 10	Sha Tin	Hong Kong Mile	1	1,600 m (Firm)	14	3	26.4 (7)	12th	1:35.5	1.4	Yuichi Kitamura	Golden Sixty

Legend:
Turf

== Pedigree ==
Pedigree of Danon The Kid (JPN), bay colt, 2018
Sire Just A Way (JPN) 2009	Heart's Cry (JPN); 12001	Sunday Silence (USA)	Halo
Sire Just A Way (JPN) 2009	Heart's Cry (JPN); 12001	Sunday Silence (USA)	Wishing Well
Sire Just A Way (JPN) 2009	Heart's Cry (JPN); 12001	Irish Dance	Tony Bin (IRE)
Sire Just A Way (JPN) 2009	Heart's Cry (JPN); 12001	Irish Dance	Buper Dance (USA)
Sire Just A Way (JPN) 2009	Sibyl (JPN); 1999	Wild Again (USA)	Icecapade
Sire Just A Way (JPN) 2009	Sibyl (JPN); 1999	Wild Again (USA)	Bushel-N-Peck
Sire Just A Way (JPN) 2009	Sibyl (JPN); 1999	Charon (USA)	Mo Exception
Sire Just A Way (JPN) 2009	Sibyl (JPN); 1999	Charon (USA)	Double Wiggle
Dam Epic Love (IRE) 2008	Dansili (GB); 1996	Danehill (USA)	Danzig
Dam Epic Love (IRE) 2008	Dansili (GB); 1996	Danehill (USA)	Razyana
Dam Epic Love (IRE) 2008	Dansili (GB); 1996	Hasili (IRE)	Kahyasi
Dam Epic Love (IRE) 2008	Dansili (GB); 1996	Hasili (IRE)	Kerali (GB)
Dam Epic Love (IRE) 2008	Leopard Hunt (USA); 2001	Diesis (GB)	Sharpen Up
Dam Epic Love (IRE) 2008	Leopard Hunt (USA); 2001	Diesis (GB)	Doubly Sure
Dam Epic Love (IRE) 2008	Leopard Hunt (USA); 2001	Alcando (IRE)	Alzao (USA)
Dam Epic Love (IRE) 2008	Leopard Hunt (USA); 2001	Alcando (IRE)	Kaniz (GB) (Family: 15-a)
