= Melody Lane (horse) =

Japanese Thoroughbred racehorse (foaled 2016)

Melody Lane; メロディーレーン
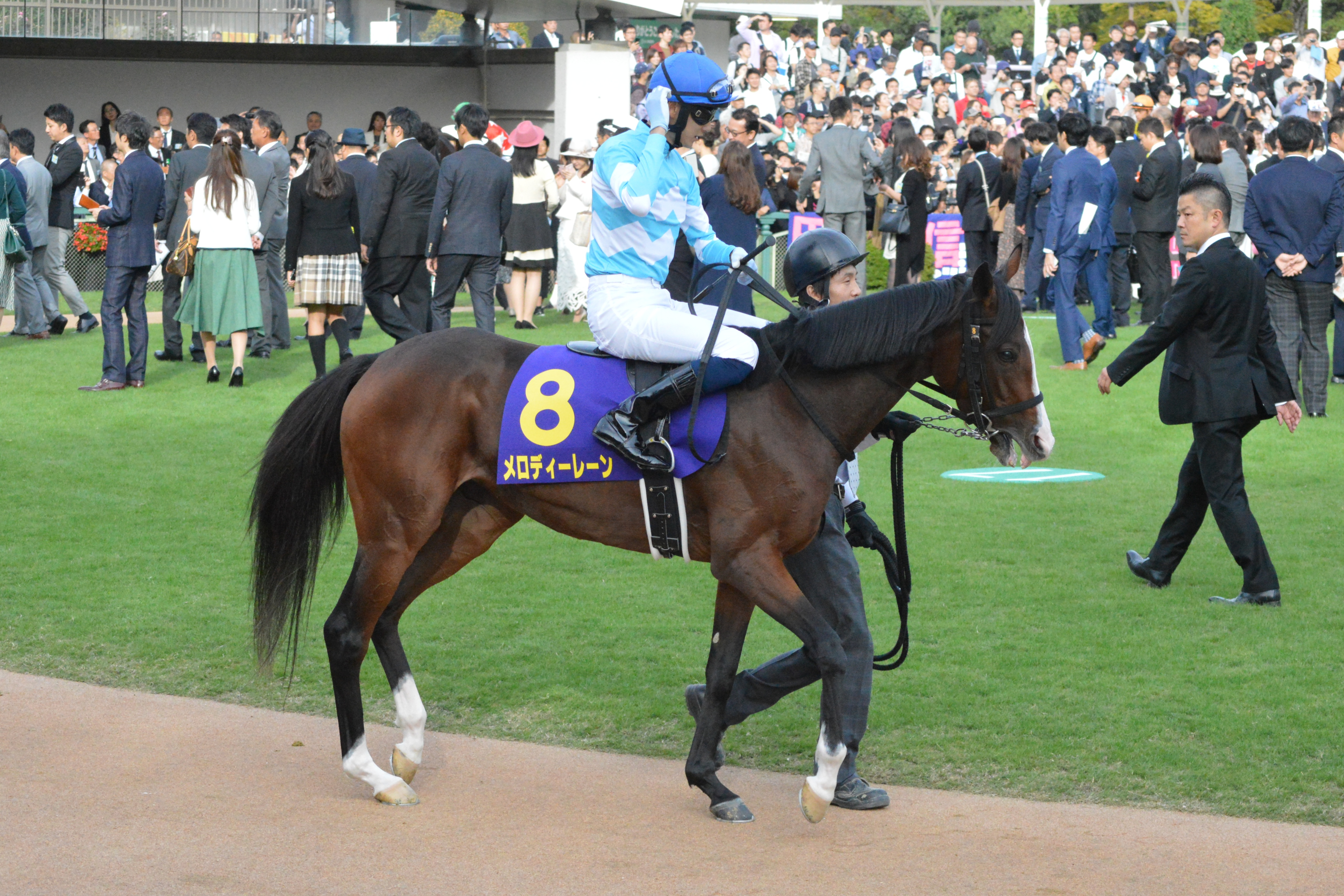
- Melody Lane at the 2019 Kikuka Sho
- Breed: Thoroughbred
- Sire: Orfevre (JPN)
- Grandsire: Stay Gold (JPN)
- Dam: Mowen (GB)
- Damsire: Motivator (GB)
- Sex: Mare
- Foaled: 12 February 2016 (age 10)
- Country: Japan
- Colour: Bay
- Breeder: Okada Stud
- Owner: Makio Okada (LEX PRO)
- Racing colours
- Trainer: Naoyuki Morita
- Jockey: Hayato Mitsuya; Mirai Iwata; Ryusei Sakai; Kazuo Yokoyama; Akira Sugawara; Taisei Danno; Seina Imamura; Hideaki Miyuki
- Record: 36: 4-0-4
- Earnings: ¥85,909,000

Melody Lane (Japanese: メロディーレーン, Merodī Rēn; foaled 12 February 2016) is a retired Japanese Thoroughbred racehorse and broodmare. She recorded four wins from thirty-six starts between 2018 and 2024, and finished fifth in the 2019 Kikuka Shō (GI). She held multiple JRA minimum bodyweight records, having raced between 330 kg and 358 kg, and is the older half-sister of Titleholder. Her name means "a cultivar of camellia".

== Background ==
Melody Lane is a bay mare bred in Shinhidaka, Hokkaido, by Okada Stud. She was sired by Orfevre, a son of Stay Gold, and her dam was Mowen (GB), a mare by Motivator who won the 2013 Tancho Stakes. She was offered through the LEX PRO ownership system and was owned by Makio Okada. She was trained by Naoyuki Morita at the JRA's Ritto Training Center. Her younger half-brother Titleholder (by Duramente) won the 2021 Kikuka-shō, the 2022 Tennō Shō (Spring), and the 2022 Takarazuka Kinen.

=== Body weight ===
The average body weight of a Thoroughbred is between 450 kg and 500 kg. Melody Lane raced between a minimum of 330 kg and a maximum of 358 kg. On 13 October 2018, her debut weight of 336 kg broke the JRA minimum bodyweight record for a two-year-old, previously 340 kg set by Silver Socius in 1979. On 2 March 2019, she ran at 330 kg, equalling the JRA minimum bodyweight record set by Gran Rose. Her winning weight of 340 kg on 15 June 2019 broke the JRA minimum winning bodyweight record of 350 kg set by Jeanne d'Arc in 1972, and her 346 kg win on 24 January 2021 broke the JRA minimum special-race winning weight record since 1986 by 20 kg. Her 340 kg at the 2019 Kikuka Shō was the minimum bodyweight for a graded stakes runner in JRA history.

== Racing career ==
=== 2018: two-year-old season ===
Melody Lane debuted on 13 October 2018 in a 2-year-old newcomer race over 1600 metres on turf at Kyoto Racecourse. Ridden by apprentice jockey Hayato Mitsuya, she started 16th favourite and finished 10th. She ran twice more in maiden races that year, finishing third on 25 November and sixth on 23 December.

=== 2019: three-year-old season ===
She began the season on 2 March at Kokura Racecourse, finishing 10th. After three further maiden defeats, she finished third over 2400 metres on 26 May. On 15 June at Hanshin Racecourse, ridden by Mirai Iwata, she recorded her first win, defeating Dandyism by 1.5 seconds at 340 kg.

After a 13th-place finish over 2000 metres on 13 July, she was stepped up to 2600 metres on 28 September at Hanshin. She won by 0.4 seconds in a time of 2:37.1, a Japanese record for turf 2600 metres, at a winning weight of 338 kg. The record stood until 20 March 2021, when it was broken by Divine Force.

As she held no classic nominations, her connections paid a supplementary registration fee of 2 million yen to enter the Kikuka Shō. After the withdrawals of Admire Justa, Admire Squall, and Barack Palinka, she passed the final ballot to secure a run. She was the first filly to contest the Kikuka Shō since Polka Mazurka in 2009. In the race on 20 October at Kyoto, ridden by Ryusei Sakai, she started 12th favourite and finished fifth, 0.4 seconds behind the winner World Premiere, recording the joint-fastest final three furlongs of the race at 35.7 seconds.

She was placed 21st in the Arima Kinen fan vote with 20,118 votes but did not enter the race. She concluded her season on 21 December in the Esaka Special at Hanshin, finishing fourth.

=== 2020: four-year-old season ===
Melody Lane started the season on 19 January in the Nikkei Shinshun Hai (GII) at Kyoto, carrying top-light 49 kg and finishing ninth. She declined an invitation to the Dubai Gold Cup. On 22 March, she ran in the Hanshin Daishoten (GII), finishing fifth behind You Can Smile, with no time difference to the third and fourth place finishers. On 3 May, she ran in the Tenno Sho (Spring) (GI) at Kyoto, finishing 11th. On 5 July, she finished third in the Hyogo Tokubetsu at Hanshin.

=== 2021: five-year-old season ===
She began the year on 24 January in the Uminonakamichi Tokubetsu at Kokura. Ridden by Kazuo Yokoyama on heavy ground, she won by 0.2 seconds at 346 kg. She then finished seventh in the Shorai Stakes on 27 February, tenth in the Osaka-Hamburg Cup on 11 April, and 11th in the Tenno Sho (Spring) on 2 May. After a tenth-place finish in the June Stakes on 12 June, she ran in the Takarazuka Kinen (GI) on 27 June, finishing 11th.

On 31 October, she won the Koto Stakes over 3000 metres at Hanshin by 0.1 seconds, entering the open class. The win came one week after Titleholder won the Kikuka Shō over the same course and distance. On 26 December, she met Titleholder directly for the first time in the Arima Kinen (GI), finishing 15th behind Efforia.

=== 2022: six-year-old season ===
She started the season on 19 February in the Diamond Stakes (GIII) at Tokyo, finishing 13th. On 1 May, she ran in the Tenno Sho (Spring), finishing ninth behind Titleholder. On 26 June, she ran in the Takarazuka Kinen, again won by Titleholder, finishing 13th. She concluded the season on 3 December in the Stayers Stakes (GII) at Nakayama, finishing fifth.

=== 2023: seven-year-old season ===
She ran four times in 2023: 11th in the Hanshin Daishoten on 19 March, 12th in the Tenno Sho (Spring) on 30 April, tenth in the Tancho Stakes on 3 September, and eighth in the Stayers Stakes on 2 December.

=== 2024: eight-year-old season ===
She began the season on 6 January in the Manyo Stakes at Kyoto, finishing third. She was withdrawn from the Hanshin Daishoten in March after a bone bruise in her right foreleg, and was excluded from the Tenno Sho (Spring) at the entry stage. On 4 May, she ran in the Metropolitan Stakes (Listed) at Tokyo, finishing seventh in what proved to be her final start.

Although her connections initially intended to continue racing in 2025, swelling in her right foreleg after training on 15 December revealed a recurrence of injury near the deep flexor tendon. Her retirement was announced on 18 December 2024, and her JRA registration was cancelled on 25 December 2024. She entered the broodmare herd at Okada Stud.

== Race record ==
The following table details all 36 starts of Melody Lane's racing career based on official JBIS and netkeiba records. Record current as of her final start on 4 May 2024.

Date	Distance (Condition)	Race	Class	Course	Odds (Favourite)	Field	Finish	Time	Jockey	Winning (Losing) Margin	Winner (2nd Place)	Ref
2018 – two-year-old season
Oct 13	Turf 1600 m (Good)	2-Y-O Newcomer	Maiden	Kyoto	351.7 (16th)	17	10th	1:36.1	Hayato Mitsuya	1.8	Urkraft	
Nov 4	Turf 1800 m (Good)	2-Y-O Maiden	Maiden	Kyoto	412.7 (15th)	15	13th	1:51.3	Hayato Mitsuya	1.3	Meisho Climb	
Nov 25	Turf 2000 m (Good)	2-Y-O Maiden	Maiden	Kyoto	330.1 (12th)	12	3rd	2:02.3	Hayato Mitsuya	0.6	Hiruno Dakar	
Dec 23	Turf 2000 m (Yielding)	2-Y-O Maiden	Maiden	Hanshin	70.2 (12th)	16	6th	2:04.4	Hayato Mitsuya	0.5	R Consensus	
2019 – three-year-old season
Mar 2	Turf 2000 m (Good)	3-Y-O Maiden	Maiden	Kokura	24.6 (6th)	18	10th	2:03.0	Yuji Tannai	1.5	Torroja	
Mar 24	Turf 2000 m (Good)	3-Y-O Maiden	Maiden	Chukyo	176.0 (11th)	16	13th	2:05.0	Manabu Sakai	1.6	New Ability	
Apr 13	Turf 2000 m (Good)	3-Y-O Maiden	Maiden	Hanshin	177.4 (11th)	16	7th	2:03.1	Manabu Sakai	1.2	Red Aurora	
Apr 29	Turf 2000 m (Good)	3-Y-O Maiden	Maiden	Kyoto	59.4 (9th)	14	6th	2:02.2	Hayato Mitsuya	1.0	Scar Face	
May 26	Turf 2400 m (Good)	3-Y-O Maiden	Maiden	Kyoto	63.3 (10th)	14	3rd	2:27.6	Arata Saito	0.6	Gotto Fleur	
Jun 15	Turf 2400 m (Yielding)	3-Y-O Maiden	Maiden	Hanshin	9.3 (5th)	13	1st	2:28.8	Mirai Iwata	–1.5	(Dandyism)	
Jul 13	Turf 2000 m (Yielding)	1-win class	1-win	Chukyo	7.8 (5th)	15	13th	2:02.2	Mirai Iwata	1.4	Tantalus	
Sep 28	Turf 2600 m (Good)	1-win class	1-win	Hanshin	4.6 (2nd)	10	1st	2:37.1	Mirai Iwata	–0.4	(Sadamu Laputa)	
Oct 20	Turf 3000 m (Good)	Kikuka Shō	GI	Kyoto	65.7 (12th)	18	5th	3:06.4	Ryusei Sakai	0.4	World Premiere	
Dec 21	Turf 2400 m (Good)	Esaka Special	2-win	Hanshin	3.1 (2nd)	11	4th	2:25.6	Mirai Iwata	0.1	Barack Palinka	
2020 – four-year-old season
Jan 19	Turf 2400 m (Good)	Nikkei Shinshun Hai	GII	Kyoto	8.4 (6th)	14	9th	2:27.9	Mirai Iwata	1.0	Mozu Bello	
Mar 22	Turf 3000 m (Good)	Hanshin Daishōten	GII	Hanshin	49.0 (10th)	10	5th	3:03.4	Mirai Iwata	0.4	You Can Smile	
May 3	Turf 3200 m (Good)	Tennō Shō (Spring)	GI	Kyoto	105.4 (13th)	14	11th	3:18.2	Mirai Iwata	1.7	Fierement	
Jul 5	Turf 2400 m (Yielding)	Hyogo Special	2-win	Hanshin	3.8 (3rd)	12	3rd	2:28.1	Kohei Matsuyama	2.1	Roll of Thunder	
2021 – five-year-old season
Jan 24	Turf 2600 m (Heavy)	Uminonakamichi Special	2-win	Kokura	5.2 (3rd)	11	1st	2:42.3	Kazuo Yokoyama	–0.2	(Admire Polaris)	
Feb 27	Turf 3200 m (Good)	Shorai Stakes	3-win	Hanshin	5.2 (3rd)	14	7th	3:16.1	Kazuo Yokoyama	1.2	Diastima	
Apr 11	Turf 2600 m (Good)	Osaka-Hamburg Cup	Open	Hanshin	6.5 (2nd)	14	10th	2:36.3	Manabu Sakai	1.2	Miss Mamma Mia	
May 2	Turf 3200 m (Good)	Tenno Sho (Spring)	GI	Hanshin	154.9 (16th)	17	11th	3:17.4	Kenichi Ikezoe	2.7	World Premiere	
Jun 12	Turf 2400 m (Good)	June Stakes	3-win	Tokyo	10.0 (5th)	11	10th	2:26.7	Keita Tosaki	2.1	Silver Sonic	
Jun 27	Turf 2200 m (Good)	Takarazuka Kinen	GI	Hanshin	153.9 (10th)	13	11th	2:12.8	Hideaki Miyuki	1.9	Chrono Genesis	
Oct 31	Turf 3000 m (Good)	Koto Stakes	3-win	Hanshin	5.3 (4th)	11	1st	3:07.2	Mirai Iwata	–0.1	(Taisei Monarch)	
Dec 26	Turf 2500 m (Good)	Arima Kinen	GI	Nakayama	146.8 (15th)	16	15th	2:35.2	Mirai Iwata	3.2	Efforia	
2022 – six-year-old season
Feb 19	Turf 3400 m (Good)	Diamond Stakes	GIII	Tokyo	15.4 (7th)	14	13th	3:32.2	Akira Sugawara	2.1	T O Royal	
May 1	Turf 3200 m (Yielding)	Tenno Sho (Spring)	GI	Hanshin	123.3 (16th)	18	9th	3:19.0	Mirai Iwata	2.8	Titleholder	
Jun 26	Turf 2200 m (Good)	Takarazuka Kinen	GI	Hanshin	210.3 (16th)	17	13th	2:12.0	Taisei Danno	2.3	Titleholder	
Dec 3	Turf 3600 m (Good)	Stayers Stakes	GII	Nakayama	50.2 (11th)	14	5th	3:46.8	Akira Sugawara	0.5	Silver Sonic	
2023 – seven-year-old season
Mar 19	Turf 3000 m (Good)	Hanshin Daishōten	GII	Hanshin	89.6 (8th)	14	11th	3:08.7	Seina Imamura	2.6	Justin Palace	
Apr 30	Turf 3200 m (Yielding)	Tenno Sho (Spring)	GI	Kyoto	243.0 (14th)	17	12th	3:18.0	Hideaki Miyuki	1.9	Justin Palace	
Sep 3	Turf 2600 m (Good)	Tancho Stakes	Open	Sapporo	7.4 (5th)	14	10th	2:44.2	Katsuma Sameshima	2.4	Jan Kazuma	
Dec 2	Turf 3600 m (Good)	Stayers Stakes	GII	Nakayama	59.5 (12th)	16	8th	3:46.7	Akira Sugawara	1.3	Iron Barows	
2024 – eight-year-old season
Jan 6	Turf 3000 m (Good)	Manyo Stakes	Open	Kyoto	23.5 (7th)	13	3rd	3:05.6	Hideaki Miyuki	0.3	Meisho Breguet	
May 4	Turf 2400 m (Good)	Metropolitan Stakes	Listed	Tokyo	24.3 (6th)	8	7th	2:25.6	Akira Sugawara	2.2	Battle Born	

== Broodmare career ==
Following her retirement, Melody Lane entered the broodmare herd at Okada Stud in Shinhidaka, Hokkaido. Her first foal, a filly by Benbatl, was born on 4 March 2026. She was reported in foal to Siskin for 2027.

f = filly

No.	Name	Foaled	Sex	Color	Sire	Races	Wins	Remarks
1st	(Melody Lane 2026)	2026	f	Chestnut	Benbatl			

== Pedigree ==
Pedigree of Melody Lane (JPN)
Sire Orfevre (JPN) 2008	Stay Gold (JPN); 1994	Sunday Silence (USA)	Halo
Sire Orfevre (JPN) 2008	Stay Gold (JPN); 1994	Sunday Silence (USA)	Wishing Well
Sire Orfevre (JPN) 2008	Stay Gold (JPN); 1994	Golden Sash (JPN)	Dictus
Sire Orfevre (JPN) 2008	Stay Gold (JPN); 1994	Golden Sash (JPN)	Dyna Sash
Sire Orfevre (JPN) 2008	Oriental Art (JPN); 1997	Mejiro McQueen (JPN)	Mejiro Titian
Sire Orfevre (JPN) 2008	Oriental Art (JPN); 1997	Mejiro McQueen (JPN)	Mejiro Aurora
Sire Orfevre (JPN) 2008	Oriental Art (JPN); 1997	Electro Art (JPN)	Northern Taste
Sire Orfevre (JPN) 2008	Oriental Art (JPN); 1997	Electro Art (JPN)	Grandma Stevens
Dam Mowen (GB) 2008	Motivator (GB); 2002	Montjeu (IRE)	Sadler's Wells
Dam Mowen (GB) 2008	Motivator (GB); 2002	Montjeu (IRE)	Floripedes
Dam Mowen (GB) 2008	Motivator (GB); 2002	Out West (GB)	Gone West
Dam Mowen (GB) 2008	Motivator (GB); 2002	Out West (GB)	Chellingoua
Dam Mowen (GB) 2008	Top Table (GB); 1989	Shirley Heights (GB)	Mill Reef
Dam Mowen (GB) 2008	Top Table (GB); 1989	Shirley Heights (GB)	Hardiemma
Dam Mowen (GB) 2008	Top Table (GB); 1989	Lora's Guest (USA)	Be My Guest
Dam Mowen (GB) 2008	Top Table (GB); 1989	Lora's Guest (USA)	Lora

- Melody Lane is inbred 5 × 5 × 5 to Northern Dancer and 5 × 4 to Northern Taste.
- Her dam Mowen won the 2013 Tancho Stakes.
- Her younger half-brother Titleholder won the 2021 Kikuka Shō, the 2022 Tenno Sho (Spring), and the 2022 Takarazuka Kinen.
- Her female family descends from the mare Lora, and includes Golden Horn and Cracksman.
