= 2022 Prix de l'Arc de Triomphe =

101st Prix de l'Arc de Triomphe
- Prix de l'Arc de Triomphe
- Location: Longchamp Racecourse
- Date: 2 October 2022
- Winning horse: Alpinista
- Jockey: Luke Morris

The 2022 Prix de l'Arc de Triomphe was a horse race held at Longchamp Racecourse on Sunday 2 October 2022. It was the 101st running of the Prix de l'Arc de Triomphe. The race was won by Kirsten Rausing's five-year-old mare Alpinista, trained in Britain by Sir Mark Prescott and ridden by Luke Morris. It was a first win in the race for the owner, trainer and jockey. Alpinista became the second five-year-old mare to win the Arc after Corrida in 1937.

This race was also the Prix de l'Arc de Triomphe with the most Japanese-trained horses as contestants, with a total of four horses contesting the title. However, none of them were even able to finish within the top 10.

== Full result ==
The below result is sourced from Racing Post, JRA-VAN, and netkeiba.

| Pos. | Draw | Time | Marg. | Horse | Age | Jockey | Trainer (Country) |
|---|---|---|---|---|---|---|---|
| 1 | 6 | 2:35:71 | | Alpinista | 5 | Luke Morris | Sir Mark Prescott (GB) |
| 2 | 2 | | 1/2 | Vadeni | 3 | Christophe Soumillon | Jean-Claude Rouget (FR) |
| 3 | 18 | | neck | Torquator Tasso | 5 | Frankie Dettori | Marcel Weiss (GER) |
| 4 | 4 | | 2 | Al Hakeem | 3 | Cristian Demuro | Jean-Claude Rouget (FR) |
| 5 | 9 | 2:36.5 | 1 1/2 | Grand Glory | 6 | Maxime Guyon | Gianluca Bietolini (FR) |
| 6 | 7 | | 3 | Westover | 3 | Rob Hornby | Ralph Beckett (GB) |
| 7 | 8 | | short neck | Luxembourg | 3 | Ryan Moore | Aidan O'Brien (IRE) |
| 8 | 14 | 2:37.2 | 1 | Broome | 6 | Wayne Lordan | Aidan O'Brien (IRE) |
| 9 | 12 | | head | Alenquer | 4 | Tom Marquand | William Haggas (GB) |
| 10 | 11 | 2:37.3 | 1/2 | Onesto | 3 | Stéphane Pasquier | Fabrice Chappet (FR) |
| 11 | 10 | | 4 | Titleholder | 4 | Kazuo Yokoyama | Tohru Kurita (JP) |
| 12 | 1 | | 1 | Mendocino | 4 | Rene Piechulek | Frau S Steinberg (GER) |
| 13 | 17 | | 4 | Mishriff | 5 | William Buick | John & Thady Gosden (GB) |
| 14 | 20 | | short neck | Stay Foolish | 7 | Christophe Lemaire | Yoshito Yahagi (JPN) |
| 15 | 19 | | 3 | Mare Australis | 5 | Bauyrzhan Murzabayev | André Fabre (IRE) |
| 16 | 15 | | 1 | Sealiway | 4 | Mickael Barzalona | Francis-Henri Graffard (FR) |
| 17 | 13 | | 2 | Bubble Gift | 4 | Olivier Peslier | Mikel Delzangles (FR) |
| 18 | 5 | | 12 | Deep Bond | 5 | Yuga Kawada | Ryuji Okubo (JPN) |
| 19 | 3 | | 6 | Do Deuce | 3 | Yutaka Take | Yasuo Tomomichi (JPN) |
| 20 | 16 | | 4 | Mostahdaf | 4 | Jim Crowley | John & Thady Gosden (GB) |

== Race details ==
- Sponsor: Qatar Racing and Equestrian Club
- Purse:€
- Going: Very Soft
- Distance: 2,400 metres
- Number of runners: 20
- Winner's time: 2:35.71
