= Melody Lane =

Melody Lane may refer to:

- Melody Lane (book series), series of books by Lilian Garis
- Melody Lane (1929 film), a lost black and white American musical film
- Melody Lane (1941 film), a 1941 American comedy film
- Melody Lane (horse), a Japanese-bred Thoroughbred racehorse
