= Takeshi Yokoyama =

Japanese jockey

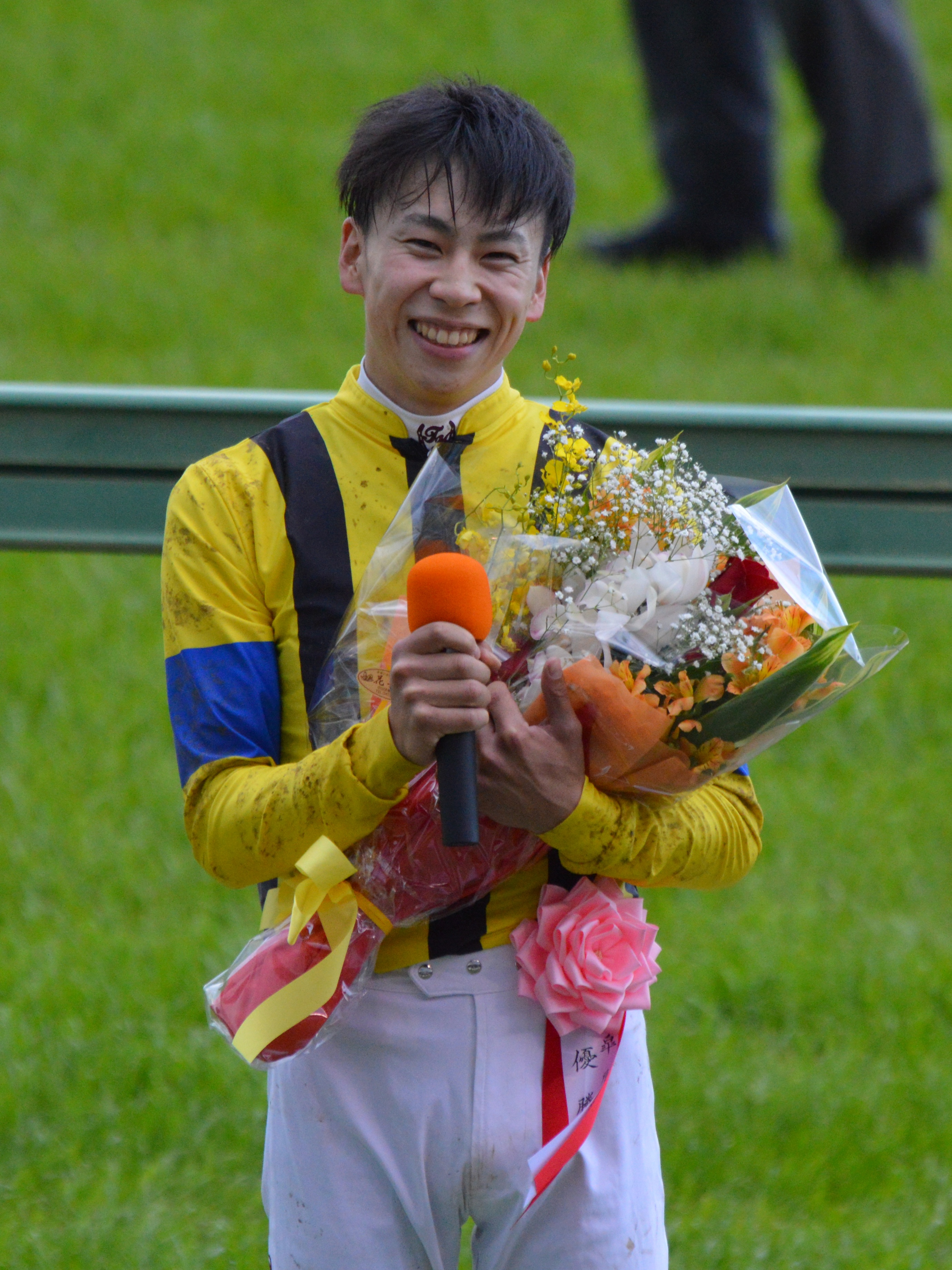
- Takeshi Yokoyama at the 2023 Satsuki Sho awards ceremony

Personal information
- Native name: 横山武史
- Nationality: Japanese
- Born: December 22, 1998 (age 27) Ibaraki Prefecture, Japan
- Occupation: Jockey
- Height: 165 cm (5 ft 5 in)
- Weight: 45.3 kg (100 lb)

Horse racing career
- Sport: Horse racing

Significant horses
- Efforia, Titleholder, Killer Ability, Sol Oriens

Takeshi Yokoyama (Japanese: 横山武史; born December 22, 1998) is a Japanese jockey.

Takeshi was born to a family heavily involved in horse racing. His grandfather Tomio, father Norihiro, and elder brother Kazuo, are all jockeys.

When he entered the Horse Racing School in 2014 to obtain his jockey license, he was one of the smallest in the school's history, with a height of 146.7cm and weight of 34.1kg at the time, to the point that one of his teacher (who also was his uncle, Yoshikazu) recalled that "some thought he should have waited an extra year before enrolling". He graduated from the school in 2017 and obtained his jockey license.

On April 26, 2020, Takeshi won his first graded race, the Flora Stakes with Win Marilyn.

On April 18, 2021, Takeshi won his first Grade I and classic race, the Satsuki Sho, with Efforia. This was the third case in JRA history for a father and son to win the Satsuki Sho after Kunihiko and Yutaka Take and Yoichi and Yuichi Fukunaga. Later that year, Takeshi won the Kikka Sho with Titleholder. He was, however, unable to win the 2nd leg of the Japanese Triple Crown, the Tokyo Yushun, when Takeshi's Efforia was beaten by a nose by Yuichi's Shahryar.

On October 31, 2021, Takeshi won the Tenno Sho (Autumn) with Efforia, becoming the third generation of his family to win the race. Later that year, Takeshi and Efforia also won the Arima Kinen, and also won the Hopeful Stakes with Killer Ability.

On April 16, 2023, Takeshi won the Satsuki Sho for a second time when he won the race with Sol Oriens.

== Major wins ==
- Arima Kinen - (1) - Efforia (2021)
- Hopeful Stakes - (1) - Killer Ability (2021)
- Kikka Sho - (1) - Titleholder (2021)
- Satsuki Sho - (2) - Efforia (2021), Sol Oriens (2023)
- Tenno Sho (Autumn) - (1) - Efforia (2021)
