= Efforia =

Japanese Thoroughbred racehorse

Efforia エフフォーリア
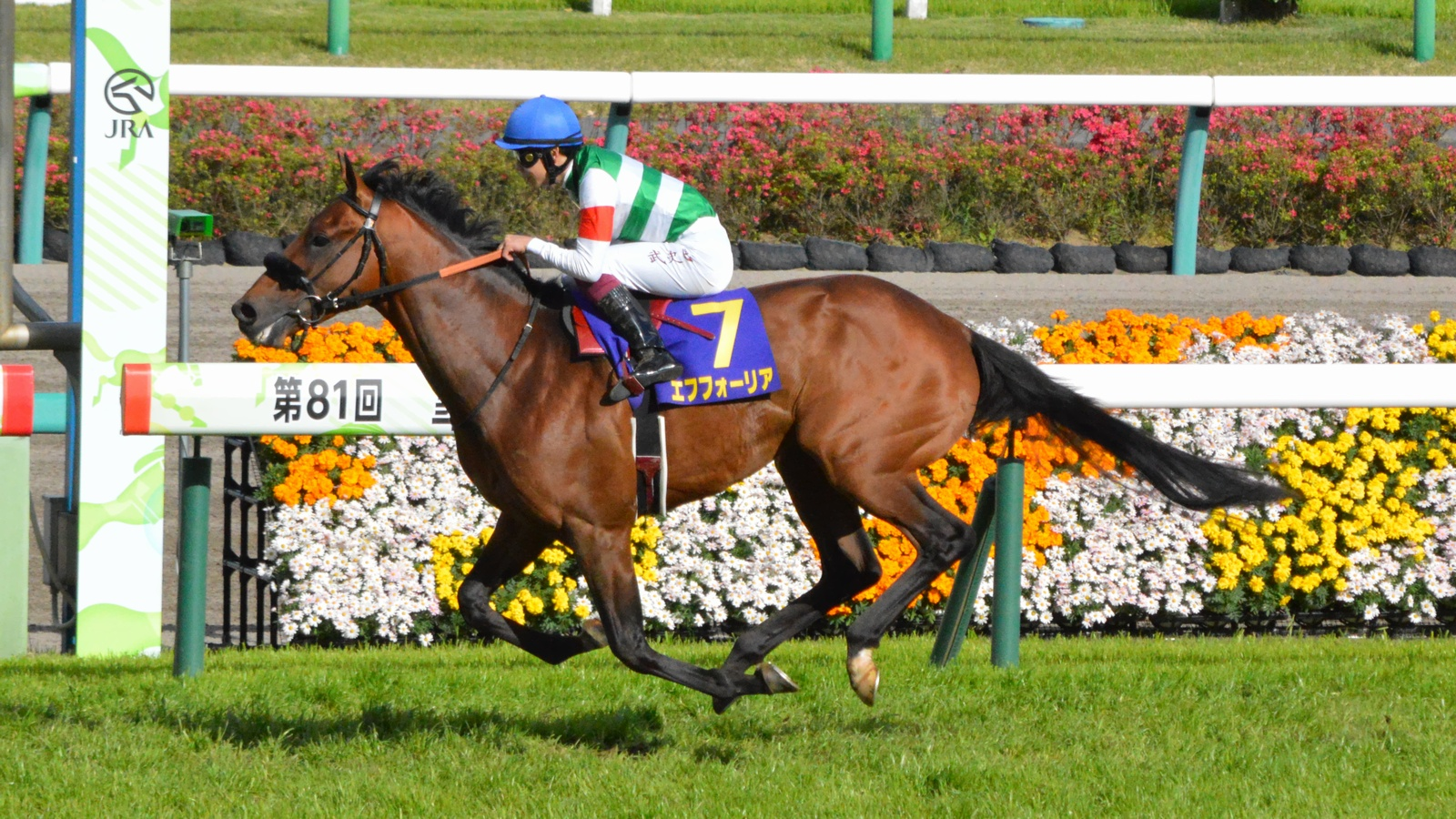
- Efforia winning the 2021 Satsuki Shō.
- Breed: Thoroughbred
- Sire: Epiphaneia
- Grandsire: Symboli Kris S
- Dam: Katies Heart
- Damsire: Heart's Cry
- Sex: Stallion
- Foaled: March 10, 2018 (age 8)
- Country: Japan
- Colour: Bay
- Breeder: Northern Farm
- Owner: U Carrot Farm
- Racing colours
- Trainer: Yūichi Shikato
- Jockey: Takeshi Yokoyama
- Record: 11: 6-1-0-3
- Earnings: ¥776,636,000

Major wins
- Kyodo Tsushin Hai (2021); Tenno Sho (Autumn) (2021); Arima Kinen (2021); Japanese Classic Race wins: Satsuki Sho (2021)

Awards
- Japanese Horse of the Year (2021); JRA Award for Best Three-Year-Old Colt (2021)

Honours
- Timeform rating: 127

Efforia (Japanese: エフフォーリア, Hepburn: Efufōria; foaled 10 March 2018) is a retired Japanese Thoroughbred racehorse and active breeding stallion. After winning two minor races as a two-year-old in 2020 he won the Kyodo Tsushin Hai on his first run of 2021 and maintained his unbeaten record by taking the Satsuki Sho on his next start. He was narrowly beaten in the Tokyo Yushun but returned in autumn to win the Tenno Sho and the Arima Kinen.

== Background ==
Efforia is a bay horse with a white sock on his left hind leg bred in Japan by Northern Farm. He was sent into training with Yuichi Shikato and raced in the green, white and red colours of the Northern Farm affiliate U Carrot Farm. He was ridden in all of his races by Takeshi Yokoyama.

He was from the second crop of foals sired by Epiphaneia who won the Kikuka Sho and the Japan Cup and was rated the second-best horse in the world in 2014. Efforia's dam Katies Heart showed some racing ability in Japan, winning three minor races on dirt from fifteen starts. She was a half-sister to the dam of Admire Moon and a grand-daughter of the Irish-bred mare Katies whose other descendants have included Sleepless Night (Sprinters Stakes) and Hishi Amazon (Hanshin Juvenile Fillies, Queen Elizabeth II Commemorative Cup). Katies Heart also foaled a full sister to Efforia, Jocelyn, who won the 2026 Kokura Himba Stakes.

== Racing career ==
=== 2020: two-year-old season ===
Efforia made his first appearance in a 2000 metre contest for previously unraced juveniles on firm ground at Sapporo Racecourse on 23 August 2020. Starting the 0.4/1 favourite in a seven-runner field he tracked the leaders before taking the lead in the straight and winning by three quarters of a length from Escobar. On 8 November over the same distance at Tokyo Racecourse he started second favourite behind Veil Nebula for a minor race and came from fourth place on the final turn to win by one and a quarter lengths.

Commenting on the colt's juvenile campaign, Yūichi Shikato said "physically and mentally he was a little weak, and his hindquarters weren’t so strong, so it took him a bit of time to recover from races."

=== 2021: three-year-old season ===
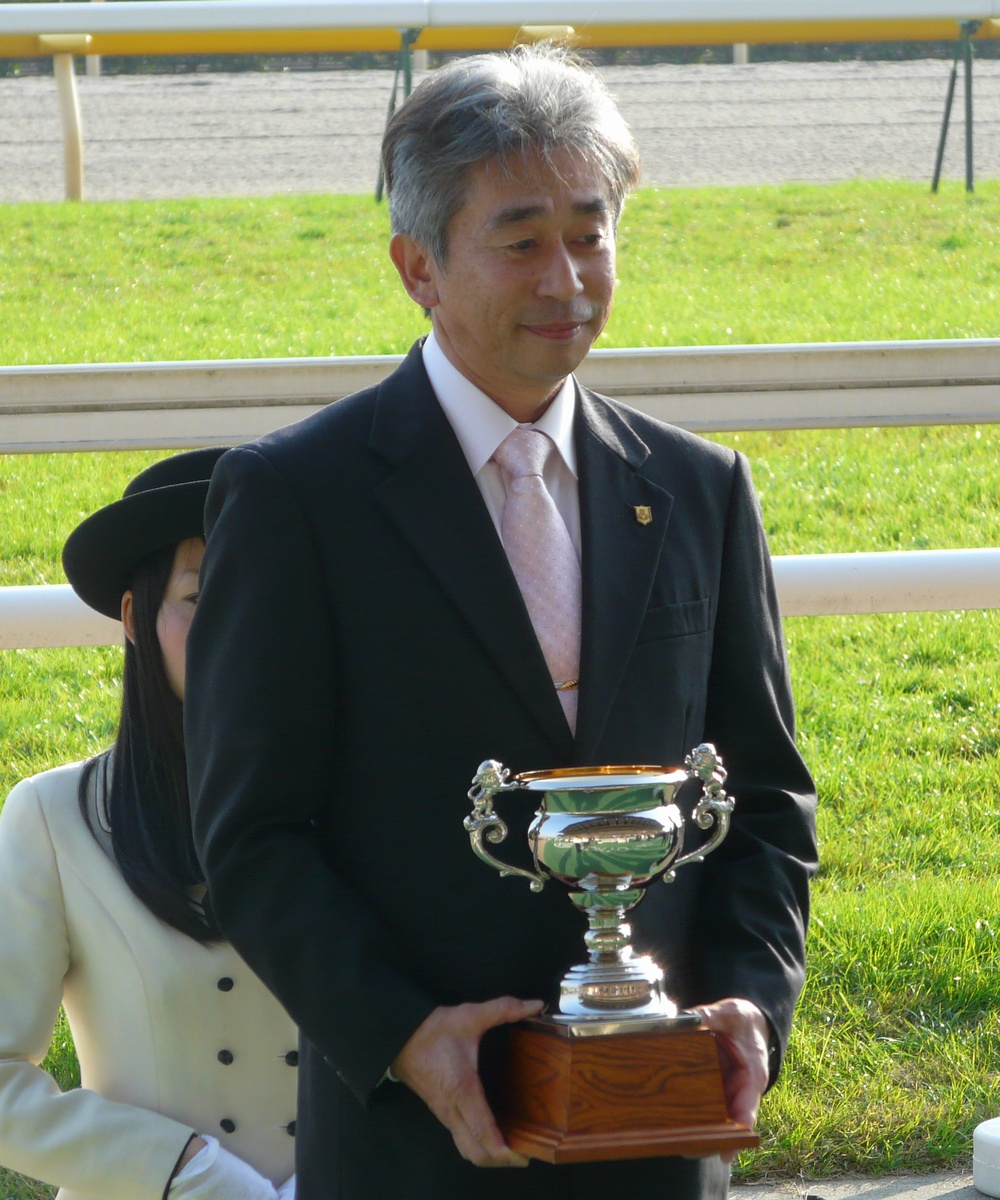
Efforia's trainer Yūichi Shikato

For his first run as a three-year-old, Efforia was stepped up in class to contest the Grade 3 Kyodo Tsushin Hai over 1800 metres at Tokyo on 14 February and started the 5.8/1 fourth choice in the betting behind Stella Veloce (winner of the Saudi Arabia Royal Cup), Shahryar and the filly Leftovers. After tracking the early leaders Efforia made strong progress early in the straight, went to the front approaching the last 200 metres and drew away to win by two and a half lengths from Victipharus. Yūichi Shikato commented: "He ran very smoothly... in what was a perfect race for him".

On 18 April Efforia moved up to Grade 1 class for the Satsuki Sho over 2000 metres at Nakayama Racecourse. He went off the 2.7/1 second favourite behind Danon The Kid in a sixteen-runner field which also included Victipharus, Lagom (Kisaragi Sho), Stella Veloce, Gratias (Keisei Stakes), Titleholder (Yayoi Sho) and Red Belle Aube (Daily Hai Nisai Stakes). Takeshi Yokoyama settled in fourth place as Titleholder and World Revival set the pace before making rapid progress to take the lead entering the straight. He quickly opened up a clear advantage and was never challenged, winning by three lengths from Titleholder. After the race Yokoyama said "I was fortunate to have been able to ride this colt since his debut.. I believed that if I put my concentration on using whatever skills I had as a rider and bring out the best performance from my horse, that we would have a great chance of winning. The pace wasn't that fast, so we were able to cruise along in a good position but we were a little tight going into the stretch and I could not be sure of my win until the end."

For his next race Efforia was stepped up in distance for the 88th running of the Tokyo Yushun over 2400 metres at Tokyo on 30 May and started the 0.7/1 favourite in a 17-runner field. After settling behind the leaders he moved up to take the lead 200 metres from the finish but was run down in the final strides by Shahryar and was beaten by a nose into second place. Shikato described the colt's first defeat as "very frustrating".

After an absence of six months, Efforia returned to the track for the autumn edition of the Tenno Sho over 2000 metres at Tokyo on 31 October, when he was matched against older horses for the first time. He was made the 2.4/1 third choice in the betting behind Contrail and Gran Alegria in an eighteen-runner field which also included World Premiere, Persian Knight (Mile Championship) and Curren Bouquetd'or. Efforia settled in sixth place as the outsider Kaiser Minoru set the pace, before moving up on the outside on the final term. He quickened well in the straight, gained the advantage from Gran Alegria 200 metres from the finish and held off a late challenge from Contrail to win by a length. After the race Yokoyama said "I cried with joy for the first time in my life, as I was very disappointed with the result of the Derby. He’s a good starter and a clever racer so I decided to believe in his ability and ride him without thinking too much.. I am grateful that we were able to win the race in front of many fans."

Efforia closed out his three-year-old season with a victory in the Grade 1 Arima Kinen, also known as Japan's "Grand Prix." With the most fan votes and sent off as the favorite in the 2500-metre event, Efforia moved forward from the middle of the pack to take the lead in the stretch, winning by three quarters of a length.

With four victories out of five starts in his 2021 campaign, including three Grade 1 wins and a Grade 1 placing, Efforia is selected as the Japanese Horse of the Year recipient of 2021.

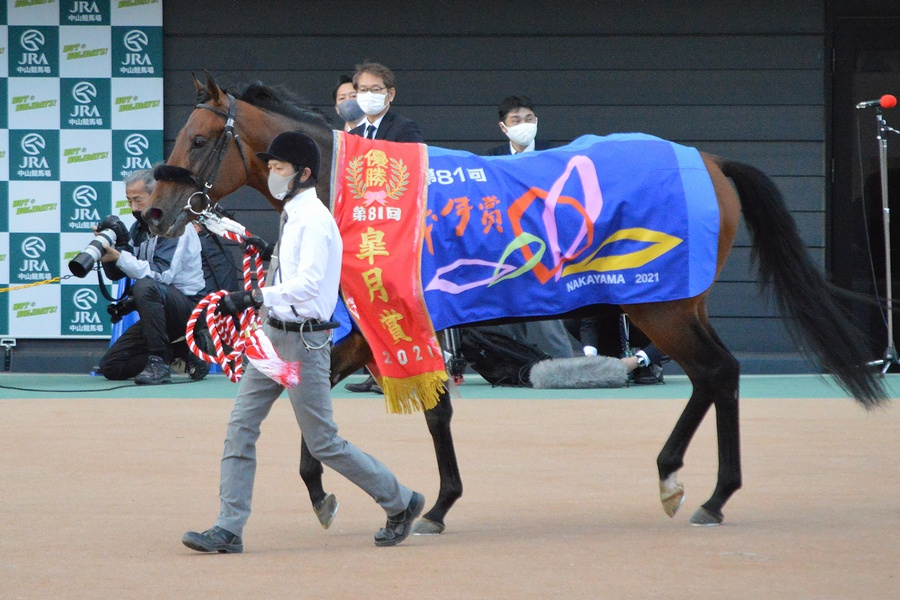
2021 Satsuki Sho

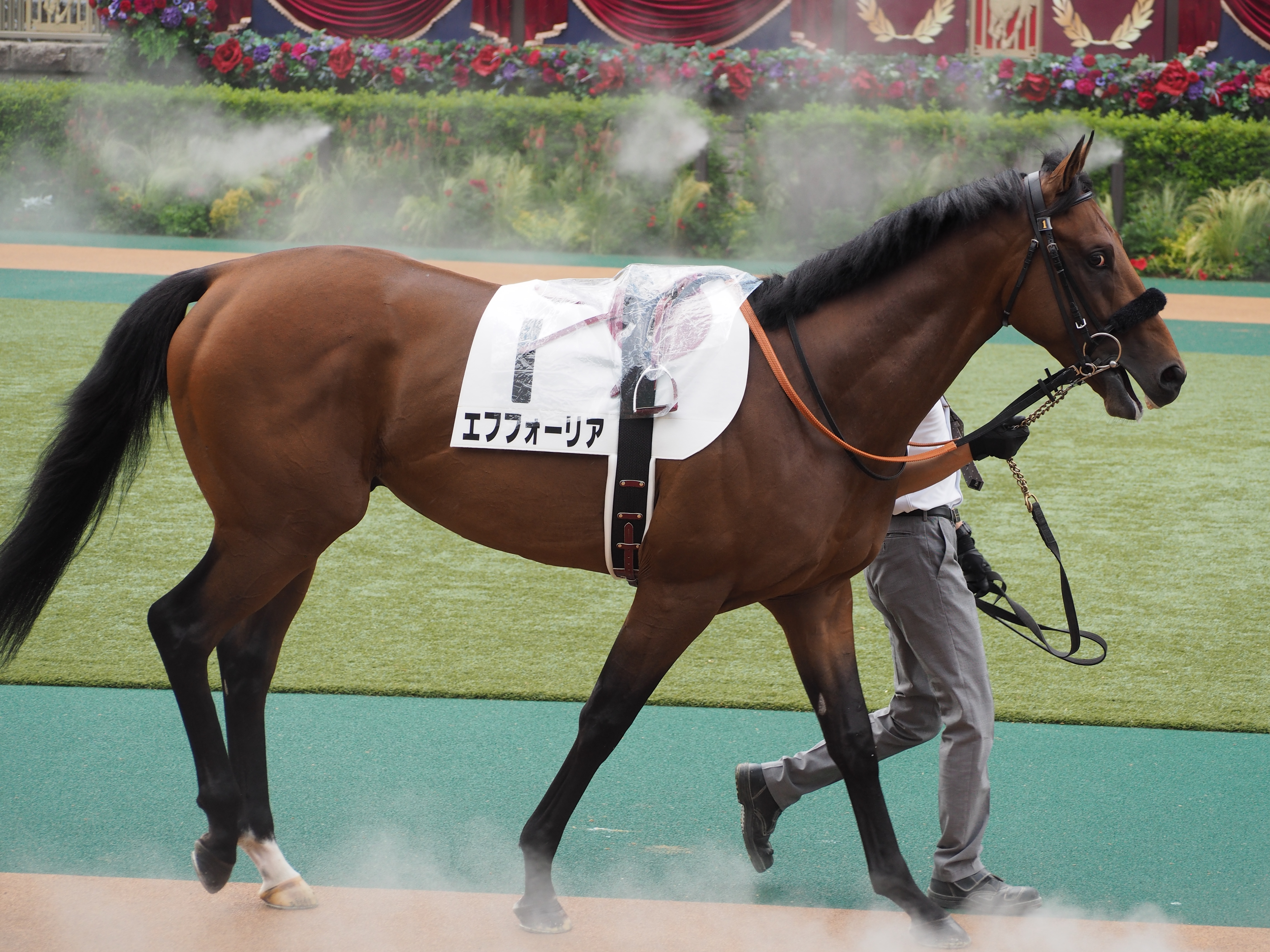
2021 Tokyo Yushun, at paddock

=== 2022-2023: four and five-year-old seasons ===
Efforia started his 2022 season with the Osaka Hai. However, he finished at 9th place behind Potager after he hit his head on the gate. He then went on to run in the Takarazuka Kinen as planned, with him being the most favored, but wound up losing behind Titleholder at 6th place. Efforia would go on to take a break for nearly 6 months before coming back to run in the Arima Kinen for the second time, of which he finished at 5th place behind Equinox.

Efforia would start his 2023 season with his first Grade-2 race in his career at the Kyoto Kinen, and was the second most favored behind Do Deuce. However, he was unable to finish the race as Efforia suffered atrial fibrillation. Two days after the race; Efforia's owner, Carrot Club, announced that the horse will be retired to stand stud at the Shadai Stallion Station.

== Stud record ==
After leaving Miho Training Center and passing through Northern Farm Tenei, Efforia arrived at Shadai Stallion Station shortly before noon on February 18, 2023. Upon his arrival, Eisuke Tokutake, manager of Shadai Stallion Station, described Efforia as "calm and full of energy". He further remarked, "He really is a fine horse. He has a well-balanced physique and a certain aura about him. He has some of the characteristics of his damsire, Heart's Cry, as well as the strength of his sire, Epiphaneia. His build seems to combine the best qualities of both." Yuya Takami, a stable manager at Northern Farm who had been responsible for Efforia during his early training, expressed his hope of winning another major race with one of Efforia's offspring.

Efforia's initial stud fee was set at ¥3 million. He attracted a large number of breeding applications, and he was fully booked shortly thereafter. He covered 198 mares during his first breeding season.

On June 7, 2026, Jodrell Bank became Efforia's first JRA-winning offspring after winning a two-year-old newcomer race at Tokyo Racecourse, achieving the milestone on the third JRA start by one of his progeny. On October 3 of the same year, Ippei won a two-year-old maiden race at Kyoto Racecourse, making Efforia the sire of winners at all ten JRA racecourses within four months of his first progeny victory. A week after, he sired his first graded stakes winner, Agordino, who won the Saudi Arabia Royal Cup.

=== Notable progeny ===
Below data is based on JBIS Stallion Reports.

c = colt, f = filly

bold = grade 1 stakes

**Foaled**	**Name**	**Sex**	**Major Wins**
2024	Agordino	c	Saudi Arabia Royal Cup

== In popular culture ==
An anthropomorphized version of Efforia appears as a character in the Japanese multimedia franchise Umamusume: Pretty Derby, voiced by Arisa Kori.

== Racing form ==
Below data is based on data available on JBIS Search and Netkeiba.com

Date	Age	Racecourse	Race	Grade	Distance (condition)	Entry	HN	Odds (Favored)	Finish	Time	Margins	Jockey	Winner (Runner-up)
Aug 23, 2020	2	Sapporo	2yo Newcomer		2,000 m (Firm)	7	6	1.4 (1)	1st	2:03.3	–0.1	Takeshi Yokoyama	(Escobar)
Nov 8, 2020	2	Tokyo	Hyakunichiso Tokubetsu	1Win	2,000 m (Firm)	8	6	3.5 (2)	1st	2:02.3	–0.2	Takeshi Yokoyama	(Rain from Heaven)
Feb 14, 2021	3	Tokyo	Kyodo Tsushin Hai	3	1,800 m (Firm)	12	7	6.8 (4)	1st	1:47.6	–0.4	Takeshi Yokoyama	(Victipharus)
Apr 18, 2021	3	Nakayama	Satsuki Sho	1	2,000 m (Good)	16	7	3.7 (2)	1st	2:00.6	–0.5	Takeshi Yokoyama	(Titleholder)
May 30, 2021	3	Tokyo	Tokyo Yushun	1	2,400 m (Firm)	17	1	1.7 (1)	2nd	2:22.5	0.0	Takeshi Yokoyama	Shahryar
Oct 31, 2021	3	Tokyo	Tenno Sho (Autumn)	1	2,000 m (Firm)	16	5	3.4 (3)	1st	1:57.9	–0.1	Takeshi Yokoyama	(Contrail)
Dec 26, 2021	3	Nakayama	Arima Kinen	1	2,500 m (Firm)	16	10	2.1 (1)	1st	2:32.0	–0.1	Takeshi Yokoyama	(Deep Bond)
Apr 3, 2022	4	Hanshin	Osaka Hai	1	2,000 m (Firm)	16	6	1.5 (1)	9th	1:59.1	0.7	Takeshi Yokoyama	Potager
Jun 26, 2022	4	Hanshin	Takarazuka Kinen	1	2,200 m (Firm)	17	4	3.3 (1)	6th	2:10.6	0.9	Takeshi Yokoyama	Titleholder
Dec 25, 2022	4	Nakayama	Arima Kinen	1	2,500 m (Firm)	16	7	10.1 (5)	5th	2:33.2	0.8	Takeshi Yokoyama	Equinox
Feb 12, 2023	5	Hanshin	Kyoto Kinen	2	2,200 m (Firm)	13	10	3.3 (2)	DNF	–	–	Takeshi Yokoyama	Do Deuce

== Pedigree ==
Pedigree of Efforia (JPN), bay horse, 2018
Sire Epiphaneia (JPN) 2010	Symboli Kris S (USA); 1999	Kris S	Roberto
Sire Epiphaneia (JPN) 2010	Symboli Kris S (USA); 1999	Kris S	Sharp Queen
Sire Epiphaneia (JPN) 2010	Symboli Kris S (USA); 1999	Tee Kay	Gold Meridian
Sire Epiphaneia (JPN) 2010	Symboli Kris S (USA); 1999	Tee Kay	Tri Argo
Sire Epiphaneia (JPN) 2010	Cesario (JPN); 2002	Special Week	Sunday Silence (USA)
Sire Epiphaneia (JPN) 2010	Cesario (JPN); 2002	Special Week	Campaign Girl
Sire Epiphaneia (JPN) 2010	Cesario (JPN); 2002	Kirov Premiere (GB)	Sadler's Wells (USA)
Sire Epiphaneia (JPN) 2010	Cesario (JPN); 2002	Kirov Premiere (GB)	Querida (IRE)
Dam Katies Heart (JPN) 2009	Heart's Cry (JPN); 2001	Sunday Silence (USA)	Halo
Dam Katies Heart (JPN) 2009	Heart's Cry (JPN); 2001	Sunday Silence (USA)	Wishing Well
Dam Katies Heart (JPN) 2009	Heart's Cry (JPN); 2001	Irish Dance	Tony Bin (IRE)
Dam Katies Heart (JPN) 2009	Heart's Cry (JPN); 2001	Irish Dance	Buper Dance (USA)
Dam Katies Heart (JPN) 2009	Katies First (USA); 1987	Kris (GB)	Sharpen Up
Dam Katies Heart (JPN) 2009	Katies First (USA); 1987	Kris (GB)	Doubly Sure
Dam Katies Heart (JPN) 2009	Katies First (USA); 1987	Katies (IRE)	Nonoalco (USA)
Dam Katies Heart (JPN) 2009	Katies First (USA); 1987	Katies (IRE)	Mortefontaine (FR) (Family: 7-f)

- Efforia was inbred 3 × 4 to Sunday Silence, meaning that this stallion appears in both the third and fourth generations of his pedigree.
