= Tomio Yokoyama =

Japanese jockey and training assistant (1940–2009)

Tomio Yokoyama 横山富雄
Personal information
- Nationality: Japanese
- Born: 25 February 1940 Toyoura, Hokkaido, Japan
- Died: 18 September 2009 (aged 69)
- Occupation: Jockey / Training assistant

Horse racing career
- Sport: Horse racing
- Career wins: 559 (JRA)

Significant horses
- Mejiro Musashi, Nitto Chidori, Five Hope, Mejiro Taiyo, Fujino O, Lindo Taiyo

Tomio Yokoyama (横山 富雄, Yokoyama Tomio) (February 25, 1940 – September 18, 2009) was a Japanese jockey and training assistant. He competed in the Japan Racing Association (JRA) from 1961 to 1983.

He recorded 559 JRA victories as a jockey, including the Tenno Sho (Autumn 1969, Spring 1971), the Takarazuka Kinen (1971), the Oka Sho (1973), and the Yushun Himba (1978).

He was the father of jockeys Kazuichi Yokoyama and Norihiro Yokoyama, and the grandfather of jockeys Kazuo Yokoyama, Takeshi Yokoyama, and Kazuki Kikuzawa.

== Early life ==
Tomio Yokoyama was born in Toyoura, Hokkaido, on February 25, 1940. His family operated a farm near Iihara Farm, which bred horses including Takao and Dainana Hoshu. In 1955, at the age of 15, he moved to Tokyo and entered the stable of trainer Kizo Konishi at Tokyo Racecourse. He attended the short-term training course at the Equine Research Institute and obtained his jockey license in March 1961.

== Riding career ==
Yokoyama made his debut on March 5, 1961, at Tokyo Racecourse, finishing ninth. He recorded his first victory on March 11 aboard Ushiwaka. In his first year, he recorded 10 wins across flat and jump races.

In 1963, he won the Nakayama Daishogai (Autumn) aboard Fujino O, his first stakes victory. He won the same race in the spring and autumn of 1964, and the spring of 1965, recording four total victories in the event aboard Fujino O. In 1968, he won the Nakayama Daishogai (Spring) aboard Fujino Homare, his fifth victory in the race. That year, he left the Konishi stable to become a freelance jockey, one of the first independent riders in the JRA alongside Masato Watanabe and Sadao Ono.

In 1969, Yokoyama won the Tenno Sho (Autumn) aboard Mejiro Taiyo. In 1971, he won the Tenno Sho (Spring) and the Takarazuka Kinen aboard Mejiro Musashi. In 1973, he rode Nitto Chidori to victories in the Oka Sho and the Victoria Cup. In 1978, he won the Yushun Himba aboard Five Hope. In 1979, he won the Asahi Hai Futurity Stakes aboard Lindo Taiyo.

In February 1975, Yokoyama was invited to compete in the International Invitation Cup at Happy Valley Racecourse in Hong Kong. He won the 1800-meter Jockeys Invitation Cup aboard Palinurus. In November 1975, he traveled to the United States to ride Tsukisamu Homare in the Washington, D.C. International Stakes, finishing ninth.

Yokoyama recorded his final victory on February 6, 1982, aboard Shadai Berry, and made his final race ride on February 21, 1982, finishing third aboard Okino Basho. He officially retired from riding in 1983.

== Post-riding career ==
Following his retirement as a jockey, Yokoyama worked as a training assistant in the stable of Minoru Sawa from 1985 until his retirement from the role in 2005. During his riding career, he required surgery and a blood transfusion following a fall. The transfusion resulted in a hepatitis infection. Yokoyama died from complications related to the illness on September 18, 2009, at the age of 69.

== Personal life ==
Yokoyama's wife was the sister of former JRA trainer Shinji Okudaira. His eldest son, Kazuichi Yokoyama, is a former jockey and current instructor at the JRA Horse Racing School. His second son, Norihiro Yokoyama, is a jockey. His grandsons, Kazuo Yokoyama, Takeshi Yokoyama, and Kazuki Kikuzawa, are jockeys. His son-in-law, Ryutoku Kikuzawa, is a former jockey and trainer.

== Major wins ==
=== As a jockey ===
Japan

- Asahi Hai Sansai Stakes - (1) - Lindo Taiyo (1979)
- Nakayama Daishogai - (5) - Fujino O (1963 Autumn, 1964 Spring, 1964 Autumn, 1965 Spring), Fujino Homare (1968 Spring)
- Oka Sho - (1) - Nitto Chidori (1973)
- Takarazuka Kinen - (1) - Mejiro Musashi (1971)
- Tenno Sho - (2) - Mejiro Taiyo (1969 Autumn), Mejiro Musashi (1971 Spring)
- Victoria Cup - (1) - Nitto Chidori (1973)
- Yushun Himba - (1) - Five Hope (1978)
