= Titleholder (horse) =

Japanese Thoroughbred racehorse

Titleholder タイトルホルダー
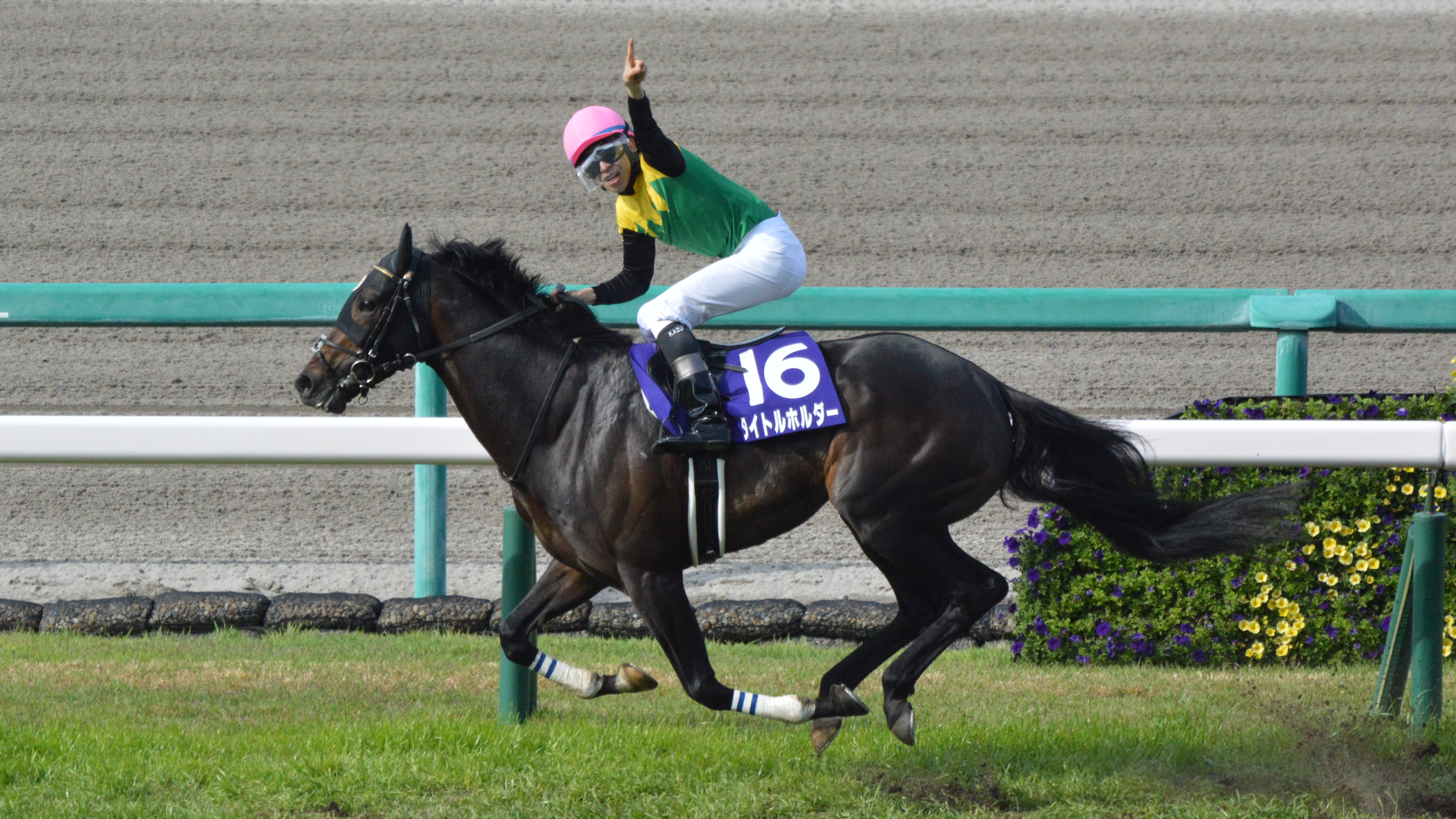
- Titleholder winning the 2022 Spring Tennō Shō.
- Breed: Thoroughbred
- Sire: Duramente
- Grandsire: King Kamehameha
- Dam: Mowen
- Damsire: Motivator
- Sex: Stallion
- Foaled: February 10, 2018 (age 8)
- Country: Japan
- Colour: Bay
- Breeder: Okada Stud
- Owner: Hiroshi Yamada
- Racing colours
- Trainer: Toru Kurita
- Jockey: Keita Tosaki; Takeshi Yokoyama; Hironobu Tanabe; Kazuo Yokoyama
- Record: 19: 7-3-1
- Earnings: ¥1,068,751,000

Major wins
- Yayoi Sho (2021); Nikkei Sho (2022, 2023); Tenno Sho (Spring) (2022); Takarazuka Kinen (2022); Japanese Classic Race wins: Kikuka Sho (2021)

Awards
- JRA Award for Best Older Male Horse (2022)

Honours
- Timeform rating: 129

Titleholder (Japanese: タイトルホルダー, Hepburn: Taitoruhorudā; foaled 10 February 2018) is a retired Japanese Thoroughbred racehorse and breeding stallion. He showed very promising form as a two-year-old in 2020 when he won his first start before finishing second in the Tokyo Sports Hai Nisai Stakes and fourth in the Hopeful Stakes. In the following spring he won the Yayoi Sho and ran second in the Satsuki Sho before returning in the autumn to record his biggest win in the Kikuka Sho. He improved again as a four-year-old when he added victories in the Nikkei Sho, Tenno Sho (Spring) and Takarazuka Kinen.

== Background ==
Titleholder is a bay horse with a white stripe bred in Japan by the Okada Stud. As a foal in 2018 he was consigned to the Select Sale and was bought for ¥21,600,000 by Hiroshi Yamada. The colt was sent into training with Toru Kurita.

He was from the first crop of foals sired by Duramente, who won the Satsuki Sho and the Tokyo Yushun and was named Best Three-Year-Old Colt in Japan for 2015. Titleholder's British-bred dam Mowen showed modest racing ability in Japan, winning five races from twenty-two starts, before going on to become a broodmare and foaling Titleholder's half sister Melody Lane by Orfevre, who holds the record of the lightest horse to win a JRA race. She was a great-granddaughter of Lora, who was the dam of On The House and the female-line ancestor of Golden Horn.

== Racing career ==
=== 2020: two-year-old season ===
Titleholder began his track career in a contest for previously unraced two-year-olds over 1800 metres on firm ground at Nakayama Racecourse on 4 October when he started the 1.3/1 favourite in a fourteen-runner field. Ridden by Keita Tosaki he led from the start and won by one and a quarter lengths from No Double Dip. On 23 November the colt was stepped up in class for the Grade 3 Tokyo Sports Hai Nisai Stakes over 1800 metres at Tokyo Racecourse. Starting a 15.6/1 outsider he settled in second place before moving up to dispute the lead in the straight but was overtaken by the favourite Danon The Kid and beaten one and a quarter lengths into second place. For his third and final run of the year Titleholder was stepped up in class and distance to contest the Grade 1 Hopeful Stakes over 2000 metres at Nakayama Racecourse on 26 December and went off at odds of 19.5/1. He raced in second place and briefly disputed the lead early in the straight but was outpaced in the closing stages and came home fourth behind Danon The Kid, Orthoclase and Yoho Lake."

In the official Japanese rankings Titleholder was rated the ninth-best two-year-old colt of 2020 in Japan, seven pounds behind Danon The Kid.

=== 2021: three-year-old season ===
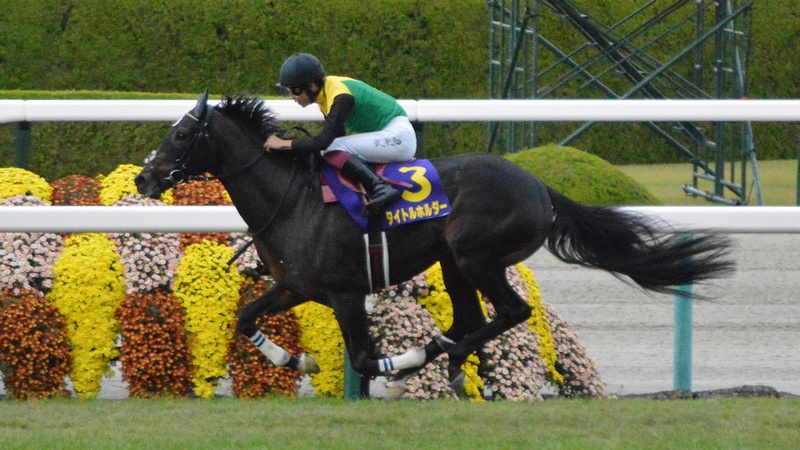
2021 Kikuka Sho

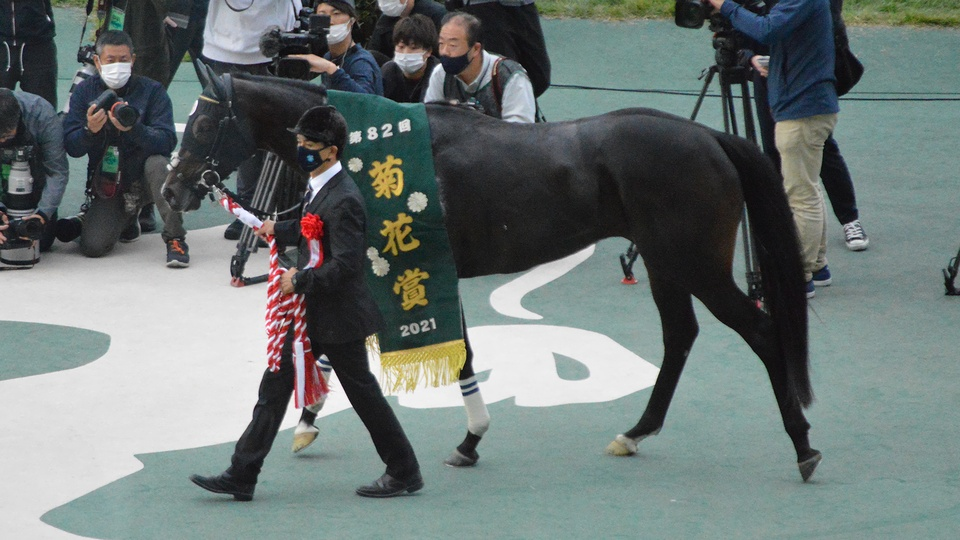
2021 Kikuka Sho, winner's circle

On 7 March at Nakayama, Titleholder began his second season in the Grade 2 Yayoi Sho (a major trial race for the Satsuki Sho) over 2000 metres and went off the 17.9/1 fourth choice in the betting behind Danon The Kid, Schnell Meister and One Day More. Ridden by Takeshi Yokoyama he led from the start and kept on well in the straight to win by one and a quarter lengths from Schnell Meister and Danon The Kid. Toru Kurita commented "It was a good win for him... he showed a lot of strength and some good footwork"

In the Satsuki Sho over the same course and distance on 18 April the colt started a 17/1 outsider in a sixteen-runner field. After racing in second place for most of the way he gained a narrow lead before gaining a slight advantage entering the straight and despite being overtaken by Efforia he "showed tremendous effort" to hold on for second place. When stepped up in distance for the Tokyo Yushun over 2400 metres at Tokyo on 30 May he tracked the leaders for most of the way before being outpaced in the closing stages and coming home sixth of the seventeen runners behind Shahryar, beaten three and a half lengths by the winner.

After the summer break Titleholder returned for the Grade 2 St Lite Kinen (a trial for the Kikuka Sho) over 2200 metres and started the 1.9/1 favourite. He was in contention until the straight but then faded badly and finished thirteenth of the fourteen runners in a race won by Asamano Itazura. In the Kikuka Sho over 3000 metres at Hanshin Racecourse on 24 October, the colt started the 7/1 fourth choice in the betting behind Red Genesis (Kyoto Shimbun Hai), Stella Veloce (Kobe Shimbun Hai) and Orthoclase while the other fourteen contenders included Asamano Itazura, Victipharus (Spring Stakes) and Weiss Meteor (Radio Nikkei Sho). Yokoyama rushed Titleholder to the front soon after the start, and the colt quickly opened up a clear advantage. Although his lead had diminished by the final turn, the colt drew away again in the straight and won by five lengths from Orthoclase. After the race Yokoyama said "We had a terrible race last time out so I was determined to win it this time and I’m glad it panned out... I concentrated in keeping him comfortable in a long race like this—he’s an honest horse, in a way too honest and always gives his full effort—so knowing that once in front he would settle, I let him go as he liked and didn’t try to hold him back too much. He has a lot to look forward to in the future but it would require a little skill as a rider to conserve his energy depending on the situations."

On his final run of the season Titleholder was matched against older horses in the Arima Kinen over 2500 metres at Nakayama. Ridden by Takeshi's elder brother, Kazuo, he started the 9.2/1 fourth choice in the betting, he raced in second place for most of the way before taking the lead in the straight but was overtaken in the last 100 metres and came home fifth behind Efforia.

=== 2022: four-year-old season ===
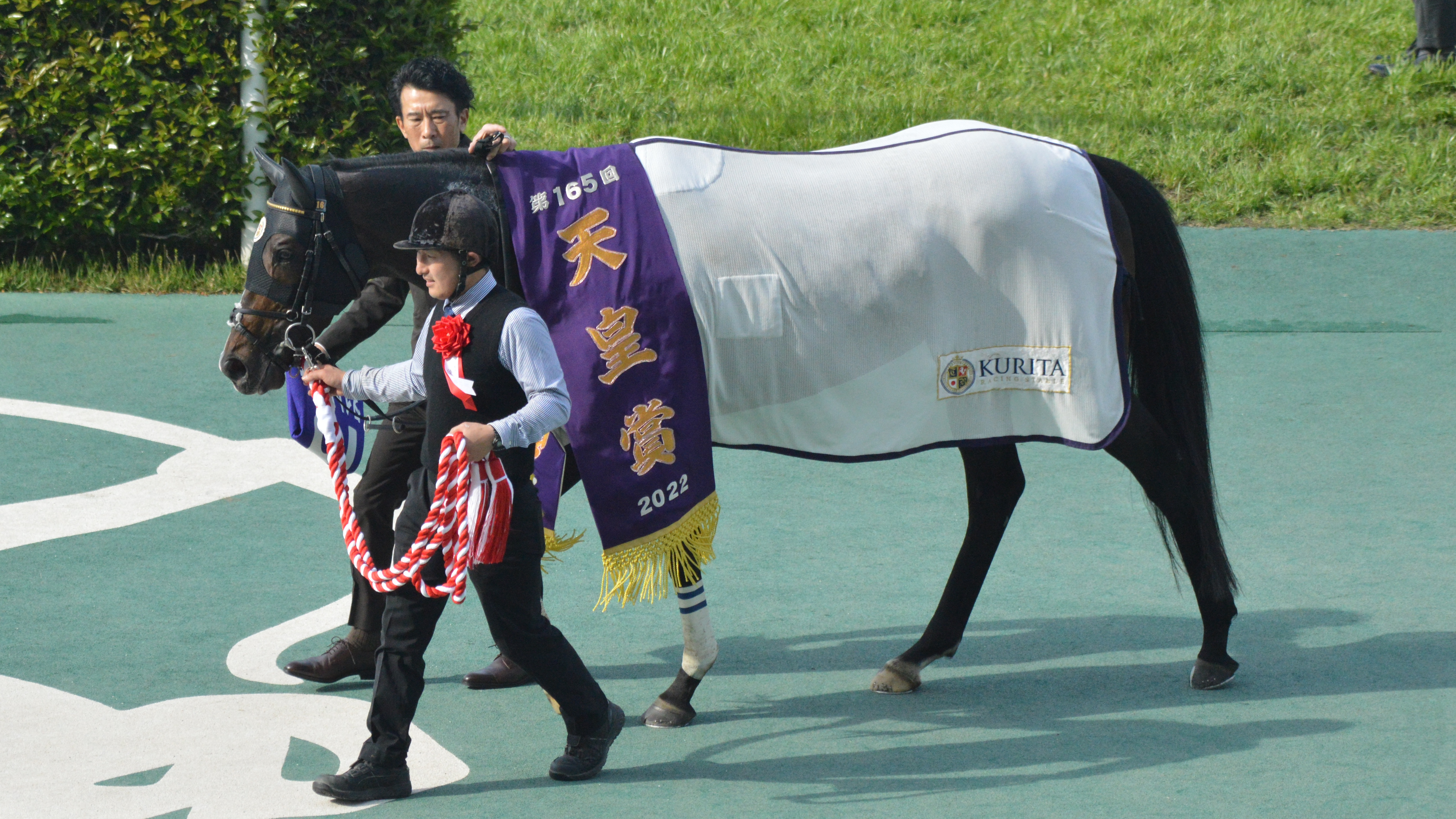
2022 Tenno Sho (Spring)

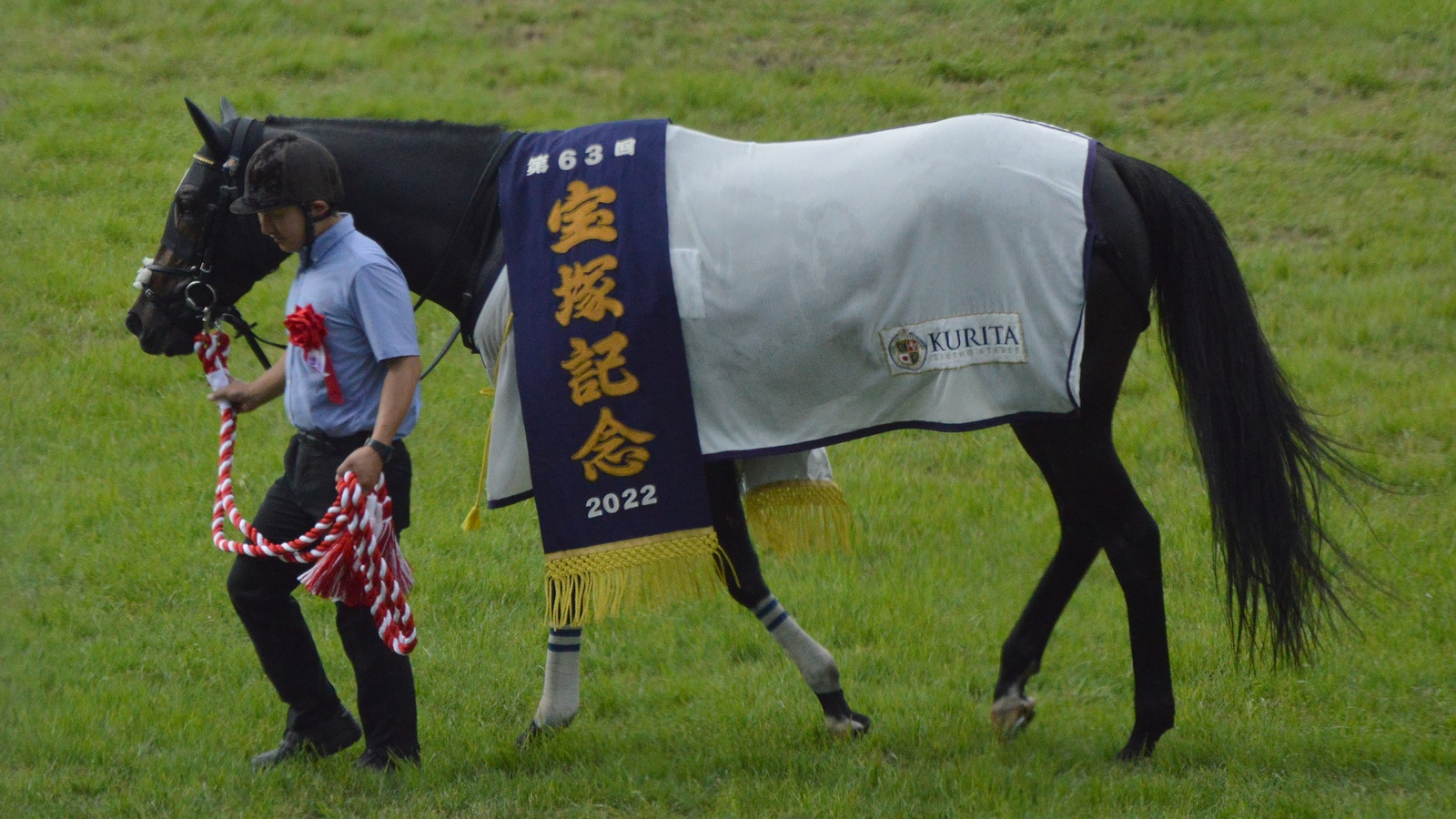
2022 Takarazuka Kinen

Titleholder began his third campaign in the Grade 2 Nikkei Sho over 2500 metres at Nakayama on 26 March when he was ridden by Kazuo Yokoyama and started odds-on favourite against fifteen opponents. He led from the start and repelled several challengers in the straight to win by a neck from the six-year-old Boccherini Toru Kurita later commented "I thought the others were going to catch him in the stretch, but he reached down and found some more and held his ground. I was reminded again of just how strong he is."

On 1 May at Hanshin Titleholder contested the Spring edition of the Tenno Sho over 3200 metres and started the 3.9/1 second favourite behind the five-year-old Deep Bond (Prix Foy, Hanshin Daishoten). The other sixteen runners included Hayayakko (Leopard Stakes), Crescendo Love (Tanabata Sho), You Can Smile (Hanshin Daishoten), Divine Force (Stayers Stakes), Meiner Fanrong (Niigata Kinen) and T O Royal (Diamond Stakes). Kazuo Yokoyama sent Titleholder into the lead from the start and opened up a big advantage before restraining the colt approaching the final turn. He then accelerated away from his opponents and won by seven lengths from Deep Bond. Yokoyama commented "I felt that he was in good form when I rode him in the post parade so I just believed in him and concentrated on riding him in good rhythm. We were able to slow down the pace in the backstretch to conserve his stamina and I was not worried about the horses behind us in the last stretch... I think he will get stronger and stronger."

Titleholder was then dropped back in distance for the 2200 metre Takarazuka Kinen at the same track on 26 June. With Kazuo Yokoyama he went off the 3.2/1 second favourite behind Efforia in an eighteen-runner field which also included Daring Tact, Panthalassa (Dubai Turf), Stay Foolish (Dubai Gold Cup), Deep Bond, Hishi Iguazu (Nakayama Kinen), Meiner Fanrong, Potager (Osaka Hai), King of Koji (American Jockey Club Cup), Gibeon (Kinko Sho) and Win Marilyn (Sankei Sho All Comers). Titleholder started quickly and disputed the early lead before settling in second place behind Panthalassa. He moved up to gain the advantage entering the straight, opened up a clear advantage and kept on well in the closing stages to win by two lengths from Hishi Iguazu, with a further two lengths back to Daring Tact in third place, setting a record time of 2:09.7. After the race Yokoyama said "I knew how the colt could run in good rhythm. The pace was fast but I wasn’t concerned because he still had enough power left at the straight. He’s still in the process of maturing and I think he’ll get better going forward,” while Kurita commented "I’ve been told by the owner that the colt will go to the Prix de l'Arc de Triomphe if he wins’ so we’re planning to send him straight to France."

Titleholder was, as previously announced, entered into the Prix de l'Arc de Triomphe on 2 October along with three other Japanese horses; Stay Foolish, Deep Bond, and Do Deuce. While Titleholder did the best out of the four Japanese horses, he still finished at a disappointing 11th place, after losing momentum at the final stretch when the winner Alpinista passed him.

After returning to Japan, he was entered in to the Arima Kinen, but likewise finished at 9th behind Equinox.

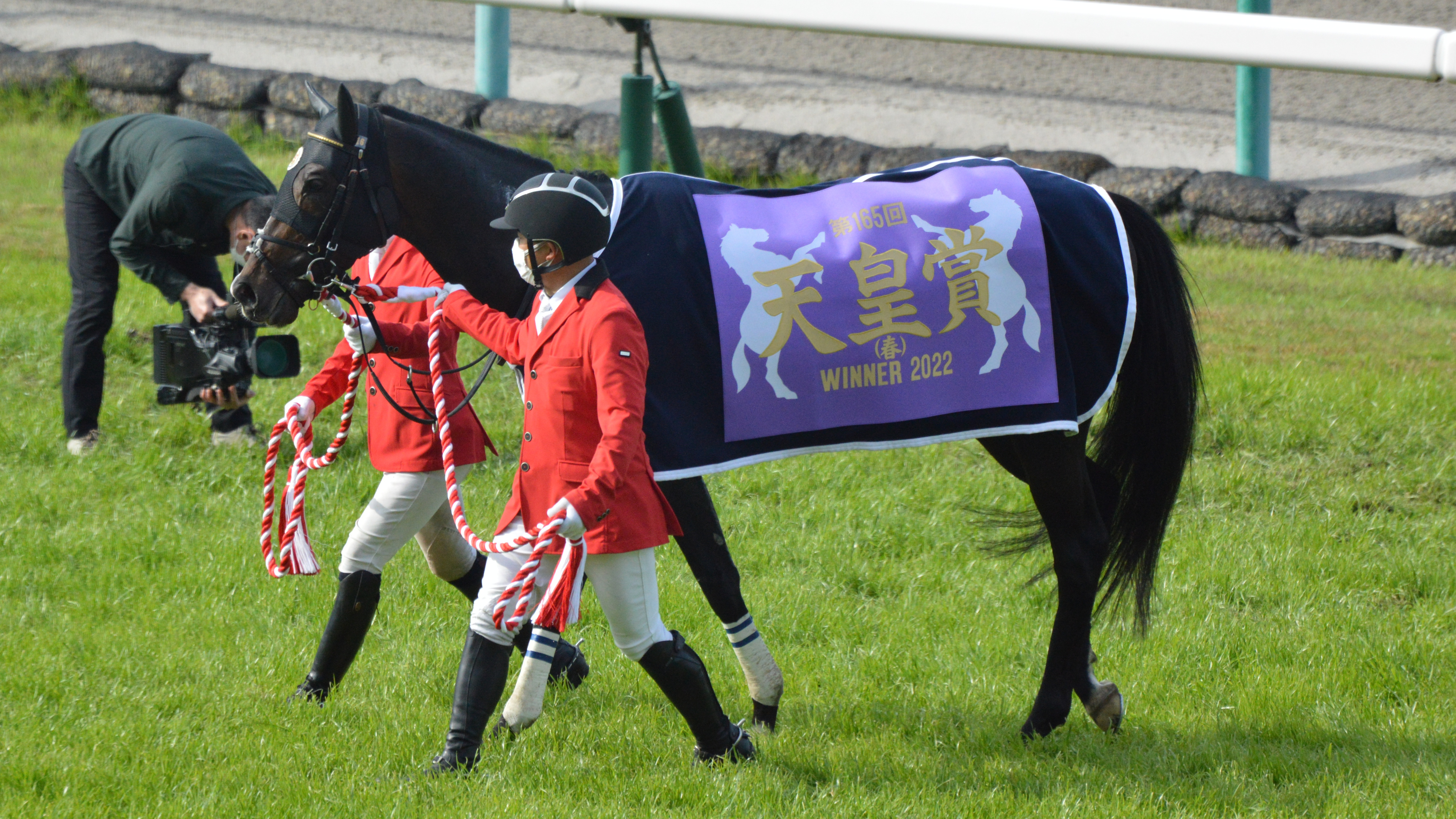

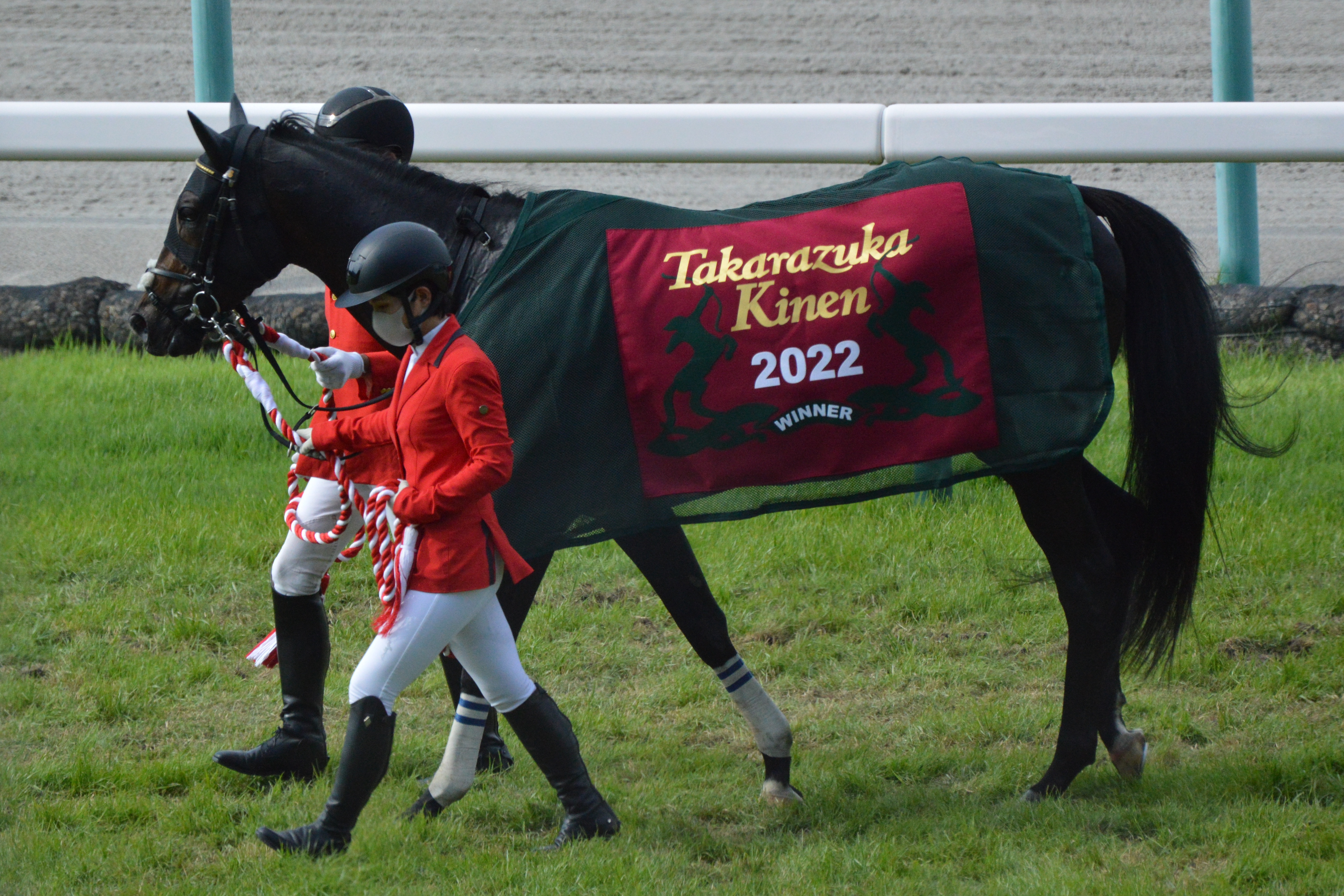

=== 2023: five-year-old season ===
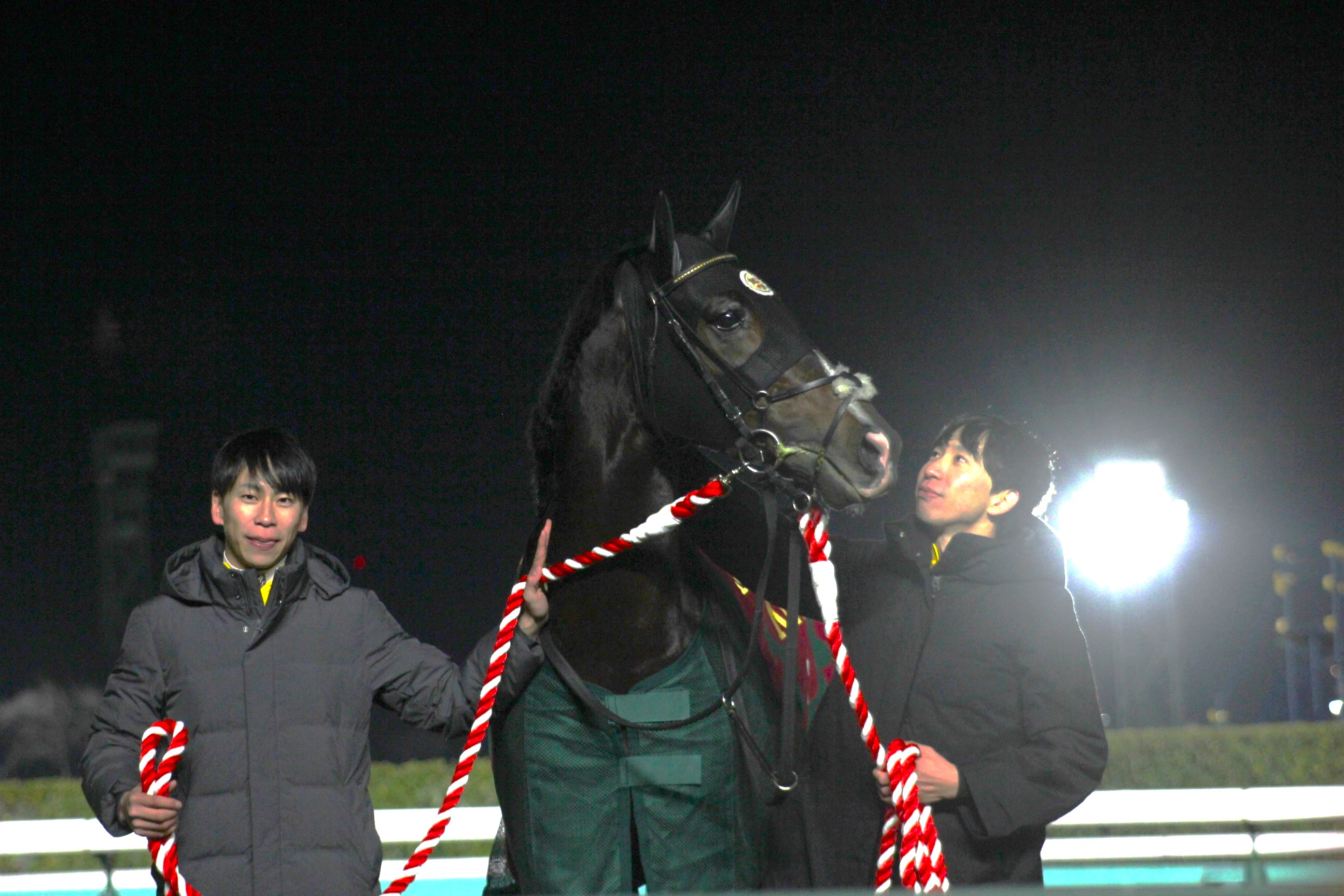
Titleholder and his jockeys, Takeshi (left) and Kazuo Yokoyama (right), at the retirement ceremony

Titleholder began the 2023 season by once again entering the Nikkei Sho. There he quickly took the lead after making a good start and widened the gap as the finishing line drew near, ultimately winning by an 8 length lead against Boccherini and earning his 6th graded race victory.

Titleholder was then entered into the Spring Tenno Sho in an attempt to win the race a second time. However, he lost momentum at around the third corner and did not finish the race. A post-race check revealed lameness on his right forearm. He was subsequently sent out to pasture to recuperate for the rest of spring and summer.

After returning to the races, he raced in the Sankei Sho All Comers, but finished second behind Rousham Park. He was then entered into the Japan Cup, where he ran a distant second for most of the race behind Panthalassa, before being passed by Equinox, Liberty Island, Stars on Earth, and Do Deuce, ultimately finishing at fifth place.

On December 6, Kurita announced that Titleholder would retire from racing after his next race, the Arima Kinen. During the race, Titleholder took the lead and kept it for most of the race, but was passed by Do Deuce and Stars on Earth at the final stretch, before finishing in third place.

After the Arima Kinen, a retirement ceremony was held for Titleholder. From the 2024 season, the horse was slated to stand stud at Lex Stud in Shinhidaka, Hokkaido.

== Racing statistics ==
Below data is based on data available on JBIS Search, and NetKeiba.com.

Date	Track	Race	Grade	Distance (Condition)	Entry	HN	Odds (Favored)	Finish	Time	Margins	Jockey	Winner (Runner-up)
2020 – two-year-old season
Oct 4	Nakayama	2yo Newcomer		1,800 m (Firm)	14	5	2.3 (1)	1st	1:51.4	−0.2	Keita Tosaki	(No Double Dip)
Nov 23	Tokyo	Tokyo Sports Hai Nisai Stakes	GIII	1,800 m (Firm)	10	2	16.6 (5)	2nd	1:47.7	0.2	Keita Tosaki	Danon The Kid
Dec 26	Nakayama	Hopeful Stakes	GI	2,000 m (Firm)	15	11	19.5 (7)	4th	2:03.3	0.5	Keita Tosaki	Danon The Kid
2021 – three-year-old season
Mar 7	Nakayama	Yayoi Sho	GII	2,000 m (Firm)	10	4	17.9 (4)	1st	2:02.0	−0.2	Takeshi Yokoyama	(Schnell Meister)
Apr 18	Nakayama	Satsuki Shō	GI	2,000 m (Good)	16	13	17.0 (8)	2nd	2:01.1	0.5	Hironobu Tanabe	Efforia
May 30	Tokyo	Tōkyō Yūshun	GI	2,400 m (Firm)	17	14	30.4 (8)	6th	2:23.1	0.6	Hironobu Tanabe	Shahryar
Sep 20	Nakayama	St Lite Kinen	GII	2,200 m (Firm)	14	7	2.9 (1)	13th	2:13.6	1.3	Takeshi Yokoyama	Asamano Itazura
Oct 24	Hanshin	Kikuka-shō	GI	3,000 m (Firm)	18	3	8.0 (4)	1st	3:04.6	−0.8	Takeshi Yokoyama	(Orthoclase)
Dec 26	Nakayama	Arima Kinen	GI	2,500 m (Firm)	16	6	10.2 (4)	5th	2:32.5	0.5	Kazuo Yokoyama	Efforia
2022 – four-year-old season
Mar 26	Nakayama	Nikkei Sho	GII	2,500 m (Good)	15	11	1.6 (1)	1st	2:35.4	−0.1	Kazuo Yokoyama	(Boccherini)
May 1	Hanshin	Tenno Sho (Spring)	GI	3,200 m (Good)	18	16	4.9 (2)	1st	3:16.2	−1.1	Kazuo Yokoyama	(Deep Bond)
Jun 26	Hanshin	Takarazuka Kinen	GI	2,200 m (Firm)	18	6	4.2 (2)	1st	R2:09.7	−0.3	Kazuo Yokoyama	(Hishi Iguazu)
Oct 2	Longchamp	Prix de l'Arc de Triomphe	GI	2,400 m (Yielding)	20	11	10.0 (5)	11th	2:38.12	2.4	Kazuo Yokoyama	Alpinista
Dec 25	Nakayama	Arima Kinen	GI	2,500 m (Firm)	16	13	3.6 (2)	9th	2:34.1	1.7	Kazuo Yokoyama	Equinox
2023 – five-year-old season
Mar 25	Nakayama	Nikkei Sho	GII	2,500 m (Soft)	12	2	2.4 (2)	1st	2:36.8	−1.3	Kazuo Yokoyama	(Boccherini)
Apr 30	Kyoto	Tenno Sho (Spring)	GI	3,200 m (Good)	17	3	1.7 (1)	DNF	--	--	Kazuo Yokoyama	Justin Palace
Sep 24	Nakayama	Sankei Sho All Comers	GII	2,200 m (Firm)	15	2	2.5 (1)	2nd	2:12.2	0.2	Kazuo Yokoyama	Rousham Park
Nov 26	Tokyo	Japan Cup	GI	2,400 m (Firm)	18	3	19.2 (4)	5th	2:23.1	1.3	Kazuo Yokoyama	Equinox
Dec 24	Nakayama	Arima Kinen	GI	2,500 m (Firm)	16	4	8.3 (6)	3rd	2:31.2	0.3	Kazuo Yokoyama	Do Deuce

Legend:

- Turf
- R on the time indicates that this was a record time

== In popular culture ==
An anthropomorphized version of Titleholder appears as a character in the Japanese multimedia franchise Umamusume: Pretty Derby, voiced by Yui Kanari. She is depicted as a serious and stoic former mixed martial arts competitor who was captivated by the running of a student at Tracen Academy, leading her to enroll as a student and become the strongest runner there is. Given her previous combat expertise, she tends to train in extreme environments, alluding to her real-life counterpart being raised in the Erimo Branch Farm in Shinhidaka, Hokkaido, known for its harsh natural conditions, similar to Daring Tact. The character was officially revealed on Day 2 at the 7th Umamusume Pretty Derby Event.

== Pedigree ==
Pedigree of Titleholder (JPN), bay colt, 2018
Sire Duramente (JPN) 2012	King Kamehameha (JPN); 2001	Kingmambo (USA)	Mr Prospector
Sire Duramente (JPN) 2012	King Kamehameha (JPN); 2001	Kingmambo (USA)	Miesque
Sire Duramente (JPN) 2012	King Kamehameha (JPN); 2001	Manfath (IRE)	Last Tycoon
Sire Duramente (JPN) 2012	King Kamehameha (JPN); 2001	Manfath (IRE)	Pilot Bird (GB)
Sire Duramente (JPN) 2012	Admire Groove (JPN); 2000	Sunday Silence (USA)	Halo
Sire Duramente (JPN) 2012	Admire Groove (JPN); 2000	Sunday Silence (USA)	Wishing Well
Sire Duramente (JPN) 2012	Admire Groove (JPN); 2000	Air Groove	Tony Bin (IRE)
Sire Duramente (JPN) 2012	Admire Groove (JPN); 2000	Air Groove	Dyna Carle
Dam Mowen (GB) 2008	Motivator (GB); 2002	Montjeu (IRE)	Sadler's Wells (USA)
Dam Mowen (GB) 2008	Motivator (GB); 2002	Montjeu (IRE)	Floripedes (FR)
Dam Mowen (GB) 2008	Motivator (GB); 2002	Out West (USA)	Gone West
Dam Mowen (GB) 2008	Motivator (GB); 2002	Out West (USA)	Chellingoua
Dam Mowen (GB) 2008	Top Table (GB); 1989	Shirley Heights	Mill Reef (USA)
Dam Mowen (GB) 2008	Top Table (GB); 1989	Shirley Heights	Hardiemma
Dam Mowen (GB) 2008	Top Table (GB); 1989	Lora's Guest (IRE)	Be My Guest (USA)
Dam Mowen (GB) 2008	Top Table (GB); 1989	Lora's Guest (IRE)	Lora (GB) (Family: 9-c)
