= Kazuo Yokoyama =

Japanese jockey

- Kazuo Yokoyama after winning the 2026 Negishi Stakes

Personal information
- Native name: 横山和生
- Nationality: Japanese
- Born: March 23, 1993 (age 33) Ibaraki Prefecture, Japan
- Occupation: Jockey
- Height: 167.2 cm (5 ft 6 in)
- Weight: 52 kg (115 lb)

Horse racing career
- Sport: Horse racing

Significant horses
- Titleholder, Ushba Tesoro, Bellagio Opera

Kazuo Yokoyama (Japanese: 横山和生; born March 23, 1993) is a Japanese jockey.

Kazuo was born into a family of horse racing, with his grandfather Tomio and father Norihiro being jockeys, as well as his younger brother Takeshi.

Kazuo earned his jockey license with the JRA following his graduation from the Horse Racing School in 2011, and raced against his father for the first time in a maiden race held at Nakayama Racecourse on March 5, 2011, where Norihiro finished 3rd and Kazuo 6th. Kazuo won his first race on April 30 with Laurel Cantata at Niigata Racecourse after 27 starts.

Kazuo won his first Grade I race in 2022 when he won the Tenno Sho (Spring) with Titleholder. This made him the third generation within the same family to have won the same race, with Tomio winning the race with Mejiro Musashi in 1971, and Norihiro winning the same race three times. That year, Kazuo also won, with Titleholder, the Takarazuka Kinen, which was another race won by both his grandfather and father.

== Major victories ==
- Kawasaki Kinen - (1) - Ushba Tesoro (2023)
- Osaka Hai - (2) - Bellagio Opera (2024, 2025)
- Takarazuka Kinen - (1) - Titleholder (2022)
- Tenno Sho (Spring) - (1) - Titleholder (2022)
- Tokyo Daishoten - (1) - Ushba Tesoro (2022)
