= Takarazuka Kinen =

Horse race in Japan

Takarazuka Kinen 宝塚記念
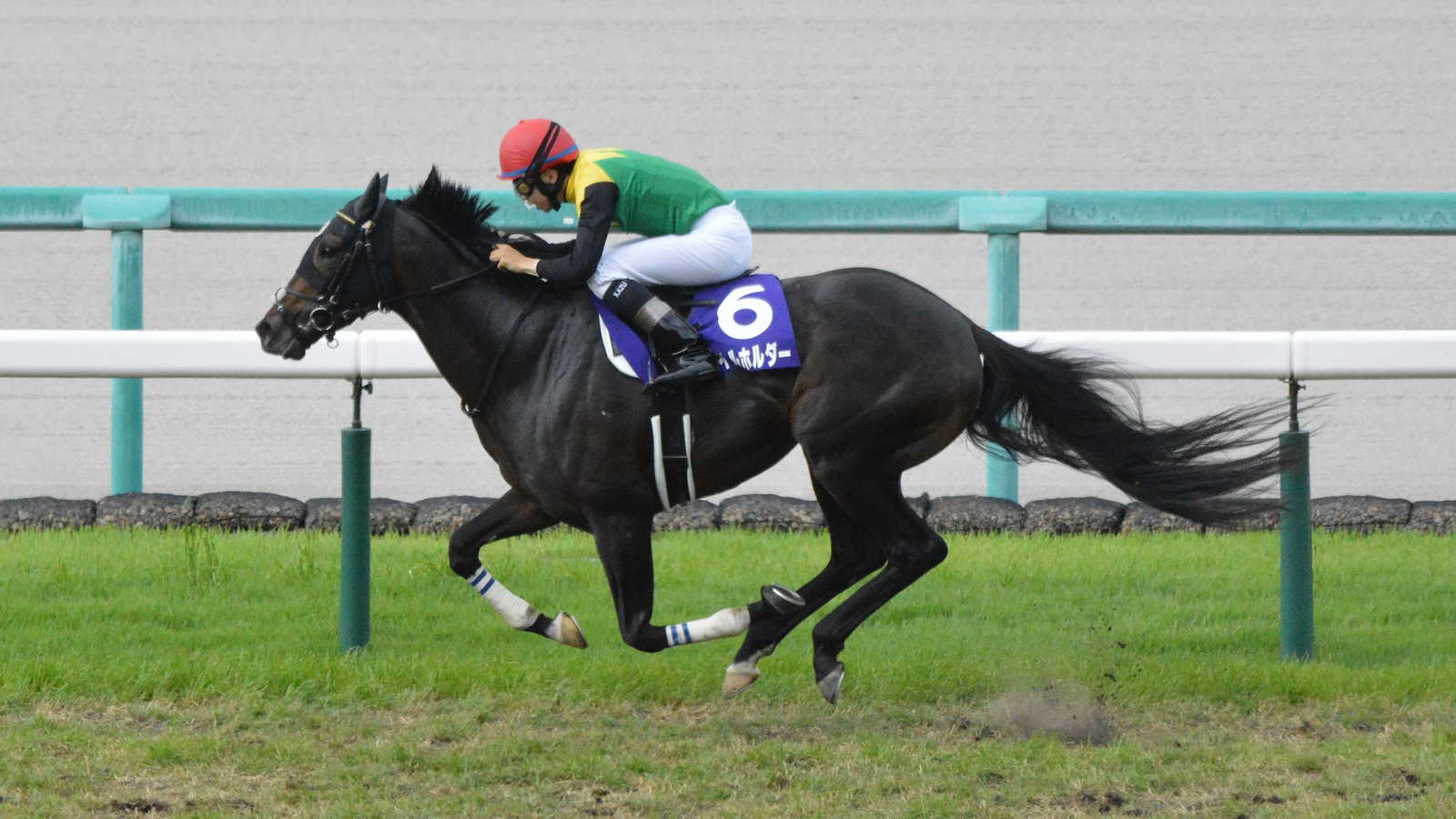
- 2022 Takarazuka Kinen winner Titleholder
- Class: Grade 1
- Location: Hanshin Racecourse, Takarazuka, Hyōgo, Japan
- Inaugurated: June 26, 1960
- Race type: Thoroughbred flat racing
- Website: japanracing.jp/

Race information
- Distance: 2,200 meters (About 11 furlongs / 1 3/8 miles)
- Surface: Turf
- Track: Right-handed (inner course)
- Qualification: 3-y-o & Up, Thoroughbreds
- Weight: 3-y-o 53 kg \ 4-y-o & up 58 kg Allowance : Fillies & Mares 2 kg
- Purse: ¥ 756,500,000 (as of 2027): 1st: ¥ 350,000,000; 2nd: ¥ 140,000,000; 3rd: ¥ 88,000,000
- Bonuses: Winner of the following in the same year: Ōsaka Hai, Tennō Shō (Spring), Takarazuka Kinen; Domestic: ¥ 300,000,000; International: ¥ 150,000,000; Winner of any three of the following in the same year: Ōsaka Hai, Tennō Shō (Spring/Autumn), Japan Cup, Takarazuka Kinen, Arima Kinen; Domestic: ¥ 200,000,000; International: ¥ 100,000,000

The Takarazuka Kinen (宝塚記念) is a Grade 1 (GI) flat horse race in Japan.

== Namesake ==
The race is named after the city of Takarazuka, Hyōgo, the location of Hanshin Racecourse, which is the venue of the race.

== Background ==
The Takarazuka Kinen is a Grade I turf Thoroughbred race in Japan open to horses aged three years and older. It is held annually in late June at Hanshin Racecourse over a distance of 2,200 meters on the inner turf course. The race is run under set-weight conditions: 53 kg for 3-year-olds, 58 kg for 4-year-olds and up, with fillies and mares receiving a 2 kg allowance. As with the Arima Kinen, the majority of the runners in the field are selected by a vote from racing fans, while the remainder are determined by the amount of prize money won. The winner receives a massive purse and earns automatic priority entry into international Breeders' Cup Challenge races.

== History ==
The Takarazuka Kinen was inaugurated on June 26, 1960, at Hanshin Racecourse over 1,800 meters on turf. It was established as a major summer championship to rival the spring and autumn Tenno Sho races. From 1961 to 1965 the race was run over 2,000 metres and since 1966 it has been run over its present distance of 2,200 meters.

The race was introduced as a fan-voted "All-Star" event, a format that remains a defining characteristic of the race today. Due to infrastructure projects and track renovations at Hanshin Racecourse, the venue has occasionally shifted. Notably, the race was held at Kyoto Racecourse in 1966, 1969, 1974, 1991, 1995, 2006, and 2024. In 2005, the race became an international event, allowing foreign-trained horses to compete.

Only 3 horses have won the race more than once, all three won it in two consecutive years:

- Gold Ship (2013, 2014)
- Chrono Genesis (2020, 2021)
- Meisho Tabaru (2025, 2026)

Gold Ship and Meisho Tabaru are also the only father-son pair to have won the same race twice in a row.

== Past winners ==
Year	Winner	Age	Length (in m)	Jockey	Trainer	Owner	Time
1960	Homare Hiro	4	T1800	Takeo Kondo	Sukehiko Take	Seishichi Niki	1:49.6
1961	Caesar	4	T2000	Shuji Ito	Katsukichi Ito	Yoshigoro Ito	2:04.6
1962	Kodama	5	T2000	Masaru Kurita	Bungo Takeda	Yoshigoro Ito	2:03.4
1963	Ryu Forel	4	T2000	Isao Miyamoto	Masaharu Hashimoto	Emiko Miyoshi	2:02.1
1964	Hikaru Pola	5	T2000	Shigetada Takahashi	Isamu Sato	Yohinosuke Tsubota	2:03.3
1965	Shinzan	4	T2000	Masaru Kurita	Bungo Takeda	Kokichi Hashimoto	2:06.3
1966 (Note: The race took place at Kyoto Racecourse)	Eight Crown	4	T2200	Shigeharu Naito	Yasuzo Taknaka	Noboru Yamaguchi	2:15.0
1967	Taiyo	4	T2200	Shigeharu Naito	Bungo Takeda	Hiroshi Naito	2:19.4
1968	Hikaru Takai	4	T2200	Yuji Nohira	Tomiyoshi Fujimoto	Yoshitatsu Nagayama	2:14.7
1969	Date Horai	4	T2200	Akihiko Uda	Senshi Hoshikawa	Date Bokujo	2:16.1
1970	Speed Symboli	7	T2200	Yuji Nohira	Shozo Nohira	Tomohiro Wada	2:13.3
1971	Mejiro Musashi	4	T2200	Tomio Yokoyama	Suekichi Okubo	Mejiro Farm	2:17.3
1972	Shofu Midori	6	T2200	Yoshito Matsumoto	Bungo Takeda	Ichisaburo Matsumoto	2:19.9
1973	Hamano Parade	4	T2200	Yoshiyasu Tajima	Masani Sakaguchi	Horse Tajima Co. Ltd.	2:12.7
1974	Haiseiko	4	T2200	Sueo Masuzawa	Katsutaro Suzuki	Horseman Club	2:12.9
1975	Naoki	6	T2200	Shoji Sasaki	Yasuzo Tanaka	Sakurayama Horse Co., Ltd.	2:16.7
1976	Fujino Parthia	5	T2200	Shoichi Osaki	Hiroshi Shibata	Shigeji Sanada	2:17.5
1977	Tosho Boy	4	T2200	Kunihiko Take	Takayoshi Yasuda	Tosho Sangyo	2:13.0
1978	Erimo George	6	T2200	Yoichi Fukunaga	Masaaki Okubo	Shinichi Yamamoto	2:14.2
1979	Sakura Shori	4	T2200	Futoshi Kojima	Katsutaro Sakai	Sakura Commerce Co., Ltd.	2:12.4
1980 (Note: The race took place at Chukyo Racecourse)	Teru Tenryu	4	T2400	Katsuichi Nishiura	Kenji Domon	Shigeko Ito	2:31.9
1981	Katsu R	5	T2200	Hiroshi Higuchi	Tsugio Yanagida	Hideo Kuribayashi	2:14.1
1982	Monte Prince	5	T2200	Masato Yoshinaga	Kichisaburo Matsuyama	Kihachi Mōri	2:12.6
1983	Hagino Kamui O	4	T2200	Kiyoaki Ito	Shuji Ito	Hirokichi Hinokuma	2:12.1
1984	Katsuragi Ace	4	T2200	Katsuichi Nishiura	Kazumi Domon	Ichizo Node	2:12.4
1985	Suzuka Koban	5	T2200	Yoshiyuki Muramoto	Minoru Kobayashi	Eiichi Nagai	2:15.9
1986	Persian Boy	4	T2200	Masato Shibata	Kunio Takamatsu	Hidekazu Date	2:14.4
1987	Suzu Parade	6	T2200	Seiji Ebisawa	Rokuro Tomita	Yoshio Koshiki	2:12.3
1988	Tamamo Cross	4	T2200	Katsumi Minai	Isami Obara	Tamamo Stable	2:13.2
1989	Inari One	5	T2200	Yutaka Take	Kiyoshi Suzuki	Hiroki Hotehama	2:14.0
1990	Osaichi George	4	T2200	Katsuhide Maruyama	Kazumi Domon	Choichi Node	2:14.0
1991	Mejiro Ryan	4	T2200	Norihiro Yokoyama	Shinji Okuhira	Mejiro Farm	2:13.6
1992	Mejiro Palmer	5	T2200	Taisei Yamada	Masaaki Okubo	Mejiro Farm	2:18.6
1993	Mejiro McQueen	6	T2200	Yutaka Take	Yasuo Ikee	Mejiro Farm	2:17.7
1994	Biwa Hayahide	4	T2200	Yukio Okabe	Mitsumasa Hamada	Biwa Co Ltd	2:11.2
1995	Dantsu Seattle	5	T2200	Yoshiyuki Muramoto	Kenji Yamauchi	Tetsuji Yamamoto	2:10.2
1996	Mayano Top Gun	4	T2200	Seiki Tabara	Masahiro Sakaguchi	Yuu Tadokoro	2:12.0
1997	Marvelous Sunday	5	T2200	Yutaka Take	Makoto Osawa	Sadao Sasahara	2:11.9
1998	Silence Suzuka	4	T2200	Katsumi Minai	Mitsuru Hashida	Keiji Nagai	2:11.9
1999	Grass Wonder	4	T2200	Hitoshi Matoba	Mitsuhiro Ogata	Y. Hanzawa	2:12.1
2000	T M Opera O	4	T2200	Ryuji Wada	Ichizo Iwamoto	Masatsugu Takezono	2:13.8
2001	Meisho Doto	5	T2200	Yasuhiko Yasuda	Isao Yasuda	Yoshio Matsumoto	2:11.7
2002	Dantsu Flame	4	T2200	Shinji Fujita	Kenji Yamauchi	Tetsuji Yamamoto	2:12.9
2003	Hishi Miracle	4	T2200	Koichi Tsunoda	Masaru Sayama	Masaichiro Abe	2:12.0
2004	Tap Dance City	7	T2200	Tetsuzo Sato	Shozo Sasaki	Yushun Horse Club	2:11.1
2005	Sweep Tosho	4	T2200	Kenichi Ikezoe	Akio Tsurudome	Tosho Sangyo	2:11.5
2006	Deep Impact	4	T2200	Yutaka Take	Yasuo Ikee	Kaneko Makoto Holdings	2:13.0
2007	Admire Moon	4	T2200	Yasunari Iwata	Hiroyoshi Matsuda	Riichi Kondo	2:12.4
2008	Eishin Deputy	6	T2200	Hiroyuki Uchida	Akira Nomoto	Toyomitsu Hirai	2:15.3
2009	Dream Journey	5	T2200	Kenichi Ikezoe	Yasutoshi Ikee	Sunday Racing	2:11.3
2010	Nakayama Festa	4	T2200	Yoshitomi Shibata	Yoshitaka Ninomiya	Shinichi Izumi	2:13.0
2011	Earnestly	6	T2200	Tetsuzo Sato	Shozo Sasaki	Koji Maeda	2:10.1
2012	Orfevre	4	T2200	Kenichi Ikezoe	Yasutoshi Ikee	Sunday Racing	2:10.9
2013	Gold Ship	4	T2200	Hiroyuki Uchida	Naosuke Sugai	Eiichi Kobayashi	2:13.2
2014	Gold Ship	5	T2200	Norihiro Yokoyama	Naosuke Sugai	Eiichi Kobayashi	2:13.9
2015	Lovely Day	5	T2200	Yuga Kawada	Yasutoshi Ikee	Kaneko Makoto Holdings	2:14.4
2016	Marialite	5	T2200	Masayoshi Ebina	Takashi Kubota	U.Carrot Farm	2:12.8
2017	Satono Crown	5	T2200	Mirco Demuro	Noriyuki Hori	Hajime Satomi	2:11.4
2018	Mikki Rocket	5	T2200	Ryuji Wada	Hidetaka Otonashi	Mizuki Noda	2:11.6
2019	Lys Gracieux	5	T2200	Damian Lane	Yoshito Yahagi	U Carrot Farm	2:10.8
2020	Chrono Genesis	4	T2200	Yuichi Kitamura	Takashi Saito	Sunday Racing	2:13.5
2021	Chrono Genesis	5	T2200	Christophe Lemaire	Takashi Saito	Sunday Racing	2:10.9
2022	Titleholder	4	T2200	Kazuo Yokoyama	Toru Kurita	Hiroshi Yamada	2:09.7
2023	Equinox	4	T2200	Christophe Lemaire	Tetsuya Kimura	Silk Racing Co., Ltd.	2:11.2
2024	Blow the Horn	5	T2200	Akira Sugawara	Tatsuya Yoshioka	Makio Okada	2:12.0
2025	Meisho Tabaru	4	T2200	Yutaka Take	Mamoru Ishibashi	Yoshio Matsumoto	2:11.1
2026	Meisho Tabaru	5	T2200	Yutaka Take	Mamoru Ishibashi	Yoshitaka Matsumoto	2:12.1

== Vote leaders since 2004 ==
Year	Leader	Age	Votes Received	Race Result
2004	Lincoln	4	60,865	3rd
2005	Zenno Rob Roy	5	67,667	3rd
2006	Deep Impact	4	89,864	Winner
2007	Meisho Samson	4	76,932	2nd
2008	Vodka	4	75,594	Not in race
2009	Vodka	5	139,507	Not in race
2010	Buena Vista	4	92,024	2nd
2011	Buena Vista	5	97,429	2nd
2012	Orfevre	4	72,253	Winner
2013	Orfevre	5	70,519	Not in race
2014	Gold Ship	5	51,366	Winner
2015	Gold Ship	6	66,123	15th
2016	Kitasan Black	4	82,121	3rd
2017	Kitasan Black	5	101,621	9th
2018	Satono Diamond	5	63,599	6th
2019	Almond Eye	4	78,778	Not in race
2020	Almond Eye	5	111,842	Not in race
2021	Chrono Genesis	5	137,448	Winner
2022	Titleholder	4	191,394	Winner
2023	Equinox	4	216,379	Winner
2024	Do Deuce	5	238,367	6th
2025	Bellagio Opera	5	228,950	2nd
2026	Croix du Nord	4	366,039	2nd

== See also ==
- Horse racing in Japan
- List of Japanese flat horse races

=== Netkeiba ===
- 1960 en, 1961 en, 1962 en, 1963 en, 1964 en, 1965 en, 1966 en, 1967 en, 1968 en, 1969 en, 1970 en, 1971 en, 1972 en, 1973 en, 1974 en, 1975 en, 1976 en, 1977 en, 1978 en, 1979 en, 1980 en, 1981 en, 1982 en, 1983 en, 1984 en, 1985 en, 1986 en, 1987 en, 1988 en, 1989 en, 1990 en, 1991 en, 1992 en, 1993 en, 1994 en, 1995 en, 1996 en, 1997 en, 1998 en, 1999 en, 2000 en, 2001 en, 2002 en, 2003 en, 2004 en, 2005 en, 2006 en, 2007 en, 2008 en, 2009 en, 2010 en, 2011 en, 2012 en, 2013 en, 2014 en, 2015 en, 2016 en, 2017 en, 2018 en, 2019 en, 2020 en, 2021 en, 2022 en, 2023 en, 2024 en, 2025 en, 2026 en

=== Racing Post ===
- 1994, 1996, 1997, 1998, 1999, 2000, 2001, 2002, 2003, 2004 2005, 2006, 2007, 2008, 2009, 2010, 2011, 2012, 2013, 2014 2015, 2016, 2017, 2018, 2019, 2020, 2021, 2022, 2023, 2024 2025, 2026
