= Synergy (disambiguation) =

Synergy is the creation of a whole that is greater than the simple sum of its parts.

Synergy may also refer to:

== Aircraft ==
- Synergy Aircraft Synergy, a US kit aircraft
- Synergy Paramotors Synergy, for paragliders
- Sol Synergy, a Brazilian paraglider design

== Companies ==
- Synergy Group, a Latin American conglomerate
- Synergy (electricity corporation), Western Australia
- Synergy (video game company), a Japanese video game developer and publisher
- Synergy Art Production, an Egyptian art production company
- Brand of Kombucha by GT's Living Foods
- SynergySP, a Japanese animation studio

== Entertainment ==
- Synergy, an electronic music project by Larry Fast
- Synergy (Covenant album)
- Synergy (Dave Weckl Band album), 1999
- Synergy (Champ Lui-Pio album)
- Synergy (Extol album)
- Synergy (Move album)
- Synergy (Shaman's Harvest album)
- Synergy (7th Heaven album)
- Synergy (song), a song by Dance Gavin Dance
- "Synergy", a song by Haywyre
- Synergy (mod), a modification for the Valve game engine
- Synergy, a computer in the TV series Jem
- Synergy (DC Comics), a superhero

== Technology ==
- Synergy (software), for sharing a keyboard and mouse
- Rational Synergy, a software revision control tool
- Hybrid Synergy Drive, a Toyota vehicle technology
- Synergy School Radio, UK

== Other ==
- Synergetics
- Synergism (theology), theory of salvation
- Synergy (horse)
- Corporate synergy of a company acquisition
- Synergy model of nursing
- Obligatory synergies, spasticity
- A SoBe beverage brand
- Digital Keyboards Synergy, derived from the Bell Labs Digital Synthesizer
- Synergy is a brand name used by ExxonMobil and Esso that identifies their fuel detergent additive technology

== See also ==
- Cinergi Pictures, a film production company
- Cinergy, an energy company in Ohio
- Sinergy, a Finnish heavy metal band
