= Sol Oriens =

Japanese-bred thoroughbred racehorse

Sol Oriens; ソールオリエンス
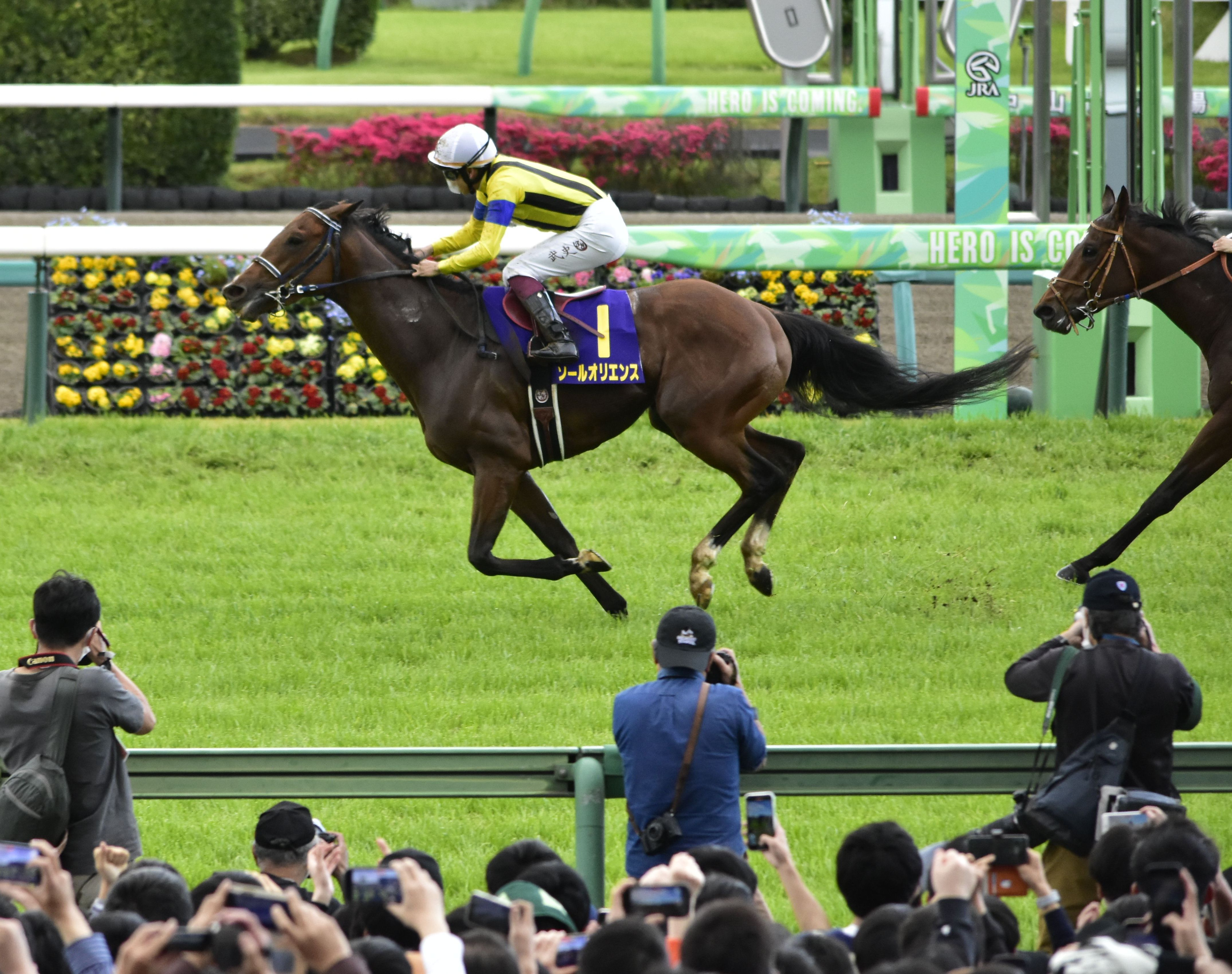
- Sol Oriens winning the 2023 Satsuki Shō
- Sire: Kitasan Black
- Grandsire: Black Tide
- Dam: Skia
- Damsire: Motivator
- Sex: Stallion
- Foaled: April 4, 2020 (age 6)
- Country: Japan
- Color: Bay
- Breeder: Shadai Farm
- Owner: Shadai Racehorse Co Ltd
- Racing colours
- Trainer: Takahisa Tezuka
- Jockey: Takeshi Yokoyama
- Record: 16: 3-3-1
- Earnings: ¥581,661,000

Major wins
- Keisei Hai (2023); Japanese Classic Race wins: Satsuki Shō (2023)
- Last updated on August 12, 2026

Sol Oriens (Japanese: ソールオリエンス, Hepburn: Sōru Oriensu; foaled April 4, 2020) is a retired Japanese Thoroughbred racehorse. His major wins include the Keisei Hai and the Satsuki Shō.

His name was derived from a Latin word which means "rising sun".

== Background ==
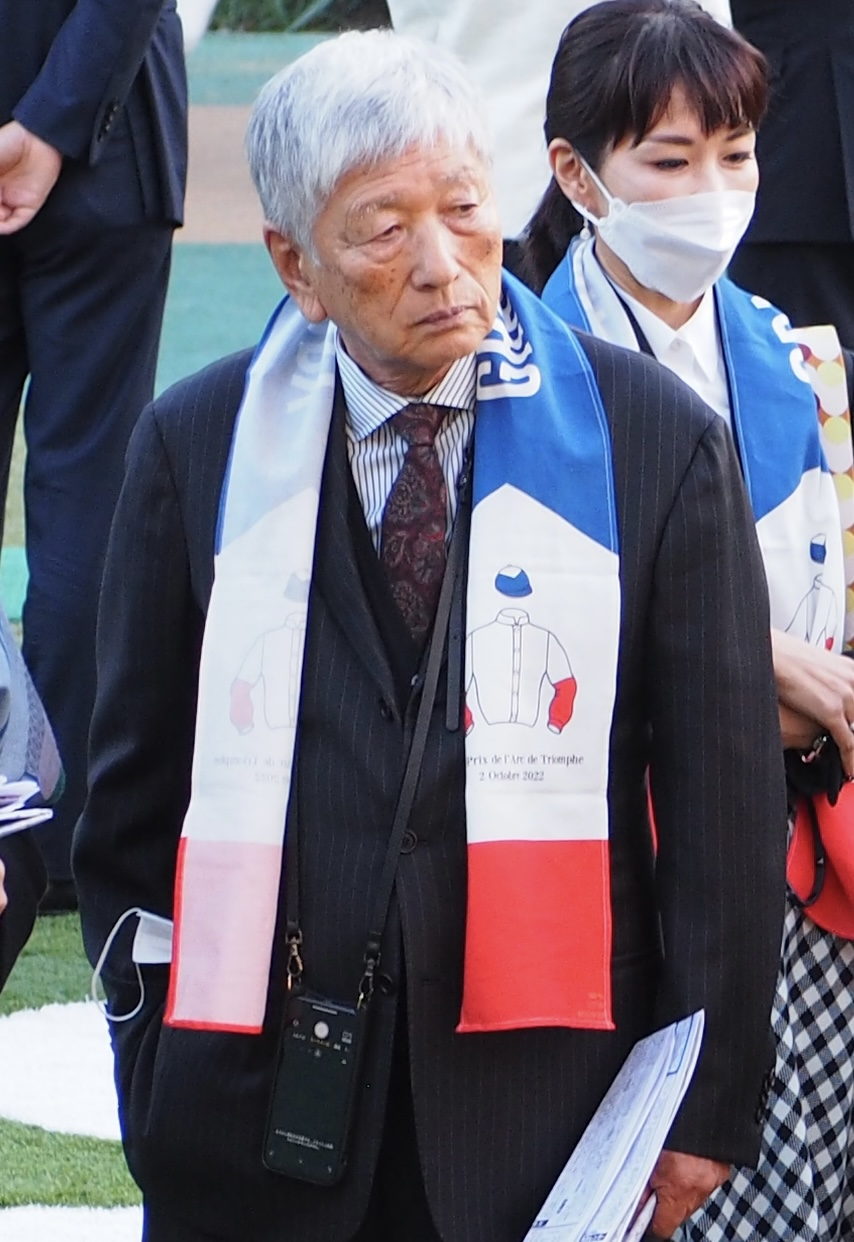
Teruya Yoshida

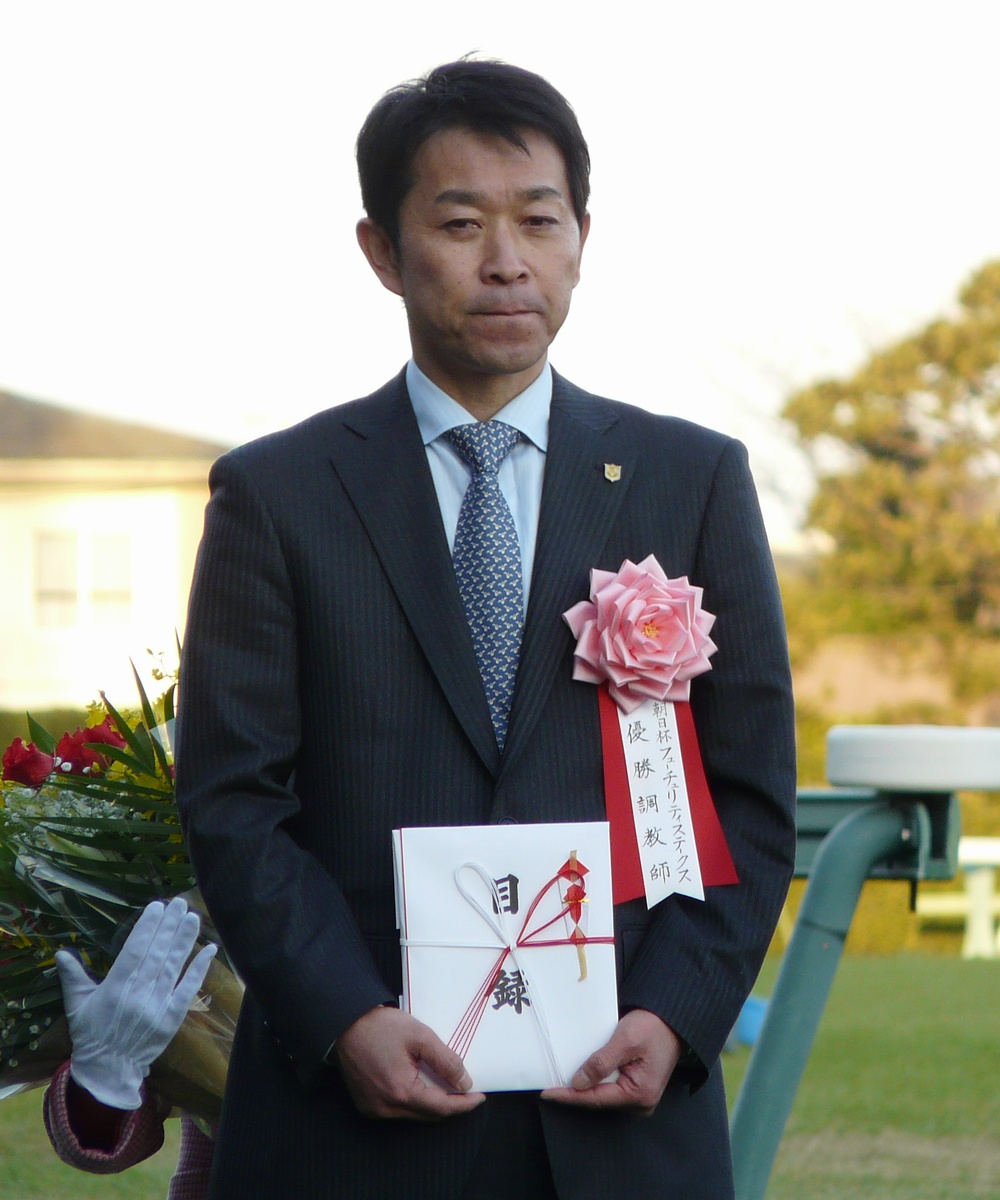
Takahisa Tezuka

Sol Oriens' father Kitasan Black, who was owned by enka singer Saburo Kitajima, won seven GI races during his career. His offspring includes Equinox, who is the Japanese Horse of the Year in 2022 and the world's best racehorse in 2023 according to Timeform. His mother, Skia, has won the G3 Prix Fille de l'Air and three other races in France. His half-brother Vin de Garde won the G2 Fuji Stakes as well as finishing 2nd and 3rd in the GI Dubai Turf in 2021 and 2022 respectively. His half-sisters Foteinos and Selenophos each have two wins. His damsire, Motivator, won the Epsom Derby. His maternal grand dam, Light Quest, won one race in France. His maternal grand dam's sire, Quest for Fame, also won the Epsom Derby.

Sol Oriens was foaled at the Shadai Farm in Abira, Hokkaido on April 4, 2020. He is currently in training by Takahisa Tezuka. He is currently owned by Shadai Racehorse Co Ltd, an organization that offers stakes in horse ownership (Hitokuchi Banushi; Japanese: 一口馬主) for a total of 60 million yen (150,000 yen per share).

In November 2021, Sol Oriens suffered a mild fracture in his left hind leg. He was raised at the Shadai Farm until August 2022. Whenever Teruya Yoshida visited the stable, he always asked about his weight as he was concerned about how much it was increasing. Regarding Kitasan Black's offspring, he said, "Most of them improve gradually as time goes on, it might be better to not run too much as a 2 year old". His trainer Takahisa Tezuka met him for the first time in May 2021. He said, "His gait felt springy. I thought the firmness of his muscles was good for an untrained horse."

== Racing career ==
=== 2022: two-year-old season ===
On September 8, 2022, Sol Oriens passed his gate test at Miho Training Center. Afterwards, he underwent adjustments at the Yamamoto training center, and returned to his home stable at Miho training center on October 8. He was supposed to debut with Yutaka Take has his jockey, but it was changed to Keita Tosaki instead. Before the race, Keita commented, "His running style seems flexible. He has something good" and his trainer expressed his hopes, saying, "He's a horse that I want to ride in the classics".

Sol Oriens made his debut at the Tokyo Racecourse on November 13 in a 2-year-old newcomer race on turf (1800m). Upon leaving the gate, he bumped into the horse next to him and settled into third position during the race. He won the race by the neck in a fierce battle with Lebensstil. Keita commented, "He had the ability and has good footwork. He ran the race well. His siblings can be a bit high-strung, but today he was fine. We'll see how he performs with more experience. I believe he has potential."

=== 2023: three-year-old season ===
Sol Oriens was scheduled to run on January 15, 2023, at the Keisei Hai at the Nakayama Racecourse. His jockey, Takeshi Yokoyama, mentioned before the race, "It seems like it will take some time for him to reach his full potential, but even in graded races, he might deliver some good performance." His trainer stated, "He will run well. I have some concerns about his suitability in Nakayama, but I have no doubts about his running ability." He started as the second favorite at the odds of 2.7 on the race day. After the start, he raced in fourth position from the rear during the middle of the race. Making a move around the 3rd and 4th corners, he approached the leading pack. Despite veering outwards, he corrected himself and unleashed his powerful legs in the homestretch, breaking through the rest of the field. He won convincingly by two and a half lengths with the fastest final 3 furlongs in 34.5 seconds. This marked his second consecutive victory and his first win in a graded stakes race. Additionally, both his trainer and his jockey achieved their first Keisei Hai victories. His jockey commented, "He tends to lean to the right during training, so I was cautious. Unfortunately, he veered outward, causing inconvenience to other horses. I feel sincerely sorry. I hope he grows both mentally and physically and becomes more considerate of other horses. However, I believe we can expect good things from him for the classics." His trainer added, "He looked like Duramente. While there are many areas to work on, it's clear that he can handle the distance. I think we can proceed to the next race with confidence."

On February 17, it was announced that Sol Oriens would run directly at the Satsuki Sho (Japanese 2000 Guineas) without using a trial race. The race was scheduled on April 16 at the Nakayama Racecourse. His jockey, Takeshi Yokoyama, mentioned before the race, "No complaints. His condition is flawless". His trainer remarked, "Even though he is popular, I think he is a horse that can live up to that expectation." On the day of the race, he was the second favorite at the odds of 5.2, following Phantom Thief at 3.8, and track was at its softest since 1989. The race unfolded at a fast pace within the first 1,000 meters, clocking in 58.5 seconds. Starting from the innermost gate, he chose to avoid the rough inner part of the track, staying towards the back. Around the fourth corner, he swung widest from second position from the back, entering the homestretch. Putting in a strong finishing kick, he overtook Tastiera, who was in a good position forward, winning the race with an undefeated record and claiming his first Grade 1 victory. It was the first time in history that a horse that used the Keisei Hai as a preparatory race to win in the Satsuki Sho. Winning the Satsuki Sho in his third race since debut is the fewest career starts for a winner. He ran the fastest final 3 furlongs in 35.5 seconds, 0.9 seconds faster than the second-place finisher Phantom Thief, which was a historic difference (the previous record was 0.6 seconds, shared by Narita Taishin and Duramente). The victory, starting from the 17th position around the fourth corner, was the largest comeback win in history (the previous record was Narita Taishin from the 12th position). He was the 20th undefeated horse to win since Efforia in 2021. He was the 4th horse in history to win from the innermost gate, following Yaeno Muteki in 1988, Triple Crown winner Narita Brian in 1994, and Triple Crown winner Contrail in 2020. It's also the first Japanese classic victory for Kitasan Black's offspring and the first Satsuki Sho victory for his trainer Takahisa Tezuka. Takeshi Yokoyama expressed, "The track was bad so I wanted to run on the outside. His initial speed was not as expected when I planned to take a position, but I decided to go with the horse's rhythm. If there was a chance of losing, it might have been due to the pace of the race or if there were stronger horses, but his condition was outstanding, and I was confident based on his warm-ups. He's a very good horse." He continued, "Despite riding many good horses regularly, I was not able to achieve good results last year, so I researched every day, and even then, the results didn't come. Thanks to this horse, I'm really happy to finally achieve good results here. Winning a GI after a long time, there's no greater joy than this. I haven't had good results in the Japanese Derby. Undoubtedly, he should still be improving, so I hope to showcase an improved performance with this horse on the next big stage for everyone." His trainer Takahisa Tezuka added, "It was beyond my imagination, and it was amazing. In a few races, he became popular among the fans and has delivered results under unfavorable conditions. I was wondering how he would handle difficult track conditions, but Takeshi rode him skillfully. Since he was the widest and farthest from the back, I didn't know if he would reach the goal in time. He galloped really well." Shadai Farm owner Teruya Yoshida said, "When he drew the innermost gate, I thought it would be tough. His damsire is Motivator, so from the beginning, I saw him as a type that could handle the extended distance and was suitable for the Derby." Shadai Racehorse owner Tetsuya Yoshida commented, "This pedigree is challenging to control, but this horse was relatively calm, so it may have worked out in a positive direction."

Sol Oriens was registered for the Japanese Derby (Tōkyō Yūshun), and the horse underwent training smoothly without any incidents leading up to the race. On May 25, the gate positions for the Derby were announced, and he drew gate number 5. This marked the third instance in the history of graded races where an undefeated horse who won the Satsuki Sho drew gate 5 in the Derby, following Symboli Rudolf in 1984, Deep Impact in 2005, and Contrail in 2020. All three of these horses went on to become undefeated Triple Crown winners, and notably, Contrail also drew gate 1 for the Satsuki Sho. In addition, among the horses that won from gate 5 was the Triple Crown winner Orfevre. The gate position drew a lot of expectations, and his winning odds went to 1.8, making him the favorite. The race began, and he had a great start and positioned himself near the front. The race was led by Pax Ottomanica, who won the Principal Stakes, and set a slow pace as the head of the pack. Sol Oriens positioned himself in mid-pack along the inside, waiting for his moment. In the homestretch, his jockey Takeshi Yokoyama let him off the bridle. With 350m left in the race, they found a path to the outside and made a final charge. In the final stretch, they held off late challengers, Hearts Concerto on the outside and Bellagio Opera, ridden by Takeshi's older brother Kazuo Yokoyama, from the inside. However, they couldn't catch Tastiera, whom Sol Oriens had defeated previously in the Satsuki Sho, finishing in second place, just a neck behind. Takeshi Yokoyama, who rode the favorite Efforia, finished second to Shahryar two years ago on the same race. This experience added to the intensity of Takeshi's desire to win the Derby this time. Despite the strong determination he expressed before the race, he fell short of redemption and was instead defeated by the horse he had previously defeated. The owner Shadai Racehorse was also unable to complete the double crown with Isla Bonita back in 2014. After the race, Takeshi Yokoyama expressed his regret, stating, "I apologize for not living up to being the favorite. There were moments where he showed a tendency to lean inward balance-wise." He also mentioned, "The slow pace affected his ability to show his speed in the stretch. It was really unlucky."

After resting for the whole summer, Sol Oriens would make a comeback at the St. Lite Kinen in September. Yokoyama was positive when speaking about the horse before the race and thought that he had progressed better than expected. He was the overwhelming favourite on the day with 1.6 odds against the rest of the field. Yokoyama positioned the horse well during the race until the fourth corner, where several horses coming from the inside delayed their progress a bit. That delay was enough to cost them the position in the race as they finished in second place behind Lebensstil. Tezuka gave a mixed response about the race by saying that, despite there being some hindrance from other horses in the fourth corner, he claimed that the result showed that Sol Oriens was able to handle a longer-distance race. The next race he joined would be in the final leg of the classic races, the Kikuka Sho, where he would resume his battle against Tastiera once more. Two weeks before the race at the final workout session, Junji Shimada, who rode him during that time declared that the horse moved easily, calmly and got up to speed quicker than it actually was. Setting up as the race favourite, Sol Oriens was calm in setting pace, moving onto the outside in fifth to sixth from the rear, made headway at the third corner, and made a wide sweeping bid into the straight. He managed to pick up the pace in the straight and catch some more horses before finishing third, five lengths behind the winner, Durezza, who was on a four-win streak ahead of the competition. Yokoyama commented after the race, "I was able to run the race the way I wanted, and he's a smart horse so he settled down quickly. I was able to hold off Tastiera around the third and fourth corners, and he felt good, but I think the distance was a little too long, as he didn't show his usual explosive power. Unlike the previous race, he was able to show his full potential, and he did a great job."

After finishing all classic races in the podium positions, Shadai Racehorse announced that Sol Oriens would aim for Arima Kinen glory at the end of the year, with Tastiera expected to join too. On 21 December, the draw for the gates was conducted and Sol Oriens would be started from Gate 1, the same gate he got from his in back in the Satsuki Sho, which was held on the same racetrack, Nakayama. Tezuka said to the press after the draw, "He drew the number 1 gate in the Satsuki Sho (Japanese 2000 Guineas), so I think it's a good draw. He's recovered from the fatigue of the Kikuka Sho (Japanese St. Leger) and will be in perfect condition." His jockey this time around would be Yuga Kawada. Kawada spoke about his new assignment, "It was just as I imagined. In a good way, he is still immature, and he has the back that makes me think he will get even better next year." On race day, despite securing a good inside gate, he started late and mingled in the middle pack near tenth position along the way. He started making moves in the later phase but gassed out 100 metres to the line and ended up in eighth place. Tezuka commented on his feature today, "It wasn't a bad race, but he was running cautiously, keeping an eye on the rail. He was also a little cramped in the final straight. He's getting stronger little by little."

=== 2024: four-year-old season ===
On 25 February, Sol Oriens kickstarted his season with an appearance at the Nakayama Kinen. This time, he was ridden by Hironobu Tanabe, his test jockey pre-debut. Tanabe remarked that he was easy to ride and praised his footwork whilst Tezuka said his weight did not change and glad that the final workout worked well. In the race, he stayed mostly at the rear and chased the lead in the early phase. Tanabe surged him for a move at the third corner. On the straight, they recorded the fastest spurt, but the lead group's pace never dropped, as they finished in fourth place. Tanabe said the outside-track conditions and the fact that the leading group's pace never fell were the reasons Sol Oriens could not win that race. Next, he would be racing in the Osaka Hai at the end of March with a returning Yokoyama on the saddle. For his pre-race workout this time around, Tezuka put a heavier load on him to see how he moved. Turned out he ran well and accelerated better on the track. As the race began, Sol Oriens fit himself in the ninth position before trying to make headway on the backstretch. The pace was never there as he finished in seventh place, three-and-a-quarters lengths behind the winner, Bellagio Opera. Despite finishing below the prize spot, Yokoyama claimed that Sol Oriens already ran a race according to the strategy they planned. To end the first half of the season, Tezuka decided to run him at the Takarazuka Kinen in Hanshin. Training progressed smoothly, and Tezuka was pleased with the workout, saying, "He showed the burst of energy he usually does. Last week we worked him hard in the last furlong, so this week we kept the whole pace fast but let him run at a good rhythm at the end, just getting him excited." "He moved just as we wanted, it was great". The race day turned out to be cloudy, and the track was considered in a yielding state. The race began, and Sol Oriens settled wide around seventh, dropping position turning the last corners wide to enter the stretch in 12th. At the final straight, he launched the tied fastest late drive to secure the runner-up spot just before the wire by a neck behind the winner, Blow the Horn. His positive finish this time encouraged Yokoyama and Tezuka to look forward what more he had in the second half of the campaign.

His next race would be the Tenno Sho (Autumn) in October. Considering Sol Oriens showed his full potential during soft tracks and rainy conditions, the sunny forecasted weather did not excite the team as much, but his groom, Omura, stayed positive and believed that the jockey would find the right balance. In the race, he broke out of the gate and positioned himself in eighth. He showed effort to improve his position on the final straight, but it was not enough as he finished in seventh place on the day. Yokoyama said that Sol Oriens used all his legs on the day and his placement for the race was not so bad considering the competition they just faced. In November, it was announced that Sol Oriens would run in the Japan Cup at the Tokyo Racecourse with Yokoyama still being his jockey for the race. This would be the first time since last season's Tokyo Yushun that he would compete in a 2400 metres counter-clockwise race in Tokyo. For this race workout session, Tezuka put him in the position of maintaining the pace instead of chasing the lead from the back, as he rode another horse beside him and watched how Sol Oriens tracked him. Tezuka was glad that the horse was up to speed with the exercise. According to plan, the horse broke straight to the front group and led the pack in second position alongside Shin Emperor. Halfway through the backstretch, Durezza started moving forward and contested both of the lead horses. Into the fourth corner, Sol Oriens still maintained his pace at the front but faded out in the homestretch as every horse overtook him. He ended up in last place (14th) on the day, one second behind the 13th place finisher, Karate. Yokoyama spoke after the race, "I had talked with the trainer about taking a slightly more aggressive approach, so we were able to get into second place smoothly and easily without forcing it. However, it turned into a slow-paced race that came down to a burst of speed, and we were left behind at the crucial moment."

=== 2025: five-year-old season ===
Sol Oriens was looking to bounce back from his mishap in the Japan Cup by starting at the Kyoto Kinen in February. This time, Tezuka held back the horse in training and kept him from stretching out too much because it built up fatigue last time they did it. This time, Kawada took the assignment since the Arima Kinen, two years ago. Despite racing in favourable track conditions, Sol Oriens failed to make a bid for the win and only finished in fifth place. Kawada summarised that race with a note of disappointment, as he felt he was riding him better two years ago, even though he finished in a better spot this time. He waited for Cervinia to make her move, but that disrupted the whole rhythm of the race. Regardless, he saw some signs of improvement from the last race and hoped for a better result next time. On 12 March, the team declared that the horse would run in the Osaka Hai with a new jockey, Kohei Matsuyama. During the workout, Matsuyama noted that the horse was able to run within the set time and pointed to his big strides, which would affect the race rhythm. On race day, Sol Oriens started at the far back of the pack, and he angled out in the corners. Despite that setback, he covered the ground well on his late charges and managed to finish in tenth. Matsuyama apologised for his performance and quoted in the post-race, " He didn't get a good start, but I focused on maintaining his rhythm. He showed incredible speed when we rounded the fourth corner. However, it was a GI race, and the competition was strong, so I think he struggled a bit at the end. He had a good feel from the warm-up, and he rode like a true GI winner. I thought he was a horse that could definitely do well, so I'm sorry that it ended up being such a disappointing result." In June, he attempted the Takarazuka Kinen for the second time with Matsuyama stayed as his jockey. Matsuyama noted that the weather might be favourable for them and the presence of Meisho Tabaru, who was a front-runner, meant that the race pace was not going to be slow. Tezuka, who loved to switch around his training method did it once again as this time he instructed the horse to run uphill and found that Sol Oriens's form was excellent, just the on track result was not coming yet. When the race began, Matsuyama carried on the same strategy by holding at the back in the early phase, but this time without a late start and weird cornering affecting them. At the homestretch, Sol Oriens put the second-fastest spurt in the field but only improved his final position to sixth place. Matsuyama said he did get a good start but could not maintained the pace as much, ended up in a back, which forcing him to brute force the final stretch. On the other hand, Matsuyama praised Sol Oriens's fighting spirit in the race, which was led by various excellent front-runners, and thought he had more in him for the next race.

He rested for the whole summer and returned on the Tenno Sho (Autumn) in October for his second time around. His jockey for this race would be Yuji Tannai. Tezuka spoke out about his workout pre-race, "The times were a little slow, but it was within expectations. The movement itself was good, and both jockeys felt good about it. I think they've now gotten to know each other's quirks," emphasizing the smooth progress of the race. It was decided that he would start from gate 4 this time. Assistant trainer Omura was happy with the draw and believed that Tannai could do the job well on race day. When the gates opened, Sol Oriens hugged the inside track, mostly in ninth position. As they reached the final straight, Sol Oriens never improved on his running, was surpassed by other horses, and ended up in last place (14th). Tannai was distraught after the race and lost any words on why Sol Oriens failed to pick up the pace at the end. It was discovered after the race that Sol Oriens had already struggled with lingering back and loin fatigue. After receiving many offers for his stud availability, Shadai decided to retire him from racing and moved him to Breeders Stallion Station in Hidaka, Hokkaido. Tezuka hoped for the bright future of his future offspring in the racing scenes.

== Racing statistics ==
Below data is based on data available on JBIS Search, and netkeiba.com.

Date	Track	Race	Grade	Distance (Condition)	Entry	HN	Odds (Favored)	Finish	Time	Margins	Jockey	Winner (Runner-up)
2022 – two-year-old season
Nov 13	Tokyo	Maiden race		1800 m (Firm)	9	5	1.4 (1)	1st	1:50.8	0.0	Keita Tosaki	(Lebensstil)
2023 – three-year-old season
Jan 15	Nakayama	Keisei Hai	3	2000 m (Firm)	9	4	2.7 (2)	1st	2:02.2	-0.4	Takeshi Yokoyama	(Omega Rich Man)
Apr 16	Nakayama	Satsuki Shō	1	2000 m (Yielding)	18	1	5.2 (2)	1st	2:00.6	-0.2	Takeshi Yokoyama	(Tastiera)
May 28	Tokyo	Tōkyō Yūshun	1	2400 m (Firm)	18	5	1.8 (1)	2nd	2:25.2	0.0	Takeshi Yokoyama	Tastiera
Sep 18	Nakayama	St Lite Kinen	2	2200 m (Firm)	15	14	1.6 (1)	2nd	2:11.7	0.3	Takeshi Yokoyama	Lebensstil
Oct 22	Kyoto	Kikuka-shō	1	3000 m (Firm)	17	14	2.7 (1)	3rd	3:04.0	0.9	Takeshi Yokoyama	Durezza
Dec 24	Nakayama	Arima Kinen	1	2500 m (Firm)	16	1	6.5 (4)	8th	2:31.6	0.7	Yuga Kawada	Do Deuce
2024 – four-year-old season
Feb 25	Nakayama	Nakayama Kinen	2	1800 m (Good)	16	3	3.4 (1)	4th	1:48.6	0.5	Hironobu Tanabe	Matenro Sky
Mar 31	Hanshin	Ōsaka Hai	1	2000 m (Firm)	16	10	8.2 (5)	7th	1:58.7	0.5	Takeshi Yokoyama	Bellagio Opera
Jun 23	Kyoto	Takarazuka Kinen	1	2200 m (Yielding)	13	9	16.9 (7)	2nd	2:12.3	0.3	Takeshi Yokoyama	Blow the Horn
Oct 27	Tokyo	Tenno Sho (Autumn)	1	2000 m (Firm)	15	6	15.4 (7)	7th	1:57.7	0.4	Takeshi Yokoyama	Do Deuce
Nov 24	Tokyo	Japan Cup	1	2400 m (Firm)	14	12	35.7 (9)	14th	2:27.7	2.2	Takeshi Yokoyama	Do Deuce
2025 – five-year-old season
Feb 16	Kyoto	Kyōto Kinen	2	2200 m (Good)	12	11	4.7 (2)	5th	2:16.1	0.4	Yuga Kawada	Yoho Lake
Apr 6	Hanshin	Osaka Hai	1	2000 m (Firm)	15	4	38.0 (11)	10th	1:56.8	0.7	Kohei Matsuyama	Bellagio Opera
Jun 15	Hanshin	Takarazuka Kinen	1	2200 m (Good)	17	4	18.6 (8)	6th	2:12.1	1.0	Kohei Matsuyama	Meisho Tabaru
Nov 2	Tokyo	Tenno Sho (Autumn)	1	2000 m (Firm)	14	4	50.3 (12)	14th	1:59.3	0.7	Yuji Tannai	Masquerade Ball

Legend:
Turf

== Pedigree ==
Pedigree of Sol Oriens (JPN), bay stallion, 2020
Sire Kitasan Black b. 2012	Black Tide d.b. 2001	Sunday Silence (USA)	Halo
Sire Kitasan Black b. 2012	Black Tide d.b. 2001	Sunday Silence (USA)	Wishing Well
Sire Kitasan Black b. 2012	Black Tide d.b. 2001	Wind in Her Hair (IRE)	Alzao (USA)
Sire Kitasan Black b. 2012	Black Tide d.b. 2001	Wind in Her Hair (IRE)	Burghclere (GB)
Sire Kitasan Black b. 2012	Sugar Heart b. 2005	Sakura Bakushin O	Sakura Yutaka O
Sire Kitasan Black b. 2012	Sugar Heart b. 2005	Sakura Bakushin O	Sakura Hagoromo
Sire Kitasan Black b. 2012	Sugar Heart b. 2005	Otome Gokoro	Judge Angelucci (USA)
Sire Kitasan Black b. 2012	Sugar Heart b. 2005	Otome Gokoro	Tizly (USA)
Dam Skia (FR) b. 2007	Motivator (GB) b. 2002	Montjeu (IRE)	Sadler's Wells (USA)
Dam Skia (FR) b. 2007	Motivator (GB) b. 2002	Montjeu (IRE)	Floripedes (FR)
Dam Skia (FR) b. 2007	Motivator (GB) b. 2002	Out West (USA)	Gone West
Dam Skia (FR) b. 2007	Motivator (GB) b. 2002	Out West (USA)	Chellingoua
Dam Skia (FR) b. 2007	Light Quest (USA) b. 2000	Quest for Fame (GB)	Rainbow Quest (USA)
Dam Skia (FR) b. 2007	Light Quest (USA) b. 2000	Quest for Fame (GB)	Aryenne (FR)
Dam Skia (FR) b. 2007	Light Quest (USA) b. 2000	Gleam of Light (IRE)	Danehill (USA)
Dam Skia (FR) b. 2007	Light Quest (USA) b. 2000	Gleam of Light (IRE)	Gold Runner (Family: 1-k)
