= Tastiera =

In musical instructions, tastiera can refer to:

- Musical keyboard, on keyboard instruments
- Fingerboard, on string instruments

== See also ==
- Tastiera (horse), a Japanese thoroughbred horse
