= Synergist =

Broadly, a synergist is an entity that displays synergy with respect to another entity.

More specifically, a synergist may be:

- a synergist muscle
- a substance that enhances the effect of another substance, such as a drug (see Synergy § Biological sciences)
- something relating to the theological position of synergism

== See also ==
- Synergy (disambiguation)
- Synnergist (a video game)
