= Synergetics =

Synergetics can refer to:

- Synergetics (Fuller), a study of systems behavior suggested by Buckminster Fuller
- Synergetics (Haken), a school of thought on thermodynamics and other systems phenomena developed by Hermann Haken

== See also ==
- Synergy (disambiguation)
- Tensegrity, the use of internal forces to overcome external forces, as in a self-supporting sculpture.
