= Bellagio Opera =

Japanese Thoroughbred racehorse

Bellagio Opera ベラジオオペラ
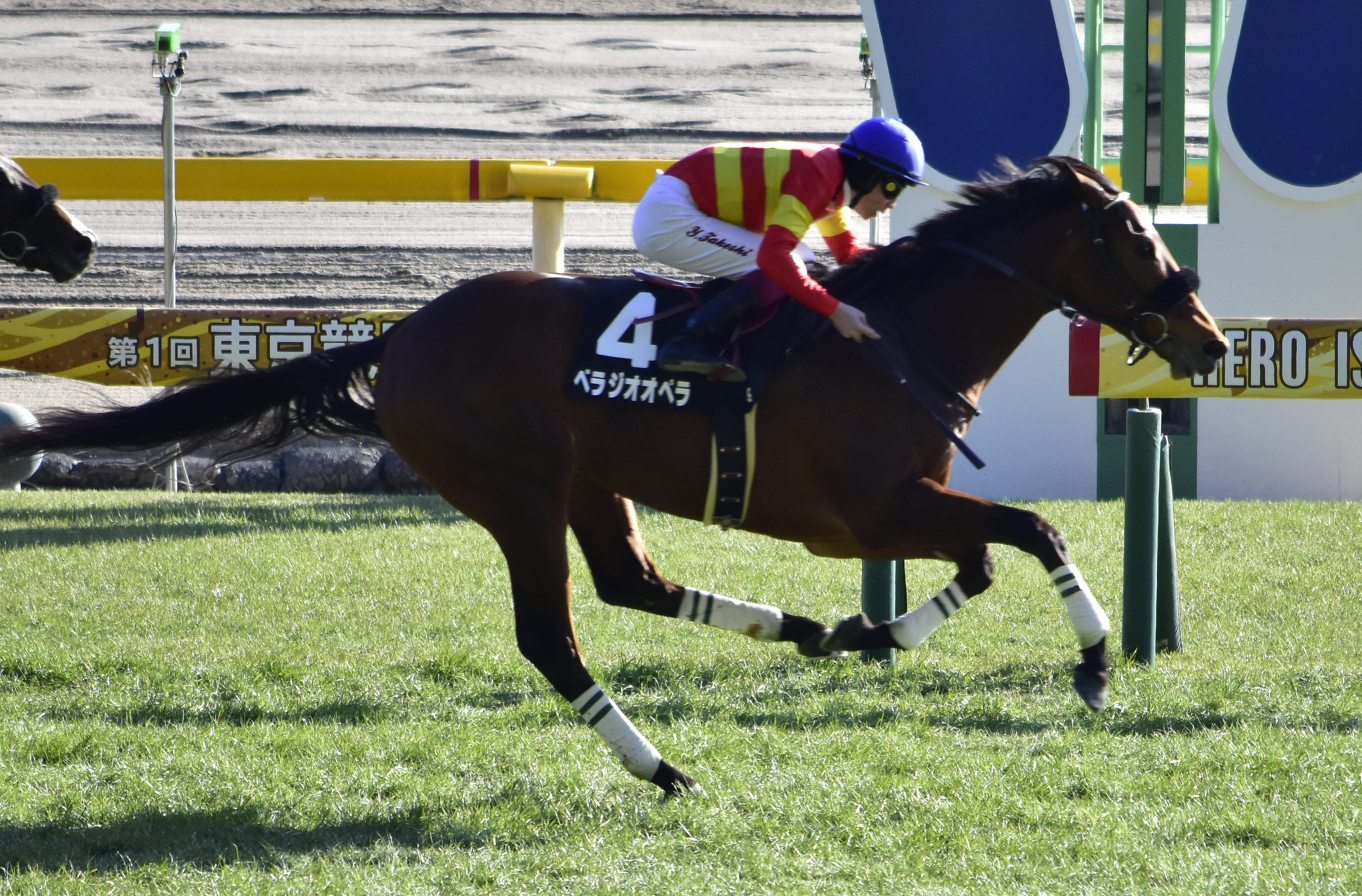
- Bellagio Opera in 2023
- Breed: Thoroughbred
- Sire: Lord Kanaloa
- Grandsire: King Kamehameha
- Dam: Air Routine
- Damsire: Harbinger
- Sex: Stallion
- Foaled: 7 April 2020
- Country: Japan
- Colour: Bay
- Breeder: Shadai Farm
- Owner: Shorai Hayashida; Bellagio Racing
- Racing colours
- Trainer: Hiroyuki Uemura
- Jockey: Kazuo Yokoyama
- Record: 14: 6–3–1
- Earnings: 944,734,000 Yen

Major wins
- Spring Stakes (2023); Challenge Cup (2023); Osaka Hai (2024, 2025)
- Last updated on 6 January 2026

Bellagio Opera (ベラジオオペラ ; foaled April 7, 2020) is a former Japanese thoroughbred racehorse and current stud. He is the first horse to win the Osaka Hai back to back since it was upgraded to G1. He also won the Challenge Cup and Spring Stakes. He was prominent mostly in Hanshin Racecourse where he managed to be on a podium in every single race of his career there.

== Background ==
Bellagio Opera was foaled out of Air Routine, who won one race out of five starts. He was sired by Lord Kanaloa, 2013 Japanese Horse of the Year and 2018 Japan Racing Association Hall of Fame inductees. As a one year old, he was listed on the select sale in July 2021 at 35 million yen. He was continued to be listed and finally sold at the 2022 Chiba Thoroughbred Sale for two-year-old for 48.51 million yen.

His name came from the crown name Bellagio and also Opera.

== Racing career ==
=== Two-year-old season (2022) ===
He only raced once in his maiden season, a 1800m turf debut race at Hanshin Racecourse. Jockeyed by Damian Lane, he won the race by a head over Air Meteora.

=== Three-year-old season (2023) ===
In his next season opening, he raced in the Saintpaulia Sho and got his second career win in two starts. His next race would be the Spring Stakes on March 19. He chased the leader by stayed mostly in the middle, smoothly rounded the third and fourth corners, and passed the leading horses on the outside in the straight, finishing one and a quarters lengths ahead of second-place finisher Ho O Biscuits. This win qualified him for the Satsuki Sho. In that race, he started aggressively from the gate and positioned himself well in the second place until he ran out of gas at the crucial stage which he ultimately finished tenth, his first lost. His jockey that time, Hiroyuki Tanabe stated that his aggressive approach backfired him at the end.

He went through his second classic race, the Tokyo Yushun in a better result as he recovered from the middle of the pack and showed the fastest speed to close in on the leaders, finishing in fourth place. His new jockey which in turn would be his permanent jockey for the rest of his career, Kazuo Yokoyama noted that he had a great stretch at the end of the race and acknowledged that Bellagio Opera was a powerful horse at late stage. He was scheduled for the Kobe Shimbun Hai and Kikuka Sho in the autumn but withdrew from both due to bad performance during summer training. In December, he returned to the race on the Challenge Cup at Hanshin. He made a good start, maintained his position before accelerated at the final straight to win the race whilst holding off Boccherini at the second place. This was his first win in three races and his second graded stakes win after the Spring Stakes.

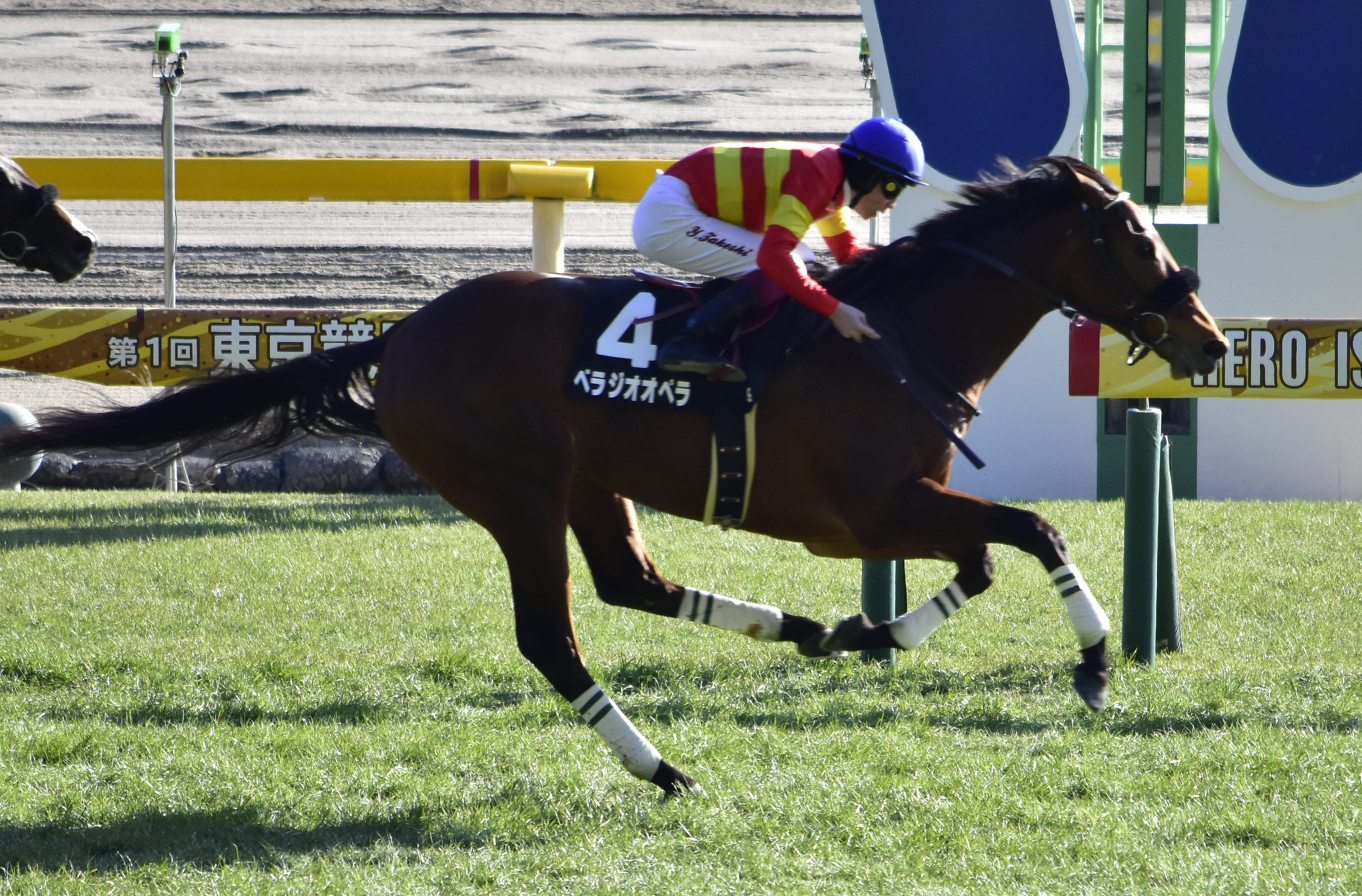
Saintpaulia Sho

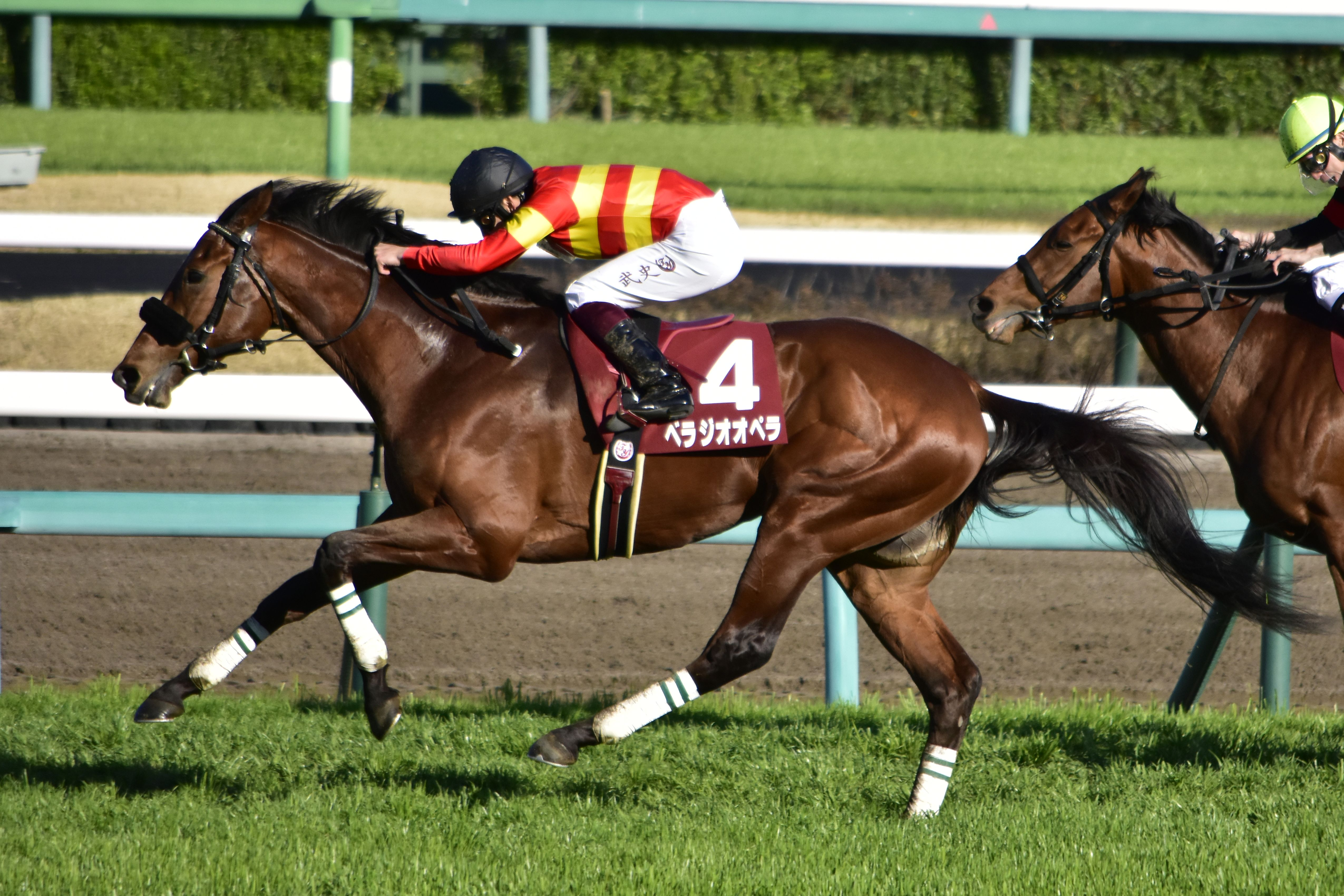
Spring Stakes

=== Four-year-old season (2024) ===
His first race this year would be the Kyoto Kinen on February 11 in which he narrowly lost out to Pradaria and finished in second place. He crossed the line three quarters behind the winner. Then, he joined the Osaka Hai on March 31. When the race began, Bellagio Opera rushed out to rally for the lead and settled just behind Stunning Rose to press the pace in second. Then, he continued to stalk the leading pack, turned the last two corners to enter the lane in close second, overtook the front before the 200 meter pole and managed to fend off the repeated efforts of Rousham Park and fast-closing Rouge Eveil to cross the wire a neck and a nose in front. This occasion marked the first G1 win for the horses and also his trainer, Hiroyuki Uemura.

On April 24, he ran in the Takarazuka Kinen. He was ranked third in the voting behind Do Deuce and Liberty Island (who eventually not running in it) with 141,489 votes. In the race, He rallied for the lead at the third corner but losing pace thereafter and caught up by Blow the Horn and Sol Oriens. He finished in third a neck behind Sol Oriens whilst holding off Pradaria's charge. He was rested in summer and started the autumn campaign in the Tenno Sho (Autumn). He did not manage to race well in this race as he only finished in sixth place. Yokoyama claimed that Bellagio Opera did not doing pretty well in the warmups lead up to this race due to the heat exhaustion but still managed to race greatly in the end. At the end of the year, Bellagio Opera was selected to race in the Arima Kinen and picked as the eighth favourite for the race. For most of the race, Bellagio Opera was in a duel with Danon Decile, who was jockeyed by his father Norihiro Yokoyama at the lead. He lost out to him until the final 50 meters where both Regaleira and Shahryar overtook both of them for the photo finish on the line. Bellagio Opera and the younger Yokoyama themselves finished in fourth place half length behind Danon Decile and the older Yokoyama.

=== Five-year-old season (2025) ===
In this year, Bellagio Opera started out with a big goal which was to defend his crown in the Osaka Hai. Despite being the defending champion, he was the third favourite leading into the race behind Stellenbosch and Sixpence. Bellagio Opera jumped from the gate quickly and maintained his position well alongside Sixpence. Desierto who was jockeyed by Kenichi Ikezoe took an early lead and set up a high pace (57.5 seconds on the first 1000 meters). When he gassed out, both Bellagio Opera and Sixpence pounced on the attack. Ho O Biscuits then split both of them and Sixpence moved outside and faded out as the race progress whilst Bellagio Opera was on the clear run in the final straight for his back to back win in the Osaka Hai. He was the second two times Osaka Hai winner ever (Sunrise Pegasus won this race back in 2002 and 2005 when it was a G2 race called Sankei Osaka Hai). He also set up the new record for the race.

In June, he was selected for another Takarazuka Kinen. He was the most voted horses for the race, collecting a whopping 228,950 votes from the fans. Although he tried to catch back the leader, Meisho Tabaru at the final straight, the latter went on to win the race by three lengths ahead of him. Meisho Tabaru led the race from wire-to-wire to take the crown. After the summer break, Bellagio Opera and his team accepted an invitation for the Hong Kong Cup in December, skipping the Tenno Sho (Autumn) and the rest of domestic autumn races. In the race, Bellagio Opera raced fiercely to the end on the outside track but finish second behind Romantic Warrior who would win his fourth Hong Kong Cup in a row. In the aftermath of the race, Yokoyama was suspended by the Hong Kong Jockey Club and got a HK$100,000 (approximately 2 million yen) fined due to the obstruction against Quisisana who ended up in third for that race.

On December 16, He would be retired right after the Hong Kong Cup and assigned to the stud duty at Shadai Stallion Station in Abira, Hokkaido. On December 24, his registration was terminated.

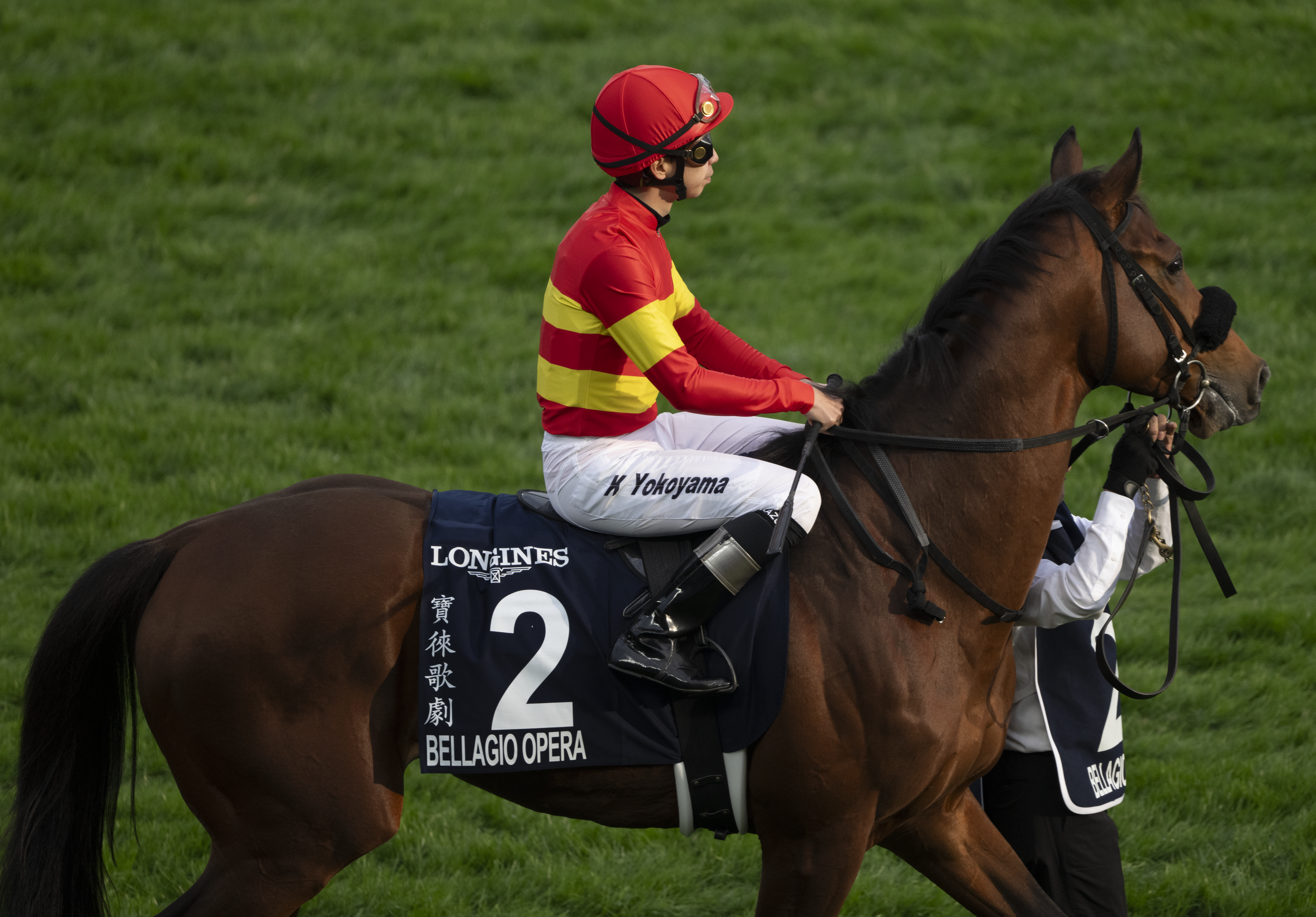
Hong Kong Cup

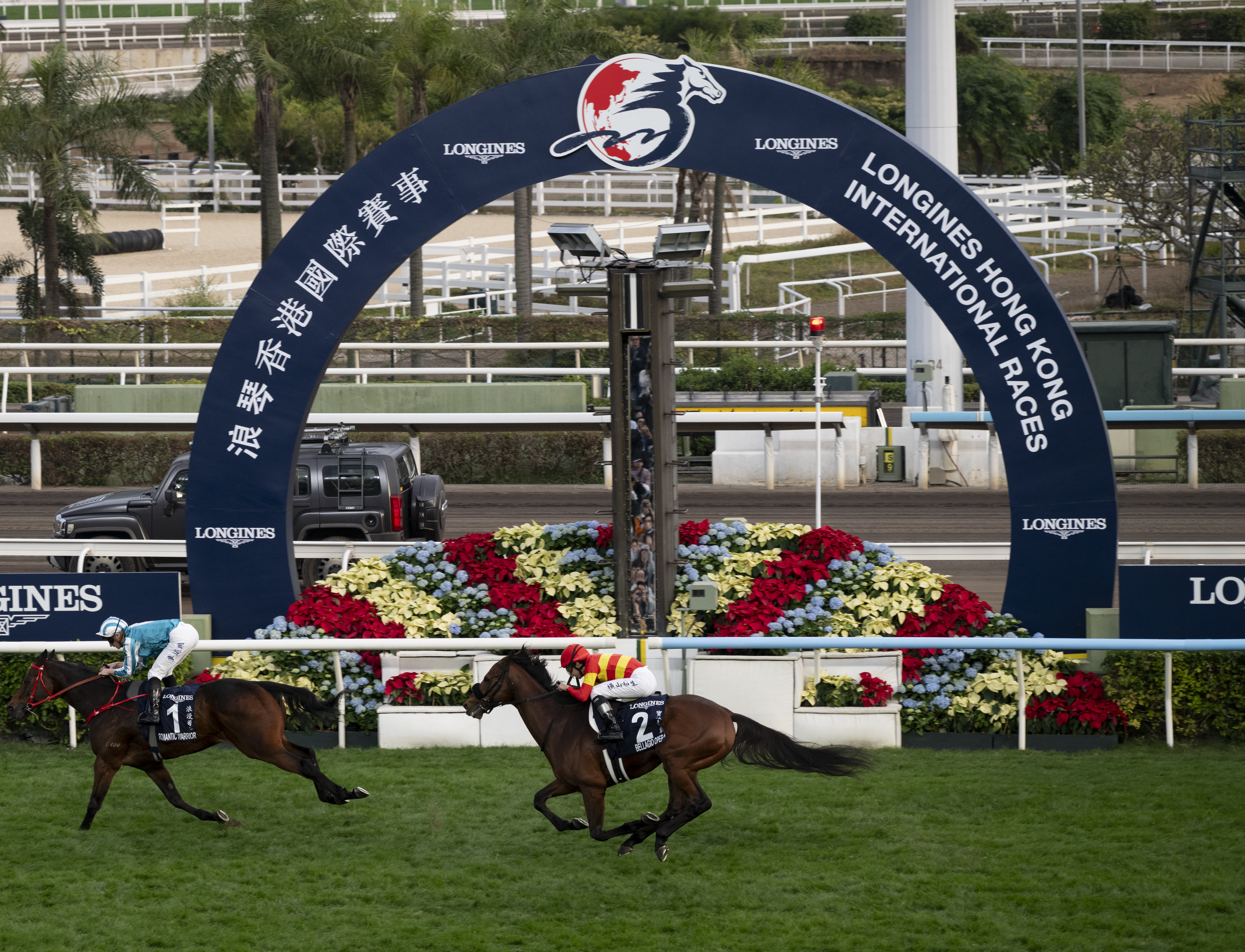
At the finishing line of the Hong Kong Cup

== Racing form ==
Bellagio Opera had won six and placed in another four races out of 14 starts. The data available is based on JBIS, netkeiba and HKJC.

Date	Track	Race	Grade	Distance (Condition)	Entry	HN	Odds (Favored)	Finish	Time	Margins	Jockey	Winner (Runner-up)
2022 – two-year-old season
Nov 20	Hanshin	2yo Newcomer		1,800 m (Good)	9	3	6.2 (3)	1st	1:48.0	0.0	Damian Lane	(Air Meteora)
2023 – three-year-old season
Jan 29	Tokyo	Saintpaulia Sho	1W	1,800 m (Firm)	8	4	2.9 (1)	1st	1:48.0	–0.2	Takeshi Yokoyama	(Tramandare)
Mar 19	Nakayama	Spring Stakes	2	1,800 m (Soft)	16	4	3.7 (2)	1st	1:48.9	–0.2	Takeshi Yokoyama	(Ho O Biscuits)
Apr 16	Nakayama	Satsuki Sho	1	2,000 m (Soft)	18	15	6.3 (3)	10th	2:02.4	1.8	Hiroyuki Tanabe	Sol Oriens
May 28	Tokyo	Tokyo Yushun	1	2,400 m (Firm)	18	1	54.9 (9)	4th	2:25.2	0.0	Kazuo Yokoyama	Tastiera
Dec 2	Hanshin	Challenge Cup	3	2,000 m (Firm)	13	5	5.5 (3)	1st	1:58.8	0.0	Kazuo Yokoyama	(Boccherini)
2024 – four-year-old season
Feb 11	Kyoto	Kyoto Kinen	2	2,200 m (Firm)	12	5	2.2 (1)	2nd	2:12.2	0.1	Kazuo Yokoyama	Pradaria
Mar 31	Hanshin	Osaka Hai	1	2,000 m (Firm)	16	11	5.5 (2)	1st	1:58.2	0.0	Kazuo Yokoyama	(Rousham Park)
Jun 23	Kyoto	Takarazuka Kinen	1	2,200 m (Soft)	13	3	11.6 (5)	3rd	2:12.4	0.4	Kazuo Yokoyama	Blow the Horn
Oct 27	Tokyo	Tenno Sho (Autumn)	1	2,000 m (Firm)	15	1	13.3 (4)	6th	1:57.7	0.4	Kazuo Yokoyama	Do Deuce
Dec 22	Nakayama	Arima Kinen	1	2,500 m (Firm)	15	5	7.1 (3)	4th	2:32.1	0.3	Kazuo Yokoyama	Regaleira
2025 – five-year-old season
Apr 6	Hanshin	Osaka Hai	1	2,000 m (Firm)	15	5	5.1 (2)	1st	R1:56.2	–0.2	Kazuo Yokoyama	(Lord del Rey)
Jun 15	Hanshin	Takarazuka Kinen	1	2,200 m (Good)	17	1	4.0 (1)	2nd	2:11.6	0.5	Kazuo Yokoyama	Meisho Tabaru
Dec 14	Sha Tin	Hong Kong Cup	1	2,000 m (Firm)	7	2	5.3 (2)	2nd	2:02.6	0.3	Kazuo Yokoyama	Romantic Warrior

Legend:
Turf

- R indicated that it was a record time finish

== Pedigree ==
Pedigree of Bellagio Opera
Sire Lord Kanaloa b. 2008	King Kamehameha b. 2001	Kingmambo	Mr. Prospector
Sire Lord Kanaloa b. 2008	King Kamehameha b. 2001	Kingmambo	Miesque
Sire Lord Kanaloa b. 2008	King Kamehameha b. 2001	Manfath	Last Tycoon
Sire Lord Kanaloa b. 2008	King Kamehameha b. 2001	Manfath	Pilot Bird
Sire Lord Kanaloa b. 2008	Lady Blossom b. 1996	Storm Cat	Storm Bird
Sire Lord Kanaloa b. 2008	Lady Blossom b. 1996	Storm Cat	Terlingua
Sire Lord Kanaloa b. 2008	Lady Blossom b. 1996	Saratoga Dew	Cormorant
Sire Lord Kanaloa b. 2008	Lady Blossom b. 1996	Saratoga Dew	Super Luna
Dam Air Routine ch. 2012 (FNo: 4-r)	Harbinger b. 2006	Dansili	Danehill
Dam Air Routine ch. 2012 (FNo: 4-r)	Harbinger b. 2006	Dansili	Hasili
Dam Air Routine ch. 2012 (FNo: 4-r)	Harbinger b. 2006	Penang Pearl	Bering
Dam Air Routine ch. 2012 (FNo: 4-r)	Harbinger b. 2006	Penang Pearl	Guapa
Dam Air Routine ch. 2012 (FNo: 4-r)	Air Magdalene ch. 2003	Sunday Silence	Halo
Dam Air Routine ch. 2012 (FNo: 4-r)	Air Magdalene ch. 2003	Sunday Silence	Wishing Well
Dam Air Routine ch. 2012 (FNo: 4-r)	Air Magdalene ch. 2003	Air Deja Vu	Northern Taste
Dam Air Routine ch. 2012 (FNo: 4-r)	Air Magdalene ch. 2003	Air Deja Vu	I Dreamed a Dream

- Bellagio Opera is an inbred by 5 x 5 to Northern Dancer (Northern Taste's and Storm Bird's sire)
- Bellagio Opera's great-grand dam, Air Deja Vu, is the half-sister of Air Shakur, and the winner of the 1998 Queen Stakes. Air Deja Vu also foaled Air Shady, who won the 2008 American Jockey Club Cup, and Air Messiah, who won the Shūka Sho and Rose Stakes in 2005.
