= Synergy (horse) =

French-bred Thoroughbred racehorse

- Sire: Victory Note
- Grandsire: Fairy King
- Dam: Kuddam
- Damsire: Doyoun
- Sex: Mare
- Foaled: 2005
- Country: France
- Colour: Bay
- Breeder: Jan H. Stulen
- Owner: De La Fuente Stud
- Trainer: Yan Durepaire
- Earnings: € 185,000 (equivalent)

Major wins
- Prix Fille de l'Air (2009); Prix de la Pepiniere (2008)
- Last updated on February 15, 2010

Synergy (foaled April 23, 2005) is a Thoroughbred racehorse bred in France. She is a bay mare by Victory Note (by Fairy King) out of Kuddam (by Doyoun). Synergy is a full sister to Veendam, a winner in France. She is owned by De La Fuente Stud, a group from Madrid, Spain. During her career Synergy became a popular filly among Spanish race fans, known for her determination to win races. She is a double stakes winner and was placed in stakes company on her final outing as a racehorse.

== Breeding ==
Synergy was bred by Jan Stulen in Normandy, France at Haras de la Reboursiere et de Montaigu. She was born on 23 April 2005 and is the fourth foal out of Kuddam.

Kuddam is a brown mare by 2000 Guineas winner Doyoun out of the Habitat mare Forest Lair. Kuddam was bred by Shadwell Estate near Thetford in Norfolk, England. Born in 1990, Kuddam was sent to trainer Dermot Weld in Ireland where she was placed four times for owner/breeder Sheikh Hamdan Al Maktoum. At the Tattersalls December sales in 1993 Kuddam was sold to Germany where she continued her race career. At four, five and seven years, Kuddam won three races and was placed another four times. She also won two races over jumps and was placed another seven times. In 1998 Kuddam was sold at Baden Baden to Dutch breeder Jan Stulen. In 1999 she was sent to Coolmore Stud in Ireland to get covered by French Guineas winner and first season sire Victory Note.

Victory Note is a bay stallion by champion sire Fairy King (full brother to Sadler's Wells) out of Jaazeiro mare Three Piece. Victory Note was bred by jockey Walter Swinburn and was born on 30 March 1995. Sent to trainer Peter Chapple-Hyam for owners Sue Magnier and Robert Sangster, Victory Note was raced four times as a two-year-old and finished that year with a third place in the Group 3 Horris Hill Stakes at Newbury. The following year Victory Note won the Group 3 Greenham stakes at Newbury, followed by a classic win in the Group 1 Poule d'Essai des Poulains at Longchamp. Victory Note won that race in a race record time that still stands today.

In 2004 Kuddam returned to Victory Note, this time in France at his new home at Haras de la Reboursiere et de Montaigu.

== Racing career ==
=== 2007 ===
Synergy was trained in Spain by Frenchman Yan Durepaire, who has been a trainer in Madrid since 1995.

She made her career debut on 28 October 2007 at the La Zarzuela racecourse of Madrid. In the race for two-year-olds over 1500 meters, Synergy finished in sixth position.

Her next race was a month later, on 27 November 2007, again at the La Zarzuela racecourse. This time the race was over 1600 meters. Synergy improved one place to finish in fifth position. Another month later, on 30 December 2007, Synergy had her final outing as a two-year-old, this time on the Dos Hermanas race course of Seville. With this race over 1600 meters, Synergy improved again and broke her maiden, winning the race by half a length.

=== 2008 ===
More than four months later, Synergy started her three-year-old career. Back at the La Zarzuela racecourse in Madrid, Synergy reappeared in the Caja Madrid, a race over 2100 meters and a prep race for the Spanish Oaks. Synergy won again, this time by a neck from stable mate Manuelita. With this victory Synergy deserved her place in the Spanish Oaks, the Gran Premio Beaumonte over 2200 meters. On 1 June 2008 Synergy finished four and a half lengths clear of Abril, finishing half a length second to stablemate La Galerna.

After a period of six weeks Synergy reappeared on 13 July 2008 at San Sebastian. With a race over 2000 meters, Synergy started as one of the favourites. The race turned into a disaster. Synergy fell and jockey Matthias Borrego was dismounted. Abril won the race. Synergy got back up, determined to finish the race.

She came back to San Sebastian on 10 August 2008 for the Gran Premio Kutxa. Back to 2200 meters, Synergy finished fourth, again with Abril as the winner.

On 7 September 2008 Synergy was back at her home course of La Zarzuela in Madrid. In the Premio Benitez de Lugo Synergy was back at her best, winning the race with a length to Pokettas.

Synergy came back to La Zarzuela on 19 October for the Gran Premio Memorial Duque de Toledo. In this race over 2400 meters, she had to compete against colts for the first time. She finished third to Blue Ridge View and Polan.

Synergy had shown good improvement and was taken to France for the Listed Prix Solitude. Run over 1800 meters at Fontainebleau, she finished second to Rhadegunda, a filly from John Gosden's yard. Synergy was now retired for the year.

=== 2009 ===
On 26 April 2009 Synergy made her return to La Zarzuela racecourse. Now a four-year-old, she ran in the Premio Cruzcampo over 2200 meters, and finished seventh. This would be the last time Synergy appeared on a Spanish racecourse.

On 23 May 2009 Synergy travelled again to France, this time to run at Bordeaux le Bouscat in the Prix Joseph Peyrelongue, over 2400 meters. For the first time ridden by Olivier Peslier, she won the race by two and a half lengths, beating Pokettas into second for the second time.

A month later on 26 June 2009, Synergy returned to France, this time to La Teste de Buch for the Prix d'Aquitane. She was again run over 2400 meters, and again ridden by Olivier Peslier. Synergy won again. With two good results in May and June, Synergy had deserved another shot at stakes level.

On 26 July she traveled to Maisons-Laffitte Racecourse for the Listed Prix de la Pepiniere. Run over 2100 meters and with Olivier Peslier back in the saddle, Synergy finished three quarters of a length clear from Burn the Breeze, with another six lengths back to Peachmelbe in third. Synergy had now won her first stakes race.

On 23 August 2009 she travelled to Deauville for the Group 1 Prix Jean Romanet, over 2000 meters. Synergy finished fifth. Having had a successful summer campaign in France, she was given the month of September off.

She came back to France once more; on 11 November 2009 Synergy travelled to Toulouse for the Group 3 Prix Fille de l'Air, over 2100 meters. She won the race with one and a half lengths to Cavaliere and Alpine Snow in second and third. Synergy ended the season with her biggest win to date and gave her trainer a first winner at Group level.

=== 2010 ===
With connections targeting the Dubai Carnival at the start of the next year, Synergy was flown to Dubai in January 2010.
On 5 February 2010 she made her comeback in the Group 3 Cape Verdi over 1600 meters at Meydan Racecourse in Dubai. With Olivier Peslier back in the saddle, Synergy improved again to finish third, one and a half lengths behind Soneva and Aspectoflove.

After the race Synergy was found to have sustained an injury on the right front leg. With a broken fetlock, Synergy's career was cut short and she was retired from racing.

With an official Timeform rating of 108, Synergy is one of the most successful fillies that have been trained in Spain.

== Retirement ==
Synergy successfully conceived a foal by the stallion Zamindar in 2011, sold in public auction Arqana August yearling sales 2012 for €65.000 to Hautieres Bloodstock, to be trained by Yan Durepaire, named Kaskarau won 4 races in France. In her second season at stud she was covered by Soldier of Fortune, finally barren. In 2012 she was covered by Rock of Gibraltar and again was barren. In 2013 was covered by MyBoyCharlie producing a filly sold in public sales Arqana August v2 2015 bought by Sylvain Vidal in a price of €65.000 on behalf of Augustin-Normand, the filly named Gaillefontaine went to be trained by Yan Durepaire and broke her maiden at Lyon as 2yo on 30/10/2016 on her second race. In 2014 Synergy was covered by Coolmore champion Camelot and was sold on public sales Arqana December 2014 in a price of €85.000 to Anthony Stroud, this Camelot colt went to auction at Tattersalls December yearling sales, Synergy now is breeding in UK at Wood Hall Stud 14 miles North East from London City center. In 2015 Synergy was covered by Newells Park Stud stallion Nathaniel producing a February foal.
