= Synergy model of nursing =

The American Association of Critical-Care Nurses’ (AACN) developed the synergy model of patient care as a conceptual framework for their critical care nurse certification program. This midlevel nursing theory identifies core competencies necessary for critical care nurses while providing structure for the AACN certification exam .

According to the synergy model, critical care patients have specific characteristics, while nurses have specific competencies. The core concept underlying the synergy model is nurse-patient interaction as reciprocal and constantly evolving while each party responds to the characteristics and actions of the other. Synergy, or ideal patient outcomes, can be reached by matching patient needs and characteristics with appropriate nurse competencies to work towards common goals in a mutually enhancing manner.

While the premise of the synergy model is relatively simple the concepts behind the model are quite complex. The model itself consists of sixteen core concepts: eight patient characteristics and eight nurse competencies. Each of these characteristics and competencies is classified on one of three levels, ranging from minimal complexity to highly complex for patients and competent to expert for nursing.
