= Obligatory synergies =

Medical term for a type of involuntary movement of skeletal muscles

Obligatory synergies, also known as flexion and extension synergies, are abnormal and stereotypical patterns across multiple joints observed when a patient tries to make a minimal voluntary movement, or as a result of stimulated reflexes. These synergies emerge because of upregulation of diffusely projecting brainstem motor pathways following stroke-induced damage to corticofugal pathways, and in traumatic brain injury, spinal cord injury, and multiple sclerosis. They are described as either a flexion synergy or an extension synergy and can affect both the upper and lower extremities. A patient is unable to move a limb segment in isolation of the pattern, which interferes with normal activities of daily living. Some aspects of the obligatory synergy patterns however, can be cleverly used to increase function relative to the movement available to the individual. Careful thought should, therefore, be considered in deciding which muscle groups to stretch at specific times during recovery.

The flexion synergy for the upper extremity includes scapular retraction and elevation, shoulder abduction and external rotation, elbow flexion, forearm supination, and wrist and finger flexion.

The extension synergy for the upper extremity includes scapular protraction, shoulder adduction and internal rotation, elbow extension, forearm pronation, and wrist and finger flexion.

The flexion synergy for the lower extremity includes hip flexion, abduction and external rotation, knee flexion, ankle dorsiflexion and inversion and toe dorsiflexion.

The extension synergy for the lower extremity includes hip extension, adduction and internal rotation, knee extension, ankle plantar flexion and inversion, and toe plantar flexion.

Note that some muscles are not usually involved in these synergy patterns and include the lattisimus dorsi, teres major, serratus anterior, finger extensors, and ankle evertors.
