= Synergy Aircraft Synergy =

Synergy
- Artist's concept

General information
- Type: Air Mobility
- National origin: United States
- Manufacturer: DBT Aero
- Designer: John McGinnis
- Status: Under development
- Number built: None

The Synergy Aircraft Synergy is a proposed five-seat, single-engine, kit aircraft, designed by John McGinnis of Kalispell, Montana and intended for production by his company, Synergy Aircraft.

The aircraft's closed wing design, termed a "double box tail", is intended to lower induced drag and be stall resistant, along with boundary layer control methods. Many of the details are disclosed in US patent 8657226.

== Design and development ==
Development was started in 2010 to develop the Synergy as a future kit airplane. The Synergy is the first aircraft that was designed to use the 200 hp (149 kW) DeltaHawk V-4 engine. An electric-powered 1/4 scale version of the aircraft has been built and flown via radio control.

The Synergy design was unveiled at the 2011 CAFE Foundation electric aircraft symposium. The aircraft was intended to compete in the 2011 NASA/CAFE Green Flight Challenge, but its funding and engine were delayed, forcing the team to withdraw from the competition.

After receiving the DeltaHawk engine in December 2011 work resumed and a funding drive was launched to complete the prototype. Intended as a Kickstarter crowdfunding project, the initial project application and appeal were rejected on the basis of not fitting in with Kickstarter's creative arts focus. On 13 May 2012, however, Kickstarter informed McGinnis that they had reconsidered and that the project was approved. The project raised US$ 95,627 gross funds.

By mid-December 2012 McGinnis indicated that the Kickstarter campaign had raised US$80,000 and that he was intending to have a flying proof-of-concept aircraft at AirVenture 2013. He also stated that if the aircraft is not complete then he will not have a display there. The Kickstarter campaign also attracted a lot of interest, but answering email and phones calls has slowed work on the prototype down.

In May 2023 DBT Aero co-founder McGinnis was expelled from the company and replaced by Thomas Hatfield as CTO.

In July 2023 the first full scale prototype received its FAA Special Airworthiness Certificate in the experimental category which allowed to conduct flight tests.

== Specifications ==
Data from Experimental Aircraft Association and Synergy

General characteristics

- Crew: 1
- Capacity: 4 passengers
- Length: 21 ft (6.4 m)
- Wingspan: 32 ft (9.8 m)
- Wing area: 156 sq ft (14.5 m^{2})
- Empty weight: 1,650 lb (748 kg)
- Gross weight: 3,100 lb (1,406 kg)

Performancemin level flight speed

- Wing loading: 23.2 lb/sq ft (113 kg/m^{2})
