= Tastiera (horse) =

Japanese racehorse

Tastiera タスティエーラ
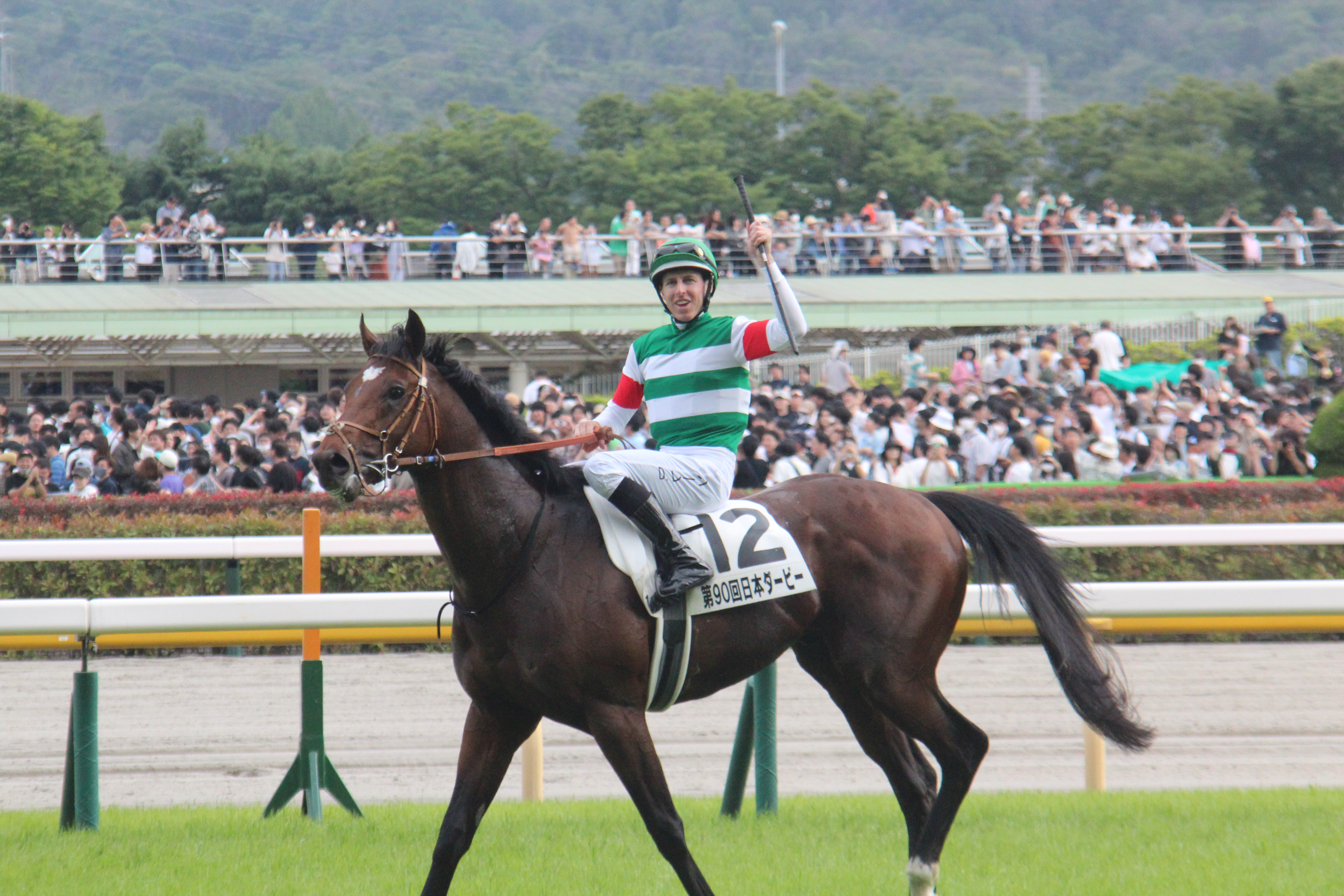
- Tastiera doing his winning run after winning the 2023 Tōkyō Yūshun
- Sire: Satono Crown
- Grandsire: Marju
- Dam: Partitura
- Damsire: Manhattan Cafe
- Sex: Colt
- Foaled: March 22, 2020 (age 6)
- Country: Japan
- Color: Bay
- Breeder: Northern Farm
- Owner: Carrot Farm Co. Ltd.
- Racing colours
- Trainer: Noriyuki Hori
- Jockey: Damian Lane
- Record: 15: 4-3-1
- Earnings: 1,059,278,900 JPY (Note: Earnings earned overseas are converted to JPY using the formula provided by JRA. 2024, 2025.); JPN: 658,977,000 JPY; HK: 20,280,000 HKD

Major wins
- Yayoi Sho (2023); Queen Elizabeth II Cup (2025); Japanese Classic Race wins: Tōkyō Yūshun (2023)

Awards
- JRA Award for Best Three-Year-Old Colt (2023)
- Last updated on August 14, 2026

Tastiera (Japanese: タスティエーラ, Hepburn: Tasutiēra; foaled March 22, 2020) is a retired Japanese Thoroughbred racehorse. His major wins include the Tōkyō Yūshun and the international Queen Elizabeth II Cup.

His name was derived from an Italian word which means "Keyboard", which is related to his Dam's name. He was awarded the JRA Award for Best Three-Year-Old Colt for 2023.

== Racing career ==
=== 2022: two-year-old season ===
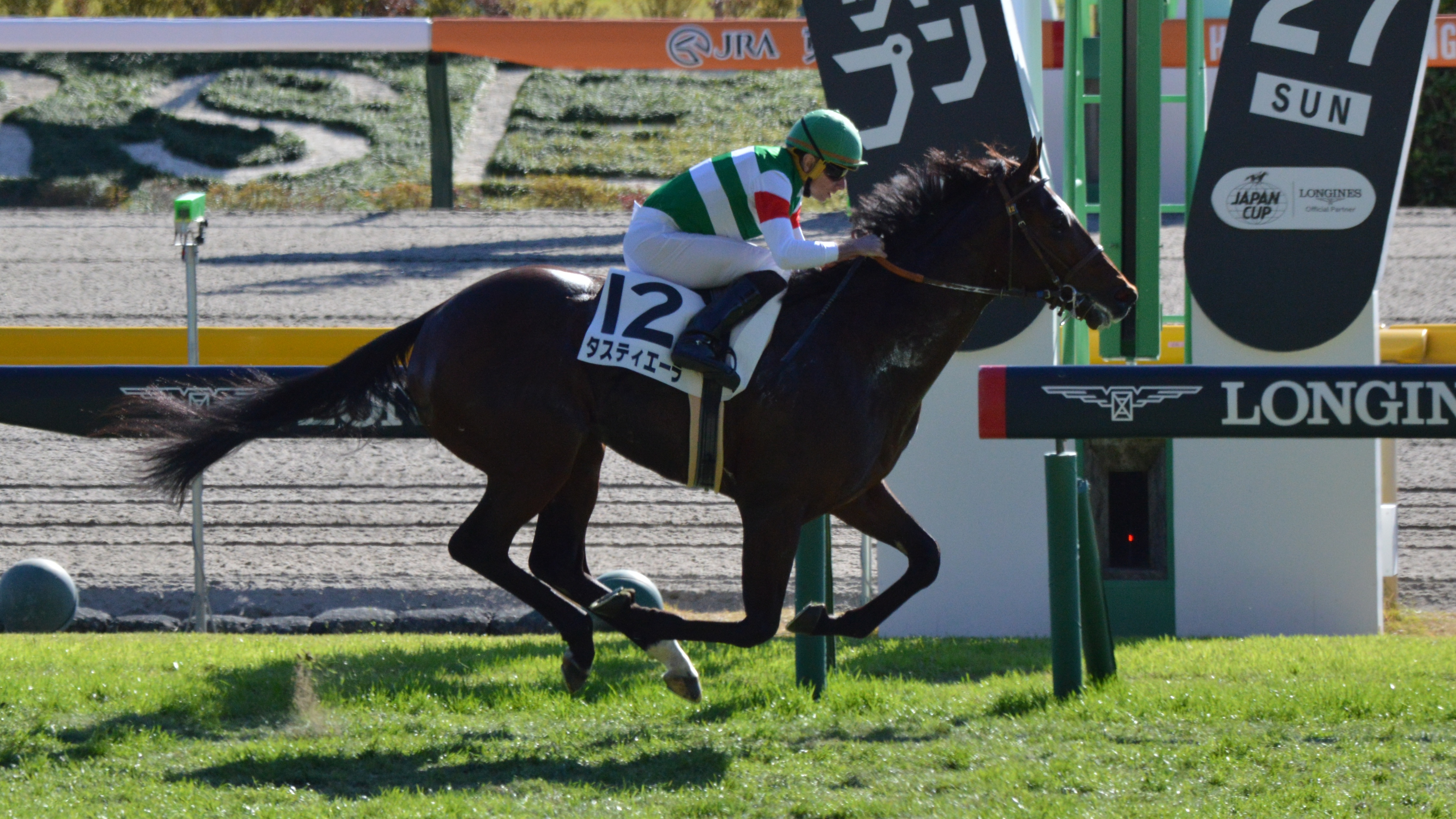
Tastiera winning his maiden race in 2022

Tastiera made his debut at the Tokyo Racecourse on November 27, 2022, in a two-year-old newcomer race on turf over 1800m. He was ridden by Ryan Moore and won the race.

=== 2023: three-year-old season ===
In Tastiera's first race of his three-year-old season, he was entered in the Kyodo Tsushin Hai on February 12 for his first Graded stakes race challenge. He was ridden by Yuichi Fukunaga and was the second most popular horse behind Danon the Tiger. He got off to a good start, and although he seemed to slow down a bit on the way, he pursued the middle group from a good position. In the straight line, he ran from the middle of the field with his quick turn of foot, closing in on the group up front, but he fell just short and placed 4th behind the winner Phantom Thief. He was entered in the Yayoi Sho for his next race, held at the Nakayama Racecourse on March 5. Kohei Matsuyama was in the saddle this time following Yuichi's retirement. He maintained a good position throughout the race, and in the final straight he took the lead early and pushed through, gaining a one-length lead over Top Knife, who pushed through the inside, and winning his first graded stakes race. This was the first graded stakes race won by a Satono Crown offspring.

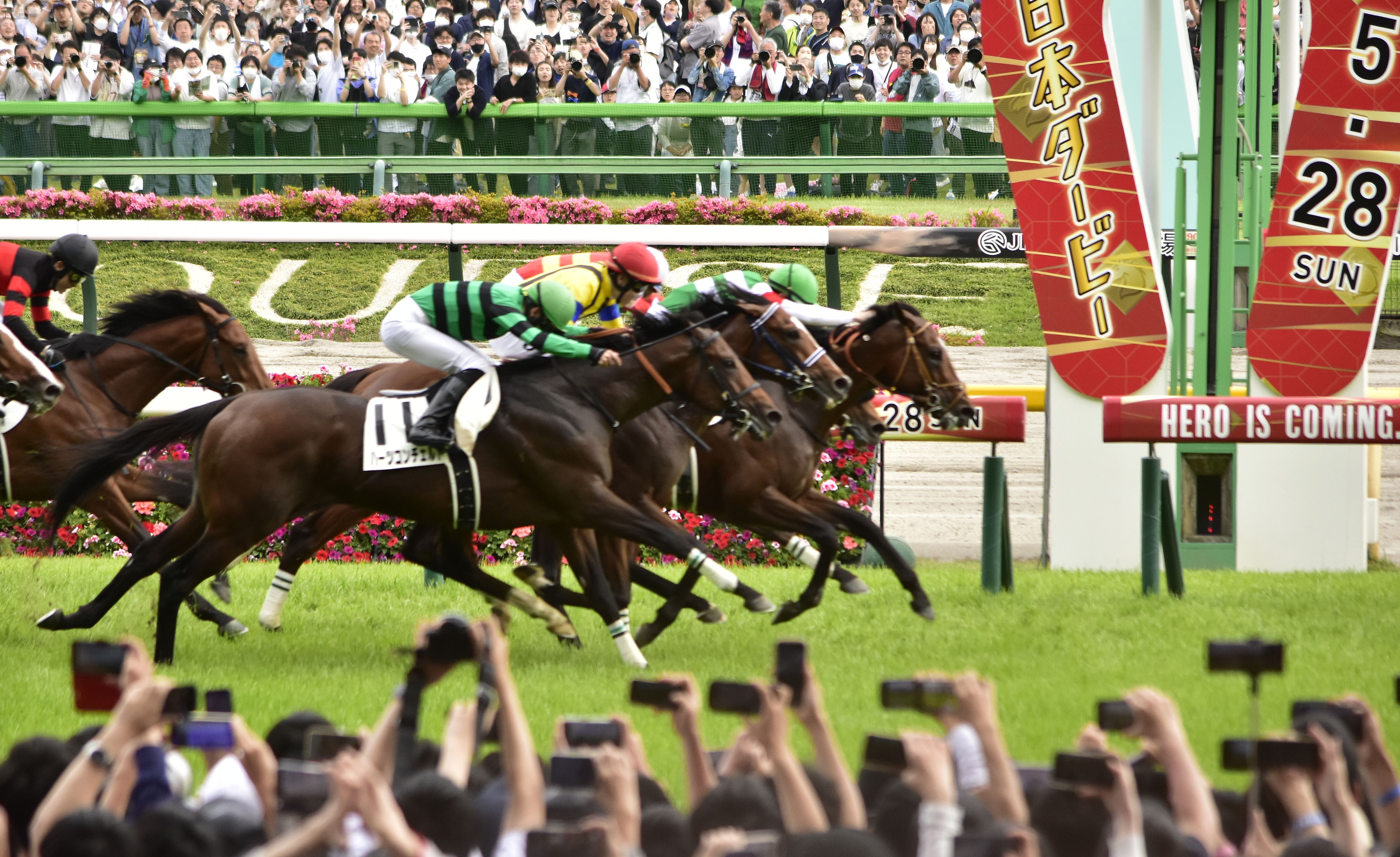
Tastiera winning the 2023 Tōkyō Yūshun

His next race was the Satsuki Shō (Japanese 2000 Guineas) on April 16, the first leg of the Japanese Triple Crown, at the same racecourse as his previous race. He drew gate number 14 and was the 5th most favorite horse behind the Kyodo Tsushin Hai winner Phantom Thief, Keisei Hai winner Sol Oriens, Spring Stakes winner Bellagio Opera, and Kisaragi Sho winner Hrimfaxi. He maintained a good position near the front in the race and approached from the outside at the final corner, and at one point completely broke through and took the lead by two lengths, but Sol Oriens caught him late from the outside, leaving him in 2nd place. After the race, his jockey Kohei said,"I was able to place him in a good position and with a good rhythm. He traveled well throughout the track. It was frustrating because it was just a few strides away, but he did a good job. There's a lot to look forward to.''

On May 7th, it was announced that he would run the Tōkyō Yūshun (Japanese Derby) as his next race. Since Kohei Matsuyama had a prior commitment with Aoba Sho runner-up Hearts Concerto, he was to be ridden by Damian Lane instead.

External videos
- 2023 東京優駿 レース映像 jraofficial（JRA公式YouTubeチャンネル）による動画

On May 28th, the day of Tōkyō Yūshun, he was the 4th most favorite behind Satsuki Sho winner Sol Oriens, Aoba Sho winner Skilfing, and Phantom Thief. He also drew gate number 12 prior and will run from that position. He maintained a good position from the start, moved upfront after the final corner into the straight, and broke away with the lead around 200m left, entering the finish line winning the race before the late charges of Sol Oriens, Hearts Concierto, and Bellagio Opera. This marked his first GI victory, and he topped all the 7,708 thoroughbreds produced or imported to Japan in 2020. With this, Satono Crown has produced his first Derby horse in his first year as a stallion. This is the first time in 69 years since Golden Wave in 1954 that a jockey who has never ridden the winning horse prior has won the Derby. This marks Damian Lane's first Japanese Derby victory, while for the horse's owner, Carrot Farm, it is their second victory, following Rey de Oro in 2017. This is the third consecutive Japanese derby victory for a horse bred by Northern Farm, following Shahryar and Do Deuce, and also their third consecutive G1 victory in 2023 following Victoria Mile (Songline) and Yushun Himba (Liberty Island).

In July, it was announced that Tastiera would race in the final leg of the classic, the Kikuka Sho in October. This race would pit him against Sol Oriens for the third time after the previous two legs. He would be partnered with Joao Moreira this time around. This news meant that he would be jockeyed by three different jockeys for all three classic races (Matsuyama in the Satsuki Sho and Lane in the Tokyo Yushun). As a preparation for the race, Hori did not push him so much from summer to the training camp. Since he skipped all the prep races for this third leg, he was fresh and ran excellently in the drills. When the race started, Tastiera settled in the ninth position inside the pack before turning wide into the backstretch. At the final corner, he turned side-by-side alongside Sol Oriens into the homestretch to catch up to the leaders. He unleashed the second-fastest late kick but failed to threaten the winner in a three-and-a-half-length runner-up effort behind the winner, Durezza. Moreira reflected on that race by saying the horse was calm, the strategy was followed and the spaces to run was open. It was just the winning horse is too strong to catch on that day. One week after this race, Carrot Club decided that Tastiera would focus his winter campaign domestically and would not accept any foreign race invitation. This was aligned with the future announcement that Tastiera would run in the Arima Kinen in December, with his debut jockey, Ryan Moore. In the final workout, Hori said that the horse was eating better, gaining more strength, and showing excellent form in training, which was applauded by the rest of the teams. Like the previous race, Moore positioned the horse in ninth position in the early part. Reaching the third corner, Moore urged the horse to drive forward but met traffic at 200 metres mark before the line. The horse lost momentum and ended up in sixth place. Moore noted that the conditions were great for both track and horse; the pace was slightly slow in the middle, which affected his rhythm; and the horse did not perform well in the final straight because he was gassed and used all his legs beforehand. At the end of the year, Tastiera was awarded the best three-year-old colt of the year by JRA.

=== 2024: four-year-old season ===
Tastiera resumed his career this year at the Osaka Hai in April alongside Matsuyama as his jockey. In training, Hori said that the horse was too relaxed as he did not fully push him in training. Despite that, he claimed that the horse is almost fully fit for the race. In the race, Tastiera mostly hugged the inside lane in fourth position, shifted outward slightly after entering the lane to make bid for the win, but the horse was outpaced and gradually fell back in the last 200 metres to finish 11th. Matsuyama said post-race, "The start was good, and the position during the race was also good. We were able to run a good race, but I'm sorry. This horse doesn't usually lose by this much...", emphasis on his frustration by the way they fell back in the final straight. At the end of April, the horse would run in the Tenno Sho (Spring). Unlike previous training, Hori put in serious workouts for him this time around and felt that there was an improvement in the quality of his movement. Hori also explained that the loss in Osaka Hai previously might have come from his poor appetite post-transport, since 80% of his feed was left uneaten. This situation prompted Hori to be extra careful as he would adjust the horse appropriately for upcoming races. On race day, Moreira, who took the reins this time, placed the horse in ninth position along the way. The horse gradually made headway near the end but lacked the finishing kick to improve and ended up in seventh behind the winner, T O Royal. Moreira confirmed that the race went well for the horse but admitted that they could not extend as much as they thought in the end. The horse was given a break and sent to pasture for the time being, as they waited to see whether he was fit for the Takarazuka Kinen or not when the time came..

Eventually, he skipped that race and continued to rest until the second half started. The next race for him would be at the Tenno Sho (Autumn) in October. The team switched his jockey once more, as he went with Matsuyama in this race. Hori noted about his training, "He took the bit on his own and pulled ahead, showing good responsiveness and extending his stride. His breathing is poor, so hopefully this workout will get him in shape. On race day, Tastiera secured a good start and positioned himself in fourth place. He slightly angled out when taking the last corners and further stamped his position on the outside track in the final straight. He overtook every single front-running horse except one, Do Deuce, and finished half a length behind him in second place. Matsuyama quoted on his comeback performance, "The horse had a good feel and a good start. There was no tension during the race, and it ran at a good rhythm. It stretched out at the end and came very close, but the winning horse's finishing kick got the better of it. I'm disappointed that I couldn't get the result when I was given another chance, but it showed its ability. This horse can do even better." This performance was considered good enough, as the team accepted the international invitation to the Hong Kong Cup race in December. For his first international, he trained alongside fellow compatriot who would join the Hong Kong Sprint, Satono Reve and edged him to the finish line by half a length. His groom, Takahashi, remarked that his movement was flawless and he was in good condition physically and mentally. In the race, he had a fierce duel along the way alongside the local horse, Romantic Warrior and kept changing position between first and second. In the final straight, Romantic Warrior spurted away and another Japanese horse, Liberty Island overtook him before the line as he finished in third place that day. Lane, who rode him this time stated that Tastiera ran great and got up to the speed. It was just a few fresher horses that beat him in the end.

=== 2025: five-year-old season ===
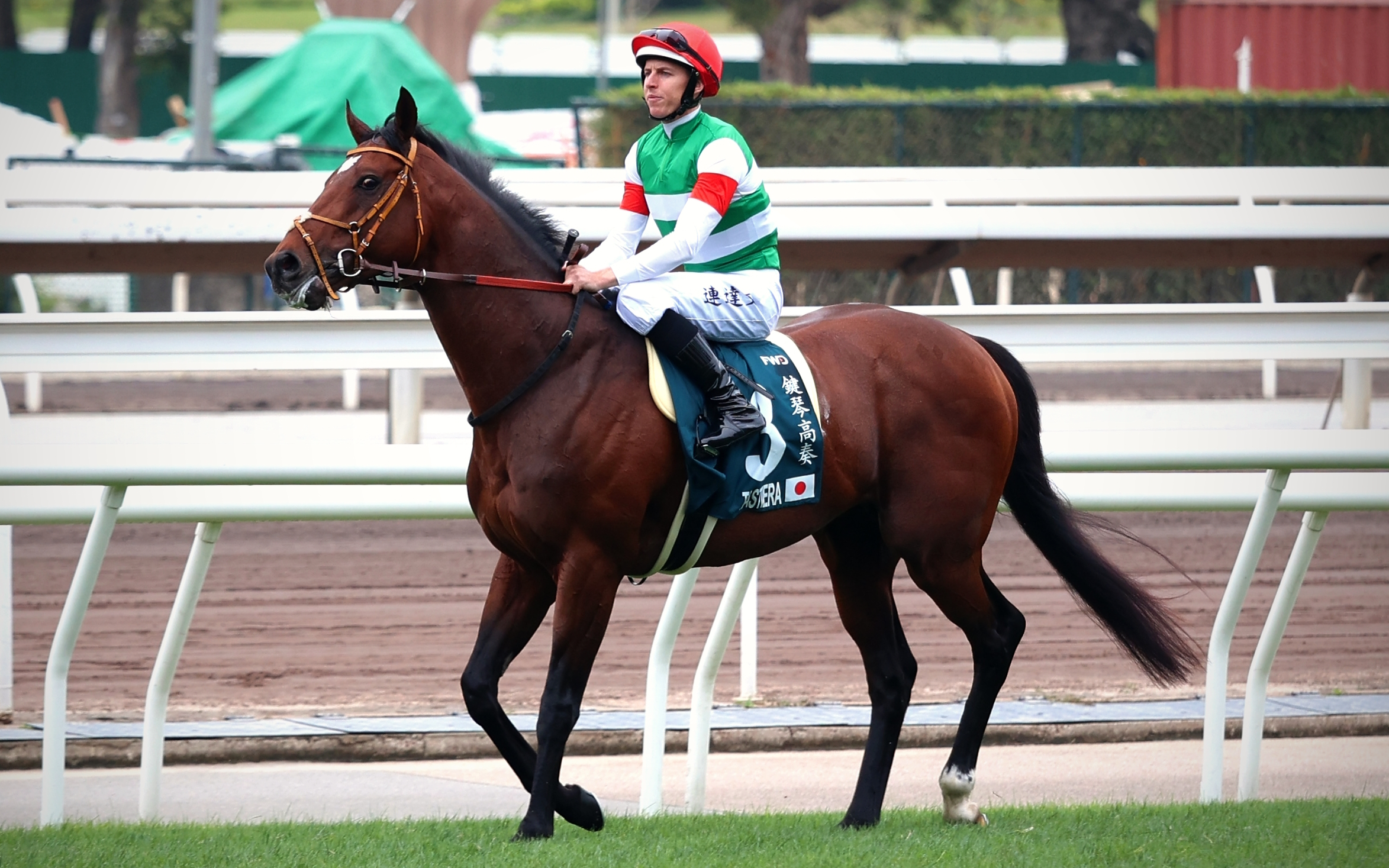
Tastiera at the 2025 Queen Elizabeth II Cup

In April, Tastiera started his campaign with another Hong Kong race. This time, He would join the Queen Elizabeth II Cup race alongside two fellow compatriots, Prognosis and Liberty Island. Lane would continue his task of jockeying the horse for the race. In the final workout, the horse showed his relaxed demeanour as he recorded a steady time for four furlongs. His groom, Takahashi, confirmed that the horse was calm, that the response and race rhythm were exactly as intended, and that everything was going smoothly. Lane and Tastiera were drawn to start from gate 10 on the day of the race. When the gates opened, he broke swiftly from the gate and settled into fourth position in the back straight as New Zealand star El Vencedor carved out the early tractions under Zac Purton. While Lane maintained a prominent position, fancied runners Goliath, Liberty Island and Prognosis were forced to settle further towards the rear in a steadily run race. The horse travelled up strongly to the quarters of El Vencedor and Cap Ferrat at the head of the home straight and soon skated into a clear lead. He led the race to the home, one-and-three-quarters lengths ahead of Prognosis, who finished second. After the race, Lane praised how great the horse was and how massive this win for the Carrot Farm, as he also expressed his gratitude and privilege on riding Tastiera that day. This win marked his first overseas G1 win and also repeated his sire's feat in Hong Kong when Satono Crown won the 2016 Hong Kong Vase.

External videos
- FWD Champions Day 2025 | FWD QEII Cup Race Replay

Tastiera returned home on 30 April and underwent equine quarantine at Miki Horse Land Park in Hyogo. After that, he went back to Northern Park and rested until he was confirmed to join the Tenno Sho (Autumn) in early November. Before the race, Hori claimed that the horse stretched out well, but his running form was declining a bit due to the horse's inability to use his body properly during training. In the race, Lane propelled him to the fifth position at the start and maintained the pace. In the final straight, he even overtook the front-running horse, Meisho Tabaru, in the final 300 metres, before weakening in the final 150 metres and ending up in eighth place at the line. Lane, who was fully dejected, said after the race, "The pace was slow, so I made my move early, but that caused his legs to tire. It wasn't the best pace for this horse." Hori decided that Tastiera's next race would be the Japan Cup and stayed with Lane as his jockey. Despite there being some considerations for another Hong Kong Cup try, they would focus on the domestic campaign first at the end of this season. In the final workout, Hori inspected that there were no problems with the horse's appetite, health, or legs after the race and found that he recovered in only 11 days after his previous race. Starting from the outermost gate, Tastiera was buried in the middle pack for the majority of the race, accelerated in the mid final stretch, competed for the lead for awhile before gassed out 100 metres from the line and finished in seventh place behind the first overseas' winner in 20 years, Calandagan. In the post race interview, Lane said that the horse had good rhythm and pace throughout. There were some moments when he was losing concentration, but he successfully reconstructed his momentum again and gave his all at the finish.

It was confirmed that his final race of the season would be the Arima Kinen in December. For this assignment, it would be Matsuyama who would replace Lane as his jockey. Hori said the extensive autumn schedule did not affect the horse, as his breathing was good, his physical condition was fresh, and he was energetic in training. For the second successive race, he was drawn to start from the outermost gate. Hori reacted to this by saying, "He also drew the outermost gate in the Japan Cup, so I want to make the most of that experience. I want to get him in top form before the race." On a fine Sunday, Tastiera bolted early and positioned himself in third. Nearing the final straight, he entered the right lane that suited him for a strike at the win. He ran gamely until he was exhausted in the final 100 metres. Tastiera finished in sixth place behind the winner, Museum Mile. Speaking after the race, Matsuyama saw promises in his run today but disappointed that he could not gave a better result in his final race. He was retired from racing, deregistered from the horse registry and moved to stud duty at Yushun Stallion Station in Niikappu, Hokkaido.

== Racing statistics ==
Below data is based on data available on JBIS Search, netkeiba.com, and the Hong Kong Jockey Club.

Date	Track	Race	Grade	Distance (Condition)	Entry	HN	Odds (Favored)	Finish	Time	Margin	Jockey	Winner (Runner-up)
2022 – two-year-old season
Nov 27	Tokyo	Maiden race		1,800 m (Firm)	16	12	1.9 (1)	1st	1:47.2	-0.6	Ryan Moore	(La Reine des Lys)
2023 – three-year-old season
Feb 12	Tokyo	Kyodo Tsushin Hai	3	1,800 m (Firm)	12	6	3.7 (2)	4th	1:47.2	0.2	Yuichi Fukunaga	Phantom Thief
Mar 5	Nakayama	Yayoi Sho	2	2,000 m (Firm)	10	6	4.2 (2)	1st	2:00.4	-0.2	Kohei Matsuyama	(Top Knife)
Apr 16	Nakayama	Satsuki Shō	1	2,000 m (Soft)	18	14	9.0 (5)	2nd	2:00.8	0.2	Kohei Matsuyama	Sol Oriens
May 28	Tokyo	Tōkyō Yūshun	1	2,400 m (Firm)	18	12	8.3 (4)	1st	2:25.2	0.0	Damian Lane	(Sol Oriens)
Oct 22	Kyoto	Kikuka-shō	1	3,000 m (Firm)	17	7	4.7 (2)	2nd	3:03.7	0.6	João Moreira	Durezza
Dec 24	Nakayama	Arima Kinen	1	2,500 m (Firm)	16	13	7.1 (5)	6th	2:31.5	0.6	Ryan Moore	Do Deuce
2024 – four-year-old season
Mar 31	Hanshin	Ōsaka Hai	1	2,000 m (Firm)	16	3	4.4 (1)	11th	1:58.9	0.7	Kohei Matsuyama	Bellagio Opera
Apr 28	Kyoto	Tenno Sho (Spring)	1	3,200 m (Firm)	18	7	7.9 (4)	7th	3:15.0	0.8	João Moreira	T O Royal
Oct 27	Tokyo	Tenno Sho (Fall)	1	2,000 m (Firm)	15	4	53.8 (9)	2nd	1:57.5	0.2	Kohei Matsuyama	Do Deuce
Dec 8	Sha Tin	Hong Kong Cup	1	2,000 m (Good)	11	4	14.0 (3)	3rd	2:00.97	0.46	Damian Lane	Romantic Warrior
2025 – five-year-old season
Apr 27	Sha Tin	QE II Cup	1	2,000 m (Good)	11	3	3.7 (2)	1st	2:00.51	-0.29	Damian Lane	(Prognosis)
Nov 2	Tokyo	Tenno Sho (Fall)	1	2,000 m (Firm)	14	5	6.6 (2)	8th	1:59.0	0.4	Damian Lane	Masquerade Ball
Nov 30	Tokyo	Japan Cup	1	2,400 m (Firm)	18	18	17.4 (6)	7th	2:21.1	0.8	Damian Lane	Calandagan
Dec 28	Nakayama	Arima Kinen	1	2,500 m (Firm)	16	16	35.4 (8)	6th	2:32.0	0.5	Kohei Matsuyama	Museum Mile

Legend:
Turf

== Pedigree ==
Pedigree of Tastiera (JPN), bay colt, 2020
Sire Satono Crown dk.b. 2012	Marju (IRE) dk.b. 1988	Last Tycoon	Try My Best (USA)
Sire Satono Crown dk.b. 2012	Marju (IRE) dk.b. 1988	Last Tycoon	Mill Princess
Sire Satono Crown dk.b. 2012	Marju (IRE) dk.b. 1988	Flame of Tara	Artaius (USA)
Sire Satono Crown dk.b. 2012	Marju (IRE) dk.b. 1988	Flame of Tara	Welsh Flame (GB)
Sire Satono Crown dk.b. 2012	Jioconda (IRE) b. 2003	Rossini (USA)	Miswaki
Sire Satono Crown dk.b. 2012	Jioconda (IRE) b. 2003	Rossini (USA)	Touch of Greatness
Sire Satono Crown dk.b. 2012	Jioconda (IRE) b. 2003	La Joconde (GB)	Vettori (IRE)
Sire Satono Crown dk.b. 2012	Jioconda (IRE) b. 2003	La Joconde (GB)	Lust
Dam Partitura dk.b. 2014	Manhattan Cafe br. 1998	Sunday Silence (USA)	Halo
Dam Partitura dk.b. 2014	Manhattan Cafe br. 1998	Sunday Silence (USA)	Wishing Well
Dam Partitura dk.b. 2014	Manhattan Cafe br. 1998	Subtle Change (IRE)	Law Society (USA)
Dam Partitura dk.b. 2014	Manhattan Cafe br. 1998	Subtle Change (IRE)	Santa Luciana (GER)
Dam Partitura dk.b. 2014	Fortepiano ch. 2003	French Deputy (USA)	Deputy Minister (CAN)
Dam Partitura dk.b. 2014	Fortepiano ch. 2003	French Deputy (USA)	Mitterand
Dam Partitura dk.b. 2014	Fortepiano ch. 2003	Kyoei Forte	Northern Taste (CAN)
Dam Partitura dk.b. 2014	Fortepiano ch. 2003	Kyoei Forte	Crafty Wife (USA) (Family: 9)

- Kyoei Forte's older brother is Big Shori (Miler's Cup), and her younger brother is Big Taste (Nakayama Grand Jump).
- Other close relatives include Company (Tenno Sho Autumn, Mile Championship), Tosen Jordan (Tenno Sho Autumn), and Tosen Stardom (VRC Champion Stakes, Toorak Handicap), via Crafty Wife's damline.
