= Prix Fille de l'Air =

Flat horse race in France

- Class: Group 3
- Location: Toulouse Racecourse; Toulouse, France
- Inaugurated: 1902
- Race type: Flat / Thoroughbred
- Website: france-galop.com

Race information
- Distance: 2,100 metres (1m 2½f)
- Surface: Turf
- Track: Right-handed
- Qualification: Three-years-old and up fillies and mares exc. G2 winners this or last year
- Weight: 54½ kg (3yo); 56 kg (4yo+); Penalties; 3 kg for Group 3 winners * * since January 1
- Purse: €80,000 (2021); 1st: €40,000

Prix Fille de l'Air
2023
Perama	Une Perle	Hardpia

Previous years
2022
Via Sistina	Winema	Pennine Hills
2020
Directa	All Rumours	Dariyza
2019
Ambition	Vespera	Tosen Gift
2018
Gaining	Son Macia	Tosen Gift
2017
Haggle	Son Macia	Via Firenze
2016
Powder Snow	Restiana	Rosental
2015
Taniya	Five Fifteen	Lady Of Kyushu
2014
Gaga	Peut Etre	Heartily
2013
Frine	Glowing Cloud	Gaga
2012
Casaca	Baino Rock	Brasileira
2011
Skia	Skallet	Casaca

2010-2001
2010
Ma Preference	La Boum	Kartica
2009
Synergy	Cavaliere	Alpine Snow
2008
La Boum	Rainbow Dancing	Folle Allure
2007
Tashelka	Doe Ray Me	Synopsis
2006
Afaf	In Clover	Sanaya
2005
Antioquia	Russian Hill	Amie De Mix
2004
Linda Regina	Delightful Sofie	Tocopilla
2003
Walkamia	Monturani	Handria
2002
Dance Dress	Almond Mousse	Queen Of Persia
2001
Goncharova	Side Of Paradise	La Cibeles

2000-1991
2000
Aiglonne	Limelighting	Nadira
1999
Neptune's Bride	Intuition	Bela-M
1998
Just In Fun	Snow Polina	Sensitivity
1997
Yvecrique	Seigniorage	Sensitivity
1996
Maroussie	Dance Treat	Restiv Star
1995
Marie De Ken	Restiv Star	Daraydala
1994
Hollywood Dream	L'Ile Tidy	Girl From Ipanema
1993
Royale Chantou	Ring Pink	Apogee
1992
Halesia	On Credit	Lupescu
1991
Fabulous Hostess	On Credit	La Tirana

1990-1988
1990
Savoureuse Lady	Indica	Anna's Honor
1989
Solveig	Summer Trip	Barb's Slew
1988
Mystery Rays	Asl	Princesse Du Bourg

The Prix Fille de l'Air is a Group 3 flat horse race in France open to thoroughbred fillies and mares aged three years or older. It is run at Toulouse over a distance of 2,100 metres (about 1 mile and 2½ furlongs), and it is scheduled to take place each year in November.

== History ==
The event is named after Fille de l'Air, a successful French-trained filly in the 1860s. It was established in 1902, and was originally held at Maisons-Laffitte. It was initially contested over 2,400 metres, and was extended to 2,600 metres in 1906. It reverted to its former length in 1913, and was cut to 2,000 metres the following year.

Due to World War I, the race was abandoned from 1915 to 1919. It was transferred to Saint-Cloud in 1921, and restored to 2,400 metres in 1924. It was shortened to 2,100 metres in 1929.

The Prix Fille de l'Air was cancelled twice during World War II, in 1940 and 1941. It was staged at Longchamp in 1942, Le Tremblay in 1943 and Auteuil in 1944. It was held at Longchamp again in 1945, and returned to Saint-Cloud in 1946.

The present system of race grading was introduced in 1971, and the Prix Fille de l'Air was classed at Group 3 level. For a period it took place in June.

The race was moved to late October in 1990, and to November in 1991. It took place at Évry in 1995 and 1996. It was transferred to Toulouse in 1997, and since then it has been usually run on the French public holiday of Armistice Day.

== Records ==
Most successful horse (2 wins):

- Punta Gorda – 1906, 1907
- Ahohoney – 1984, 1985
- Ambition - 2019, 2021

Leading jockey (4 wins):

- Alfred Gibert – Kalinia (1969), Miss Dan (1970), Sybarite (1973), Irena (1975)

Leading trainer (4 wins):

- Charles Defeyer – Quoi (1924), Larsy (1928), Rollybuchy (1929), Mascotte (1942)
- François Boutin – Satu (1968), Snow Day (1981), Liastra (1986), Mystery Rays (1988)
- André Fabre – Savoureuse Lady (1990), Dance Dress (2002), Walkamia (2003), Tashelka (2007)

Leading owner (4 wins):

- Marcel Boussac – Pharelle (1945), Caraida (1955), Arbela (1961), Artania (1963)

== Winners since 1979 ==
Year	Winner	Age	Jockey	Trainer	Owner	Time
1979	Tintagel	4	Henri Samani	J. R. Lyon	Marietta Fox-Pitt	2:18.20
1980	Detroit	3	Alain Lequeux	Olivier Douieb	Robert Sangster	2:12.70
1981	Snow Day	3	Philippe Paquet	François Boutin	Robert Sangster	2:13.10
1982	Sham's Princess	3	Alain Lequeux	Olivier Douieb	Leslie Combs II	2:12.00
1983	Darine	5	Yves Saint-Martin	Robert Collet	Turki Saud	2:15.80
1984	Ahohoney	3	Maurice Philipperon	J. C. Cunnington	Countess Batthyany	2:11.40
1985	Ahohoney	4	Alain Badel	J. C. Cunnington	Countess Batthyany	2:13.00
1986	Liastra	3	Cash Asmussen	François Boutin	Peter Goulandris
1987	Khariyda	3	Yves Saint-Martin	Alain de Royer-Dupré	HH Aga Khan IV	2:17.00
1988	Mystery Rays	3	Gérald Mossé	François Boutin	Stavros Niarchos	2:07.40
1989	Solveig	3	Guy Guignard	Criquette Head	Jacques Wertheimer	2:20.50
1990	Savoureuse Lady	3	Cash Asmussen	André Fabre	Paul de Moussac	2:23.10
1991	Fabulous Hostess	3	Guy Guignard	Criquette Head	Jacques Wertheimer	2:26.20
1992	Halesia	3	Dominique Boeuf	Élie Lellouche	Enrique Sarasola	2:34.00
1993	Royale Chantou	3	Cash Asmussen	John Hammond	Sultan Al Kabeer	2:24.20
1994	Hollywood Dream	3	John Reid	Uwe Ostmann	Gestüt Ittlingen	2:26.60
1995	Marie de Ken	3	Sylvain Guillot	Alain de Royer-Dupré	Ecurie Bader	2:16.82
1996	Maroussie	3	Jean-Michel Breux	Nicolas Clément	Jean-François Malle	2:20.45
1997	Yvecrique	3	Thierry Gillet	Jean-Pierre Gauvin	Pierrette Fargier	2:21.90
1998	Just in Fun	4	Andre Best	Hans Blume	Gestüt Sommerberg	2:17.10
1999	Neptune's Bride	3	Sylvain Guillot	Henri-Alex Pantall	Sheikh Mohammed	2:08.60
2000	Aiglonne	3	Goulven Toupel	Henri-Alex Pantall	Mrs Paul de Moussac	2:11.80
2001	Goncharova	3	Kieren Fallon	Sir Michael Stoute	Magnier / Tabor	2:11.10
2002	Dance Dress	3	Christophe Soumillon	André Fabre	Khalid Abdullah	2:22.37
2003	Walkamia	3	Christophe Soumillon	André Fabre	Lagardère Family	2:10.60
2004	Linda Regina	3	Ronan Thomas	Criquette Head-Maarek	G. Borges Torrealba	2:22.94
2005	Antioquia	4	Miguel Blancpain	Carlos Laffon-Parias	Felipe Hinojosa	2:09.78
2006	Afaf	4	Thierry Jarnet	Mikel Delzangles	Zakaria Hakam	2:13.79
2007	Tashelka	3	Johan Victoire	André Fabre	Sheikh Mohammed	2:10.74
2008	La Boum	5	Thierry Jarnet	Robert Collet	Emmanuel Trussardi	2:17.52
2009	Synergy	4	Olivier Peslier	Yan Durepaire	De La Fuente Stud	2:22.52
2010	Ma Preference	4	Stéphane Pasquier	François Rohaut	Patrick Chedeville	2:22.43
2011	Skia	4	Anthony Crastus	Carlos Laffon-Parias	Leonidas Marinopoulos	2:11.83
2012	Casaca	6	Jeremy Crocquevieille	Juan Miguel Osorio	Africa Cuadra-Lores	2:15.60
2013	Frine	3	Jeremy Crocquevieille	Juan Miguel Osorio	Duke of Alburquerque	2:19.49
2014	Gaga A	5	Alexis Badel	David Smaga	Benjamin Steinbruch	2:13.70
2015	Taniya	3	Alexis Badel	Jean-Claude Rouget	HH Aga Khan	2:13.81
2016	Powder Snow	3	Aurelien Lemaitre	Henri-Alex Pantall	Godolphin	2:15.25
2017	Haggle	4	Pierre-Charles Boudot	Henri-François Devin	Mme R Hillen	2:11.38
2018	Gaining	4	Vincent Cheminaud	Henri-François Devin	Khalid Abdullah	2:16.00
2019	Ambition	3	Mickael Barzalona	Xavier Thomas-Demeaulte	James Rowsell & Steve Ashley	2:18.90
2020	Directa	3	Theo Bachelot	Joel Boisnard	Maryvonne Blot	2:11.70
2021	Ambition	5	Mickael Barzalona	Xavier Thomas-Demeaulte	James Rowsell & Steve Ashley	2:12.80
2022	Via Sistina	4	Jamie Spencer	George Boughey	Mme R Hillen	2:09.40
2023	Perama	3	Theo Bachelot	Francois Rohaut	Ecurie Des Charmes	2:16.10
2024	Higher Leaves	3	Alexis Pouchin	Henry de Bromhead	James Wigan	2:11.60
2025	Weltbeste	3	Martin Seidl	Maxim Pecheur	Gestut Rottgen	2:13.40

== Earlier winners ==
- 1902: Reine des Fleurs
- 1903: La Camargo
- 1904: Sofia
- 1905: Luzerne
- 1906: Punta Gorda
- 1907: Punta Gorda
- 1908: Mafia II
- 1909: Messaouda
- 1910: Ma Cherie
- 1911: Basse Pointe
- 1912: Tripolette
- 1913: Ardeche
- 1914: Rivista
- 1915–19: no race
- 1920: Maskara
- 1921: Herlies
- 1922: Finetta
- 1923: Solange
- 1924: Quoi
- 1925: Lotus Lily
- 1926: Briseis
- 1927: La Desirade
- 1928: Larsy
- 1929: Rollybuchy
- 1930: Merveille
- 1931: Halston
- 1932: Sans Rancune
- 1933: Arabia
- 1934: Anatolie
- 1935: Blue Bell
- 1936: Pamina
- 1937: Cosquilla
- 1938: Adieu
- 1939: Pereire
- 1940–41: no race
- 1942: Mascotte
- 1943: Lady Cast
- 1944: Orthez
- 1945: Pharelle
- 1946: Plouvien
- 1947: Fair Eire
- 1948: Chez Elle
- 1949:
- 1950:
- 1951: Hero
- 1952:
- 1953: Radio
- 1954: Reine d'Atout
- 1955: Caraida
- 1956: Resabiada
- 1957: Fussy
- 1958: Denisy
- 1959: Ornifle
- 1960: Rivesarthe
- 1961: Arbela
- 1962: Nebalie
- 1963: Artania
- 1964: Arnica
- 1965: Dame de la Cour
- 1966: Nursery Song
- 1967: Cranberry Sauce
- 1968: Satu
- 1969: Kalinia
- 1970: Miss Dan
- 1971: Azella
- 1972: Northern Tavern
- 1973: Sybarite
- 1974: Premiere Harde
- 1975: Irena
- 1976: Gramy
- 1977: Silver Bells
- 1978: Twilight Hour

== See also ==
- List of French flat horse races
