= Drefong =

American Thoroughbred racehorse

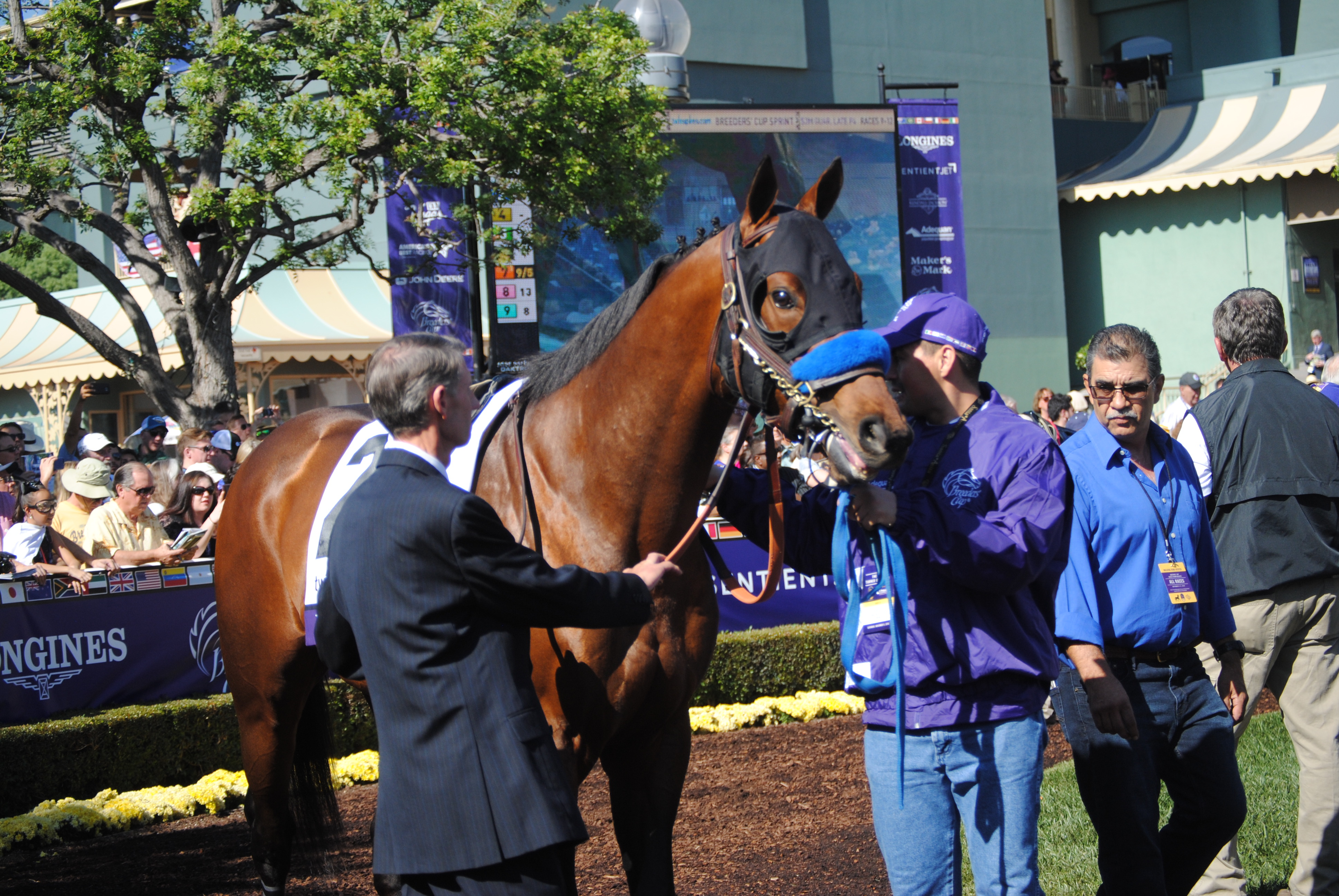
- Drefong at the BC Sprint
- Sire: Gio Ponti
- Grandsire: Tale of the Cat
- Dam: Eltimaas
- Damsire: Ghostzapper
- Sex: Stallion
- Foaled: 19 February 2013
- Country: United States
- Colour: Bay
- Breeder: Frederick M. Allor, Michael T. Barnett, Anthony M. Warrender
- Owner: Baoma Corporation
- Trainer: Bob Baffert
- Record: 9: 6-0-0
- Earnings: $1,538,385

Major wins
- King's Bishop Stakes (2016); Forego Stakes (2017) Breeders' Cup wins: Breeders' Cup Sprint (2016)

Awards
- American Champion Sprint Horse (2016)
- Last updated on November 11, 2017

Drefong (foaled February 19, 2013) is a Thoroughbred racehorse and sire who was named the American Champion Sprint Horse at age three after winning the King's Bishop Stakes and Breeders' Cup Sprint. He also won the Forego Stakes at age four.

== Background ==
Drefong is a bay horse sired by three-time Eclipse Award winner Gio Ponti, who was best known as a route runner on the turf, but also finished second to Zenyatta in the Breeders' Cup Classic. Drefong is from Gio Ponti's first crop, which also included Queen's Plate winner Sir Dudly Digges. His dam Eltimaas is an unraced daughter of Ghostzapper, who won races such as the Met Mile, Woodward, and Breeders' Cup Classic. Eltimaas is a half-sister to juvenile champion Action This Day.

Drefong was sold as a weanling in November 2013 for $200,000 at the Keeneland Sales, then was resold as a yearling for $450,000. He is the first racehorse owned by Charlie Chu's Baoma Corporation. Drefong is trained by Hall of Famer Bob Baffert, who helped pick out the colt at the sales based on his excellent conformation.

== Racing career ==
=== 2015: Two-year-old season ===
Drefong began his two-year-old-season on October 24, 2015, in a Maiden Special Weight at Santa Anita Park at a distance of 5 1/2 furlongs. He lost ground when he missed the start, made an "eye-catching" move to gain position, but then ducked in at the sixteenth pole fell back to finish fifth. He made his next start at Del Mar on November 14, going off as the 5-2 second choice. He went straight to the lead while setting fast early fractions, then pulled away down the stretch to win by 8 3/4 lengths. The impressive victory earned the colt the "TDN Rising Star" designation for Thoroughbred Daily News.

=== 2016: Three-year-old season ===
To start off his sophomore season, Drefong ran in a six-furlong allowance optional claimer at Santa Anita on May 30, 2016, against older horses. Drefong broke well and battled for the lead with Saint of Saints to his inside and Gutsy Ruler to the outside. The three completed the first quarter-mile in an exceptionally fast 21.43 seconds, after which Saint of Saints gave way. Gutsy Ruler continued to challenge through a half mile run in 44.12 until he too started to drop back. Drefong continued to draw away and won by 3 1/2 lengths in a time of 1:08.50.

On July 4, Drefong ran in another allowance optional claimer, this time at a distance of 6 1/2 furlongs. He chased the early leader Guy Code on the outside, then angled in towards the rail and passed Guy Code on the far turn. He continued to draw away down the stretch under a moderate hand ride and won by 5 1/4 lengths.

==== King's Bishop Stakes ====
Drefong stepped up to Grade I company in the King's Bishop Stakes at Saratoga on August 27 where his main rivals in a field of twelve were horses that had qualified for the Kentucky Derby, Mohaymen and Tom's Ready. Starting from the outside post position, Drefong was urged by jockey Mike Smith to the lead, then moved over to the rail and slowed down somewhat to complete the first quarter of a mile in 23.11 seconds. He relaxed around the turn and then drew away down the stretch to win by 3 1/4 lengths in a fast time of 1:21.25.

==== Breeders Cup Sprint ====
Drefong returned to California and trained up to the Breeders' Cup Sprint held on November 5 at Santa Anita. The field included Triple Bend winner Masochistic and Alfred J Vanderbilt stakes winner A.P Indian, who also was riding a six race winning streak. However, the likely favorite Lord Nelson was scratched due to an infection. Drefong was bumped at the start but quickly recovered and entered into a speed duel with Masochistic. The two completed the first quarter in :21.49 and the half in :44.03. The two continued to duel into the stretch when Drefong started to edge away, winning by 1 1/4 lengths. Mind Your Biscuits closed rapidly to finish third and was eventually promoted to second after a positive drug test disqualified Masochistic. "I knew it was going to be a battle," said Baffert. "About the three-eighths pole, it looked like Masochistic was going to have the edge on us. But this little horse, when the running started, he just brought it, and at the eighth pole, he showed the will he has to win."

Despite having only two Grade I wins, Drefong was named the American Champion Sprint Horse of 2016.

=== 2017: 4-year-old season ===
Drefong's next race was supposed to be the Malibu Stakes but he spiked a fever and missed the race. He was then considered for the Dubai Golden Shaheen but Baffert decided the colt would not be able to handle the travel. Drefong finally make his seasonal debut in the Bing Crosby Stakes on July 29, 2017. He broke well but then veered sharply inwards at a gap in the rail where the starting chute meets the main track. Mike Smith lost his balance and fell onto the track. Now riderless, Drefong attempted to take the lead and then forced the other frontrunners, Roy H and Moe Candy, very wide at the top of the stretch. This helped Ransom the Moon to sneak through on the rail and hold off both Roy H and Moe Candy. Both Drefong and Mike Smith were checked for injuries as a precautionary procedure after the race, but both were uninjured. "There are a lot of ways to get beat and that's one of them," said Baffert. "You just are glad everybody is fine and safe. He could have just as easily broken a shoulder, but all is good."

On August 26, Drefong redeemed himself with a "straight and true" victory in the Forego Handicap at Saratoga. Although never seriously pressured, his time of 1:21.12 was less than two-fifths of a second off the track record for seven furlongs.

Drefong trained up to the Breeders' Cup Sprint, held on November 4 at Del Mar – the same track as his disastrous run in the Bing Crosby. He was made the 3-2 favorite in a very deep field that also included Roy H (Santa Anita Sprint Championship), Imperial Hint (Smile Sprint), Mind Your Biscuits (Belmont Sprint) and Takaful (Vosburgh). Drefong broke poorly and settled towards the back of the field, then angled out at the top of the stretch and tried to make a run. However, he came up flat and finished sixth, well beaten by the winner Roy H. "I knew in the first 100 yards it was over when he couldn't make the lead," said Baffert. "I knew the inside post would be tough on him and I could tell when he went across the gap there that Mike (Smith) was a little hesitant with him."

== Stud career ==
Following the 2017 Breeders' Cup Sprint, Drefong was retired to stand stud at Shadai Stallion Station in Japan. His initial stud fee for the 2018 breeding season was ¥3 million.

Drefong was named Japan's champion freshman sire of 2021. His first crop of two-year-olds won a total of 33 races that year, with earnings in excess of ¥367 million. His best progeny to date is Geoglyph, who won the Grade 3 Sapporo Nisai Stakes as a juvenile. Geoglyph would go on to win the 2022 Satsuki Shō, the Japanese equivalent of the 2,000 Guineas, to give Drefong his first Grade 1 victory as a sire.

Drefong's stud fee was raised to ¥7 million for 2022.

=== Notable progeny ===
c = colt, f = filly, g = gelding

bold = grade 1 stakes

Foaled	Name	Sex	Major wins
2019	Geoglyph	c	Sapporo Nisai Stakes, **Satsuki Shō**
2019	Desierto	c	Chunichi Shimbun Hai
2021	Andes Viento	f	Kanto Oaks
2021	Mikki Fight	c	Leopard Stakes, Nagoya Daishoten, Antares Stakes, Teio Sho (twice), JBC Classic, Nippon TV Hai
2021	Water Licht	c	Tokyo Shimbun Hai
2022	Admire Daytona	c	UAE Derby
2022	Matenro Command	c	Hyogo Championship, Kurofune Sho, Tokai Stakes, Summer Champion
2022	Anzu Ame	f	Cluster Cup, JBC Ladies' Classic
2023	Star Anise	f	**Hanshin Juvenile Fillies**, **Oka Sho**

== Pedigree ==
Pedigree of Drefong, bay colt, foaled February 19, 2013
Sire Gio Ponti 2005	Tale of the Cat; 1994	Storm Cat	Storm Bird
Sire Gio Ponti 2005	Tale of the Cat; 1994	Storm Cat	Terlingua
Sire Gio Ponti 2005	Tale of the Cat; 1994	Yarn	Mr. Prospector
Sire Gio Ponti 2005	Tale of the Cat; 1994	Yarn	Narrate
Sire Gio Ponti 2005	Chipeta Springs; 1989	Alydar	Raise a Native
Sire Gio Ponti 2005	Chipeta Springs; 1989	Alydar	Sweet Tooth
Sire Gio Ponti 2005	Chipeta Springs; 1989	Salt Spring (ARG)	Salt Marsh
Sire Gio Ponti 2005	Chipeta Springs; 1989	Salt Spring (ARG)	Jungle Mythologic (ARG)
Dam Eltimaas 2007	Ghostzapper; 2000	Awesome Again	Deputy Minister
Dam Eltimaas 2007	Ghostzapper; 2000	Awesome Again	Primal Force
Dam Eltimaas 2007	Ghostzapper; 2000	Baby Zip	Relaunch
Dam Eltimaas 2007	Ghostzapper; 2000	Baby Zip	Thirty Zip
Dam Eltimaas 2007	Najecam; 1993	Trempolino	Sharpen Up (GB)
Dam Eltimaas 2007	Najecam; 1993	Trempolino	Trephine (FR)
Dam Eltimaas 2007	Najecam; 1993	Sue Warner	*Forli
Dam Eltimaas 2007	Najecam; 1993	Sue Warner	*Bitty Girl (family: 1-n)
