= Do Deuce =

Japanese Thoroughbred racehorse

Do Deuce ドウデュース
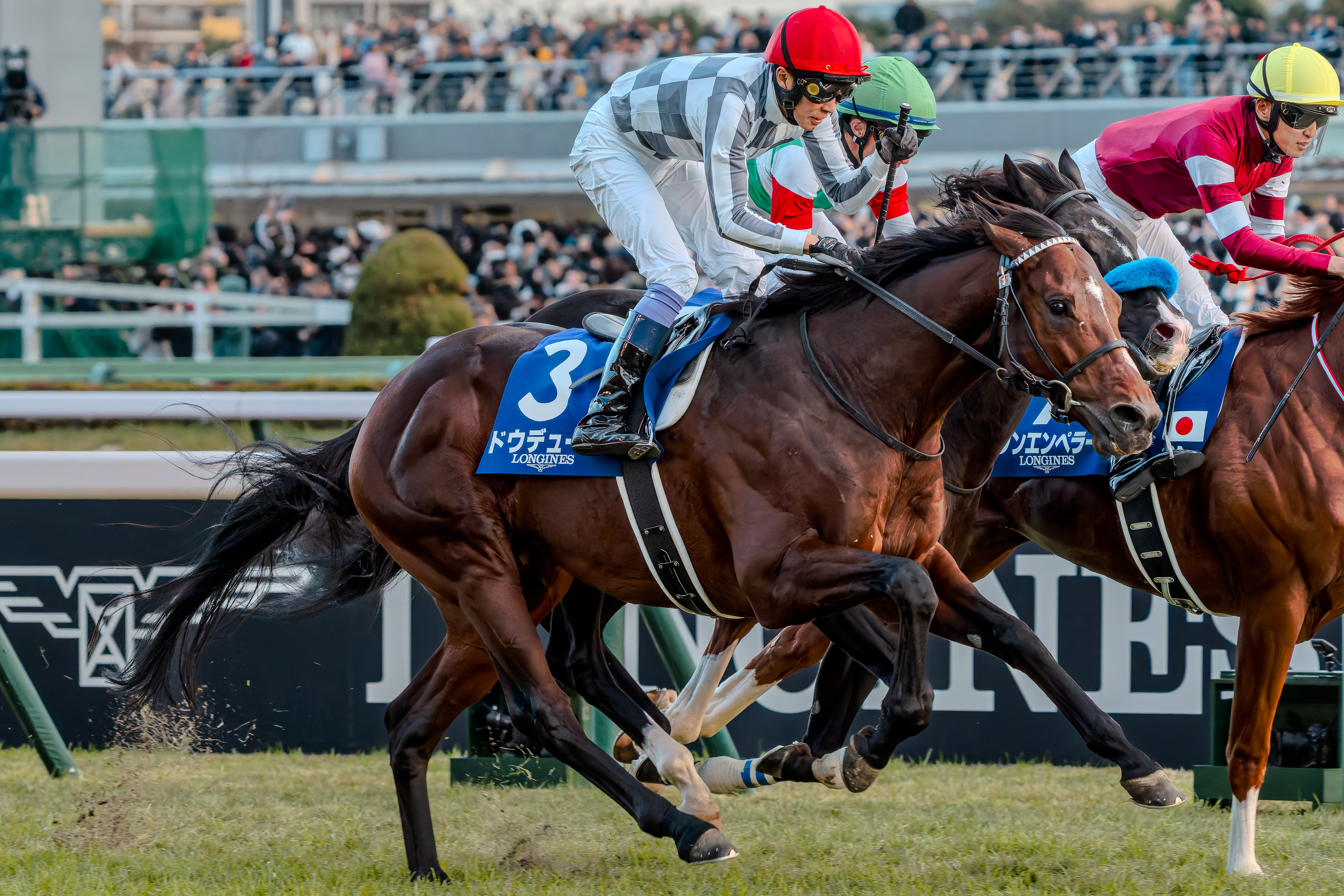
- Do Deuce and Yutaka Take winning the 2024 Japan Cup.
- Breed: Thoroughbred
- Sire: Heart's Cry
- Grandsire: Sunday Silence
- Dam: Dust And Diamonds
- Damsire: Vindication
- Sex: Stallion
- Foaled: May 7, 2019 (age 7)
- Country: Japan
- Colour: Bay
- Breeder: Northern Farm
- Owner: Kieffers Co Ltd
- Racing colours
- Trainer: Yasuo Tomomichi
- Jockey: Yutaka Take
- Record: 16: 8-1-1
- Earnings: ¥1,775,035,800 JPY (Note: Earnings earned overseas are converted to JPY using the formula provided by JRA.); Japan: 1,752,639,000 JPY; France: 9,100 EUR; UAE: 150,000 USD

Major wins
- Asahi Hai Futurity Stakes (2021); Kyoto Kinen (2023); Arima Kinen (2023); Tennō Shō (Autumn) (2024); Japan Cup (2024); Japanese Classic Race wins: Tokyo Yushun (2022)

Awards
- JRA Award for Best Two-Year-Old Colt (2021); Japanese Horse of the Year (2024); JRA Award for Best Older Male Horse (2024)

Do Deuce (Japanese: ドウデュース, Hepburn: Dō Dūsu; foaled 7 May 2019) is a retired Japanese Thoroughbred racehorse. He was the best two-year-old colt in Japan in 2021 when he was undefeated in three races including the Ivy Stakes and the Asahi Hai Futurity Stakes. The highlight of his second campaign came when he defeated Equinox to win the Tokyo Yushun. As a four-year-old in 2023 he won the Kyoto Kinen in February and ended the year by taking the Arima Kinen. He then won the autumn edition of the Tennō Shō and the Japan Cup as a five-year-old in 2024. He was also voted Japanese Horse of the Year and JRA Award for Best Older Male Horse in the same year.

== Background ==
Do Deuce is a bay colt with a white blaze bred in Japan by Northern Farm. During his racing career he was trained by Yasuo Tomomichi and raced in the grey and white of Kieffers Co Ltd.

He was from the twelfth crop of foals sired by Heart's Cry, a horse whose wins included the Arima Kinen and the Dubai Sheema Classic, as well as the only racehorse that was able to defeat Japanese legendary racehorse Deep Impact on Japanese soil. His other foals have included Just A Way, Cheval Grand, Suave Richard, Admire Rakti, and Lys Gracieux. Do Deuce's dam Dust And Diamonds was bred in Kentucky and raced with considerable success in the United States where she won the Gallant Bloom Handicap and ran second in the Breeders' Cup Filly & Mare Sprint. In November 2016 at Keeneland, she was bought for $1,000,000 by Katsumi Yoshida and exported to Japan. She was a great-granddaughter of Darling Lady, a half-sister to the dams of Dancing Brave and Jolypha.

== Racing career ==
=== 2021: two-year-old season ===
Do Deuce began his racing career in a contest for previously unraced juveniles over 1800 metres on good to firm ground at Kokura Racecourse on 5 September 2021. Ridden by Yutaka Take, he started the 0.7/1 favourite and won by a neck from Gaia Force. Take was again in the saddle when the colt was stepped up in class to contest the Listed Ivy Stakes over the same distance at Tokyo Racecourse in the following month. He started second choice in the betting and prevailed by a neck and three quarters of a length from Gran Cielo and Ask Victor More after taking the lead in the straight.

On 19 December at Hanshin Racecourse, Do Deuce was stepped up to Grade 1 class to contest the Asahi Hai Futurity Stakes over 1600 metres and went off the 6.8/1 third choice in the betting behind Serifos (winner of the Niigata Nisai Stakes) and Geoglyph (Sapporo Nisai Stakes). Take positioned the colt on the outside in mid-division before producing a strong run down the centre of the straight. He got the better of a sustained struggle with Serifos in the last 200 metres to win by half a length. After the race, Take, who won the race for the first time, said “Do Deuce is an honest colt. We were able to run in a good position and in good rhythm while observing the others. He responded well going into the straight and although the favorite was stubborn and hard to beat, he dug in remarkably all the way to the line. He’s getting stronger by every race—we can look forward to the spring classics next year."

In January 2022, at the 2021 JRA Awards, Do Deuce was named Best Two-Year-Old Colt, taking 251 of the 296 votes. In the official Japanese rankings, Do Deuce was rated the best two-year-old of 2021, one pound ahead of Serifos and the Hopeful Stakes winner Killer Ability.

=== 2022: three-year-old season ===
On his first run as a three-year-old, Do Deuce started favourite for the Grade 2 Yayoi Sho over 2000 metres at Nakayama Racecourse on 6 March. He tracked the leaders for most of the way and finished strongly but sustained his first defeat as he failed to run down Ask Victor More and was beaten a neck into second place. In the Satsuki Sho over the same course and distance on 17 April the colt started the 2.9/1 favourite in an eighteen-runner field but despite producing a strong late charge from the rear of the field he was unable to reel in the leaders and came home third behind Geoglyph and Equinox.

Do Deuce edged out Equinox at the finish line in 2022 Tokyo Yushun

On 29 May Do Deuce was one of eighteen three-year-olds to contest the 85th running of the Tokyo Yushun over 2400 metres at Tokyo Racecourse, and, with Take again in the saddle went off the 3.2/1 third choice in the betting behind Danon Beluga and Equinox. The other contenders included Geoglyph, Ask Victor More, Justin Palace, Killer Ability, Matenro Leo (Kisaragi Sho) and Ask Wild More (Kyoto Shimbun Hai). After racing towards the rear of the field he began to make progress and moved up into contention on the wide outside on the final turn. He made relentless progress in the straight, overhauled the leader Ask Victor More 150 metres from the finish and held off the late challenge of Equinox to win by a neck. Yutaka Take, who was winning the race for the sixth time said "This is a truly emotional experience for me... Though my colt isn’t such a good starter, we were able to sit in an ideal position so the fast pace didn’t bother me. He had so much left in the tank at the final corner when I asked him for his run—he responded amazingly and took the lead earlier than planned but held on well."

Do Deuce then went to France to run in the Prix Niel before running in the Prix de l'Arc de Triomphe. He finished fourth to Simca Mille for the Prix Niel and finished 19th against Alpinista for the l'Arc de Triomphe, which was the worst out of the four Japanese horses that ran that year.

After returning to Japan, it was announced that he would take the remainder of the year off before returning to the races at next year's Kyoto Kinen, with the Dubai Turf in mind.

=== 2023: four-year-old season ===
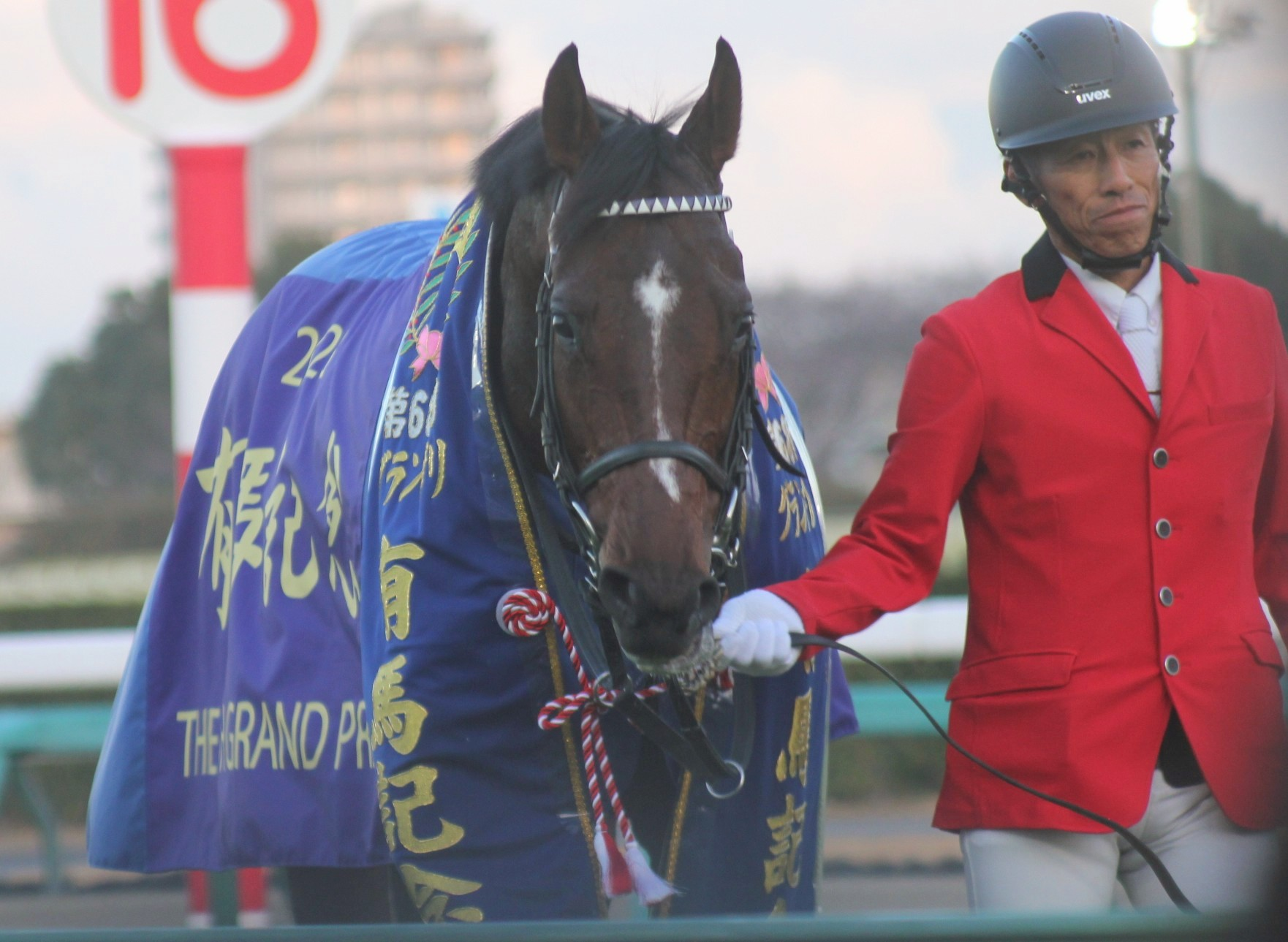
Do Deuce after winning the Arima Kinen

Do Deuce became the first Derby winner in 75 years to win the Kyoto Kinen, after he became the most favored to win. However, he was ultimately scratched from the Dubai Turf due to his near-fore being lame during a pre-race medical check.

He would not return to racing until October 29 when he was entered in to the Autumn Tennō Shō to face Equinox once again. However, Do Deuce finished at 7th in that race, with his usual jockey being injured as a result of being kicked by another horse that day and instead ridden by Keita Tosaki, who was a last minute replacement. Tosaki would reprise his role as Do Deuce's jockey in the following Japan Cup, as Take was still recovering from his injuries at the time, but finished fourth behind Equinox.

Take returned to race with Do Deuce for the Arima Kinen, held on December 24, where he was the second favorite. At the race, the horse managed to run past the pack at the final corner, overtaking the likes of Stars on Earth and Titleholder, winning his third Grade I race with a half length lead. After the Arima Kinen; Take, Tomomichi, and Matsushima (head of Kieffers) expressed their desires to return to Dubai and France once again.

=== 2024: five-year-old season ===
Do Deuce was entered into the Dubai Turf as planned, and finished 5th to Facteur Cheval after a late start. Back in Japan, he entered the Takarazuka Kinen as the most favored horse, but suffered due to the heavy turf and finished 6th to Blow the Horn. After the Takarazuka Kinen, Kieffers Co. announced that he would not be participating in the l'Arc as originally planned, and would retire in the year after racing in the Autumn Tennō Shō, Japan Cup and Arima Kinen.

Do Deuce returned to the racetrack as planned for the Fall Tennō Shō on the 27th of October, and was the second most favored horse after Liberty Island. He won the race from behind, overtaking the runner Ho O Biscuits and holding off a late challenge from Tastiera to take his 4th Group 1 title, with a new JRA record speed of 32.5 seconds for the final three furlongs. With this win, he also became the first male racehorse in JRA history to have won a Group 1 title each year from age 2 to age 5.

Do Deuce with the winning sash of his fifth G1 win, the 2024 Japan Cup

On 24 November, Do Deuce entered the 44th Japan Cup which attracted a group of international racers, such as multiple Group 1 winner Auguste Rodin and Goliath, the winner of the 2024 King George VI and Queen Elizabeth Stakes, and was the most popular horse in the race. He showed his chasing ability once again and overtook the leaders at the final straight, holding off a sustained challenge from the leaders Durezza and Shin Emperor to win by a nose.

After the race, the horse was entered into the Arima Kinen as his retirement race in an attempt to become the first horse to win the Japanese Autumn Triple Crown (Autumn Tennō Shō, Japan Cup, Arima Kinen) since Zenno Rob Roy did in 2004. He received a record-breaking 478,415 votes in the Arima Kinen poll and was planned to start at gate 2 for the race, but was diagnosed with lameness after training and withdrew from the race 2 days before it started. He retired on the next day with the Japan Cup becoming his final start.

Do Deuce now stands stud at Shadai Stallion Station for a fee of 10,000,000JPY.

== Racing form ==
Below data is based on JBIS Search, netkeiba.com and the France Galop.

Date	Course	Race	Class	Distance (Condition)	Field	HN	Odds (Favored)	Finish	Time	Winning (Losing) Margin	Jockey	Winner (2nd Place)	Ref
2021 – two-year-old season
Sep 5	Kokura	Two Year Old Debut		Turf 1800 m (Firm)	13	13	1.7 (1st)	1st	1:50.2	neck	Yutaka Take	(Gaia Force)	
Oct 23	Tokyo	Ivy Stakes	L	Turf 1800 m (Firm)	8	4	3.8 (2nd)	1st	1:49.3	neck	Yutaka Take	(Gran Cielo)	
Dec 19	Hanshin	Asahi Hai Futurity Stakes	GI	Turf 1600 m (Firm)	15	9	7.8 (1st)	1st	1:33.5	1/2 length	Yutaka Take	(Serifos)	
2022 – three-year-old season
Mar 6	Nakayama	Yayoi Sho	GII	Turf 2000 m (Firm)	11	7	2.2 (1st)	2nd	2:00.5	(neck)	Yutaka Take	Ask Victor More	
Apr 17	Nakayama	Satsuki Sho	GI	Turf 2000 m (Firm)	18	12	3.9 (1st)	3rd	2:00.0	(2 1/4 lengths)	Yutaka Take	Geoglyph	
May 29	Tokyo	Tokyo Yushun	GI	Turf 2400 m (Firm)	18	13	4.2 (1st)	1st	R2:21.9	neck	Yutaka Take	(Equinox)	
Sep 11	Longchamp	Prix Niel	GII	Turf 2400 m (Soft)	7	5	2.9 (1st)	4th	2:33.46	(3 3/4 lengths)	Yutaka Take	Simca Mille	
Oct 2	Longchamp	Prix de l'Arc de Triomphe	GI	Turf 2400 m (Very Soft)	20	19	37.0 (11th)	19th	2:44.48	(42 1/4 lengths)	Yutaka Take	Alpinista	
2023 – four-year-old season
Feb 12	Hanshin	Kyoto Kinen	GII	Turf 2200 m (Firm)	13	12	2.5 (1st)	1st	2:10.9	3 1/2 lengths	Yutaka Take	(Matenro Leo)	
Mar 25	Meydan	Dubai Turf	GI	Turf 1800 m (Firm)	14	3	Scratched				Yutaka Take	Lord North	
Oct 29	Tokyo	Tennō Shō (Autumn)	GI	Turf 2000 m (Firm)	11	3	4.3 (2nd)	7th	1:56.6	(8 1/2 lengths)	Keita Tosaki	Equinox	
Nov 26	Tokyo	Japan Cup	GI	Turf 2400 m (Firm)	18	5	13.2 (3rd)	4th	2:22.7	(5 3/4 lengths)	Keita Tosaki	Equinox	
Dec 24	Nakayama	Arima Kinen	GI	Turf 2500 m (Firm)	16	5	5.2 (1st)	1st	2:30.9	1/2 length	Yutaka Take	(Stars On Earth)	
2024 – five-year-old season
Mar 30	Meydan	Dubai Turf	GI	Turf 1800 m (Firm)	16	5	5.85 (3rd)	5th	1:46.25	(2 1/4 lengths)	Yutaka Take	Facteur Cheval	
Jun 23	Kyoto	Takarazuka Kinen	GI	Turf 2200 m (Soft)	13	4	2.3 (1st)	6th	2:12.9	(6 lengths)	Yutaka Take	Blow the Horn	
Oct 27	Tokyo	Tennō Shō (Autumn)	GI	Turf 2000 m (Firm)	15	7	3.8 (2nd)	1st	1:57.3	1 1/4 lengths	Yutaka Take	(Tastiera)	
Nov 24	Tokyo	Japan Cup	GI	Turf 2400 m (Firm)	14	3	2.3 (1st)	1st	2:25.5	neck	Yutaka Take	(Shin Emperor)	
Nov 24	Tokyo	Japan Cup	GI	Turf 2400 m (Firm)	14	3	2.3 (1st)	1st	2:25.5	neck	Yutaka Take	(Durezza)	
Dec 22	Nakayama	Arima Kinen	GI	Turf 2500 m (Firm)	15	2	Scratched				Yutaka Take	Regaleira	

R in the chart and the time written in red indicates the horse finished in record time.

== Pedigree ==
Pedigree of Do Deuce (JPN), bay colt, 2019
Sire Heart's Cry (JPN) 2001	Sunday Silence (USA); 1986	Halo	Hail to Reason
Sire Heart's Cry (JPN) 2001	Sunday Silence (USA); 1986	Halo	Cosmah
Sire Heart's Cry (JPN) 2001	Sunday Silence (USA); 1986	Wishing Well	Understanding
Sire Heart's Cry (JPN) 2001	Sunday Silence (USA); 1986	Wishing Well	Mountain Flower
Sire Heart's Cry (JPN) 2001	Irish Dance; 1990	Tony Bin (IRE)	Kampala (GB)
Sire Heart's Cry (JPN) 2001	Irish Dance; 1990	Tony Bin (IRE)	Severn Bridge (GB)
Sire Heart's Cry (JPN) 2001	Irish Dance; 1990	Buper Dance (USA)	Lyphard
Sire Heart's Cry (JPN) 2001	Irish Dance; 1990	Buper Dance (USA)	My Bupers
Dam Dust and Diamonds (USA) 2008	Vindication; 2000	Seattle Slew	Bold Reasoning
Dam Dust and Diamonds (USA) 2008	Vindication; 2000	Seattle Slew	My Charmer
Dam Dust and Diamonds (USA) 2008	Vindication; 2000	Strawberry Reason	Strawberry Road (AUS)
Dam Dust and Diamonds (USA) 2008	Vindication; 2000	Strawberry Reason	Pretty Reason
Dam Dust and Diamonds (USA) 2008	Majestically; 2002	Gone West	Mr Prospector
Dam Dust and Diamonds (USA) 2008	Majestically; 2002	Gone West	Secrettame
Dam Dust and Diamonds (USA) 2008	Majestically; 2002	Darling Dame	Lyphard
Dam Dust and Diamonds (USA) 2008	Majestically; 2002	Darling Dame	Darling Lady (Family 3-d)

- Do Deuce in inbred 4 × 4 to Lyphard, meaning that this stallion appears twice in the fourth generation of his pedigree.
