= Geoglyph (horse) =

Japanese Thoroughbred racehorse

Geoglyph; ジオグリフ
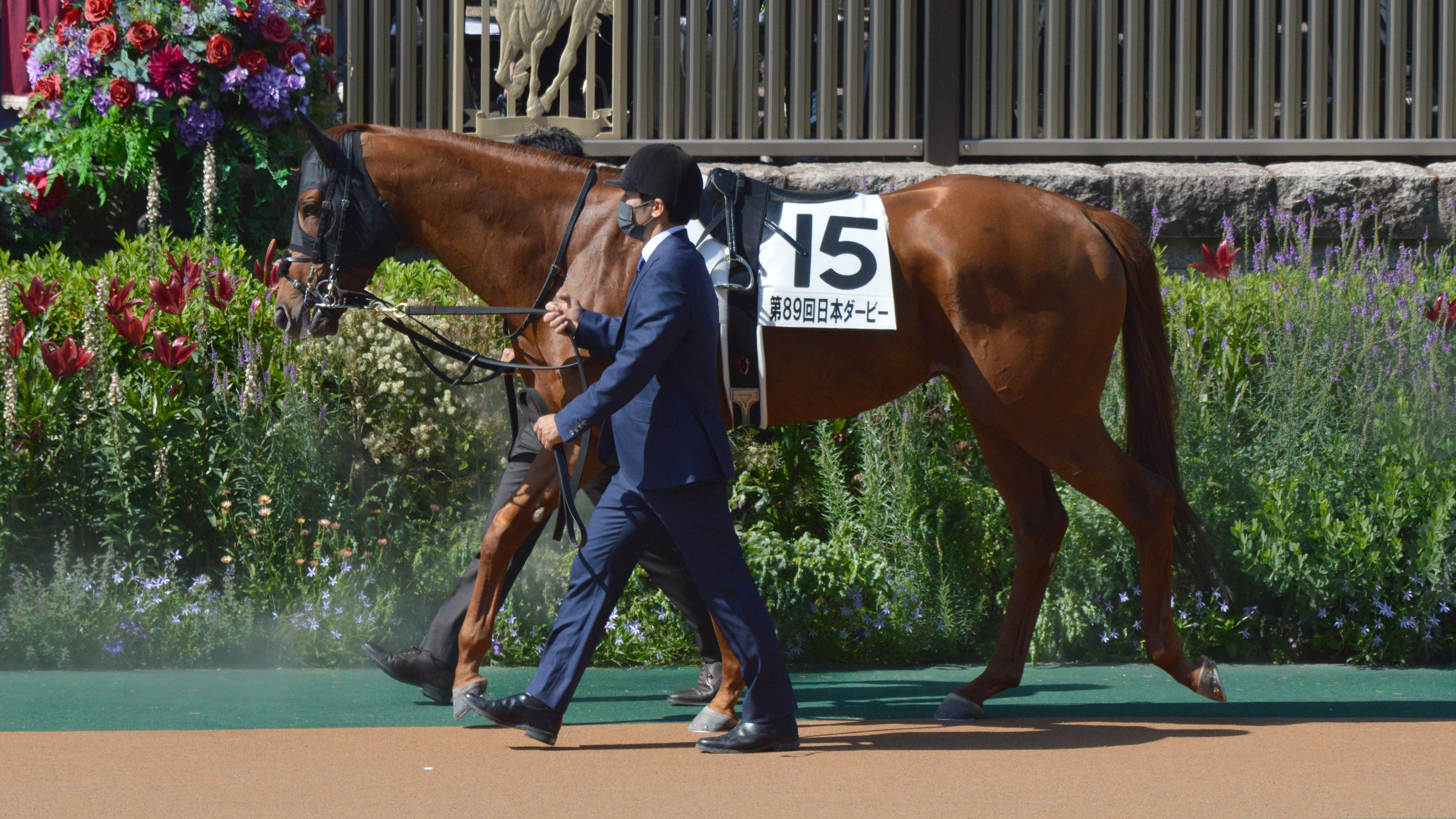
- Geoglyph at the Tokyo Yushun
- Sire: Drefong
- Grandsire: Gio Ponti
- Dam: Aromatico
- Damsire: King Kamehameha
- Sex: Colt
- Foaled: 25 February 2019
- Country: Japan
- Colour: Chestnut
- Breeder: Northern Farm
- Owner: Sunday Racing
- Racing colours
- Trainer: Tetsuya Kimura →Takaki Iwato →Tetsuya Kimura
- Jockey: Yuichi Fukunaga
- Record: 21: 3-2-1
- Earnings: ¥517,524,600 (Note: Earnings earned overseas are converted to JPY using the formula provided by JRA by year: 2023, 2024.); JP : 312,160,000 JPY; HK : 680,000 HKD; SA : 1,500,000 USD; US : 60,000 USD

Major wins
- Sapporo Nisai Stakes (2021); Satsuki Sho (2022)
- Last updated on September 21, 2025

Geoglyph (Japanese: ジオグリフ, Hepburn: Jiogurifu; foaled 25 February 2019) is a retired Japanese Thoroughbred racehorse. He showed promise as a two-year-old in 2021 when he won two of his three races including the Sapporo Nisai Stakes. In the following year he ran second in the Kyodo Tsushin Hai before winning the Satsuki Sho.

== Background ==
Geoglyph is a bay colt with a white star bred in Japan by Northern Farm. During his racing career he was trained by Tetsuya Kimura and raced in the black, red and yellow colours of the Northern Farm associate Sunday Racing.

He was from the first crop of foals sired by the American Champion Sprint Horse Drefong who was exported to Japan as a breeding stallion at the end of his track career. Geoglyph's dam Aromatico showed high class form in Japan, winning six of her twenty-seven races and being placed in both the Shuka Sho and the Queen Elizabeth II Cup. She was descended from the British broodmare Justitia, making her a distant relative of Roland Gardens and Kooyonga.

== Racing career ==
=== 2021: two-year-old season ===
Geoglyph began his racing career in a contest for previously unraced juveniles over 1800 metres on good to firm ground at Tokyo Racecourse on 26 June 2021. Ridden by Christophe Lemaire he started the 3.5/1 second favourite in a ten-runner field and won by one and a half lengths from Asahi with the favourite Ask Victor More a further half length away in third place. Lemaire was again in the saddle when the colt was stepped up in class to contest the Grade 3 Sapporo Nisai Stakes over the same distance on 4 September at Sapporo Racecourse. Starting the 1.1/1 favourite he raced towards the rear in early stages, moved up to take the lead in the straight and drew right away to win by four lengths from Ask Wild More. Lemaire later commented "he never hit top gear, so it was an easy win".

On 19 December at Hanshin Racecourse, Geoglyph was stepped up to Grade 1 class to contest Asahi Hai Futurity Stakes over 1600 metres and went off the 2.2/1 third choice in the betting behind Serifos. Lemaire positioned the colt towards the rear before making strong late progress but Geoglyph was never able to reach the leaders and came home fifth behind Do Deuce, beaten just under three lengths by the winner.

In the official Japanese rankings Geoglyph was rated the ninth-best two-year-old of 2021, six pounds behind the top-rated Do Deuce.

=== 2022: three-year-old season ===
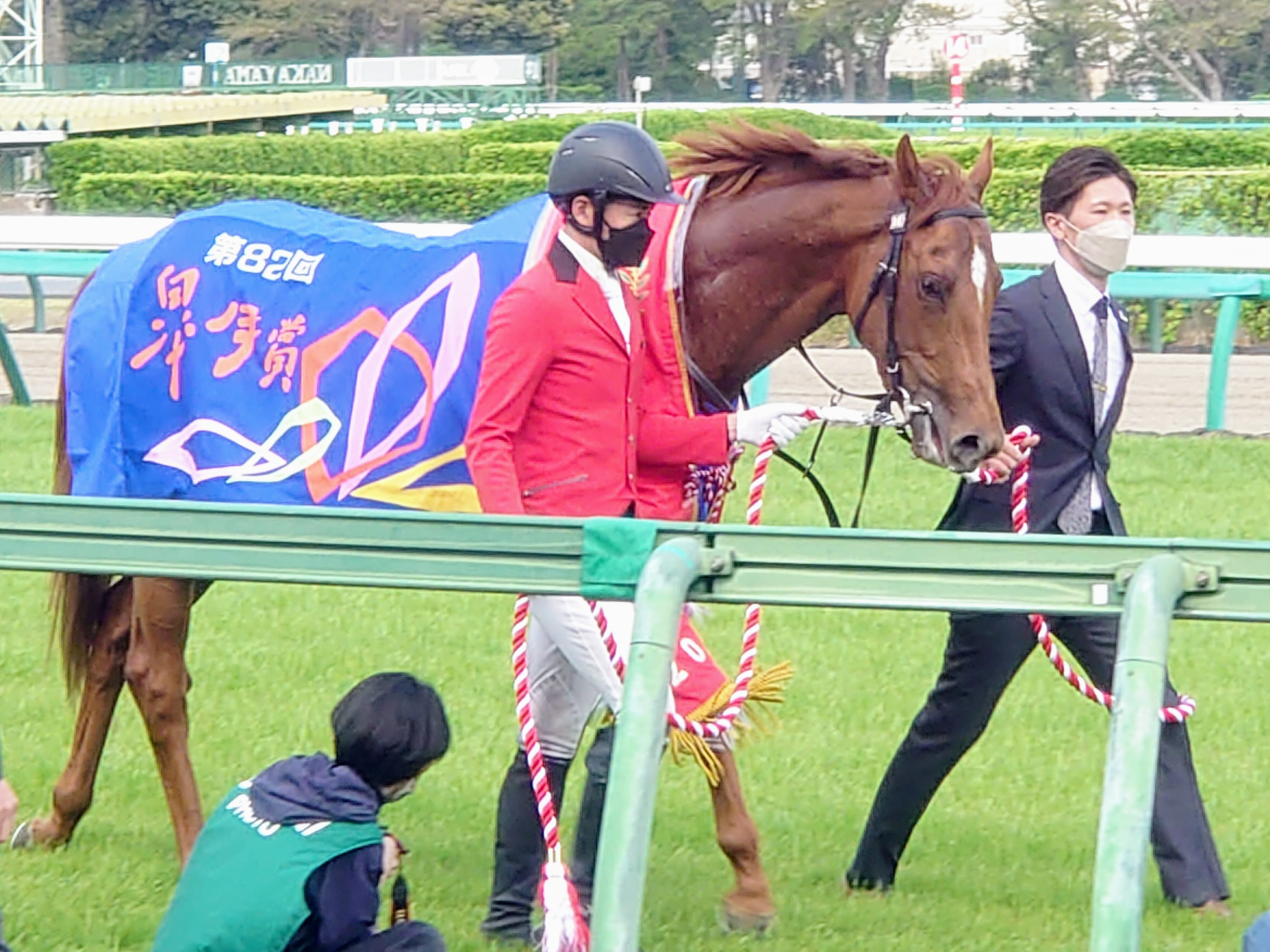
Geoglyph after winning the Satsuki Sho

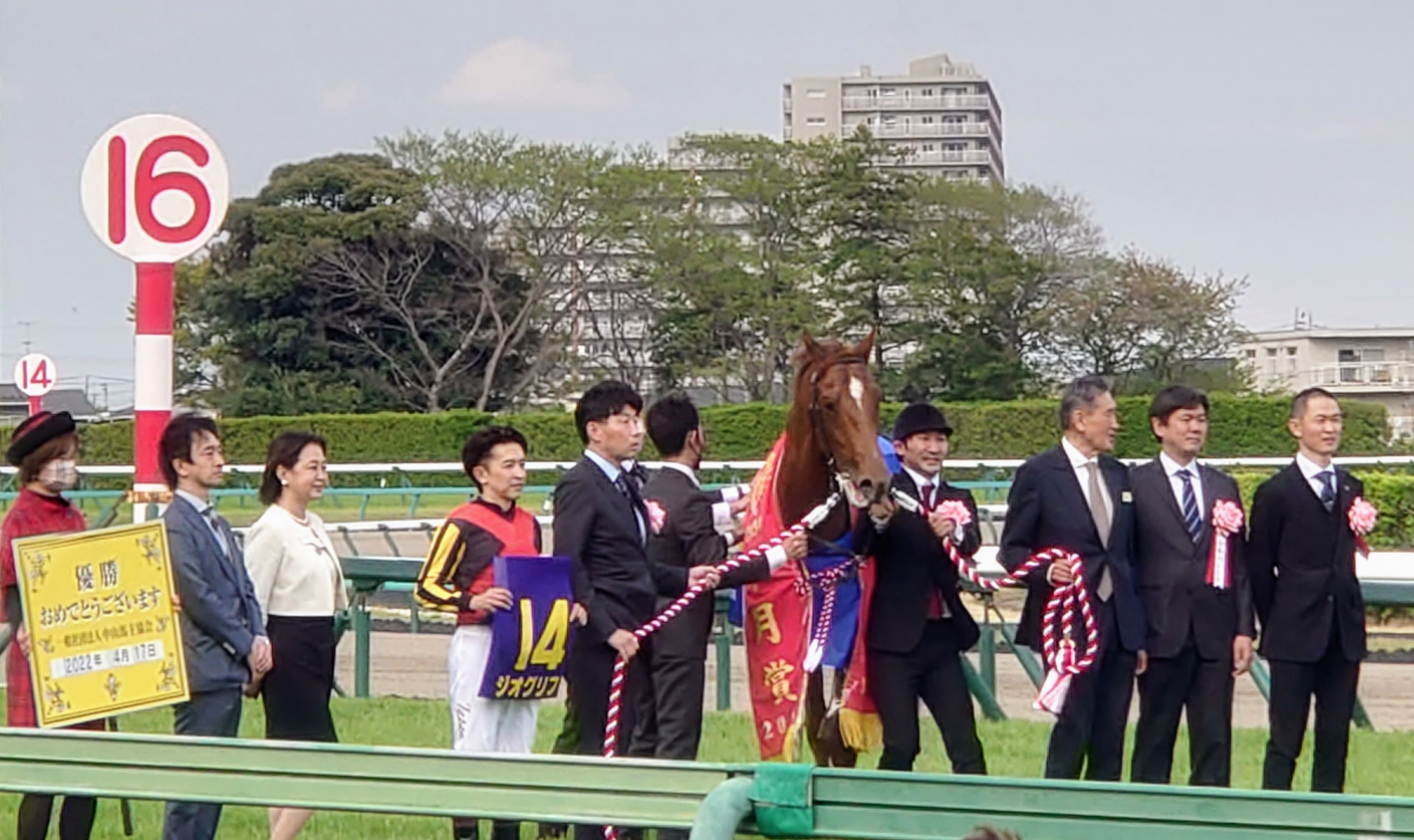
Geoglyph at the post-Satsuki Sho ceremony

On his first run as a three-year-old, Geoglyph started favourite for the Grade 3 Kyodo Tsushin Hai over 1800 metres at Tokyo Racecourse on 13 February. He tracked the leaders for most of the way and made steady progress in the straight but was beaten a length and a half into second place by Danon Beluga. His trainer Tetsuya Kimura, later commented that the colt "hadn't trained so well, which was possibly down to the climate and how he felt mentally."

In the Satsuki Sho over 2000 metres at Hanshin Racecourse on 17 April the colt started the 8.1/1 fifth choice in the betting behind Do Deuce, Danon Beluga, Equinox (winner of the 2021 Tokyo Sports Hai Nisai Stakes) and Killer Ability in an eighteen-runner field which also included Ask Victor More (Yayoi Sho), Onyankopon (Keisei Hai), Justin Rock (Kyoto Nisai Stakes), Be Astonished (Spring Stakes) and Matenro Leo (Kisaragi Sho). With Lemaire taking the ride on his more fancied stablemate Equinox, Geoglyph was partnered by Yuichi Fukunaga. Geoglyph tracked the leaders in fifth place as Ask Victor More set the pace, before switching to the outside to make his challenge in the straight. He ranged up alongside Equinox 200 metres from the finish and after briefly looking held by his stablemate he rallied strongly in the final strides to gain the advantage and win by a length. After the race Fukunaga said "His start was good and we were able to sit in an ideal position which was crucial in winning today... The colt has the strength to sustain his speed so I geared him wide launching an early bid before the fourth corner. I'm just glad I was able to do my job. In the Tokyo Yushun, we'll have to see if he can handle the 400-meter added distance."

Geoglyph finished seventh at the Tokyo Yushun behind Do Deuce, and took a three month long break after undergoing a leg surgery to take out a chipped bone.

After recuperation, Geoglyph was originally slated to run in the Tenno Sho (Fall) with Christophe Soumillon as his new jockey, but as Soumillion was suspended due to his riding suspencion, Fukunaga was chosen once again to ride Geoglyph at the Tenno Sho. Geoglyph wound up finishing in 9th place behind Equinox.

Geoglyph would make his foreign debut at the Hong Kong Cup, where he finished at 6th place behind Romantic Warrior.

=== 2023: four-year old season ===
Geoglyph started his four year old season by entering the year's Saudi Cup, with Lemaire back as his jockey. The race proceeded with Geoglyph trailing Panthalassa and coming in fourth behind him, who had been consistently leading the entire race.

Geoglyph did not return to Japan but rather headed to Dubai in order to compete in the Dubai World Cup. However, he did not do as well with him finishing in 11th place behind Ushba Tesoro. He later returned to Japan to race in the Takarazuka Kinen but finished 9th.

After taking the summer off he was entered in to the Mile Championship Nambu Hai but finished 9th. He was then entered in to the Champions Cup with William Buick as his jockey but finished 15th.

=== 2024: five-year old season ===
Geoglyph returned to turf races this season, starting with the Nakayama Kinen, where he was placed on the inside of the pack, where he pushed up the position before ultimately finishing third, which was his best performance since his Satsuki Sho. He was then entered in to the Ōsaka Hai held on March 31, where he finished 5th. He then raced in the Yasuda Kinen, where he finished 6th, and came in second at the Sapporo Kinen.

Geoglyph was then sent to the United States to compete in the Breeders' Cup Mile held at Del Mar Fairgrounds on November 3, where he finished at 5th place.

=== 2025: six-year old season ===
Geoglyph started the season off with the Tokyo Shimbun Hai, where he finished at 11th place. He was then sent to Australia to enter the Doncaster Handicap that was held at the Randwick Racecourse on April 5. However he finished at 18th place. He was later sent to the Queen Elizabeth Stakes but finished 13th.

After the Queen Elizabeth Stakes, it was discovered that the horse had suffered a bone fracture. The horse was sent back to Japan, where the horse went through an x-ray examination, the horse was diagnosed to have suffered a fracture of the right forelimb's third metacarpal. Ultimately, it was decided on August 27 that the horse would be retired to stand stud at the Yushun Stallion Station.

== Racing form ==
The following form is based on information available on JBIS-Search, netkeiba.com, Hong Kong Jockey Club, Racing Post, Emirates Racing Authority, and Total Performance Data.

Date	Track	Race	Grade	Distance (condition)	Entry	HN	Odds (Favored)	Finish	Time	Margins	Jockey	Winner (Runner-up)
2021 – two-year-old season
Jun 26	Tokyo	Maiden race		Turf 1800 m (Firm)	10	2	4.5 (3rd)	1st	1:48.2	-0.2	Christophe Lemaire	(Asahi)
Sept 4	Sapporo	Sapporo Nisai Stakes	GIII	Turf 1800 m (Firm)	9	9	2.1 (1st)	1st	1:49.1	-0.7	Christophe Lemaire	(Ask Wild MOre)
Dec 19	Hanshin	Asahi Hai Futurity Stakes	GI	Turf 1600 m (Firm)	15	13	3.2 (2nd)	5th	1:33.0	0.5	Christophe Lemaire	Do Deuce
2022 – three-year-old season
Feb 13	Tokyo	Kyodo Tsushin Hai	GII	Turf 1800 m (Good)	11	5	3.4 (1st)	2nd	1:34.0	0.2	Christophe Lemaire	Danon Beluga
Apr 17	Nakayama	Satsuki Shō	GI	Turf 2000 m (Firm)	18	14	9.1 (5th)	1st	1:59.7	-0.1	Yuichi Fukunaga	(Equinox)
May 29	Tokyo	Tōkyō Yūshun	GI	Turf 2400 m (Firm)	18	15	5,9 (4th)	7th	2:22.9	1.0	Yuichi Fukunaga	Do Deuce
Oct 30	Tokyo	Tenno Sho (Autumn)	GI	Turf 2000 m (Firm)	18	15	5.9 (4th)	9th	1:58.3	0.8	Yuichi Fukunaga	Equinox
Dec 11	Sha Tin	Hong Kong Cup	GI	Turf 2000 m (Good)	12	11	19.0 (6th)	6th	2:00.79	1.09	William Buick	Romantic Warrior
2023 – four-year-old season
Feb 25	King Abdulaziz	Saudi Cup	GI	Dirt 1800 m (Fast)	13	5	26.0 (9th)	4th	1:51.08	0.28	Christophe Lemaire	Panthalassa
Mar 25	Meydan	Dubai World Cup	GI	Dirt 2000 m (Fast)	15	7	16.9 (5th)	11th	2:09.05	5.80	Christophe Lemaire	Ushba Tesoro
Jun 25	Hanshin	Takarazuka Kinen	GI	Turf 2200 m (Firm)	17	13	83.1 (11th)	9th	2:11.9	0.7	Mirai Iwata	Equinox
Oct 9	Morioka	Mile Championship Nambu Hai	JpnI	Dirt 1600 m (Good)	14	9	5.7 (3rd)	9th	1:37.0	3.2	Mirai Iwata	Lemon Pop
Dec 3	Chukyo	Champions Cup	GI	Dirt 1800 m (Fast)	15	3	48.1 (10th)	15th	1:55.0	4.4	William Buick	Lemon Pop
2024 – five-year-old season
Feb 25	Nakayama	Nakayama Kinen	GII	Turf 1800 m (Good)	16	4	10.0 (4th)	3rd	1:48.5	0.4	Keita Tosaki	Matenro Sky
Mar 31	Hanshin	Ōsaka Hai	GI	Turf 2000 m (Firm)	16	6	15.4 (8th)	5th	1:58.5	0.3	Hiroshi Kitamura	Bellagio Opera
June 2	Tokyo	Yasuda Kinen	GI	Turf 1600 m (Good)	18	4	43.9 (12th)	6th	1:32.8	0.5	Hiroshi Kitamura	Romantic Warrior
Aug 18	Sapporo	Sapporo Kinen	GII	Turf 2000 m (Firm)	12	2	7.8 (3rd)	2nd	1:59.9	0.3	Takeshi Yokoyama	North Bridge
Nov 3	Del Mar	Breeders' Cup Mile	GI	Turf 1600 m (Firm)	12	3	5th	5th	1:33.2	0.5	Takeshi Yokoyama	More Than Looks
2025 – six-year-old season
Feb 9	Tokyo	Tokyo Shimbun Hai	GIII	Turf 1600 m (Firm)	16	11	21.9 (7th)	11th	1:33.4	0.8	Takeshi Yokoyama	Water Licht
Apr 5	Randwick	Doncaster Handicap	GI	Turf 1600 m (Good)	20	4	10th	18th	1:36.7	1.4	Damian Lane	Stefi Magnetica
Apr 12	Randwick	Queen Elizabeth Stakes	GI	Turf 2000 m (Good)	13	11	21.3 (5th)	13th	2:04.5	4.1	Damian Lane	Via Sistina

== Pedigree ==
Pedigree of Geoglyph (JPN), chestnut colt, 2019
Sire Drefong (USA) 2013	Gio Ponti (USA); 2005	Tale of the Cat	Storm Cat
Sire Drefong (USA) 2013	Gio Ponti (USA); 2005	Tale of the Cat	Yarn
Sire Drefong (USA) 2013	Gio Ponti (USA); 2005	Chipeta Springs	Alydar
Sire Drefong (USA) 2013	Gio Ponti (USA); 2005	Chipeta Springs	Salt Spring (ARG)
Sire Drefong (USA) 2013	Eltimaas (USA); 2007	Ghostzapper	Awesome Again (CAN)
Sire Drefong (USA) 2013	Eltimaas (USA); 2007	Ghostzapper	Baby Zip
Sire Drefong (USA) 2013	Eltimaas (USA); 2007	Najecam	Trempolino
Sire Drefong (USA) 2013	Eltimaas (USA); 2007	Najecam	Sue Warner
Dam Aromatico (JPN) 2009	King Kamehameha (JPN); 2001	Kingmambo (USA)	Mr Prospector
Dam Aromatico (JPN) 2009	King Kamehameha (JPN); 2001	Kingmambo (USA)	Miesque
Dam Aromatico (JPN) 2009	King Kamehameha (JPN); 2001	Manfath (IRE)	Last Tycoon
Dam Aromatico (JPN) 2009	King Kamehameha (JPN); 2001	Manfath (IRE)	Pilot Bird (GB)
Dam Aromatico (JPN) 2009	Nasca (JPN); 2003	Sunday Silence (USA)	Halo
Dam Aromatico (JPN) 2009	Nasca (JPN); 2003	Sunday Silence (USA)	Wishing Well
Dam Aromatico (JPN) 2009	Nasca (JPN); 2003	Andes Lady	Northern Taste (CAN)
Dam Aromatico (JPN) 2009	Nasca (JPN); 2003	Andes Lady	Peru Sport (Family: 19)
