= Tetsuya Kimura =

Japanese horse trainer (born 1972)

Tetsuya Kimura 木村哲也
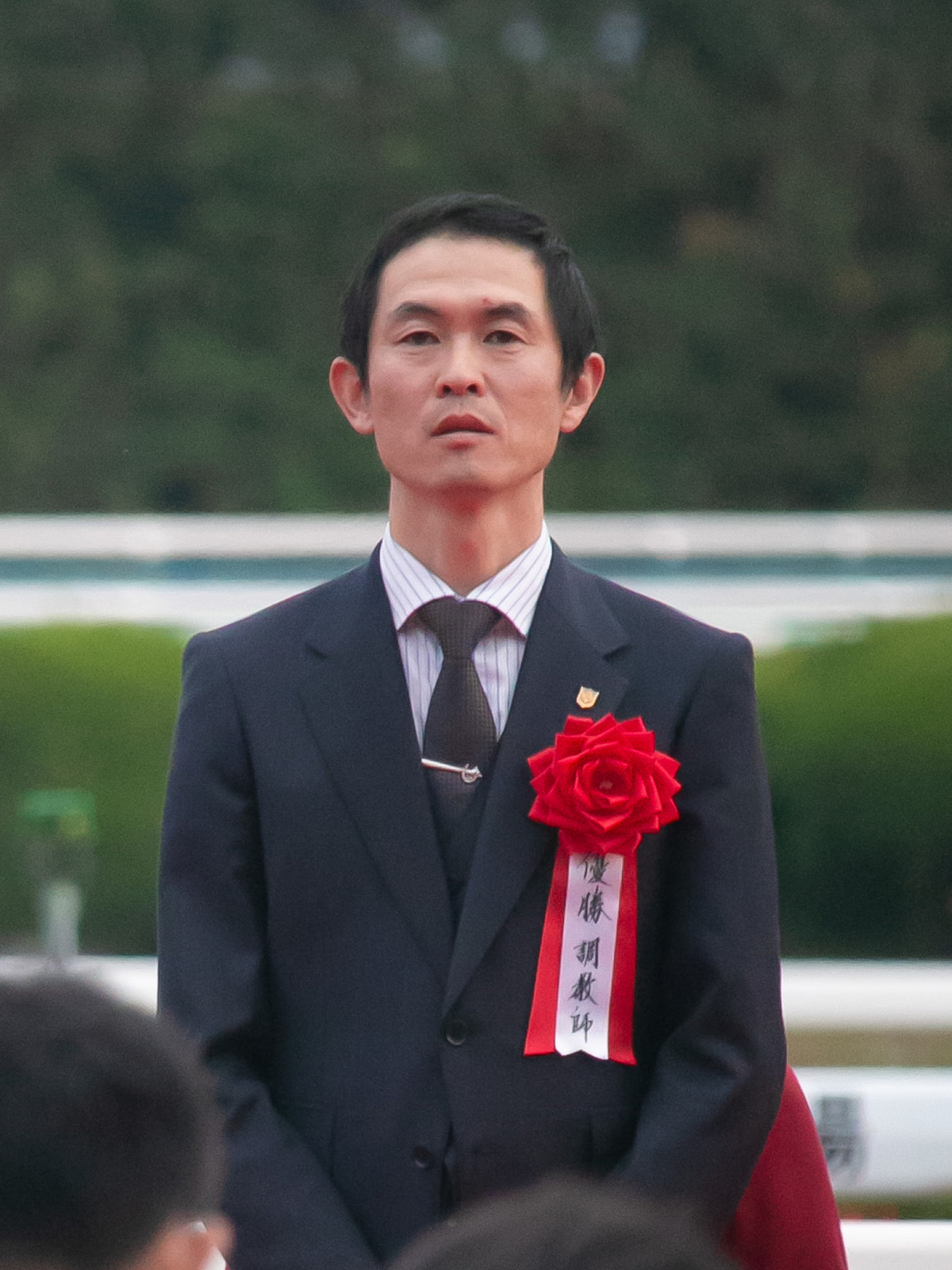
- Kimura at the 2018 Mile Championship

Personal information
- Nationality: Japanese
- Born: November 16, 1972 (age 53) Kanagawa Prefecture, Japan
- Occupation: Trainer

Horse racing career
- Sport: Horse racing
- Career wins: n/a

Racing awards
- JRA Award for Best Trainer (winning average) (2018, 2023); JRA Award for Best trainer (training technique) (2018, 2022, 2023)

Significant horses
- Stelvio, Geoglyph, Equinox, Cervinia, Regaleira, Redentor

Tetsuya Kimura (木村哲也) is an active Japanese trainer of Thoroughbred race horses.

== Career ==
Kimura graduated from Kanagawa University before becoming a groom at the Seisuke Sato stable in 2000. He would then become an assistant trainer at the Yutaka Takahashi stable, before moving to Kazuhiro Seishi's stable and later Tadashige Nakagawa's stable before obtaining his own trainer license in December 2010.

After becoming a stable, he inherited the stable managed by Masakazu Akiyama in June 2011. Kimura would win his first race in August of that year, when Red Planet won an allowance race at Niigata Racecourse.

In March 2015, Kimura had won his first-grade race when he won the Flower Cup with Albiano.

On August 14, 2016, Kimura became the 149th trainer to win his 100th Japan Racing Association (JRA) race when he won an allowance race at Sapporo Racecourse with La Californie.

Kimura won his first Grade I race when he won the Mile Championship in 2018 with Stelvio. Kimura also won the JRA Awards for Best Trainer for both winning average and training technique that same year.

Kimura won his 200th JRA race when he won an allowance race at Nakayama Racecourse with Rimondi on April 7, 2019.

On October 6, 2024, he won his 12th race at the Tokyo Racecourse, becoming the 39th trainer to achieve 400 JRA wins in his 2,796th race.

=== Power harassment scandal ===
In January 2021, Kimura was sued by his retained jockey, Kaito Otsuka, who accused him of engaging in power harassment towards him. In a press conference, Otsuka's father and lawyer also told the press that they filed charges for two counts of assault to the Inashiki Police Station of the Ibaraki Prefectural Police Department. Kimura was indicted by the Tsuchiura branch of the Mito District Public Prosecutors Office on June 30, 2021, and was subsequently fined 100,000 yen on July 12, 2021.

After the criminal charges were settled, the JRA suspended him until further notice on July 28, 2021. This also resulted in all 67 horses of the Kimura stable, including Fairy Stakes winner Fine Rouge as well as both Geoglyph and Equinox, to be transferred to Takaki Iwato's stable for the time being. After a deliberation by the stewards committee on August 18, it was decided that Kimura would be suspended from training until October 31, 2021. Following the end of suspension, 62 of the horses that were transferred to the Iwato stable were transferred back to Kimura's stable. In the meantime, the lawsuit between Kimura and Otsuka was settled on October 8, 2021, with Kimura apologizing and paying 800,000 yen in damages to Otsuka.

== Major wins ==
Japan

- Arima Kinen - (2) - Equinox (2022), Regaleira (2024)
- February Stakes - (1) - Costa Nova (2025, 2026)
- Hopeful Stakes - (1) - Regaleira (2023)
- Japan Cup - (1) - Equinox (2023)
- Mile Championship - (1) - Stelvio (2018)
- Queen Elizabeth II Cup - (1) - Regaleira (2025)
- Satsuki Shō - (1) - Geoglyph (2022)
- Shūka Sho - (1) - Cervinia (2024)
- Takarazuka Kinen - (1) - Equinox (2023)
- Tennō Shō (Autumn) - (2) - Equinox (2022, 2023)
- Tennō Shō (Spring) - (1) - Redentor (2025)
- Yushun Himba - (1) - Cervinia (2024)

United Arab Emirates

- Dubai Sheema Classic - (1) - Equinox (2023)
