= Equinox (horse) =

Japanese-bred Thoroughbred racehorse and sire

Equinox イクイノックス
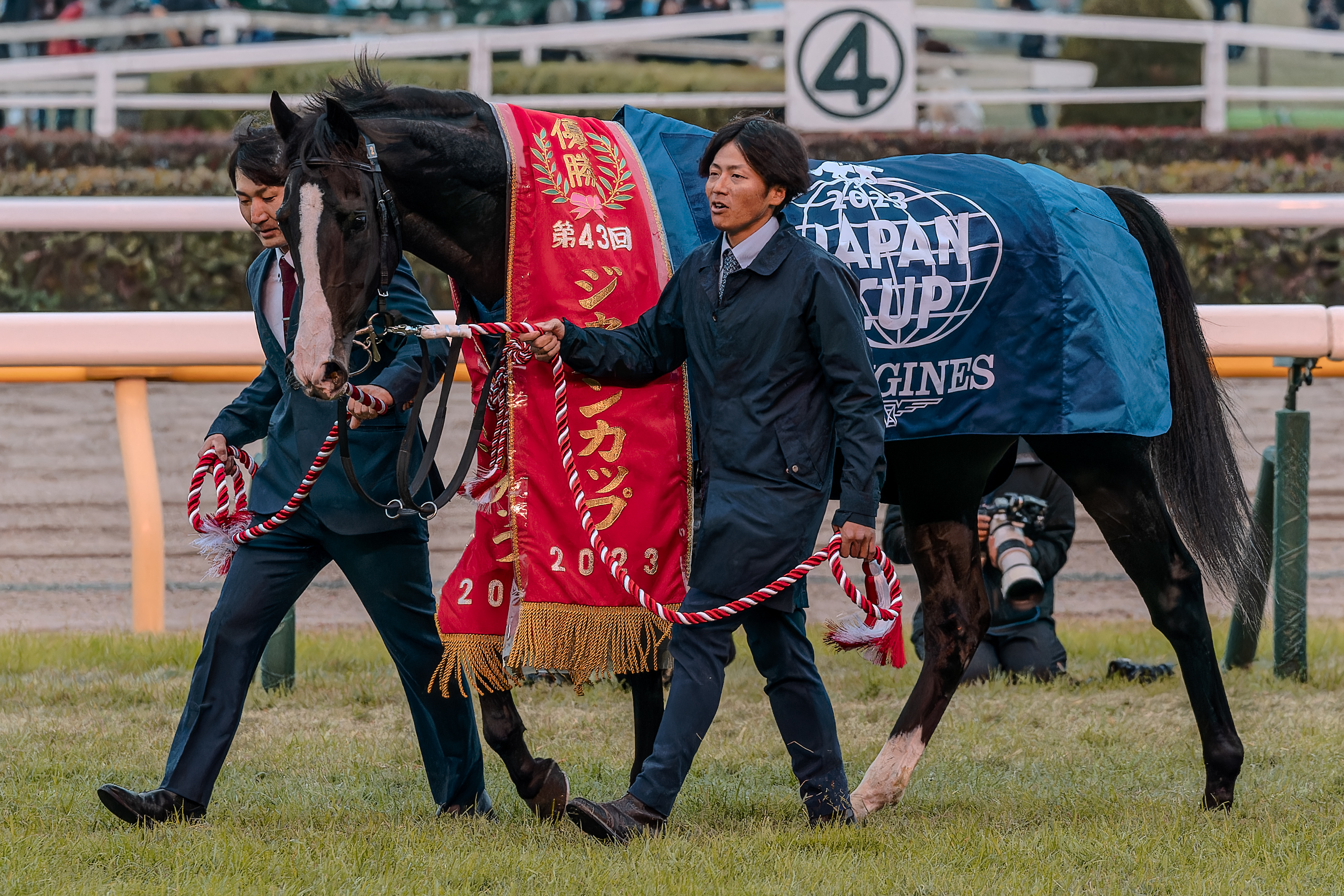
- Equinox after winning the 2023 Japan Cup
- Breed: Thoroughbred
- Sire: Kitasan Black (JPN)
- Grandsire: Black Tide (JPN)
- Dam: Chateau Blanche (JPN)
- Damsire: King Halo (JPN)
- Sex: Stallion
- Foaled: March 23, 2019 (age 7)
- Country: Japan
- Color: Brown
- Breeder: Northern Farm
- Owner: Silk Racing
- Racing colors
- Trainer: Tetsuya Kimura → Takaki Iwato → Tetsuya Kimura
- Jockey: Christophe Lemaire
- Record: 10:8-2-0
- Earnings: 2,215,446,100 JPY; JPN: 1,756,556,000 JPY; UAE: 3,480,000 USD

Major wins
- Tokyo Sports Hai Nisai Stakes (2021); Tenno Sho (Autumn) (2022, 2023); Arima Kinen (2022); Dubai Sheema Classic (2023); Takarazuka Kinen (2023); Japan Cup (2023)

Awards
- Japanese Horse of the Year (2022, 2023); JRA Award for Best Three-Year-Old Colt (2022); JRA Award for Best Older Male Horse (2023)

Honours
- Japan Racing Association Hall of Fame (2025); Timeform rating: 136; Timeform Leading Male 3yo+ (2023); World's Best Racehorse (2023)

Equinox (Japanese: イクイノックス, Hepburn: Ikuinokkusu; foaled March 23, 2019) is a retired champion Japanese Thoroughbred racehorse and current sire. He won both of his races as a two-year-old in 2021, taking the Grade II Tokyo Sports Hai Nisai Stakes on his second start. In the early part of his second season he finished second in both the Satsuki Sho and the Tokyo Yushun before emerging as a high-class horse in the autumn when he won the Autumn Tenno Sho and the Arima Kinen.

Prior to retiring in November 2023, he won all of his races as a four-year-old, the Dubai Sheema Classic, the Takarazuka Kinen, an Autumn Tenno Sho repeat, and the Japan Cup. Equinox was the world's highest-rated horse in 2023. He was voted Japanese Horse of the Year in 2022 and 2023. On 16 May 2025, Equinox was selected as the 38th inductee into Japan Racing Association Hall of Fame.

== Background ==
Equinox is out of the first crop of Kitasan Black. Kitasan Black, who was owned by enka singer Saburo Kitajima, won seven G1 races during his career. His dam was Chateau Blanche, a winner of the Mermaid Stakes. Her sire was the Takamatsunomiya Kinen winner King Halo.

Equinox was foaled at the Northern Farm in Abira, Hokkaido on March 23, 2019. He was owned by Silk Racing, an organization that offers stakes in horse ownership (Hitokuchi Banushi; Japanese: 一口馬主) for a total of 40 million yen (500 shares with each share sold for 80,000 yen), and was raised at Northern Farm Hayakita. According to the manager chief Yuki Kuwata, based on how his body grew as well as distance aptitude, the goal was set to be Kikuka Sho, the same race his sire won in 2015. He was later put to training with Tetsuya Kimura of Miho Training Center.

== Racing career ==
=== 2021: two-year old season ===
Equinox made his debut at a 1800 meter long maiden race on August 28 at Niigata Racecourse with Christophe Lemaire as his jockey. During the race, he moved into the lead on the final stretch, passing Circle of Life and the other horses, winning by six lengths. The acceleration Equinox showed surprised Kuwata, who had thought the horse was going to be more of a stayer.

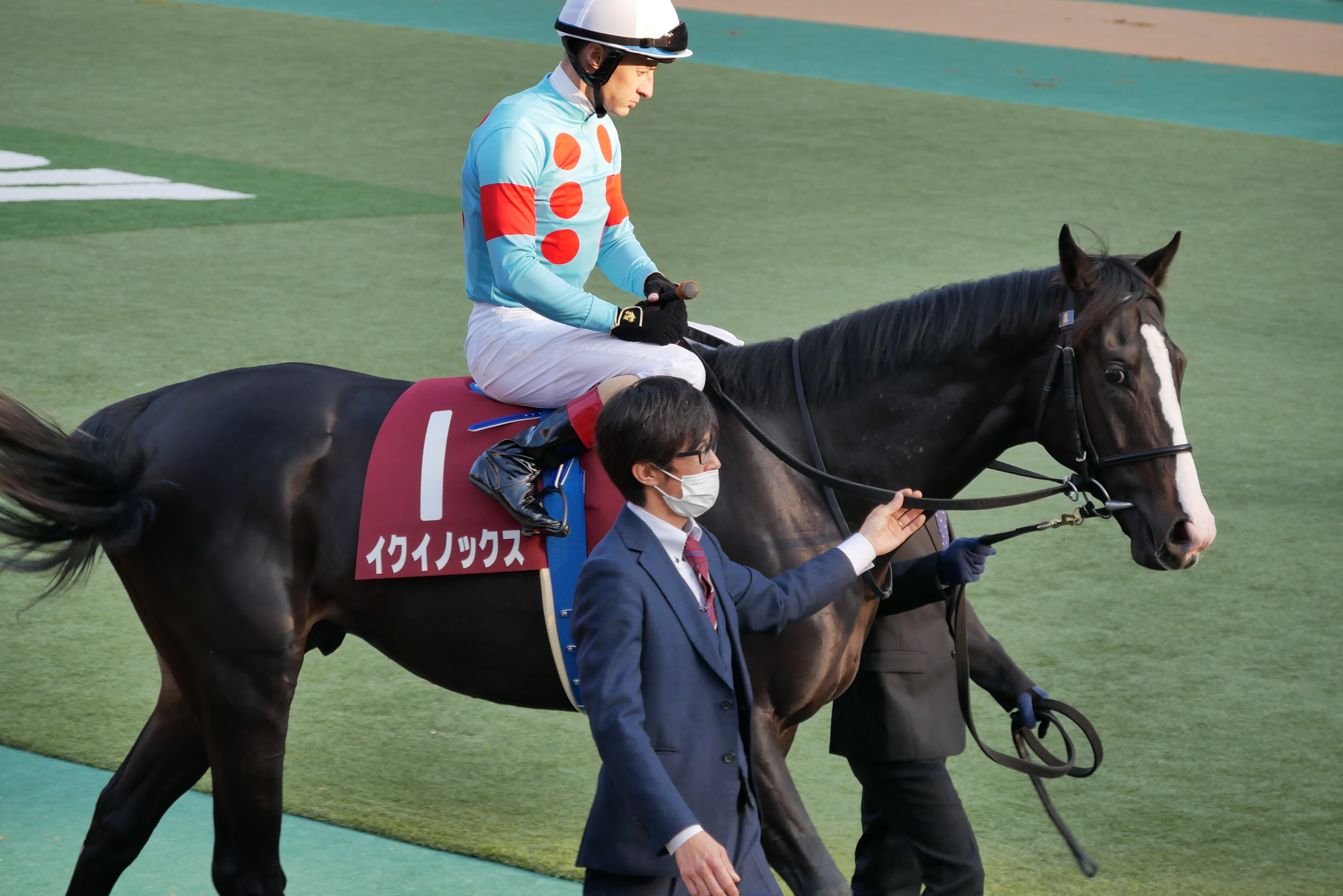
Equinox at the Tokyo Sports Nisai Stakes

Equinox's next race was the Tokyo Sports Hai Nisai Stakes (GII) held on November 20, where he was the most favoured. During the race, the horse stayed with the pack, only to pass the others on the final stretch with the record of 32.9 seconds for the final 3 furlongs (Note: The fastest-tied record to 2015's Smart Odin.。速度は18.24 [m/s]≒65.65 [km/h]) and winning his first group race. This also marked the first group race that a horse sired by Kitasan Black won.

=== 2022: three-year old season ===
As previously planned, Equinox did not use any trial races, and headed straight to Satsuki Sho as his first race of the season; which saw him take a 147 day long break. (Note: The trend of horses heading straight to, and winning, the Satsuki Sho without running in trial races were becoming a trend in the 2010s, but Equinox's case was described as a unique rotation on the Yushun。) At the Satsuki Sho, Equinox was the third favoured behind JRA Award for Best Two-Year-Old Colt winner Do Deuce and Tokinominoru Kinen winner Danon Beluga. Equinox started the race from the furthest gate, and came in to the final stretch in third place. He passed all the other horses but was passed by Geoglyph, who was also trained by Kimura, at the last second and came in second place。Equinox's jockey Lemaire commented that "it was after a long break, but he performed well. Since he started from the outside we couldn't create a wall, but we were able to make a winner. I think we have a big chance at the Derby".

Equinox then headed to the Tokyo Yushun (Japanese Derby) on May 29, where he was the 2nd most favoured behind Danon Beluga, who had come in 4th place at Satsuki Sho. He started the race third from last, and at the final stretch covered the last 3 furlongs at 33.6 seconds to close the gaps, but was beaten by Do Deuce by a neck. Lemaire remarked "I marked the winner on the stretch and tried to go after him as I went on the outside, but my opponent passed me back".

It was then announced that Equinox's next race would be the Autumn leg of the Tenno Sho. It was also announced that he had damaged his left foreleg at the Derby but was recovering well.

As announced, Equinox entered the Tenno Sho on October 30, where he started favourite. After making a good start, he was in the middle of the pack chasing Panthalassa, who was running at a high pace of 57.4 seconds/1000 meters. As the horse entered the final stretch, Lemaire urged the horse forward, catching Panthalassa at the last second, covering what Lemaire said was at least 15 lengths with the speed of 32.7 seconds over the last 3 furlongs, marking his first GI victory. This was the second year in a row, and the fifth ever, where a three-year old won the Autumn Tenno Sho, with Efforia being the previous year's winner. Equinox's win also marked the fastest win in any horse's career as he was the first horse to have won the race after running just five races, and also became the first flat G1 race of the season where the most favoured horse won the race, breaking the spell after 16 consecutive losses for the most favoured. Equinox's victory also marked the first GI victory of any Kitasan Black sire, and the fourth parent-child pair ever to win the same Autumn Tenno Sho Race. During the post-race interview Lemaire commented "Spring was unlucky for him, but I was able to show the true Equinox" and "this may be his first GI, but this won't be the last. I believe he can still win more GI titles".

It was then announced that his next race would be that year's Arima Kinen, to be held on December 25. Equinox gained many fan votes and gained a total of 294,688 votes, which was the third highest.

External videos
- The 2022 Arima Kinen race video from JRA's official YouTube channel

External videos
- The 2022 Arima Kinen race video from KanTere's official YouTube channel

At the Arima Kinen, Equinox was the most favoured. After the race began, he was in the rear of the pack that was chasing Titleholder. Just before the third corner Equinox started to move on to the outside, and started to pick up the pace as he made the fourth corner. At the final stretch, after Lemaire urged the horse to go faster, he picked up even more pace and crossed the finishing pole, not letting any other horses come near him. This victory marked the 21st horse ever to win the Arima as a three year old, and a second year in a row after Efforia last year. Equinox also became the third horse ever to win both the Tenno Sho (Autumn) and Arima as a three-year old, and the fastest ever for any horse to win the Arima with just six races to his career. This race also became the first Arima since 1994 for the top two to be won by a three-year old, as Boldog Hos was also a three-year old.

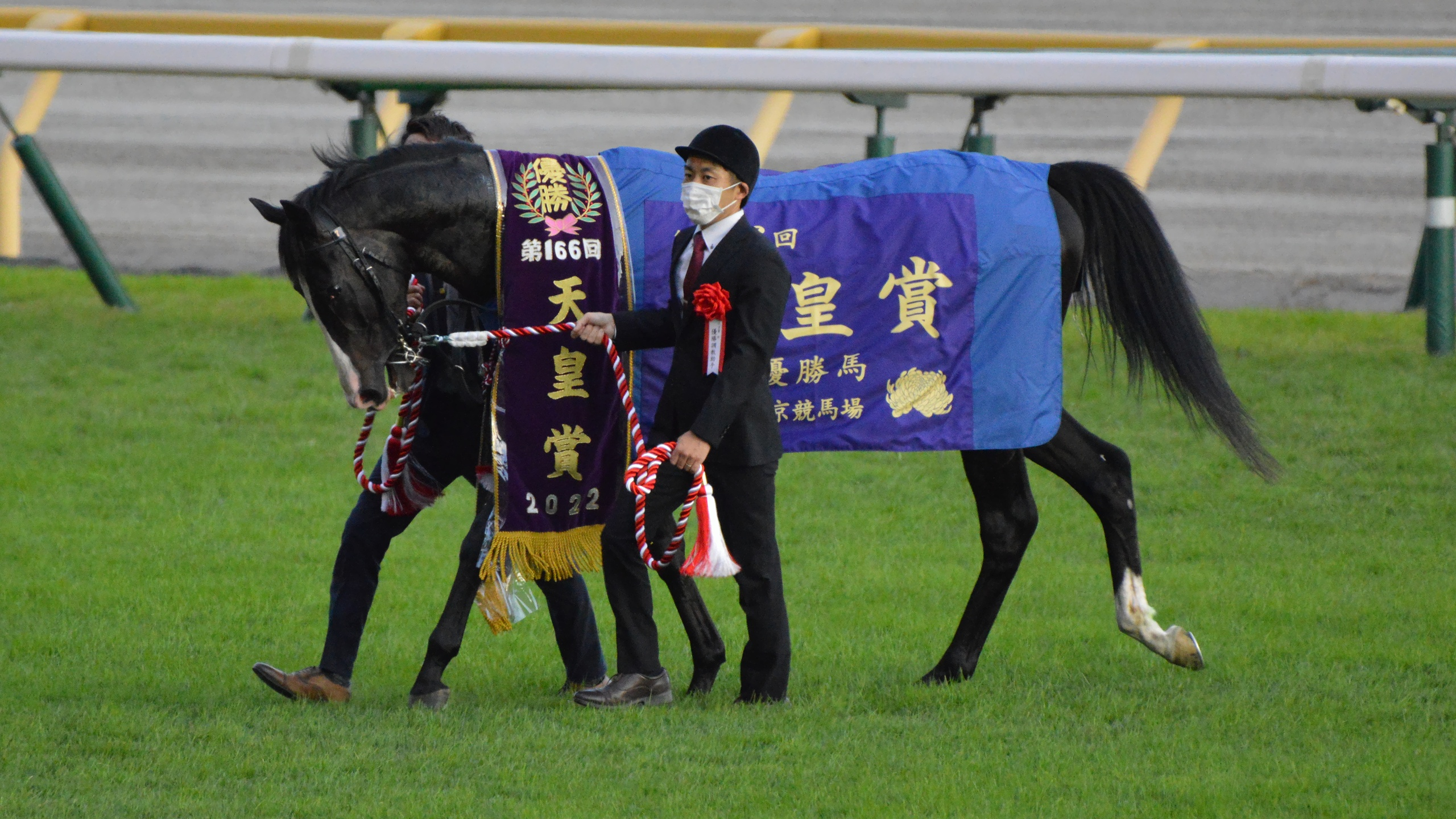
2022 Tenno Sho (Autumn)

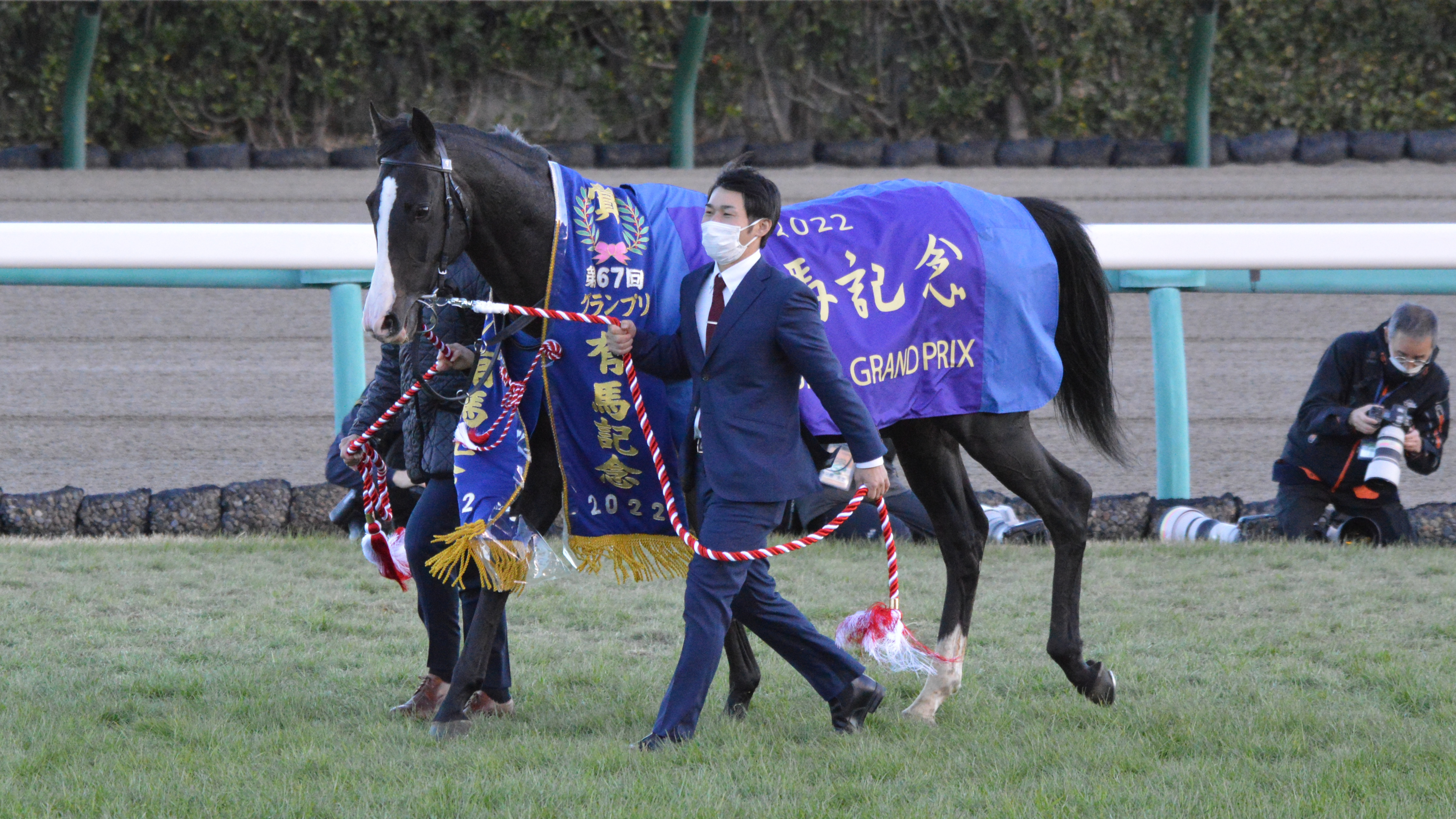
2022 Arima Kinen

=== 2023: four-year old season ===
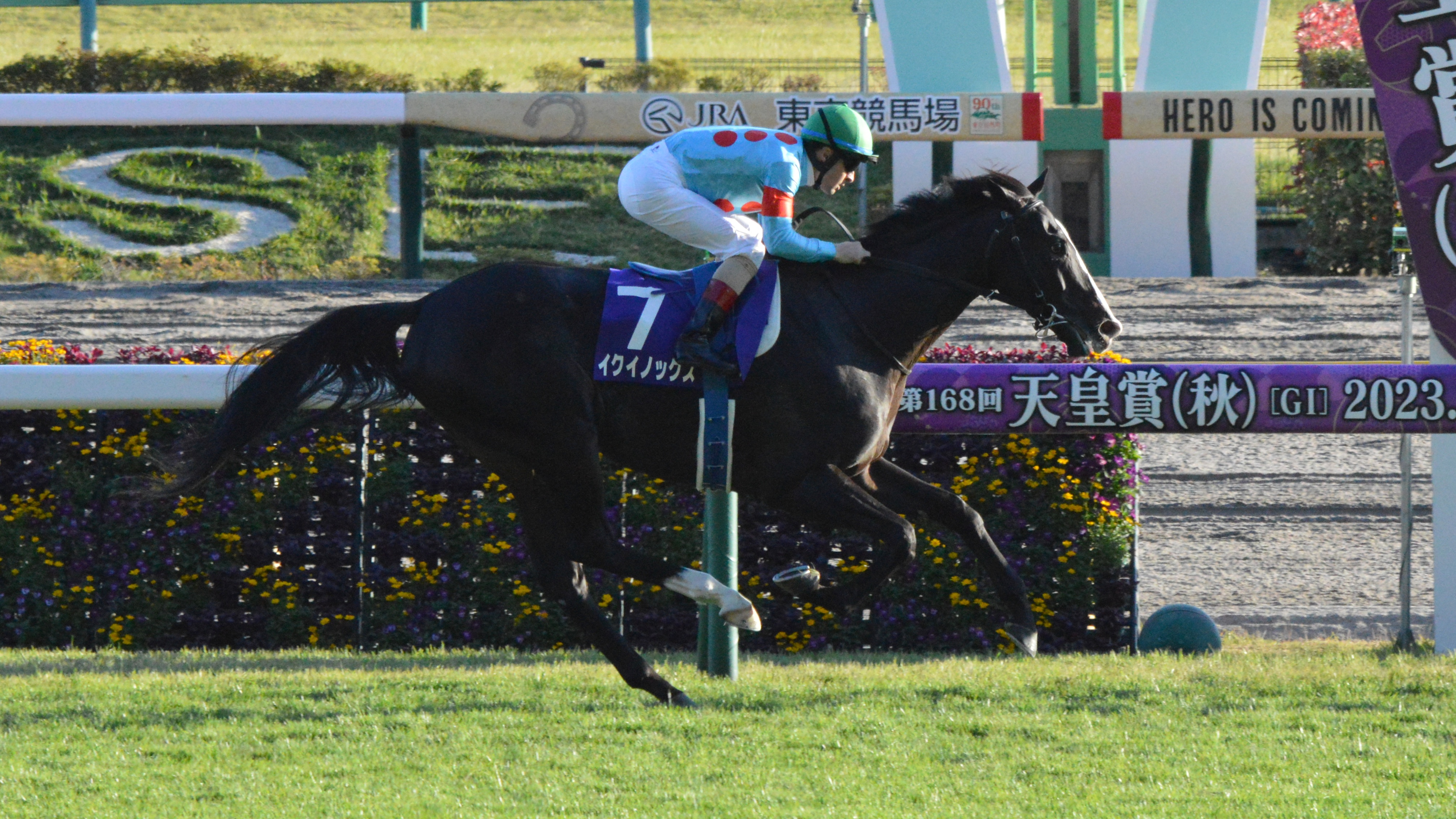
Equinox winning the Autumn Tenno Sho for the second year in a row

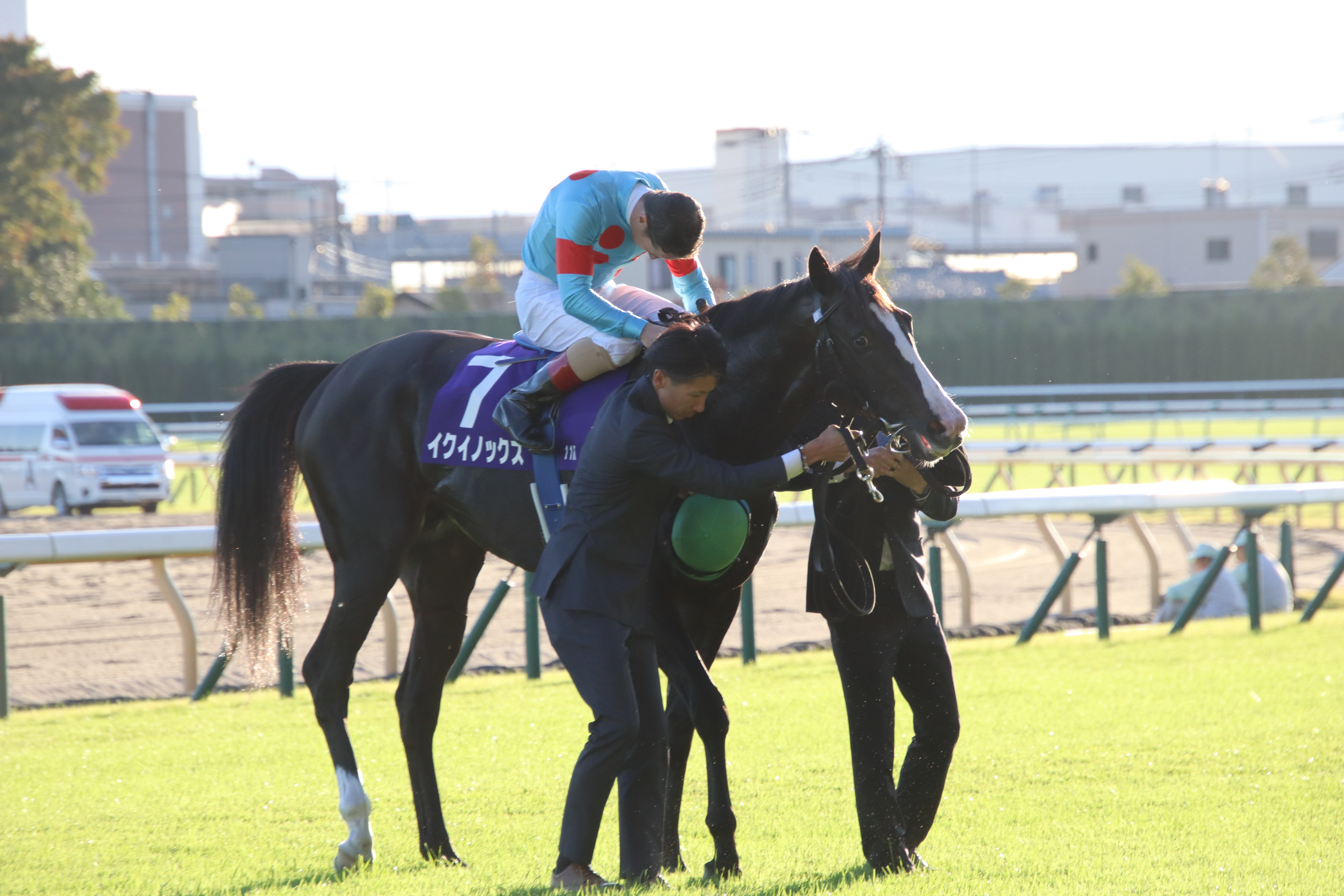
Christophe Lemaire bows his head to the Japanese Emperor who was in attendance

On January 17, the World's Best Racehorse Rankings of 2022 was announced, where Equinox was rated third at 126 pounds alongside Nature Strip, citing his two major victories the previous year as well as being named the Horse of the Year. As the 1st place (Flightline) and 2nd place (Baaeed) had both retired by this point, he became the de facto highest-rated active horse.

For his first race of the season, it was announced that they would go to the Dubai Sheema Classic, which would make it his first foreign race. Later, he was formally invited to enter the race, and the invitation was accepted.

In the race, Equinox for the first time in his career took the lead from the start and won with a track record time of 2:25.65. The win also marked the first foreign victory of any Kitasan Black offspring.

After the race, Lemaire commented, "I knew he was the greatest horse, and I'm very happy I was able to create this pace" and "This is the first time I won this race since Heart's Cry, who passed away two weeks ago. I would like to thank Equinox for making this opportunity to pay my tribute to him".

On April 14, the Longine World Best Racehorse Ranking (which tabulates all major races from that year up until April 9) was announced, and citing Equinox's 3 and a half length victory at Dubai, he was the highest rated horse at 129 pounds. This was the third time a Japanese-trained horse became the highest rated in the ranking, after 2014's Just A Way and 2016's A Shin Hikari.

On May 26, it was announced by Silk Racing that Equinox and Lemaire would head to the Takarazuka Kinen. A few days later, the CEO of Silk Racing, Masashi Yonemoto, also announced that the horse would ultimately head to the Japan Cup if his condition was good after Takarazuka. The official fan polling which was held in the lead-up to the Takarazuka Kinen had Equinox consistently leading, with the final tally at 216,379 votes.

On June 25, Equinox entered the Takarazuka Kinen as planned. The horse did not have a good start and briefly lost his balance but held through and ran in the rear of the pack. At the third corner, Equinox started to move to the outside and went forward to take the lead as he and the pack ran past the fourth corner, barely beating Through Seven Seas by a neck, marking his fourth consecutive win. This victory made Equinox the 16th horse to win both Grand Prixs (Arima and Takarazuka) and the 21st horse to earn more than 1 billion yen at JRA races as well as the fastest to earn as much with eight career races at that point.

After a summer break, it was announced by Silk Racing on September 18 that, before the Japan Cup, Equinox would race the Tenno Sho (Autumn) again, this time facing Do Deuce, who had beaten him at the Tokyo Yushun the year before.

On October 29, Equinox ran the early stage of the race from 3rd following Jack d'Or's high-paced run. As the pack entered the final stretch, Equinox quickly passed Jack d'Or and Gaia Force, and without letting Justin Palace catch up, he crossed the finishing line with a new world record of 1:55.2, marking his fifth consecutive GI win and becoming the third horse ever to win the Autumn Tenno Sho two years in a row. After the race, Lemaire praised his horse, saying, "I was relieved. Equinox is the greatest horse after all. Everyone in the world wanted to see him race. I was able to show Equinox's strength" and "Equinox has everything. He can take a good position from the start, and can run calmly after that, and can run well towards the end also. He also has stamina. He's a perfect horse". With this win, Equinox's total earnings in JRA races reached 1,252,692,000 yen, surpassing Contrail to become the 10th highest earner. If the earnings from the Dubai Sheema Classic were factored, the total earnings would reach 1,711,582,100 yen, surpassing Orfevre and becoming the 6th highest earner ever.

As previously announced, Equinox headed to the Japan Cup on November 26. During the race, Equinox placed himself third behind runners Panthalassa and Titleholder, before taking the lead as the pack entered the final stretch and beat Liberty Island by four lengths, clocking in at 2:21.8. This victory made Equinox the first ever horse to earn over 2-billion yen (2,215,446,100JPY), and also the third horse in JRA history to win six consecutive Grade I races in a row after T M Opera O and Lord Kanaloa.

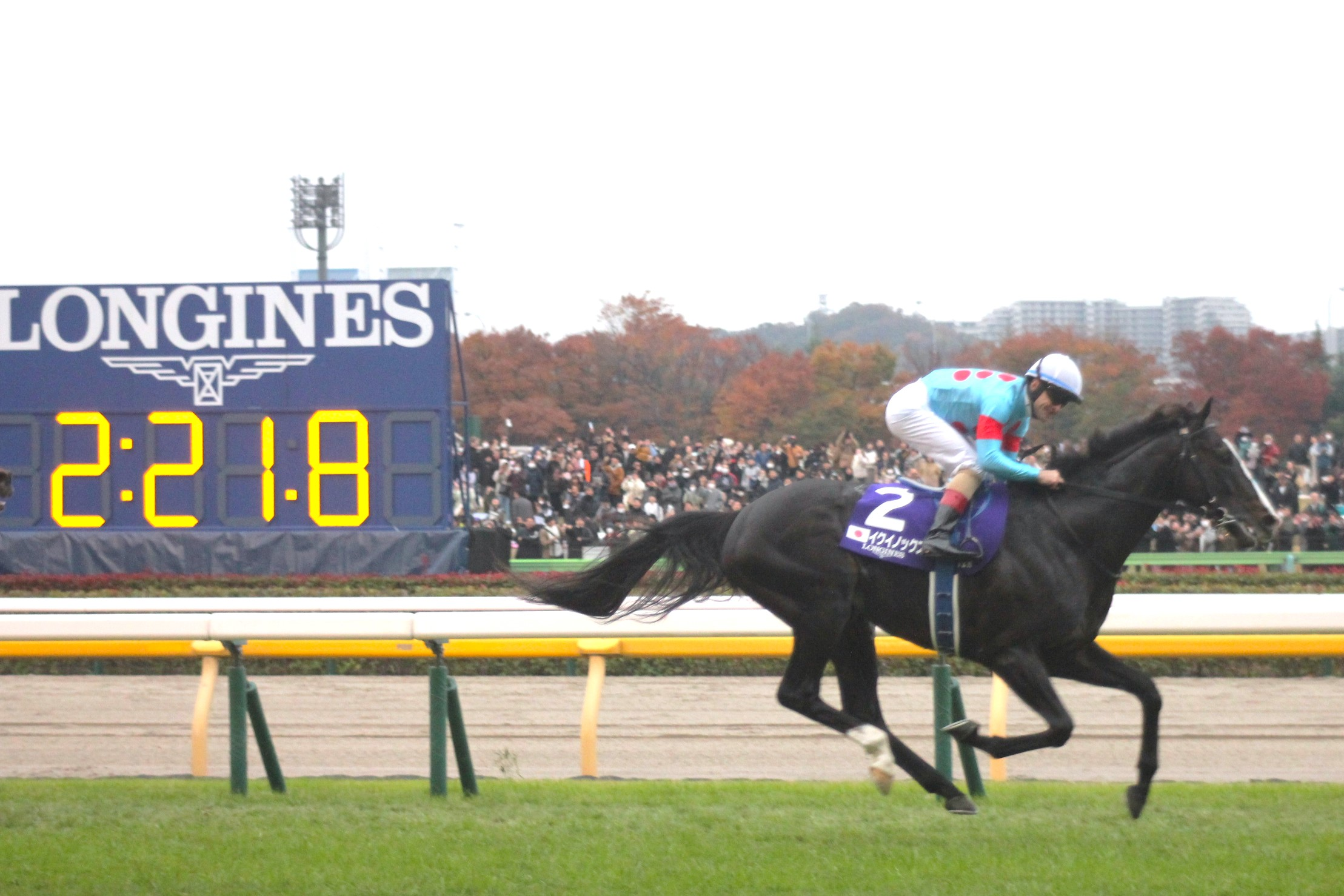
2023 Japan Cup

After the victory at the Japan Cup, discussions were made as to whether the horse should be entered in to the Arima Kinen or be retired to stud, with the head of Silk Racing quoted as saying all options were on the table; it was ultimately announced on November 30 that the horse will not be entered to Arima and will stand stud at the Shadai Stallion Station starting from 2024.

Upon Equinox's retirement, Kitasan Black's owner, Saburo Kitajima, made a statement to Nikkan Sports, celebrating and thanking the horse's career.

A retirement ceremony was held for Equinox on December 16 at Nakayama Racecourse, with the ceremony being streamed on the official YouTube channel of the JRA.

== Stud career ==
Equinox was sold to Shadai Stallion Station for 5 billion JPY upon becoming a stallion, and arrived at the farm on December 18. He was given a stable facing his sire, Kitasan Black. According to Keisuke Miwa, an employee at Shadai Stallion Station, "They have a great relationship," and "Equinox sees what his father does, and he behaves very similarly."

On December 7, Equinox's service fee for the 2024 season was announced to be at 20 million yen; which would be the same price as his sire for that season. This broke the previous record held by Deep Impact and Contrail's 12 million yen for the highest service fee of any first year sire.

In 2025, the first foals by Equinox, a colt out of Prix Penelope Grade 3 winner Camprock, and a filly out of the multiple Grade 2 winner La Force were born in January at Shiraoi farm and Northern Farm in Abira, Hokkaido, respectively. Also in 2025, three of the five most expensive foals at the JRHA Select Sale were progeny of Equinox. A colt out of champion American mare Midnight Bisou by Equinox sold for 580 million yen at the auction, which is the third highest price in the history of the JRHA Select Sale. Tetsuya Kimura, a potential trainer for the colt, told Idol Horse "If he can blend the strongest parts from both his father and his mother, he will be a very nice horse... I wouldn’t be surprised if he is a dirt horse and can have great success in the years ahead."

On February 1, 2026, 2022 Shuka Sho and 2024 Queen Elizabeth II Cup winner Stunning Rose gave birth to her first foal after her retirement; the foal is a filly by Equinox and features a blaze similar to that of her sire.

== Racing statistics ==
Below data is based on data available on JBIS Search, netkeiba.com, Emirates Racing Authority, and Total Performance Data.

Date	Course	Race	Grade	Distance (Condition)	Field	Odds (Favored)	Finish	Time	Winning (Losing) Margin	Jockey	Winner (2nd Place)	Ref
2021 – two-year-old season
Aug 28	Niigata	Two Year Old Debut		Turf 1800 m (Firm)	15	4.6 (2nd)	1st	1:47.4	6 lengths	Christophe Lemaire	(Men At Work)	
Nov 20	Tokyo	Tokyo Sports Hai Nisai Stakes	GII	Turf 1800 m (Firm)	12	2.6 (1st)	1st	1:46.2	2 1/2 lengths	Christophe Lemaire	(Asahi)	
2022 – three-year-old season
Apr 17	Nakayama	Satsuki Sho	GI	Turf 2000 m (Firm)	18	5.7 (3rd)	2nd	1:59.8	(1 length)	Christophe Lemaire	Geoglyph	
May 29	Tokyo	Tokyo Yushun	GI	Turf 2400 m (Firm)	18	3.8 (2nd)	2nd	2:21.9	(neck)	Christophe Lemaire	Do Deuce	
Oct 30	Tokyo	Tenno Sho (Autumn)	GI	Turf 2000 m (Firm)	15	2.6 (1st)	1st	1:57.5	1 length	Christophe Lemaire	(Panthalassa)	
Dec 25	Nakayama	Arima Kinen	GI	Turf 2500 m (Firm)	16	2.3 (1st)	1st	2:32.4	2 1/2 lengths	Christophe Lemaire	(Boldog Hos)	
2023 – four-year-old season
Mar 25	Meydan	Dubai Sheema Classic	GI	Turf 2410 m (Good)	10	1.4 (1st)	1st	R2:25.65	3 1/2 lengths	Christophe Lemaire	(Westover)	
Jun 25	Hanshin	Takarazuka Kinen	GI	Turf 2200 m (Firm)	17	1.3 (1st)	1st	2:11.2	neck	Christophe Lemaire	(Through Seven Seas)	
Oct 29	Tokyo	Tenno Sho (Autumn)	GI	Turf 2000 m (Firm)	11	1.3 (1st)	1st	R1:55.2	2 1/2 lengths	Christophe Lemaire	(Justin Palace)	
Nov 26	Tokyo	Japan Cup	GI	Turf 2400 m (Firm)	18	1.3 (1st)	1st	2:21.8	4 lengths	Christophe Lemaire	(Liberty Island)	

R in the chart and the time written in red indicates the horse finished in record time.

== Pedigree ==
Pedigree of Equinox (JPN), brown stallion, 2019
Sire Kitasan Black b. 2012	Black Tide d.b. 2001	Sunday Silence (USA)	Halo
Sire Kitasan Black b. 2012	Black Tide d.b. 2001	Sunday Silence (USA)	Wishing Well
Sire Kitasan Black b. 2012	Black Tide d.b. 2001	Wind in Her Hair (IRE)	Alzao (USA)
Sire Kitasan Black b. 2012	Black Tide d.b. 2001	Wind in Her Hair (IRE)	Burghclere (GB)
Sire Kitasan Black b. 2012	Sugar Heart b. 2005	Sakura Bakushin O	Sakura Yutaka O
Sire Kitasan Black b. 2012	Sugar Heart b. 2005	Sakura Bakushin O	Sakura Hagoromo
Sire Kitasan Black b. 2012	Sugar Heart b. 2005	Otome Gokoro	Judge Angelucci (USA)
Sire Kitasan Black b. 2012	Sugar Heart b. 2005	Otome Gokoro	Tizly (USA)
Dam Chateau Blanche b. 2010	King Halo b. 1995	Dancing Brave (USA)	Lyphard
Dam Chateau Blanche b. 2010	King Halo b. 1995	Dancing Brave (USA)	Navajo Princess
Dam Chateau Blanche b. 2010	King Halo b. 1995	Goodbye Halo (USA)	Halo
Dam Chateau Blanche b. 2010	King Halo b. 1995	Goodbye Halo (USA)	Pound Foolish
Dam Chateau Blanche b. 2010	Blancherie b. 1998	Tony Bin (IRE)	Kampala (GB)
Dam Chateau Blanche b. 2010	Blancherie b. 1998	Tony Bin (IRE)	Seven Bridge (GB)
Dam Chateau Blanche b. 2010	Blancherie b. 1998	Maison Blanche	Alleged (USA)
Dam Chateau Blanche b. 2010	Blancherie b. 1998	Maison Blanche	Blanche Reine (FR) (Family: 16-b)

- Equinox was inbred 4x4 to Halo, meaning that this stallion appears twice in the fourth generation of his pedigree.
