= Sapporo Nisai Stakes =

Sapporo Nisai Stakes 札幌2歳ステークス
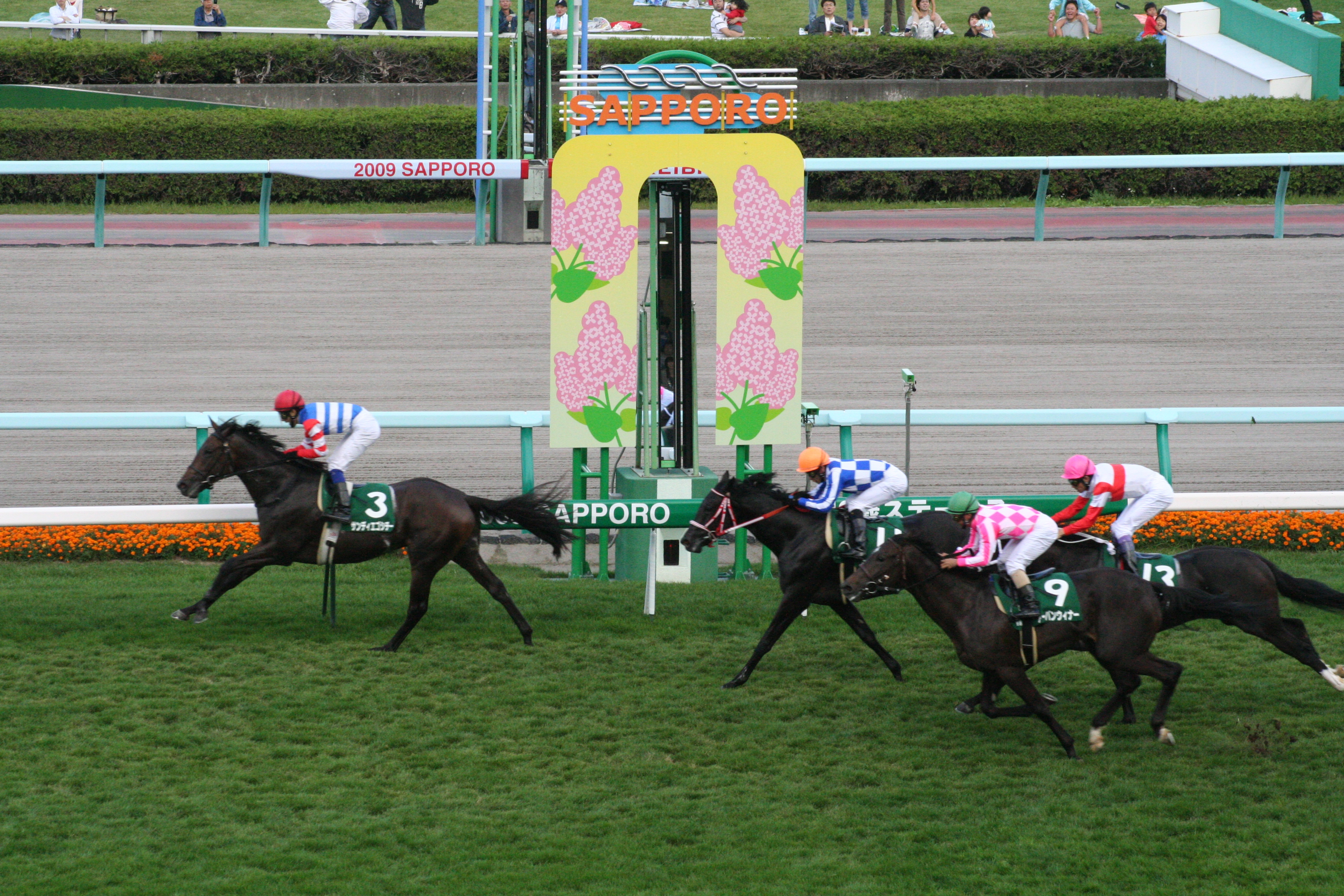
- The finish of the 2009 Sapporo Nisai Stakes
- Class: Grade 3
- Location: Sapporo Racecourse
- Inaugurated: 1966
- Race type: Thoroughbred Flat racing

Race information
- Distance: 1800 metres
- Surface: Turf
- Track: Right-handed
- Qualification: 2-y-o
- Weight: 55 kg
- Purse: ¥ 66,860,000 (as of 2025): 1st: ¥ 31,000,000; 2nd: ¥ 12,000,000; 3rd: ¥ 8,000,000

The Sapporo Nisai Stakes (Japanese 札幌2歳ステークス) is a Grade 3 horse race in Japan for two-year-old Thoroughbreds run in late August or early September over a distance of 1800 metres at Sapporo Racecourse.

The race was first run in 1966 and was promoted to Grade 3 status in 1984. Originally run over 1200 metres, the race was increased to its current distance in 1997. It was run at Hakodate Racecourse in 1989. Past winners have included Jungle Pocket, Admire Moon, Logi Universe and Sodashi.

== Winners since 2000 ==
Year	Winner	Jockey	Trainer	Owner	Time
2000	Jungle Pocket	Teruhiko Chida	Sakae Watanabe	Yomoji Saito	1:49.6
2001	Yamano Blizzard	Hiroto Kawashima	Kawada Takayoshi	Yoshihiro Yamaizumi	1:50.9
2002	Sakura President	Katsuharu Tanaka	Futoshi Kojima	Sakura Commerce	1:51.7
2003	Moere Espoir	Tsuyoshi Chiba	Yoshinori Doyama	Kazuo Nakamura	1:54.1
2004	Stormy Cafe	Hirofumi Shii	Futoshi Kojima	Kyoko Nishikawa	1:49.9
2005	Admire Moon	Masaru Honda	Hiroyoshi Matsuda	Riichi Kondo	1:50.4
2006	Namura Mars	Yusuke Fujioka	Nobuharu Fukushima	Nobushige Namura	1:49.7
2007	Oriental Rock	Yutaka Take	Hidetaka Tadokoro	Rumiko Tanaami	1:51.9
2008	Logi Universe	Norihiro Yokoyama	Kiyoshi Hagiwara	Masaaki Kumeta	1:49.1
2009	San Diego City	Yusuke Fujioka	Seiji Sakuta	Yushun Horse Club	1:49.7
2010	All As One	Katsumi Ando	Masaozo Ryoke	Junzo Miyagawa	1:49.8
2011	Grandezza	Shinichiro Akiyama	Osamu Hirata	Shadai Race Horse	1:50.8
2012	Codino	Norohiro Yokoyama	Kazuo Fujisawa	Sunday Racing	1:48.5
2013	Red Reveur	Keita Tosaki	Naosuke Sugai	Tokyo Horse Racing	1:59.7
2014	Bright Emblem	Hironobu Tanabe	Shigeyuki Kojima	Silk	1:50.0
2015	Admire Eikan	Yasunari Iwata	Naosuke Sugai	Riichi Kondo	1:50.8
2016	Trust	Daichi Shibata	Hiroaki Kawazu	Shigeyuki Okada	1:49.9
2017	Rock This Town	Christophe Lemaire	Yoshitaka Ninomiya	Sunday Racing	1:51.4
2018	Nishino Daisy	Masaki Katsuura	Noboru Takagi	Shigeyuki Nishiyama	1:50.1
2019	Black Hole	Yukito Ishikawa	Ikuo Aizawa	Seiichi Serizawa	1:50.4
2020	Sodashi	Hayato Yoshida	Naosuke Sugai	Kaneko Makoto Holdings	1:48.2
2021	Geoglyph	Christophe Lemaire	Takaki Iwato	Sunday Racing	1:49.1
2022	Dura	Arata Saito	Yasuyuki Takahashi	Cypress Holdings	1:50.0
2023	Set Up	Takeshi Yokoyama	Yuichi Shikato	Ken Shimada	1:50.5
2024	Magic Sands	Daisuke Sasaki	Naosuke Sugai	Sunday Racing	1:50.3
2025	Shonan Gulf	Kenichi Ikezoe	Naosuke Sugai	Tetsuhide Kunimoto	1:50.6
2026	Shonan Galleon	Katsuma Sameshima	Shizuya Kato	Tetsuhide Kunimoto	1:50.3

== Earlier winners ==
- 1966 - Ryuzuki
- 1967 - Kitano Diao
- 1968 - Bourbone
- 1969 - High Prince
- 1970 - Lone One
- 1971 - Tomoe O
- 1972 - Yushio
- 1973 - Colonel Symboli
- 1974 - Prosperous
- 1975 - Kami Ichi
- 1976 - Hishi Speed
- 1977 - Lovely Tosho
- 1978 - Teruno Eight
- 1979 - Katsu Rookie O
- 1980 - Big Desire
- 1981 - Kochi Osho
- 1982 - Max Fire
- 1983 - Sea Black
- 1984 - Western Five
- 1985 - Kalista Kaiser
- 1986 - Gal Dancer
- 1987 - Miyono Speed
- 1988 - Miyono Gold
- 1989 - Inter Voyager
- 1990 - Scarlet Bouquet
- 1991 - Nishino Flower
- 1992 - T M Hurricane
- 1993 - Mellow Fruit
- 1994 - Prime Stage
- 1995 - Biwa Heidi
- 1996 - Seiryu O
- 1997 - I Am The Prince
- 1998 - Meiner Platinum
- 1999 - Meiner Condor

== See also ==
- Horse racing in Japan
- List of Japanese flat horse races
