= Mejiro Ryan =

Japanese-bred Thoroughbred racehorse

Mejiro Ryan メジロライアン
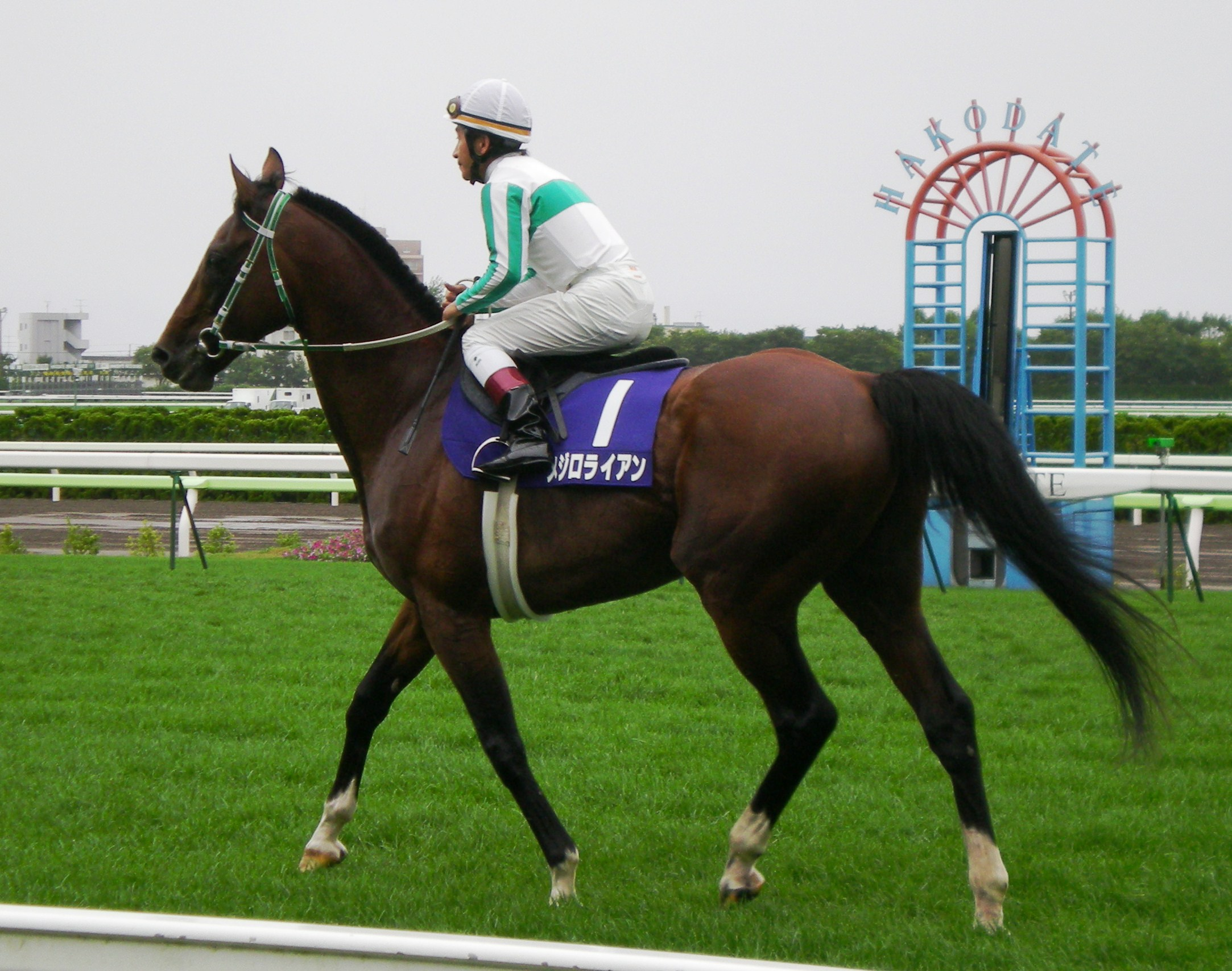
- Mejiro Ryan at Hakodate Racecourse.
- Breed: Thoroughbred
- Sire: Amber Shadai
- Grandsire: Northern Taste
- Dam: Mejiro Chaser
- Damsire: Mejiro Samman
- Sex: Stallion
- Foaled: April 11, 1987
- Died: March 17, 2016 (aged 28)
- Country: Japan
- Colour: Bay
- Breeder: Mejiro Stud
- Owner: Mejiro Stud
- Racing colours
- Trainer: Shinji Okuhira
- Jockey: Norihiro Yokoyama
- Record: 19: 7-4-3
- Earnings: ¥492,040,400

Major wins
- Yayoi Sho (1990); Kyoto Shimbun Hai (1990); Takarazuka Kinen (1991); Nikkei Sho (1992)

Mejiro Ryan (Japanese: メジロライアン, Hepburn: Mejiro raian; April 11, 1987 – March 17, 2016) was a Japanese Thoroughbred racehorse and sire. He was a top competitor during his classic year and placed in the podium in each of his Classic Triple Crown races despite not winning any of them. This was the first time this feat had been done since Umeno Chikara in 1964. His biggest win is the 1991 Takarazuka Kinen. He also won Yayoi Sho and Kyoto Shimbun Hai in 1990 and ended his racing career by winning the Nikkei Sho in 1992.

== Background ==
Mejiro Ryan was foaled out of Mejiro Chaser, who won three races in 26 starts. He was sired by Amber Shadai, the winner of Arima Kinen in 1981 and Tenno Sho (Spring) in 1983. Amber Shadai himself was sired by Northern Taste, the leading sire in Japan for ten years between 1982 until 1992.

His name was a combination of the crown name "Mejiro" from Mejiro Stud with Nolan Ryan, A baseball hall of famer pitcher with the most strikeouts in Major League Baseball history.

== Racing career ==
=== 1989: two-year-old season ===
Mejiro Ryan made his debut on July 9. The debut happened in a 1200 metres turf race in Hakodate. He struggled in this debut and could not keep running in a straight line despite finishing second. His next race also not giving a fruitful return as he finished sixth and was out for the next two months from an injury due to Periostitis. He came back on October 29 in a 1400 metres maiden turf race at Kyoto. Being ridden by Norihiro Yokoyama this time, his attitude of veering off course did not change which resulted in finishing third.

From this point, Yokoyama became his main jockey. This worked out well for him as he won his next race by staying behind early on and surging late near the end. The jockey was switched again in the next race and finished fifth before he went back to Yokoyama for his career's sixth race. With the same strategy as his first win, he got his second career win by overtaking all his competitors in the final straight. Two wins in six races form managed to convince the owner to register him for The Classics.

=== 1990: three-year-old season ===
The first race of the season would be the Yayoi Sho on March 4. The race was held on a poor track due to rain from the previous day. His biggest rival for the race would be Ines Fujin, who had just won the Asahi Hai Sansai Stakes as well as the previous year’s best two-year-old colt. Ines Fujin, a well-known front runner started at his favoured position at the beginning of the race, whilst Mejiro Ryan stayed comfortable at the back. In the straight, Ines Fujin avoided the rough inside track and tried to move to the outside. Meanwhile, Mejiro Ryan made a run on the inside, broke away from the pack and passed Ines Fujin from the inside with 200 metres remaining to take the lead. He proceeded to sprint in the final straight, passing Tsurumaru Mimata O and took his first graded stakes win. This win qualified him for the big race, the Satsuki Sho. In this race, Mejiro Ryan waited from the inside for majority of the time, but unlike the previous race, he could not catch up to Ines Fujin who ran early, as well as the eventual winner, Haku Taisei who positioned himself well in the final phase. Mejiro Ryan ended up finishing third that day, three quarters behind those two.

Onto the next classic (Tokyo Yushun), Haku Taisei ran forward early but Ines Fujin managed to surpass him for the lead, and Mejiro Ryan stayed mostly at the back. While Ines Fujin ran at a medium pace, Mejiro Ryan moved to the outside from the third corner and began to close the gap. He accelerated more at the final straight but ended up short at the line by one and a half lengths behind the winner, Ines Fujin. This derby famously racked up a total of 196,517 spectators, which was considered the most attended in the Tokyo stands. Mejiro Ryan then took a summer break and was scheduled to return for the Hakodate Kinen, but ended up twisting his legs which extended his rest period. The next race he joined was the Kyoto Shimbun Hai, a trial race for the Kikuka Sho. This race turned out well for him as he was in the middle of the pack from the start. From the outside, he showed a finishing kick, overtaking all his competitors and winning his second graded race. Columnist Shunji Nagai, wrote of the horse’s performance, saying Mejiro Ryan “surpassed his competitors with an impression that he still has more power inside him". Mejiro Ryan set a record on that day as well.

He gained an automatic berth to Kikuka Sho with this win. The subsequent injuries for both Haku Taisei and Ines Fujin made Mejiro Ryan as the favourite for the race. In this race, he also competed with Mejiro McQueen, his stablemate for the first time. As usual, he started from the back of the pack but advanced a bit more to the middle as the race progressed. At the second lap, he moved outside to pursue an advantage and chased down Mejiro McQueen. Unfortunately, the favourite gassed out near the end, finishing in third more than two and a half lengths behind Mejiro McQueen and White Stone. Despite the loss, Mejiro Ryan became the first horse to finish within the top three for all three classic races without winning either of them since Umeno Chikara in 1964. In the Arima Kinen vote, Mejiro Ryan gained 116,982 total votes and placed fourth in the standings which qualified him for that season ending race. When the race began, Osaichi George took charge early on and set a very slow pace in the early phase. In the final corner, Oguri Cap (of which this would be his final race), surged forward and overtook Osaichi George. Mejiro Ryan and White Stone chased after Oguri Cap, but neither caught up as they were three and half lengths behind. White Stone and Mejiro Ryan fought for second place in which Mejiro Ryan snatched it by a neck. Yokoyama who was his main jockey reminisced, "I thought I could make a clear pass, but Oguri's stamina was superior."

=== 1991: four-year-old season ===
Mejiro Ryan started his season in Nakayama Kinen on March 10. He started well but failed to maintain his tempo in a slow pace set up by the eventual winner, Yukino Sunrise and placed second. Regardless of having a fever, he competed in the Tenno Sho (Spring) on April 28. By this time, Mejiro Ryan alongside Mejiro McQueen and White Stone were recognised as the successors to the Heisei "Three Strong", when the trio were put in the same bracket and had single digit odds for this race. Mejiro Ryan managed to get a good start from the inside gate at the beginning, and positioned himself at the back as usual. Another Mejiro, Mejiro Palmer, surged forward to take the lead in the early phase. At the third corner of the final lap, McQueen surpassed Palmer to take the lead and subsequently won the race, while Ryan was unable to break away from the pack and fell behind to fourth place.

Mejiro Ryan’s next race was the Takarazuka Kinen, which was held at the Kyoto Racecourse over Hanshin’s due to the latter undergoing renovation. This time, Mejiro McQueen was the favourite ahead of Mejiro Ryan and White Stone. Mejiro Ryan started fast. At the first lap, he ran in the middle of the pack, then, between the first and second corners, he made contact with other horses and showed signs of speeding up. Yokoyama noticed this and decided not to interfere. Mejiro Ryan proceeded to overtake Iide Saturn, who was leading the pack, and White Stone, who was in second place during the downhill slope at the third corner. This maneuver resulted in continuing through the final corner for the lead. Mejiro Ryan then avoided the rough inside of the track and managed to get outside, pulling away from the rest of the pack at the final straight. He crossed the finish line in first place beating Mejiro McQueen who was closing in from the outside by a length and a half. This win marked his first G1 victory after six attempts. The one-two finish between Ryan and McQueen is a repeat of a 1971 race when Mejiro Musashi defeated Mejiro Asama to the finish line. After winning the run, Yokoyama left the arena, took off his helmet and bowed to the stands as a sign of respect and honour to his father, Yokoyama Tokio, who was Mejiro Musashi’s jockey twenty years prior.

Mejiro Ryan spent his summer resting and preparing at Hakodate, but developed mild leg discomfort and tendonitis on his front, right leg. For the 1991 Arima Kinen fan poll, he placed fourth with 114,216 votes. The poll qualified him for another attempt at the event, but finished at a disappointing twelfth place.

=== 1992: five-year-old season ===
In January, he returned and competed in the American Jockey Club Cup. He performed poorly, finishing in sixth place out of eleven runners. Two months later, he ran in the Nikkei Sho. The ground was of low quality and heavy but he manage to start well; moved up and chased, snatching the lead at the final corner. In the straight, he chose the inside lane where track conditions are generally considered poor, but managed to pull away from the others to win the race two and a half lengths ahead of the rest. This marked his fourth graded stakes win and his first win in three races.

His tendonitis injury recurred after the Nikkei Sho and was forced to rest again. The team aimed him for the Tenno Sho (Autumn) but his condition was not good enough. Due to the concern of this recurring injury, the team decided to retire him from racing. His retirement ceremony occurred on October 25.

== Stud record and death ==
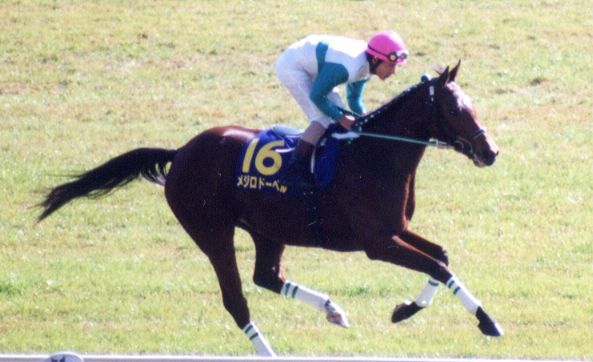
Mejiro Dober

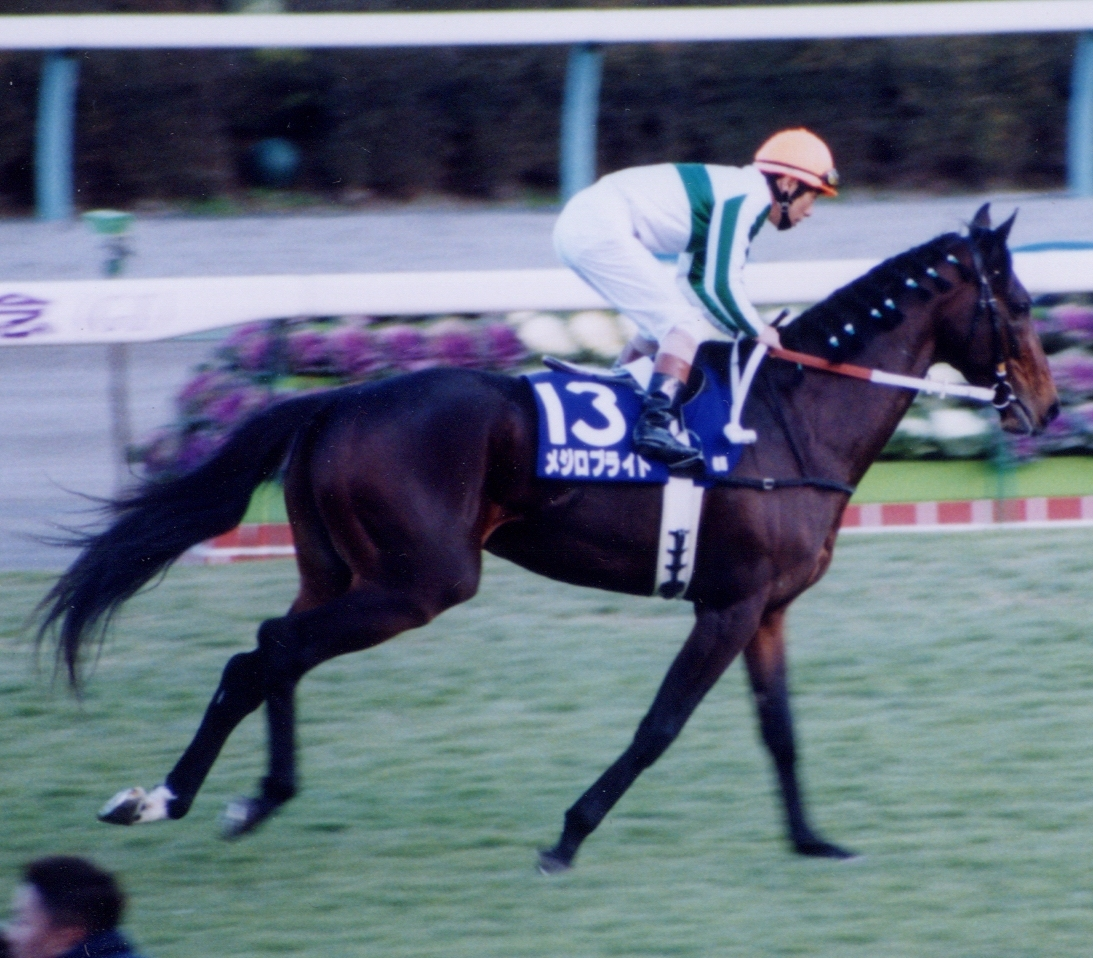
Mejiro Bright

Since Mejiro Ryan was owned by Mejiro Stud, a farm with both breeding and racing business at that time, he stayed mostly in that farm as a stud. He was a successful stud, siring five-time G1 winner, Mejiro Dober and 1998 Tenno Sho (Spring) winner, Mejiro Bright. He retired as a stud in 2007.

When Mejiro Ranch closed in 2011, Lake Villa Farm took control of his well-being as a retired horse. Mejiro Ryan died due to old age on 17 March 2016.

=== Notable progeny ===
The data below is based on JBIS Stallion Reports.

c = colt, f = filly, g = gelding

bold = grade 1 stakes

**Foaled**	**Name**	**Sex**	**Major Wins**
1994	Mejiro Dober	f	**Hanshin Sansai Himba Stakes, Yushun Himba, Shuka Sho, Queen Elizabeth II Cup (twice),** Sankei Sho All Comers, Fuchu Himba Stakes
1994	Mejiro Bright	c	Radio Tampa Hai Sansai Stakes, Kyodo News Service Hai Yonsai Stakes, Sports Nippon Sho Stayers Stakes, American Jockey Club Cup, **Tenno Sho (Spring),** Hanshin Daishoten, Nikkei Shinshun Hai
1994	Air Guts	c	Radio Tampa Sho
1996	Mejiro Ronzan	c	Tokyo High Jump, Tokyo Autumn Jump
1997	Toho Dream	c	Sankei Osaka Hai
1997	Win Blaze	c	Kabutoyama Kinen, Fukushima Kinen, Naruo Kinen
2001	Mejiro Basinger	f	Niigata Jump Stakes
2002	Skip Jack	g	Keio Hai Nisai Stakes
2005	Let's Go Kirishima	c	Sekiya Kinen

== In popular culture ==
An anthropomorphized version of Mejiro Ryan appears as a character in the Japanese multimedia franchise Umamusume: Pretty Derby, voiced by Afumi Hashi. She is depicted as a sporty, tomboyish, and dependable girl who loves strength training, weightlifting, and professional sports outside of racing, but also harbors a secret love for romance manga and wishes to look more feminine. Her race outfit has motifs resembling a baseball uniform as a reference to her real-life namesake, Major League Baseball player Nolan Ryan. She gets easily flustered over things related to her secret hobbies, such as public displays of affection. She makes an appearance as a major character in the spin-off series Umamusume: Cinderella Gray.

== Racing form ==
Mejiro Ryan won seven races out of 19 starts. The data available is based on JBIS and netkeiba. All the races were on turf.

Date	Age	Track	Name	Grade	Distance (Condition)	Field	Finished	Time	Jockey	Winner (2nd Place)
Jul 9, 1989	2	Hakodate	2YO debut		1200m (Firm)	6	2nd	1:12.4	Masatsugu Kashiwazaki	San M.Grundy
Jul 22, 1989	2	Hakodate	2YO debut		1200m (Firm)	8	6th	1:12.5	Masatsugu Kashiwazaki	Makihata Big
Oct 29, 1989	2	Kyoto	2YO maiden		1400m (Firm)	11	3rd	1:24.9	Norihiro Yokoyama	North Hill O
Nov 18, 1989	2	Tokyo	2YO maiden		1600m (Good)	8	1st	1:37.5	Norihiro Yokoyama	(Daiwa Houston)
Dec 3, 1989	2	Nakayama	Habotan Sho		2000m (Firm)	11	5th	2:03.2	Tomio Yasuda	Premier
Dec 23, 1989	2	Nakayama	Hiiragi Sho		1600m (Firm)	15	1st	1:35.4	Norihiro Yokoyama	(Tomoe Joyner)
Jan 20, 1990	3	Nakayama	Junior Cup	OP	2000m (Good)	9	1st	2:04.6	Norihiro Yokoyama	(Premier)
Mar 4, 1990	3	Nakayama	Yayoi Sho	2	2000m (Heavy)	14	1st	2:05.4	Norihiro Yokoyama	(Tsurumaru Mimata O)
Apr 15, 1990	3	Nakayama	Satsuki Sho	1	2000m (Firm)	18	3rd	2:02.5	Norihiro Yokoyama	Haku Taisei
May 27, 1990	3	Tokyo	Tokyo Yushun	1	2400m (Firm)	22	2nd	2:25.5	Norihiro Yokoyama	Ines Fujin
Oct 14, 1990	3	Kyoto	Kyoto Shimbun Hai	2	2200m (Soft)	15	1st	R2:12.3	Norihiro Yokoyama	(Global Ace)
Nov 4, 1990	3	Kyoto	Kikuka Sho	1	3000m (Soft)	17	3rd	3:06.6	Norihiro Yokoyama	Mejiro McQueen
Dec 23, 1990	3	Nakayama	Arima Kinen	1	2500m (Firm)	16	2nd	2:34.3	Norihiro Yokoyama	Oguri Cap
Mar 10, 1991	4	Nakayama	Nakayama Kinen	2	1800m (Firm)	11	2nd	1:47.9	Norihiro Yokoyama	Yukino Sunrise
Apr 28, 1991	4	Kyoto	Tenno Sho (Spring)	1	3200m (Firm)	18	4th	3:19.3	Norihiro Yokoyama	Mejiro McQueen
Jun 9, 1991	4	Kyoto	Takarazuka Kinen	1	2200m (Firm)	10	1st	2:13.6	Norihiro Yokoyama	(Mejiro McQueen)
Dec 22, 1991	4	Nakayama	Arima Kinen	1	2500m (Firm)	15	12th	2:32.0	Norihiro Yokoyama	Dai Yusaku
Jan 26, 1992	5	Nakayama	American Jockey Club Cup	2	2200m (Firm)	11	6th	2:13.6	Norihiro Yokoyama	Tosho Falco
Mar 22, 1992	5	Nakayama	Nikkei Sho	2	2500m (Soft)	11	1st	2:38.3	Norihiro Yokoyama	(Carib Song)

- R indicates a finish with a record time

== Pedigree ==
Pedigree of Mejiro Ryan
Sire Amber Shadai	Northern Taste	Northern Dancer	Nearctic
Sire Amber Shadai	Northern Taste	Northern Dancer	Natalma
Sire Amber Shadai	Northern Taste	Lady Victoria	Victoria Park
Sire Amber Shadai	Northern Taste	Lady Victoria	Lady Angela
Sire Amber Shadai	Clear Amber	Ambiopoise	Ambiorix
Sire Amber Shadai	Clear Amber	Ambiopoise	Bull Poise
Sire Amber Shadai	Clear Amber	One Clear Call	Gallant Man
Sire Amber Shadai	Clear Amber	One Clear Call	Europa
Dam Mejiro Chaser	Mejiro Samman	Charlottesville	Prince Chevalier
Dam Mejiro Chaser	Mejiro Samman	Charlottesville	Noorani
Dam Mejiro Chaser	Mejiro Samman	Paradisea	Aureole
Dam Mejiro Chaser	Mejiro Samman	Paradisea	Chenille
Dam Mejiro Chaser	Cheryl	Snob	Mourne
Dam Mejiro Chaser	Cheryl	Snob	Senones
Dam Mejiro Chaser	Cheryl	Chanel	Pan
Dam Mejiro Chaser	Cheryl	Chanel	Barley Corn (Family 8-c)

- Mejiro Ryan is an inbred by 4 x 5 to Lady Angela (Nearctic's dam), 5 x 5 to Nearco (Nearctic's and Noorani's sire), 5 x 5 x 5 to Hyperion (Lady Angela's, Aureole's and Barley Corn's sire) and 5 x 5 to Bull Lea (Bull Poise's and Europa's sire)
