= Tesco Boy =

British-bred Thoroughbred racehorse

- Breed: Thoroughbred
- Sire: Princely Gift
- Grandsire: Nasrullah
- Dam: Suncourt
- Damsire: Hyperion
- Sex: Stallion
- Foaled: 1963
- Died: 25 October 1987 (aged 24)
- Country: Great Britain
- Colour: Dark bay
- Breeder: Ridgewood Stud
- Owner: Jack Cohen
- Trainer: Staff Ingham
- Record: 11: 5-2-3

Major wins
- Queen Anne Stakes (1966)

Awards
- Leading sire in Japan (1974–75, 1978–81)
- Last updated on September 30, 2025

Tesco Boy (1963 – 25 October 1987) was a British thoroughbred racehorse and sire. While only moderately successful in racing, he became a major breeding sire in Japan in the 1970s and was on six occasions the leading sire in the country.

== Overview ==
Tesco Boy was foaled in 1963. He was owned by Sir Jack Cohen, the founder of Tesco, who named the horse after the supermarket chain. As a race horse, Tesco Boy started in 11 races, winning five. His most notable result was a win in the 1966 Queen Anne Stakes, while also taking victories in lesser races, such as the Rose of York Stakes. He also placed in the Sussex Stakes, Queen Elizabeth II Stakes, and Champion Stakes the same year.

Tesco Boy was retired from racing in 1967, and was initially sent to stud in Ireland. At the end of 1967, he was exported to Japan to stand stud at the Hidaka Light Stallion Agricultural Cooperative's Monbestu Stud Farm in the Hokkaido region. In Japan, Tesco Boy saw massive success as a sire and became a major part of the Japanese horse racing bloodline. In six different years, Tesco Boy was the leading sire in Japan and his offspring would win nearly all of Japan's major races. Included among his most notable progeny are Kitano Kachidoki, Tosho Boy, Tesco Gaby, and Hagino Kamui O, all of whom won major races that would later be considered Grade 1 when grading was introduced to horse racing. Tosho Boy himself also became a successful sire after his racing career. As a broodmare sire, Tesco Boy was also highly successful, with his daughters producing such successful race horses as Ines Fujin, the 1990 Tōkyō Yūshun winner, Trot Thunder, the 1996 Yasuda Kinen and Mile Championship winner, and Nehai Caesar, the 1994 Autumn Tenno Sho winner. He is also the grandsire of Mr. C. B., who won the Japanese Triple Crown in 1983.

Another of Tesco Boy's grandsons, Sakura Bakushin O, became a successful sire in his own right, and Tesco Boy's bloodline continues in the 21st century mainly through descendants of Sakura Bakushin O. This includes Kitasan Black, of whom Sakura Bakushin O is the damsire of.

Tesco Boy died on 25 October 1987, aged 24.

== Notable progeny ==
c = colt, f = filly, g = gelding

bold = grade 1 stakes (or equivalent prior to grading)

Foaled	Name	Sex	Major Wins
1968	Lord David	c	1972 Rosebery Handicap
1968	Rotisserie	f	1971 Fred Darling Stakes
1968	Super Honey	f	1971 Princess Elizabeth Stakes
1968	Whats-a-Name	f	1970 Testimonial Stakes
1969	Kamino Chidori	f	1974 Himba Tokyo Times Hai (Nakayama)
1969	Land Prince	c	1972 **Satsuki Shō**
1970	Fujino Takawashi	c	1974 Swan Stakes
1970	Rinne Rund	f	1974 Himba Tokyo Times Hai (Tokyo)
1970	Yama Tesco	f	1973 Niigata Kinen
1971	Kitano Kachidoki	c	1973 **Hanshin Sansai Stakes**, Daily Hai Nisai Stakes, 1974 **Satsuki Shō**, **Kikuka-shō**, Kyoto Shimbun Hai, Spring Stakes, Kobe Shimbun Hai, Kisaragi Sho, 1975 Yomiuri Milers Cup
1971	Western Dash	c	1975 Nikkan Sports Sho Kimpai,
1972	Raijin	c	1974 **Hanshin Sansai Stakes**
1972	Tesco Gaby	f	1974 Keio Hai Nisai Stakes, 1975 **Yushun Himba**, **Oka Sho**, Fillies' Revue, Keisei Hai
1972	Three Flam	c	1975 Kisaragi Sho
1973	Furokan Boy	c	1977 Swan Stakes
1973	Hokuto Boy	c	1976 Hanshin Daishōten, 1977 **Tenno Sho (autumn)**, Kyoto Kinen, Asahi Challenge Cup, 1979 Swan Stakes
1973	Tosho Boy	c	1976 **Satsuki Shō**, **Arima Kinen**, Kyoto Shimbun Hai, Kobe Shimbun Hai, 1977 **Takarazuka Kinen**, Takamatsunomiya Kinen
1974	Daiwa Tesco	f	1977 Hanshin Himba Stakes,
1974	Three Fire	f	1978 Kinko Sho, Hankyu Hai, 1979 Kitakyushu Kinen, Chunichi Shimbun Hai
1975	Inter Gushiken	c	1978 **Kikuka-shō**, NHK Hai, Kisaragi Sho, 1979 Kyoto Kimpai
1975	Oyama Tesco	f	1978 **Oka Sho**
1975	Tanino Tesco	f	1981 Hanshin Himba Stakes
1976	Horsemen Tesco	f	1979 **Oka Sho**
1976	Marry Joy	f	1980 CBC Sho, Kinko Sho
1977	Lindo Taiyo	c	1979 **Asahi Hai Sansai Stakes**, 1980 Tokyo Yonsai Stakes
1978	Agnes Tesco	f	1981 **Queen Elizabeth II Cup**, Kobe Shimbun Hai
1978	Calstone Tesco	f	1983 Hanshin Himba Stakes
1978	Takeno Dia	f	1980 Keio Hai Nisai Stakes
1979	Hagino Kamui O	c	1982 Kyoto Shimbun Hai, Spring Stakes, Kobe Shimbun Hai, 1983 **Takarazuka Kinen**, Takamatsunomiya Kinen, Swan Stakes
1981	Sette Juno	f	1987 Niigata Daishoten
1982	Dokan Tesco	c	1986 Sprinters Stakes
1982	Sakura Yutaka O	c	1985 Kyodo Tsushin Hai, 1986 **Tenno Sho (autumn)**, Mainichi Okan, Sankei Osaka Hai
1983	Pot Tesco Lady	f	1986 Hanshin Himba Stakes, 1987 Swan Stakes, Kyoto Himba Stakes

=== Broodmare sire ===
Tesco Boy is also the broodmare sire of several grade-1 winning horses. These horses include the following:

- Bamboo Atlas, 1982 Tōkyō Yūshun
- Kushiro King, 1986 Spring Tenno Sho
- Gold City, 1986 Hanshin Sansai Stakes
- Ines Fujin, 1989 Asahi Hai Sansai Stakes and 1990 Tōkyō Yūshun
- Isono Roubles, 1991 Yushun Himba
- Trot Thunder, 1995 Mile Championship and 1996 Yasuda Kinen
- Nehai Caesar, 1994 Autumn Tenno Sho
- Daitaku Yamato, 2000 Sprinters Stakes
- Erimo Chic, 1997 Queen Elizabeth II Cup
- Narita Homare, 1998 Derby Grand Prix

== Pedigree ==
Pedigree of Tesco Boy (GBR), Dark Bay, 1963
Sire Princely Gift (GBR) 1951	Nasrullah (GBR); 1940	Nearco (ITA); 1935	Pharos (GBR); 1920
Sire Princely Gift (GBR) 1951	Nasrullah (GBR); 1940	Nearco (ITA); 1935	Nogara (ITA); 1928
Sire Princely Gift (GBR) 1951	Nasrullah (GBR); 1940	Mumtaz Begum (FRA); 1932	Blenheim (GBR); 1927
Sire Princely Gift (GBR) 1951	Nasrullah (GBR); 1940	Mumtaz Begum (FRA); 1932	Mumtaz Mahal (GBR); 1921
Sire Princely Gift (GBR) 1951	Blue Gem (GBR); 1943	Blue Peter (GBR); 1936	Fairway (GBR); 1925
Sire Princely Gift (GBR) 1951	Blue Gem (GBR); 1943	Blue Peter (GBR); 1936	Fancy Free (GBR); 1924
Sire Princely Gift (GBR) 1951	Blue Gem (GBR); 1943	Sparkle (GBR); 1935	Blandford (IRE); 1919
Sire Princely Gift (GBR) 1951	Blue Gem (GBR); 1943	Sparkle (GBR); 1935	Gleam (GBR); 1926
Dam Suncourt (GBR) 1952	Hyperion (GBR); 1930	Gainsborough (GBR); 1915	Bayardo (GBR); 1906
Dam Suncourt (GBR) 1952	Hyperion (GBR); 1930	Gainsborough (GBR); 1915	Rosedrop (GBR); 1907
Dam Suncourt (GBR) 1952	Hyperion (GBR); 1930	Selene (GBR); 1919	Chaucer (GBR); 1900
Dam Suncourt (GBR) 1952	Hyperion (GBR); 1930	Selene (GBR); 1919	Serenissima (GBR); 1913
Dam Suncourt (GBR) 1952	Inquisition (GBR); 1936	Dastur (GBR); 1929	Solario (GBR); 1922
Dam Suncourt (GBR) 1952	Inquisition (GBR); 1936	Dastur (GBR); 1929	Friar's Daughter (GBR); 1921
Dam Suncourt (GBR) 1952	Inquisition (GBR); 1936	Jury (GBR); 1929	Hurry On (GBR); 1913
Dam Suncourt (GBR) 1952	Inquisition (GBR); 1936	Jury (GBR); 1929	Trustful (IRE) (Family:19); 1924
