= Trot Thunder =

Japanese Thoroughbred racehorse

Trot Thunder トロットサンダー
- Breed: Thoroughbred
- Sire: Dyna Cosmos
- Grandsire: Huntercombe
- Dam: La Seine Wonder
- Damsire: Tesco Boy
- Sex: Stallion
- Foaled: 10 May 1989
- Died: November 2004 (aged 15)
- Country: Japan
- Color: Bay
- Breeder: Flat Bokujo
- Owner: Teruo Fujimoto
- Racing colours
- Trainer: Katsutoshi Aikawa
- Jockey: Norihiro Yokoyama
- Record: 22: 15-2-2
- Earnings: ¥364,361,000

Major wins
- Mile Championship (1995); Yasuda Kinen (1996); Tokyo Shimbun Hai (1996)

Trot Thunder (トロットサンダー, Hepburn: Torotto Sanda, 10 May 1989 – November 2004) was a retired Japanese Thoroughbred racehorse. He ran on a total of 22 races and won 15 of them, notably the Mile Championship in 1995 and the Yasuda Kinen in the following year. He made a total of 364,361,000 JPY during his racing career.

== Background ==
Trot Thunder is a bay horse sired by Dyna Cosmos, the 1986 Satsuki Shō winner. His dam, La Seine Wonder, is a daughter of Tesco Boy, a British racehorse who was the leading sire in Japan six times. He was born on May 10, 1989, on the Flat Bokujo.

== Racing Record ==
In Trot Thunder's racing career, he started competing in dirt (regional) races before transitioning into turf (central). Although he did not win in any G2 races, he won two G1 race and one G3 race. The table below shows the available data from netkeiba and JBIS about his racing career.

Date	Race	Grade	Distance	Surface	Track	Entry	Finish	Time	Margin	Jockey	Winner (Runner-up)
1992 – three-year-old season
Jul 1	3YO		1400m	Dirt	Urawa	10	1st	1:28.9	-0.4	Momoi Juushiaki	(Wonder Slugger)
Jul 29	3YO		1400m	Dirt	Urawa	9	1st	1:28.8	-1.8	Mitsuo Honma	(Macaw Ruby)
Aug 17	3YO		1400m	Dirt	Urawa	6	1st	1:29.2	-1.0	Momoi Juushiaki	(Musashi Wonder)
Sep 8	Tokubetsu (3YO)		1400m	Dirt	Urawa	6	1st	1:28.2	-0.6	Momoi Juushiaki	(Mitaka Dancer)
Oct 10	3YO & Up		1400m	Dirt	Urawa	11	1st	1:27.2	-0.7	Momoi Juushiaki	(Sea Gull Record)
1993 – four-year-old season
Jan 3	3YO & Up		1400m	Dirt	Urawa	10	2nd	1:29.4	0.1	Mitsuo Honma	Cosmo Chu
Jan 21	3YO & Up		1400m	Dirt	Urawa	11	1st	1:29.1	-0.3	Mitsuo Honma	(Heisei Sovereign)
Feb 21	Tokubetsu (3YO & Up)		1600m	Dirt	Urawa	9	1st	1:42.9	-0.1	Mitsuo Honma	(Ishino Hawaiian)
1994 – five-year-old season
May 23	Tokubetsu (3YO & Up)		1600m	Dirt	Urawa	9	1st	1:40.6	-0.8	Momoi Juushiaki	(Hashimo Kurataka)
Jul 17	Hidaka Tokubetsu		1800m	Turf	Sapporo	10	2nd	1:48.7	0.1	Norihiro Yokoyama	Takeno Crown
Dec 4	Miho Tokubetsu		1800m	Turf	Nakayama	14	1st	1:47.7	0.0	Norihiro Yokoyama	(Meiner Rockabilly)
1995 – six-year-old season
Jan 21	Hatsufuji Stakes		1600m	Turf	Nakayama	14	1st	1:33.6	-0.3	Norihiro Yokoyama	(Quadrifoglio)
Mar 12	Nakayama Kinen	G2	1800m	Turf	Nakayama	12	7th	1:50.8	0.5	Norihiro Yokoyama	Fujiyama Kenzan
May 20	Fuchu Stakes		1600m	Turf	Tokyo	18	1st	1:33.8	-0.4	Norihiro Yokoyama	Shinko King
Jul 2	Sapporo Kinen	G3	2000m	Turf	Sapporo	13	7th	2:01.8	0.4	Norihiro Yokoyama	Super Play
Aug 20	Hakodate Kinen	G3	2000m	Turf	Hakodate	16	7th	2:03.4	1.0	Norihiro Yokoyama	Inter My Way
Oct 8	Mainichi Ōkan	G2	1800m	Turf	Tokyo	14	3rd	1:48.9	0.5	Norihiro Yokoyama	Sugano Oji
Oct 28	Ireland Trophy	OP	1600m	Turf	Tokyo	11	1st	1:33.3	-0.5	Norihiro Yokoyama	(Air Chariot)
Nov 19	Mile Championship	G1	1600m	Turf	Kyoto	18	1st	1:33.7	-0.2	Norihiro Yokoyama	(Meisho Tesoro)
1996 – seven-year-old season
Feb 4	Tokyo Shimbun Hai	G3	1600m	Turf	Tokyo	16	1st	1:34.4	-0.1	Norihiro Yokoyama	(Meisho Yushi)
May 11	Keio Hai Spring Cup	G2	1400m	Turf	Tokyo	15	3rd	1:21.2	0.1	Norihiro Yokoyama	Heart Lake
Jun 9	Yasuda Kinen	G1	1600m	Turf	Tokyo	17	1st	1:33.1	0.0	Norihiro Yokoyama	(Taiki Blizzard)

== Pedigree ==
Pedigree of Trot Thunder, bay horse, 1989
Sire Dyna Cosmos b. 1983	Huntercombe dk.b. 1967	Derring-Do	Darius
Sire Dyna Cosmos b. 1983	Huntercombe dk.b. 1967	Derring-Do	Sipsey Bridge
Sire Dyna Cosmos b. 1983	Huntercombe dk.b. 1967	Ergina	Fair Trial
Sire Dyna Cosmos b. 1983	Huntercombe dk.b. 1967	Ergina	Ballechin
Sire Dyna Cosmos b. 1983	Shadai Worden ch. 1997	Northern Taste	Northern Dancer
Sire Dyna Cosmos b. 1983	Shadai Worden ch. 1997	Northern Taste	Lady Victoria
Sire Dyna Cosmos b. 1983	Shadai Worden ch. 1997	Shadai Prima	Marino
Sire Dyna Cosmos b. 1983	Shadai Worden ch. 1997	Shadai Prima	Night and Day
Dam La Seine Wonder ch. 1969	Tesco Boy dk.b. 1963	Princely Gift	Nasrullah
Dam La Seine Wonder ch. 1969	Tesco Boy dk.b. 1963	Princely Gift	Blue Gem
Dam La Seine Wonder ch. 1969	Tesco Boy dk.b. 1963	Suncourt	Hyperion
Dam La Seine Wonder ch. 1969	Tesco Boy dk.b. 1963	Suncourt	Inquisition
Dam La Seine Wonder ch. 1969	La Seine ch. 1956	Limbo	War Admiral
Dam La Seine Wonder ch. 1969	La Seine ch. 1956	Limbo	Boojie
Dam La Seine Wonder ch. 1969	La Seine ch. 1956	Rush Ford	Athford
Dam La Seine Wonder ch. 1969	La Seine ch. 1956	Rush Ford	Rush Mor
