= Ines Fujin =

Japanese-bred Thoroughbred racehorse

Ines Fujin アイネスフウジン
- Breed: Thoroughbred
- Sire: Sea Hawk
- Grandsire: Herbager
- Dam: Tesco Pearl
- Damsire: Tesco Boy
- Sex: Stallion
- Foaled: April 10, 1987
- Died: April 5, 2004 (aged 16)
- Country: Japan
- Colour: Dark Bay
- Breeder: Kozo Nakamura
- Owner: Masaaki Kobayashi
- Racing colours
- Trainer: Shuho Kato
- Jockey: Eiji Nakano
- Record: 8: 4-3-0
- Earnings: ¥244,400,000

Major wins
- Asahi Hai Sansai Stakes (1989); Kyodo News Service Hai Yonsai Stakes (1990); Japanese Classic Race wins: Tokyo Yūshun (1990)

Awards
- JRA Award for Best Two-Year-Old Colt (1989); JRA Award for Best Three-Year-Old Colt (1990)

Ines Fujin (Japanese: アイネスフウジン, Hepburn: Ainesu Fuujin; 10 April 1987 – 5 April 2004) was a Japanese Thoroughbred racehorse and sire. He participated in 8 races in 1989 and 1990, participating in G1 races as a two-year-old colt, and climbing from G1 races as a three-year-old colt, placing first in 4 of them.

Ines Fujin died on April 5, 2004 at the Saito Farm in Osaki, Miyagi due to volvulus.

== Appearance ==
Ines Fujin was a dark brown horse with a small white irregular star on his forehead. He often raced in a light colored blinker hood.

== Background ==
Ines Fujin was bred in Japan by breeder Kozo Nakamura, and sired by Sea Hawk, who was a thoroughbred racehorse that raced in G2 and G3 races. He was owned by Masaaki Kobayashi, trained by Shuho Kato, and jockeyed by Eiji Nakano.

Ines Fujin won the JRA Awards for Best Two-Year-Old Colt in 1989 and Best Three-Year-Old Colt in 1990.

== Racing career ==
=== 1989: two-year-old season ===
Ines Fujin participated in four races as two-year-old colt. The first two were 1600 meter newcomer races, where he placed second in both. The third was a maiden race, also 1600 meters, where he placed first of 8. The fourth and final race of his two-year-old season was the Asahi Hai Futurity Stakes 1600 meter event, where he placed first of 15.

=== 1990: three-year-old season ===
Ines Fujin began his three-year-old colt series in the 1800 meter Kyodo Tsushin Hai event, where he placed first of 8 horses. He was promoted to Grade II and participated in the Yayoi Sho 2000 meter event, placing fourth of 14. This race promoted him to Grade I, where he participated in the G1 Satsuki Sho and Japan Derby, coming second and first of 18 and 22 respectively. In this Japan Derby, 196,517 people visited in the Tokyo Racecourse. This number of visitors is recognized as a world record, but this record has not yet been updated. Ines Fujin retired as a racehorse after suffering from tendonitis not long after the derby.

== Racing statistics ==
Ines Fujin raced in 8 races in which he won 4 races (including 2 Group 1 wins) and finished in runner up in 3 races. This data is based on JBIS Search and netkeiba.com.

Date	Racecourse	Race	Grade	Distance (condition)	Weather	Entry	HN	Odds (Favored)	Finish	Time	Margins	Jockey	Winner (Runner-up)
1989 – two-year-old season
Sep 10	Nakayama	2YO Debut		1,600 m (Firm)	Sunny	11	8	4.5 (2)	2nd	1:36.1	0.8	Eiji Nakano	Fujimi Waimea
Sep 27	Nakayama	2YO Debut		1,600 m (Soft)	Cloudy	8	4	1.3 (1)	2nd	1:35.5	0.0	Eiji Nakano	Kanesho Knight
Oct 22	Tokyo	2YO Maiden		1,600 m (Firm)	Sunny	8	1	1.5 (1)	1st	1:36.0	–0.3	Eiji Nakano	(Taifu Oza)
Dec 17	Nakayama	Asahi Hai Sansai Stakes	1	1,600 m (Firm)	Sunny	15	8	11.5 (5)	1st	1:34.4	–0.4	Eiji Nakano	(Sakura Saezuri)
1990 – three-year-old season
Feb 11	Tokyo	Kyodo News Service Hai Yonsai Stakes	3	1,800 m (Firm)	Rainy	8	1	1.7 (1)	1st	1:49.5	–0.5	Eiji Nakano	(Wild Fire)
Mar 4	Nakayama	Hochi Hai Yayoi Sho	2	2,000 m (Heavy)	Sunny	14	8	1.9 (1)	4th	2:05.8	0.4	Eiji Nakano	Mejiro Ryan
Apr 15	Nakayama	Satsuki Sho	1	2,000 m (Firm)	Cloudy	18	2	4.1 (1)	2nd	2:02.2	0.0	Eiji Nakano	Haku Taisei
May 27	Tokyo	Tokyo Yushun	1	2,400 m (Firm)	Sunny	22	12	5.3 (3)	1st	R2:25.3	–0.2	Eiji Nakano	(Mejiro Ryan)

Legend:
*R indicated that it was a record finish time.

== Stud career ==
Ines Fujin's most successful sire was Fast Friend, who won the Teio Sho and Tokyo Daishoten in 2000.

f = filly

bold = grade 1 stakes (GI/JpnI)

**Foaled**	**Name**	**Sex**	**Major Wins**
1994	Fast Friend	f	Tokai Stakes, **Teio Sho, Tokyo Daishoten**

== In popular culture ==
An anthropomorphized version of Ines Fujin appears as a character in the Japanese multimedia franchise Umamusume: Pretty Derby, previously voiced by Tomomi Mineuchi until her retirement from voice acting in 2022 followed by Rika Nagae. She is depicted as a responsible, hardworking girl who was born to a poor family, which references how her real-life counterpart's farm went bankrupt early in his life, and is devoted to repaying her family's kindness for enrolling her in Tracen Academy by becoming an exceptional racer. She works many part-time jobs to support them and her younger twin sisters, and extends this same caring disposition as a "big sister" to her classmates.

== Pedigree ==
Pedigree of Ines Fujin (JPN), 1987
Sire Sea Hawk	Herbager	Vandale	Plassy
Sire Sea Hawk	Herbager	Vandale	Vanille
Sire Sea Hawk	Herbager	Flagette	Escamillo
Sire Sea Hawk	Herbager	Flagette	Fidgette
Sire Sea Hawk	Sea Nymph	Free Man	Norseman
Sire Sea Hawk	Sea Nymph	Free Man	Fantine
Sire Sea Hawk	Sea Nymph	Sea Spray	Ocean Swell
Sire Sea Hawk	Sea Nymph	Sea Spray	Pontoon
Dam Tesco Pearl	Tesco Boy	Princely Gift	Nasrullah
Dam Tesco Pearl	Tesco Boy	Princely Gift	Blue Gem
Dam Tesco Pearl	Tesco Boy	Suncourt	Hyperion
Dam Tesco Pearl	Tesco Boy	Suncourt	Inquisition
Dam Tesco Pearl	Mutsumi Pearl	Montaval	Norseman
Dam Tesco Pearl	Mutsumi Pearl	Montaval	Ballynash
Dam Tesco Pearl	Mutsumi Pearl	Masaryu	Tosa Midori
Dam Tesco Pearl	Mutsumi Pearl	Masaryu	Yukishiki (Family: 4-d)
