= Haiseiko =

Japanese-bred Thoroughbred racehorse

Haiseiko ハイセイコー
- Haiseiko at the 1973 Satsuki Sho.
- Breed: Thoroughbred
- Sire: China Rock
- Grandsire: Rockefella
- Dam: Haiyu
- Damsire: Karim
- Sex: Stallion
- Foaled: 1970
- Country: Japan
- Colour: Bay
- Breeder: Takeda Bokujo
- Owner: Oyu; Horseman Club
- Racing colours
- Trainer: Masami Ito; Katsutaro Suzuki
- Jockey: Sueo Masuzawa
- Record: 22: 13-4-2
- Earnings: 219,539,600 Yen

Major wins
- Seiun Sho (1972); Yayoi Sho (1973); Spring Stakes (1973); NHK Hai (1973); Nakayama Kinen (1974); Takarazuka Kinen (1974); Takamatsunomiya Hai (1974); Japanese Classic Race wins: Satsuki Sho (1973)

Awards
- Yushun Public Prize (1973)

Honours
- Japan Racing Association Hall of Fame (1984); Statue at Nakayama Racecourse, Oi Racecourse & Niikappu, Hokkaido; Haiseiko Kinen at Oi Racecourse

Haiseiko (Japanese: ハイセイコー, Hepburn: Haiseikō; March 6, 1970 – May 4, 2000) was a Japanese Thoroughbred racehorse and sire. He rose to national fame during the 1970s, becoming a beloved idol horse whose popularity was described as a social phenomenon. After his rise to popularity, he was famously nicknamed "The Monster of Local Racing." He played a leading role in sparking Japan's first major horse racing boom. In 1984, he was honored with induction into the Japan Racing Association Hall of Fame.

== Background ==
Haiseiko was born in 1970 (Showa 45) at Takeda Farm in Niikappu, Hokkaido, under the jurisdiction of Hidaka Subprefecture. He had a large body, and his legs and hooves were impressively strong. This prompted farm staff to celebrate his birth with red rice, a traditional Japanese way to mark joyful occasions.

According to Takao Takeda, manager of the farm, Haiseiko stood out from birth due to his size and presence. When running in groups, at the front. Takeda believed from an early age that Haiseiko could compete at the highest level in central racing and began telling others about his talent for running. The horse quickly gained recognition as the most promising prospect from Niikappu, seen as the finest horse from Takeda Farm since Kitano O, winner of the 1957 Tenno Sho (Spring).

Despite offers from central racing trainers to debut directly, Haiseiko came under the ownership of Oyu Co., Ltd. This company was headed by Yasushi Aono, the owner of his dam, Haiyu. This led to his management falling under Masami Ito, a trainer at Oi Racecourse who had previously trained Haiyu.

Haiseiko joined the stable in September 1971, where he began basic handling and training. Saburo Takahashi, a jockey involved in his early training, said that even at this young stage, Haiseiko's build and dignified presence made him seem like a grown adult among children. Media outlets were already eager to cover his development, and more offers from central racing trainers began pouring in.

== Racing career ==
In July 1972, at age two, Haiseiko began racing at the Oi Racecourse for the Japanese National Association of Racing. He was undefeated in six starts at Oi Racecourse.

In 1973, at age three, Haiseiko was traded to the Japan Racing Association. He won the Satsuki Sho, the first of the Japanese Classic Races, ⁣⁣but then finished third to Take Hope in the Tokyo Yushun and second to the same horse in the Kikuka Sho.

At age four, Haiseiko won the Takarazuka Kinen. In April, his fame extended far beyond the racing world. Media coverage grew exponentially, even appearing in non-sports outlets, captivating audiences who previously had little interest in horse racing.

Although his undefeated streak ended on May 27 with a loss in the Tokyo Yushun (Japanese Derby), his popularity only increased. Haiseiko became a central figure in Japan's first major horse racing boom. This boom, alongside the second wave in the 1990s, sparked by jockey Yutaka Take and the horse Oguri Cap, is considered one of the two biggest in Japanese racing history. Haiseiko helped transform public perception of horse racing in Japan, shifting it from a gambling activity to a wholesome leisure pursuit. In 1984, he was officially recognized as a "Hall of Fame Horse" for his contribution to racing's popularization.

== Racing form ==
Haiseiko won 13 races and struck podiums six more times out of 22 starts. This data is available from JBIS and netkeiba.

Date	Track	Race	Distance (Condition)	Entry	HN	Odds (Favored)	Finish	Time	Jockey	Winner (Runner-up)
1972 – three-year-old season
Jul 12	Oi	3yo Newcomer	1,000 m (Muddy)	6	3	– (1)	1st	R0:59.4	Yutaka Tsujino	(Gypsy Dancer)
Jul 26	Oi	Under ¥530,000	1,000 m (Fast)	8	5	– (1)	1st	1:00.5	Fumio Fukunaga	(Sette Verona)
Sep 20	Oi	Akikaze Tokubetsu	1,200 m (Fast)	7	4	– (1)	1st	1:12.4	Fumio Fukunaga	(Tosa End)
Oct 9	Oi	Gold Junior	1,400 m (Fast)	5	1	– (1)	1st	R1:24.9	Fumio Fukunaga	(Gold Eagle)
Nov 11	Oi	Shiragiku Tokubetsu	1,400 m (Muddy)	8	5	– (1)	1st	1:25.8	Saburo Takahashi	(Kaya Eikou)
Nov 27	Oi	Seiun Sho	1,600 m (Sloppy)	10	10	– (1)	1st	1:39.2	Saburo Takahashi	(Golden Tateyama)
1973 – four-year-old season
Mar 4	Nakayama	Yayoi Sho	1,800 m (Firm)	10	6	1.5 (1)	1st	1:50.9	Sueo Masuzawa	(New Sant)
Mar 25	Nakayama	Spring Stakes	1,800 m (Firm)	10	3	1.7 (1)	1st	1:51.0	Sueo Masuzawa	(Kuri Onward)
Apr 15	Nakayama	Satsuki Sho	2,000 m (Soft)	16	7	2.7 (1)	1st	2:06.7	Sueo Masuzawa	(Kane Ikoma)
May 6	Tokyo	NHK Hai	2,000 m (Firm)	14	7	1.2 (1)	1st	2:02.3	Sueo Masuzawa	(Kane Ikoma)
May 27	Tokyo	Tokyo Yushun	2,400 m (Firm)	28	5	1.5 (1)	3rd	2:28.7	Sueo Masuzawa	Take Hope
Oct 21	Kyoto	Kyoto Shimbun Hai	2,000 m (Heavy)	13	3	2.1 (1)	2nd	2:08.4	Sueo Masuzawa	Toyo Chikara
Nov 11	Kyoto	Kikuka Sho	3,000 m (Good)	15	4	4.2 (1)	2nd	3:14.2	Sueo Masuzawa	Take Hope
Dec 16	Nakayama	Arima Kinen	2,500 m (Firm)	11	6	3.7 (1)	3rd	2:36.6	Sueo Masuzawa	Strong Eight
1974 – five-year-old season
Jan 20	Tokyo	American Jockey Club Cup	2,400 m (Firm)	10	3	3.1 (1)	9th	1:50.9	Sueo Masuzawa	Take Hope
Mar 10	Nakayama	Nakayama Kinen	1,800 m (Heavy)	9	7	2.8 (1)	1st	1:52.1	Sueo Masuzawa	(Toyo Asahi)
May 5	Kyoto	Tenno Sho (Spring)	3,200 m (Firm)	16	6	2.1 (1)	6th	3:23.6	Sueo Masuzawa	Take Hope
Jun 2	Kyoto	Takarazuka Kinen	2,200 m (Firm)	11	10	3.5 (1)	1st	R2:12.9	Sueo Masuzawa	(Kuri Onward)
Jun 23	Chukyo	Takamatsunomiya Hai	2,000 m (Firm)	10	5	1.6 (1)	1st	2:00.4	Sueo Masuzawa	(IT Etan)
Oct 13	Kyoto	Kyoto Daishoten	2,400 m (Firm)	11	6	4.5 (3)	4th	2:30.3	Sueo Masuzawa	Tanino Chikara
Nov 9	Tokyo	4yo+ Open	1,800 m (Firm)	8	5	2.0 (1)	2nd	1:50.0	Sueo Masuzawa	Yamabuki O
Dec 15	Nakayama	Arima Kinen	2,500 m (Good)	9	1	5.1 (3)	2nd	2:36.7	Sueo Masuzawa	Tanino Chikara

Legend:
Turf Dirt

- R indicated that it was a record time finish
- Bold races indicated that it was a part of the eight major races (八大競走)

== Stud record ==
The data below is based on JBIS Stallion Reports.

=== Notable progeny ===
c = colt, f = filly
bold = grade 1 stakes or equivalent

Year	Progeny	Gender	Major wins
1976	Katsurano Haiseiko	c	**Tokyo Yushun, Tenno Sho (Spring)**, Yomiuri Milers Cup, Meguro Kinen
1977	Tatsuyu Chikara	c	Chunichi Shimbun Hai
1982	Life Tateyama	c	Shinzan Kinen, Winter Stakes, Sapporo Kinen
1983	Maruka Seiko	c	Keihan Hai
1984	Yamanin Arden	c	Kyoto Sansai Stakes, Shinzan Kinen
1986	Sand Peeress	f	**Queen Elizabeth II Cup**
1987	Haku Taisei	c	Kisaragi Sho, **Satsuki Sho**

== Retirement ==
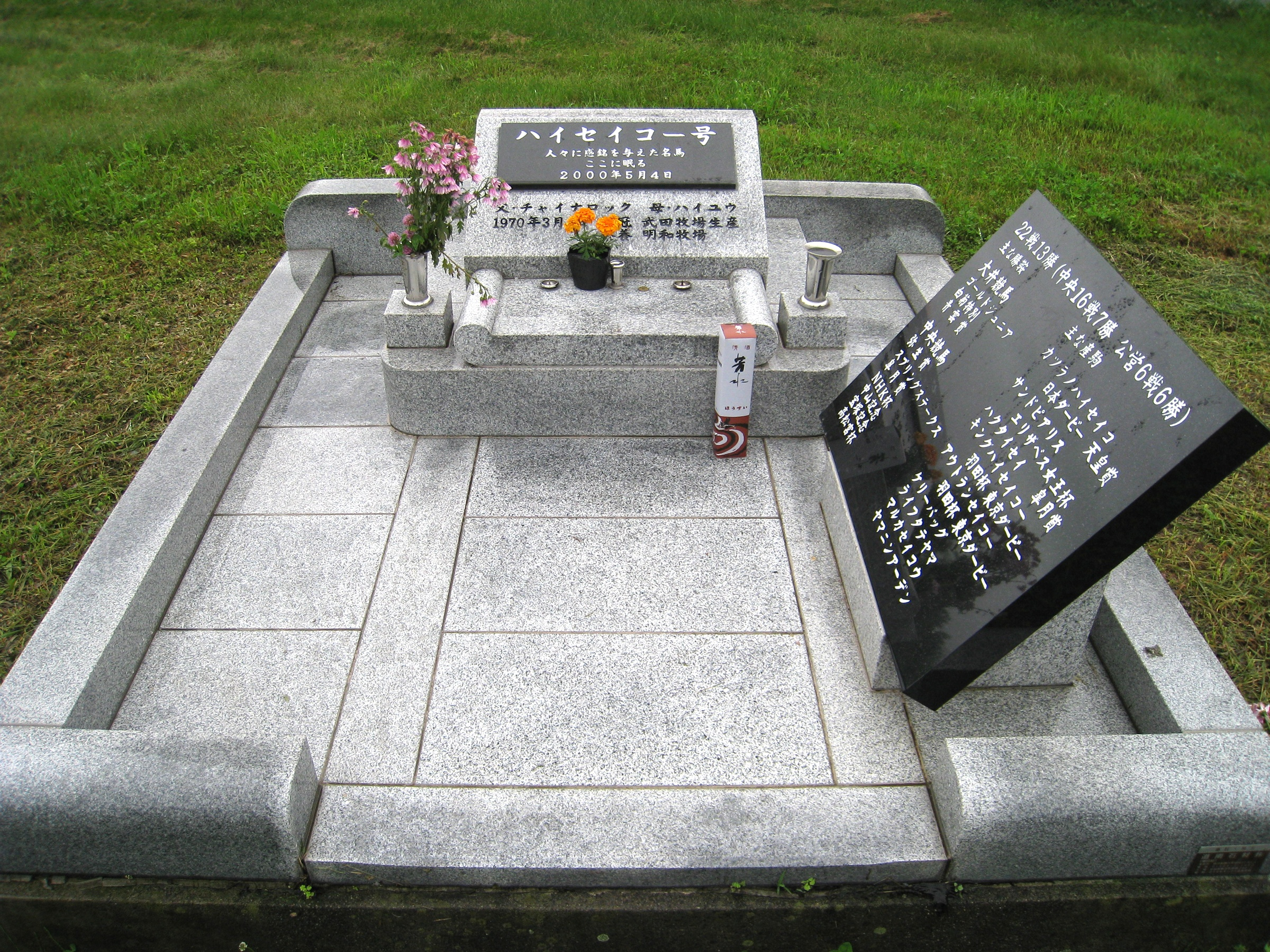
Tomb of Haiseiko, located at Niikappu, Hokkaido.

Even after retiring as a racehorse and becoming a stallion, Haiseiko's popularity never waned. Fans flocked to Meiwa Farm, where he stood at stud, with tour buses regularly arriving. He was consistently bringing racing enthusiasts closer to Japan's horse breeding regions. Among his offspring was Katsurano Haiseiko, who triumphed in the Japanese Derby, the race Haiseiko himself couldn't win. In total, he sired 3 winners of Japan's premier GI races and 19 graded stakes winners. He retired from stud duty in 1997 and spent his final years at Meiwa Farm in Hokkaido, dying from heart failure on May 4, 2000.

== Honors ==
Haiseiko was inducted into the Japan Racing Association Hall of Fame in 1984.

The last NAR race Haiseiko ran and won, the Seiun Sho, was renamed the Haiseiko Kinen in honor of the horse in 2001 after he died. Three statues of Haiseiko have been erected as well, with one each at Oi Racecourse, Nakayama Racecourse, and at Thoroughbred Road Niikappu Roadside Station.

== In popular culture ==
An anthropomorphized version of the horse appears as a character in Uma Musume Pretty Derby, voiced by Sakura Tange.

== Pedigree ==
Pedigree of Haiseiko
Sire China Rock	Rockefella	Hyperion	Gainsborough
Sire China Rock	Rockefella	Hyperion	Selene
Sire China Rock	Rockefella	Rockfel	Falstead
Sire China Rock	Rockefella	Rockfel	Rockliffe
Sire China Rock	May Wong	Rustom Pasha	Son-In-Law
Sire China Rock	May Wong	Rustom Pasha	Cos
Sire China Rock	May Wong	Wezzan	Friar Marcus
Sire China Rock	May Wong	Wezzan	Woodsprite
Dam Haiyu	Karim	Nearco	Pharos
Dam Haiyu	Karim	Nearco	Nogara
Dam Haiyu	Karim	Skylarking	Mirza
Dam Haiyu	Karim	Skylarking	Jennie
Dam Haiyu	Dalmogan	Beau Son	Beau Pere
Dam Haiyu	Dalmogan	Beau Son	Banita
Dam Haiyu	Dalmogan	Reticent	Hua
Dam Haiyu	Dalmogan	Reticent	Timid

== See also ==
- National Association of Racing
- Niikappu, Hokkaido
