= Haku Taisei =

Japanese-bred Thoroughbred racehorse

Haku Taisei ハクタイセイ
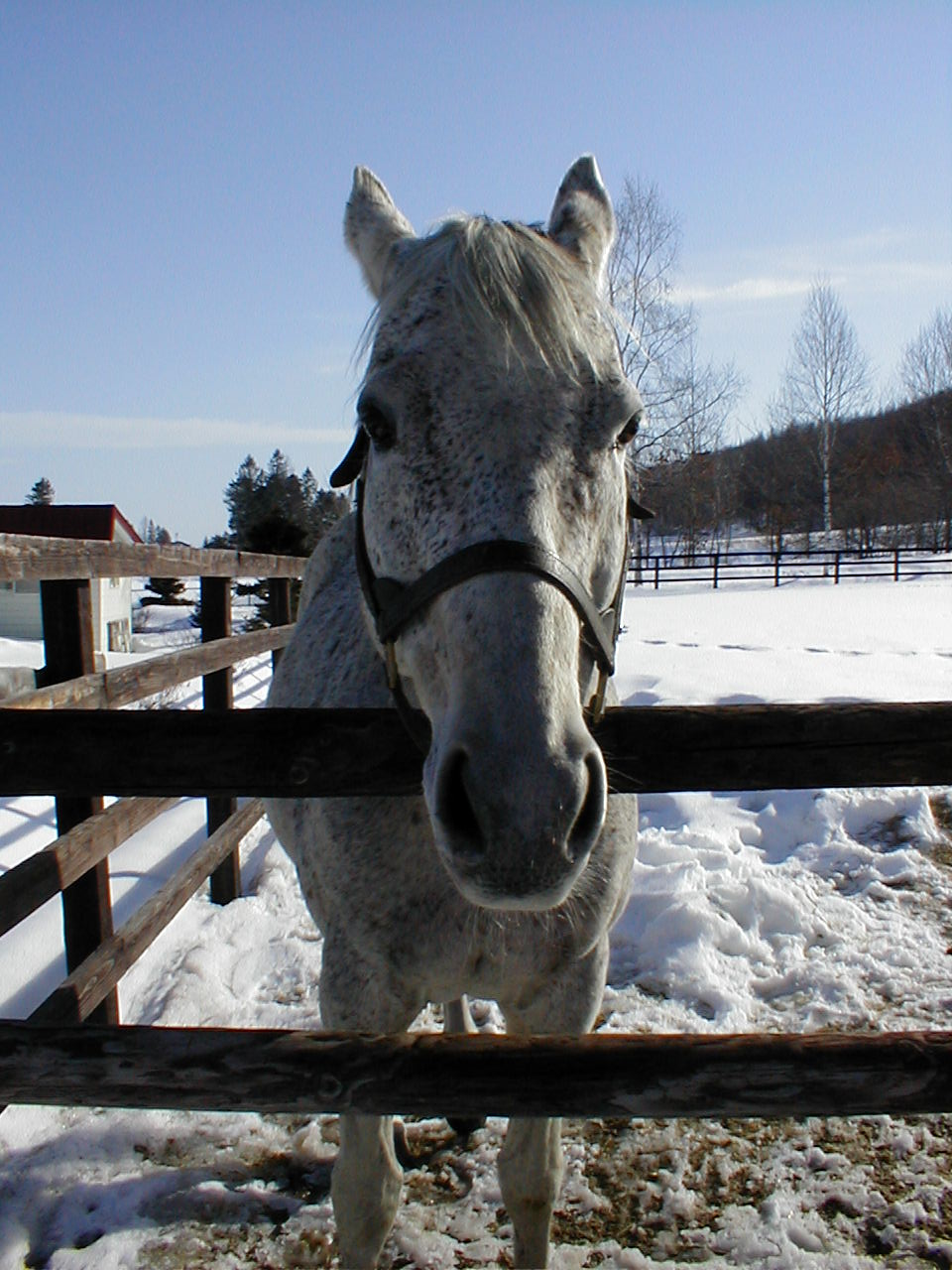
- Haku Taisei in 2002
- Breed: Thoroughbred
- Sire: Haiseiko
- Grandsire: China Rock
- Dam: Dancer Light
- Damsire: Dancer's Image
- Sex: Stallion
- Foaled: April 17, 1987
- Died: October 28, 2013 (aged 26)
- Country: Japan
- Colour: Gray
- Breeder: Tsuchida Farm
- Owner: Shigeo Watanabe
- Racing colours
- Trainer: Tadashi Fuse
- Jockey: Naosuke Sugai; Katsumi Minai
- Record: 11: 6-2-0
- Earnings: ¥180,670,100

Major wins
- Kisaragi Sho (1990); Japanese Classic Race wins: Satsuki Sho (1990)
- Last updated on December 13, 2025

Haku Taisei (Japanese : ハクタイセイ, 17 April 1987 - 28 October 2013) was a Japanese Thoroughbred racehorse and sire. He participated in 11 races in 1989 and 1990, only began to race in graded stakes races as a three-year-old colt, placing first in sixth of them. He was sired by Haiseiko, the horse that caused the first "racing boom" in Japan. He himself won 1990 Satsuki Sho, thus became the first father-son duo to win that said competition.

== Racing career ==
Haku Taisei started his career in July 1989 in Kokura in which he placed second at best in his first four races. The owner decided to attempt him on a dirt track, 1400 m race in Kyoto in his fourth race and he finished second in this race and gained his first win on the next one. He won another race on dirt before switching back to turf at Cyclaman Stakes in Hanshin in which Haku Taisei gained his third win in a row.

In the new season, Haku Taisei kept up a good momentum by winning Wakagoma Stakes in a dominant fashion against the favourite, Dandy Spirit. His team decided to put him in his first graded race, the Kisaragi Sho. This race line up was tough enough as Kogane Taifu, a reigning Hanshin Sansai Stakes winner ran this time. Other future G1 winner horses such as Daitaku Helios and Narita Hayabusa also competing. Despite that, Haku Taisei manage to overcome the poor track condition and got his first graded win.

Haku Taisei was sent straight to the first classic of the season, Satsuki Sho without joining any trial race. For this race, Katsumi Minai became his jockey which put him as one of the favourites alongside Ines Fujin and Mejiro Ryan. He maintained a good position throughout the race and edged out the leading Ines Fujin by a neck, achieving his sixth consecutive victory and becoming the first father-son winner of the Satsuki Sho, following in the footsteps of his father, Haiseiko. In the following race which was Tokyo Yushun, Haku Taisei who was jockeyed by Yutaka Take this time, ran smoothly on the second place the whole race until he slowed down during the final straight and finished fifth instead. Turned out he broke his front leg during the race and forced to rest for the remaining season. This injury also developed into a much worse condition of tendonitis for that particular leg. He showed signs of recovery after a whole year and looked to be fit for Yasuda Kinen but sooner his injury resurfaced and he had to be retired. His registration was cancelled on 30 July 1991.

== Racing form ==
The data available is based on JBIS and Netkeiba.

| Date | Track | Name | Grade | Type/Distance (Condition) | Field | Finished | Time | Jockey | Winner (2nd Place) |
|---|---|---|---|---|---|---|---|---|---|
1989 – two-year-old season
| July 15, 1989 | Kokura | 3YO debut | | Turf 1000m (Firm) | 10 | 2nd | 0:59.1 | Naosuke Sugai | Hagino High Touch |
| September 10, 1989 | Hanshin | 3YO maiden | | Turf 1600m (Firm) | 13 | 4th | 1:37.8 | Naosuke Sugai | Queen's Kiss |
| September 24, 1989 | Hanshin | 3YO maiden | | Turf 1200m (Firm) | 11 | 6th | 1:11.7 | Naosuke Sugai | Eishin Sunny |
| October 14, 1989 | Kyoto | 3YO maiden | | Dirt 1200m (Fast) | 16 | 2nd | 1:13.7 | Naosuke Sugai | Yamano Kaguyahime |
| October 28, 1989 | Kyoto | 3YO maiden | | Dirt 1400m (Fast) | 11 | 1st | 1:25.6 | Naosuke Sugai | (Eishin Carol) |
| December 3, 1989 | Hanshin | 3YO maiden | | Dirt 1200m (Fast) | 12 | 1st | 1:12.7 | Katsumi Minai | (Yamano Kaguyahime) |
| December 24, 1989 | Hanshin | Cyclamen Stakes | OP | Turf 2000m (Good) | 7 | 1st | 2:03.9 | Naosuke Sugai | (Inter Voyager) |
1990 – three-year-old season
| January 20, 1990 | Kyoto | Wakagoma Stakes | OP | Turf 2000m (Firm) | 10 | 1st | 2:04.0 | Naosuke Sugai | (Dandy Spirit) |
| February 11, 1990 | Hanshin | Kisaragi Sho | 3 | Turf 2000m (Heavy) | 12 | 1st | 2:04.1 | Naosuke Sugai | (Kogane Taifu) |
| April 15, 1990 | Nakayama | Satsuki Sho | 1 | Turf 2000m (Firm) | 18 | 1st | 2:02.2 | Katsumi Minai | (Ines Fujin) |
| May 27, 1990 | Tokyo | Tokyo Yushun | 1 | Turf 2400m (Firm) | 22 | 5th | 2:25.9 | Yutaka Take | Ines Fujin |
1991 – four-year-old season
| May 12, 1991 | Tokyo | Yasuda Kinen | 1 | Turf 1600m (Firm) | 16 | DNS | – | Shoichi Osaki | Daiichi Ruby |

== Breeding career and death ==
Haku Taisei was put to stud duty in Shizunai Stallion Station in 1992 and moved to Iburi Light stud farm in 1998 and subsequently to Tokachi Light Horse Agricultural Cooperative Stud Farm in 2000 until his retirement in 2010. He was then moved back to Shizunai Stallion Station as fully retired horse.

He died on 28 October 2013, after suffering an intestinal blockage caused by melanoma.

== Pedigree ==
Pedigree of Haku Taisei (JPN), 1987
| Sire Haiseiko | China Rock | Rockefella | Hyperion |
| Sire Haiseiko | China Rock | Rockefella | Rockfel |
| Sire Haiseiko | China Rock | May Wong | Rustom Pasha |
| Sire Haiseiko | China Rock | May Wong | Wezzan |
| Sire Haiseiko | Haiyu | Karim | Nearco |
| Sire Haiseiko | Haiyu | Karim | Skylarking |
| Sire Haiseiko | Haiyu | Dalmogan | Beau Son |
| Sire Haiseiko | Haiyu | Dalmogan | Reticent |
| Dam Dancer Light | Dancer's Image | Native Dancer | Polynesian |
| Dam Dancer Light | Dancer's Image | Native Dancer | Geisha |
| Dam Dancer Light | Dancer's Image | Noors Image | Noor |
| Dam Dancer Light | Dancer's Image | Noors Image | Little Sphinx |
| Dam Dancer Light | Never Light | Never Beat | Never Say Die |
| Dam Dancer Light | Never Light | Never Beat | Bride Elect |
| Dam Dancer Light | Never Light | Miss Fall | Kumohata |
| Dam Dancer Light | Never Light | Miss Fall | Star Light (Family: 4-d) |

- Haku Taisei was inbred 5 x 5 to Nasrullah (Noor's and Never Say Die's Sire)
