= Nakayama Kinen =

Nakayama Kinen 中山記念
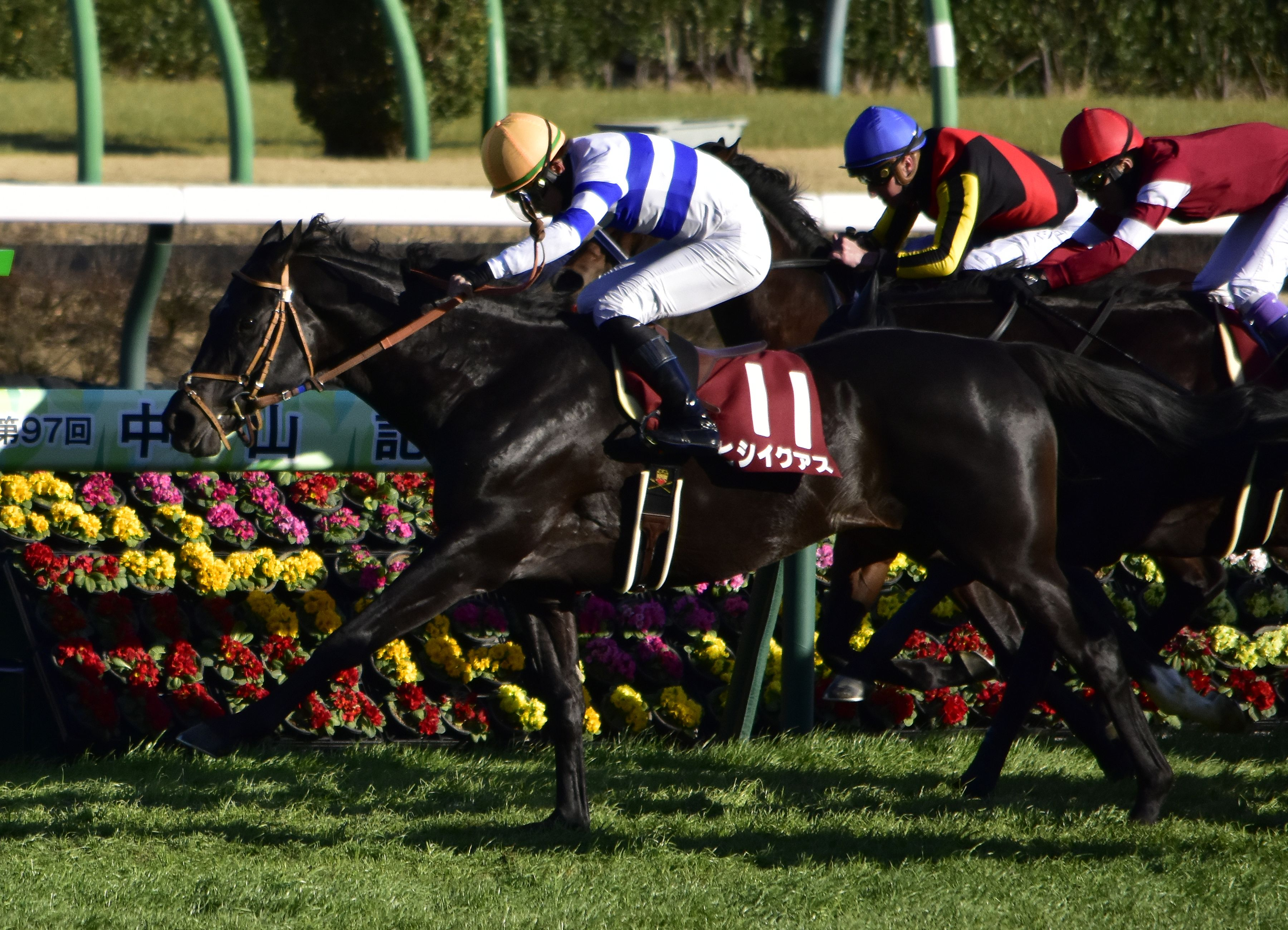
- Hishi Iguazu winning the 2023 Nakayama Kinen
- Class: Grade 2
- Location: Nakayama Racecourse, Funabashi, Chiba.
- Inaugurated: 1936
- Race type: Thoroughbred Flat racing

Race information
- Distance: 1800 metres
- Surface: Turf
- Track: Right-handed
- Qualification: 4-y-o+
- Weight: 4-y-o 55kg, 5-y-o+ 56kg. Fillies & mares allowed 2kg.
- Purse: ¥ 145,220,000 (as of 2026): 1st: ¥ 67,000,000; 2nd: ¥ 27,000,000; 3rd: ¥ 17,000,000

The Nakayama Kinen (中山記念, Nakayama Kinen) is a Grade 2 flat horse race in Japan for Thoroughbreds aged four and older run over a distance of 1,800 metres at the Nakayama Racecourse, Funabashi, Chiba. The race is run in late February or early March.

The race was first run in 1936. It was originally run twice a year, in spring and autumn, before a single annual race was established in 1952. Among the winners of the race have been Silence Suzuka, Victoire Pisa, Just A Way, and Panthalassa.

== Weight ==
57 kg for four-year-olds above.

Allowances:

- 2 kg for fillies / mares
- 1 kg for southern hemisphere bred three-year-olds

Penalties (excluding two-year-old race performance):

- If a graded stakes race has been won within a year:
  - 2 kg for a grade 1 win (1 kg for fillies / mares)
  - 1 kg for a grade 2 win
- If a graded stakes race has been won for more than a year:
  - 1 kg for a grade 1 win

== Records ==
Most successful horse (2 wins):

- Kane Mikasa – 1978, 1979
- Eighty Tosho – 1982, 1983
- Lohengrin – 2003, 2007
- Balance of Game – 2005, 2006
- Company – 2008, 2009
- Win Bright – 2018, 2019
- Hishi Iguazu - 2021, 2023

== Winners since 1990 ==
Year	Winner	Age	Jockey	Trainer	Owner	Time
1990	Hokuto Helios	6	Yoshitomi Shibata	Takao Nakano	Kanamorimori Shoji	1:48.3
1991	Yukino Sunrise	4	Sueo Masuzawa	Yasuhiro Suzuki	Motoyuki Inoue	1:47.7
1992	Dynamite Daddy	4	Kazuhiro Kato	Yasuhiro Suzuki	Seiichi Iketani	1:47.0
1993	Movie Star	7	Shigehiko Kishi	Noriaki Tsubo	Teruya Yoshida	1:47.0
1994	Sakura Chitose O	4	Futoshi Kojima	Katsutaro Sakai	Sakura Commerce	1:48.9
1995	Fujiyama Kenzan	7	Masayoshi Ebina	Hideyuki Mori	Tatsuya Fujimoto	1:50.3
1996	Sakura Laurel	5	Norihiro Yokoyama	Kazunori Sakai	Sakura Commerce	1:47.1
1997	King of Daiya	5	Yoshitomi Shibata	Toshiaki Shimizu	Toshiyasu Ishige	1:48.7
1998	Silence Suzuka	4	Yutaka Take	Mitsuru Hashida	Keiji Nagai	1:48.6
1999	King Halo	4	Yoshitomi Shibata	Masahiro Sakaguchi	Yoshio Asakawa	1:47.5
2000	Daiwa Texas	7	Hiroki Goto	Sueo Masuzawa	Daiwa Co., Ltd	1:46.8
2001	American Boss	6	Teruo Eda	Fuyuki Tago	Abiru Fudosan	1:46.9
2002	Tokai Point	6	Yukio Okabe	Yoshiyuki Goto	Masanori Uchimura	1:45.4
2003	Lohengrin	4	Hiroki Goto	Masanori Ito	Shadai Race Horse	1:47.6
2004	Sakura President	4	Yutaka Take	Futoshi Kojima	Sakura Commerce	1:44.9
2005	Balance of Game	6	Katsuhara Tanaka	Yoshitada Munakata	Hiroyuki Sonobe	1:46.5
2006	Balance of Game	7	Katsuharu Tanaka	Yoshitada Munakata	Hiroyuki Sonobe	1:48.9
2007	Lohengrin	8	Hiroki Goto	Masanori Ito	Shadai Race Horse	1:47.2
2008	Company	7	Norihiro Yokoyama	Hidetaka Otonashi	Hideko Kondo	1:47.3
2009	Company	8	Norihiro Yokoyama	Hidetaka Otonashi	Hideko Kondo	1:49.2
2010	Tosen Crown	6	Teruo Eda	Yasuo Sugawara	Takaya Shimakawa	1:51.7
2011	Victoire Pisa	4	Mirco Demuro	Katsuhiko Sumii	Yoshimi Ichikawa	1:46.0
2012	Federalist	5	Masayoshi Ebina	Tsuyoshi Tanaka	Shadai Race Horse	1:47.3
2013	Nakayama Knight	5	Yoshitomi Shibata	Yoshitaka Ninomiya	Shinichi Izumi	1:47.3
2014	Just A Way	5	Norihiro Yokoyama	Naosuke Sugai	Akatsuki Yamatoya	1:49.8
2015	Nuovo Record	4	Yasunari Iwata	Makoto Saito	Reiko Hara	1:50.3
2016	Duramente	4	Mirco Demuro	Noriyuki Hori	Sunday Racing Co. Ltd.	1:45.9
2017	Neorealism	6	Mirco Demuro	Noriyuki Hori	Carrot Farm Co. Ltd.	1:47.6
2018	Win Bright	4	Masami Matsuoka	Yoshihiro Hatakeyama	Win Co. Ltd.	1:47.6
2019	Win Bright	5	Masami Matsuoka	Yoshihiro Hatakeyama	Win Co. Ltd.	1:45.5
2020	Danon Kingly	4	Norihiro Yokoyama	Kiyoshi Hagiwara	Danox	1:46.3
2021	Hishi Iguazu	5	Kohei Matsuyama	Noriyuki Hori	Masahide Abe	1:44.9
2022	Panthalassa	5	Yutaka Yoshida	Yoshito Yahagi	Hiroo Race Co. Ltd.	1:46.4
2023	Hishi Iguazu	7	Kohei Matsuyama	Noriyuki Hori	Masahide Abe	1:47.1
2024	Matenro Sky	5	Norihiro Yokoyama	Mikio Matsunaga	Chiyono Terada	1:48.1
2025	Sixpence	4	Christophe Lemaire	Sakae Kunieda	Carrot Farm	1:44.8
2026	Lebensstil	6	Keita Tosaki	Hiroyasu Tanaka	Carrot Farm	1:45.1

== Earlier winners ==
- 1936 - Atlanta
- 1937 - Tokumasa
- 1938 - Moazan
- 1939 - Tate
- 1940 - Espalion
- 1941 - Yamatomo
- 1942 - Nipatua
- 1943 - Shimahaya
- 1944 - no race
- 1945 - no race
- 1946 - no race
- 1947 - Yamato Nadeshinko
- 1948 - Etsuzan
- 1949 - Hide Hikari
- 1950 - Yashima Daughter
- 1951 - Misawa Hope
- 1952 - Kiyo Strong
- 1953 - Brulette
- 1954 - Cheerio
- 1955 - Takagiku
- 1956 - Hide Homare
- 1957 - My Way
- 1958 - Mitsuru
- 1959 - Fillie
- 1960 - Harrow More
- 1961 - Onward Stan
- 1962 - Gin Toshi
- 1963 - Nasuno Midori
- 1964 - Toast
- 1965 - Sweet Lapel
- 1966 - Fuji Isami
- 1967 - Onward Hill
- 1968 - Shesky
- 1969 - Meiji Shiro
- 1970 - Akatsuki Teru
- 1971 - Hida President
- 1972 - Tosho Pit
- 1973 - Jinden
- 1974 - Haiseiko
- 1975 - Hikaru Jinden
- 1976 - Yamabuki O
- 1977 - Eyeful
- 1978 - Kane Mikasa
- 1979 - Kane Mikasa
- 1980 - Yoshinosky
- 1981 - Kitano Riki O
- 1982 - Eighty Tosho
- 1983 - Eighty Tosho
- 1984 - Tudenham King
- 1985 - Tosho Pegasus
- 1986 - Kushiro King
- 1987 - Suzu Parade
- 1988 - Mogami Yashima
- 1989 - Kosei

== See also ==
- Horse racing in Japan
- List of Japanese flat horse races
