= Naosuke Sugai =

Japanese horse trainer

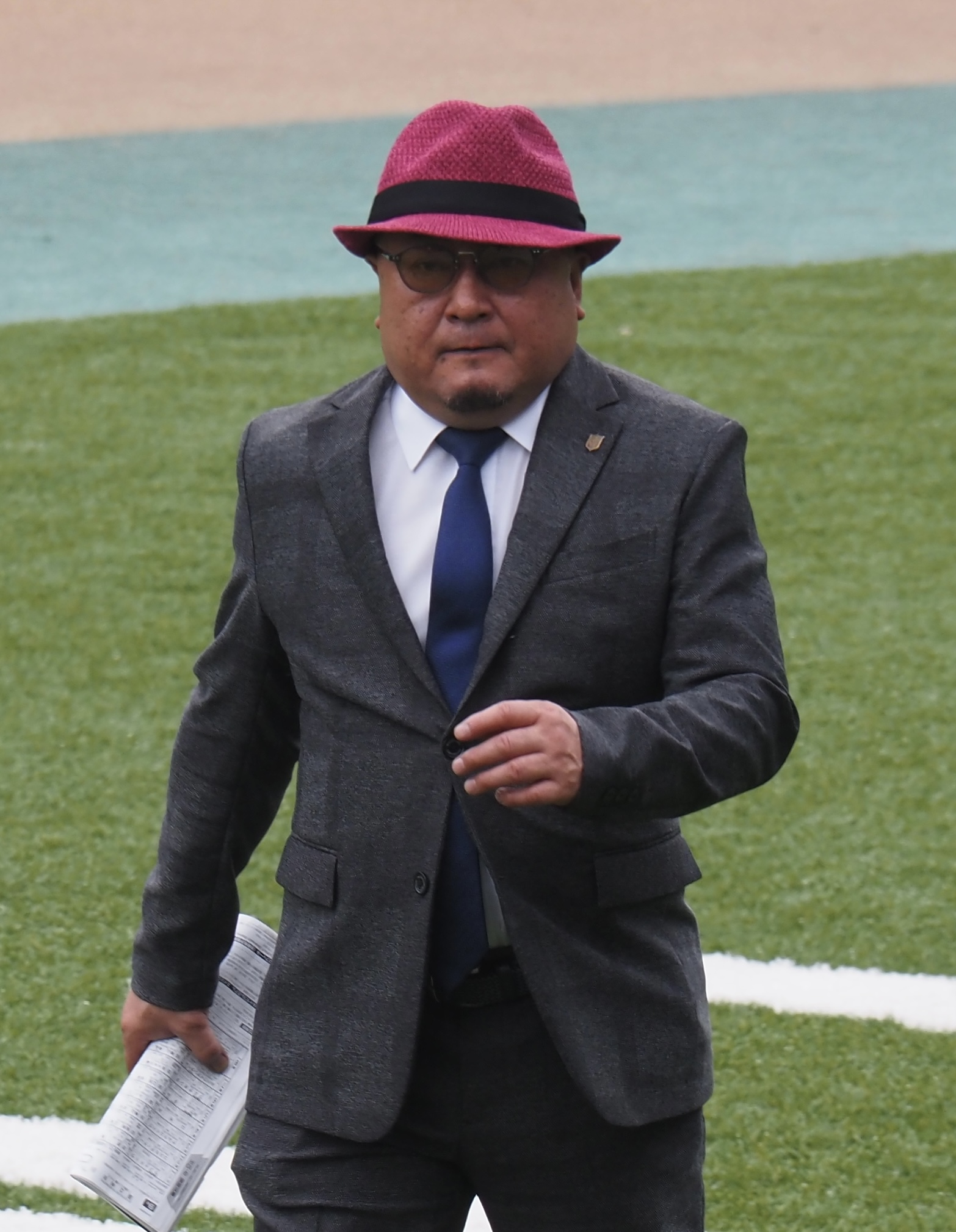
- Sugai in 2024

Personal information
- Native name: 須貝尚介
- Nationality: Japanese
- Born: June 3, 1966 (age 59) Shiga Prefecture
- Occupation(s): Horse trainer, Jockey (retired)

Horse racing career
- Sport: Horse racing

Significant horses
- Gold Ship, Just A Way, Sodashi

Naosuke Sugai (須貝尚介; born June 3, 1966) is a Japanese horse trainer and retired jockey of the Japan Racing Association.

== Career ==
Sugai started his jockey career in March 1985 after graduating the Horse Racing School's jockey curriculum. He was one of the first members to graduate the school alongside Yoshitomi Shibata. He ran his first race on March 2 at a maiden race held at Hanshin Racecourse with Shin Kokin, in which he and the horse finished 6th. He won his first race the following day at Hanshin when he rode Hagino Goody in her debut race.

Sugai won his first graded race in 1990 when he rode Haku Taisei and won the Kisaragi Sho.

Sugai retired in 2008 and became a horse trainer based at Ritto Training Center. His first race as a trainer was . He won his first race as a trainer on March 14 at an allowance race held at Hanshin with Hokko One Man.

Sugai won his first graded race as a trainer with Gold Ship when he won the Kyodo Tsushin Hai in 2012, and won his first GI race with the same horse when the horse won the Satsuki Shō that same year. Later that year, he became the fastest trainer in Japan to win his 100th victory when Gold Ship won the Kikuka-shō; having done so in 3 years, 7 months, and 21 days.

Sugai won his 500th win as a trainer on April 2, 2023 when T O Solennel won the Akashi Stakes.

In addition to Gold Ship, Sugai has also trained several horses of note. Among those are Just A Way, who was named the best horse of the year in the 2014 World's Best Racehorse Rankings following his record breaking performance at the Dubai Duty Free, as well as Sodashi, who was the first pure white horse to win a JRA GI race.

== Personal life ==
Sugai's father, Hikozo was also a former horse trainer before retiring in 2011.

== Major wins ==
- Arima Kinen - (1) - Gold Ship (2012)
- Asahi Hai Futurity Stakes - (1) - Dolce More (2022)
- Dubai Duty Free - (1) - Just A Way (2014)
- Hanshin Juvenile Fillies - (3) - Robe Tissage (2012), Red Reveur (2013), Sodashi (2020)
- Oka Sho - (1) - Sodashi (2021)
- Kikuka-shō - (1) - Gold Ship (2012)
- Satsuki Shō - (1) - Gold Ship (2012)
- Kashiwa Kinen - (1) - Shonan Nadeshiko (2022)
- Takarazuka Kinen - (2) - Gold Ship (2013, 2014)
- Tenno Sho (Autumn) - (1) - Just A Way (2013)
- Tenno Sho (Spring) - (1) - Gold Ship (2015)
- Victoria Mile - (2) - Admire Lead (2017), Sodashi (2022)
- Yasuda Kinen - (1) - Just A Way (2014)
