= Kyodo Tsushin Hai =

Kyodo Tsushin Hai (Tokinominoru Kinen) 共同通信杯
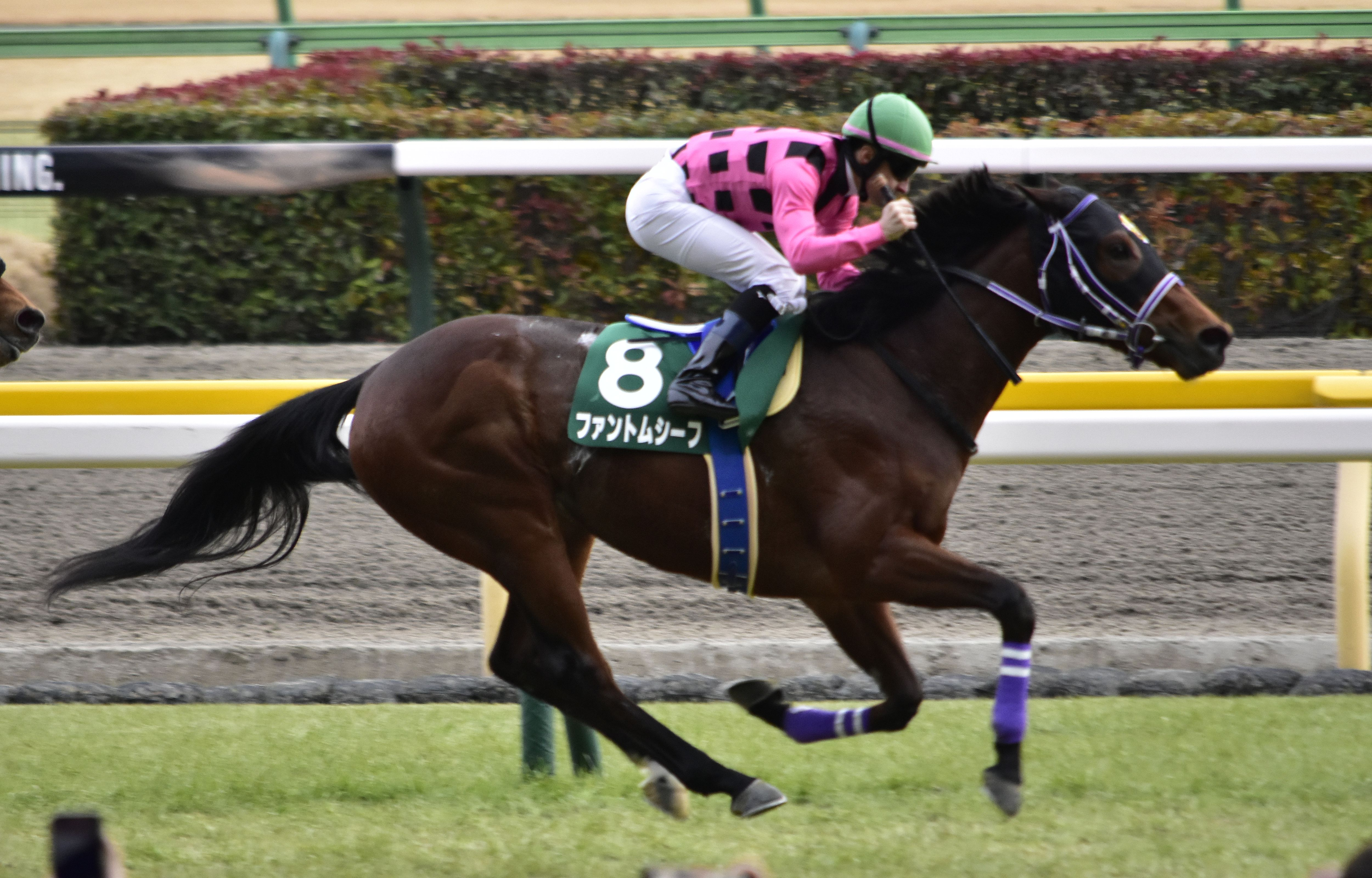
- Phantom Thief winning the Kyodo Tsushin Hai in 2023
- Class: Grade 3
- Location: Tokyo Racecourse
- Inaugurated: 1967
- Race type: Thoroughbred Flat racing

Race information
- Distance: 1800 metres
- Surface: Turf
- Track: Left-handed
- Qualification: 3-y-o
- Weight: Colts 57 kg, fillies 56 kg
- Purse: ¥ 87,960,000 (as of 2026): 1st: ¥ 41,000,000; 2nd: ¥ 16,000,000; 3rd: ¥ 10,000,000

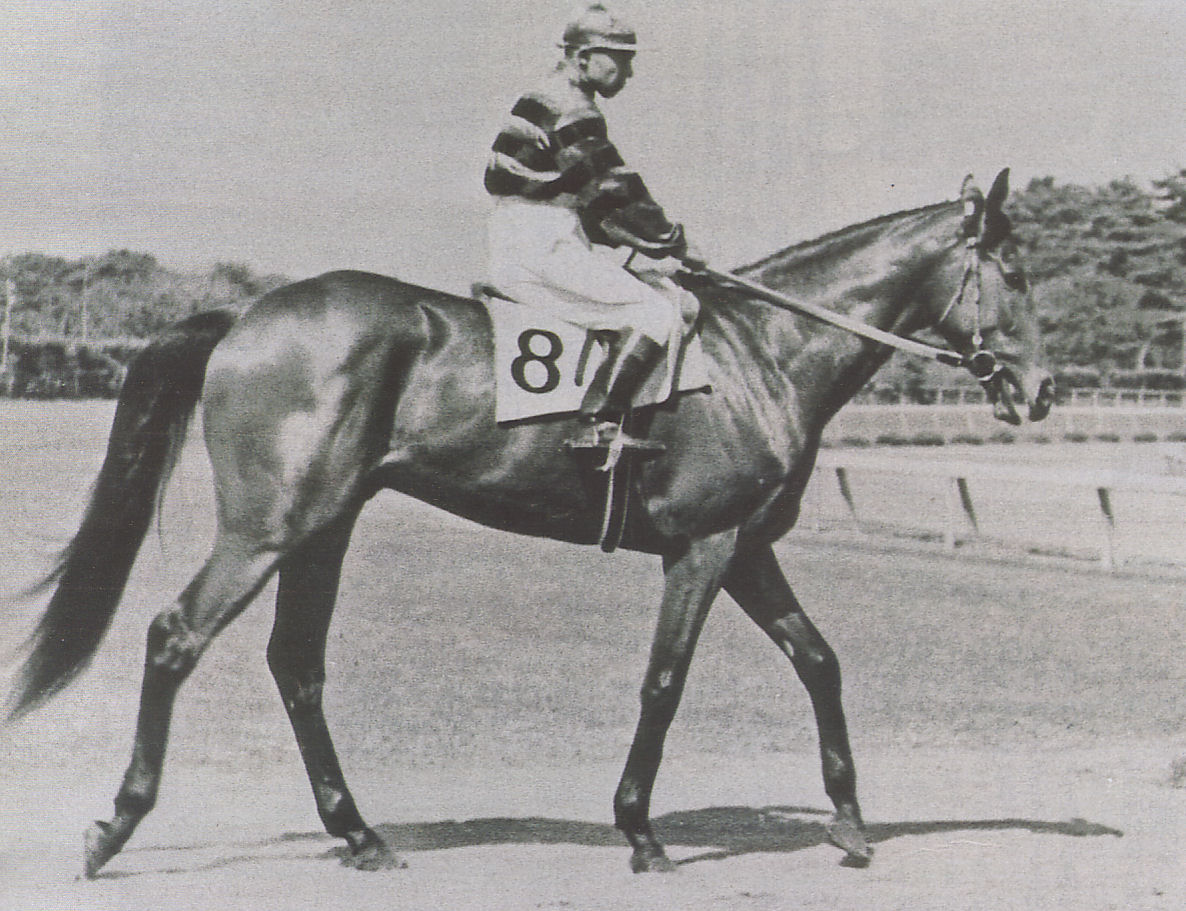
Tokino Minoru, after whom the race is named

The Kyodo Tsushin Hai (Tokinominoru Kinen) (Japanese 共同通信杯, kyōdō tsūshin hai) is a Grade 3 horse race for three-year-old Thoroughbreds run in February over a distance of 1800 metres at Tokyo Racecourse. Officially known as the Kyodo Tsushin Hai, the subtitle of the race is named in honour of the undefeated 1951 Satsuki Sho and Tōkyō Yūshun winner Tokino Minoru since 1969.

Kyodo News (共同通信社, Kyōdō Tsūshinsha), which provides the award, is a news agency headquartered in Minato-ku, Tokyo.

The race was first run in 1967, initially titled as Tokyo Yonsai Stakes (東京4歳ステークス) and was renamed to Kyodo Tsushin Hai Yonsai Stakes (共同通信杯4歳ステークス) in 1983, then designated to Grade 3 status in 1984. In 2000, it was renamed to its current title. It has historically been contested at a variety of venues but has been run over its current course and distance since 1980. Winners of the race have included Mr. C. B., Narita Brian, El Condor Pasa, Jungle Pocket, Admire Moon, Gold Ship and Masquerade Ball.

While this race is not officially a trial race for the Satsuki Sho, many horses who won or placed within the top four of this race have gone on to win in classic races, with winners such as Gold Ship, Isla Bonita, Dee Majesty, Efforia and Justin Milano, as well as Deep Brillante, Duramente, Shahryar, Geoglyph and Tastiera all coming in within fourth place before going on to win either the Satsuki Sho and/or the Tokyo Yushun. Consequently, this has led to the race being seen as an important race for contenders of classic races.

== Winners since 2000 ==
Year	Winner	Jockey	Trainer	Owner	Time
2000	Eagle Cafe	Yukio Okabe	Futoshi Kojima	Kiyoshi Nishikawa	1:49.7
2001	Jungle Pocket	Koichi Tsunoda	Sadao Watanabe	Yomoji Saito	1:47.9
2002	Cheers Stark	Shinji Fujita	Kenji Yamauchi	Kiyoko Kitamura	1:50.4
2003 ^{[a]}	Run to the Freeze	Hiroyuki Uchida	Kenji Yamauchi	Toshio Fukami	1:48.3
2004	Meiner Dupre	Hiroshi Kitamura	Yoshihiro Hatakeyama	Thoroughbred Club Ruffian	1:47.4
2005	Stormy Cafe	Hirofumi Shii	Futoshi Kojima	Kyoko Nishikawa	1:47.8
2006	Admire Moon	Yutaka Take	Hiroyoshi Matsuda	Riichi Kondo	1:48.4
2007	Fusaichi Ho O	Katsumi Ando	Kunihide Matsuda	Fusao Sekiguchi	1:47.7
2008	Shonan Alba	Masayoshi Ebina	Yoshitaka Ninomiya	Tetsuhide Kunimoto	1:47.6
2009	Break Run Out	Yutaka Take	Hirofumi Toda	Carrot Farm	1:47.3
2010	Hansode Bando	Masayoshi Ebina	Mitsuhiro Ogata	Takashi Watanabe	1:48.2
2011	Nakayama Knight	Yoshitomi Shibata	Yoshitaka Ninomiya	Shinichi Izumi	1:48.5
2012	Gold Ship	Hiroyuki Uchida	Naosuke Sugai	Eiichi Kobayashi	1:48.3
2013	Meikei Pega Star	Norihiro Yokoyama	Kazuyoshi Kihara	Nagoya Keiba	1:46.0
2014	Isla Bonita	Masayoshi Ebina	Hironori Kurita	Shadai Race Horse	1:48.1
2015	Real Steel	Yuichi Fukunaga	Yoshito Yahagi	Sunday Racing	1:47.1
2016	Dee Majesty	Masayoshi Ebina	Yoshitaka Ninomiya	Masashi Shimada	1:47.4
2017	Suave Richard	Hirofumi Shii	Yasushi Shono	NICKS	1:47.5
2018	Oken Moon	Hiroshi Kitamura	Sakae Kunieda	Akira Fukui	1:47.4
2019	Danon Kingly	Keita Tosaki	Kiyoshi Hagiwara	Danox	1:46.8
2020	Darlington Hall	Christophe Lemaire	Tetsuya Kimura	Godolphin	1:49.6
2021	Efforia	Takeshi Yokoyama	Yuichi Shikato	Carrot Farm	1:47.6
2022	Danon Beluga	Kohei Matsuyama	Noriyuki Hori	Danox	1:47.9
2023	Phantom Thief	Christophe Lemaire	Masayuki Nishimura	Turf Sport	1:47.0
2024	Justin Milano	Keita Tosaki	Yasuo Tomomichi	Masahiro Miki	1:48.0
2025	Masquerade Ball	Ryusei Sakai	Takahisa Tezuka	Shadai Race Horse	1:46.0
2026	Realize Sirius	Akihide Tsumura	Takahisa Tezuka	Yosuke Imafuku	1:45.5

^{a} The 2003 running took place at Nakayama Racecourse.

== Earlier winners ==
- 1967 - Hogetsu O
- 1968 - Takeshiba O
- 1969 - Minoru
- 1970 - Tama Arashi
- 1971 - Yashima Raiden
- 1972 - Suzu Boxer
- 1973 - Speed Rich
- 1974 - Colonel Symboli
- 1975 - Kaburaya O
- 1976 - Ten Point
- 1977 - Hishi Speed
- 1978 - Sakura Shouri
- 1979 - Rikiai O
- 1980 - Lindo Taiyo
- 1981 - Todoroki Hiho
- 1982 - Saruno King
- 1983 - Mr. C. B.
- 1984 - Bizen Nishiki
- 1985 - Sakura Yutaka O
- 1986 - Dyna Gulliver
- 1987 - Meiner David
- 1988 - Muguet Royal
- 1989 - Meiner Brave
- 1990 - Ines Fujin
- 1991 - Iide Saison
- 1992 - Air Jordan
- 1993 - Meiner Remark
- 1994 - Narita Brian
- 1995 - Narita King O
- 1996 - Sakura Speed O
- 1997 - Mejiro Bright
- 1998 - El Condor Pasa
- 1999 - Yamanin Acro

== See also ==
- Horse racing in Japan
- List of Japanese flat horse races
