= Satsuki Shō =

Satsuki Shō Japanese 2,000 Guineas 皐月賞
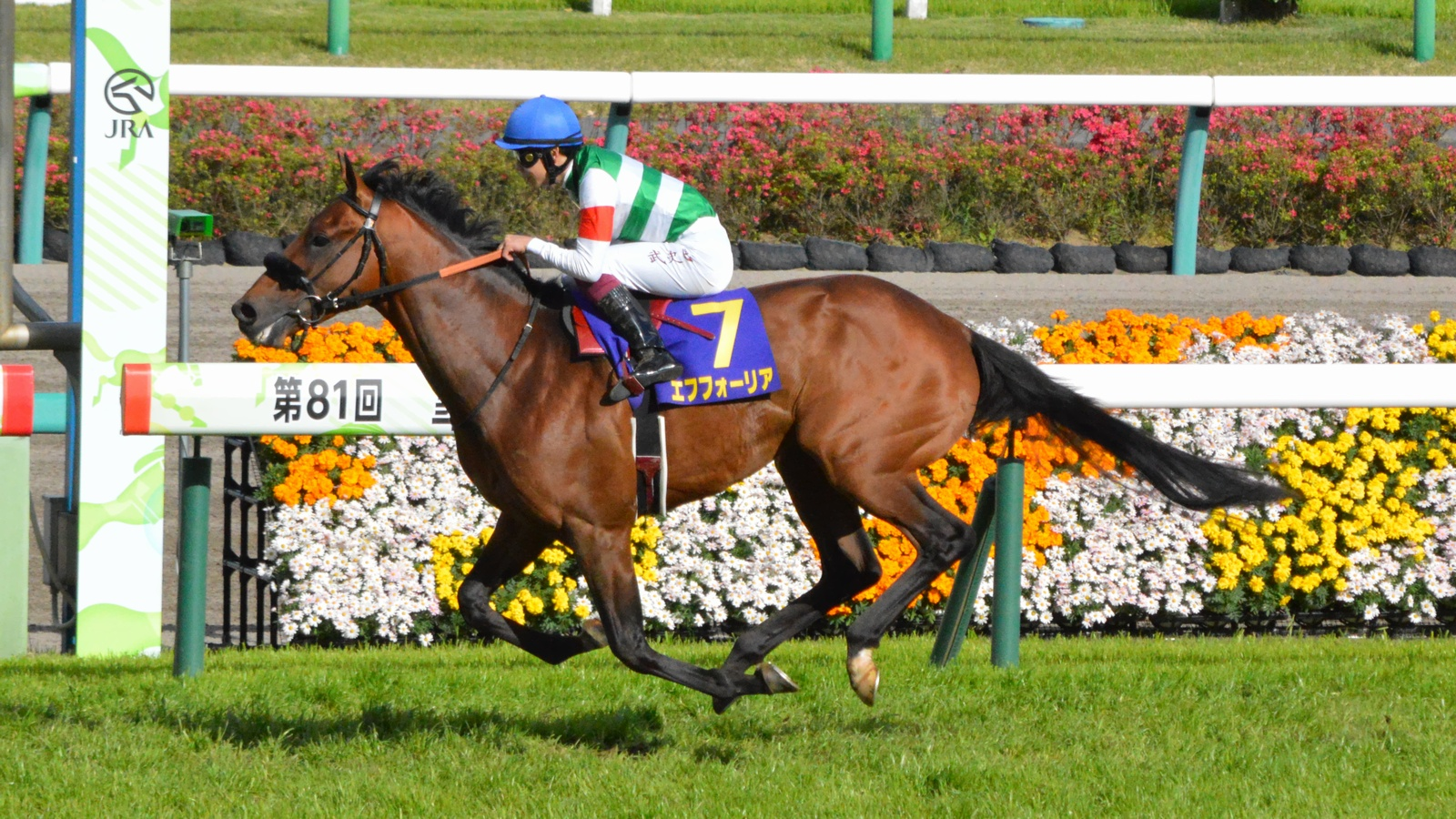
- 2021 Satsuki Shō winner, Efforia
- Class: Grade 1
- Location: Nakayama Racecourse; Funabashi, Chiba
- Inaugurated: 29 April 1939 (87 years ago)
- Race type: Thoroughbred flat racing

Race information
- Distance: 2000 meters (About 10 furlongs or 1 1/4 miles)
- Record: 1:56.5; Lovcen (2026)
- Surface: Turf
- Track: Right-handed
- Qualification: Three-years-old Colts & Fillies
- Weight: 57 kg Allowances; 2 kg for fillies
- Purse: ¥ 432,000,000 (as of 2026): 1st: ¥ 200,000,000; 2nd: ¥ 80,000,000; 3rd: ¥ 50,000,000
- Bonuses: Classic Triple Crown; Winner of Satsuki Shō, Tōkyō Yūshun and Kikuka Shō ¥ 300,000,000

The Satsuki Shō (皐月賞) is a Japanese Grade 1 flat race for three-year-old thoroughbred colts and fillies run over a distance of 2,000 metres (approximately 1 mile 2 furlongs) at the Nakayama Racecourse, Funabashi, Chiba, and scheduled to take place each year at mid April.

== History ==
The Satsuki Shō was first contested in 1939 as Yokohama Nōrinshō Shōten Yonsai Yobiuma (横浜農林省賞典四歳呼馬) over a distance of 1,850 metres at Negishi Racecourse in Yokohama, Kanagawa, and is regarded as the Japanese equivalent of the 2,000 Guineas. (Note that the original 2,000 Guineas is run at 1,609 metres, or one mile, about two furlongs shorter than the Satsuki Shō.)

The race was run at Negishi Racecourse until 1942, but the course was closed due to the World War II in 1943 and it was staged at Tokyo Racecourse over a distance of 1,800 metres until 1944. After a two-year hiatus, the race was resumed at Tokyo Racecourse twice in 1947 and 1948, then it was renamed to the Satsuki Shō and settled at Nakayama Racecourse since 1949. The distance was first set to 1,950 metres, then extended to 2,000 metres in 1950.

It is one of Japan's five Classic races, and it also serves as the opening leg of the Japanese Triple Crown followed by the Tōkyō Yūshun (Japanese Derby) and the Kikuka Shō (Japanese St. Leger).

== Trial races ==
Trial races provide automatic berths to the winning horses or placed horses as specified.

Race Name	Class	Racecourse	Distance	Condition
Yayoi Sho (Deep Impact Kinen)	GII	Nakayama	2,000 meters	Top 3 horses
Spring Stakes	GII	Nakayama	1,800 meters	Top 3 horses
Wakaba Stakes	L	Hanshin	2,000 meters	Top 2 horses

Races listed below does not provide automatic berths, but still important steps for this race.

Race Name	Class	Racecourse	Distance
Keisei Hai	GIII	Nakayama	2,000 meters
Wakagoma Stakes	L	Kyoto	2,000 meters
Kisaragi Sho	GIII	Kyoto	1,800 meters
Kyodo Tsushin Hai	GIII	Tokyo	1,800 meters
Sumire Stakes	L	Hanshin	2,200 meters
Mainichi Hai	GIII	Hanshin	1,800 meters

== Records ==
- Fastest winning time : 1:56.5 – Lovcen (2026)
- Slowest winning time : 2:11 2/5 – Dainana Hoshu (1954)

Leading jockey(s) :

- 4 – Mirco Demuro : Neo Universe (2003), Daiwa Major (2004), Logotype (2013), Duramente (2015)

Leading trainer(s) :

- 4 – Waichiro Tanaka : St. Lite (1941), Arbeit (1942), Tokino Minoru (1951), Kegon (1955)

Leading owner(s) :

- 6 – Shadai Race Horse : Dyna Cosmos (1986), Genuine (1995), Neo Universe (2003), Captain Thule (2008), Isla Bonita (2014), Sol Oriens (2023)
- 6 – Sunday Racing : Unrivaled (2009), Orfevre (2011), Duramente (2015), Al Ain (2017), Geoglyph (2022), Museum Mile (2025)

== Winners since 1984 ==
Year	Winner	Jockey	Trainer	Owner	Time
1984	Symboli Rudolf	Yukio Okabe	Yuji Nohira	Symboli Bokujo	2:01.1
1985	Miho Shinzan	Masato Shibata	Tomojiro Tanaka	Kanji Tsutsumi	2:02.1
1986	Dyna Cosmos	Yukio Okabe	Minetsugu Sawa	Shadai Race Horse Co., Ltd.	2:02.1
1987	Sakura Star O	Shinji Azuma	Yuji Hirai	Sakura Commerce Co., Ltd.	2:01.9
1988	Yaeno Muteki	Katsuichi Nishiura	Mitsuo Ogino	Fuji Co., Ltd.	2:01.3
1989	Doctor Spurt	Hitoshi Matoba	Takashi Tsukazaki	Satoru Matsuoka	2:05.2
1990	Haku Taisei	Katsumi Minai	Tadashi Fuse	Shigeo Watanabe	2:02.2
1991	Tokai Teio	Takayuki Yasuda	Shoichi Matsumoto	Masanori Uchimura	2:01.8
1992	Mihono Bourbon	Sadahiro Kojima	Tameo Toyama	Mihono International Co., Ltd.	2:01.4
1993	Narita Taishin	Yutaka Take	Masaaki Okubo	Hidenori Yamaji	2:00.2
1994	Narita Brian	Katsumi Minai	Masaaki Okubo	Hidenori Yamaji	1:59.0
1995	Genuine	Yukio Okabe	Yasuhisa Matsuyama	Shadai Race Horse Co., Ltd.	2:02.5
1996	Ishino Sunday	Hirofumi Shii	Kenji Yamauchi	Ishino Co., Ltd.	2:00.7
1997	Sunny Brian	Naohiro Onishi	Senji Nakao	Moriyasu Miyazaki	2:02.0
1998	Seiun Sky	Norihiro Yokoyama	Kazutaka Yasuda	Masayuki Nishiyama	2:01.3
1999	T. M. Opera O	Ryuji Wada	Ichizo Iwamoto	Masatsugu Takezono	2:00.7
2000	Air Shakur	Yutaka Take	Hideyuki Mori	Lucky Field Co., Ltd.	2:01.8
2001	Agnes Tachyon	Hiroshi Kawachi	Hiroyuki Nagahama	Takao Watanabe	2:00.3
2002	No Reason	Brett Doyle	Yasuo Ikee	Shinji Maeda	1:58.5
2003	Neo Universe	Mirco Demuro	Tsutomu Setoguchi	Shadai Race Horse Co., Ltd.	2:01.2
2004	Daiwa Major	Mirco Demuro	Hiroyuki Uehara	Daiwa Shoji Co., Ltd.	1:58.6
2005	Deep Impact	Yutaka Take	Yasuo Ikee	Makoto Kaneko	1:59.2
2006	Meisho Samson	Mamoru Ishibashi	Tsutomu Setoguchi	Yoshio Matsumoto	1:59.9
2007	Victory	Katsuharu Tanaka	Hidetaka Otonashi	Hideko Kondo	1:59.9
2008	Captain Thule	Yuga Kawada	Hideyuki Mori	Shadai Race Horse Co., Ltd.	2:01.7
2009	Unrivaled	Yasunari Iwata	Yasuo Tomomichi	Sunday Racing	1:58.7
2010	Victoire Pisa	Yasunari Iwata	Katsuhiko Sumii	Yoshimi Ichikawa	2:00.8
2011	Orfevre (Note: The 2011 race took place at Tokyo Racecourse due to the 2011 Tohoku earthquake and tsunami)	Kenichi Ikezoe	Yasutoshi Ikee	Sunday Racing	2:00.6
2012	Gold Ship	Hiroyuki Uchida	Naosuke Sugai	Eiichi Kobayashi	2:01.3
2013	Logotype	Mirco Demuro	Tsuyoshi Tanaka	Teruya Yoshida	1:58.0
2014	Isla Bonita	Masayoshi Ebina	Hironori Kurita	Shadai Race Horse Co., Ltd.	1:59.6
2015	Duramente	Mirco Demuro	Noriyuki Hori	Sunday Racing	1:58.2
2016	Dee Majesty	Masayoshi Ebina	Yoshitaka Ninomiya	Masaru Shimada	1:57.9
2017	Al Ain	Kohei Matsuyama	Yasutoshi Ikee	Sunday Racing	1:57.8
2018	Epoca d'Oro	Keita Tosaki	Hideaki Fujiwara	Hidaka Breeders Union	2:00.8
2019	Saturnalia	Christophe Lemaire	Katsuhiko Sumii	Carrot Farm Co., Ltd.	1:58.1
2020	Contrail	Yuichi Fukunaga	Yoshito Yahagi	Shinji Maeda	2:00.7
2021	Efforia	Takeshi Yokoyama	Yuichi Shikato	Carrot Farm Co., Ltd.	2:00.6
2022	Geoglyph	Yuichi Fukunaga	Tetsuya Kimura	Sunday Racing	1:59.7
2023	Sol Oriens	Takeshi Yokoyama	Takahisa Tezuka	Shadai Race Horse Co., Ltd.	2:00.6
2024	Justin Milano	Keita Tosaki	Yasuo Tomomichi	Masahiro Miki	1:57.1
2025	Museum Mile	João Moreira	Daisuke Takayanagi	Sunday Racing	1:57.0
2026	Lovcen	Kohei Matsuyama	Haruki Sugiyama	Forest Racing	1:56.5

== Earlier winners ==
- 1939 - Rock Park
- 1940 - World Mine
- 1941 - St. Lite
- 1942 - Arbeit
- 1943 - Dielec
- 1944 - Kuri Yamato
- 1945 - no race
- 1946 - no race
- 1947 - Tokitsukaze
- 1948 - Hide Hikari
- 1949 - Tosa Midori
- 1950 - Kumono Hana
- 1951 - Tokino Minoru
- 1952 - Kurino Hana
- 1953 - Bostonian
- 1954 - Dainana Hoshu
- 1955 - Kegon
- 1956 - Hekiraku
- 1957 - Kazuyoshi
- 1958 - Taisei Hope
- 1959 - Wildeal
- 1960 - Kodama
- 1961 - Shin Tsubame
- 1962 - Yamano O
- 1963 - Meizui
- 1964 - Shinzan
- 1965 - Chitose O
- 1966 - Nihon Pillow Ace
- 1967 - Ryuzuki
- 1968 - Martis
- 1969 - Wild More
- 1970 - Tanino Moutiers
- 1971 - Hikaru Imai
- 1972 - Land Prince
- 1973 - Haiseiko
- 1974 - Kitano Kachidoki
- 1975 - Kaburaya O
- 1976 - Tosho Boy
- 1977 - Hard Berge
- 1978 - Fantast
- 1979 - Bingo Garoo
- 1980 - Hawaiian Image
- 1981 - Katsu Top Ace
- 1982 - Azuma Hunter
- 1983 - Mr. C. B.

== See also ==
- Horse racing in Japan
- List of Japanese flat horse races
