= Dai Yusaku =

Japanese Thoroughbred racehorse (1985–2013)

Dai Yusaku ダイユウサク
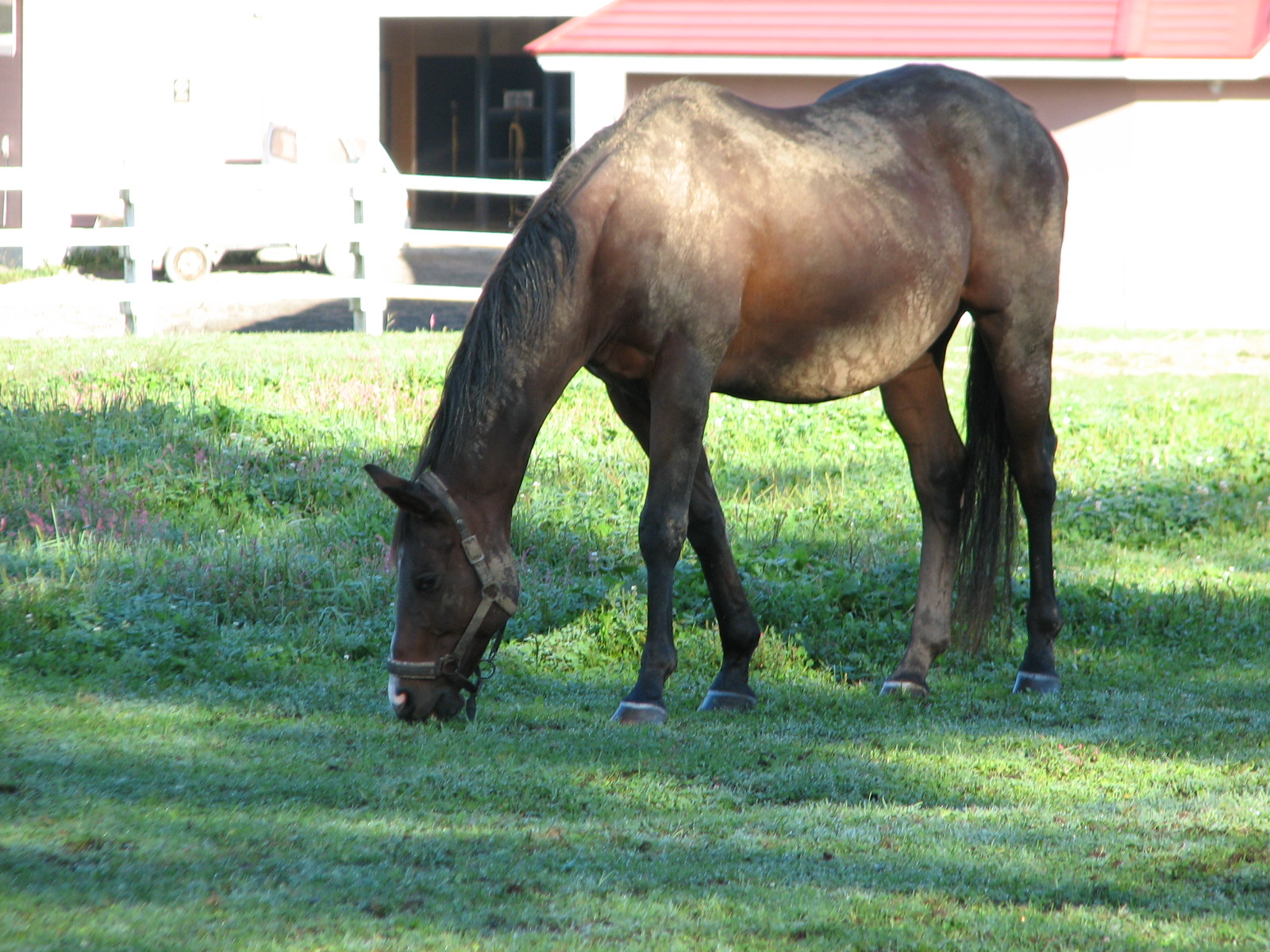
- Dai Yusaku in September 2005
- Sire: Nonoalco
- Grandsire: Nearctic
- Dam: Kuninokiyoko
- Damsire: Daitakahata
- Sex: Stallion
- Foaled: 12 June 1985
- Died: 8 December 2013 (aged 28)
- Country: Japan
- Colour: Bay
- Breeder: Yushun Bokujo
- Owner: Kohei Hashimoto
- Racing colours
- Trainer: Shigeharu Naito
- Jockey: Shigefumi Kumazawa
- Record: 38: 11-5-4
- Earnings: ¥376,823,600

Major wins
- Kyōto Kimpai (1991); Arima Kinen (1991)

Dai Yusaku (Japanese: ダイユウサク, Hepburn: Dai Yūsaku; 12 June 1985 – 8 December 2013) was a Japanese Thoroughbred racehorse and sire. He competed from 1988 to 1992, recording eleven wins in thirty-eight starts, including the Kyōto Kimpai and the Arima Kinen in 1991. He is best known for winning the 1991 Arima Kinen as a 137.9-1 outsider, defeating the overwhelming favorite Mejiro McQueen in a Japanese record time.

== Background ==
Dai Yusaku is a bay horse bred in Hokkaido by Yushun Bokujo. He was sired by the French-bred stallion Nonoalco, and his dam was Kuninokiyoko, a daughter of Daitakahata.

The horse was originally intended to be named "Daikousaku" by his owner, Kohei Hashimoto, combining the prefix "Dai" from his damsire and the name of his grandson, Kousaku. However, due to a handwriting error on the registration documents where the katakana character "コ" (ko) was written to resemble "ユ" (yu), the horse was officially registered as "Dai Yusaku". He was sent into training with Shigeharu Naito at the JRA's Ritto Training Center.

== Racing career ==
=== 1988 and 1989: Early career ===
Dai Yusaku debuted on October 30, 1988, in an allowance race on the dirt at Kyoto Racecourse, finishing eleventh. In his second start at Fukushima Racecourse, he finished fourteenth, trailing the winner by over seven seconds. Due to chronic shin splints and a weak back, he struggled in his early career and was briefly considered for retirement or a transition to jumping, though the latter was abandoned due to safety concerns.

He recorded his first victory on April 16, 1989, in a dirt allowance race at Niigata Racecourse. After securing another win on the turf at Kyoto in May, he became a regular mount for jockey Shigefumi Kumazawa. In September, he won a 1200-meter allowance race at Hanshin Racecourse, setting a new track record of 1:08.9 on a firm track.

=== 1990: Five-year-old season ===
Returning from a layoff in June 1990, Dai Yusaku finished fourth in the CBC Sho (GII). He later won the Moonlight Handicap (Allowance) at Chukyo Racecourse in September, the Topaz Stakes (Open) at Kyoto in November, and the Asuka Stakes (Open) at Kyoto in December.

=== 1991: Six-year-old season ===
Dai Yusaku began his 1991 campaign by winning the Kyōto Kimpai (GIII) on January 5. He finished second in the Sankei Osaka Hai (GII) in March before being sidelined for six months due to a quarter crack.

Returning in the autumn, he finished unplaced in the Kyoto Daishoten (GII) and the Swan Stakes (GII), and fifth in the Mile Championship (GI). On December 7, he won the Hanshin Racecourse Renovation Memorial (Open).

On December 22, Dai Yusaku contested the Arima Kinen (GI) at Nakayama Racecourse. Despite his recent open-class victory, he was largely ignored by bettors and started as the 14th favorite (second-to-last) at odds of 137.9-1. The race was heavily favored towards Mejiro McQueen, who started at 1.7-1. Ridden by Kumazawa, Dai Yusaku tracked the leaders and launched a strong late charge on the inside rail, overtaking Mejiro McQueen in the final straight to win by 0.2 seconds. His winning time of 2:30.6 set a new Japanese record for 2500 meters on turf. The victory produced a massive upset, with the win ticket paying ¥13,790.

=== 1992: Seven-year-old season ===
Dai Yusaku remained in training for the 1992 season but failed to win in six starts. He finished sixth in the Sankei Ōsaka Hai (GII), ninth in the Tennō Shō (Spring, GI), and eighth in the Yasuda Kinen (GI) and Takarazuka Kinen (GI). Following a fifteenth-place finish in the Swan Stakes (GII) on October 31, he was retired from racing.

== Statistics ==
The following table details all 38 starts and 1 scheduled entry of Dai Yusaku's racing career based on official netkeiba and JBIS records.

Date	Distance (Condition)	Race	Class	Course	Odds (Favourite)	Field	Finish	Time	Winning (Losing) Margin	Winner (2nd Place)	Jockey	Ref
1988 – three-year-old season
Oct 30	Dirt 1800 m (Standard)	4-Y-O Allowance	Allowance	Kyoto	56.1 (10th)	11	11th	2:06.7	13.0	Kyoei Wells	Hideyoshi Mizohashi	
Nov 12	Turf 1800 m (Firm)	4-Y-O Maiden	Maiden	Fukushima	81.3 (13th)	14	14th	2:00.0	7.3	Kyoei Touch	Seiji Harada	
1989 – four-year-old season
Mar 18	Dirt 1700 m (Standard)	5-Y-O Allowance	Allowance	Chukyo	8.4 (4th)	10	5th	1:51.9	0.7	Eishin Kansai	Hideyoshi Mizohashi	
Mar 25	Dirt 1000 m (Muddy)	5-Y-O Allowance	Allowance	Chukyo	11.9 (7th)	16	8th	1:02.1	0.7	Ascot Jaguar	Hideyoshi Mizohashi	
Apr 16	Dirt 1700 m (Sloppy)	5-Y-O Allowance	Allowance	Niigata	26.7 (10th)	12	1st	1:47.4	–0.5	(Hakusan Coppel)	Takayoshi Deguchi	
Apr 29	Dirt 1200 m (Sloppy)	Sanjo Tokubetsu	Allowance	Niigata	10.7 (5th)	8	4th	1:13.8	1.1	Gin Sekai	Takayoshi Deguchi	
May 13	Turf 1600 m (Soft)	5-Y-O Allowance	Allowance	Kyoto	15.6 (9th)	18	1st	1:37.9	–0.0	(Great Napoleon)	Shigefumi Kumazawa	
May 27	Turf 2000 m (Firm)	5-Y-O Allowance	Allowance	Hanshin	3.5 (1st)	13	2nd	2:05.0	0.1	Hirayoshi Rookie	Shigefumi Kumazawa	
Jun 10	Turf 2000 m (Soft)	Taka Tokubetsu	Allowance	Hanshin	5.2 (3rd)	12	2nd	2:04.6	0.1	Wonder Merveille	Shigefumi Kumazawa	
Jun 25	Turf 2000 m (Soft)	Ontake Tokubetsu	Allowance	Chukyo	2.9 (1st)	15	1st	2:01.6	–0.2	(Mint Star)	Shigefumi Kumazawa	
Jul 9	Turf 2000 m (Good)	Takamatsunomiya Hai	GII	Chukyo	47.8 (11th)	14	7th	2:00.3	1.4	Mejiro Ardan	Seiji Harada	
Aug 12	Turf 1800 m (Firm)	Hazuki Sho	Allowance	Kokura	Scratched	12	Scratched			Senshu Ururu	Scratched	
Sep 10	Turf 1200 m (Firm)	4-Y-O Allowance	Allowance	Hanshin	4.3 (2nd)	14	1st	R1:08.9	–0.6	(Tireil)	Shigefumi Kumazawa	
Sep 30	Turf 1400 m (Firm)	Koto Tokubetsu	Allowance	Hanshin	1.4 (1st)	14	1st	1:21.8	–0.0	(Hakuyo Command)	Shigefumi Kumazawa	
Oct 22	Dirt 1400 m (Standard)	Kifune Stakes	Allowance	Kyoto	3.1 (1st)	16	10th	1:26.1	1.8	Dancing Tham	Shigefumi Kumazawa	
Nov 11	Turf 2000 m (Firm)	Hiei Stakes	Allowance	Kyoto	3.3 (1st)	14	2nd	2:01.5	0.1	Million Highline	Shigefumi Kumazawa	
Dec 3	Turf 2000 m (Firm)	Golden Whip Trophy	Allowance	Kyoto	1.8 (1st)	12	2nd	2:00.6	0.2	Satsuki Oasis	Katsumi Minai	
Dec 16	Turf 1600 m (Firm)	Sakasegawa Stakes	Allowance	Hanshin	2.0 (1st)	12	3rd	1:35.7	0.6	Meisho Masamune	Shigefumi Kumazawa	
1990 – five-year-old season
Jun 24	Turf 1200 m (Good)	CBC Sho	GII	Chukyo	19.9 (9th)	16	4th	1:09.1	0.8	Passing Shot	Shigefumi Kumazawa	
Jul 7	Turf 1200 m (Firm)	July Stakes	Allowance	Chukyo	3.2 (2nd)	14	4th	1:09.6	0.9	Louis Tate	Shigefumi Kumazawa	
Sep 9	Turf 1200 m (Firm)	Centaur Stakes	GIII	Chukyo	12.1 (5th)	11	3rd	1:08.6	0.1	Aco Caesar	Yoshiyuki Muramoto	
Sep 29	Turf 2000 m (Good)	Moonlight Handicap	Allowance	Chukyo	1.6 (1st)	9	1st	2:01.3	–0.6	(Yamahisa Boy)	Yoshiyuki Muramoto	
Oct 28	Turf 2000 m (Firm)	Tennō Shō (Autumn)	GI	Tokyo	33.8 (11th)	18	7th	1:59.0	0.8	Yaeno Muteki	Yoshiyuki Muramoto	
Nov 25	Turf 2000 m (Firm)	Topaz Stakes	Open	Kyoto	1.9 (1st)	14	1st	2:00.1	–0.7	(Nichido Thunder)	Shigefumi Kumazawa	
Dec 8	Turf 1600 m (Firm)	Asuka Stakes	Open	Kyoto	1.3 (1st)	10	1st	1:35.0	–0.3	(Yagura Stella)	Shigefumi Kumazawa	
1991 – six-year-old season
Jan 5	Turf 2000 m (Firm)	Kyōto Kimpai	GIII	Kyoto	2.7 (1st)	16	1st	2:00.1	–0.2	(White Arrow)	Shigefumi Kumazawa	
Mar 31	Turf 2000 m (Good)	Sankei Osaka Hai	GII	Kyoto	3.9 (3rd)	10	2nd	2:01.7	0.2	White Stone	Shigefumi Kumazawa	
Sep 15	Turf 2000 m (Good)	Asahi Challenge Cup	GII	Chukyo	9.6 (5th)	16	7th	1:59.9	0.8	Nuevo Tosho	Shigefumi Kumazawa	
Oct 6	Turf 2400 m (Firm)	Kyoto Daishoten	GII	Kyoto	9.3 (3rd)	7	5th	2:28.5	2.0	Mejiro McQueen	Shigefumi Kumazawa	
Oct 26	Turf 1400 m (Firm)	Swan Stakes	GII	Kyoto	13.9 (6th)	16	4th	1:20.9	0.3	K.S. Miracle	Shigefumi Kumazawa	
Nov 17	Turf 1600 m (Firm)	Mile Championship	GI	Kyoto	15.4 (5th)	15	5th	1:35.3	0.5	Daitaku Helios	Shigefumi Kumazawa	
Dec 7	Turf 1600 m (Firm)	Hanshin Renovation Memorial	Open	Hanshin	3.7 (2nd)	16	1st	1:36.1	–0.1	(Stage Hero)	Shigefumi Kumazawa	
Dec 22	Turf 2500 m (Firm)	Arima Kinen	GI	Nakayama	137.9 (14th)	15	1st	R2:30.6	–0.2	(Mejiro McQueen)	Shigefumi Kumazawa	
1992 – seven-year-old season
Apr 5	Turf 2000 m (Firm)	Sankei Ōsaka Hai	GII	Hanshin	17.1 (4th)	8	6th	2:07.1	0.8	Tokai Teio	Shigefumi Kumazawa	
Apr 26	Turf 3200 m (Firm)	Tennō Shō (Spring)	GI	Kyoto	46.0 (5th)	14	9th	3:24.0	4.0	Mejiro McQueen	Shigefumi Kumazawa	
May 17	Turf 1600 m (Firm)	Yasuda Kinen	GI	Tokyo	21.8 (8th)	18	8th	1:34.6	0.8	Yamanin Zephyr	Shigefumi Kumazawa	
Jun 14	Turf 2200 m (Firm)	Takarazuka Kinen	GI	Hanshin	11.5 (4th)	13	8th	2:21.8	3.2	Mejiro Palmer	Shigefumi Kumazawa	
Jul 12	Turf 2000 m (Good)	Takamatsunomiya Hai	GII	Chukyo	9.3 (5th)	18	14th	2:02.7	2.1	Mr. Spain	Shigefumi Kumazawa	
Oct 31	Turf 1400 m (Firm)	Swan Stakes	GII	Kyoto	15.3 (6th)	16	15th	1:23.8	2.4	Dictor Girl	Shigefumi Kumazawa	

- R indicates a track record.

== Stud career ==
Following his retirement, Dai Yusaku stood at Yagi Bokujo in Hokkaido. He sired only 17 registered foals, with his most notable progeny being Grand Oracion, who won the Grand Mix in the regional NAR circuit. He was retired from stud duties in 1998 and spent his remaining years at the Urakawa Yushun Village AERU facility. Dai Yusaku died of old age on December 8, 2013, at the age of 28.

== Pedigree ==
Pedigree of Dai Yusaku (JPN)
Sire Nonoalco (FR) 1971	Nearctic (CAN); 1954	Nearco	Pharos
Sire Nonoalco (FR) 1971	Nearctic (CAN); 1954	Nearco	Nogara
Sire Nonoalco (FR) 1971	Nearctic (CAN); 1954	Lady Angela	Hyperion
Sire Nonoalco (FR) 1971	Nearctic (CAN); 1954	Lady Angela	Sister Sarah
Sire Nonoalco (FR) 1971	Seximee (FR); 1966	Hasty Road	Roman
Sire Nonoalco (FR) 1971	Seximee (FR); 1966	Hasty Road	Traffic Court
Sire Nonoalco (FR) 1971	Seximee (FR); 1966	Jambo	Crafty Admiral
Sire Nonoalco (FR) 1971	Seximee (FR); 1966	Jambo	Bank Account
Dam Kuninokiyoko (JPN) 1977	Daitakahata (JPN); 1962	Hindostan	Bois Roussel
Dam Kuninokiyoko (JPN) 1977	Daitakahata (JPN); 1962	Hindostan	Sonibai
Dam Kuninokiyoko (JPN) 1977	Daitakahata (JPN); 1962	Diane Ke	Lillolkid
Dam Kuninokiyoko (JPN) 1977	Daitakahata (JPN); 1962	Diane Ke	Bonnie Luna
Dam Kuninokiyoko (JPN) 1977	Kuninohana (JPN); 1967	Never Beat	Never Say Die
Dam Kuninokiyoko (JPN) 1977	Kuninohana (JPN); 1967	Never Beat	Bride Elect
Dam Kuninokiyoko (JPN) 1977	Kuninohana (JPN); 1967	Akiizumi	Kurinohana
Dam Kuninokiyoko (JPN) 1977	Kuninohana (JPN); 1967	Akiizumi	Asamidori

- Dai Yusaku is outcross within five generations.

== See also ==
- Thoroughbred racing in Japan
- Arima Kinen
