= Daitaku Helios =

Japanese Thoroughbred racehorse (1987–2008)

Daitaku Helios ダイタクヘリオス
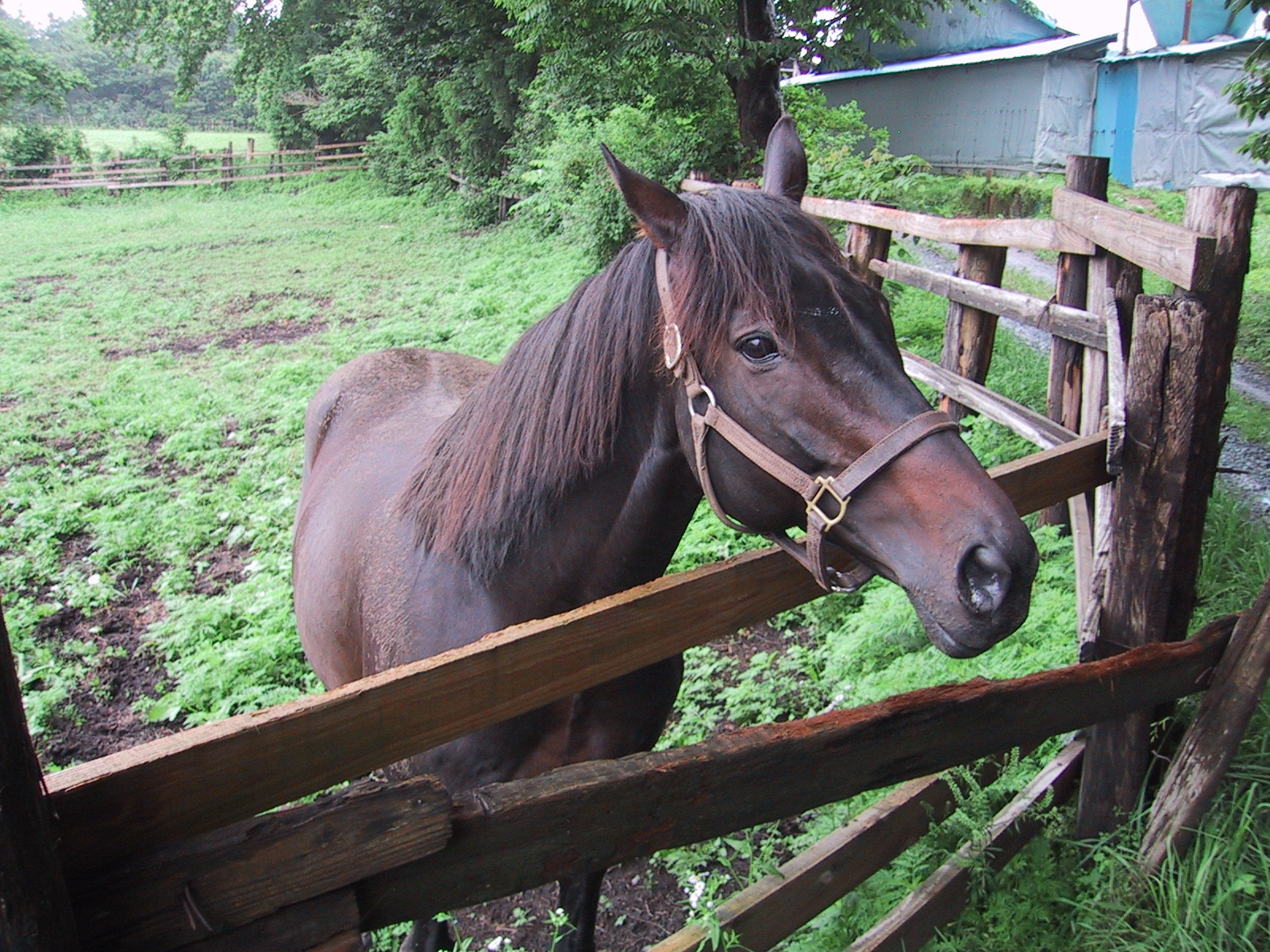
- Daitaku Helios at Yamauchi Farm in 2003.
- Breed: Thoroughbred
- Sire: Bizen Nishiki (JPN)
- Grandsire: Dandy Lute (FR)
- Dam: Never Ichiban (JPN)
- Damsire: Never Beat (GB)
- Sex: Stallion
- Foaled: April 10, 1987
- Died: December 12, 2008 (aged 21)
- Country: Japan
- Color: Dark Bay
- Breeder: Shimizu Bokujo
- Owner: Masaichi Nakamura
- Racing colors
- Trainer: Yasuo Umeda
- Jockey: Shigehiko Kishi; Yoshiyasu Tajima; Yutaka Take; Kiyoaki Ueno; Tadashi Kayo
- Record: 35: 10–6–1
- Earnings: ¥689,952,400

Major wins
- Crystal Cup (1990); Takamatsunomiya Hai (1991); Mainichi Okan (1992); Yomiuri Milers Cup (1991, 1992); Mile Championship (1991, 1992)

Daitaku Helios (Japanese: ダイタクヘリオス, Hepburn: Daitaku Heriosu; April 10, 1987 – December 12, 2008) was a Japanese Thoroughbred racehorse. With a total of 10 career wins, including 7 graded stakes victories, he became the fourth horse in history to earn over 600 million yen in prize money, following Symboli Rudolf, Oguri Cap, and Mejiro McQueen.

He won the Mile Championship in 1991 and 1992, becoming only the second horse in history to win the race two years in a row since Nihon Pillow Winner. His other victories included the 1991 and 1992 Milers Cup, the 1991 Takamatsunomiya Hai, the 1992 Mainichi Ōkan, and the 1990 Crystal Cup. He gained popularity during his racing career as a fast, eccentric horse with a fiery temperament, known for his bizarre personality.

Daitaku Helios is also known as the sire of Daitaku Yamato, who won the 2000 Sprinters Stakes as the 16th favourite and was named the JRA Award for Best Domestic-Bred Sire and Best Sprinter in 2000.

== Background ==
Daitaku Helios was foaled on April 10, 1987, by Never Ichiban at Shimizu Farm, in Biratori, Hokkaido. His sire Bizen Nishiki was often called a contemporary of Symboli Rudolf during the Japanese Classic Races of 1984.

Daitaku Helios had a docile temperament, required little attention, and never fell ill. His dam, Never Ichiban, had turned-in legs, but this trait was not passed on to her foal. According to Tetsuro Shimizu, “He wasn’t a particularly striking-looking horse (omitted) nor did he give the impression that he would be a great runner” “His build itself felt solid, but his head was unreasonably large, and he certainly wasn’t a horse you’d call handsome (omitted) … Since his overall presence was significantly inferior to Sweet Love’s, it was hard to imagine he’d rise to this level.” “Judging by his build, I thought he was a horse who’d top out at the 9 million yen class (omitted),” he recalls. In October of his two-year-old year, he was moved to the Miya Farm in the neighboring town of Biratori. He entered the training phase, but his movement remained unremarkable, and other horses from his same crop were the ones generating expectations.

Like the rest of the older siblings, including Sweet Love, Daitaku Helios became the property of Masakazu Nakamura. His name originates from a combination of Nakamura’s prefix “Daitaku” and “Helios,” the Greek god of the sun. Like his siblings, Daitaku Helios came under the care of trainer Yasuo Umeda and entered his stable in July 1989, when he turned three. Immediately after his arrival, Maeno (the stable hand in charge), Murabe (the training assistant), and Shigehiko Kishi (an apprentice jockey assigned to the stable) assessed him, believing, “There are no duds in this bloodline. I think he’ll rise to the 9-million-yen class”.

== Racing career ==
=== 1989: three-year-old season ===
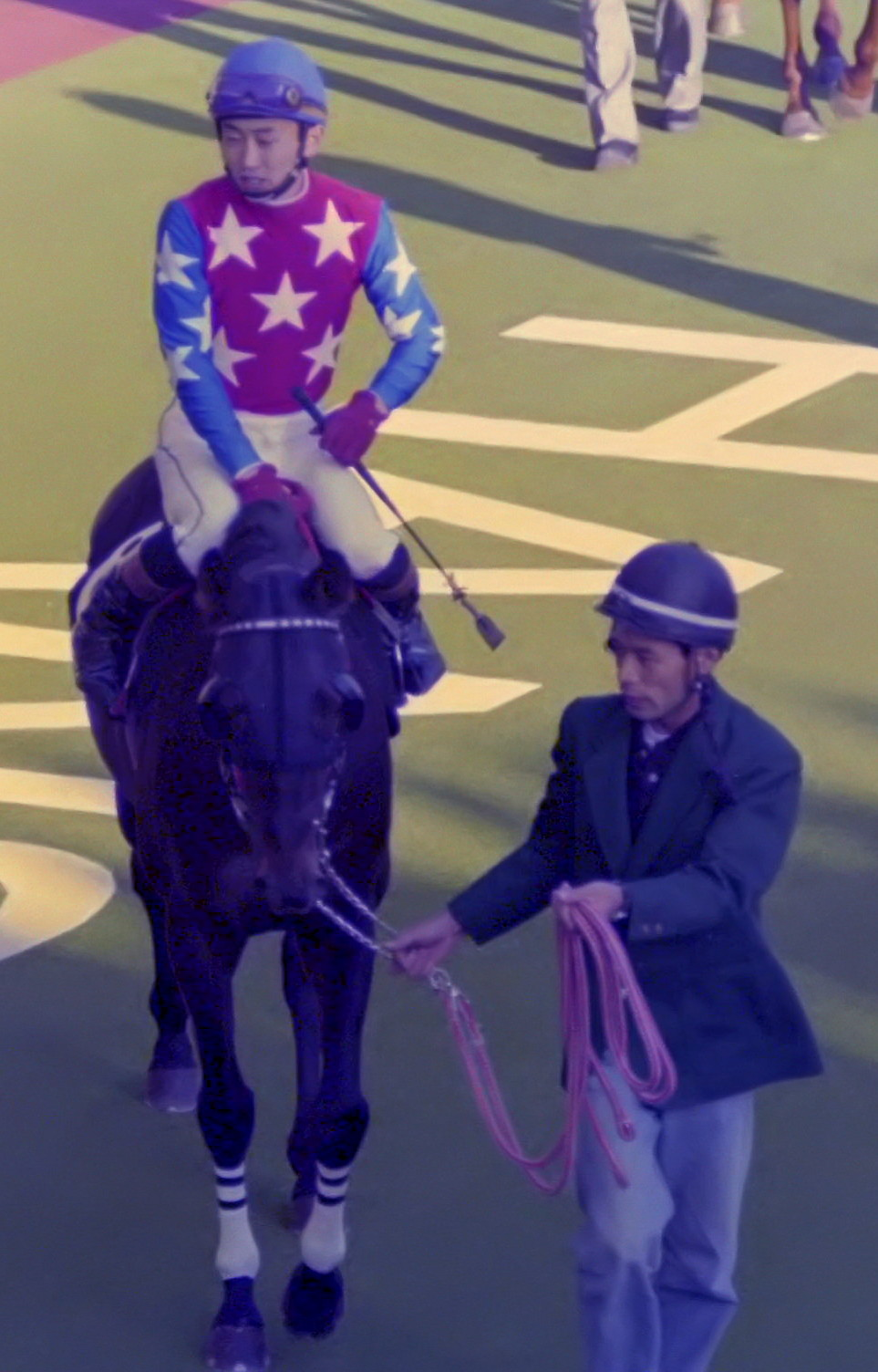
Daitaku Helios' regular jockey Shigehiko Kishi riding L-Way Win at Hanshin Racecourse in 1995.

On October 7, Daitaku Helios made his debut at Kyoto Racecourse in a maiden race (1,400 meters on turf) with Shigehiko Kishi in the saddle, finishing third. From then until his retirement, Kishi would serve as his regular jockey. On the 21st, in his second maiden race (1,200 meters on dirt), he broke away in the home stretch but was overtaken by Nichido Thunder, finishing second. On the 29th, in his third maiden race (1600 meters on turf), run back-to-back, he secured his first victory by leading from start to finish. Two weeks later, on November 11, he made his first graded stakes appearance in the Daily Hai Sansai Stakes, taking on higher-class competition. He pulled away from the field early and led but was difficult to control throughout the race. His pace slowed in the home stretch, and he was overtaken. However, he did not suffer a crushing defeat, securing fourth place, about three and a half lengths behind the winner, Yamanin Global. Kishi reportedly remarked, “He was uncooperative throughout the race and didn’t run properly (omitted)… Even against such strong competition, he ran this well despite an inconsistent performance. He’s a horse with real potential.”

On December 9 at Hanshin Racecourse, he won the Sazanka Sho (for horses earning 4 million yen or less) by leading from start to finish, securing his second victory. Racing back-to-back again, he made his Group 1 debut on the 17th in the Hanshin Sansai Stakes. He was the fourth favorite at 7.9-to-1 odds. He broke from the gate and led from the start, running alone for a while down the stretch, but was overtaken just before the finish line by the seventh favorite, Kogane Taifu, who had been lying in wait at the back of the field, finishing second by a neck. Taking this as an opportunity, Umeda set the Satsuki Shō as his major goal for the spring of the horse’s four-year-old season.

=== 1990: four-year-old season ===
He kicked off his season in the Shinzan Kinen on January 14, starting as the fourth favorite. Drawing the outside post, he was unable to take the lead and settled into third place. In the stretch, he closed in on Nichido Thunder, who had pulled away from second place, but fell half a length short, finishing second. Jockey Kishi reflected, “If I had passed him earlier, we might have won. It was a tactical mistake.” Next, on February 11, in the Kisaragi Sho on a heavy track, he took the lead and ran at the front, but failed to finish strongly in the stretch, placing sixth. On March 25, in the Spring Stakes—a trial race for the Satsuki Sho—he again tried to take the lead and run at the front, but Strong Crown challenged him from the outside. The two horses battled it out, pulling away from the field and setting a fast pace, covering the first 1,000 meters in 57.9 seconds. In the home stretch, he ran out of steam and finished 11th. He failed to place in two consecutive races over distances of a mile or longer. Kishi attributed the losses not to the distance, but to the heavy going in the Kisagari Sho and the grueling pace in the Spring Stakes. However, Umeda and the team abandoned their goal of competing in the Satsuki Sho and other Classics, and returned the horse to Ritto Training Center. Umeda determined that Daitaku Helios was best suited for short distances and decided to pursue that route from then on.

On April 14, the horse traveled to Tokyo to compete in the 1,200-meter Crystal Cup, where he was the second favorite at 4.0-to-1 odds. From the start, he let Safari Cap take the lead and positioned himself in second place right behind him. In a fast-paced race, he broke away in the straight and widened the gap with the field behind him. He continued to pull away, crossing the finish line by two and a half lengths. Kishi celebrated his first graded stakes victory with such a commanding win that he was able to look back twice just before the finish line. It was also the first graded stakes title for both Umeda and a Bizen Nishiki progeny. Next, on May 13, he competed in the Aoi Stakes. As it was a handicap race, he carried the heaviest weight among the field—59 kilograms, which was 3 to 4 kilograms heavier than the other colts of his own generation. He was the second favorite. He let the favorite, Western To-Yo, and the 13th favorite, Ambitious Hope, go ahead, positioning himself in third place in a good spot. He made a late charge down the stretch but fell a neck short of Ambitious Hope, crossing the finish line in second place. However, Ambitious Hope was disqualified for veering off course in the stretch, and Daitaku Helios was awarded first place as a result, securing his fourth victory and extending his winning streak. On June 3, in the New Zealand Trophy Yonsai Stakes, he let Safari Cap take the lead just like in the Crystal Cup and settled into second place, two lengths behind. He broke away in the home stretch amid a fast pace, but was overtaken on the outside by Music Time J.—the third favorite who had been waiting in the middle of the pack—and finished second by a length and a half.

In the eight months since his debut, he had competed in 12 races, but this marked his first extended break. He spent his summer vacation in his hometown. In the fall, his training was delayed after he injured his leg during transport following a spell out in the pasture. Despite still suffering from muscle pain, he made his comeback in the Mile Championship on November 18. He trailed from the back after the restart, failed to finish strongly, and finished 17th. Returning to a 1,200-meter distance, he finished 4th as the 3rd favorite in the Sirius Stakes on December 2. In the Sprinters Stakes on December 16, he started as the 4th favorite. Along with Narcisse Noir and others, a total of four horses battled for the lead, resulting in a fast pace that saw the first 600 meters covered in 32.4 seconds. In the home stretch, he was overtaken by the horses that had been waiting in the rear. Bamboo Memory, who had broken away, won in a time that set a new Japanese record. Daitaku Helios struggled to find his stride and finished fifth, more than four and a half lengths behind Bamboo Memory.

=== 1991: five-year-old season ===
He kicked off his season with a fourth-place finish in the Yodo Tankyori Stakes on February 3. For his subsequent races, he had a choice between the Milers Cup on February 24 or the Chunichi Shimbun Hai on March 3. However, since Horino Winner—who had been seen as the overwhelming favorite—withdrew from the Yomiuri Milers Cup, his connections opted for the Yomiuri Milers Cup. He was the fourth favorite. Three horses battled for the lead, setting a fast pace, but Daitaku Helios did not join them, instead holding back and running in fourth place. In the home stretch, as the three horses in front began to tire, he broke away from the innermost part of the track. From there, he steadily widened the gap, running unchallenged and crossing the finish line five lengths ahead of the field. This was his second Group race victory, and his winning time of 1:41.2 beat the course record of 1:41.5 set by Rikisan Nana in 1990 by 0.3 seconds. Jockey Yutaka Take reflected, “My impression from watching this horse race up until now was that he had a burst of speed but would run out of steam just before the finish line (omitted)... But look at that—a commanding victory by five lengths. It was completely different from the impression I had. I think he’s really gained a lot of strength.”

Next, in the Lord Derby Challenge Trophy on March 17, he was assigned the No. 1 post and was the favorite, but after leading from the front, he faded and finished fourth. In the Keio Hai Spring Cup on April 21, he was unable to break away from fourth place and finished sixth. Then, in the Yasuda Kinen on May 12, he started as the 10th favorite at 28.7-to-1 odds. Starting from gate 13, he tracked the field from the middle of the pack on the outside in a fast pace. In the home stretch, he passed the front-runners from the outside to break clear but was overtaken just before the finish line by Daiichi Ruby, who was closing in from even further out, finishing second by a length and a quarter. In the CBC Sho on June 23, although he took the lead from the start, he was unable to run to his full potential on the heavy track and faded, finishing fifth.

On July 7, he competed in the 2,000-meter Takamatsunomiya Hai with Tadashi Kayou in the saddle. Among the eight starters, Daiichi Ruby, winner of the Yasuda Kinen, was the favorite at 1.4-to-1; White Arrow, winner of the Aichi Hai under the same track and distance, was at 6.3-to-1; and Towa Ruby, coming off a second-place finish in the Kinko Sho over 1,800 meters at Chukyo, was at 7.5-to-1. In contrast, Daitaku Helios was the fifth favorite at 11.7-to-1. Umeda instructed Kayo to take the lead at the final turn and to drive the horse forward without waiting for the closing Daiichi Ruby. Starting from gate 1, the horse took the lead. It ceded the lead to Towa Ruby and settled into second place. Meanwhile, Daiichi Ruby was in third place behind them, with the three horses running at a distance from one another. Towa Ruby set a fast pace but eventually lost momentum at the third turn. Daitaku Helios took the lead, with Daiichi Ruby in second place as they entered the final turn. In the home stretch, as planned, he was urged on immediately and established a lead. In response, Daiichi Ruby attempted to close the gap with a late surge from the outside. The two horses were neck and neck as they crossed the finish line. A photo finish confirmed that Daitaku Helios had won by a nose. This marked his third graded stakes victory, a one-two finish that was the exact opposite of the Yasuda Kinen and was hailed as “avenging the defeat in the Yasuda Kinen”. For Kayo, it was his first graded stakes victory in a year and a half, since winning the Winter Stakes in 1989 with Marubutsu Superior.

He began the fall season in the Mainichi Ōkan on October 6, where he was the fifth favorite. He broke away alone from the start but was overtaken by Prekrasnie, who had been in second place, just before the finish line, finishing second by a half-length. After finishing 9th in the Swan Stakes on October 26, he competed in the Mile Championship on November 17. He was the fourth favorite at 11.8-to-1 odds, behind Daiichi Ruby (1.8-to-1), K. S. Miracle (4.3-to-1), who had won the Swan Stakes, and Bamboo Memory (10.6-to-1). Umeda had instructed Kishi not to race at the front.

Starting from gate 12, he raced near the front. He initially tried to hold back behind the two horses that had aggressively taken the lead, but sensing Daitaku Helios’ momentum, Kishi broke his instructions and moved up to challenge for the lead at the third turn. He picked up speed on the downhill section of the turn, overtook them, and took the lead alone. Daitaku Helios, who had set a slow pace, passed the final turn while extending his lead and was running unchallenged down the home stretch. By the 200-meter mark, he had built a five-length lead. Although his pace gradually slowed afterward and the lead was cut, he crossed the finish line with a two-and-a-half-length margin. He held on to win, securing his first GI victory. He then competed in the Arima Kinen. Running in third place behind the front-runners Twin Turbo and Prekrasnie, he finished in fifth place.

=== 1992: six-year-old season ===
He kicked off the season on March 1 in the Milers Cup. Daiichi Ruby, who had won the Sprinters Stakes at the end of the previous year, was the favorite at 1.7-to-1 odds, followed by the second favorite at 5.0-to-1, and started the race carrying a weight of 60 kilograms. While Milford Slew set a fast pace at the front, Daiichi Ruby tracked him in fourth place, just behind the leader, and broke away at the final turn. With Daiichi Ruby unable to mount a challenge, he ran unchallenged, crossing the finish line first by five lengths to win the Milers Cup for the second consecutive year. Next, in the Keio Hai Spring Cup on April 25, he started as the second favorite behind Daiichi Ruby. He entered the home stretch in a good position but failed to finish strongly, placing fourth. In the Yasuda Kinen on May 17, he raced in a good position on the inside, moved out to the outside in the home stretch but failed to finish strongly, finishing 6th. In the Takarazuka Kinen on June 14, he turned into the home stretch in second place behind the pacesetting Mejiro Palmer but failed to finish strongly, finishing 5th.

After a summer break, he returned in the fall for the Mainichi Okan on October 11. He was the fourth favorite, behind Nice Nature, Sakura Yamato O, and Ikuno Dictus. Starting from the innermost gate, he got off to a good start and took the lead to set the pace. In the home stretch, he held off the challenges from Ikuno Dictus and Nice Nature to cross the finish line first. This was his sixth Group Race victory for Daitaku Helios. His winning time of 1:45.6 beat the course and Japanese record of 1:46.0—set by Sakura Yutaka O in the 1986 Mainichi Okan—by 0.4 seconds. Then, in the Tennō Shō (Autumn) on November 1, he started as the third favorite behind Tokai Teio and Nice Nature. He contested the lead with Mejiro Palmer, but both horses faded, and he finished eighth.

On November 28, he competed in the Mile Championship. The four-year-old filly Shinko Lovely, who was on a four-race winning streak, was the 1.41-to-1 favorite, while he was the 2.00-to-1 second favorite. Umeda gave Kishi the same instructions as the previous year: not to race at the front. As instructed from the start, he did not go for the lead but settled into fourth place. He took the lead on the downhill stretch of the third turn. He turned into the home stretch with a clear lead. Although Shinko Lovely and Nice Nature closed in from behind, he held them off and crossed the finish line first by a length and a half. This marked his second Group 1 victory and made him only the second horse in history to win the Mile Championship two years in a row, following Nihon Pillow Winner, who won back-to-back titles in 1984 and 1985. His total prize money reached 675,952,400 yen, making him the fourth horse in history to surpass 600 million yen, following Symboli Rudolf, Oguri Cap, and Mejiro McQueen. Furthermore, his winning time of 1:33.3 beat the race record of 1:33.6 set by Passing Shot in 1990 by 0.3 seconds and surpassed the course record of 1:33.5 set by Aino Crespin in 1977 by 0.2 seconds.

At the time, owner Nakamura was bedridden due to illness. Nakamura had hoped to see Daitaku Helios continue racing the following year and beyond, as he wanted to watch him run. However, Umeda persuaded Nakamura by pointing out that the horse breeding industry had high expectations for him as a stallion and arguing that, “while not an airplane, he suffers from ‘metal fatigue’”, leading to the decision to retire him at the end of that year. With the Sprinters Stakes on December 20 designated as his retirement race, he started as the favorite in that race. He ran from the back of the pack from the start and failed to make a move, finishing in 4th place. He was set to retire after this, but Nakamura, who was hospitalized at the time, expressed a wish to see Daitaku Helios run one more time on the TV in his hospital room. Consequently, he was rushed into back-to-back races and entered the Arima Kinen on December 27. He broke from the gate alongside Mejiro Palmer and led the race, but Daitaku Helios was left to push the pace, causing him to start to fade. While Mejiro Palmer held on to the lead until he win, Daitaku Helios fell back and finished in 12th place. This became his actual retirement race.

On January 31, 1993, a retirement ceremony was held for him at Kyoto Racecourse. With his regular jockey, Kishi, in the saddle and wearing the No. 18 saddle blanket from his back-to-back Mile Championship wins, he ran down the home stretch. A carrot blanket was then placed on him as well. Because he had gained popularity as a unique character during his active career, several years after his retirement, he was introduced on the JRA’s official website as the “Comedy King with Two GI Wins”. Additionally, during his active career, he was often depicted in a humorous and entertaining manner as an extremely eccentric character in many manga.

== Stud career and death ==
Daitaku Yamato, a foal sired by Daitaku Helios at the 2000 Mile Championship.

In 1996, he began his career as a stallion at the Monbetsu Stud Farm operated by the Hidaka Horse Breeders Association. A syndicate was formed with a total of 60 shares, each priced at 4 million yen, for a total of 240 million yen. Since Inari One and Mihono Bourbon were also stabled at the same farm, visitors reportedly came year-round without interruption. In his first year, he completed breeding quickly and achieved a conception rate exceeding 90 percent, earning him a warm welcome from the stud farm staff; however, on the downside, he often lay down while grazing, making grooming a major challenge. When he would lie down during the snowmelt and the mud on his body dried, his “massive black-bay coat would transform into a gray one,” and grooming him took more than twice as long as it did for other horses. One day while out to pasture, he lay down so frequently that people grew concerned and went to check on him, only to find that he was simply sleeping while eating fresh grass. According to Kazuhiko Yokoo, he described this behavior as “unconventional—I’ve never heard of a horse like this before.”

In his first season, Daitaku Helios covered 60 broodmares. One of those crops, Daitaku Yamato, won the 2000 Sprinters Stakes despite being the least favored among the entrants, and that same year was awarded the JRA Award for Best Domestic-Bred Sire and the JRA Award for Best Sprinter. In 2003, he was moved to Yamauchi Farm in Hachinohe, and retired from stud duty and was pensioned in 2008 due to a decline in conception rates and old age. He died at the age of 22 in the early morning of December 12, 2008, shortly after being pensioned. According to farm staff, he was found dead just as they were about to take him out to pasture that morning.

== In popular culture ==
An anthropomorphized version of Daitaku Helios appears as a character in the Japanese multimedia franchise Umamusume: Pretty Derby, voiced by Aya Yamane. She is depicted as a perpetually upbeat gyaru that speaks in gyaru slang (localized as zoomer slang in the global release of the mobile game) which her peers struggle to comprehend. Helios is best friends with Mejiro Palmer, who similarly struggles to understand her usage of slang, but picks up on and uses herself. She has an unrequited crush on Daiichi Ruby, whom she regularly makes unsuccessful romantic advances towards, but nonetheless persists with her courtship attempts. A theatrical act titled Umamusume: Pretty Derby The Stage -Sprinter's Story premiered in 2023 and features Daitaku Helios along with Daiichi Ruby, K.S.Miracle, and Yamanin Zephyr.

== Racing form ==
The following racing form is based on information available on JBIS search and netkeiba.com.

Date	Age	Track	Name	Grade	Distance	Field	Finished	Time	Jockey	Winner (Runner-up)
Oct 7, 1989	2	Kyoto	Maiden Race		1400m	4	3rd	1:24.7	Shigehiko Kishi	Osumi Roch
Oct 21, 1989	2	Kyoto	Maiden Race		1200m	12	2nd	1:14.0	Shigehiko Kishi	Nichido Thunder
Oct 29, 1989	2	Kyoto	Maiden Race		1600m	3	1st	1:36.3	Shigehiko Kishi	(Just a Hard)
Nov 11, 1989	2	Kyoto	Daily Hai Sansai Stakes	G3	1400m	2	4th	1:23.8	Shigehiko Kishi	Yamanin Global
Dec 9, 1989	2	Hanshin	Sazanka Sho	Pre-OP	1400m	2	1st	1:22.9	Yoshiyasu Tajima	(Daiichi Koya)
Dec 17, 1989	2	Hanshin	Hanshin Sansai Stakes	G1	1600m	5	2nd	1:35.7	Yutaka Take	Kogane Taifu
Jan 14, 1990	3	Kyoto	Shinzan Kinen	G3	1600m	11	2nd	1:36.1	Shigehiko Kishi	Nichido Thunder
Feb 11, 1990	3	Hanshin	Kisaragi Sho	G3	2000m	9	6th	2:05.2	Shigehiko Kishi	Haku Taisei
Mar 25, 1990	3	Nakayama	Spring Stakes	G2	1800m	3	11th	1:51.3	Shigehiko Kishi	Azuma East
Apr 14, 1990	3	Nakayama	Crystal Cup	G3	1200m	5	1st	1:09.0	Shigehiko Kishi	(Symboli Garuda)
May 13, 1990	3	Kyoto	Aoi Stakes	OP	1400m	18	1st	1:23.6	Shigehiko Kishi	(Daiichi Oishi)
Jun 3, 1990	3	Tokyo	New Zealand Trophy Yonsai Stakes	G2	1600m	9	2nd	1:35.1	Shigehiko Kishi	Music Time J.
Nov 18, 1990	3	Kyoto	Mile Championship	G1	1600m	16	17th	1:35.5	Yoshiyasu Tajima	Passing Shot
Dec 2, 1990	3	Chukyo	Sirius Stakes	OP	1200m	9	4th	1:10.3	Kiyoaki Ueno	Horino Winner
Dec 16, 1990	3	Nakayama	Sprinters Stakes	G1	1200m	10	5th	1:08.5	Shigehiko Kishi	Bamboo Memory
Feb 3, 1991	4	Kyoto	Yodo Tankyori Stakes	OP	1200m	11	4th	1:09.8	Shigehiko Kishi	Gloria Tosho
Feb 24, 1991	4	Chukyo	Yomiuri Milers Cup	G2	1700m	5	1st	1:41.2	Yutaka Take	(Pretty Hat)
Mar 17, 1991	4	Nakayama	Lord Derby Challenge Trophy	G3	1200m	6	4th	1:09.5	Shigehiko Kishi	Nice Power
Apr 21, 1991	4	Tokyo	Keio Hai Spring Cup	G2	1400m	1	6th	1:22.2	Shigehiko Kishi	Daiichi Ruby
May 12, 1991	4	Tokyo	Yasuda Kinen	G1	1600m	13	2nd	1:34.0	Shigehiko Kishi	Daiichi Ruby
Jun 23, 1991	4	Chukyo	CBC Sho	G2	1200m	9	5th	1:11.4	Shigehiko Kishi	Fame of Lass
Jul 7, 1991	4	Chukyo	Takamatsunomiya Hai	G2	2000m	1	1st	1:59.4	Tadashi Kayo	(Daiichi Ruby)
Oct 6, 1991	4	Tokyo	Mainichi Ōkan	G2	1800m	13	2nd	1:46.2	Shigehiko Kishi	Prekrasnie
Oct 26, 1991	4	Kyoto	Swan Stakes	G2	1400m	1	9th	1:21.6	Shigehiko Kishi	K.S. Miracle
Nov 17, 1991	4	Kyoto	Mile Championship	G1	1600m	12	1st	1:34.8	Shigehiko Kishi	(Daiichi Ruby)
Dec 22, 1991	4	Nakayama	Arima Kinen	G1	2500m	4	5th	2:31.3	Shigehiko Kishi	Dai Yusaku
Mar 1, 1992	5	Hanshin	Yomiuri Milers Cup	G2	1600m	4	1st	1:36.2	Shigehiko Kishi	(Shin Horisky)
Apr 25, 1992	5	Tokyo	Keio Hai Spring Cup	G2	1400m	6	4th	1:22.0	Shigehiko Kishi	Dynamite Daddy
May 17, 1992	5	Tokyo	Yasuda Kinen	G1	1600m	5	6th	1:34.2	Shigehiko Kishi	Yamanin Zephyr
Jun 14, 1992	5	Hanshin	Takarazuka Kinen	G1	2200m	3	5th	2:20.6	Shigehiko Kishi	Mejiro Palmer
Oct 11, 1992	5	Tokyo	Mainichi Ōkan	G2	1800m	1	1st	1:45.6	Shigehiko Kishi	(Ikuno Dictus)
Nov 1, 1992	5	Tokyo	Tennō Shō (Autumn)	G1	2000m	6	8th	1:59.2	Shigehiko Kishi	Let's Go Tarquin
Nov 22, 1992	5	Kyoto	Mile Championship	G1	1600m	18	1st	1:33.3	Shigehiko Kishi	(Shinko Lovely)
Dec 20, 1992	5	Nakayama	Sprinters Stakes	G1	1200m	12	4th	1:08.1	Shigehiko Kishi	Nishino Flower
Dec 27, 1992	5	Nakayama	Arima Kinen	G1	2500m	8	12th	2:34.8	Shigehiko Kishi	Mejiro Palmer

== Pedigree ==
Pedigree of Daitaku Helios
Sire Bizen Nishiki (JPN)	Dandy Lute (FR)	Luthier (FR)	Klairon (FR)
Sire Bizen Nishiki (JPN)	Dandy Lute (FR)	Luthier (FR)	Flute Enchantee (FR)
Sire Bizen Nishiki (JPN)	Dandy Lute (FR)	Dentrelic (FR)	Prudent (USA)
Sire Bizen Nishiki (JPN)	Dandy Lute (FR)	Dentrelic (FR)	Relict (GB)
Sire Bizen Nishiki (JPN)	Benibana Bizen (JPN)	Minsky (CAN)	Northern Dancer (CAN)
Sire Bizen Nishiki (JPN)	Benibana Bizen (JPN)	Minsky (CAN)	Flaming Page (CAN)
Sire Bizen Nishiki (JPN)	Benibana Bizen (JPN)	Katsu Hagoromo (JPN)	Sound Track (IRE)
Sire Bizen Nishiki (JPN)	Benibana Bizen (JPN)	Katsu Hagoromo (JPN)	Wildlife (GB)
Dam Never Ichiban (JPN)	Never Beat (GB)	Never Say Die (USA)	Nasrullah (GB)
Dam Never Ichiban (JPN)	Never Beat (GB)	Never Say Die (USA)	Singing Grass (USA)
Dam Never Ichiban (JPN)	Never Beat (GB)	Bride Elect (GB)	Big Game (GB)
Dam Never Ichiban (JPN)	Never Beat (GB)	Bride Elect (GB)	Netherton Maid (GB)
Dam Never Ichiban (JPN)	Miss Nanba Ichiban (JPN)	Harroway (GB)	Fairway (GB)
Dam Never Ichiban (JPN)	Miss Nanba Ichiban (JPN)	Harroway (GB)	Rosy Legend (FR)
Dam Never Ichiban (JPN)	Miss Nanba Ichiban (JPN)	Style Patch (USA)	Dogpatch (USA)
Dam Never Ichiban (JPN)	Miss Nanba Ichiban (JPN)	Style Patch (USA)	Style Leader (USA) (Family: 8-g)
