= Bizen Nishiki =

Japanese-bred Thoroughbred racehorse

Bizen Nishiki ビゼンニシキ
- Breed: Thoroughbred
- Sire: Dandy Lute
- Grandsire: Luthier
- Dam: Benibana Bizen
- Damsire: Minsky
- Sex: Stallion
- Foaled: April 26, 1981
- Died: July 23, 1999 (aged 18)
- Country: Japan (Yokohama, Aomori)
- Colour: Chestnut
- Breeder: Meisei Bokujo
- Owner: Shozo Fujita
- Racing colours
- Trainer: Akimitsu Narumiya (Miho)
- Jockey: Seiji Ebisawa; Yukio Okabe
- Record: 10: 6–2–0
- Earnings: 145,017,400 yen

Major wins
- NHK Hai (1984) (GII); Spring Stakes (1984) (GII); Kyodo Tsushin Hai Yonsai Stakes (1984) (GIII)

Bizen Nishiki (Japanese: ビゼンニシキ, Hepburn: Bizen Nishiki; April 26, 1981 – July 23, 1999) was a Japanese thoroughbred racehorse and stud horse who was called the rival of Symboli Rudolf during the Japanese Classic Races of 1984.

== Background ==
Bizen Nishiki's dam, Benibana Bizen, was foaled by Minsky in 1975. After entering Akimitsu Narumiya's stable at Miho Training Center and debuting, she won consecutive victories and was the favorite in the polls even in open races. She also contested the Yushun Himba. She achieved a record of 4 wins in 24 races before becoming a broodmare at Meisei Bokujo in Aomori, a farm operated by Narumiya. There, Narumiya himself planned for her to be mated with Dandy Lute, and she foaled a chestnut colt on April 26, 1981, who would later be named Bizen Nishiki.

Not much attention was paid to the horse, as he took a little while to physically develop. However, he avoided illnesses and grew to have a solid build by the time he was two, inheriting his large frame from his dam.

== Racing career ==
=== 1983: two-year-old season ===
Mating at breeding grounds in 1980 was later than most years because of an outbreak of contagious metritis. Thus, the 1981-born generation had their debuts later than usual, and it was expected that even after their two-year-old races began in 1983, talented horses would only appear later. Early successes were won by Sakura Toko and Hardy Vision from the Kanto area as well as Long Hayabusa from the Kansai area. "Free Handicap," a JRA PR brochure published by the magazine Yushun, rated those three as "the three strongest three-year-olds." (Note: Prior to Japan's revision of the way it counts horse ages to match the international standard in 2001, newborns used to be considered 1 year old.) The then-undefeated Symboli Rudolf, while yet to win a graded race, was considered the next best due to the manner in which he'd won his three races. He wasn't evaluated more highly at the time because his team had been choosing "easy" races they knew he could win.

Bizen Nishiki made his debut in November 1983 over 1400 meters on turf at Tokyo Racecourse with Yukio Okabe at the reins. He surged from behind during the final straight and won by six lengths. Three weeks later, he contested the Sazanka Sho, a condition race over the same distance. There, he surged from behind again, achieving a time 2.1 seconds faster than his maiden race to win his second consecutive victory. He then ran the Hiiragi Sho at the end of the year, where he was number-one in the polls. Once again, he surged from behind to take his third consecutive win.

While the "All-Japan Free Handicap," published in Keiba Book, rated Bizen Nishiki as a serious contender just above Symboli Rudolf—giving him a 1kg advantage—it noted that Bizen's distance aptitude may cause problems for the following year's Tōkyō Yūshun (Japanese Derby), an idea they echoed with Symboli Rudolf himself.

=== 1984: three-year-old season ===
Bizen Nishiki's first race of his three-year-old season was the Kyodo Tsushin Hai Yonsai Stakes in mid-February. Some of the best horses of the generation, such as Hardy Vision—who had won the Asahi Hai Sansai Stakes—were absent, and Bizen won this race by a length, achieving his first graded win. Okabe commented that "It was so easy. He grows with every race. He has a lot of potential."

Three weeks later, he contested the Yayoi Sho, a race over the same distance and on the same track as the Satsuki Shō, one of the Triple Crown races. Saying "Please assume the one I chose is stronger," Okabe—who had jockeyed Bizen until now—instead chose to jockey the undefeated Symboli Rudolf for the race; it was his first race of the year. Bizen Nishiki's team was furious, and jockey Seiji Ebisawa, a member of Narumiya's stable, rode the colt instead. Bizen Nishiki was number-one in the polls; this was the only time in Symboli Rudolf's racing career where he wasn't considered the favorite.

Bizen Nishiki had a late start out the gate, and as he took a position on the outside of the rear pack, Symboli Rudolf ran further ahead in fourth or fifth place. On the final corner, Symboli Rudolf broke out of the pack, and Bizen Nishiki gave chase. On the last straight there was a minor accident as Bizen Nishiki moved obliquely, his front-right leg making contact with Symboli Rudolf's left hind leg, but Rudolf didn't lose speed, ultimately defeating Bizen by 1 and 3/4 lengths and ending his undefeated streak.

At the Spring Stakes, Bizen Nishiki ran away with a surprise victory over Sakura Toko, and the NHK Cup ended in an easy victory. However, he lost the Satsuki Shō, once again taking 2nd to Symboli Rudolf, but some cited Rudolf striking Bizen during the race as a reason Bizen lost.

In All-Japan Free Handicap, critic Kōichi Yamada said that "in foreign horse racing, cases like these lead to standings changes," but also that even without the contact, Bizen Nishiki probably wouldn't have been able to beat Symboli Rudolf. After this race, the JRA made it clear that they'd begun to consider the introduction of a demotion system.

After losing badly at the Tōkyō Yūshun (Japanese Derby), worries about Bizen Nishiki's distance aptitude once again came to the forefront. The team opted for a short-distance circuit for the remainder of the year instead, and rather than the long-distance Kikuka-sho—the third of the Triple Crown races—Bizen Nishiki would instead contest the short-distance Swan Stakes. The horse had an accident during the race, however, which forced him into retirement.

== Racing statistics ==
The following form is based on information from netkeiba.

Date	Track	Name	Grade	Distance	Field	Odds (Favored)	Finish	Time	Margin	Jockey	Winner (2nd Place)
1983 – two-year-old season
Nov 5	Tokyo	3yo Newcomer	Maiden	Turf 1400m	8	11.3 (3rd)	1st	1:26.4	-1.0	Yukio Okabe	(Flower Park)
Nov 27	Tokyo	Sazanka Sho		Turf 1400m	11	5.0 (2nd)	1st	1:24.3	-0.5	Yukio Okabe	(Nippo Swallow)
Dec 24	Nakayama	Hiiragi Sho		Turf 1800m	9	1.8 (1st)	1st	1:51.8	-0.3	Yukio Okabe	(Hakuba Tenryu)
1984 – three-year-old season
Feb 12	Tokyo	Kyodo Tsushin Hai Yonsai Stakes	GIII	Turf 1800m	8	1.8 (1st)	1st	1:51.6	-0.2	Yukio Okabe	(Rikisan Power)
Mar 4	Nakayama	Yayoi Sho	GIII	Turf 2000m	14	2.5 (1st)	2nd	2:02.0	0.3	Seiji Ebisawa	Symboli Rudolf
Mar 25	Nakayama	Spring Stakes (Japan)	GIII	Turf 1800m	13	1.9 (1st)	1st	1:50.6	-0.1	Seiji Ebisawa	(Sakura Toko)
Apr 15	Nakayama	Satsuki Shō	GI	Turf 2000m	19	5.0 (2nd)	2nd	2:01.3	0.2	Seiji Ebisawa	Symboli Rudolf
May 6	Tokyo	NHK Hai	GII	Turf 2000m	9	1.5 (1st)	1st	2:04.0	-0.4	Seiji Ebisawa	(Toho Kamuri)
May 27	Tokyo	Tōkyō Yūshun	GI	Turf 2400m	21	6.7 (2nd)	14th	2:32.0	2.7	Seiji Ebisawa	Symboli Rudolf
Oct 28	Kyoto	Swan Stakes	OP	Turf 1400m	14	8.7 (3rd)	12th	1:27.8	6.4	Seiji Ebisawa	Nihon Pillow Winner

== Stud career ==
After the horse was retired, the Syndicate Bizen Nishiki Association was formed, and in 1985 he was made a stud horse at Urakawa Stallion Center (now East Stud). Since his sire, Dandy Lute, and his damsire, Minsky, were both successful stud horses but died early, many hoped for Bizen Nishiki to be the one to carry on Dandy Lute's line. He mated with 49 broodmares during his first year and at least 50 every year after that until 1996.

Four of his progeny born in 1987 went on to win graded races: Daitaku Helios, Hashino Kenshiro, Passing Lute, and Bizen Tsukasa, putting Bizen Nishiki at 4th most successful sire of his generation. He was moved to Tahara Farm in Kagoshima to spend his later years, eventually passing on July 23, 1999 from complications that arose when he fell and hit his head during a teasing.

== Legacy ==
In 1984, Symboli Rudolf would go on to be the first undefeated Triple Crown winner in Japanese racing history and have a strong showing at the Japan Cup. His exploits led to an elevation of Bizen Nishiki in some people's eyes; they considered him the horse that gave Rudolf the most trouble. Until the Japanese Derby, he hadn't lost to anyone except Symboli Rudolf, leading to his being considered Rudolf's rival, though critics noted "after losing so one-sidedly, it's dubious if you can actually call him a rival."

"Free Handicap" gave Bizen Nishiki a rating of 60 kg that year, placing him second in his generation. All-Japan Free Handicap rated him at 63 kg, which would have been equal to Classic race winners in most other years.

== Pedigree ==
Pedigree of Bizen Nishiki (JPN), chestnut colt, 1981
Sire Dandy Lute	Luthier	Klairon	Clarion
Sire Dandy Lute	Luthier	Klairon	Kalmia
Sire Dandy Lute	Luthier	Flute Enchantee	Cranach
Sire Dandy Lute	Luthier	Flute Enchantee	Montagnana
Sire Dandy Lute	Dentrelic	Prudent	My Babu
Sire Dandy Lute	Dentrelic	Prudent	Providence
Sire Dandy Lute	Dentrelic	Relict	Relic
Sire Dandy Lute	Dentrelic	Relict	Fakhry
Dam Benibana Bizen	Minsky	Northern Dancer	Nearctic
Dam Benibana Bizen	Minsky	Northern Dancer	Natalma
Dam Benibana Bizen	Minsky	Flaming Page	Bull Page
Dam Benibana Bizen	Minsky	Flaming Page	Flaring Top
Dam Benibana Bizen	Katsu Hagoromo	Sound Track	Whistler
Dam Benibana Bizen	Katsu Hagoromo	Sound Track	Bridle Way
Dam Benibana Bizen	Katsu Hagoromo	Wild Life	Big Game
Dam Benibana Bizen	Katsu Hagoromo	Wild Life	Clarinda

- Bizen Nishiki was inbred 5x5 to Djebel, who appears twice in the fifth generation of his pedigree.
