= Mejiro Palmer =

Japanese-bred Thoroughbred racehorse

Mejiro Palmer メジロパーマー
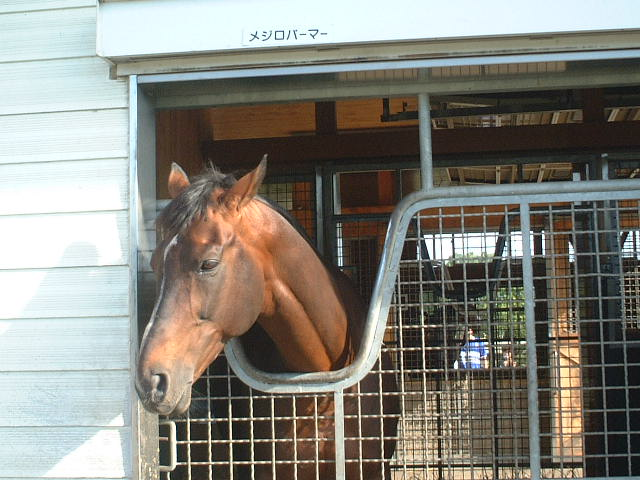
- Mejiro Palmer in 2002.
- Breed: Thoroughbred
- Sire: Mejiro Eagle
- Grandsire: Mejiro Samman
- Dam: Mejiro Fantasy
- Damsire: Gay Mecene
- Sex: Stallion
- Foaled: March 21, 1987
- Died: April 7, 2012 (aged 25)
- Country: Japan
- Colour: Bay
- Breeder: Mejiro Stud
- Owner: Mejiro Stud
- Racing colours
- Trainer: Masaaki Okubo
- Jockey: Taisei Yamada
- Record: 38: 9-5-2
- Earnings: ¥536,742,200

Major wins
- Sapporo Kinen (1991); Niigata Daishoten (1992); Takarazuka Kinen (1992); Arima Kinen (1992); Hanshin Daishoten (1993)

Awards
- JRA Award for Best Older Male Horse (1992); JRA Award for Best Home-Bred Sire (1992)

Mejiro Palmer (Japanese: メジロパーマー, Hepburn: Mejiro Pāmā; March 21, 1987 – April 7, 2012) was a Japanese Thoroughbred racehorse and sire. He was known as the fifth horse in history to win both grand prix races, the Takarazuka Kinen and Arima Kinen in the same season (1992). He was also known as the first Japanese horse to win a G1 race after switching back from steeplechase races to flat races. Together with Mejiro Ryan and Mejiro McQueen, who were born in 1987 (Showa 62), they were known as the flower class of 62 (花の62年組).

== Background ==
Mejiro Palmer was foaled out of Mejiro Fantasy, who won one race out of four starts. Mejiro Fantasy's dam, Princess Lyphard, was a full sister to the sire Mogami, so she was expected to have good bloodlines. His sire, Mejiro Eagle, won seven races in 19 starts, with his major win coming in the 1978 Kyoto Shimbun Hai. He also finished in third place behind Inter Gushiken in the 1978 Kikuka Sho. All of Mejiro Eagles' victories came in his trademark runaway front-running style, a trait inherited by Mejiro Palmer.

His name came from the crown name of Mejiro Stud - Mejiro and Arnold Palmer, an American golfer.

== Racing career ==
=== 1989–1991: two to four-year-old seasons ===
Mejiro Palmer made his debut on August 12, 1989, at Hakodate Racecourse. He finished the race in second place six lengths behind the winner, Zogebune Megami. He then finished in second again in his second start before winning his third maiden race attempt. He maintained his winning form at the Cosmos Sho before losing in the next two races. Unfortunately, he suffered a fracture in his left hind leg after the race and was placed on a recovery break of more than six months. When he made his comeback in the next season, he was placed in a semi-open class due to lack of prize money won. Following his return in June 1990, he went on a losing streak of 11 straight races. During that time, he competed in two graded races, the Hakodate Kinen in which he finished seventh and the 1991 Tenno Sho (Spring) where he finished down in thirteenth-place.

Mejiro Palmer's performances would eventually improve, as he snatched a win in the Tokachidake Tokubetsu on June 22, 1991. Riding this momentum, he entered the Sapporo Kinen (GIII), as the fourth favourite with a light 51kg handicap. Despite getting a slow start, he took the lead on the second corner and led the pack alone. He then held off G1 regulars such as Mogami Champion and Kamino Cresse, who chased him hard on the final straight to finish the race in first. This marked his first graded race victory in the summer of his fifth year. Then, his form slumped again as he failed to run well in the next three races, including a dismal last-place finish in the 1991 Kyoto Daishoten. This poor streak of losses prompted his trainer to switch him to steeplechase races. He passed the test for the switching program in a record time. This switch initially worked, and Mejiro Palmer won his maiden steeplechase race and placed second in the next race. At the end of the second race, his trainer Okubo felt that Mejiro Palmer was jumping too low to clear the hurdles, and began to doubt the switch to steeplechase. Upon inspection, Mejiro Palmer's legs were swollen, and there were abrasions from contact with the hurdles. Despite the good results, Okubo cancelled the plan for Mejiro Palmer to became a steeplechase horse and readjusted him to flat races after a period of rest.

=== 1992: five-year-old season ===
Mejiro Palmer started his five-year-old season in the Coral Stakes on March 29, where he ended up in fourth-place. In his next race, Mejiro Palmer was paired for the first time with 21-year-old Taisei Yamada, who would become Mejiro Palmer's regular jockey. At the Tenno Sho (Spring), Mejiro Palmer performed his trademark runaway style and surged to an early lead, but ran out of steam towards the end of the race and finished in seventh-place behind Mejiro McQueen. On May 17, he ran in the Niigata Daishoten. He took the lead from the start, held off the pack, stretched his legs in the straight, and won by four lengths to claim his second graded race win. Okubo was encouraged by this result and registered him for the Takarazuka Kinen, as his win in the Niigata Daishoten earned him a starting gate despite not qualifying for entry via the public vote.

The 1992 Takarazuka Kinen was supposed to be the battleground between Tokai Teio and Mejiro McQueen, but both did not participate due to injuries. As a result, entries for this Takarazuka Kinen was thin as there were only 2 G1 winners present in the field; Daiyusaku (1991 Arima Kinen winner) and Daitaku Helios (1991 Mile Championship winner). Mejiro Palmer sat at ninth favourite whilst the major favourite for the race was Kamino Cresse. Starting from the second outermost gate 12, Mejiro Palmer surged to the front, challenging Daitaku Helios, who was trying to take the lead from the inside. Daitaku Helios did not push too hard, and Mejiro Palmer was able to break away alone. In the second half of the race, Daitaku Helios and Kamino Cresse led the chase of the runaway leader but were unable to close the gap that Mejiro Palmer had built up. Instead, Mr. Spain overtook the flagging Daitaku Helios late in the race to move into third, and although Mejiro Palmer was beginning to lose pace as he entered the final straight, he held on to win his first G1 race by three lengths over Kamino Cresse. After the race, Yamada stated that the horse was already losing momentum at the third corner and fading after the fourth, but he never looked back and kept on going for the win.

He was rested at the Mejiro Stud the whole summer and started his autumn campaign in the Kyoto Daishoten. Although Yamada was injured from falling the day before the race, he nevertheless opted to ride Mejiro Palmer. As usual, Mejiro Palmer broke early for the lead but got caught by the pack on the final corner and finished in ninth. He then entered the Autumn Tenno Sho, with Shinji Fujita replacing Yamada, who had not fully healed from his fall in Kyoto. In this race, he was in a battle with Daitaku Helios from the start. Although he ran the first 1000 meters at a high pace of 57.5 seconds, he lost momentum on the home straight and fell back to 17th place. After those poor performances, Okubo opted for Mejiro Palmer to skip the Japan Cup and instead prepare for the Arima Kinen. In the voting list, Mejiro Palmer was not qualified for the race, but as he was the reigning Takarazuka Kinen winner, he was offered a slot and accepted it. Yamada would come back for the reins on race day.

Unlike in the Takarazuka Kinen, the field for the 1992 Arima Kinen was full of great horses. With the likes of Tokai Teio, Rice Shower, Nice Nature, Hishi Masaru, Legacy World, White Stone, Leo Durban, Let's Go Tarquin and Daitaku Helios joining in, Mejiro Palmer started 15th favourite at 49.4 odds. The strength of the field did not faze Yamada and Mejiro Palmer as they boldly took the lead, whilst Daitaku Helios was held back by his jockey and dropped to second place. These two horses would challenge each other and together built up a lead that grew to 15 lengths over the other competitors. As the two runaways entered the third corner together, the rest of the pack began to give chase. Mejiro Palmer would overtake the wavering Daitaku Helios for the lead and ran as fast as he could to the line as the rest of the field swallowed Daitaku Helios and began to catch up. Legacy World surged from the back pack and almost caught Mejiro Palmer on the line, but he held on to win by a nose margin. With this win, Mejiro Palmer snatched both grand prix races and became the fifth horse since Inari One in the 1989 season to win both grand prix races in the same year. Yamada would reminisce after the win, saying that: "Even when Daitaku Helios came at me on the home stretch, I was able to release the bit myself and maintain the horse's pace without getting caught. Palmer held on well until the end. He really did his best."

Mejiro Palmer won three races out of seven starts in 1992. He was awarded the JRA Award for Best Older Male Horse and for best home-bred sire. He was also the runner-up to Mihono Bourbon for the Japanese Horse of the Year award.

=== 1993–1994: six to seven-year-old seasons ===
At the beginning of the 1993 season, Mejiro Palmer ran in the Hanshin Daishoten. As the race started, he asserted his lead and made a solo breakaway. The horses behind him closed in on him in the third corner of the second lap. In the straight, he became locked in a close race with Takeno Velvet, Nice Nature, and others. Yamada waited for the horses behind to close in before ordering Mejiro Palmer to make a sprint. He overtook Takeno Velvet and Nice Nature and crossed the finish line by half a length. This would be the final win of his career.

In the upcoming Spring Tenno Sho, Mejiro Palmer ran away at the start like usual. In the third corner of the second lap, Rice Shower and Mejiro McQueen came alongside him on the uphill slope, but he was overtaken in the straight as he continued to hang onto the third position. Both of the horses battled it out to the line, while Mejiro Palmer finished in third behind those two. For the rest of the year, he competed in five graded races and finished outside of the podium in all of them. He began showing signs of a return to form at the beginning of the 1994 season when he placed second in the Nikkei Shinshun Hai, two lengths behind Monsieur Siecle. However, he was diagnosed with flexor tendonitis in his left foreleg after the race. This injury eventually led to his retirement due to his age. He was retired and deregistered from racing on September 22, 1994.

== Stud record and death ==
Mejiro Palmer started his stud duty at Arrow Stud in Hokkaido. He retired as a stud in 2002 and moved back to the Mejiro Farm (later renamed Lake Villa Farm in 2011). Overall, he bred with 102 mares and produced 62 foals from 1995 until 2002. His best progeny was Mejiro Raiden, who won the JG2 race, Kyoto High Jump.

On April 7, 2012, Mejiro Palmer died due to sudden heart attack.

== In popular culture ==
An anthropomorphized version of Mejiro Palmer appears as a character in the Japanese multimedia franchise Umamusume: Pretty Derby, voiced by Yuri Noguchi. While friendly and popular among the student body in addition to being a member of the storied Mejiro family, Palmer tends to get overlooked and unappreciated in comparison to champions such as Mejiro McQueen, and as such developed a deep-seated inferiority complex towards her family. She is best friends with Daitaku Helios, with whom she develops a more extreme variant of the front-running race strategy called the "runaway" style. Palmer also adopts Helios' gyaru behavior and slang (localized as zoomer slang in the global release of the mobile game), though she occasionally needs clarification with the latter. References to her real-life namesake Arnold Palmer can be found in her racing outfit motif, and her non-racing hobby of playing golf.

== Racing form ==
Mejiro Palmer won nine races out of 38 starts (36 flats, 2 steeplechase). This data is available in JBIS and netkeiba.

Date	Age	Track	Name	Grade	Distance (Condition)	Field	Finished	Time	Jockey	Winner (2nd Place)
Aug 12, 1989	2	Hakodate	2YO debut		1000m (Firm)	7	2nd	1:00.1	Masato Shibata	Zogebune Megami
Aug 26, 1989	2	Hakodate	2YO debut		1000m (Firm)	7	2nd	0:59.2	Masato Shibata	Golden Stella
Sep 9, 1989	2	Hakodate	2YO maiden		1200m (Soft)	9	1st	1:13.6	Hiroshi Tamogi	(Pot Mitsuru Boy)
Sep 23, 1989	2	Hakodate	Cosmos Sho	OP	1700m (Soft)	7	1st	1:47.7	Hiroshi Tamogi	(King of Track)
Oct 14, 1989	2	Kyoto	Hagi Stakes	OP	1200m (Firm)	9	9th	1:11.9	Yoshiyuki Muramoto	Heisei Tomi O
Nov 25, 1989	2	Kyoto	Kyoto Sansai Stakes	OP	1600m (Firm)	10	8th	1:38.2	Yoshiyasu Tajima	Nichido Thunder
Jun 17, 1990	3	Sapporo	Elm Stakes		1800m (Firm)	6	5th	1:51.7	Hiroshi Kawachi	Uto Time
Jul 8, 1990	3	Sapporo	Hochi Hai Daisetsu Handicap		1700m (Fast)	6	6th	1:45.1	Mikio Matsunaga	Shin Noble
Jul 22, 1990	3	Sapporo	Doshin Hai	OP	1800m (Firm)	11	5th	1:49.9	Mikio Matsunaga	Uto Time
Aug 5, 1990	3	Hakodate	Tomoe Sho	OP	1800m (Firm)	9	8th	1:48.0	Mikio Matsunaga	Lucky Guerlain
Aug 19, 1990	3	Hakodate	Hakodate Kinen	G3	2000m (Firm)	15	7th	2:00.4	Mikio Matsunaga	Lucky Guerlain
Mar 2, 1991	4	Chukyo	Suzuka Stakes		1200m (Firm)	16	12th	1:10.8	Yoshiyuki Muramoto	Golden Rikka
Mar 24, 1991	4	Kyoto	Ohara Stakes		2400m (Good)	14	3rd	2:26.5	Koichi Tsunoda	Tai Eagle
Apr 6, 1991	4	Kyoto	Osaka Jo Stakes	OP	2400m (Firm)	12	4th	2:27.2	Yoshiyuki Muramoto	Erimo Passer
Apr 28, 1991	4	Kyoto	Tenno Sho (Spring)	G1	3200m (Firm)	18	13th	3:21.6	Yoshiyuki Muramoto	Mejiro McQueen
Jun 8, 1991	4	Sapporo	Niseko Tokubetsu	ALW (1W)	1800m (Firm)	14	2nd	1:48.7	Mikio Matsunaga	Super Shinzan
Jun 22, 1991	4	Sapporo	Tokachidake Tokubetsu	ALW (1W)	1800m (Firm)	6	1st	1:48.8	Mikio Matsunaga	(Largest)
Jun 30, 1991	4	Sapporo	Sapporo Kinen	G3	2000m (Firm)	16	1st	2:00.9	Mikio Matsunaga	(Mogami Champion)
Aug 4, 1991	4	Hakodate	Tomoe Sho	OP	1800m (Heavy)	14	6th	1:51.7	Mikio Matsunaga	Tsurumai Nus
Aug 18, 1991	4	Hakodate	Hakodate Kinen	G3	2000m (Firm)	14	5th	1:59.8	Mikio Matsunaga	Mejiro Marsyas
Oct 6, 1991	4	Kyoto	Kyoto Daishoten	G2	2400m (Firm)	7	7th	2:29.7	Koichi Tsunoda	Mejiro McQueen
Nov 2, 1991	4	Kyoto	3YO+ debut jump		3000m (Fast)	9	1st	3:24.5	Toshiro Oshida	(Calstone Parthia)
Dec 1, 1991	4	Hanshin	3YO+ allowance jump		3150m (Fast)	11	2nd	3:32.5	Toshiro Oshida	Ein Kaiser
Mar 29, 1992	5	Hanshin	Coral Stakes	OP	1400m (Soft)	13	4th	1:24.8	Takayuki Yasuda	Bamboo Passion
Apr 26, 1992	5	Kyoto	Tenno Sho (Spring)	G1	3200m (Firm)	14	7th	3:22.9	Taisei Yamada	Mejiro McQueen
May 17, 1992	5	Niigata	Niigata Daishoten	G3	2200m (Firm)	13	1st	2:13.4	Taisei Yamada	(Tanino Borero)
Jun 14, 1992	5	Hanshin	Takarazuka Kinen	G1	2200m (Firm)	13	1st	2:18.6	Taisei Yamada	(Kamino Cresse)
Oct 11, 1992	5	Kyoto	Kyoto Daishoten	G2	2400m (Firm)	14	9th	2:26.1	Taisei Yamada	Osumi Roch
Nov 1, 1992	5	Tokyo	Tenno Sho (Autumn)	G1	2000m (Firm)	18	17th	2:00.4	Shinji Fujita	Let's Go Tarquin
Dec 27, 1992	5	Nakayama	Arima Kinen	G1	2500m (Firm)	16	1st	2:33.5	Taisei Yamada	(Legacy World)
Mar 14, 1993	6	Hanshin	Hanshin Daishoten	G2	3000m (Firm)	11	1st	R3:09.2	Taisei Yamada	(Takeno Velvet)
Apr 25, 1993	6	Kyoto	Tenno Sho (Spring)	G1	3200m (Firm)	15	3rd	3:17.6	Taisei Yamada	Rice Shower
Jun 13, 1993	6	Hanshin	Takarazuka Kinen	G1	2200m (Firm)	11	10th	2:21.5	Taisei Yamada	Mejiro McQueen
Oct 10, 1993	6	Kyoto	Kyoto Daishoten	G2	2400m (Firm)	10	9th	2:25.7	Taisei Yamada	Mejiro McQueen
Oct 30, 1993	6	Kyoto	Swan Stakes	G2	1400m (Soft)	16	11th	1:22.7	Taisei Yamada	Shinko Lovely
Nov 28, 1993	6	Tokyo	Japan Cup	G1	2400m (Firm)	16	10th	2:25.4	Taisei Yamada	Legacy World
Dec 26, 1993	6	Nakayama	Arima Kinen	G1	2500m (Firm)	14	6th	2:31.9	Norihiro Yokoyama	Tokai Teio
Jan 23, 1994	7	Hanshin	Nikkei Shinshun Hai	G2	2500m (Firm)	16	2nd	2:35.8	Taisei Yamada	Monsieur Siecle

Legend:
Turf Dirt Steeplechase

- R indicated that it was a record time finish

== Pedigree ==
Pedigree of Mejiro Palmer
Sire Mejiro Eagle	Mejiro Samman	Charlottesville	Prince Chevalier
Sire Mejiro Eagle	Mejiro Samman	Charlottesville	Noorani
Sire Mejiro Eagle	Mejiro Samman	Paradisea	Aureole
Sire Mejiro Eagle	Mejiro Samman	Paradisea	Chenille
Sire Mejiro Eagle	Amazon Warrior	Khaled	Hyperion
Sire Mejiro Eagle	Amazon Warrior	Khaled	Eclair
Sire Mejiro Eagle	Amazon Warrior	War Betsy	War Relic
Sire Mejiro Eagle	Amazon Warrior	War Betsy	Betsy Ross
Dam Mejiro Fantasy	Gay Mecene	Vaguely Noble	Vienna
Dam Mejiro Fantasy	Gay Mecene	Vaguely Noble	Noble Lassie
Dam Mejiro Fantasy	Gay Mecene	Gay Missile	Sir Gaylord
Dam Mejiro Fantasy	Gay Mecene	Gay Missile	Missy Baba
Dam Mejiro Fantasy	Princess Lyphard	Lyphard	Northern Dancer
Dam Mejiro Fantasy	Princess Lyphard	Lyphard	Goofed
Dam Mejiro Fantasy	Princess Lyphard	No Luck	Lucky Debonair
Dam Mejiro Fantasy	Princess Lyphard	No Luck	No Teasing (Family 1-x)

- Mejiro Palmer was inbred by 5 x 4 to Hyperion (Aureole's sire), 4 x 5 to Aureole (Vienna's sire) and 5 x 5 to Nearco (Noorani's and Noble Lassie's sire)
