= Bizen =

Bizen may refer to:

- Bizen, Okayama, a city located in the Chūgoku region of western Honshu, the largest island of Japan.
- Bizen Province, an old province of Japan on the Inland Sea side of Honshu
- Bizen ware, a type of Japanese pottery
- Debre Bizen, a monastery of the Eritrean Orthodox Tewahdo Church
- Bizen Nishiki, a Japanese Thoroughbred racehorse
