= Daiichi Ruby =

Japanese Thoroughbred racehorse

Daiichi Ruby ダイイチルビー
- Daiichi Ruby at the 1991 Sprinters Stakes.
- Breed: Thoroughbred
- Sire: Tosho Boy
- Grandsire: Tesco Boy
- Dam: Hagino Top Lady
- Damsire: Sancy
- Sex: Mare
- Foaled: April 15, 1987
- Died: April 26, 2007 (aged 20)
- Country: Japan
- Colour: Dark Bay
- Breeder: Ogifushi Bokujo
- Owner: Haruo Tsujimoto
- Racing colours
- Trainer: Yuji Ito
- Jockey: Hiroshi Kawachi
- Record: 18: 6-6-1
- Earnings: ¥431,711,600

Major wins
- Yasuda Kinen (1991); Sprinters Stakes (1991); Keio Hai Spring Cup (1991)

Awards
- JRA Award for Best Older Filly or Mare (1991); JRA Award for Best Sprinter or Miler (1991)

Daiichi Ruby (Japanese: ダイイチルビー, Hepburn: Daiichi Rubī; April 15, 1987 – April 26, 2007) was a Japanese Thoroughbred racehorse and broodmare. In 1991, she won both the Yasuda Kinen and the Sprinters Stakes, both G1 graded races. That same year, she would be awarded the JRA Award for Best Older Filly or Mare, and the JRA Award for Best Sprinter or Miler.

== Background ==
Owned by Haruo Tsujimoto, she was given the company's crown name "Daiichi". Horses owned by him in the mid 80s would often be given names based on gemstones, such as Diamond or Sapphire. Due to this, she was named "Ruby".

Her dam was Hagino Top Lady, a Double Tiara winner who won the 1980 Oka Shō and Queen Elizabeth II Cup. She was the granddaughter of Miss Marmichi, who was a descendant of British-bred Mairie, a renowned speedster and originator of the "Brilliant Family"; a line of successful mares brought to Japan shortly after the ban on the import of horses from foreign countries was lifted in the postwar period, having produced many G1 winners and award recipients. Daiichi Ruby's sire was Tosho Boy, a successful racehorse also known for his speed, and a winner of the Arima Kinen. The pairing of these top-class speed horses was described as a "dream cross," contributing to Daiichi Ruby's unprecedented selling price of 100 million yen.

== Racing career ==
=== 1990: four-year-old season ===
Daiichi Ruby made her debut on February 25, 1990, at Hanshin Racecourse, ridden by Yutaka Take, the previous year's leading jockey. Due to her strong pedigree, she was voted the favorite. She took the lead from the start without being threatened, winning her first race by five lengths. This performance put the G1-rated Oka Shō within sight, and she was entered into consideration for the trial race, Fillies' Revue (at the time named the Hochi Hai 4‑Year‑Old Filly Special). However, due to the lottery system of the race, she was not selected to participate. She then ran in the Anemone Stakes on March 24, winning by two lengths for her second consecutive victory. As a two‑win horse, she was entered for consideration directly to the Oka Sho, but again she was excluded by the lottery, and could not run. She went on to run the Wasurenagusa Sho (OP) on April 8, a race sometimes called the "Consolation Race for the Oka Sho"; she finished second, two and a half lengths behind Towa Ruby.

Hoping to win the Yushun Himba (Japanese Oaks), Daiichi Ruby was sent to the Kantō region. On April 29, at the Tokyo Racecourse, she ran as the favorite in the trial race, the Sankei Sports Sho 4‑Year‑Old Filly Special (G2). She finished second by a neck, securing priority entry rights for the Oaks; there, she raced against Agnes Flora, the favorite, who was running undefeated and had won the Oka Sho. Despite being the second favorite, Daiichi Ruby placed 5th, more than six lengths behind the winner.

On September 1, she returned to the stable at Ritto. The hope was for her to take on the final leg of the Fillies' Triple Crown, the Queen Elizabeth II Cup. On October 21, she participated in the trial race in the Rose Stakes, where she placed 5th. Her performance earned priority entry rights for the Queen Elizabeth II Cup, however, she developed Phlegmon on her right hind leg. Her trainer, Yuji Itō, withdrew her from the race, and she was given the rest of the year off.

=== 1991: five-year-old season ===
With the new year, Daiichi Ruby began her campaign on January 7 in the Rakuyo Stakes (OP). From this race onward, her jockey was changed to Hiroshi Kawachi, known as "Kawachi of the fillies." She had a slow start, but managed to finish second by half a length. Next, on January 27, she participated on the Kyoto Himba Stakes. She was the third favorite, behind Main Caster (winner of the Hanshin Himba Tokubetsu) and Samantha Tosho (third in the Mile Championship). She broke well but was blocked; on the straight, she maneuvered along the inside, taking the lead, and crossing the line first. She then traveled to the Kanto region for the Nakayama Himba Stakes (G3); despite having been voted the favorite, she placed 3rd, one-and-a-quarter lengths behind front-running Yukino Sunrise.

On April 21, again traveling to Kanto, she contested the Keio Hai Spring Cup (G2); her first racing against top‑class colts and older males, including Daitaku Helios. She was the third favorite, behind Bamboo Memory (a two‑time G1 winner) and Sakura Hokuto O (winner of the Asahi Hai Sansai Stakes). Daiichi Ruby crossed the line first, beating Yukino Sunrise by one length and-three-quarters, earning her second stakes victory.

==== Yasuda Kinen ====
External Video Link
- 1991 Yasuda Kinen; Race video from the JRA official YouTube channel

On May 12, Daiichi Ruby contested the Yasuda Kinen (G1). Since the introduction of the graded stakes system, no filly or mare had ever won the race, yet she was voted as the second favorite. The favorite was Bamboo Memory, who had already ran the race twice before, and won it in 1989.

Breaking from gate 4 in the second stall, Daiichi Ruby started slightly behind the others and raced at the rear. Bamboo Memory was alongside her for a time, racing in parallel, but gradually Bamboo Memory moved forward to sit three or four lengths ahead. Up front, Symboli Galluda had won the early battle for the lead and set the pace; the first 1000 meters were covered in 57.6 seconds, a scenario that favored end of the pack runners such as Daiichi Ruby and Bamboo Memory. Approaching the final turn, the front‑running horses began to tire out, allowing the 10th favorite, Daitaku Helios, racing just off the pace on the outside, to move to the front. The two still‑lagging favorites each chose a path: Bamboo Memory angled to the inside, while Daiichi Ruby swung wide to the outside, and both set off after Daitaku Helios. Bamboo Memory struggled to find a clear path on the inside, whereas Daiichi Ruby ran clear with her full power far outside. She passed Daitaku Helios almost immediately, reaching the finish line first. She won by 1 and a forth lengths.

Kawachi commented, "I had intended to go forward if our start was strong, but since I was slow out of the gate, we ended up racing from the back of the field [...] Given the stalemate, I decided not to force the issue [...] I considered making my move alongside Bamboo Memory, when he went, but to save her [Ruby's] energy, I chose to wait patiently until the fourth corner [...] In the end, she stretched out and finished very strongly."

==== Continuation of her five-year-old season ====
After her victory in the Yasuda Kinen, Daiichi Ruby was signed on to the Takamatsunomiya Kinen (a G2 at the time). Although her trainers had originally decided to not race her over 2000m the Takamatsunomiya Kinen was a had special weight in the eyes of her owner, Tsujimoto, as it had been won not only by Ruby's sire Tosho Boy, but also by her dam, Hagino Top Lady, and her granddamn. The prospect of three generations of mares winning the same graded race would bring more attention and higher earnings. She raced as the favorite, resulting was in a photo finish. In the end, the judges declared Daitaku Helios the winner by a nose.

On October 26, she was once again the favorite at the Swan Stakes. She nearly took the lead, but the fifth favorite, K.S. Miracle, came through on the inside and overtook her, winning by a neck. Next, on November 17, in her target race, the Mile Championship (G1), She again faced K. S. Miracle, Bamboo Memory, and Daitaku Helios. Breaking from gate 5 in the third stall, she broke slowly and immediately battled Bamboo Memory for a good position, which forced her to race from the rear; on the straight, she swung wide, but Daitaku Helios, who had had set a strong pace, and did not falter. Daiichi Ruby finished second, two and a half lengths behind Daitaku Helios.

==== Sprinters Stakes ====
External Video Link
- 1991 Sprinters Stakes; Race Footage Video from the Official JRA YouTube Channel

On December 15, Daiichi Ruby contested the Sprinters Stakes (G1). Bamboo Memory had been retired, and Daitaku Helios was aiming for the Arima Kinen, leaving the race to appear as a match between Daiichi Ruby and K.S. Miracle. Once again, Ruby started off slowly and raced at the back. The favorite, K.S. Miracle, was positioned prominently; on the final corner, he drew close and challenged for the lead, while Daiichi Ruby could not swing wide, as she was stuck in the middle of the pack. However, with 200 meters remaining, K.S. Miracle suffered an injury and fell behind; having lost her main rival, Daiichi Ruby then raced alone to the finish. She crossed the line first, four lengths ahead of Narcisse Noir. K.S. Miracle a had suffered comminuted fracture of the left first phalanx. He was immediately euthanized.

This was Daiichi Ruby's second G1 victory, making her the first filly or mare to win two G1 races against males.

=== 1992: six-year-old season ===
In 1992, the now six-year-old Daiichi Ruby remained in training, but she was now quite advanced in age for a racehorse. Her owners, recognizing her diminishing competitiveness, began to discuss the viability of breeding her with a strong stallion to produce high-quality offspring. Still, she participated in three races that year. Despite being the favorite in all 3, she placed off podium in all of them; she was retired shortly thereafter and was removed from the JRA racehorse register on May 27. One of her goals for the year had been to win the Takamatsunomiya Kinen, which would have made her a third-generation winner, but she retired before that opportunity.

== Broodmare career and death ==
After her retirement from racing, Daiichi Ruby became a broodmare at Daiichi Farm, established for her in Mitsuishi, Hokkaido. For a time, she was also boarded at the famous Northern Farm in Abira, Hokkaido. She foaled seven fillies and colts, often with very strong stallions such as Sunday Silence, but none had much success.

On April 26, 2007, she died at Daiichi Farm at the age of 20 due to Laminitis.

c = colt, f = filly, g = gelding

Foaled	Name	Sex	Sire	Major Wins
1994	Daiichi Cigar	f	Tony Bin	Shiragiku Sho
1996	Daiichi Vivid	f	Tony Bin	Rishiri Tokubetsu
1997	Daiichi Sunday	c	Sunday Silence	
1999	Iron Beauty	f	Brian's Time	
2000	Daiichi Silence	g	Sunday Silence	
2002	unnamed	c	El Condor Pasa	
2005	Captain Ruby	c	Kurofune	Hochi Hai Daisetsu Handicap

== In popular culture ==
An anthropomorphized version of Daiichi Ruby appears as a character in the Japanese multimedia franchise Umamusume: Pretty Derby, voiced by Karin Isobe. She is a stoic, aristocratic, and petite girl who behaves in a solemn, noble manner to live up to the expectations of her wealthy family. She is regularly the unwanted target of Daitaku Helios' affections, whose advances she repeatedly turns down but nonetheless continues to receive. A theatrical act featuring Daiichi Ruby, together with Daitaku Helios, K.S.Miracle, and Yamanin Zephyr, titled Umamusume: Pretty Derby The Stage -Sprinter's Story-, premiered in Japan in 2023.

== Racing form ==
Daiichi Ruby won six races out of 18 starts. This data is available on JBIS and netkeiba.

Date	Age	Race	Class	Distance	Racecourse	Finish	Entry	Time	Jockey	Winner (2nd Place)
February 25, 1990	4	Four-Year-Old Debut		Turf 1600	Hanshin	1st	8	1:37.9	Yutaka Take	(Hidaka Artemis)
March 24, 1990	4	Anemone Stakes	OP	Turf 1600	Hanshin	1st	10	1:36.6	Yutaka Take	(Makihata Glory)
April 4, 1990	4	Wasurenagusa Sho	OP	Turf 2000m	Hanshin	2nd	5	2:05.4	Yutaka Take	Towa Ruby
April 29, 1990	4	Flora Stakes	G2	Turf 2000m	Tokyo	2nd	13	2:01.5	Sueo Masuzawa	Kyoei Tap
May 20, 1990	4	Yushun Himba	G1	Turf 2400m	Tokyo	5th	4	2:27.1	Yutaka Take	Eishin Sunny
October 21, 1990	4	Rose Stakes	G2	Turf 2000m	Kyoto	5th	4	2:01.1	Yutaka Take	Katsuno Jo O
January 7, 1991	5	Rakuyo Stakes	OP	Turf 1600m	Kyoto	2nd	1	1:35.2	Hiroshi Kawachi	Pretty hat
January 27, 1991	5	Kyoto Himba Stakes	G3	Turf 1600m	Kyoto	1st	2	1:34.8	Hiroshi Kawachi	(Yusei Fairy)
February 24, 1991	5	Nakayama Himba Stakes	G3	Turf 1800m	Nakayama	3rd	7	1:47.9	Hiroshi Kawachi	Yukino Sunrise
April 21, 1991	5	Keio Hai Spring Cup	G2	Turf 1400m	Tokyo	1st	16	1:21.5	Hiroshi Kawachi	(Yukino Sunrise)
May 12, 1991	5	Yasuda Kinen	G1	Turf 1600m	Tokyo	1st	4	1:33.8	Hiroshi Kawachi	(Daitaku Helios)
July 7, 1991	5	Takamatsunomiya Hai	G2	Turf 2000m	Chukyo	2nd	8	1:59.4	Hiroshi Kawachi	Daitaku Helios
October 26, 1991	5	Swan Stakes	G2	Turf 1400m	Kyoto	2nd	12	1:20.6	Hiroshi Kawachi	K.S. Miracle
November 17, 1991	5	Mile Championship	G1	Turf 1600m	Kyoto	2nd	5	1:35.2	Hiroshi Kawachi	Daitaku Helios
December 15, 1991	5	Sprinters Stakes	G1	Turf 1200m	Chukyo	1st	12	1:07.6	Hiroshi Kawachi	(Narcisse Noir)
March 1, 1992	6	Yomiuri Milers Cup	G2	Turf 1600m	Hanshin	6th	6	1:37.6	Hiroshi Kawachi	Daitaku Helios
April 25, 1992	6	Keio Hai Spring Cup	G2	Turf 1400m	Tokyo	5th	10	1:22.1	Hiroshi Kawachi	Dynamite Daddy
May 17, 1992	6	Yasuda Kinen	G1	Turf 1600m	Tokyo	15th	15	1:35.4	Hiroshi Kawachi	Yamanin Zephyr

== Pedigree ==
Pedigree of Daiichi Ruby (JPN)
Sire Tosho Boy (JPN) 1973	Tesco Boy (GB); 1963	Princely Gift (GB)	Nasrullah (GB)
Sire Tosho Boy (JPN) 1973	Tesco Boy (GB); 1963	Princely Gift (GB)	Blue Gem (GB)
Sire Tosho Boy (JPN) 1973	Tesco Boy (GB); 1963	Suncourt (GB)	Hyperion (GB)
Sire Tosho Boy (JPN) 1973	Tesco Boy (GB); 1963	Suncourt (GB)	Inquisition (GB)
Sire Tosho Boy (JPN) 1973	Social Butterfly (USA); 1957	Your Host (USA)	Alibhai (GB)
Sire Tosho Boy (JPN) 1973	Social Butterfly (USA); 1957	Your Host (USA)	Boudoir (GB)
Sire Tosho Boy (JPN) 1973	Social Butterfly (USA); 1957	Wisteria (SA)	Easton (FR)
Sire Tosho Boy (JPN) 1973	Social Butterfly (USA); 1957	Wisteria (SA)	Blue Cyprus (USA)
Dam Hagino Top Lady (JPN) 1977	Sancy (FR); 1969	Sanctus (FR)	Fine Top (FR)
Dam Hagino Top Lady (JPN) 1977	Sancy (FR); 1969	Sanctus (FR)	Sanelta (FR)
Dam Hagino Top Lady (JPN) 1977	Sancy (FR); 1969	Wordys (FR)	Worden (FR)
Dam Hagino Top Lady (JPN) 1977	Sancy (FR); 1969	Wordys (FR)	Princess d'Ys (FR)
Dam Hagino Top Lady (JPN) 1977	Itto (JPN); 1971	Venture (GB)	Relic (USA)
Dam Hagino Top Lady (JPN) 1977	Itto (JPN); 1971	Venture (GB)	Rose o'Lynn (IRE)
Dam Hagino Top Lady (JPN) 1977	Itto (JPN); 1971	Miss Marumichi (JPN)	Never Beat (GB)
Dam Hagino Top Lady (JPN) 1977	Itto (JPN); 1971	Miss Marumichi (JPN)	Cupid (JPN)
