= Shinko Lovely =

Irish-bred, Japanese-trained Thoroughbred racehorse (1989–2011)

Shinko Lovely シンコウラブリイ
- Breed: Thoroughbred
- Sire: Caerleon
- Grandsire: Nijinsky
- Dam: Happy Trails
- Damsire: Posse
- Sex: Mare
- Foaled: 2 February 1989
- Died: 5 December 2011 (aged 22)
- Country: Japan
- Color: Bay
- Breeder: B. R. and Mrs Firestone
- Owner: Osamu Yasuda
- Racing colours
- Trainer: Kazuo Fujisawa
- Jockey: Yukio Okabe
- Record: 15: 10-2-2
- Earnings: ¥537,875,400

Major wins
- New Zealand Trophy (1992); Radio Tampa Sho (1992); Queen Stakes (1992); Mainichi Ōkan (1993); Swan Stakes (1993); Mile Championship (1993)

Awards
- JRA Best Older Filly or Mare (1993)

Shinko Lovely (シンコウラブリイ, Hepburn: Shinkō Raburii, 2 February 1989 – 5 December 2011) was an Irish-bred, Japanese-trained Thoroughbred racehorse who won the Mile Championship in 1993.

== Background ==
Shinko Lovely was born on February 2, 1989, in Ireland out of Happy Trails, an Irish-bred Mare. She was sired by Caerleon, the leading sire in Great Britain and Ireland in 1988 and 1991. Shinko Lovely was related to Nijinsky through Caerleon.

== Racing Record ==
Shinko Lovely had a total of 15 starts, 10 of which she won.

Date	Race	Grade	Distance	Surface	Condition	Track	Entry	Finish	Time	Margin	Jockey	Winner (Runner-up)
1991 – three-year-old season
Nov 2	3YO Debut		1600m	Turf	Firm	Tokyo	12	1st	1:35.5	-0.7	Hiroki Hashimoto	(Nike Knight)
Nov 16	Fukushima Sansai Stakes	OP	1200m	Turf	Firm	Fukushima	10	1st	1:00.9	-0.1	Katsumi Sakamoto	(Meiner Yamato)
Dec 1	Hanshin Sansai Himba Stakes	G1	1600m	Turf	Firm	Hanshin	15	3rd	1:36.4	0.2	Yukio Okabe	Nishino Flower
1992 – four-year-old season
May 23	Carnation Cup	OP	1600m	Turf	Firm	Tokyo	16	6th	1:36.0	0.5	Yukio Okabe	Talent Dancer
Jun 7	New Zealand Trophy	G2	1600m	Turf	Firm	Tokyo	10	1st	1:34.9	-0.2	Yukio Okabe	(Hishi Masaru)
Jul 5	Radio Tampa Sho	G3	1800m	Turf	Firm	Fukushima	9	1st	1:48.6	-0.4	Katsumi Sakamoto	(Pot Richard)
Oct 4	Queen Stakes	G3	2000m	Turf	Firm	Nakayama	15	1st	2:00.7	-0.6	Yukio Okabe	(Persian Spot)
Nov 15	Fuji Stakes	OP	1800m	Turf	Firm	Tokyo	6	1st	1:47.6	-0.1	Yukio Okabe	(Kyoei Bonanza)
Nov 22	Mile Championship	G1	1600m	Turf	Firm	Kyoto	18	2nd	1:33.5	0.2	Yukio Okabe	Daitaku Helios
1993 – five-year-old season
Apr 24	Keio Hai Spring Cup	G2	1400m	Turf	Firm	Tokyo	12	2nd	1:21.2	0.2	Yukio Okabe	Yamanin Zephyr
May 16	Yasuda Kinen	G1	1600m	Turf	Firm	Tokyo	16	3rd	1:33.7	0.2	Yukio Okabe	Yamanin Zephyr
Jun 13	Sapporo Nikkei Open	OP	1800m	Turf	Firm	Sapporo	12	1st	1:47.6	-0.1	Yukio Okabe	(Golden Eye)
Oct 10	Mainichi Ōkan	G2	1800m	Turf	Firm	Tokyo	13	1st	1:45.5	-0.3	Yukio Okabe	(Sekitei Ryu O)
Oct 30	Swan Stakes	G2	1400m	Turf	Soft	Kyoto	16	1st	1:29.0	0.0	Yukio Okabe	(Stage Hero)
Nov 21	Mile Championship	G1	1600m	Turf	Heavy	Kyoto	15	1st	1:35.7	-0.2	Yukio Okabe	(Iide Zao)

== Pedigree ==
Pedigree of Shinko Lovely, bay mare, 1989
Sire Caerleon b. 1980	Nijinsky b. 1967	Northern Dancer	Nearctic
Sire Caerleon b. 1980	Nijinsky b. 1967	Northern Dancer	Natalma
Sire Caerleon b. 1980	Nijinsky b. 1967	Flaming Page	Bull Page
Sire Caerleon b. 1980	Nijinsky b. 1967	Flaming Page	Flaring Top
Sire Caerleon b. 1980	Foreseer dk.b. 1969	Round Table	Princequillo
Sire Caerleon b. 1980	Foreseer dk.b. 1969	Round Table	Knight's Daughter
Sire Caerleon b. 1980	Foreseer dk.b. 1969	Regal Gleam	Hail To Reason
Sire Caerleon b. 1980	Foreseer dk.b. 1969	Regal Gleam	Miz Carol
Dam Happy Trails b. 1984	Posse ch. 1977	Forli	Aristophanes
Dam Happy Trails b. 1984	Posse ch. 1977	Forli	Trevisa
Dam Happy Trails b. 1984	Posse ch. 1977	In Hot Pursuit	Bold Ruler
Dam Happy Trails b. 1984	Posse ch. 1977	In Hot Pursuit	Lady Be Good
Dam Happy Trails b. 1984	Roycon b. 1975	High Top	Derring-Do
Dam Happy Trails b. 1984	Roycon b. 1975	High Top	Camenae
Dam Happy Trails b. 1984	Roycon b. 1975	Madelon	Saint Crespin
Dam Happy Trails b. 1984	Roycon b. 1975	Madelon	Azurine
