= Leo Durban =

Japanese Thoroughbred racehorse

Leo Durban レオダーバン
- Breed: Thoroughbred
- Sire: Maruzensky
- Grandsire: Nijinsky
- Dam: Shirutiku
- Damsire: Dancer's Image
- Sex: Stallion
- Foaled: 25 April 1988
- Died: Unknown
- Country: Japan
- Color: Bay
- Breeder: Hayata Farms
- Owner: Ryuu Tanaka
- Racing colours
- Trainer: Shinji Okuhira
- Jockey: Yukio Okabe
- Record: 9: 4-1-1
- Earnings: ¥213,166,200

Major wins
- Japanese Classic Race wins: Kikuka-shō (1991)

Leo Durban (レオダーバン, Hepburn: Reo Dāban, foaled 25 April 1988) was a Japanese Thoroughbred racehorse who won the Kikuka-shō in 1991. His total earnings were 213,166,200 JPY before retiring.

== Background ==
Leo Durban was a bay horse born on April 25, 1988, foaled by Shirutiku, one of Dancer's Image's foal. He was sired by Maruzensky, an undefeated Japanese racehorse who was a son of Nijinsky.

== Racing career ==
=== 1990: Three-year-old Season (Note: Before the Japan adopted the international age system for racehorses in 2001, they used an old counting system called "kazoedoshi" where the horses were considered one year old at birth, hence the one year difference in the name and age qualifications of some races.) ===
Leo Durban made his debut race on December 2 at the Nakayama Racecourse. He was the second favorite and finished 1st by three and a half length. On his next race, he ran on a dirt race and was the favorite horse among the twelve runners but finished 4th.

=== 1991: Four-year-old Season ===
In his second season, he competed in the Yamazakura Sho, an allowance race where he was the favorite and finished first with a stunning five lengths. He then competed next in Aoba Sho, which was an open race at the time, and won against Ibukino Unkai. His next race was the Tōkyō Yūshun, with him being the second favorite. He ultimately finished 2nd with three lengths behind the Satsuki Shō winner and the favorite horse, Tokai Teio. Leo Durban's jockey, Yukio Okabe, later commented that "even if Takayuki Yasuda (Tokai Teio's jockey) made 3 or 4 mistakes, I still could not have beaten him."

His owner then decided to run him in the St Lite Kinen, with the horse being in single-digit bracket number 8 and horse number 13. Although he was the most popular among the other horses, he finished in 3rd place, behind Strong Kaiser and Twin Turbo. At the Kikuka-shō, he finally achieved victory again and won by one and a half length. At that moment, the announcer, Kiyoshi Sugimoto, shouted, "Leo in the horse world too!" This became a famous commentary, and his victory became memorable to the horse racing fans. Despite this, his victory was criticized as a "burglary" due to Tokai Teio's absence and his defeat in the Derby. He then developed tendonitis and this forced him to take a long hiatus.

=== 1992: Five-year-old Season ===
After a long break, Leo Durban ran in Arima Kinen in his third season where he finished in 13th place.

=== 1993: Six-year-old Season ===
Leo Durban started his last season at the American Jockey Club Cup, where he placed in 8th. After the race, his tendonitis reoccurred and was subsequently retired.

== Racing Record ==
In Leo Durban's racing career, he ran in a total of 9 races, placing 1st four times.

Date	Race	Grade	Distance	Surface	Condition	Track	Entry	Finish	Time	Margin	Jockey	Winner (Runner-up)
1990 – three-year-old season
Dec 2	3YO Debut		1600m	Turf	Firm	Nakayama	16	1st	1:36.3	-0.6	Norihiro Yokoyama	(Marine Jet)
Dec 22	3YO	ALW (1 Win)	1800m	Dirt	Fast	Nakayama	12	4th	1:55.8	0.9	Masatsugu Kashiwazaki	Stabilizer
1991 – four-year-old season
Mar 30	Yamazakura Sho	ALW (1 Win)	1600m	Turf	Good	Nakayama	14	1st	1:36.1	-0.9	Yukio Okabe	(Kiss in the Dark)
Apr 27	Aoba Sho	OP	2400m	Turf	Firm	Tokyo	17	1st	2:27.6	-0.3	Yukio Okabe	(Ibukino Unkai)
May 26	Tōkyō Yūshun	G1	2400m	Turf	Firm	Tokyo	20	2nd	2:26.4	0.5	Yukio Okabe	Tokai Teio
Sep 22	St Lite Kinen	G2	2200m	Turf	Firm	Nakayama	13	3rd	2:12.8	0.1	Yukio Okabe	Strong Kaiser
Nov 3	Kikuka-shō	G1	3000m	Turf	Firm	Kyoto	18	1st	3:09.5	-0.2	Yukio Okabe	(Ibuki Maikagura)
1992 – five-year-old season
Dec 7	Arima Kinen	G1	2500m	Turf	Firm	Nakayama	16	13th	2:35.2	1.7	Norihiro Yokoyama	Mejiro Palmer
1993 – six-year-old season
Jan 24	American Jockey Club Cup	G2	2200m	Turf	Good	Nakayama	9	8th	2:16.8	1.8	Norihiro Yokoyama	White Stone

== Stud Career and Retirement ==
Unlike his father, Leo Durban's foals were unsuccessful, with his leading progeny—A.P. Burst—only placing 2nd on the 2000 Elm Stakes. He had sired 185 horses in total.

After he left the Toyosato Stallion Center in August 2001, he returned to his birthplace, the Hayata Farm. Unfortunately, the said farm had gone bankrupt, and was unable to support the horses financially. Subsequently, his owner, Ryuu Tanaka, decided to take him despite his arrest due to suspicion of tax evasion. This led to his whereabouts left unknown.

== Pedigree ==
Pedigree of Leo Durban, bay horse, 1988
Sire Maruzensky b. 1974	Nijinsky b. 1967	Northern Dancer	Nearctic
Sire Maruzensky b. 1974	Nijinsky b. 1967	Northern Dancer	Natalma
Sire Maruzensky b. 1974	Nijinsky b. 1967	Flaming Page	Bull Page
Sire Maruzensky b. 1974	Nijinsky b. 1967	Flaming Page	Flaring Top
Sire Maruzensky b. 1974	Shill b. 1970	Buckpasser	Tom Fool
Sire Maruzensky b. 1974	Shill b. 1970	Buckpasser	Busanda
Sire Maruzensky b. 1974	Shill b. 1970	Quill	Princequillo
Sire Maruzensky b. 1974	Shill b. 1970	Quill	Quick Touch
Dam Shirutiku b. 1981	Dancer's Image gr. 1965	Native Dancer	Polynesian
Dam Shirutiku b. 1981	Dancer's Image gr. 1965	Native Dancer	Geisha
Dam Shirutiku b. 1981	Dancer's Image gr. 1965	Noors Image	Noor
Dam Shirutiku b. 1981	Dancer's Image gr. 1965	Noors Image	Little Sphinx
Dam Shirutiku b. 1981	Yamato Masaru ch. 1965	Kodama	Bouffleur
Dam Shirutiku b. 1981	Yamato Masaru ch. 1965	Kodama	Shiraoki
Dam Shirutiku b. 1981	Yamato Masaru ch. 1965	Miss Miharu	Miharu O
Dam Shirutiku b. 1981	Yamato Masaru ch. 1965	Miss Miharu	My Love
