= Keio Hai Spring Cup =

Keio Hai Spring Cup 京王杯スプリングカップ
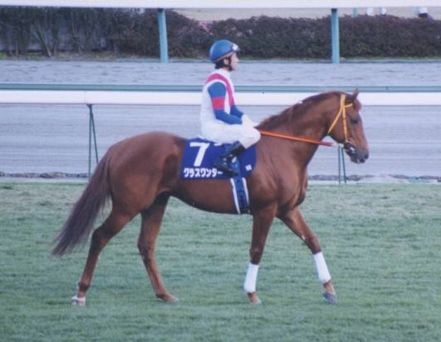
- The 1999 winner Grass Wonder
- Class: Grade 2
- Location: Tokyo Racecourse
- Inaugurated: 1956
- Race type: Thoroughbred Flat racing

Race information
- Distance: 1400 metres
- Surface: Turf
- Track: Left-handed
- Qualification: 4-y-o +
- Weight: Special Weight
- Purse: ¥ 128,140,000 (as of 2025): 1st: ¥ 59,000,000; 2nd: ¥ 24,000,000; 3rd: ¥ 15,000,000

The Keio Hai Spring Cup (Japanese 京王杯スプリングカップ) is a Japanese Grade 2 horse race for Thoroughbreds aged four and above and run in May over a distance of 1,400 metres at Tokyo Racecourse.

It was first run in 1956 over 1600 metres and was later run over 1800 metres before being run over its current distance for the first time in 1981. The race was elevated to Grade 2 class in 1984, and was changed to its current name that year.

This race also serves as a trial to the Yasuda Kinen, particularly since 2014 when the winner of this race would be awarded a slot in the race.

== Weight ==
57 kg for four-year-olds and above.

Allowances:

- 2 kg for fillies / mares
- 1 kg for southern hemisphere bred three-year-olds

Penalties (excluding two-year-old race performance):

- If a graded stakes race has been won within a year:
  - 2 kg for a grade 1 win (1 kg for fillies / mares)
  - 1 kg for a grade 2 win
- If a graded stakes race has been won for more than a year:
  - 1 kg for a grade 1 win

== Winners since 2000 ==
Year	Winner	Age	Jockey	Trainer	Owner	Time
2000	Stinger	4	Yutaka Take	Kazuo Fujisawa	Teruya Yoshida	1:21.0
2001	Stinger	5	Yukio Okabe	Kazuo Fujisawa	Teruya Yoshida	1:20.1
2002	God of Chance	4	Yoshitomi Shibata	Masamichi Wada	North Hills Management	1:20.3
2003	Telegnosis	4	Katsuura Masaki	Hiroaki Sugiura	Shadai Race Horse	1:21.0
2004	Win Radius	6	Katsuharu Tanaka	Kazuo Fujisawa	WIN	1:20.4
2005	Asakusa Denen	6	Hiroki Goto	Michifumi Kono	Genichiro Tahara	1:20.3
2006	Orewa Matteruze	6	Yoshitomi Shibata	Hidetaka Otonashi	Yuichi Odagiri	1:21.8
2007	Eishin Dover	5	Yuichi Fukunaga	Ken Kozaki	Toyomitsu Hirai	1:20.0
2008	Super Hornet	5	Yusuke Fujioka	Yoshito Yahagi	Tokuo Morimoto	1:20.8
2009	Suzuka Causeway	5	Hiroki Goto	Mitsuru Hashida	Keiji Nagai	1:20.6
2010	Thanks Note	5	Masayoshi Ebina	Yoshitaka Ninomiya	Yukio Shimokobe	1:19.8
2011	Strong Return	5	Shu Ishibashi	Noriyuki Hori	Teruya Yoshida	1:20.2
2012	Sadamu Patek	4	Craig Williams	Masato Nishizono	Sada Onishi	1:20.1
2013	Daiwa Maggiore	4	Masayoshi Ebina	Yoshito Yahagi	Keizo Oshiro	1:20.6
2014	Red Spada	8	Hiroshi Kitamura	Kazuo Fujisawa	Tokyo Horse Racing	1:19.7
2015	Sakura Gospel	7	Keita Tosaki	Tomohito Ozeki	Sakura Commerce	1:21.6
2016	Satono Aladdin	5	Yuga Kawada	Yautoshi Ikee	Hajime Satomi	1:19.6
2017	Red Falx	6	Mirco Demuro	Tomohito Ozeki	Tokyo Horse Racing	1:23.2
2018	Moonquake	5	Christophe Lemaire	Kazuo Fujisawa	Carrot Farm	1:19.5
2019	Tower of London	4	Damian Lane	Kazuo Fujisawa	Godolphin	1:19.4
2020	Danon Smash	5	Damian Lane	Takayuki Yasuda	Danox	1:19.8
2021	Lauda Sion	4	Mirco Demuro	Takashi Saito	Silk Racing	1:19.8
2022	Meikei Yell	4	Kenichi Ikezoe	Hidenori Take	Nagoya Keiba	1:20.2
2023	Red Mon Reve	4	Kazuo Yokoyama	Masayoshi Ebina	Tokyo Horse Racing	1:20.3
2024	Win Marvel	5	Kohei Matsuyama	Masashi Fukayama	Win Co., Ltd.	1:19.7
2025	Toshin Macau	6	Takeshi Yokoyama	Mizuki Takayanagi	Sato Co., Ltd.	1:18.3 (Note: Broke the course record)
2026	World's End	5	Akihide Tsumura	Manabu Ikezoe	Carrot Farm	1:18.9

== Earlier winners ==
- 1956 - Kuri Chikara
- 1957 - Hide Homare
- 1958 - Blessing
- 1959 - Kuripero
- 1960 - Sweet One
- 1961 - Shozan
- 1962 - Tricine
- 1963 - Suzu Hope
- 1964 - Kuri Light
- 1965 - Asahoko
- 1966 - Great Yoruka
- 1967 - Hishi Masahide
- 1968 - Mejiro Shingen
- 1969 - Monta Son
- 1970 - Minoru
- 1971 - Tamami
- 1972 - Daisenpu
- 1973 - Inter Brain
- 1974 - Takekuma Hikaru
- 1975 - Kikuno O
- 1976 - Yamabuki O
- 1977 - Nippo King
- 1978 - C.B. Queen
- 1979 - Golden Boat
- 1980 - Seabird Park
- 1981 - Symboli Friend
- 1982 - Ebisu Crown
- 1983 - East Boy
- 1984 - Happy Progress
- 1985 - Nihon Pillow Winner
- 1986 - Toa Falcon
- 1987 - Nippo Teio
- 1988 - Dyna Actress
- 1989 - Lindo Hoshi
- 1990 - Shin Wind
- 1991 - Daiichi Ruby
- 1992 - Dynamite Daddy
- 1993 - Yamanin Zephyr
- 1994 - Ski Paradise
- 1995 - Dumaani
- 1996 - Heart Lake
- 1997 - Taiki Blizzard
- 1998 - Taiki Shuttle
- 1999 - Grass Wonder

== See also ==
- Horse racing in Japan
- List of Japanese flat horse races
