= Yamanin Zephyr =

Japanese-bred Thoroughbred racehorse (1988–2017)

Yamanin Zephyr ヤマニンゼファー
- Breed: Thoroughbred
- Sire: Nihon Pillow Winner (JPN)
- Grandsire: Steel Heart (IRE)
- Dam: Yamanin Policy (JPN)
- Damsire: Blushing Groom (FR)
- Sex: Stallion
- Foaled: May 27, 1988
- Died: May 16, 2017 (aged 28)
- Country: Japan
- Color: Bay
- Breeder: Nishikioka Farm
- Owner: Hajime Doi
- Racing colours
- Trainer: Hironori Kurita
- Jockey: Katsuharu Tanaka; Yoshitomi Shibata
- Record: 20: 8-5-2
- Earnings: ¥596,209,600

Major wins
- Yasuda Kinen (1992, 1993); Keio Hai Spring Cup (1993); Tennō Shō (Autumn) (1993)

Awards
- JRA Award for Best Older Male Horse (1993); JRA Award for Best Horse By Home-bred Sire (1993); JRA Award for Best Sprinter or Miler (1993)

Yamanin Zephyr (Japanese: ヤマニンゼファー, Hepburn: Yamanin Zefā, 27 May 1988 – 16 May 2017) was a Japanese Thoroughbred racehorse who won the Tennō Shō (Autumn) in 1993 and the Yasuda Kinen in 1992 and 1993. He had multiple awards and accumulated a total of ¥596,209,600 after his racing career.

== Background ==
Yamanin Zephyr was a bay horse with a white star born on May 27, 1988 at the Nishikioka Farm, foaled by Yamanin Policy. He was sired by Nihon Pillow Winner, who was also a multiple G1 winner. His grandsire, Steel Heart, was an Irish-bred racehorse.

After his victory in the Yasuda Kinen in 1992, he and his father became the second generation of father and son to win it.

== Racing career ==
=== 1991: Four-year-old season (Note: Prior to Japan's conversion to the international age system for racehorses in 2001, they used an old age notation called "kazoedoshi", where horses are considered one year old at birth. Because of this, they are one year older compared to horses from other countries, despite biologically having the same age.) ===
Yamanin Zephyr made his debut race on March 9 at the Nakayama Racecourse. With an odds of 69.1 (12th favorite), he finished first by two lengths over Never Song. He also won his next race by a nose with a finishing time of 1:12.0. At his next race, the now-defunct Crystal Cup, he only placed in third. He later returned to a dirt race but ultimately finished in seventh despite being the third favorite. In December, he achieved victory once again where he barely won by a nose against Onward Wood. At the Sprinters Stakes, he failed to advance further, placing seventh.

=== 1992: Five-year-old season ===
He returned on January 6 where he placed second in the Sunrise Stakes. Afterwards, he won his next dirt race but only finished third in the Keio Hai Spring Cup. On the Yasuda Kinen, he won by three-quarter lengths, marking it as his first G1 victory. He then finished in second at the Centaur Stakes and fifth at the Mile Championship. He ran again in this year's Sprinters Stakes and finished second.

=== 1993: Six-year-old season ===
In his six-year-old season, he finished in second at the Yomiuri Milers Cup, while he placed in fifth at the Nakayama Kinen. Later on, he won both the Keio Hai Spring Cup and the Yasuda Kinen for the second time. After placing sixth in the Mainichi Ōkan, he won his third and final G1 race at the Tennō Shō (Autumn). After finishing in second at the Spring Stakes, he was retired.

== Stud career ==
He became a stud in Rex Stud and has sired a total of 554 foals. Some of his descendants are listed below.

Legend:

- c: colt
- f: filly

Foaled	Name	Sex	Major wins
1995	Sanford City	c	Musashino Stakes
1996	Hizen Hokusho	c	Tokyo Autumn Jump
2000	Passion Carry	c	New Year's Cup

He retired in his stud duties at the age of 21 and was castrated before being moved to Nishikioka Farm.

== Retirement and death ==
During his retirement, Yamanin Zephyr had a calm temperament and a good appetite. A farm staff member and Yamanin Zephyr's caretaker said, "When he was a stud, there were stories that he would glare at other horses, so he could be a bit noisy when he first came back to this ranch. However, once he started living a more relaxed life, he has developed a gentler personality. He follows a rhythm of letting out to graze every morning after 5am, collecting at 3-4pm, feeding, and grooming. He is in a daze when he is being groomed".

The staff also added, "Zephyr is a small horse, but when I think about how hard he ran and achieved such results, I realize what an incredible horse he is. I hope he will take it easy from now on and live a long, healthy life. Lots of fans will come to see him in the summer, so I hope they will see him in good health".

Yamanin Zephyr later passed away on May 16, 2017 at the age of 29 as a result of complications from old age.

== In popular culture ==
An anthropomorphized version of Yamanin Zephyr appears as a character in the Japanese multimedia franchise Umamusume: Pretty Derby, voiced by Riona Imaizumi. She is depicted as a free-spirited, idiosyncratic girl with a love for the natural world and following wherever the wind takes her. Her motivation to become the "embodiment of wind" was sparked when she witnessed a famous racer win the Mile Championship during her childhood, which is a reference to her real-life counterpart's sire, Nihon Pillow Winner. A theatrical act titled Umamusume: Pretty Derby The Stage -Sprinter's Story premiered in 2023 and features Yamanin Zephyr along with Daitaku Helios, Daiichi Ruby, and K.S.Miracle.

== Racing record ==
At the start of his career, Yamanin Zephyr mostly competed in dirt races, until he completely transitioned to turf in mid-1992. After the change, he also had a different jockey, Katsuharu Tanaka. He was ridden by seven different jockeys throughout his career.

Date	Age	Track	Race	Grade	Distance (Condition)	Bracket (Position)	Entry	Odds (Favored)	Finish	Time	Margin	Jockey	Winner (Runner-up)
Mar 9, 1991	4	Nakayama	4YO Debut		1200m (Sloppy)	7 (13)	16	69.1 (12)	1st	1:11.9	-0.3	Masahiro Yokota	(Never Song)
Mar 30, 1991	4	Nakayama	4YO	ALW (1 Win)	1200m (Good)	7 (9)	11	3.2 (2)	1st	1:12.0	0.0	Masahiro Yokota	(Meisei Heart)
Apr 13, 1991	4	Nakayama	Crystal Cup	G3	1200m (Firm)	2 (2)	14	7.9 (4)	3rd	1:09.0	0.4	Norihiro Yokoyama	Kalista Glory
Oct 26, 1991	4	Tokyo	4YO+		1200m (Sloppy)	4 (4)	12	4.7 (3)	7th	1:12.0	1.1	Norihiro Yokoyama	Kyoei Brand
Dec 1, 1991	4	Nakayama	4YO+		1200m (Fast)	4 (4)	12	3.5 (2)	1st	1:11.8	0.0	Seiji Ebisawa	(Onward Wood)
Dec 15, 1991	4	Nakayama	Sprinters Stakes	G1	1200m (Firm)	6 (11)	16	42.3 (10)	7th	1:08.6	1.0	Seiji Ebisawa	Daiichi Ruby
Jan 6, 1992	5	Nakayama	Sunrise Stakes		1200m (Fast)	4 (7)	16	3.5 (1)	2nd	1.10.9	0.1	Seiji Ebisawa	Symboli Garuda
Feb 2, 1992	5	Kyoto	Rashomon Stakes		1200m (Good)	8 (12)	13	4.6 (2)	1st	1:10.8	-0.1	Seiki Tabara	(Meisho Homura)
Apr 25, 1992	5	Tokyo	Keio Hai Spring Cup	G2	1400m (Firm)	6 (8)	13	45.1 (8)	3rd	1:21.7	0.1	Katsuharu Tanaka	Dynamite Daddy
May 17, 1992	5	Tokyo	Yasuda Kinen	G1	1600m (Firm)	8 (18)	18	35.2 (11)	1st	1:33.8	-0.1	Katsuharu Tanaka	(Kamino Cresse)
Sep 13, 1992	5	Hanshin	Centaur Stakes	G3	1400m (Firm)	7 (11)	14	4.4 (2)	2nd	1:23.2	0.4	Katsuharu Tanaka	My Super Man
Nov 22, 1992	5	Kyoto	Mile Championship	G1	1600m (Firm)	5 (9)	18	6.7 (3)	5th	1:34.0	0.7	Katsuharu Tanaka	Daitaku Helios
Dec 20, 1992	5	Nakayama	Sprinters Stakes	G1	1200m (Firm)	1 (2)	16	6.4 (4)	2nd	1:07.8	0.1	Katsuharu Tanaka	Nishino Flower
Feb 28, 1993	6	Hanshin	Yomiuri Milers Cup	G2	1600m (Firm)	7 (9)	12	3.3 (2)	2nd	1:37.0	0.6	Seiki Tabara	Nishino Flower
Mar 14, 1993	6	Nakayama	Nakayama Kinen	G2	1800m (Firm)	7 (11)	14	5.6 (2)	4th	1:47.3	0.3	Seiki Tabara	Movie Star
Apr 24, 1993	6	Tokyo	Keio Hai Spring Cup	G2	1400m (Firm)	6 (7)	12	3.9 (2)	1st	1:21.0	-0.2	Yoshitomi Shibata	(Shinko Lovely)
May 16, 1993	6	Tokyo	Yasuda Kinen	G1	1600m (Firm)	7 (14)	16	5.4 (2)	1st	1:33.5	-0.2	Yoshitomi Shibata	(Ikuno Dictus)
Oct 10, 1993	6	Tokyo	Mainichi Ōkan	G2	1800m (Firm)	4 (5)	13	3.8 (2)	6th	1:46.4	0.9	Yoshitomi Shibata	Shinko Lovely
Oct 31, 1993	6	Tokyo	Tennō Shō (Autumn)	G1	2000m (Firm)	4 (8)	17	11.7 (5)	1st	1:58.9	0.0	Yoshitomi Shibata	(Sekitei Ryu O)
Dec 19, 1993	6	Nakayama	Sprinters Stakes	G1	1200m (Firm)	5 (8)	14	2.2 (1)	2nd	1:08.3	0.4	Yoshitomi Shibata	Sakura Bakushin O

Dirt

== Pedigree ==
Pedigree of Yamanin Zephyr, bay horse, 27 May 1988
Sire Nihon Pillow Winner dk.b. 1980 (JPN)	Steel Heart dk.b. 1972 (IRE)	Habitat (USA)	Sir Gaylord (USA)
Sire Nihon Pillow Winner dk.b. 1980 (JPN)	Steel Heart dk.b. 1972 (IRE)	Habitat (USA)	Little Hut (USA)
Sire Nihon Pillow Winner dk.b. 1980 (JPN)	Steel Heart dk.b. 1972 (IRE)	A. 1 (GB)	Abernant (GB)
Sire Nihon Pillow Winner dk.b. 1980 (JPN)	Steel Heart dk.b. 1972 (IRE)	A. 1 (GB)	Asti Spumante (GB)
Sire Nihon Pillow Winner dk.b. 1980 (JPN)	Nihon Pillow Event b. 1974 (JPN)	China Rock (GB)	Rockfella (GB)
Sire Nihon Pillow Winner dk.b. 1980 (JPN)	Nihon Pillow Event b. 1974 (JPN)	China Rock (GB)	May Wong (FR)
Sire Nihon Pillow Winner dk.b. 1980 (JPN)	Nihon Pillow Event b. 1974 (JPN)	Lite Flame (JPN)	Rising Flame (IRE)
Sire Nihon Pillow Winner dk.b. 1980 (JPN)	Nihon Pillow Event b. 1974 (JPN)	Lite Flame (JPN)	Green Light (JPN)
Dam Yamanin Policy ch. 1981 (JPN)	Blushing Groom ch. 1974 (FR)	Red God (USA)	Nasrullah (GB)
Dam Yamanin Policy ch. 1981 (JPN)	Blushing Groom ch. 1974 (FR)	Red God (USA)	Spring Run (USA)
Dam Yamanin Policy ch. 1981 (JPN)	Blushing Groom ch. 1974 (FR)	Runaway Bride (GB)	Wild Risk (FR)
Dam Yamanin Policy ch. 1981 (JPN)	Blushing Groom ch. 1974 (FR)	Runaway Bride (GB)	Aimee (GB)
Dam Yamanin Policy ch. 1981 (JPN)	Haya Moyu dk.b. 1968 (JPN)	Guersant (FR)	Bubbles (FR)
Dam Yamanin Policy ch. 1981 (JPN)	Haya Moyu dk.b. 1968 (JPN)	Guersant (FR)	Montagnana (FR)
Dam Yamanin Policy ch. 1981 (JPN)	Haya Moyu dk.b. 1968 (JPN)	Miss Tarumae (JPN)	Hakuryo (JPN)
Dam Yamanin Policy ch. 1981 (JPN)	Haya Moyu dk.b. 1968 (JPN)	Miss Tarumae (JPN)	Badminton (GB) (Family: 1-m)
