= Yukio Okabe =

Japanese jockey (born 1948)

Yukio Okabe 岡部幸雄
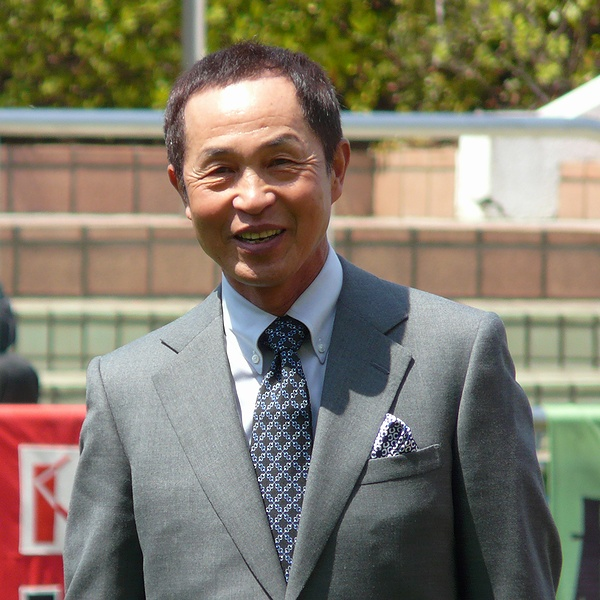

Personal information
- Nationality: Japanese
- Born: October 31, 1948 (age 77) Godo, Nitta District, Gunma (Currently Ōta, Gunma)
- Height: 161 cm (5 ft 3 in)
- Weight: 53 kg (117 lb)

Horse racing career
- Sport: Horse racing
- Career wins: 2937 (JRA) 25 (NAR)

Racing awards
- JRA Grand Prize Jockey (1987, 1991); JRA Award for Best Jockey (races won) (1987, 1991); JRA Award for Best Jockey (winning average) (1987–1993, 1995, 1996); JRA Award for Best Jockey (money earned) (1987, 1991, 1992, 1994)

Honors
- Japan Racing Association Hall of Fame (2014)

Significant horses
- Symboli Rudolf, Leo Durban, Tokai Teio, Biwa Hayahide, Shinko Lovely, Genuine, Bubble Gum Fellow, Shinko Windy, Taiki Shuttle, Symboli Kris S

Yukio Okabe (Japanese: 岡部 幸雄, Okabe Yukio, born October 31, 1948) is a Japanese former jockey and horse racing commentator. He was a member of the Japan Racing Association (JRA) from 1967 to 2005. From January 1995 to July 2007, he held the record for the most wins as a jockey in the JRA, with the eventual total of 2,943 wins.

== Early life ==
Okabe was born on October 31, 1948, in Gunma Prefecture, Japan. He was born to a family of farmers who also raised horses. Okabe began riding horses in early childhood, and by the time he was in elementary school he was able to trot and canter on his own. It was during his time in junior high school that he began to seriously pursue a career as a jockey.

== Career ==
Okabe began his career as a jockey in the fall of his third year in junior high school. He applied to the jockey training center of Bajikōen, took the exam with the consent of his father, and passed the exam.

In 1978, he achieved 500 wins and held a commemorative party. Hachiro Kasuga, Kyosen Ōhashi, Tarō Yamada and others attended, and his colleague, Itō, sang Hiroshi Itsuki's "Futari no Tabiji".

During his time as the top jockey of Kantō region, Okabe was strong in long-distance races, winning 7 each of Diamond Stakes (3200m) and Stayers Stakes (3600m) (both are the most wins in race history). He also won the Kikuka Award (3000m) three times and the Tennō Award (3200m) four times in the eight major races, and was called the "long-distance oni".

On January 14, 1995, Okabe had achieved a total of 2,017 wins, the highest number in the history of the Japan Racing Association (JRA).

In 1998, he rode on Taiki Shuttle and won the French Jacques Le Marois Award, achieving the long-sought international G1 victory outside Japan. For his achievements abroad, he is said to be a pioneer of Japanese jockeys riding outside Japan.

On January 24, 1999, he reached a total of 2,500 wins for the first time in the history of the JRA Cup.

Okabe retired from horseracing in March 2005.

== Major wins ==
France

- Prix Jacques Le Marois - (1) - Taiki Shuttle (1998)

Japan

- Asahi Hai Sansai Stakes - (1) - Bubble Gum Fellow (1995)
- Arima Kinen - (3) - Symboli Rudolf (1984, 1985), Oguri Cap (1988)
- February Stakes - (2) - Shinko Windy (1997), Gourmet Frontier (1998)
- Japan Cup - (2) - Symboli Rudolf (1985), Tokai Teio (1992)
- Japan Cup Dirt - (1) - Wing Arrow (2000)
- Kikuka-shō - (3) - Symboli Rudolf (1984), Leo Durban (1991), Biwa Hayahide (1993)
- Mile Championship - (3) - Shinko Lovely (1993), Genuine (1996), Taiki Shuttle (1998)
- NHK Mile Cup - (1) - Eagle Cafe (2000)
- Satsuki Shō - (3) - Symboli Rudolf (1984), Dyna Cosmos (1986), Genuine (1995)
- Sprinters Stakes - (1) - Taiki Shuttle (1997)
- Takamatsunomiya Hai - (1) - Shinko King (1997)
- Takarazuka Kinen - (1) - Biwa Hayahide (1994)
- Tenno Sho (Autumn) - (2) - Yaeno Muteki (1990), Symboli Kris S (2002)
- Tenno Sho (Spring) - (4) - Green Grass (1978), Symboli Rudolf (1985), Kushiro King (1986), Biwa Hayahide (1994)
- Tōkyō Yūshun - (1) - Symboli Rudolf (1984)
- Yasuda Kinen - (3) - Bamboo Memory (1989), Taiki Blizzard (1997), Taiki Shuttle (1998)
- Yushun Himba - (3) - Kane Himuro (1971), Kei Kiroku (1980), Dyna Carle (1983)

== Bibliography ==
- ルドルフの背 [The back of Rudolf] (in Japanese). Ikeda Shoten. 1986. ISBN 4262143716.
- 馬、優先主義 (in Japanese). Medium. March 1992. ISBN 4944001274.
- ぼくの競馬ぼくの勝負 (in Japanese). Tairiku Bunko. June 1992. ISBN 480334129X.
- 馬、優先主義. 続 (in Japanese). Medium. November 1993. ISBN 494400138X.
- 馬、優先主義. 続々 (in Japanese). Medium. March 1995. ISBN 4944001428.
- チャンピオンのステッキ : 岡部幸雄が語る平成競馬の楽しみ方 : トウカイテイオーからナリタブライアンまでー。 (in Japanese). Communication House. March 1997.
- 馬、優先主義. 4卷 (in Japanese). Medium. April 1997. ISBN 4944001517.
- チャンピオンの密かなる愉しみ : 岡部幸雄の競馬ワールド (in Japanese). Communication House. April 1997. ISBN 4756310222.
- 勝つための条件 改訂新版 (in Japanese). Bookman. November 1997. ISBN 489308321X.
- 馬、優先主義. 5巻 (in Japanese). Medium. June 1999. ISBN 4944001614.
- 勝つ馬の条件 : 名手岡部・飛翔の蹄跡 (in Japanese). Nihon Bungeisha. February 2000. ISBN 4537140259.
- 勝負勘 (in Japanese). Kadokawa. September 2006. ISBN 4047100609.

== See also ==
- Japan Racing Association Hall of Fame
