= Swan Stakes =

Swan Stakes スワンステークス
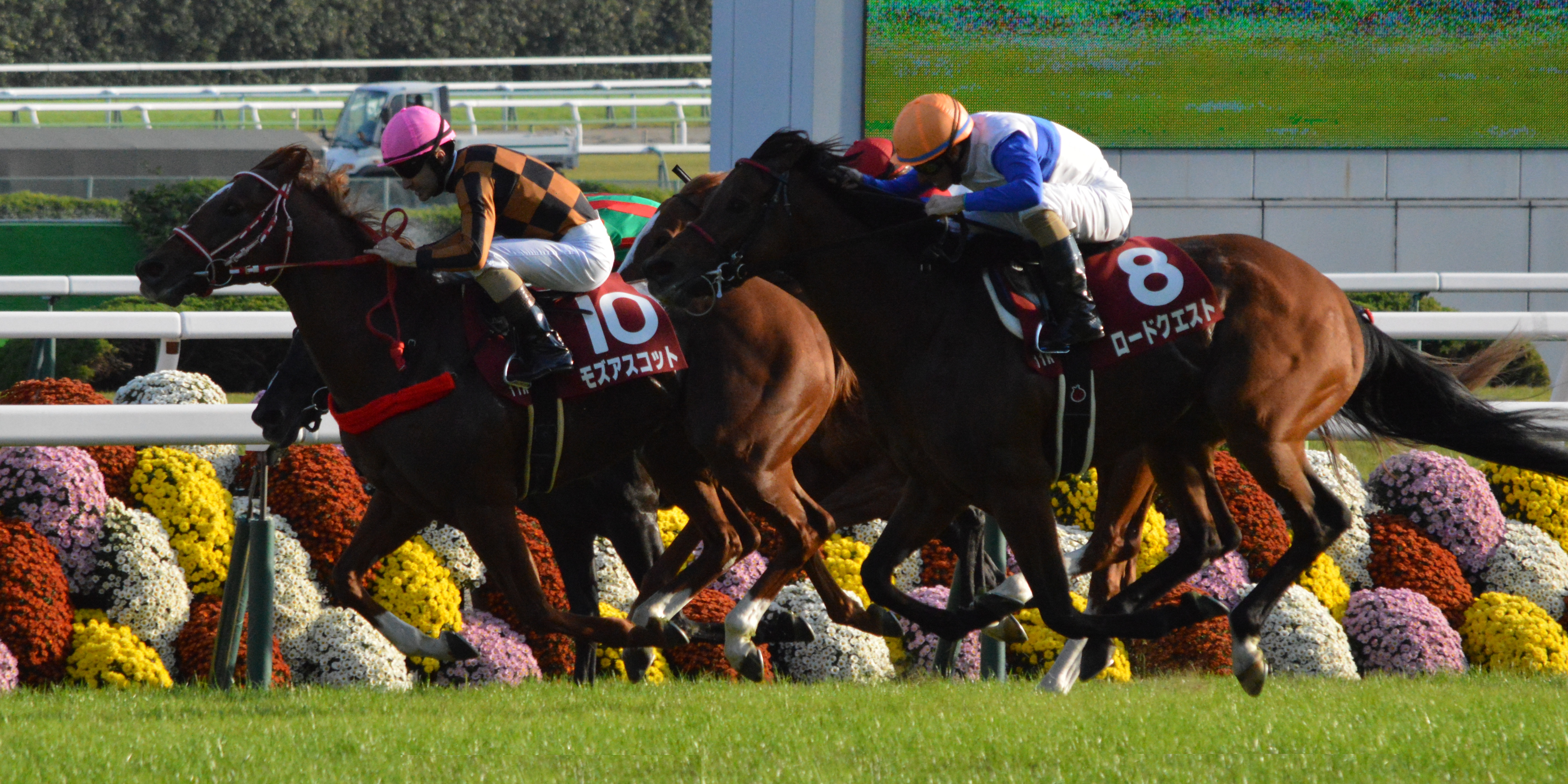
- Lord Quest winning the Swan Stakes in 2018
- Class: Grade 2
- Location: Kyoto Racecourse
- Inaugurated: 1958
- Race type: Thoroughbred Flat racing

Race information
- Distance: 1400 metres
- Surface: Turf
- Track: Right-handed
- Qualification: 3-y-o +
- Weight: Special Weight
- Purse: ¥ 128,140,000 (as of 2026): 1st: ¥ 59,000,000; 2nd: ¥ 24,000,000; 3rd: ¥ 15,000,000

The Swan Stakes (Japanese スワンステークス) is a Japanese Grade 2 horse race for Thoroughbreds aged three and over run in October over a distance of 1,400 metres at Kyoto Racecourse.

It was first run in 1958 as a 1800 metre race in spring for older horses before being shortened to 1600 metres in 1972. The race was promoted to Grade 2 in 1984 when it was reduced from 1600 metres to its current distance, moved from spring to autumn, and was opened to 3 year olds as well.

The race also serves as a trial race for the Mile Championship, with the winner of the Swan Stakes being given an entry slot for the race since 2014.

== Weight ==
55 kg for three-year-olds, 57 kg for four-year-olds and above.

Allowances:

- 2 kg for fillies / mares
- 1 kg for southern hemisphere bred three-year-olds

Penalties (excluding two-year-old race performance):

- If a graded stakes race has been won within a year:
  - 2 kg for a grade 1 win (1 kg for fillies / mares)
  - 1 kg for a grade 2 win
- If a graded stakes race has been won for more than a year:
  - 1 kg for a grade 1 win

== Winners since 2000 ==
Year	Winner	Age	Jockey	Trainer	Owner	Time
2000	Daitaku Yamato	6	Teruo Eda	Isao Ishikaza	Kazuko Nakamura	1:20.4
2001	Behind The Mask	5	Mikio Matsunaga	Shuji Kitahashi	Sunday Racing	1.20.8
2002	Shonan Kampf	4	Shinji Fujita	Yokichi Okubo	Tetsuhide Kunimoto	1.19.8
2003	Gallant Arrow	3	Hideaki Miyuki	Hiroki Sakiyama	Atsuko Tomizawa	1:20.2
2004	Tamamo Hot Play	3	Masaru Honda	Katsumi Minai	Tamamo	1:21.9
2005	Cosmo Sunbeam	4	Masaru Honda	Shozo Sasaki	Misako Okada	1:21.5
2006	Precise Machine	7	Masami Matsuoka	Kiyoshi Hagiwara	Seiichi Iketani	1:20.3
2007	Super Hornet	4	Yusuke Fujioka	Yoshito Yahagi	Tokuo Morimoto	1:20.7
2008	Meiner Rainier	4	Tetsuzo Sato	Masato Nishizono	Thoroughbred Club Ruffian	1:19.9
2009	Kinshasa no Kiseki	6	Christophe Soumillon	Noriyuki Hori	Kazumi Yoshida	1:20.3
2010	Maruka Phoenix	6	Yuichi Fukunaga	Masahiro Matsunaga	Kawacho Sangyo	1:21.0
2011	Ridill	4	Futoshi Komaki	Kojiro Hashiguchi	Koji Maeda	1:19.4
2012	Grand Prix Boss	4	Hiroyuki Uchida	Yoshito Yahagi	Grand Prix	1:20.5
2013	Copano Richard	3	Kota Fujioka	Toru Miya	Sachiaki Kobayashi	1:20.8
2014	Mikki Isle	3	Suguru Hamanaka	Hidetaka Otonashi	Mizuki Noda	1:20.3
2015	Albiano	3	Andrasch Starke	Tetsuya Kimura	Kazumi Yoshida	1:20.2
2016	Satono Aladdin	5	Yuga Kawada	Yasutoshi Ikee	Hajime Satomi	1:20.7
2017	Sungrazer	3	Cristian Demuro	Hidekazu Asami	G1 Racing	1:22.4
2018	Lord Quest	5	Mirco Demuro	Shigeyuki Kojima	Lord Horse Club	1:21.5
2019	Diatonic	4	Christophe Soumillon	Takayuki Yasuda	Silk Racing	1:21.3
2020	Katsuji	5	Yasunari Iwata	Kaneo Ikezoe	Kanayama Holdings	1:21.2
2021 (Note: Race took place at Hanshin while Kyoto was closed for redevelopment.)	Danon Fantasy	5	Yuga Kawada	Mitsumasa Nakauchida	Danox	1:20.8
2022	Diatonic	7	Yasunari Iwata	Takayuki Yasuda	Silk Racing	1:19.8
2023	Win Greatest	6	Masami Matsuoka	Yoshihiro Hatakeyama	Win	1:19.9
2024	Danon McKinley	3	Kohei Matsuyama	Hideaki Fujiwara	Danox	1:20.5
2025	Off Trail	4	Akira Sugawara	Keiji Yoshimura	Godolphin	1:18.9 (Note: Set the course record)
2026	Diamond Knot	3	Takeshi Yokoyama	Yuichi Fukunaga	Kaneko Makoto	1:19.2

== Earlier winners ==
- 1958 - Number 11
- 1959 - Goal Might
- 1960 - Minshu
- 1961 - Kodama
- 1962 - Caesar
- 1963 - Shimofusa Homre
- 1964 - Meizui
- 1965 - Asahoko
- 1966 - Ballymore Nisei
- 1967 - Epsom
- 1968 - Ryu Pharos
- 1969 - Daiichi O
- 1970 - Riki Eikan
- 1971 - Fast Bamboo
- 1972 - Takara Rose
- 1973 - Fuseno Suzuran
- 1974 - Fujino Takawashi
- 1975 - Itto
- 1976 - Long Fast
- 1977 - Flowcan Boy
- 1978 - Riki Taiko
- 1979 - Hokuto Boy
- 1980 - Agnes Press
- 1981 - Satsuki Rainbow
- 1982 - Agnes Venture
- 1983 - Hagino Kamuio
- 1984 - Nihon Pillow Winner
- 1985 - Korin O
- 1986 - Nippon Teio
- 1987 - Pot Tesco Lady
- 1988 - Shin Wind
- 1989 - Bamboo Memory
- 1990 - Narcisse Noir
- 1991 - K S Miracle
- 1992 - Dictar Girl
- 1993 - Shinko Lovely
- 1994 - Sakura Bakushin O
- 1995 - Hishi Akebono
- 1996 - Sugino Hayakaze
- 1997 - Taiki Shuttle
- 1998 - Royal Suzuka
- 1999 - Black Hawk

== See also ==
- Horse racing in Japan
- List of Japanese flat horse races
