= Matikanetannhauser =

Japanese thoroughbred racehorse

Matikanetannhauser マチカネタンホイザ
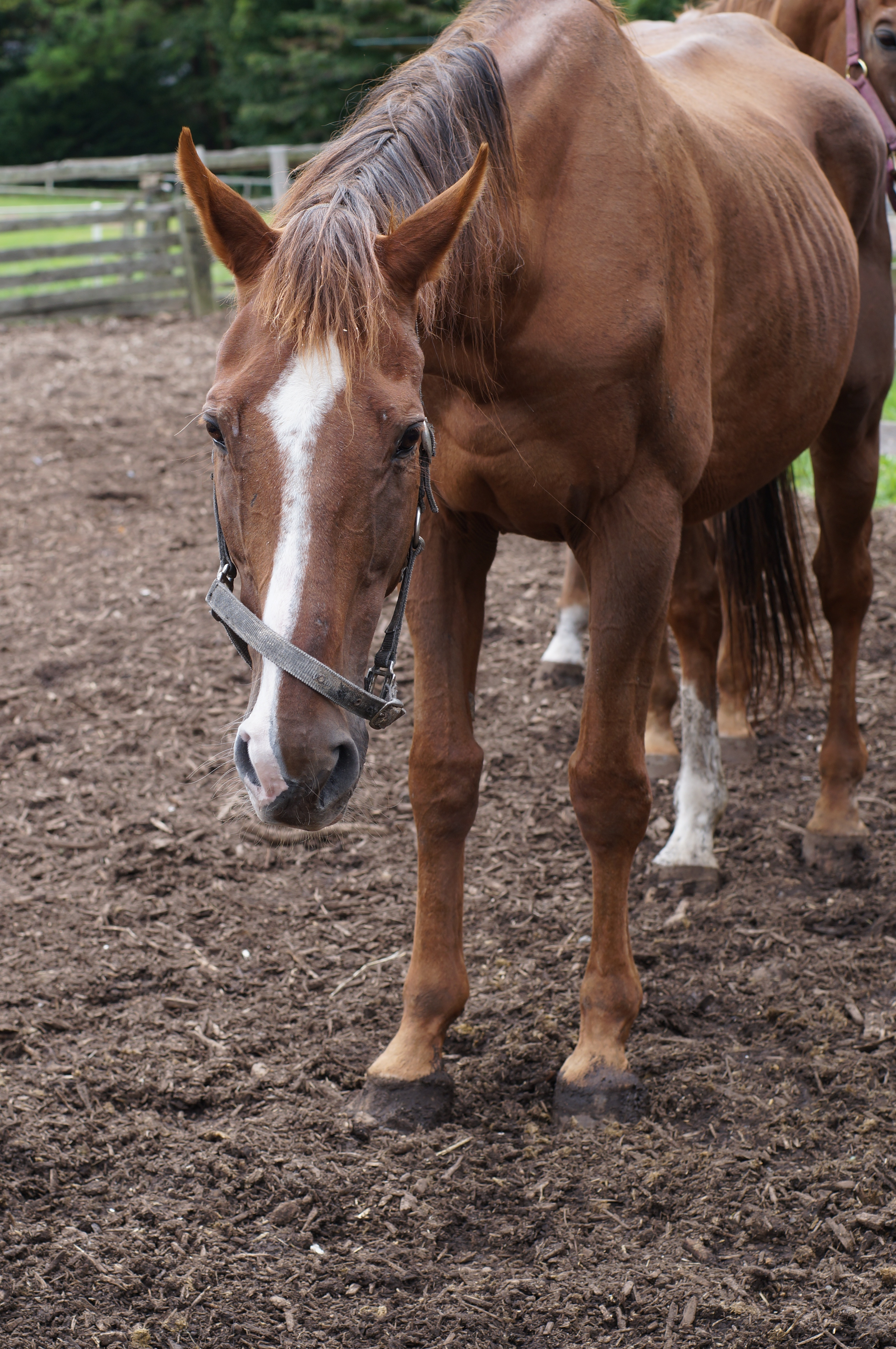
- Matikanetannhauser post-retirement (2012)
- Breed: Thoroughbred
- Sire: Northern Taste
- Grandsire: Northern Dancer
- Dam: Crippsii
- Damsire: Arrow Express
- Sex: Stallion
- Foaled: May 7, 1989; Biratori, Hokkaido
- Died: December 7, 2013 (aged 24)
- Country: Japan
- Color: Chestnut
- Breeder: Inahara Bokujo
- Owner: Masuo Hosokawa
- Racing colors
- Trainer: Yuji Ito
- Jockey: Yukio Okabe; Yoshitomi Shibata
- Record: 32: 8-2-2
- Earnings: ¥517,527,400

Major wins
- Meguro Kinen (1993); Diamond Stakes (1993); American Jockey Club Cup (1994); Takamatsunomiya Hai (1995)

Matikanetannhauser (Japanese: マチカネタンホイザ, Hepburn: Machikanetanhoiza; May 7, 1989 – December 7, 2013) was a Japanese Thoroughbred racehorse and sire whose major wins include the 1993 Meguro Kinen and Diamond Stakes, as well as the 1995 American Jockey Club Cup and the 1995 Takamatsunomiya Hai.

== Name ==
The horse was named after the Richard Wagner opera Tannhäuser with the Machikane eponym (kanmei, 冠名, a name added to horses of a specific owner) added. In Japan, the registering of racehorse names is under the jurisdiction of the Nihon Keishuba Toroku Kyokai (ja:日本軽種馬登録協会) (Japan Association for International Racing and Stud Book since 2010), and their rules state that no horse shall have names with only one character or more than 10 characters. As a result, the horse's Japanese name dropped the"ー"from "マチカネタンホイザー" and was registered as "マチカネタンホイザ".

When registering a horse name, the name is also registered in the Latin alphabet. However, the rules set in the International Agreement on Breeding, Racing and Wagering forbids a name longer than 18 letters including spaces, and also that a horse whose name is derived from anything abroad should be spelled the same way it is spelled in its home country. As the name "Machikane" (9 letters) and "Tannhäuser" (10 letters) put together will total 19 letters, the eponym was shortened to "Matikane", which is in line with how it would be written in Kunrei-shiki, the space omitted, and merged with "Tannhauser", ultimately earning the name "Matikanetannhauser".

== Racing career ==
- JBIS-Search is the source of this section unless otherwise stated

Matikanetannhauser debuted at a maiden race held on Chukyo Racecourse on September 15, 1991, winning the race at a record time of 1 minute and 43.1 second. After coming in fourth place in the Icho Stakes, the horse won his second race at the Fuchu Sansai Stakes. The horse was then sent to the Asahi Hai Sansai Stakes but finished fourth behind Mihono Bourbon. After becoming three years old, he started the season off with the Kyodo Tsushin Hai Yonsai Stakes where he finished fourth. He was then entered in to the Triple Crown races, where he finished seventh in the Satsuki Shō and fourth in Tōkyō Yūshun, both times losing to Mihono Bourbon once again. In the autumn season, the horse finished second behind Victory Hauler in the Cassiopea Stakes, but then at the Kikuka-shō, finished third behind Rice Shower, who snubbed the runner-up Mihono Bourbon from achieving the Triple Crown in that race.

After becoming an older horse, the horse started the 1993 season off with the Nikkan Sports Sho Kinpai where he finished 8th, before heading to the Diamond Stakes, where he won his first graded race by setting a record time of 3 minutes and 16.8 seconds. Two weeks later, the horse ran the Meguro Kinen, where he won his second graded race, with a 2 and a half length lead against the runner up Rice Shower. The horse finished fourth in the Spring Tenno Sho but then handily won the next race, the May Stakes held at Tokyo Racecourse. After coming in fourth at the Takamatsunomiya Hai, the horse was sent to rest in preparation for the Autumn season. In the Autumn season, the horse started the season off by winning the Fuji Stakes but finished at 15th place at the Japan Cup. In that season's Arima Kinen, the horse raced from the back of the pack and finished fourth behind Tokai Teio.

On his first race as a 5 year old, the American Jockey Club Cup, the horse once again raced from the back of the pack, before passing Fujiyama Kenzan on the home stretch and winning his third graded race and a first win at a clockwise racecourse. After this, the horse came in third behind Stage Champ at the Nikkei Sho and fifth at the Spring Tenno Sho. He then finished fifth at the Keihan Hai and ninth at the Takarazuka Kinen. His losing streak continued in to the Autumn season, finishing fifth at the Mainichi Ōkan and fourth at the Autumn Tenno Sho. He was then scratched from the Japan Cup after the horse suffered a nosebleed and was then scratched again in the Arima Kinen after suffering from hives on his face.

Matikanetannhauser was then planned to contest the American Jockey Club Cup as his first race as a 6 year old but the plan was scrapped after contracting phlegmon, before being sent out to pasture to recuperate. He subsequently took the entire Spring season off, starting the year off with the Takamatsunomiya Hai in July; which became his fourth graded race win. However, his next four races saw no success, ultimately retiring from racing after finishing seventh behind Stage Champ at the Stayers Stakes.

== Retirement ==
After retiring from racing, Matikanetannhauser stood stud at the Breeders Stallion Station, where he sired 45 horses over 8 seasons, 41 of which became a racehorse and 27 winning at least one race. His most successful progenies were Miyabi Gold, who came in third in the Edelweiss Sho, as well as Kura Egao, who came in third at the Madmoiselle Cup.

After retiring from breeding duty, he was pensioned at the Machikane Farm from 2006 before being moved to the Kosuda Farm in Kiyosato Kogen, Hokuto, Yamanashi in 2010. When he was pensioned at the Kosuda Bokujo, the horse was so relaxed that he was not bothered by Matikanefukukitaru trying to prank him except when he was trying to eat. However, the horse was unsuccessful in gaining weight no matter how much he ate due to having a weak intestine. On December 7, 2013, the horse died due to colic.

== In popular culture ==
An anthropomorphized version of Matikanetannhauser, appears as a character in the Japanese multimedia franchise Umamusume: Pretty Derby, voiced by Hikaru Tono. She is depicted as a cheerful, hardworking girl whose clumsiness frequently gets her into accidents, many of which end in nosebleeds, alluding to her real-life counterpart’s medical health setbacks and his withdrawal from the 1994 Japan Cup due to a nosebleed. She also frequently uses the catchphrase, “Ei, ei, mun!”, a modified version of the Japanese catchphrase “Ei, ei, oh!” She is recognizable for her penchant of wearing hats, which she modifies by cutting a hole in the crown that she could hook her ear onto, and which is something she does even with hats specifically designed for Umamusume that have dedicated ear holes.

== Racing form ==
The following form is based on data available on JBIS-Search and netkeiba.com.

| Date | Age | Track | Race | Grade | Distance (condition) | Entry | HN | Odds (Favored) | Finish | Time | Margins | Jockey | Winner (Runner-up) |
|---|---|---|---|---|---|---|---|---|---|---|---|---|---|
| Sep 15, 1991 | 2 | Chukyo | Maiden race | | 1700 m (Good) | 13 | 1 | 4.0 (2) | 1st | 1:43.1 | –1.0 | Yutaka Take | (Tokio Legend) |
| Oct 27, 1991 | 2 | Tokyo | Icho Stakes | OP | 1600 m (Heavy) | 14 | 13 | 1.8 (1) | 4th | 1:39.1 | 0.4 | Yutaka Take | Sanei Thank You |
| Nov 17, 1991 | 2 | Tokyo | Fuchu Sansai Stakes | OP | 1800 m (Firm) | 9 | 6 | 1.4 (1) | 1st | 1:49.5 | -0.5 | Yukio Okabe | (Tiger Ace) |
| Dec 8, 1991 | 2 | Nakayama | Asahi Hai Sansai Stakes | 1 | 1600 m (Firm) | 8 | 2 | 4.9 (3) | 4th | 1:35.0 | 0.5 | Yukio Okabe | Mihono Bourbon |
| Feb 16, 1992 | 3 | Tokyo | Kyodo Tsushin Hai Yonsai Stakes | 3 | 1800 m (Firm) | 11 | 7 | 3.7 (2) | 4th | 1:49.3 | 0.2 | Yukio Okabe | Air Jordan |
| Mar 29, 1992 | 3 | Nakayama | Fuji TV Spring Stakes | 2 | 1800 m (Soft) | 14 | 7 | 9.2 (4) | 5th | 1:51.8 | 1.7 | Yukio Okabe | Mihono Bourbon |
| Apr 19, 1992 | 3 | Nakayama | Satsuki Shō | 1 | 2000 m (Firm) | 17 | 15 | 24.5 (7) | 7th | 2:02.4 | 1.0 | Yukio Okabe | Mihono Bourbon |
| May 10, 1992 | 3 | Tokyo | NHK Hai | 2 | 2000 m (Soft) | 16 | 14 | 8.2 (3) | 2nd | 2:03.0 | 0.2 | Yukio Okabe | Narita Taisei |
| May 31, 1992 | 3 | Tokyo | Tōkyō Yūshun | 1 | 2400 m (Good) | 18 | 7 | 22.5 (8) | 4th | 2:29.2 | 1.4 | Yukio Okabe | Mihono Bourbon |
| Oct 24, 1992 | 3 | Kyoto | Cassiopea Stakes | OP | 1800 m (Firm) | 12 | 5 | 4.8 (3) | 2nd | 1:46.5 | 0.1 | Yukio Okabe | Victory Hauler |
| Nov 8, 1992 | 3 | Kyoto | Kikuka-shō | 1 | 3000 m (Firm) | 20 | 3 | 37.0 (11) | 3rd | 3:05.2 | 0.2 | Yukio Okabe | Rice Shower |
| Jan 5, 1993 | 4 | Nakayama | Nikkan Sports Sho Kinpai | 3 | 2000 m (Firm) | 13 | 13 | 3.1 (8) | 8th | 2:01.3 | 0.8 | Masato Shibata | Sekitei Ryu O |
| Jan 30, 1993 | 4 | Tokyo | Diamond Stakes | 3 | 3200 m (Good) | 14 | 6 | 1.9 (1) | 1st | 3:16.8 | -0.6 | Yukio Okabe | (Asuka Crown) |
| Feb 21, 1993 | 4 | Tokyo | Meguro Kinen | 2 | 2500 m (Firm) | 12 | 3 | 2.6 (1) | 1st | 2:32.4 | -0.4 | Yukio Okabe | (Rice Shower) |
| Apr 25, 1993 | 4 | Kyoto | Tenno Sho (Spring) | 1 | 3200 m (Firm) | 15 | 5 | 8.6 (3) | 4th | 3:18.6 | 1.5 | Yukio Okabe | Rice Shower |
| May 29, 1993 | 4 | Tokyo | May Stakes | OP | 2400 m (Firm) | 8 | 3 | 1.2 (1) | 1st | 2:26.7 | -0.1 | Yukio Okabe | (Eishin Tennessee) |
| July 11, 1993 | 4 | Kyoto | Takamatsunomiya Hai | 2 | 2000 m (Firm) | 14 | 8 | 3.8 (2) | 4th | 1:59.8 | 0.8 | Yukio Okabe | Longchamp Boy |
| Nov 14, 1993 | 4 | Tokyo | Fuji Stakes | OP | 1800 m (Soft) | 12 | 9 | 2.9 (1) | 1st | 1:48.2 | -0.1 | Katsuharu Tanaka | (Stabilizer) |
| Nov 28, 1993 | 4 | Tokyo | Japan Cup | 1 | 2400 m (Firm) | 16 | 13 | 21.3 (13) | 15th | 2:26.1 | 1.7 | Yukio Okabe | Legacy World |
| Dec 26, 1993 | 4 | Nakayama | Arima Kinen | 1 | 2500 m (Firm) | 14 | 8 | 43.3 (13) | 4th | 2:31.6 | 0.7 | Yoshitomi Shibata | Tokai Teio |
| Jan 23, 1994 | 5 | Nakayama | American Jockey Club Cup | 2 | 2200 m (Firm) | 14 | 9 | 8.0 (4) | 1st | 2:14.1 | -0.1 | Yoshitomi Shibata | (Fujiyama Kenzan) |
| Mar 20, 1994 | 5 | Nakayama | Nikkei Sho | 2 | 2500 m (Firm) | 9 | 4 | 1.8 (1) | 3rd | 2:32.9 | 0.1 | Yoshitomi Shibata | Stage Champ |
| Apr 24, 1994 | 5 | Hanshin | Tenno Sho (Spring) | 1 | 3200 m (Good) | 11 | 7 | 19.6 (5) | 5th | 3:23.3 | 0.7 | Yoshitomi Shibata | Biwa Hayahide |
| May 14, 1994 | 5 | Hanshin | Keihan Hai | 3 | 2000 m (Firm) | 14 | 2 | 3.0 (2) | 5th | 1:59.8 | 0.9 | Yutaka Take | Nehai Caesar |
| Jun 12, 1994 | 5 | Hanshin | Takarazuka Kinen | 1 | 2200 m (Firm) | 14 | 10 | 38.2 (9) | 9th | 2:12.8 | 1.6 | Yoshitomi Shibata | Biwa Hayahide |
| Oct 9, 1994 | 5 | Tokyo | Mainichi Ōkan | 2 | 1800 m (Firm) | 14 | 10 | 11.5 (6) | 5th | 1:45.9 | 0.4 | Yoshitomi Shibata | Nehai Caesar |
| Oct 30, 1994 | 5 | Tokyo | Tenno Sho (Autumn) | 1 | 2000 m (Firm) | 13 | 7 | 31.3 (7) | 4th | 1:49.0 | 0.4 | Yoshitomi Shibata | Nehai Caesar |
| Nov 27, 1994 | 5 | Tokyo | Japan Cup | 1 | 2400 m (Firm) | 14 | 8 | DNS | | | | Yoshitomi Shibata | Marvelous Crown |
| Dec 25, 1994 | 5 | Nakayama | Arima Kinen | 1 | 2500 m (Firm) | 13 | 3 | Scratched | | | | Yoshitomi Shibata | Narita Brian |
| Jul 9, 1995 | 6 | Chukyo | Takamatsunomiya Hai | 2 | 2000 m (Firm) | 12 | 2 | 8.3 (3) | 1st | 2:02.6 | -0.2 | Yoshitomi Shibata | (Dancing Surpass) |
| Aug 20, 1995 | 6 | Hakodate | Hakodate Kinen | 3 | 2000 m (Soft) | 16 | 7 | 2.5 (1) | 8th | 2:03.4 | 1.0 | Yoshitomi Shibata | Inter My Way |
| Oct 29, 1995 | 6 | Tokyo | Tenno Sho (Autumn) | 1 | 2000 m (Firm) | 17 | 14 | 10.8 (5) | 6th | 1:59.3 | 0.5 | Yoshitomi Shibata | Sakura Chitose O |
| Nov 26, 1995 | 6 | Tokyo | Japan Cup | 1 | 2400 m (Firm) | 14 | 1 | 20.8 (11) | 12th | 2:26.1 | 1.5 | Yoshitomi Shibata | Lando |
| Dec 9, 1995 | 6 | Nakayama | Stayers Stakes | 3 | 3600 m (Firm) | 9 | 3 | 5.5 (3) | 7th | 3:49.9 | 2.8 | Yoshitomi Shibata | Stage Champ |

== Pedigree ==
Pedigree of Matikanetannhauser
| Sire Northern Taste 1971 ch. Canada | Northern Dancer; 1961 b. Canada | Nearctic | Nearco |
| Sire Northern Taste 1971 ch. Canada | Northern Dancer; 1961 b. Canada | Nearctic | Lady Angela |
| Sire Northern Taste 1971 ch. Canada | Northern Dancer; 1961 b. Canada | Natalma | Native Dancer |
| Sire Northern Taste 1971 ch. Canada | Northern Dancer; 1961 b. Canada | Natalma | Almahmoud |
| Sire Northern Taste 1971 ch. Canada | Lady Victoria; 1962 dk.b. Canada | Victoria Park | Chop Chop |
| Sire Northern Taste 1971 ch. Canada | Lady Victoria; 1962 dk.b. Canada | Victoria Park | Victoriana |
| Sire Northern Taste 1971 ch. Canada | Lady Victoria; 1962 dk.b. Canada | Lady Angela | Hyperion |
| Sire Northern Taste 1971 ch. Canada | Lady Victoria; 1962 dk.b. Canada | Lady Angela | Sister Sarah |
| Dam Crippsii 1975 ch. Japan | Arrow Express; 1967 b. Japan | Spanish Express | Sovereign Path |
| Dam Crippsii 1975 ch. Japan | Arrow Express; 1967 b. Japan | Spanish Express | Sage Femme |
| Dam Crippsii 1975 ch. Japan | Arrow Express; 1967 b. Japan | Soda Stream | Airborne |
| Dam Crippsii 1975 ch. Japan | Arrow Express; 1967 b. Japan | Soda Stream | Pangani |
| Dam Crippsii 1975 ch. Japan | Montaroch; 1963 ch. Japan | Montaval | Norseman |
| Dam Crippsii 1975 ch. Japan | Montaroch; 1963 ch. Japan | Montaval | Ballynash |
| Dam Crippsii 1975 ch. Japan | Montaroch; 1963 ch. Japan | Star Roch | Harroway |
| Dam Crippsii 1975 ch. Japan | Montaroch; 1963 ch. Japan | Star Roch | Corona |

- Matikanetannhauser is inbred 4 x 3 to Lady Angela, meaning that this mare appears in both the fourth and third generations of his pedigree.
- Matikanetannhauser's half sister, Shibasky (sire: Maruzensky) is the ancester of Wako Chikako, Dantsu Judge, and Meiner Starry. Another half sister, Coniston (sire: Pluralisme), is the granddam of Leo Meister and Meisho Ramses.
- Matikanetannhauser's great granddam, Star Roch, is the mareline ancestor of a number of successful horses, namely Sakura Yutaka O, Sakura Star O, Hard Berge, and Winning Ticket.
