= Legacy World =

Japanese-bred Thoroughbred racehorse

Legacy World レガシーワールド
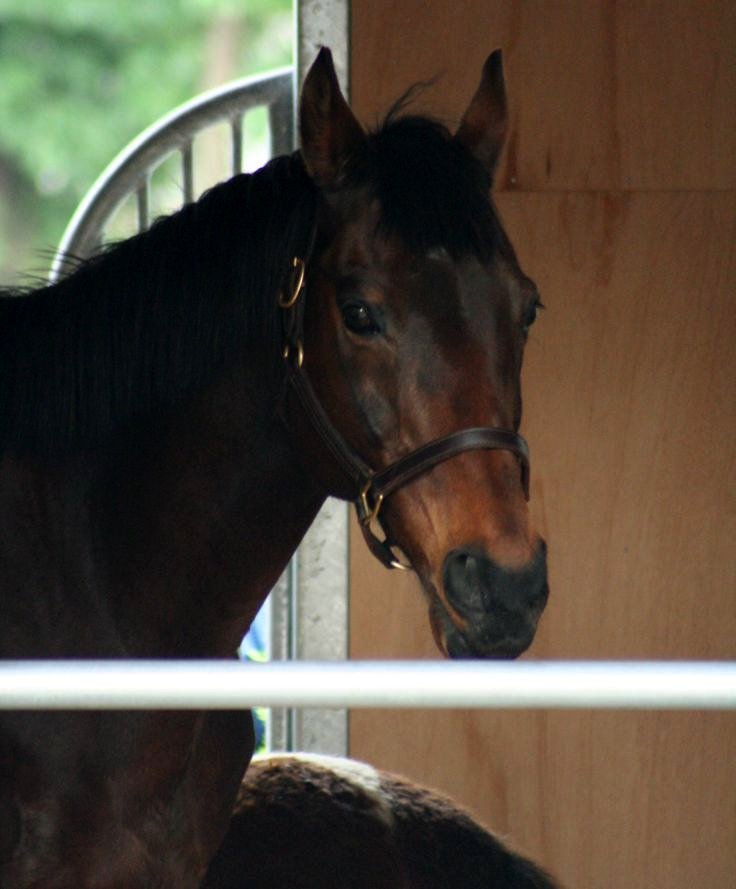
- Legacy World in retirement in 2007
- Sire: Mogami
- Grandsire: Lyphard
- Dam: Donna Lydia
- Damsire: Jim French
- Sex: Gelding
- Foaled: 23 April 1989
- Country: Japan
- Colour: Bay
- Breeder: Heihata Farm
- Owner: Horse Tajima Co Ltd
- Racing colours
- Trainer: Toyama Tameo; Hideyuki Mori
- Jockey: Sadahiro Kojima; Hideo Koyauchi; Hiroshi Kawachi
- Record: 32: 7-5-2
- Earnings: ¥423,774,000

Major wins
- St Lite Kinen (1992); Japan Cup (1993)

Legacy World (Japanese: レガシーワールド, Hepburn: Regashī Wārudo; 23 April 1989 - 18 August 2021) was a Japanese Thoroughbred racehorse best known for winning the 1993 Japan Cup. He failed to win in five starts as a juvenile and was gelded before the start of his second season. In 1992 he won six races including the Grade II St Lite Kinen, finished fourth in the Japan Cup and ran second in the Arima Kinen. In the following year he was lightly raced and made only two appearances before defeating a top-class international field in the Japan Cup at Tokyo Racecourse. His later career was blighted by injury, and he failed to win in fourteen subsequent races before being retired in 1996.

== Background ==
Legacy World was a bay gelding with no white markings bred in Japan by the Heihata Farm. His sire Mogami raced in France where he won the valuable Prix des Foals at Deauville Racecourse in 1978 before retiring to become a breeding stallion in Japan. He sired several major winners including Sirius Symboli (Tokyo Yushun), Mejiro Ramonu (Yushun Himba) and Buzen Candle (Shuka Sho). Legacy World was one of several winners produced by the Japanese mare Donna Lydia, an unraced daughter of the American stallion Jim French. She was descended from Propontis, a British broodmare who was imported to Japan in the first decade of the 20th century.

During his track career, Legacy World raced in the colours of Horse Tajima Co Ltd and was initially trained by Toyama Tameo.

== Racing career ==
=== 1991: two-year-old season ===
Legacy World failed to win in five races as a two-year-old in 1991. Competing exclusively in maiden races, he finished fourth over 1200 metres at Hakodate Racecourse on his debut on 18 August and then ran second over the same course and distance six days later. The best of his three subsequent efforts came when he finished third to Dyna Splendor over 1600 metres at Kyoto Racecourse in October. At the end of his first season, Legacy World's lack of success and difficult temperament led to the decision to have the colt gelded.

=== 1992: three-year-old season ===
On his debut as a three-year-old, Legacy World recorded his first win when he defeated fifteen opponents in a maiden over 1800 metres at Fukushima Racecourse on 11 July. He finished third at Niigata Racecourse two weeks later and then won twice at Hakodate in August, taking the Okushiri Tokubetsu over 2000 metres and the Matsumae Tokubetsu over 2500 metres. On September 13 the gelding finished second to the four-year-old filly Janis at Hakodate and was then moved up in class for the Grade II St Lite Kinen over 2200 metres at Nakayama Racecourse two weeks later. He recorded his first major victory as he defeated the Tokyo Yushun runner-up Rice Shower, with Super Sovereign in third, but, as a gelding, he was ineligible to run in the Kikuka Sho which was won by Rice Shower. In October, Legacy World won the Tokyo Sports Hai over 2400 metres at Tokyo Racecourse and on 8 November he recorded his sixth victory of the year when he took the Doncaster Stakes over the same distance at Kyoto.

On 29 November at Tokyo, Legacy World was moved up to the highest level and started a 16.9/1 outsider for the twelfth running of the Japan Cup over 2400 metres. Ridden by Hideo Koyauchi, he finished fourth of the fourteen runners behind Tokai Teio, Naturalism and the Arlington Million winner Dear Doctor. The unplaced horses included User Friendly, Let's Elope, Dr Devious and Quest for Fame. On his final appearance of the year, Legacy World was invited to compete in the Arima Kinen over 2500 metres at Nakayama on 27 December and finished second of the sixteen runners behind the five-year-old Mejiro Palmer with Nice Nature in third.

=== 1993: four-year-old season ===
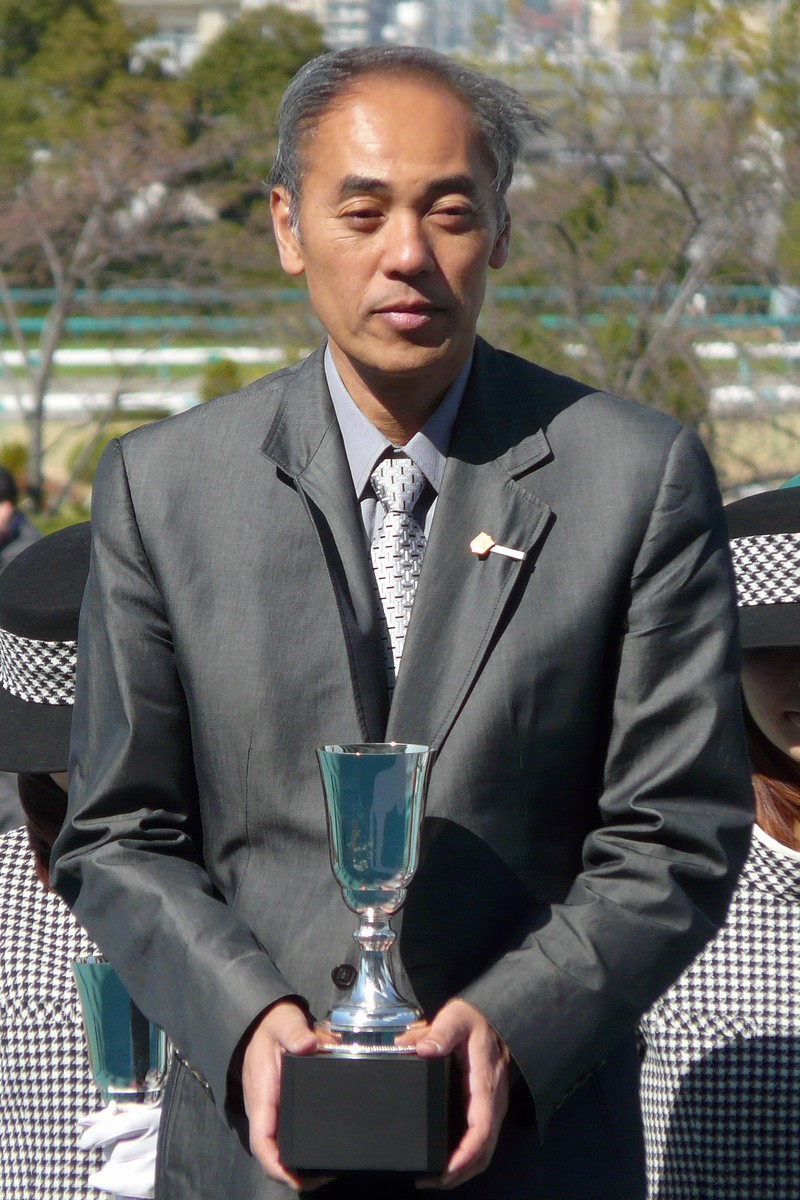
Hideyuki Mori, who trained Legacy World to win the Japan Cup

Legacy World returned in January 1993 at Nakayama and finished second to the six-year-old White Stone in the Grade II American Jockey Club Cup over 2200 metres. After Toyama's death in May 1993, the gelding entered the stable of the first-season trainer Hideyuki Mori.

After an absence of more than eight months, Legacy World returned in the Grade II Kyoto Daishoten over 2400 metres on 10 October and finished second of the ten runners to Mejiro McQueen. On 28 November, in front of a record crowd of 175,000, the gelding made his second attempt to win the Japan Cup, a race which pitted seven Japanese horses against nine overseas challengers, and started at odds of 11.5/1. The other Japanese runners were Winning Ticket (Tokyo Yushun), Rice Shower, Mejiro Palmer, Matikanetannhauser (third in the Kikuka Sho), Nice Nature and the dirt racer Hashiru Shogun (Teio Sho). The North American contingent comprised Kotashaan (the 4.2/1 favourite), Star of Cozzene and Luazar (Del Mar Handicap) whilst Europe was represented by White Muzzle (Derby Italiano) from Britain, Urban Sea from France, Misil (Premio Roma) from Italy and Platini (Gran Premio di Milano) from Germany. The other two runners were Naturalism from Australia and The Phantom Chance from New Zealand. Kawachi tracked the leaders and reached the final turn in second place behind Mejiro Palmer before taking the lead in the straight. He stayed on strongly in the closing stages to win by one and a quarter lengths with Kotashaan taking second in a three-way photo finish from Winning Ticket and Platini. Kent Desormeaux, the rider of the runner-up, was fined by the racecourse stewards after he mistook the finish line and stopped riding 100 metres from the end of the race. After the gelding's victory, Hideyuki Mori said "The horse was very lightly raced. Legacy World was therefore a fresh horse, specially prepared for the Japan Cup. This was his target". Kawachi, who was winning the race at the fifth attempt commented "I was secretly confident the big chance was today".

On his last run of the year, Legacy World was again invited to run in the Arima Kinen, but finished fifth of fourteen behind Tokai Teio on 26 December.

=== 1995 & 1996: later career ===
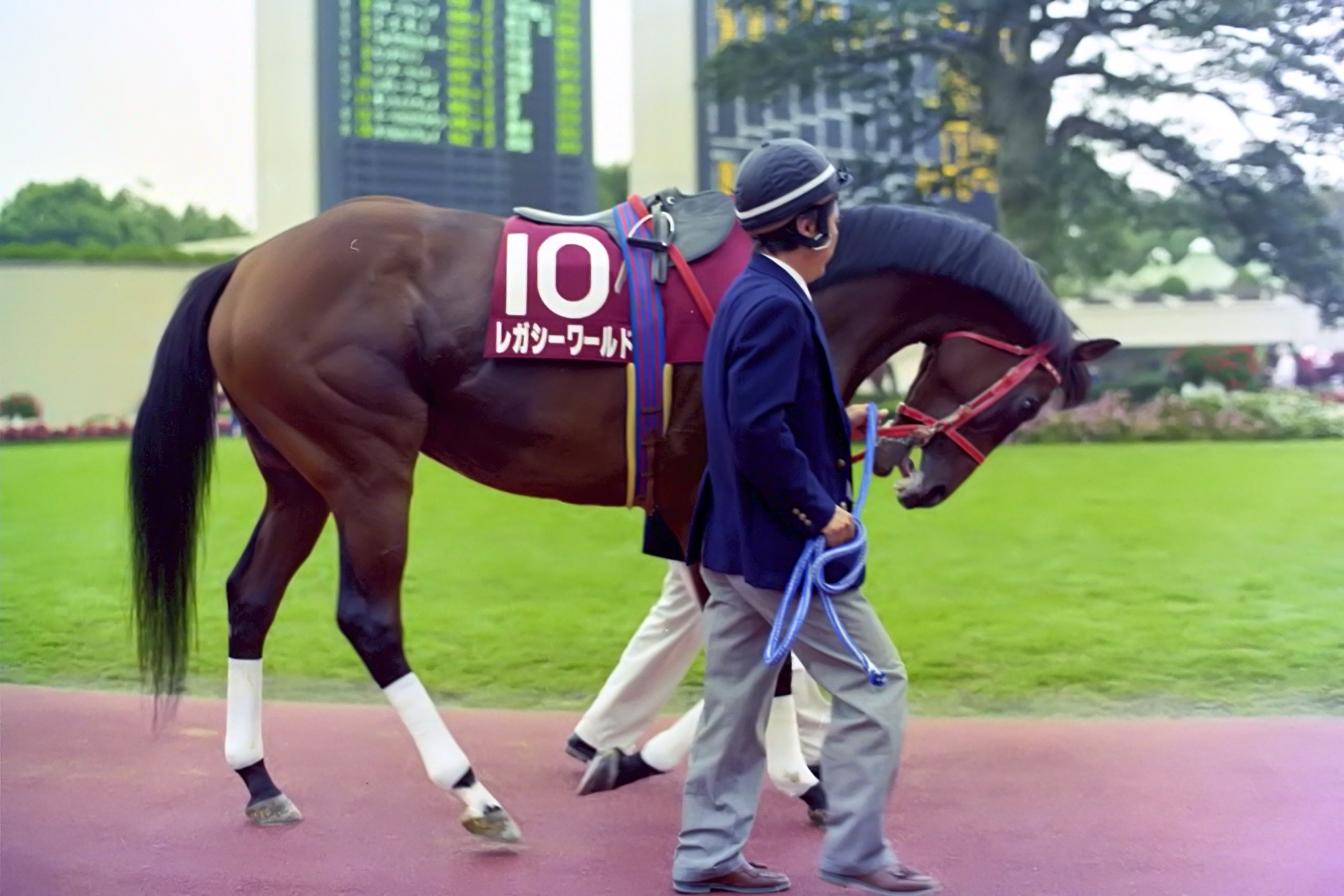
Legacy World at Kyoto Racecourse in 1995

Legacy World missed the whole of 1994 after sustaining a serious tendon injury, and although he returned for two more seasons in 1995 and 1996 he never recovered his best form. As a six-year-old he finished no better than ninth in six races. In his final season he ran seven times, finishing fourth in a minor race at Hanshin and ending his career by finishing eighth to Mayano Top Gun in Takarazuka Kinen on 7 July 1996.

At the end of his racing career, Legacy World was retired to a retirement facility in Hokkaido, where he died on August 18, 2021, due to infirmities of old age.

== Racing form ==
The following racing form is based on information available on JBIS search and netkeiba.

Date	Track	Race	Grade	Distance (Condition)	Entry	HN	Odds (Favored)	Finish	Time	Margins	Jockey	Winner (Runner-up)
1991 – two-year-old season
Aug 18	Hakodate	2YO debut		1200m（Firm）	7	2	13.5（4）	4th	1:12.1	1.0	Sadahiro Kojima	Hayano Kick
Aug 24	Hakodate	2YO maiden		1200m（Firm）	9	6	3.2（2）	2nd	1:11.8	1.5	Sadahiro Kojima	Air Jordan
Sep 7	Hakodate	2YO maiden		1200m（Heavy）	10	4	2.9（1）	5th	1:14.0	0.8	Hideo Koyauchi	Star Position
Oct 26	Kyoto	2YO maiden		1600m（Firm）	16	7	8.1（3）	3rd	1:37.4	0.2	Sadahiro Kojima	Dyna Splendor
Nov 16	Tokyo	2YO maiden		1800m（Firm）	18	5	4.5（2）	4th	1:50.6	0.9	Sadahiro Kojima	Persian Spot
1992 – three-year-old season
Jun 28	Fukushima	3YO maiden		1800m（Firm）	14	3	–	Scratched	–	–	Hideo Koyauchi	Cosmic Rays
Jul 11	Fukushima	3YO maiden		1800m（Firm）	16	14	4.2（2）	1st	1:52.0	0.0	Hideo Koyauchi	(Nishino Machine)
Jul 25	Niigata	Miomotegawa Tokubetsu	ALW (1W)	2200m（Firm）	13	10	5.4（2）	3rd	2:14.6	0.1	Hideo Koyauchi	Muguet Rouge
Aug 15	Hakodate	Okushiri Tokubetsu	ALW (1W)	2000m（Soft）	8	4	9.1（5）	1st	2:04.4	–2.1	Hideo Koyauchi	(Cheers More)
Aug 22	Hakodate	Matsumae Tokubetsu		2500m（Firm）	10	5	1.8（1）	1st	2:38.4	–0.1	Hideo Koyauchi	(Miss Kochoran)
Sep 13	Hakodate	UHB Hai	OP	1800m（Soft）	13	2	6.4（2）	2nd	1:52.1	0.6	Hideo Koyauchi	Janis
Sep 27	Nakayama	St. Lite Kinen	2	2200m（Firm）	14	9	7.3（4）	1st	2:13.6	0.0	Sadahiro Kojima	(Rice Shower)
Oct 25	Tokyo	Tokyo Sports Hai	OP	2400m（Firm）	10	3	1.8（1）	1st	2:26.1	–0.1	Hideo Koyauchi	(Heian Wassl)
Nov 8	Kyoto	Doncaster Stakes	OP	2400m（Firm）	10	5	3.8（2）	1st	2:24.8	–0.1	Hideo Koyauchi	(Hishi Masaru)
Nov 29	Tokyo	Japan Cup	1	2400m（Soft）	14	6	17.9（10）	4th	2:25.4	0.8	Hideo Koyauchi	Tokai Teio
Dec 27	Nakayama	Arima Kinen	1	2500m（Firm）	16	6	13.4（5）	2nd	2:33.5	0.0	Hideo Koyauchi	Mejiro Palmer
1993 – four-year-old season
Jan 24	Nakayama	American Jockey Club Cup	2	2200m（Good）	9	3	1.4（1）	2nd	2:15.4	0.4	Hideo Koyauchi	White Stone
Oct 10	Kyoto	Kyoto Daishoten	2	2400m（Firm）	10	9	4.4（2）	2nd	2:23.3	0.6	Hiroshi Kawachi	Mejiro McQueen
Nov 28	Tokyo	Japan Cup	1	2400m（Firm）	16	8	12.5（6）	1st	2:24.4	–0.2	Hiroshi Kawachi	(Kotashaan)
Dec 26	Nakayama	Arima Kinen	1	2500m（Firm）	14	9	4.9（2）	5th	2:31.7	0.8	Hiroshi Kawachi	Tokai Teio
1995 – six-year-old season
Aug 20	Hakodate	Hakodate Kinen	3	2000m（Soft）	16	15	5.7（2）	16th	2:05.3	2.9	Hiroshi Kawachi	Inter My Way
Sep 18	Nakayama	Sankei Sho All Comers	2	2000m（Good）	10	5	9.1（5）	9th	2:18.1	1.8	Hiroshi Kawachi	Hishi Amazon
Oct 8	Kyoto	Kyoto Daishoten	2	2400m（Firm）	13	10	13.0（6）	13th	2:28.0	2.7	Yutaka Take	Hishi Amazon
Oct 28	Tokyo	Ireland Trophy	OP	1600m（Firm）	11	9	9.5（3）	11th	1:35.6	2.3	Masayoshi Ebina	Trot Thunder
Nov 19	Kyoto	Mile Championship	1	1600m（Firm）	18	4	40.4（11）	13th	1:35.0	1.3	Yoshiyuki Muramoto	Trot Thunder
Dec 9	Hanshin	Naruo Kinen	2	2500m（Firm）	12	4	22.0（7）	9th	2:32.9	1.6	Hiroshi Kawachi	Kanetsu Cross
1996 – seven-year-old season
Jan 24	Kawasaki	Kawasaki Kinen	Grade-1	2000m（Fast）	12	6	0.0（4）	9th	2:10.8	3.3	Hiroshi Kawachi	Hokuto Vega
Feb 19	Tokyo	Meguro Kinen	2	2500m（Firm）	14	1	17.2（7）	8th	2:34.6	0.6	Hitoshi Matoba	Yu Sensho
Mar 20	Funabashi	Diolite Kinen	Grade-1	2400m（Fast）	8	6	0.0（3）	6th	2:34.1	2.8	Michael Roberts	Hokuto Vega
Apr 4	Hanshin	Osaka Jo Stakes	OP	2500m（Firm）	13	11	5.6（3）	4th	2:32.7	0.1	Katsumi Minai	Daitaku Surgeon
May 11	Kyoto	Keihan Hai	3	2200m（Firm）	16	1	12.1（6）	16th	2:15.4	2.6	Hiroshi Kawachi	Dance Partner
May 25	Tokyo	May Stakes	OP	2400m（Firm）	13	8	12.0（4）	7th	2:26.6	0.4	Hitoshi Matoba	Daigo Soul
Jul 7	Hanshin	Takarazuka Kinen	1	2200m（Firm）	13	2	35.4（9）	8th	2:13.1	1.1	Junichi Serizawa	Mayano Top Gun

Legend:
Turf Dirt

== Pedigree ==
Pedigree of Legacy World (JPN), bay gelding 1989
Sire Mogami (FR) 1976	Lyphard (USA); 1969	Northern Dancer	Nearctic
Sire Mogami (FR) 1976	Lyphard (USA); 1969	Northern Dancer	Natalma
Sire Mogami (FR) 1976	Lyphard (USA); 1969	Gooofed	Court Martial
Sire Mogami (FR) 1976	Lyphard (USA); 1969	Gooofed	Barra
Sire Mogami (FR) 1976	No Luck (USA); 1968	Lucky Debonair	Vertex
Sire Mogami (FR) 1976	No Luck (USA); 1968	Lucky Debonair	Fresh As Fresh
Sire Mogami (FR) 1976	No Luck (USA); 1968	No Teasing	Palestinian
Sire Mogami (FR) 1976	No Luck (USA); 1968	No Teasing	No Fiddling
Dam Donna Lydia (JPN) 1983	Jim French (USA); 1968	Graustark	Ribot
Dam Donna Lydia (JPN) 1983	Jim French (USA); 1968	Graustark	Flower Bowl
Dam Donna Lydia (JPN) 1983	Jim French (USA); 1968	Dinner Party	Tom Fool
Dam Donna Lydia (JPN) 1983	Jim French (USA); 1968	Dinner Party	Blue Haze
Dam Donna Lydia (JPN) 1983	Daigo Hamaisami (JPN); 1966	China Rock	Rockefella
Dam Donna Lydia (JPN) 1983	Daigo Hamaisami (JPN); 1966	China Rock	May Wong
Dam Donna Lydia (JPN) 1983	Daigo Hamaisami (JPN); 1966	Hamaisami	Vino Puro
Dam Donna Lydia (JPN) 1983	Daigo Hamaisami (JPN); 1966	Hamaisami	Miss Hagashi (Family 4-d)
