= Rice Shower =

Japanese thoroughbred racehorse (1989–1995)

Rice Shower ライスシャワー
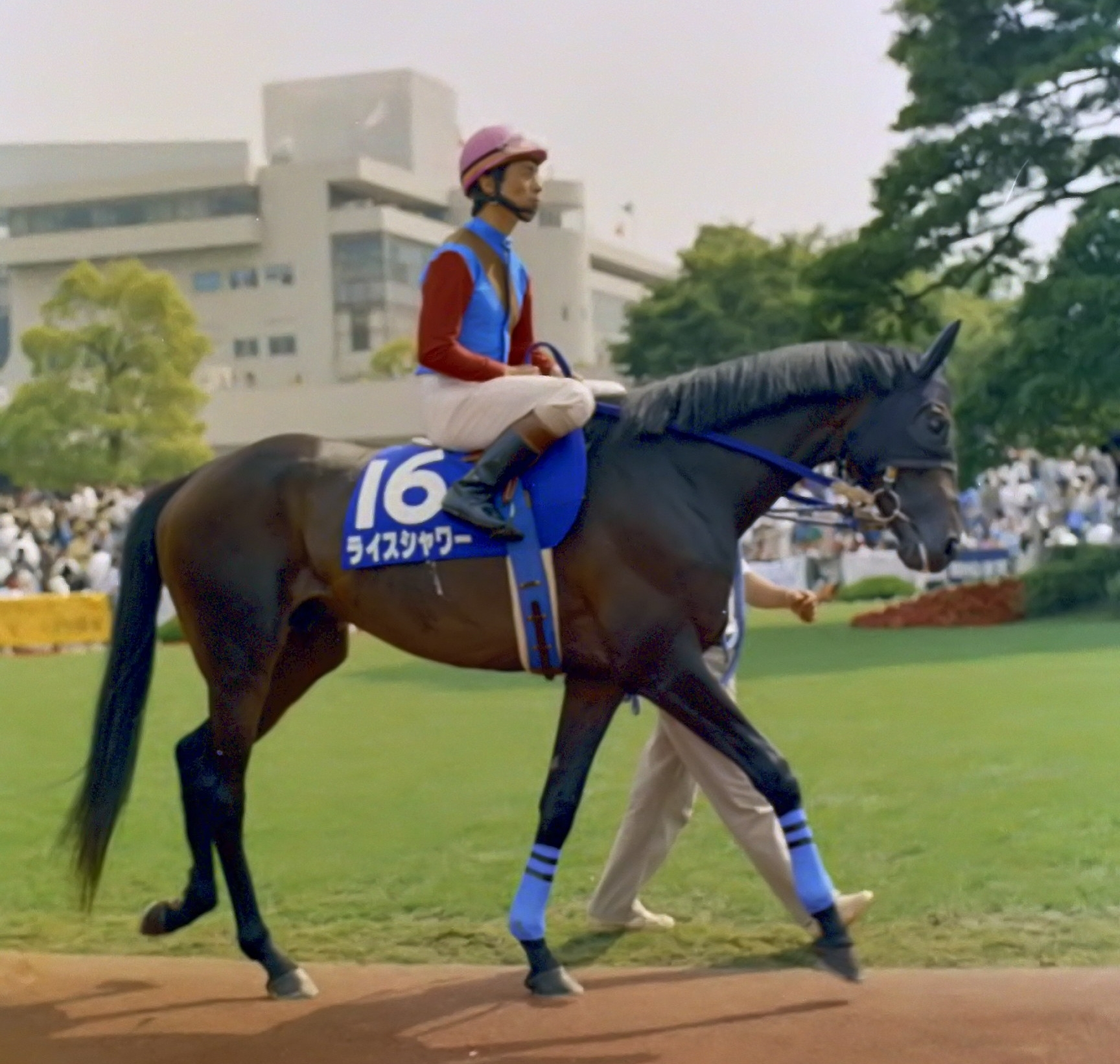
- Rice Shower at the 1995 Takarazuka Kinen
- Breed: Thoroughbred
- Sire: Real Shadai
- Grandsire: Roberto
- Dam: Lilac Point
- Damsire: Maruzensky
- Sex: Stallion
- Foaled: March 5, 1989
- Died: June 4, 1995 (aged 6)
- Country: Japan
- Color: Dark Bay
- Breeder: Utopia Bokujo
- Owner: Hideo Kuribayashi
- Racing colors
- Trainer: Koji Iizuka
- Jockey: Hitoshi Matoba
- Record: 25: 6–5–2
- Earnings: ¥729,497,200

Major wins
- Nikkei Sho (1993); Tenno Sho (Spring) (1993, 1995); Japanese Classic Race wins: Kikuka-shō (1992)

Awards
- JRA Special Award (1995)

Rice Shower (Japanese: ライスシャワー, Hepburn: Raisu Shawā; March 5, 1989 − June 4, 1995) was a Japanese Thoroughbred racehorse and stallion who won multiple graded stake races including the 1992 Kikuka-shō and the 1993 and 1995 Tennō Shō (Spring).

Rice Shower is known for preventing Mihono Bourbon from completing the Triple Crown in the Kikuka-shō and preventing Mejiro McQueen from achieving a third consecutive victory in the Tenno Sho (Spring), while finishing both races in record time, earning him the nicknames “The Assassin from Kanto,” “The Black Assassin,” and “The Record Breaker.”

Although he subsequently entered a slump, Rice Shower made a comeback by winning the Tenno Sho (Spring) a second time in 1995. However, he suffered a fracture during that year’s Takarazuka Kinen, was diagnosed with a poor prognosis, and was euthanized. That same year, he posthumously received the JRA Special Award.

== Background ==
Rice Shower was foaled on March 5, 1989, at Utopia Bokujo in Noboribetsu, Hokkaido, which was owned by Hideo Kuribayashi, chairman of Kuribayashi Transport. His sire Real Shadai was the winner of the 1982 Grand Prix de Deauville while his dam Lilac Point was a daughter of Maruzensky, who was undefeated in eight starts.

Although small in stature, he was healthy, and visitors from neighboring ranches highly praised the balance of his physique, even making offers to purchase him. At the end of October 1990, he was moved to Daito Ranch, a branch facility in Chiba Prefecture, for training and development. Although his appearance gave the impression of a “stiff-bodied horse,” those in charge reported that when ridden, he was so supple that it felt “like riding on a cloud.” Furthermore, he was a horse that required virtually no effort to break in, and his training progress consistently outpaced that of other horses.

After completing his training, he was stabled with Yoshitsugu Iizuka at the Miho Training Center in Ibaraki Prefecture on March 23, 1991. On April 4, he was officially registered under the name “Rice Shower.” This name was chosen in reference to the tradition of throwing rice during a wedding and it was supposed to evoke happiness that would come to everyone who came into contact with him. Alternatively, the name was chosen to express celebratory sentiments, as it coincided with the wedding of Prince Fumihito and Princess Kiko. Fumio Kawashima, who became his assigned stablehand, said that the horse’s small size stood out, and his anxiety outweighed his expectations.

== Racing career ==
=== 1991: two-year-old season ===
Rice Shower was supposed to make his debut at Sapporo Racecourse in July, when his two-year-old racing season began. However, he developed a fever in early July, forcing the cancellation of his first race in Sapporo, and his debut was postponed by one month to Niigata Racecourse on August 10. On race day, he was ridden by Takahiro Mizuno, a young jockey from the Iizuka stable, and was the second favorite. Racing from the front, he edged out Daiichi Riyumon by a neck in the final straight to claim his maiden victory.

In his second race, the Niigata Sansai Stakes, Yasuo Sugawara stepped in as a last-minute replacement after Mizuno received a one-day suspension the day before. Although the horse was the third favorite on race day, he got off to a slow start and was forced to race from the back of the pack; trapped on the inside of the field, he finished in 11th place. In his third race, the Fuyō Stakes, Mizuno returned to the saddle. Rice Shower took the lead at the entrance to the final straight and prevailed in a duel with the favorite, Ararat San, to claim his second victory. However, after this race, a fracture in his right front leg was discovered. He was diagnosed with a three-month recovery period and was placed under rehabilitation at the training center.

=== 1992: three-year-old season ===
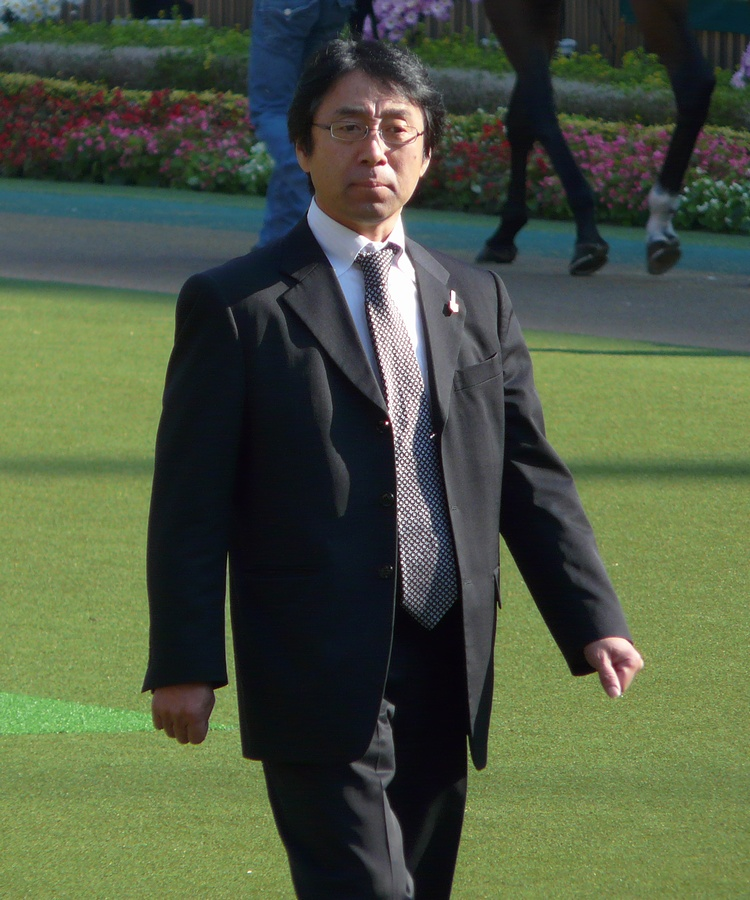
Rice Shower's primary jockey Hitoshi Matoba in 2010.

On March 29, 1992, Rice Shower, started his three-year-old season in the Spring Stakes, a trial race for the Satsuki Sho. It was decided that the task was too much for the young jockey Mizuno, so veteran jockey Masato Shibata was chosen to ride him. Hitoshi Matoba had also been approached, but he declined, citing prior commitments. In this race, Rice Shower faced Mihono Bourbon for the first time, finishing fourth behind him, who had won by a margin of seven lengths.

Hitoshi Matoba took over as jockey for the next race, the Satsuki Sho, which marked his debut in the Classics. In that race, Rice Shower lost speed just before the final turn and finished 8th, well behind the winner Mihono Bourbon; he also finished 8th in the NHK Hai, a trial race for the Tokyo Yushun. In the Tokyo Yushun on May 31, he was rated as the 16th favorite in a field of 18. However, having sensed that Rice Shower was in better form during the final workout, Matoba decided to ride him in second place behind the pacesetting Mihono Bourbon. In the final stretch, he was unable to close the gap on Mihono Bourbon and was briefly overtaken by Mayano Petrus, who was closing in from behind. However, Rice Shower managed to overtake Mayano Petrus who faltered at the end and crossed the finish line in second place. He became the key player in an upset, with the exact payout for Mihono Bourbon and Mayano Petrus totaling 20,958 yen.

Rice Shower spent the summer at Daito Farm to rest and returned to the stable in late July. He made his comeback on September 24 in the St. Lite Kinen. On that day, Matoba was at Hakodate Racecourse to ride Inter My Way in the Hakodate Sprint Stakes. As a result, Katsuharu Tanaka took his place in the saddle for the race. In the race, Legacy World took the lead, and Rice Shower moved to challenge him from the third turn, but finished second by a head. Iizuka expressed his displeasure that Matoba had gone to Hakodate without riding Rice Shower, and after the race, there was talk of a jockey change. However, the situation was resolved when Matoba, upon learning of this, apologized to Iizuka, and Matoba remained Rice Shower’s regular jockey.

In the Kyoto Shimbun Hai, Matoba returned as Rice Shower's jockey and was backed as the second favorite behind Mihono Bourbon in their fourth matchup. The result was a second-place finish, one and a half lengths behind Mihono Bourbon, marking his fourth consecutive loss; however, since the Kikuka-sho was set to be run over a 3,000-meter distance, a long-distance race that suited Rice Shower but not Mihono Bourbon, both Matoba and Iizuka reportedly grew more confident that they could turn the tables in the main event. After the race, Matoba told Ikuko Kuribayashi, the wife of owner Hideo Kuribayashi, “If only the front-runner Kyoei Bowgun had run, Rice Shower would have had a chance to beat Mihono Bourbon.” Since Matoba rarely exchanged casual words with horse owners and never initiated friendly conversation on his own, Ikuko was reportedly surprised by his words and attitude when she heard this.

==== Preventing Mihono Bourbon from Winning the Triple Crown ====
External Video Link
- 1992 Kikuka-sho (GI); Race video from the JRA official YouTube channel

On November 8, the day of the Kikuka-sho, Mihono Bourbon, who was set to become the fifth horse in history, and the second undefeated horse ever, to achieve the Triple Crown was the favorite at 1.5-to-1 odds, while Rice Shower was a distant second favorite at 7.3-to-1. During the race, Kyoei Bowgun took the lead ahead of the front-runner Mihono Bourbon, while Rice Shower settled into fifth place. On the final turn of the second lap, Mihono Bourbon passed Kyoei Bowgun, who had begun to fade, to take the lead, but midway down the home stretch, Rice Shower overtook him and won by a margin of one and a quarter length, achieving his first graded stakes victory in a Classic race.

Rice Shower's winning time of 3 minutes 5.0 seconds was the Japanese record for a 3,000-meter turf race at the time. This victory also prevented Mihono Bourbon from completing the Triple Crown. In a post-race interview, Matoba stated, “Both the horse and I were determined to do whatever it took to beat Mihono Bourbon, and I’m truly happy that our efforts paid off.” However, given the high expectations for Mihono Bourbon to complete the Triple Crown, the atmosphere in the stadium after the race was described as “no applause, more like booing” and “an unprecedented, somewhat strange atmosphere,” according to both Ikuko Kuribayashi and Sadahiro Kojima respectively. After the Kikuka Sho, Rice Shower competed in the Arima Kinen, where he was the second favorite behind Tokai Teio, who had won the previous race, the Japan Cup. However, Matoba failed to notice that Tokai Teio, who was positioned at the back of the pack, was struggling, causing him to delay his final surge, and he finished in 8th place.

=== 1993: four-year-old season ===
External Video Link
- 1993 Nikkei Sho (GI); Race video from the JRA official YouTube channel

In 1993, Rice Shower began his campaign with the Meguro Kinen. Although his weight was 59 kg, the heaviest of his career, Matoba believed that to win the Tenno Sho (Spring), Rice Shower needed the “class” to compete on his own merits. He therefore targeted Matikanetannhauser, the third-place finisher in the 1992 Kikuka-sho, and attempted a race strategy where Mejiro McQueen would keep pace with his opponent under his own power and overtake him at the end. Although he finished second, two and a half lengths behind, the team was satisfied with the performance, given that the horse was still in the midst of his preparation. In the subsequent Nikkei Sho, he was backed as the favorite for the first time and delivered a victory to live up to that support.

==== Preventing Mejiro McQueen from Winning a Third Consecutive Tenno Sho (Spring) ====
External Video Link
- 1993 Tenno Sho (Spring) (GI); Race video from the JRA official YouTube channel

His next race was the Tenno Sho (Spring), which had long been his target. With Mejiro McQueen winning the race two years in a row consecutively in mind, he underwent rigorous training designed to push him to his limits. However, the training was so grueling that it drew criticism—some worrying if the horse was being overworked—and was even mocked as being so harsh that “the horse will break down before it can beat Mejiro McQueen.” Nevertheless, this training paid off, and on the day of the Tenno Sho, he lined up with a body weight of 430 kg—12 kg lighter than his previous race and his lightest since the Tokyo Yushun.

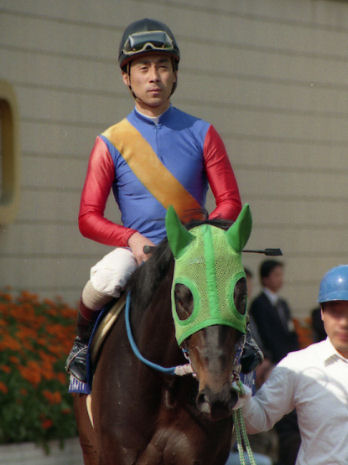
Hitoshi Matoba and Rice Shower during the 1993 Tennō Shō (Spring).

On race day, Rice Shower was the second favorite behind Mejiro McQueen. In the race, Mejiro Palmer took the lead, with Mejiro McQueen positioned in a group watching him, and Rice Shower right behind them. By the final turn of the second lap, these three horses had pulled completely clear, but halfway down the home stretch, Rice Shower caught up to Mejiro McQueen and went on to win by two and a half lengths. This victory prevented Mejiro McQueen from achieving a third consecutive Tenno Sho (Spring) title and jockey Yutaka Take from securing his fifth consecutive victory in the race. The winning time of 3 minutes 17.1 seconds was another record, following the one set in the Kikuka-sho. Immediately after the finish, commentator Kiyoshi Sugimoto announced, “Rice Shower, the assassin from the Kanto region, has defeated Mejiro McQueen, the overwhelming favorite in the Tenno Sho.” Following this race, Rice Shower earned the nicknames “The Assassin from Kanto,” “Black Assassin” and “Record Breaker.”

However, during the post-race interview with the winning jockey, the interviewer asked Matoba not about his “thoughts on the victory,” but rather his “thoughts on preventing McQueen’s third consecutive Tenno Sho title.” Matoba reportedly felt uncomfortable with the perception of Rice Shower as a villain or antagonist, and in his autobiography, he stated the following:

It’s true that we prevented Mihono Bourbon from winning the Triple Crown and thwarted Mejiro McQueen’s bid for a third consecutive Tenno Sho victory. Is that the impression people have—that we’re always getting in the way of these “idol horses” achieving historic feats? But racehorses and their jockeys are out there to win. There shouldn’t be any “villains” or anything of the sort.

(....) It was the same with Mejiro McQueen. Being called things like “the assassin from Kanto” or “the marker” is by no means a pleasant experience. I find myself thinking, “They don’t even know how I feel…”

We are doing our absolute best to win. Our efforts are intertwined with a variety of thoughts and strategies—so tightly and complexly woven that if even a single element were off, we wouldn’t be able to secure victory. That is precisely what I want people to see. I believe that is precisely what makes competition—and horse racing—so fascinating.

While viewing the horses as “idols” or “villains”—anthropomorphizing them and watching the drama unfold—may be one way to enjoy horse racing, there is surely a much deeper, more fascinating world unfolding there that can never be grasped through such a lens.

— Hitoshi Matoba

After the Tenno Sho, he was sent out to pasture and returned to the stable in early September. In his first autumn race, the Sankei Sho All Comers, Rice Shower was the favorite, but he was unable to catch Twin Turbo, who had pulled far ahead of the field early on, and finished third, just under six lengths behind the winner. In the Tenno Sho, where he aimed for a spring-and-fall double, he was once again the favorite but finished sixth. Subsequently, he suffered heavy defeats in the Japan Cup and the Arima Kinen, finishing 14th and 8th, respectively.

=== 1994: five-year-old season ===
Based on Iizuka’s belief that racetracks in the Kansai region might suit him better, Rice Shower's first race in 1994 was the Kyōto Kinen at Hanshin Racecourse. He finished fifth behind Biwa Hayahide, the previous year’s Kikuka-sho winner. After the Kyoto Kinen, his form began to improve, and in the Nikkei Sho, he took the lead in the final straight and finished second by a nose to Stage Champ, who surged past him, showing signs of a comeback. Afterward, with his sights set on defending his title in the Tenno Sho (Spring), he entered the Ritto Training Center to build up his conditioning.

However, during a workout on April 16, the week before the Tenno Sho, Rice Shower suffered a recurrence of the injury to his right front pastern bone that he had fractured as a two-year-old. This injury was much more serious than the previous one that threatened his racing career, and at this point, retirement was considered, and options for him to become a stallion were explored. However, due to his lack of achievements outside of long-distance races and the fact that his small frame made him unattractive to potential buyers, he was unable to find a home, and the decision was made to keep him in active competition. He was subsequently moved to Utopia Bojoku for rehabilitation. Although his return was expected the following spring, his recovery was faster than anticipated, and he returned to the stable at the end of October. Two months later, he made his comeback in the Arima Kinen. He finished third behind Narita Brian, who had become the fifth horse in history to win the Triple Crown and Hishi Amazon, who was considered the strongest filly at the time.

=== 1995: six-year-old season ===
External Video Link
- 1995 Tenno Sho (Spring) (GI); Race video from the JRA official YouTube channel

In his first two races of 1995, Rice Shower was the favorite in both, but the weight allowances of 60 kg and 59 kg, respectively, took their toll, and he finished sixth in both races. In the Tenno Sho (Spring), Narita Brian, who had won the Hanshin Daishoten by a landslide, was forced to withdraw due to injury. With Narita Brian absent from the Tenno Sho (Spring), Rice Shower was rated as the fourth favorite. With no pacesetter in the field, the race proceeded at a slow pace. When Rice Shower showed signs of wanting to move on the backstretch of the second lap, Matoba launched a long sprint 800 meters from the third turn. He broke away from the pack at the final turn to take the lead and attempted to hold on in the home stretch, but in the end, he crossed the finish line neck-and-neck with Stage Champ, who was closing in from behind. Following a photo finish, Rice Shower was declared the winner by a nose, marking his comeback victory, his first in 728 days since the same race in 1993. The margin of victory was a mere 10 cm.

Although there was a precedent where Yoichi Fukunaga had ridden Nihon Pollow Moutiers to victory in the 1971 Kikuka-sho using a similar strategy, making a move from the third turn in a long-distance race at Kyoto Racecourse was considered a ride that defied conventional wisdom. It is said that until he actually made his final surge, Matoba had envisioned the scene of being overtaken by someone just before the finish line and had even prepared excuses in his mind. Matoba later stated, “That riding strategy was one I would absolutely never have chosen if Rice Shower had been in peak form. But if I had just ridden him safely, I think we would have finished no higher than a place. With that riding style, the probability of winning was slightly higher. We gambled on that one point and went for the win.”

==== Death at Takarazuka Kinen ====
Since Rice Shower had shown signs of fatigue after the Tenno Sho (Spring), sending him to pasture had been considered. However, he was voted first in the fan poll for the Takarazuka Kinen; furthermore, due to the Great Hanshin earthquake that occurred in January that year, the usual venue, Hanshin Racecourse, was unavailable, and the race was moved to Kyoto Racecourse. Additionally, it was decided that Narita Brian would not run in this race either following his absence from the Tenno Sho (Spring), so it was decided that Rice Shower would run. Additionally, he was able to race at 56 kg, an unexpectedly light weight compared to his recent races and there was also the fact that when his retirement to stud was reconsidered, it was concluded that a proven track record in middle-distance races was essential. On June 6, two days after the Takarazuka Kinen, a JRA official who had offered support for his retirement to stud was scheduled to come and watch Rice Shower.

On race day, he was the third favorite and ran from the back of the pack. Matoba reportedly sensed something was wrong as they rounded the first turn and thought, “There’s no way we’re winning today; let’s just get through this carefully.” At the third turn, Rice Shower accelerated on his own, but immediately afterward, he lurched forward; after briefly regaining his balance, he fell. He had suffered an open dislocation of the first phalanx of his left forefoot and a compound comminuted fracture of his left front cannon bone. The injury left him with no possibility of recovery, and since he could not even be safely transported to a veterinary clinic, he had to be euthanized on the track itself behind a curtain. Matoba, who had escaped with only bruises, was present to witness his final moments, and footage captures him bowing deeply as he watched the horse transport truck carry the body away from the track. Kawashima, his assigned groom, is said to have wept while clutching the reins.

== Memorial ==
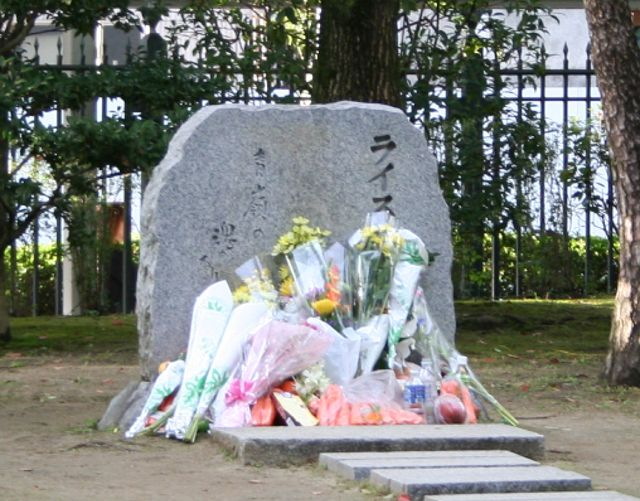
The Rice Shower Memorial at Kyoto Racecourse. It is inscribed with a verse composed by Ikuko Kuribayashi’s older sister: “The galloping horse becomes the soul of the blue mountains.”

On July 3, one month after his death, a grave was erected at Utopia Bokujo. The words “Rice Shower rests here” are engraved on the front, while his racing record is inscribed on the back. He was posthumously awarded the JRA Special Award at that year’s JRA Awards. Furthermore, at the suggestion of staff members at Kyoto Racecourse, a memorial containing a lock of Rice Shower’s hair was erected on the racecourse grounds on September 7, 1996. Additionally, at Daito Ranch where he was raised, there is a memorial erected by Hideo Kuribayashi and his wife, Ikuko. In addition, there is a monument at the Miho Training Center in Ibaraki Prefecture created by Yoshitsugu Iizuka, who had managed Rice Shower, and a memorial tower has been erected at Kurobane Springs in Ōtawara, Tochigi Prefecture.

While the horseshoes used by deceased horses are typically enshrined at the Horse-Headed Kannon statue at the training center, Iizuka was unable to do so specifically for Rice Shower’s horseshoes. Iizuka kept the horseshoes Rice Shower wore in the Takarazuka Kinen, preserved with soil from Kyoto Racecourse still attached.

The name of the “Kyoto Crown Premium” race held on the day of the 2010 Kikuka-sho was changed to the “Rice Shower Memorial” following a fan vote among past Kikuka Sho winners. On the day of the race, messages for Rice Shower were collected and placed at his grave at Utopia Farm after the race.

In 2021, Rice Shower placed fourth in an “Idol Horse Audition” held by Kyoto Racecourse, in which fans voted to create an “idol horse” based on a racehorse that had either never been produced before or, if produced in the past, was no longer available for sale.

== In popular culture ==
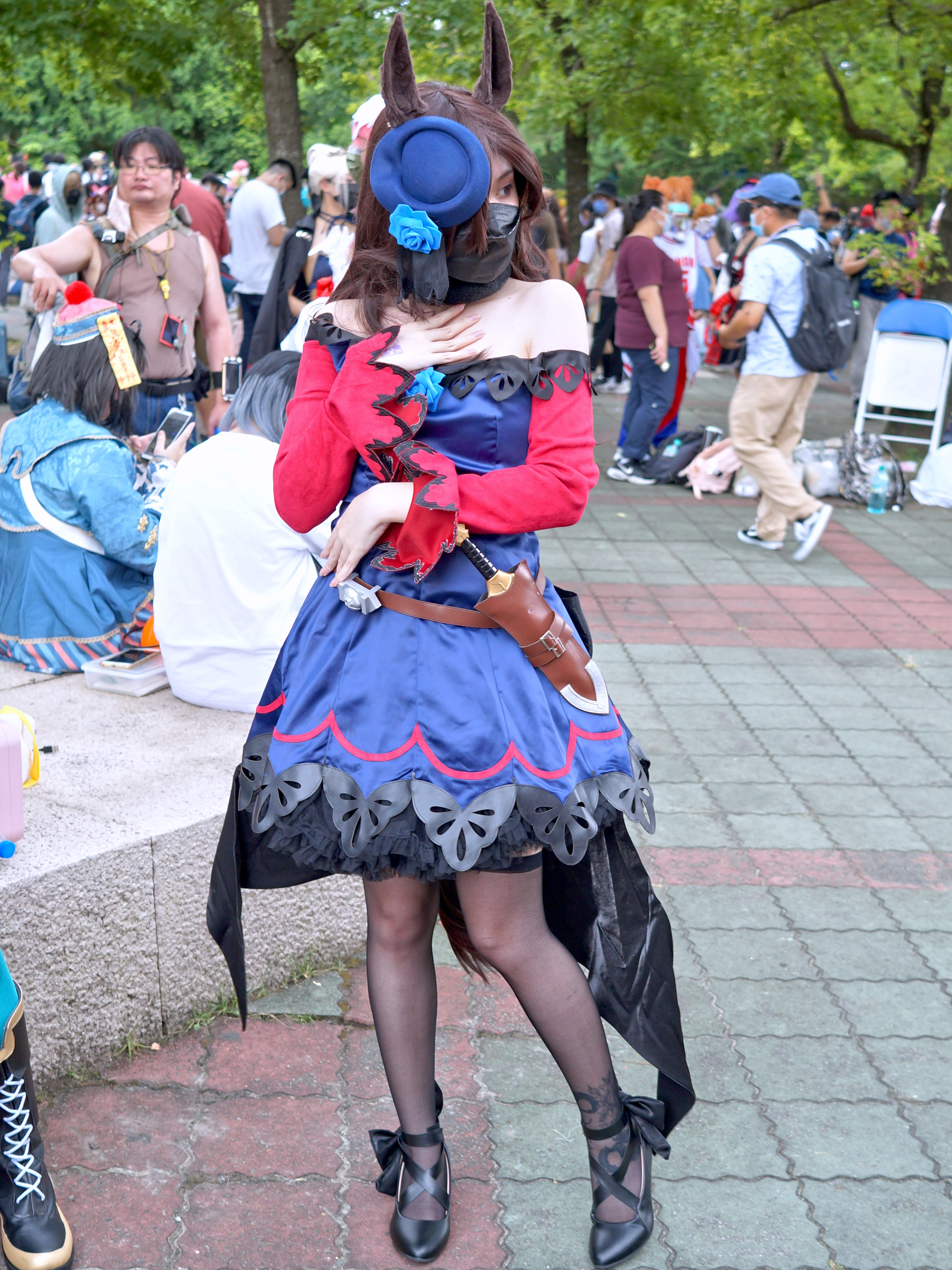
A cosplayer portraying Rice Shower from Umamusume: Pretty Derby.

An anthropomorphized version of Rice Shower appears as a character in the Japanese multimedia franchise Umamusume: Pretty Derby, voiced by Manaka Iwami. She is depicted as a shy, unlucky, and gloomy young woman who likes weddings and its associated motifs, as seen in her elegant racing outfit of a dark-colored bridal dress, bowler hat, and blue rose motif. Like her real-life counterpart, she is ridiculed by fans for stealing wins from Mejiro McQueen and Mihono Bourbon in the second season of the anime, but this attitude begins to change in later episodes. She is best friends with Haru Urara, whose real-life inspiration became internationally famous for her unbroken losing streak of more than a hundred races. Their relationship mirrors how Rice Shower was hated for winning races, but Haru Urara gained fans for losing instead.

== Racing record ==
The following racing form is based on information available on JBIS search and netkeiba.com.

Date	Age	Track	Race	Grade	Distance (Condition)	Entry	HN	Odds (Favored)	Finish	Time	Margins	Jockey	Winner (Runner-up)
Aug 10, 1991	2	Niigata	3YO debut		1000m（Firm）	10	8	3.1（2）	1st	0:58.6	−0.1	Takahiro Mizuno	(Daiichi Riyumon)
Sep 1, 1991	2	Niigata	Niigata Sansai Stakes	3	1200m（Firm）	14	1	4.3（3）	11th	1:11.7	1.0	Yasuo Sugawara	Uto Jane
Sep 21, 1991	2	Nakayama	Fuyo Stakes	OP	1600m（Soft）	8	8	3.7（2）	1st	1:36.1	0.0	Takahiro Mizuno	(Ararat San)
Mar 29, 1992	3	Nakayama	Fuji TV Sho Spring Stakes	2	1800m（Soft）	14	3	68.9（12）	4th	1:51.7	1.6	Masato Shibata	Mihono Bourbon
Apr 19, 1992	3	Nakayama	Satsuki Sho	1	2000m（Firm）	17	9	59.0（11）	8th	2:02.8	1.4	Hitoshi Matoba	Mihono Bourbon
May 10, 1992	3	Tokyo	NHK Hai	2	2000m（Soft）	16	15	25.0（9）	8th	2:03.4	0.6	Hitoshi Matoba	Narita Taisei
May 31, 1992	3	Tokyo	Tokyo Yushun	1	2400m（Good）	18	13	114.1（16）	2nd	2:28.5	0.7	Hitoshi Matoba	Mihono Bourbon
Sep 27, 1992	3	Nakayama	St. Lite Kinen	2	2200m（Firm）	13	14	6.5（3）	2nd	2:13.6	0.0	Katsuharu Tanaka	Legacy World
Oct 18, 1992	3	Kyoto	Kyoto Shimbun Hai	2	2200m（Firm）	10	1	7.1（2）	2nd	2:12.2	0.2	Hitoshi Matoba	Mihono Bourbon
Nov 8, 1992	3	Kyoto	Kikuka Sho	1	3000m（Firm）	18	8	7.3（2）	1st	R3:05.0	–0.2	Hitoshi Matoba	(Mihono Bourbon)
Dec 27, 1992	3	Nakayama	Arima Kinen	1	2500m（Firm）	16	16	4.9（2）	8th	2:34.1	0.6	Hitoshi Matoba	Mejiro Palmer
Feb 21, 1993	4	Tokyo	Meguro Kinen	2	2500m（Firm）	12	5	3.5（2）	2nd	2:32.8	0.4	Hitoshi Matoba	Matikanetannhauser
Mar 21, 1993	4	Nakayama	Nikkei Sho	2	2500m（Firm）	12	11	1.8（1）	1st	2:35.8	–0.4	Hitoshi Matoba	(Italian Color)
Apr 25, 1993	4	Kyoto	Tenno Sho (Spring)	1	3200m（Firm）	15	3	3.2（2）	1st	R3:17.1	–0.4	Hitoshi Matoba	(Mejiro McQueen)
Sep 19, 1993	4	Nakayama	Sankei Sho All Comers	3	2200m（Firm）	13	8	1.8（1）	3rd	2:13.6	1.0	Hitoshi Matoba	Twin Turbo
Oct 31, 1993	4	Tokyo	Tenno Sho (Autumn)	1	2000m（Firm）	17	1	3.0（1）	6th	1:59.6	0.7	Hitoshi Matoba	Yamanin Zephyr
Nov 28, 1993	4	Tokyo	Japan Cup	1	2400m（Firm）	16	1	12.8（7）	14th	2:25.9	1.5	Hitoshi Matoba	Legacy World
Dec 26, 1993	4	Nakayama	Arima Kinen	1	2500m（Firm）	14	6	10.9（5）	8th	2:32.1	1.2	Hitoshi Matoba	Tokai Teio
Feb 13, 1994	5	Hanshin	Kyoto Kinen	2	2200m（Good）	10	4	6.6（2）	5th	2:18.3	1.5	Hitoshi Matoba	Biwa Hayahide
Mar 20, 1994	5	Nakayama	Nikkei Sho	2	2500m（Firm）	9	6	4.1（2）	2nd	2:32.8	0.0	Hitoshi Matoba	Stage Champ
Dec 25, 1994	5	Nakayama	Arima Kinen	1	2500m（Firm）	13	10	17.7（4）	3rd	2:33.1	0.9	Hitoshi Matoba	Narita Brian
Feb 12, 1995	6	Kyoto	Kyoto Kinen	2	2200m（Firm）	8	8	2.7（1）	6th	2:12.5	0.7	Hitoshi Matoba	Wako Chikako
Mar 19, 1995	6	Nakayama	Nikkei Sho	2	2500m（Heavy）	9	1	1.9（1）	6th	2:42.3	1.3	Hitoshi Matoba	Inter Liner
Apr 23, 1995	6	Kyoto	Tenno Sho (Spring)	1	3200m（Soft）	18	3	5.8（4）	1st	3:19.9	0.0	Hitoshi Matoba	(Stage Champ)
Jun 4, 1995	6	Kyoto	Takarazuka Kinen	1	2200m（Good）	17	16	6.0（3）	DNF	–	–	Hitoshi Matoba	Dantsu Seattle

Legend:
Turf

- R on the time indicates that this was a record time

== Pedigree ==
Pedigree of Rice Shower (JPN), 1989
Sire Real Shadai (USA) 1979	Roberto (USA); 1969	Hail to Reason	Turn-To
Sire Real Shadai (USA) 1979	Roberto (USA); 1969	Hail to Reason	Nothirdchance
Sire Real Shadai (USA) 1979	Roberto (USA); 1969	Bramalea	Nashua
Sire Real Shadai (USA) 1979	Roberto (USA); 1969	Bramalea	Rarelea
Sire Real Shadai (USA) 1979	Desert Vixen (USA); 1970	In Reality	Intentionally
Sire Real Shadai (USA) 1979	Desert Vixen (USA); 1970	In Reality	My Dear Girl
Sire Real Shadai (USA) 1979	Desert Vixen (USA); 1970	Desert Trial	Moslem Chief
Sire Real Shadai (USA) 1979	Desert Vixen (USA); 1970	Desert Trial	Scotch Verdict
Dam Lilac Point (JPN) 1979	Maruzensky (JPN); 1974	Nijinsky	Northern Dancer
Dam Lilac Point (JPN) 1979	Maruzensky (JPN); 1974	Nijinsky	Flaming Page
Dam Lilac Point (JPN) 1979	Maruzensky (JPN); 1974	Shill	Buckpasser
Dam Lilac Point (JPN) 1979	Maruzensky (JPN); 1974	Shill	Quill
Dam Lilac Point (JPN) 1979	Kuri Katsura (JPN); 1962	Tiepolo	Blue Peter
Dam Lilac Point (JPN) 1979	Kuri Katsura (JPN); 1962	Tiepolo	Trevisana
Dam Lilac Point (JPN) 1979	Kuri Katsura (JPN); 1962	Kurino Hoshi	Primero
Dam Lilac Point (JPN) 1979	Kuri Katsura (JPN); 1962	Kurino Hoshi	Oho Hikari

== See also ==
- List of racehorses
