= JRA Special Award =

Award issued by the Japan Racing Association

The JRA Special Award is an award issued by the Japan Racing Association (JRA). Unlike most awards issued by the JRA, it is not awarded every year and is only awarded when there is a subject that deserves special recognition in a given year. While the main recipients are racehorses, it is occasionally awarded to individuals, such as in 2024, when Yutaka Take received the award for reaching 4,500 JRA wins in his jockey career. Equine recipients of the JRA Special Award must be selected by at least three-quarters of the selection committee and also must be approved by the chairman of the JRA, while human recipients are awarded only by the chairman of the JRA.

The predecessor of the Special Award was the Popularity Award, which was won by Haiseiko in 1973 when the JRA Awards were known as the Yūshun Awards. Later, in 1978, Ten Point received it as a Media Award, and Monte Prince in 1982 received the Dream Award. The name "Special Award" was first used when Amber Shadai was given the award in 1983. It was succeeded by the JRA Awards in 1987. In 2004, it was given the unique subtitle of "Special Fighting Award" when it was awarded to Cosmo Bulk.

== Recipients during the Yūshun Awards era ==
Year	Recipient	Sex	Age	Reason	Breeder	Trainer	Owner	Jockey(s)
1973	Haiseiko	Stallion	4	Responsible for the first horse racing boom in Japan, which became known as the "Haiseiko Boom" due to his popularity.	Takeda Ranch	Katsutaro Suzuki	Horseman Club	Sueo Masuzawa
1978	Ten Point	Stallion	6	In response to his death which was caused by a fracture during the Nihon Keizai Shinshun Hai. After fracturing his leg, Ten Point underwent 43 days of treatment before his death.	Yoshida Ranch	Sasuke Ogawa	Hisanari Takada	Akira Shikato
1982	Monte Prince	Stallion	6	Monte Prince became known as the "uncrowned emperor" due to him placing in the top three of four of Japan's Eight Major Races. In 1982, he won the Tennō Shō (Spring) and the Takarazuka Kinen, his first wins which were a part of the Eight Major Races.	Kineusu Saito Farm	Kichisaburo Matsuyama	Kihachi Mori	Masato Yoshinaga
1983	Amber Shadai	Stallion	7	In 1983, Amber Shadai won the Tennō Shō in his fifth try.	Shadai Farm	Toshio Nihonyanagi	Yoshida Yoshiya	Kazuhiro Kato

== Recipients since 1989 ==
=== Racehorses ===
Year	Recipient	Sex	Age	Reason	Breeder	Trainer	Owner	Jockey(s)
1989	Oguri Cap	Stallion	5	A week after winning the Mile Championship, Oguri Cap came second in the Japan Cup with a time equal to the world record, and the race record.	Inaba Bokujo	Tsutomu Setoguchi	Toshinori Kondo	Katsumi Minami
1993	Tokai Teio	Stallion	6	In 1993, Tokai Teio won the Arima Kinen, after a 364 day hiatus. Due to suffering from impairments such as fractures, parasites and injuries to the gluteus medius.	Nagahama Ranch	Shoichi Matsumoto	Masanori Uchimura	Seiki Tabara
1995	Rice Shower	Stallion	7	In 1995, Rice shower won the Tennō Shō after disappointing race performances for the last two years. However, in his next race, the Takarazuka Kinen, he dislocated his first left knuckle and suffered a communited fracture during the race and had to be euthanised behind a curtain on the track itself.	Utopia Ranch	Koji Iizuka	Hideo Kuriyabashi	Hitoshi Matoba
1998	Silence Suzuka	Stallion	5	Silence Suzuka won six consecutive races until he was injured and had to be euthanised in the Autumn Tennō Shō.	Inahara Farm	Mitsuru Hashida	Keiji Nagai	Yutaka Take
1999	Grass Wonder	Stallion	5	In 1999, Grass Wonder won both Grand Prix races (the Arima Kinen and Takarazuka Kinen).	Philip Slacing Partnership & John Phillips	Mitsuhiro Ogata	Hanzawa Co., Ltd.	Hitoshi Matoba
1999	Special Week	Stallion	5	Special Week won both Tennō Shōs (Spring and Autumn) in 1999.	Hidaka Taiyo Farm	Toshiaki Shirai	Hiroyoshi Usuda	Yutaka Take
2001	Stay Gold	Stallion	7	Stay Gold was the first Japanese bred racehorse to win an overseas G1 race (the Hong Kong Vase).	Shiraoi Farm	Yasuro Ikee	Shadai Racehorse Co.	Yutaka Take
2004	Cosmo Bulk	Stallion	3	Despite being an NAR horse, Cosmo Bulk ran well in JRA races such as the Satsuki Shō and the Japan Cup, finishing second in both races.	Kano Ranch	Kazunori Tabe	Misako Okada	Fuyuki Igarashi
2007	Vodka	Mare	3	Vodka was the first mare to win the Japanese Derby in 64 years.	Country Ranch	Katsuhiko Sumii	Yuzo Tanimizu	Hirofumi Shii
2007	Meisho Samson	Stallion	4	Meisho Samson won both Tennō Shōs in 2007.	Hayashi Koki Farm	Shigetada Takahashi	Yoshio Matsumoto	Yutaka Take Mamoru Ishibashi
2009	Company	Stallion	8	Company was the first 8-year-old horse to win a G1 flat race in Japan.	Northern Farm	Hidetaka Otonashi	Eiko Kondo	Norihiro Yokoyama
2016	Maurice	Stallion	5	Maurice achieved three G1 victories in 2016, with two of these being in Hong Kong.	Togawa Ranch	Noriyuki Hori	Kazumi Yoshida	João Moreira Ryan Moore
2020	Chrono Genesis	Mare	4	Chrono Genesis won both Grand Prix races in 2020.	Northern Farm	Takashi Saito	Sunday Racing Co., Ltd.	Yuichi Kitamura
2023	Ushba Tesoro	Stallion	6	Ushba Tesoro was the second Japanese horse to win the Dubai World Cup (the first one on dirt surface).	Chiyoda Farm	Noboru Takagi	Ryotokuji Kenji Holdings Co., Ltd.	Kazuo Yokoyama Yuga Kawada
2024	Forever Young	Stallion	3	In 2024, Forever Young won four graded races in Japan and internationally, and came third in the 2024 Kentucky Derby and Breeders' Cup Classic.	Northern Farm	Yoshito Yahagi	Susuma Fujita	Ryusei Sakai
2025	Calandagan	Gelding	4	In 2025, Calandagan was the first foreign horse to win the Japan Cup in 20 years.	Aga Khan Studs Scea	Francis-Henri Graffard	Aga Khan IV	Mickael Barzalona

=== Jockeys and trainers ===
Year	Recipient	Profession	Reason
1994	Katsumi Minami	Jockey	Minami was the first jockey to win five G1 races in one year.
2007	Yutaka Take	Jockey	Take was the first Japanese jockey to win 3,000 races in his career.
2013	Yutaka Take	Jockey	Take was the first Japanese jockey to win 3,500 races and 100 G1 races in his career.
2016	Shigefumi Kumazawa	Jockey	Kumazawa was active in both flat and steeplechase racing for many years.
2018	Yutaka Take	Jockey	Take was the first Japanese jockey to win 4,000 races in his career.
2020	Kazuo Fujisawa	Trainer	Fujisawa was the second trainer in history to achieve 1,500 wins in JRA races.
2022	Yoshitomi Shibata	Jockey	Shibata was the first active JRA jockey to receive the Medal with Yellow Ribbon for his contributions to JRA horse racing and the livestock industry.
2024	Yutaka Take	Jockey	In 2024, Take was the second active JRA jockey to receive the Medal with Yellow Ribbon and became the first jockey in Japan to achieve 4,500 career wins.
2025	Norihiro Yokoyama	Jockey	Yokoyama was the third active JRA jockey to receive the Medal with Yellow Ribbon.
