= Mihono Bourbon =

Japanese-bred Thoroughbred racehorse

Mihono Bourbon ミホノブルボン
- Mihono Bourbon at the 1992 Spring Stakes.
- Breed: Thoroughbred
- Sire: Magnitude
- Grandsire: Mill Reef
- Dam: Katsumi Echo
- Damsire: Chalet
- Sex: Stallion
- Foaled: April 25, 1989
- Died: February 22, 2017 (aged 27)
- Country: Japan
- Colour: Chestnut
- Breeder: Keiji Haraguchi
- Owner: Miura Shoji Co., Ltd.
- Racing colors
- Trainer: Tameo Toyama; Akio Tsurudome; Shigeki Matsumoto
- Jockey: Sadahiro Kojima
- Record: 8: 7-1-0
- Earnings: ¥525,969,800

Major wins
- Asahi Hai Sansai Stakes (1991); Fuji TV Sho Spring Stakes (1992); Kyoto Shimbun Hai (1992); Japanese Classic Race wins: Satsuki Shō (1992); Tōkyō Yūshun (1992)

Awards
- Japanese Champion Two-Year-Old Colt (1991); Japanese Horse of the Year (1992); Japanese Champion Three-Year-Old Colt (1992)

Mihono Bourbon (Japanese: ミホノブルボン, Hepburn: Mihono Burubon; 25 April 1989 – 22 February 2017) was a Japanese Thoroughbred racehorse. Mihono Bourbon was highly successful, winning seven of his eight races and putting up a major challenge for the Japanese Triple Crown in 1992, winning the first two races undefeated before finally losing to Rice Shower in the Kikuka-shō. Injuries curtailed Mihono Bourbon's career, and he did not race again after his three-year-old season. Due to his seemingly machine-like ability to handle slopes and maintain his position as a front-runner in races, he received the nicknames "Cyborg" and "Chestnut Super Express." Mihono Bourbon received multiple JRA awards, including being voted Japanese Horse of the Year in 1992 and the champion two-year-old and three-year-old colt in 1991 and 1992, respectively.

== Background ==
Mihono Bourbon was foaled 25 April 1989 at Haraguchi Farm. He was sold to horse-owner Miura Shoji, who named the horse after the Bourbon dynasty that ruled France in the 16th century. In April 1991, when Mihono Bourbon became old enough, he was transferred to the Ritto Training Center, where he was assigned trainer Tameo Toyama. Toyama was known for intense training methods using sloped tracks. Toyama assigned this training method along with a specialty diet to Mihono Bourbon. Training assistants noted that during this period, Mihono Bourbon disliked people approaching during meals and preferred to remain alone.

== Racing career ==
=== 1991: two-year-old season ===
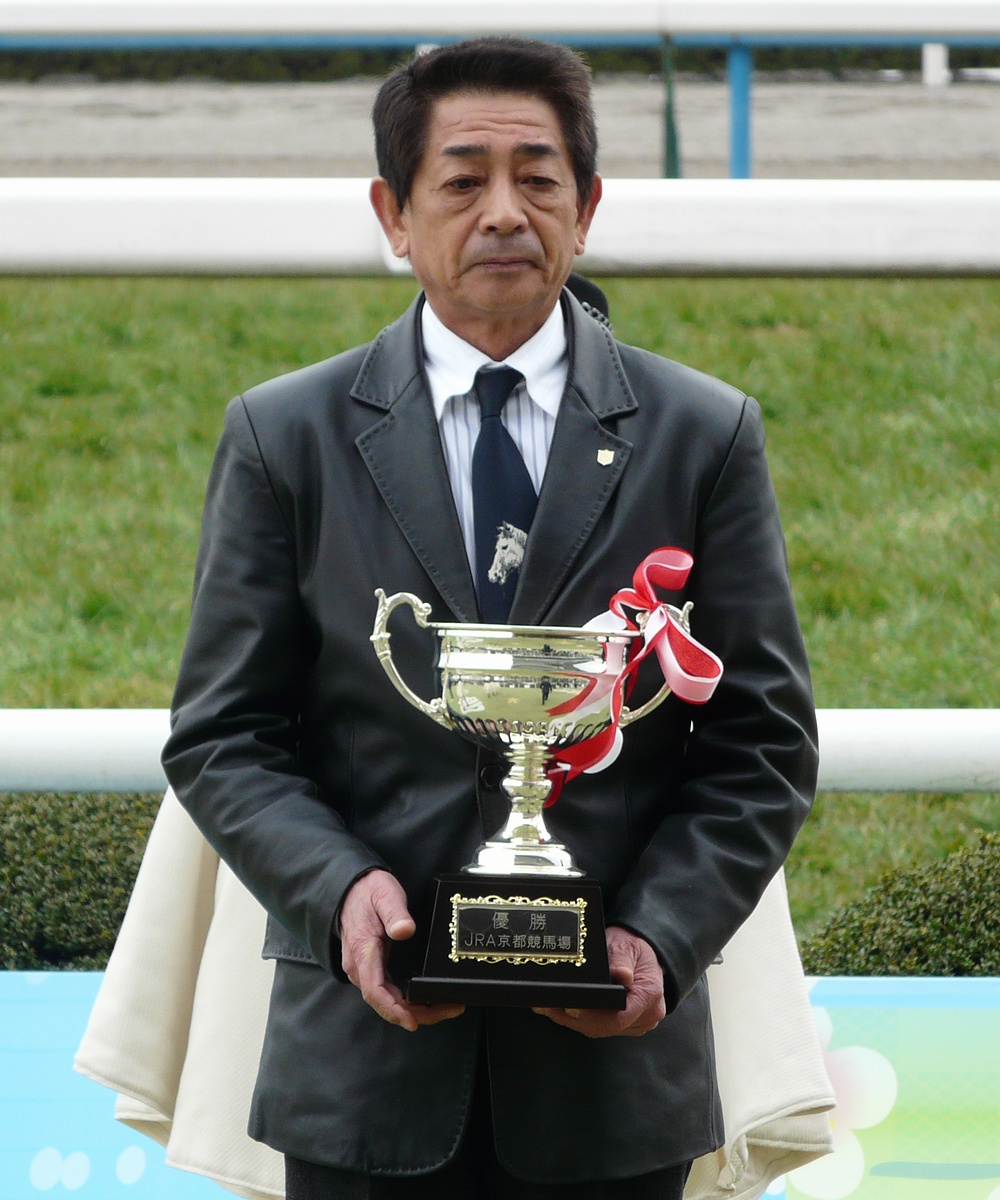
Mihono Bourbon's jockey Sadahiro Kojima (in 2012)

Mihono Bourbon made his racing debut at Chukyo Racecourse in September 1991. In his debut, Mihono Bourbon won while setting a new course record for two-year-olds over 1000 meters. He was rested for roughly two months after this race due to periostitis. He returned for a two-year-old open race at Tokyo Racecourse at the end of November, where he won by a margin of six lengths. Two weeks later, in early December, Mihono Bourbon was entered in to the Asahi Hai Futurity Stakes at Nakayama Racecourse, his first major graded stakes race and his first grade 1 event. Mihono Bourbon was the favorite entering the race. In the race, Mihono Bourbon was stayed at the front the whole race, but was nearly caught in the final straight by Yamanin Miracle. The two crossed side-by-side, but Mihono Bourbon held on to take victory and remained undefeated.

At the end of the year, Mihono Bourbon was voted Best Two-Year-Old Colt at the JRA Awards, receiving 174 out of 176 votes.

=== 1992: three-year-old season ===
Mihono Bourbon's 1992 season was scheduled to begin at the Shinzan Kinen, but after he suffered a sprain during training, this race was skipped, and he was instead entered in to the Spring Stakes as preparation for the Triple Crown. This race was 200 meters longer than any race the horse had previously done, and his trainer stated that if Mihono Bourbon did not perform well here, he would be withdrawn from the Triple Crown and instead focused on shorter-distance races. With some doubts existing about the horse's aptitude at longer distance, he was only second favorite behind Northern Conduct. These doubts were erased during the race, as Mihono Bourbon led the full distance and pull even further ahead in the final straight, eventually winning by seven lengths. After the race, sportswriter Toshinori Ishida writing for Sankei Sports coined the nickname "Chestnut Super Express" for Mihono Bourbon.

Mihono Bourbon's next race was the Satsuki Shō, the first leg of the Triple Crown. He was the favorite for the race, with any doubts about his ability at longer races ended by his previous performance. The pace of the race was faster than what was favorable for Mihono Bourbon, but he was still unable to be caught, and won by 2 1/2 lengths over Narita Taisei. The victory was the first in any of the Triple Crown races for jockey Sadahiro Kojima.

In preparation for the Tōkyō Yūshun, Mihono Bourbon's trainer increased his training regimen with more slope training than usual, but had to back off after the horse became exhausted and also developed an injury the required two days of pool work to help heal. He was back in racing form by the Tōkyō Yūshun, and once again entered as the favorite. In the race, Mihono Bourbon led nearly the entire distance and opened a gap on the final straight to take victory by four lengths over Rice Shower. Mihono Bourbon was only the eighth horse in history to win the Tōkyō Yūshun while undefeated, and only the fifth to take two of the three Triple Crown races while undefeated, following Tokai Teio who had accomplished the same the previous year.

After a break for training over the summer, Mihono Bourbon returned to racing at the Kyoto Shimbun Hai in October to prepare for the final leg of the triple crown. Despite the race being only at Grade 2 level, it saw large attendance as fans tried to watch the potential Triple Crown racing horse. Mihono Bourbon took victory again, defeating Rice Shower by 1 1/2 lengths and setting a new record time for 2200 meter races.

Mihono Bourbon was then entered in to the Kikuka-shō, the final leg of the Triple Crown, with the potential to become a Triple Crown winner. Mihono Bourbon was the overwhelming favorite to win. With a potential Triple Crown winner possible, the Kikuka-shō saw an attendance of over 12,000 spectators. In the race, Kyoei Bowgun was allowed to lead much of the race before Mihono Bourbon was spurred forward to take the lead on the final stretch. However, with only 100 meters to go, Rice Shower made a charge on the outside and passed Mihono Bourbon, taking the victory by 1 1/4 length and denying Mihono Bourbon the Triple Crown victory. It was Mihono Bourbon's only loss.

=== Injuries and retirement from racing ===
The Kikuka-shō would turn out to be Mihono Bourbon's final race, as injuries would plague him for the rest of his youth. During training for the Japan Cup, Mihono Bourbon developed a limp in his right-hind leg, which cancelled plans to race in both the Japan Cup and the Arima Kinen. Despite the early end to his 1992 season, Mihono Bourbon was voted as both Japanese Horse of the Year and as Best Three-Year-Old Colt.

Further injuries prevented Mihono Bourbon from making a comeback as a four-year-old. In January, he developed periostitis in his right hind leg. Mihono Bourbon was rested, but in April, he suffered a fracture in his right-hind leg. In May, Mihono Bourbon's trainer Tameo Toyama died. He was briefly transferred to the care of Toyama's successor Akio Tsurudome, before being passed to another trainer, Hideyuki Mori. Mori had Mihono Bourbon taken to the Japan Racehorse Research Institute in Iwaki, Fukushima, which had a hot spring facility for horses to use for rehabilitation from injury. Despite the efforts to return Mihono Bourbon to racing, he ultimately was unable to fully recover, and his retirement was finally announced on 6 January 1994. A retirement ceremony was held at Tokyo Racecourse on 6 February.

== Retirement ==
Mihono Bourbon was retired to stud at the Hidaka Light Horse Farming Cooperative in Hidaka, Hokkaido. While his progeny was somewhat successful at the local level of horse racing, Mihono Bourbon never produced any offspring that challenged for national level events. Mihono Bourbon eventually returned to the Haraguchi Farm where he had been born to stand as stud, but was primarily bred with the farm's own mares. In 2012, Mihono Bourbon was retired from stud, and was sent to live the remainder of his life at Smile Farm, run by Keiji Haraguchi's son-in-law. Among Mihono Bourbon's most successful offspring by career earnings were Miyashiro Bourbon, Oriental City, and Young One Gambo.

Mihono Bourbon remained popular after his retirement. In 1996, he appeared in a television commercial for the JRA with actress Mayu Tsuruta riding him. In 2000, the JRA held an event entitled "Dream Horses 2000," where fans could vote for which horses they thought the most famous of the 20th century. Mihono Bourbon was ranked 17th in the fan vote out of the top 100 announced horses. In 2004, as part of the JRA's 50th anniversary celebrations, a race was held at the Chukyo Racecourse titled the "Mihono Bourbon Memorial" in his honor.

Mihono Bourbon fell ill in February 2017. On 21 February, he became unable to stand, and he died in the evening the following day, 22 February 2017, at age 27.

== In popular culture ==
An anthropomorphized version of Mihono Bourbon appears as a character in the Japanese multimedia franchise Umamusume: Pretty Derby, voiced by Ikumi Hasegawa. She is depicted as a girl with a robotic and largely emotionless demeanor, which earned her the nickname "Cyborg" much like her real-world counterpart. However, she opens up emotionally to close friends, among them Rice Shower. She loves science fiction and styled her racewear with futuristic aesthetics in mind, but ironically also has a reputation for shorting out any and all electronic devices she comes into direct contact with, and as such is banned from using Tracen Academy's vending machines and her family is forced to live an analog lifestyle.

== Racing record ==
Mihono Bourbon ran eight career races, winning all but his final start, where he finished second.

Date	Age	Race	Grade	Distance (condition)	Track	Finish	Time	Winning (Losing) Margin	Field	Jockey	1st Place (2nd Place)
Sep 7, 1991	2	Two Year Old Newcomers		1000m (Firm)	Chukyo	1st	R0:58.1	1¼ lengths	13	Sadahiro Kojima	(Hoei Seiko)
Nov 23, 1991	2	Two Year Old 5,000,000 & Less		1600m (Firm)	Tokyo	1st	1:35.1	6 lengths	11	Sadahiro Kojima	(Kuri Try)
Dec 8, 1991	2	Asahi Hai Sansai Stakes	G1	1600m (Firm)	Nakayama	1st	1:34.5	nose	8	Sadahiro Kojima	(Yamanin Miracle)
Mar 29, 1992	3	Fuji TV Sho Spring Stakes	G2	1800m (Soft)	Nakayama	1st	1:50.1	7 lengths	14	Sadahiro Kojima	(Mermaid Tavern)
Apr 19, 1992	3	Satsuki Shō	G1	2000m (Firm)	Nakayama	1st	2:01.4	2½ lengths	17	Sadahiro Kojima	(Narita Taisei)
May 31, 1992	3	Tōkyō Yūshun	G1	2400m (Good)	Tokyo	1st	2:27.8	4 lengths	18	Sadahiro Kojima	(Rice Shower)
Oct 18, 1992	3	Kyoto Shimbun Hai	G2	2200m (Firm)	Kyoto	1st	R2:12.0	1½ lengths	10	Sadahiro Kojima	(Rice Shower)
Nov 8, 1992	3	Kikuka-shō	G1	3000m (Firm)	Kyoto	2nd	3:05.2	(1¼ lengths)	18	Sadahiro Kojima	Rice Shower

== Pedigree ==
Pedigree of Mihono Bourbon (JPN), chestnut, 1989
Sire Magnitude (IRE) 1975	Mill Reef (USA); 1968	Never Bend (USA); 1960	Nasrullah (GBR); 1940
Sire Magnitude (IRE) 1975	Mill Reef (USA); 1968	Never Bend (USA); 1960	Lalun (USA); 1952
Sire Magnitude (IRE) 1975	Mill Reef (USA); 1968	Milan Mill (USA); 1962	Princequillo (IRE); 1940
Sire Magnitude (IRE) 1975	Mill Reef (USA); 1968	Milan Mill (USA); 1962	Virginia Water (USA); 1953
Sire Magnitude (IRE) 1975	Altesse Royale (IRE); 1968	Saint Crespin (GBR); 1956	Aureole (GBR); 1950
Sire Magnitude (IRE) 1975	Altesse Royale (IRE); 1968	Saint Crespin (GBR); 1956	Neocracy (GBR); 1944
Sire Magnitude (IRE) 1975	Altesse Royale (IRE); 1968	Bleu Azur (GBR); 1959	Crepello (GBR); 1954
Sire Magnitude (IRE) 1975	Altesse Royale (IRE); 1968	Bleu Azur (GBR); 1959	Blue Prelude (GBR); 1951
Dam Katsumi Echo (JPN) 1983	Chalet (FRA); 1976	Luthier (FRA); 1965	Klairon (FRA); 1952
Dam Katsumi Echo (JPN) 1983	Chalet (FRA); 1976	Luthier (FRA); 1965	Flute Enchantee (FRA); 1950
Dam Katsumi Echo (JPN) 1983	Chalet (FRA); 1976	Christiana (GBR); 1967	Double Jump (GBR); 1962
Dam Katsumi Echo (JPN) 1983	Chalet (FRA); 1976	Christiana (GBR); 1967	Mount Rosa (GBR); 1957
Dam Katsumi Echo (JPN) 1983	High Flame (JPN); 1968	Your Highness (GBR); 1958	Chamossaire (GBR); 1942
Dam Katsumi Echo (JPN) 1983	High Flame (JPN); 1968	Your Highness (GBR); 1958	Lady Grand (GBR); 1943
Dam Katsumi Echo (JPN) 1983	High Flame (JPN); 1968	Kami Yamato (JPN); 1959	Rising Flame (IRE); 1947
Dam Katsumi Echo (JPN) 1983	High Flame (JPN); 1968	Kami Yamato (JPN); 1959	Corona (JPN) (Family:11-c); 1943
