= Tokai Teio =

Japanese thoroughbred racehorse

Tokai Teio トウカイテイオー
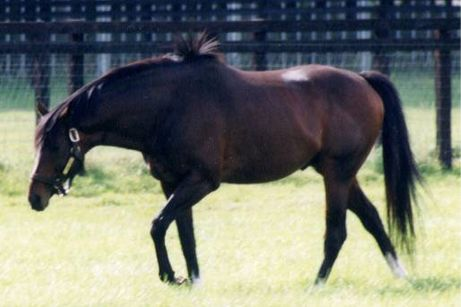
- Tokai Teio in retirement.
- Breed: Thoroughbred
- Sire: Symboli Rudolf (JPN)
- Grandsire: Partholon (IRE)
- Dam: Tokai Natural (JPN)
- Damsire: Nice Dancer (CAN)
- Sex: Stallion
- Foaled: April 20, 1988
- Died: August 30, 2013 (aged 25)
- Country: Japan
- Colour: Bay
- Breeder: Nagahama Farm
- Owner: Masanori Uchimura
- Racing colours
- Trainer: Shouichi Matsumoto
- Jockey: Takayuki Yasuda; Yukio Okabe; Seiki Tabara
- Record: 12: 9-0-0
- Earnings: ¥625,633,500

Major wins
- Sankei Ōsaka Hai (1992); Japan Cup (1992); Arima Kinen (1993); Japanese Classic Race wins: Satsuki Sho (1991); Tokyo Yushun (1991)

Awards
- Japanese Horse of the Year (1991); JRA Award for Best Three-Year-Old Colt (1991); Best Horse By Home-bred Sire (1991); JRA Special Award (1993)

Honours
- Japan Racing Association Hall of Fame (1995)

Tokai Teio (Japanese: トウカイテイオー, Hepburn: Toukai Teiō; April 20, 1988 – August 30, 2013) was a champion Japanese Thoroughbred racehorse and sire. In 1991, he won the Satsuki Sho and the Tokyo Yushun, and was the 1991 Japanese Horse of the Year. He then won the 1992 Japan Cup where champion horses like the European Horse of the Year and the Australian Champion Racehorse of the Year participated. After being sidelined with a leg injury for a whole year (364 days), he won the Arima Kinen in 1993. Tokai Teio was inducted into the Japan Racing Association Hall of Fame in 1995.

== Background ==
Tokai Teio was a bay horse bred by Masanori Uchimura. He was from the first crop of foals sired by triple crown winner Symboli Rudolf. His dam Tokai Natural was an unraced daughter of Nice Dancer and a half-sister to Yushun Himba winner Tokai Roman who became a broodmare due to foot problems. Both mares descend from the pre-war Tokyo Yushun winner Hisatomo.

Masanori Uchimura initially planned to breed Tokai Roman, who was supposed to retire after the Niigata Daishoten to Symboli Rudolf. After finishing the race second, it was decided that she would race for another year. Tokai Natural was bred with Symboli Rudolf instead. (Note: Tokai Roman retired in 1988 and bred with Symboli Rudolf, producing the colt Tokai Thames, who retired without winning.)

Tokai Teio was foaled on April 20, 1988, at the Nagahama Ranch in Niikappu, Hokkaido. Immediately after birth, he was referred to as「帝王」"Teio", meaning monarch, referring to his sire Symboli Rudolf's nickname「皇帝」"Koutei", meaning emperor. Thus, the foal was named Hamano Teio. Teio had long legs and a delicate frame and did not receive high valuations. However, once he started exercising, his flexible movement became apparent, garnering expectations. In October the following year, Teio was transferred to the Nibutani Training Center in Biratori, Hokkaido where his flexibility and competitive spirit was highly received. Teio would remain at Nibutani for an entire year until reaching the racing age of 3 years in October 1990, after which he entered the Rittō Training Center in Rittō, Shiga under trainer Shoichi Matsumoto. Teio's racing name was registered as Tokai Teio.

During training, Tokai Teio was outstanding on the ramp course where horses with long strides are not supposed to record good times, giving Matsumoto high expectations. Believing Teio to have a chance in the Japanese Triple Crown, Matsumoto backcalculated from the Satsuki Shō and Tokyo Yūshun and planned a schedule with leeway. Furthermore, Teio's farrier was surprised at the flexibility of his joints, (Note: 「繋」vaguely means "connection", interpreted at "joints") saying to his groom that "the derby horse has arrived".

== Racing career ==
=== 1990: two-year-old-season ===
Tokai Teio made his debut in a 1800-meter maiden race on 1 December at the Chukyo Racecourse, which was selected to simulate a left-handed track similar to the Tokyo Racecourse. Ridden by Takayuki Yasada, who had ridden Teio in pre-race training along with other horses trained by Matsumoto, Tokai Teio was the favorite to win the race after its performance in training. Despite a tight course that favored front-runners, Tokai Teio started at the end of the pack and gradually made his way to the inside towards the front on the final straight, where he would win by four lengths. After his debut race win, he was registered for the open-grade 2,000-meter Cyclamen Stakes at the Kyoto Racecourse on 23 December. As the third-ranked favorite, Tokai Teio again was at the back of the pack to start the race. He went on to gradually go to the front, overtaking first-ranked favorite Iide Satan on the fourth corner and holding the lead to win the race by 2 lengths.

=== 1991: three-year-old season ===
Tokai Teio's began his three-year-old season by winning the 2,000-meter Wakagoma Stakes. He followed it with a victory in the 2,000-meter Wakaba stakes.

==== Satsuki Shō ====
Tokai Teio entered the Satsuki Shō as the favorite with the odds of 2.1. He broke from post position 18, initially took the lead on the outside then settling in the 7th and 8th place. He then moved forward at the third corner and took the lead in the homestretch, winning by a length over Shako Grade.

==== Tōkyō Yūshun (Japanese Derby) ====
Undefeated from 5 starts, Tokai Teio entered the Tōkyō Yūshun as the favorite with the odds of 1.6. He broke from post position 20, initially settling in the 6th position, he then broke out of the field from the far outside and took the lead in the homestretch, winning by three lengths over Leo Durban.

Three days after the race, a fracture was found in his left hind leg which required a full recovery period of six months. This prevented him from entering in the Kikuka Sho, denying him from completing the Triple Crown.

=== 1992: four-year-old season ===
He made his comeback at the Sankei Osaka Hai in April, ten months after his injury at the Tokyo Yushun. In this race, he managed to extend his win streak to seven as he won this race comfortably with his new jockey, Yukio Okabe did not need to use his whip. This good preparation set up a battle of the century with a horse who was the defending champion of the Tenno Sho (Spring), Mejiro McQueen, jockeyed by Yutaka Take. In this race, both horses actually had a good run until the final corner, when Tokai Teio struggled to hold the ground; Mejiro McQueen launched his final acceleration in the straight to win the race whilst Tokai Teio finished in fifth. Ten days after the race, he was diagnosed with a second fracture of his career in his left foreleg that would subsided him for several months.

The horse made a comeback in the Tenno Sho (Autumn) in October. Despite mostly running on the front group at all corners, he faded out in the homestretch and only came home in seventh behind Let's Go Tarquin. After the race, Okabe commented, "Since he fractured his leg twice, it might be unreasonable to expect him to have the same leg he had at age four." Despite that suspicious remark by the jockey, Tokai Teio proved otherwise in his next race, the Japan Cup. As the fifth favourite, he moved to the outside track from the middle pack, dueled with the Oceanian's ace, Naturalism in the straight, and came up as the winner by a neck on the line. He ended up his season with a run at the Arima Kinen, in which he was unfit, slipped his hindquarters at the starting gate, ran mostly at the back and suffered a crushing defeat by finishing in 11th.

=== 1993: five-year-old season ===
He was diagnosed with a back injury after the Arima Kinen, which caused him to miss the first half of the spring season. His comeback was scheduled for the Takarazuka Kinen, but his left foreleg was found to have suffered a third fracture, and his return was postponed again. He eventually made a comeback at the Arima Kinen, having not raced in 364 days since the Previous year's Arima Kinen.

Normally, having a third fracture usually was a death sentence for the horseracing career. For the second time in his career, Tokai Teio proved otherwise, as he settled calmly in the middle pack before making a surging late run to overtake the favourite Biwa Hayahide in the homestretch and win his fourth G1 title by half a length. The race came to be known as the "Miracle Run", after the announcer's memorable call of Teio's final surge:

"Tokai Teio is coming! Tokai Teio is coming! Tokai Teio is coming! Tokai Teio! A miraculous comeback!"

He was scheduled to continue racing the next year. but he suffered a fourth fracture in his left foreleg, leading to his retirement. His retirement ceremony was held on 23 October 1994 at Tokyo Racecourse.

== Honours ==
- 1991 Japanese Horse of the Year
- 1991 JRA Award for Best Three-Year-Old Colt
- 1991 JRA Award for Best Horse By Home-bred Sire
- 1993 JRA Special Award

Tokai Teio was inducted as the 23rd member of the Japan Racing Association Hall of Fame in 1995.

== Stud career ==
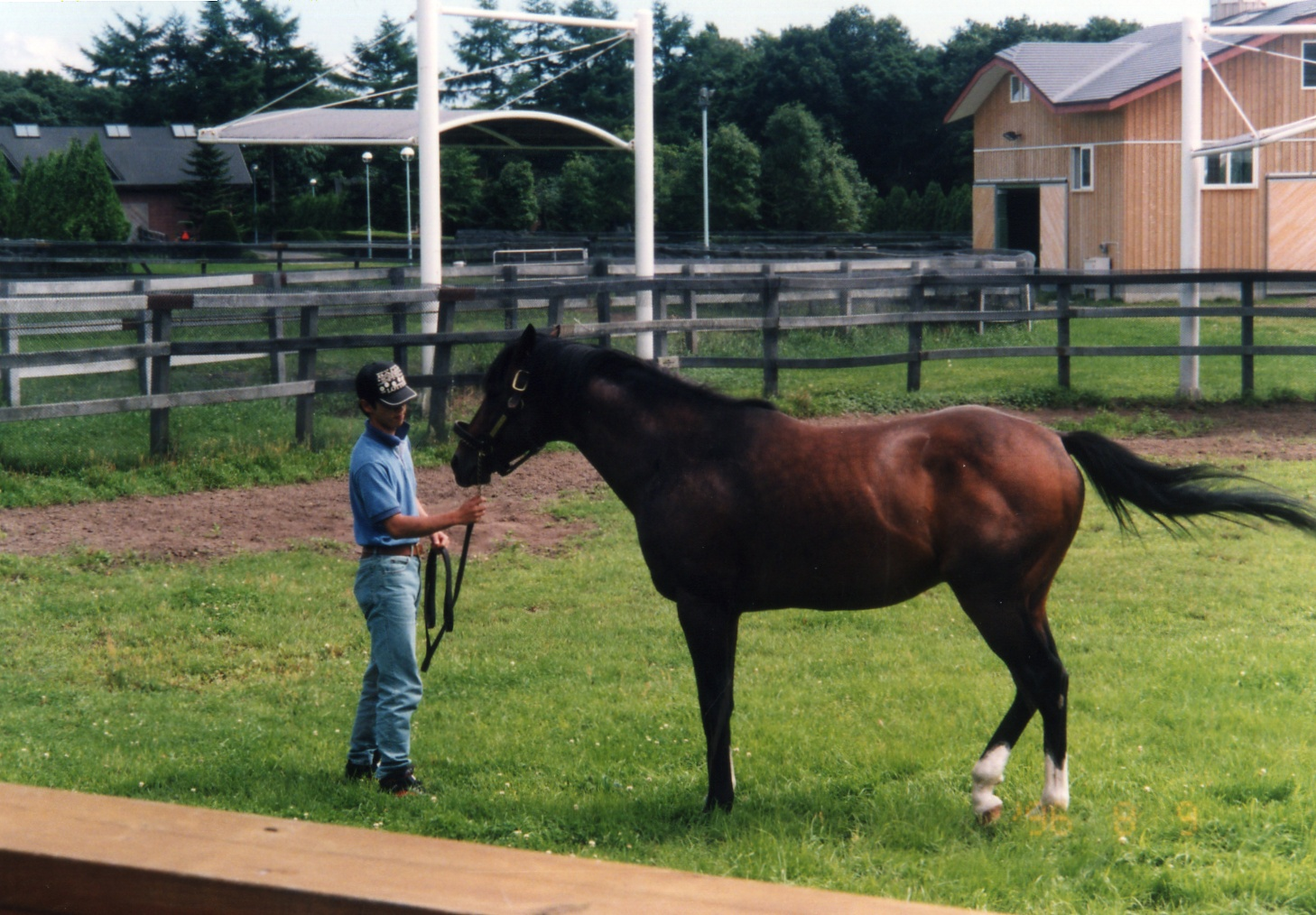
Tokai Teio with his stablehand in his retirement years

Following his retirement from racing in October 1994, Tokai Teio was sent to Shadai Stallion Station where he assumed stud duties. His notable descendants include:

=== Notable progeny ===
c = colt, f = filly, g= gelding
Bold = G1/Jpn1 stakes

| Foaled | Name | Sex | Major Wins |
|---|---|---|---|
| 1996 | Taiki Polar | f | Mermaid Stakes |
| 1996 | Tokai Point | g | Nakayama Kinen, **Mile Championship** |
| 1996 | Tokai Pulsar | c | Aichi Hai |
| 1999 | Strong Blood | c | Kabutoyama Kinen, Sakurambo Kinen, Gunma Kinen, **Kashiwa Kinen** |
| 2001 | Yamanin Sucre | f | **Hanshin Juvenile Fillies**, Nakayama Himba Stakes |

== Death ==
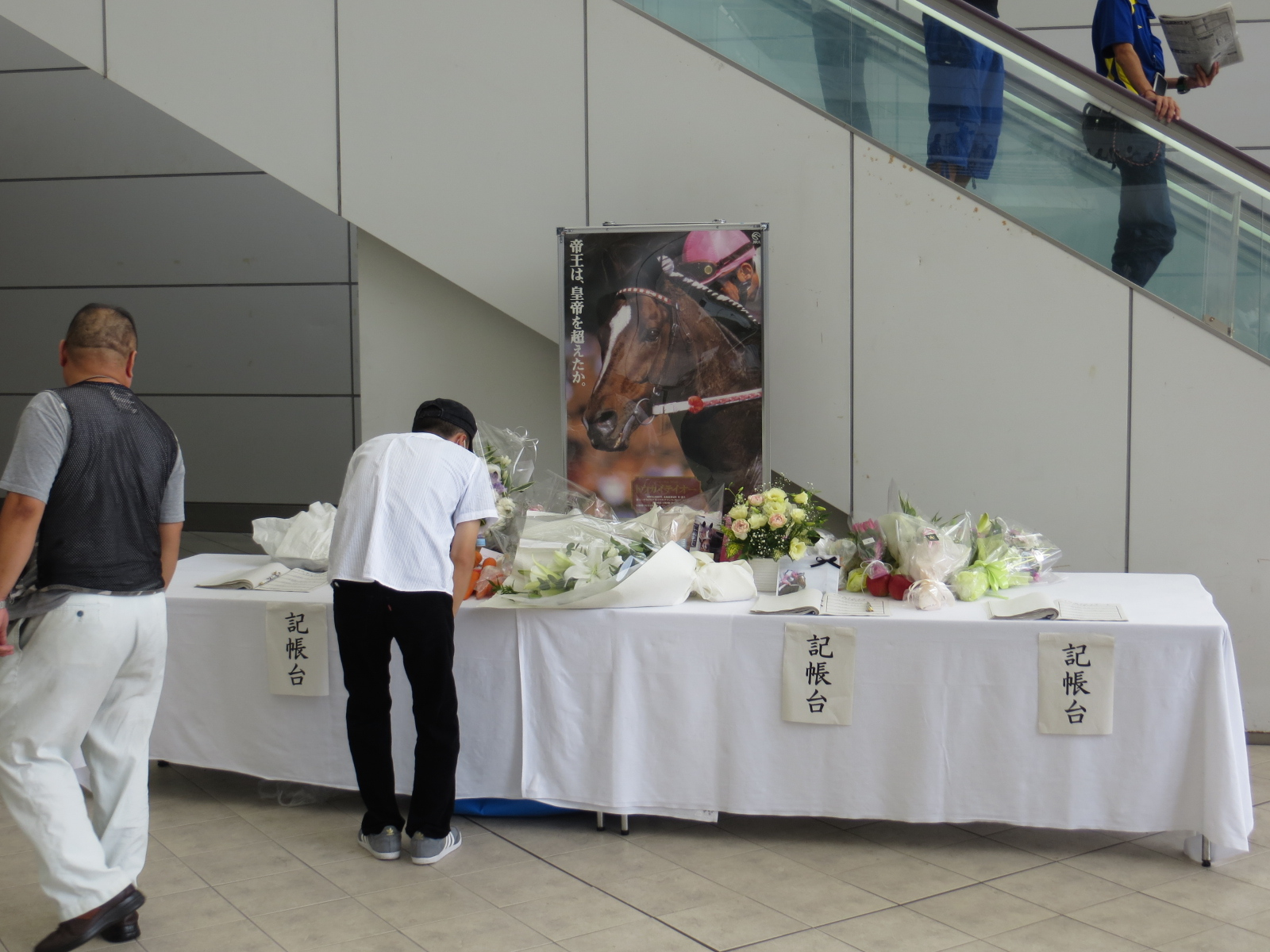
Memorial of Tokai Teio at the Hanshin Racecourse in 2013

On 30 August 2013 at 3.30 p.m., Tokai Teio died due to acute heart failure at Shadai Stallion Station. He was 25 years old. A memorial stand was erected at all major racecourses in Japan a week after he was passed.

== In popular culture ==
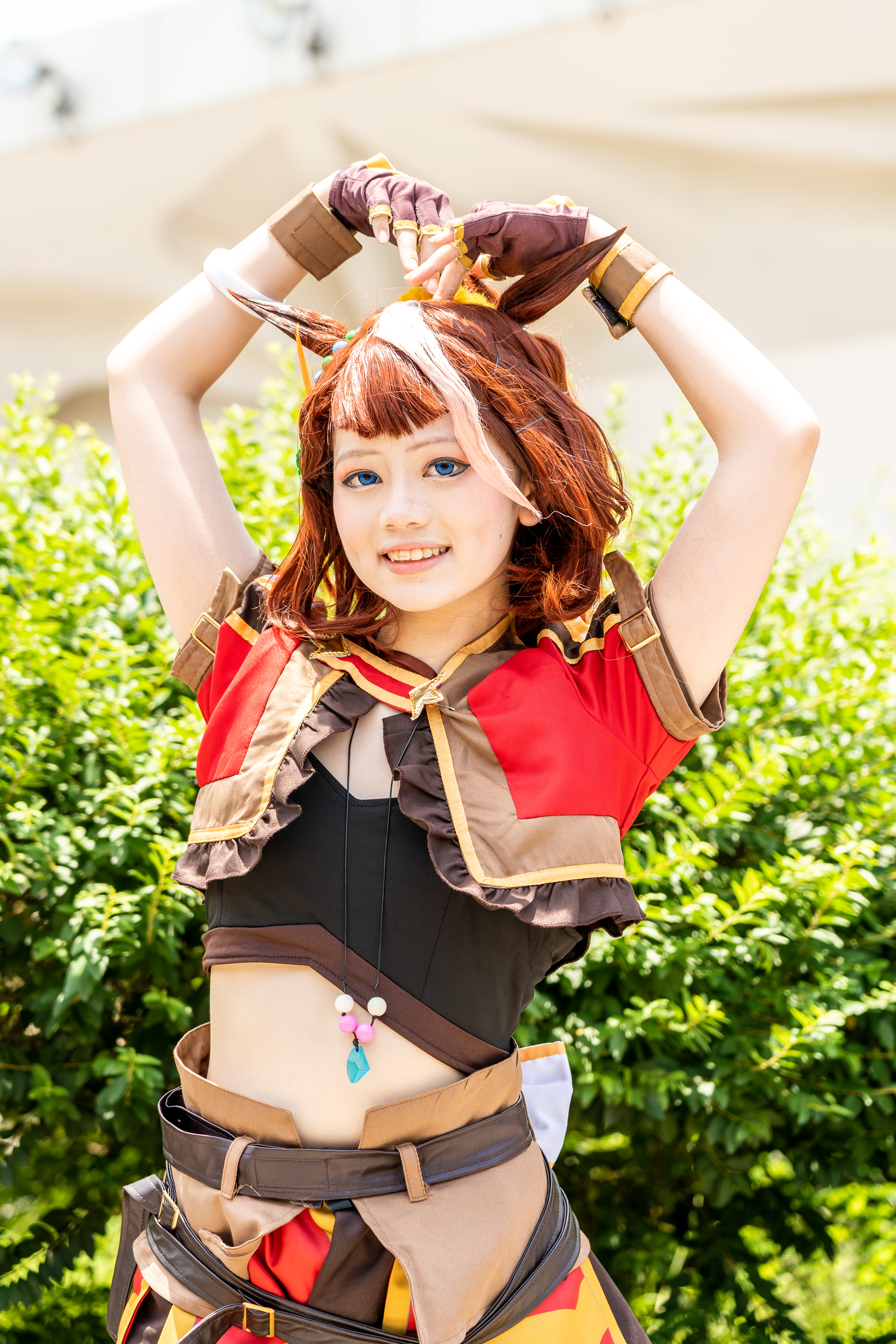
A cosplayer of Tokai Teio from Umamusume: Pretty Derby giving a heart arm gesture.

You know, after all...for something to remain so vividly in your memory...it's already been 20-something years for me, and now, in this way, in all sorts of games...for the story of Tokai Teio to be gaining this much popularity...even after he has passed away, the fact that children who have since been born play a game and have come to know who Tokai Teio is...it was a happy moment, wasn't it...that instant when I realized it. It's a feeling of "thank you," isn't it? Really...I just want to say thank you, Tokai Teio.

— Seiki Tabara

An anthropomorphized version of Tokai Teio appears as a character in the Japanese multimedia franchise Umamusume: Pretty Derby, voiced by Machico. She is depicted as a cheerful and talented girl who craves attention and has a deep admiration for Symboli Rudolf, Tracen Academy's student council president, and makes it her mission to emulate her success by obtaining the Triple Crown, a reference to Symboli Rudolf being Tokai Teio's sire. Like her real-life counterpart, she suffers multiple injuries and struggles to remain one of the best racers. She has a notable dislike for medical check-ups, with a particularly strong fear of the Mejiro family's doctor introduced to her by Mejiro McQueen. She is the main protagonist of the second season of the Umamusume anime alongside McQueen, which follows her real-life counterpart's racing career. The 1993 Arima Kinen is portrayed in the anime second season finale, "Galloping After Our Dreams", and also incorporates the actual words of the broadcast call.

== Racing record ==
| Date | Age | Track | Name | Grade | Field | Finished | Jockey | Distance | Time | Winner (2nd Place) |
|---|---|---|---|---|---|---|---|---|---|---|
| Dec 1, 1990 | 2 | Chukyo | Two-year-old Newcomer | | 13 | 1st | Takayuki Yasuda | 1800m | 1:52.9 | (Color Guard) |
| Dec 23, 1990 | 2 | Kyoto | Cyclamen Stakes | OP | 9 | 1st | Takayuki Yasuda | 2000m | 2:03.8 | (Iide Satan) |
| Jan 19, 1991 | 3 | Kyoto | Wakakoma Stakes | OP | 9 | 1st | Takayuki Yasuda | 2000m | 2:01.4 | (Iide Satan) |
| Mar 17, 1991 | 3 | Nakayama | Wakaba Stakes | OP | 10 | 1st | Takayuki Yasuda | 2000m | 2:03.6 | (Asakichi) |
| Apr 14, 1991 | 3 | Nakayama | Satsuki Shō | G1 | 18 | 1st | Takayuki Yasuda | 2000m | 2:01.8 | (Shako Grade) |
| May 26, 1991 | 3 | Tokyo | Tōkyō Yūshun | G1 | 20 | 1st | Takayuki Yasuda | 2400m | 2:25.9 | (Leo Durban) |
| Apr 5, 1992 | 4 | Hanshin | Sankei Ōsaka Hai | G2 | 8 | 1st | Yukio Okabe | 2000m | 2:06.3 | (Golden Hour) |
| Apr 26, 1992 | 4 | Kyoto | Tenno Sho (Spring) | G1 | 14 | 5th | Yukio Okabe | 3200m | 3:21.7 | Mejiro McQueen |
| Nov 1, 1992 | 4 | Tokyo | Tenno Sho (Autumn) | G1 | 18 | 7th | Yukio Okabe | 2000m | 1:59.1 | Let's Go Tarquin |
| Nov 29, 1992 | 4 | Tokyo | Japan Cup | G1 | 14 | 1st | Yukio Okabe | 2400m | 2:24.6 | (Naturalism) |
| Dec 27, 1992 | 4 | Nakayama | Arima Kinen | G1 | 14 | 11th | Seiki Tabara | 2500m | 2:34.8 | Mejiro Palmer |
| Dec 26, 1993 | 5 | Nakayama | Arima Kinen | G1 | 14 | 1st | Seiki Tabara | 2500m | 2:30.9 | (Biwa Hayahide) |

== Pedigree ==
Pedigree of Tokai Teio (JPN), bay stallion, 1988
| Sire Symboli Rudolf (JPN) B. 1981 | Partholon | Milesian | My Babu |
| Sire Symboli Rudolf (JPN) B. 1981 | Partholon | Milesian | Oatflake |
| Sire Symboli Rudolf (JPN) B. 1981 | Partholon | Paleo | Pharis |
| Sire Symboli Rudolf (JPN) B. 1981 | Partholon | Paleo | Colonice |
| Sire Symboli Rudolf (JPN) B. 1981 | Sweet Luna | Speed Symboli | Royal Challenger |
| Sire Symboli Rudolf (JPN) B. 1981 | Sweet Luna | Speed Symboli | Sweet Inn |
| Sire Symboli Rudolf (JPN) B. 1981 | Sweet Luna | Dance Time | Palestine |
| Sire Symboli Rudolf (JPN) B. 1981 | Sweet Luna | Dance Time | Samaritaine |
| Dam Tokai Natural (JPN) B. 1982 | Nice Dancer | Northern Dancer | Nearctic |
| Dam Tokai Natural (JPN) B. 1982 | Nice Dancer | Northern Dancer | Natalma |
| Dam Tokai Natural (JPN) B. 1982 | Nice Dancer | Nice Princess | Le Beau Prince |
| Dam Tokai Natural (JPN) B. 1982 | Nice Dancer | Nice Princess | Happy Night |
| Dam Tokai Natural (JPN) B. 1982 | Tokai Midori | Faberge | Princely Gift |
| Dam Tokai Natural (JPN) B. 1982 | Tokai Midori | Faberge | Spring Offensive |
| Dam Tokai Natural (JPN) B. 1982 | Tokai Midori | Tokai Queen | Atlantis |
| Dam Tokai Natural (JPN) B. 1982 | Tokai Midori | Tokai Queen | Top Ryu (F-No.19-b) |

== See also ==
- List of racehorses
