= Orfevre =

Japanese-bred Thoroughbred racehorse

Orfevre オルフェーヴル
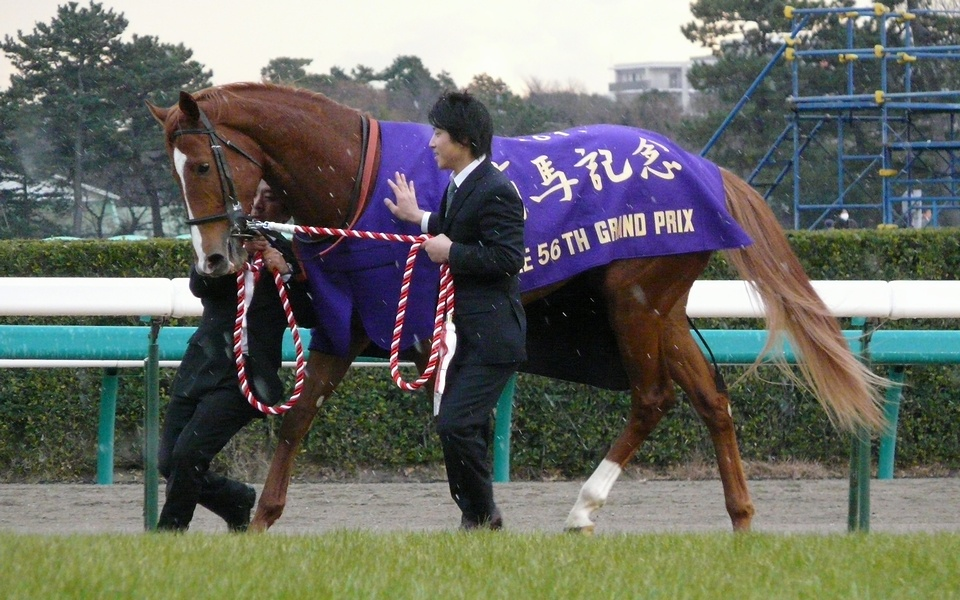
- Orfevre after winning the 2011 Arima Kinen.
- Breed: Thoroughbred
- Sire: Stay Gold (JPN)
- Grandsire: Sunday Silence (USA)
- Dam: Oriental Art (JPN)
- Damsire: Mejiro McQueen (JPN)
- Sex: Stallion
- Foaled: May 14, 2008 (age 18)
- Country: Japan
- Colour: Chestnut
- Breeder: Shadai Farm
- Owner: Sunday Racing
- Racing colours
- Trainer: Yasutoshi Ikee
- Jockey: Kenichi Ikezoe (Japan); Christophe Soumillon (In France)
- Record: 21: 12-6-1
- Earnings: ¥1,576,213,000; JPN: ¥1,344,084,000; FR: €2,159,880

Major wins
- Spring Stakes (2011); Kobe Shimbun Hai (2011); Arima Kinen (2011, 2013); Takarazuka Kinen (2012); Prix Foy (2012, 2013); Sankei Osaka Hai (2013); Japanese Classic Race wins: Satsuki Sho (2011); Tokyo Yushun (2011); Kikuka Sho (2011)

Awards
- 7th Japanese Triple Crown Champion (2011); Japanese Horse of the Year (2011); JRA Award for Best Three-Year-Old Colt (2011); JRA Award for Best Older Male Horse (2012, 2013)

Honours
- Japan Racing Association Hall of Fame (2015); Timeform rating: 132

Orfevre (Japanese: オルフェーヴル, Hepburn: Orufēvuru; foaled 14 May 2008) is a retired Japanese Thoroughbred racehorse and active breeding stallion. In 2011, he became the seventh colt to win the Japanese Triple Crown, and was voted Japanese Horse of the Year. In 2012, he added victories in the Takarazuka Kinen and the Prix Foy, but was narrowly beaten in both the Prix de l'Arc de Triomphe and the Japan Cup. In 2013, Orfevre again won the Prix Foy and finished second in the Arc, before ending his career with an eight-length win in the Arima Kinen. During his career, he acquired the reputation of being an extremely talented but temperamental racehorse. Orfevre was inducted into the Japan Racing Association Hall of Fame on 14 September 2015.

== Background ==
Orfevre, named after the French word for 'goldsmith', is a chestnut horse with a white blaze, bred by Shadai Farm in Hokkaido, Japan. His sire Stay Gold, a son of the thirteen-time Leading sire in Japan Sunday Silence, was a successful international performer, winning the Dubai Sheema Classic and the Hong Kong Vase. Standing as a stud at Big Red Farm in Hokkaido, Stay Gold has produced numerous important winners including Dream Journey, Nakayama Festa and Gold Ship. Orfevre's dam, Oriental Art, was a daughter of the Hall of Fame inductee Mejiro McQueen and also the dam of Dream Journey. Kenichi Ikezoe rode Orfevre in Japan while Christophe Soumillon rode the horse in his European races.

== Racing career ==
=== 2010: two-year-old season ===
Orfevre raced three times as a two-year-old in 2010, winning his first start a 'Newcomer' race (unraced maidens), second in an open class race and 10th in the Grade 2 Keio Hai Nisai Stakes.

=== 2011: three-year-old season ===
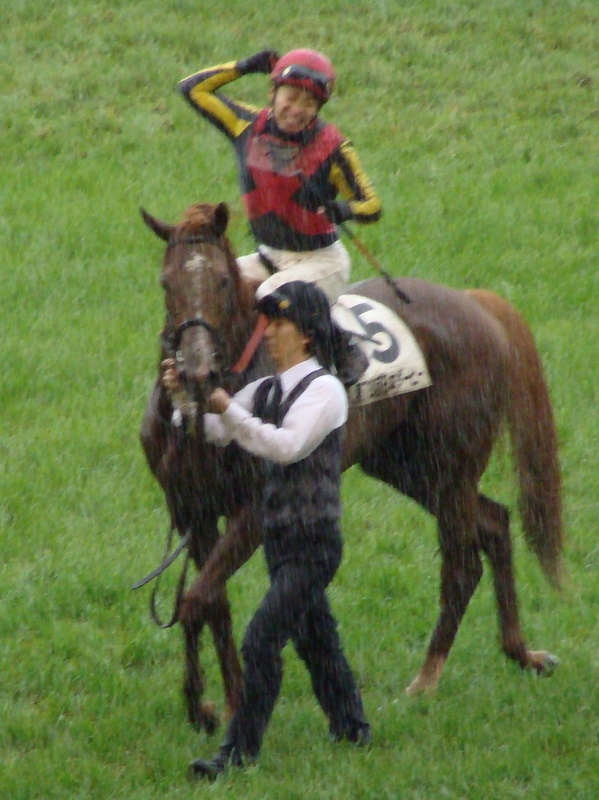
Orfevre after winning the 78th Tokyo Yushun

Orfevre was beaten in his first two races in 2011 but won his next six races. In March he won the Spring Stakes at Hanshin Racecourse. A month later he won the Satsuki Sho (Japanese 2000 Guineas), beating the odds-on favourite Sadamu Patek by three lengths. The race had been delayed for a week and moved from Nakayama to Tokyo as a result of the 11 March earthquake. On 29 May, Orfevre took the second leg of the Japanese Triple Crown when he came from well off the pace to beat Win Variation in the Tokyo Yushun (Japanese Derby).

After a break of almost four months, Orfevre returned to the racecourse in September to win the Grade 2 Kobe Shimbun Hai, again beating Win Variation. In October he completed the Triple Crown by winning the Kikuka Sho, with Win Variation finishing second yet again.

On his final start of the year, Orfevre contested the Arima Kinen on 25 December, facing older horses for the first time. The field included Buena Vista, Jaguar Mail, Victoire Pisa, Tosen Jordan and Hiruno d'Amour. Orfevre made a late run on the outside to win by three quarters of a length from Eishin Flash.

=== 2012: four-year-old season ===
Orfevre lost his first two races at the age of four. In the Grade 2 Hanshin Daishoten on 18 March he was virtually pulled up midway through the race before accelerating again to finish second. He then ran poorly when finishing eleventh in the Tenno Sho on 29 April. In June he returned to form to win the Takarazuka Kinen by two lengths from Rulership.

In the late summer of 2012, Orfevre was sent to Europe to prepare for the Prix de l'Arc de Triomphe. In September he won his trial race by beating Meandre in the G2 Prix Foy, which is run over the same course and distance as the Arc. In the Arc de Triomphe he started favourite ahead of the Epsom Derby winner Camelot, despite being given an unfavourable outside draw. Ridden by Christophe Soumillon, he was restrained at the back of the eighteen runner field before making rapid progress on the outside to take the lead in the straight. Orfevre opened up a clear advantage 200 metres from the finish, but then veered sharply right towards the inside rail. In the closing stages he was caught by the filly Solemia and finished second by a neck, seven lengths clear of the other runners.

After returning to Japan, his next race was the Japan Cup on 24 November. The race saw a close finish between Orfevre and the 2012 Fillies Triple Crown heroine Gentildonna. Orfevre was triple crown champion (male) the previous year. In the last 200 meters, he appeared to have been bumped off his racing line by Gentildonna who crossed the line a nose in front of the colt. The subsequent stewards' inquiry found that although interference had taken place, the result was allowed to stand, even though they handed down Gentildonna's jockey Yasunari Iwata a two-day suspension. Orfevre's Arc rival Solemia raced prominently throughout the race, but finished midfield. Despite receiving the most fan votes in Arima Kinen, Orfevre's side decided not to field him the race as defending winner, as he had not recovered sufficiently from the Arc and Japan Cup.

At the JRA Awards in January 2013, Orfevre won the JRA Award for Best Older Male Horse, taking 273 of the 289 votes. In the Horse of the Year poll he finished third to Gentildonna and Gold Ship.

=== 2013: five-year-old season ===
On his five-year-old debut, Orfevre ran in the Sankei Osaka Hai at Hanshin on 31 March. He started the 1/5 favourite and won from Shonan Mighty and Eishin Flash. Orfevre was expected to defend the Takarazuka Kinen on 23 June, but nine days before the race he bled after an exercise gallop. After exercise-induced pulmonary hemorrhage was diagnosed, Ikee decided to withdraw the horse from the race and target the Arc again.

As in the previous year, Orfevre was sent to Europe in the autumn in 2013 and ran in the Prix Foy as his trial race for the Arc. On 15 September he started as 4/6 favorite against eight opponents including Dunaden after the late withdrawal of Camelot. Ridden by Soumillon, he took the lead 200 metres from the finish and won easily by three lengths from Very Nice Name. In the Arc, Orfevre was made 13/10 favourite in a field of seventeen runners. He was restrained behind the leaders by Soumillon before moving forward in the straight and finished second for the second consecutive year, five length behind the winner Treve. Orfevre missed the Japan Cup and ran his final race in the Arima Kinen on 21 December. In front of a crowd of 124,782, he started the 3/5 favourite against fifteen opponents, with Gold Ship (17/5) being the only horse seriously backed against him. Kenichi Ikezoe restrained the colt in the early stages before moving forward on the final turn. Orfevre took the lead and drew away from the field to win by eight lengths from Win Variation, with Gold Ship in third. Later that evening, Orfevre paraded in front of 60,000 fans in his official retirement ceremony.

At the JRA Awards in January 2013, Orfevre defended JRA Award for Best Older Male Horse with 176 votes, beating sprinter Lord Kanaloa in 104. However, in Japanese Horse of the Year, he only voted in second place to Lord Kanaloa in a 209-69 margin. In the 2013 World's Best Racehorse Rankings Orfevre tied with Wise Dan for third place behind Treve and Black Caviar.

== Stud record ==
Orfevre currently stands at the Shadai Stallion Station at a service fee of JPY 3,500,000.

=== Notable progeny ===
c = colt, f = filly, g = gelding
Bold = G1/Jpn1 stakes

Grade One winners
Foaled	Name	Sex	Major Wins
2015	Epoca d'Oro	c	**Satsuki Sho**
2015	Lucky Lilac	f	Artemis Stakes, **Hanshin Juvenile Fillies**, Tulip Sho, **Queen Elizabeth II Cup** (twice), **Ōsaka Hai**
2016	Marche Lorraine	f	Ladies' Prelude, TCK Jo-o Hai, Empress Hai, Breeders' Gold Cup, **Breeders' Cup Distaff**
2017	Shonan Nadeshiko	f	Empress Hai, Marine Cup, **Kashiwa Kinen**, Sparking Lady Cup
2017	Ushba Tesoro	c	**Tokyo Daishoten** (twice), **Kawasaki Kinen**, **Dubai World Cup**, Nippon TV Hai
2023	Juryoku Pierrot	f	**Yushun Himba**

Other winners
Foaled	Name	Sex	Major Wins
2015	Bio Spark	g	Fukushima Kinen
2015	Rock This Town	f	Sapporo Nisai Stakes
2015	Solace	f	Mermaid Stakes
2016	Andraste	f	Chukyo Kinen
2016	Justin	c	Tokyo Sprint (twice), Tokyo Hai, Capella Stakes
2016	Ocea Great	c	Stayers Stakes
2016	Shoryu Ikuzo	c	Nikkei Shinshun Hai
2016	Silver Sonic	c	Stayers Stakes, Red Sea Turf Handicap
2016	Turbo	c	Niigata Jump Stakes, Hanshin Jump Stakes
2017	Authority	c	Aoba Sho, Copa Republica Argentina (twice), Neom Turf Cup
2017	Gilded Mirror	f	Musashino Stakes
2017	Iron Barows	c	Stayers Stakes
2017	Kurino Premium	f	Nakayama Himba Stakes
2017	Shine Garnet	f	Falcon Stakes
2018	Lagom	c	Kisaragi Sho
2018	Roscoff	c	Kokura Summer Jump
2018	So Valiant	c	Challenge Cup (twice)
2019	Lilac	f	Fairy Stakes
2019	Mixology	g	Diamond Stakes
2022	Kurino Mei	f	Tulip Sho
2023	Pendant	f	Kanto Oaks

In addition to the above horses, Melody Lane, who is the smallest Japanese-trained thoroughbred to have won a race, is also Orfevre's crop.

== Episode ==
Due to his fierce temperament and tendency to disobey his trainer and jockey, Orfevre was nicknamed the “Golden Tyrant.” However, when he met a five-year-old boy with a serious illness who was a fan of Orfevre, he behaved differently from usual and allowed the boy to touch his face several times.

== In popular culture ==
An anthropomorphized version of Orfevre appears as a character in the Japanese multimedia franchise Umamusume: Pretty Derby, voiced by Yoko Hikasa. She is depicted as an arrogant young woman who styles herself as the "king" and "tyrant" of racing who aims to take the Triple Crown, but is able to match her ego with her skill on the racetrack. She is Dream Journey's younger sister and roommate, and despite her arrogance and intimidating demeanor, she is kind and gentle towards children and the extremely shy Marche Lorraine, who is able to communicate with Orfevre without using her hand puppet. Due to her arrogance and pride intimidating others, she also has a possessive streak for the player trainer out of loneliness. Like other Umamusume in the game whose real-world counterparts are direct progeny of Stay Gold, Orfevre is part of a friend group of her admirers called the "Gold Clan" that is led by Stay Gold herself and includes her sister Dream Journey, Gold Ship, Nakayama Festa, and Fenomeno.

== Race record ==
The following form is based on information available on netkeiba.com and JBIS-Search.

Date	Distance (Condition)	Race	Class	Course	Field	Odds (Favourite)	Finish	Time	Winning (Losing) Margin	Jockey	Winner (2nd Place)	Ref
2010 – Two-year-old season
14 Aug	Turf 1600 m (Soft)	Two Year Old Debut		Niigata	14	3.0 (2nd)	1st	1:37.4	1 1/2 lengths	Kenichi Ikezoe	(Shonan Parfait)	
3 Oct	Turf 1600 m (Firm)	Fuyo Stakes	OP	Nakayama	8	2.1 (1st)	2nd	1:35.3	(neck)	Kenichi Ikezoe	Whale Capture	
13 Nov	Turf 1400 m (Firm)	Keio Hai Nisai Stakes	GII	Tokyo	15	3.3 (1st)	10th	1:22.6	(5 lengths)	Kenichi Ikezoe	Grand Prix Boss	
2011 – Three-year-old season
9 Jan	Turf 1600 m (Firm)	Shinzan Kinen	GIII	Kyoto	16	10.7 (3rd)	2nd	1:34.2	(1 1/2 lengths)	Kenichi Ikezoe	Red Davis	
6 Feb	Turf 1800 m (Firm)	Kisaragi Sho	GIII	Kyoto	12	2.9 (2nd)	3rd	1:47.8	(1 1/2 lengths)	Kenichi Ikezoe	Tosen Ra	
26 Mar	Turf 1800 m (Firm)	Spring Stakes	GII	Hanshin	18	4.7 (1st)	1st	1:46.4	3/4 length	Kenichi Ikezoe	(Belshazzar)	
24 Apr	Turf 2000 m (Firm)	Satsuki Sho	GI	Tokyo	18	10.8 (4th)	1st	2:00.6	3 lengths	Kenichi Ikezoe	(Sadamu Patek)	
29 May	Turf 2400 m (Heavy)	Tokyo Yushun	GI	Tokyo	18	3.0 (1st)	1st	2:30.5	1 3/4 lengths	Kenichi Ikezoe	(Win Variation)	
25 Sep	Turf 2400 m (Firm)	Kobe Shimbun Hai	GII	Hanshin	11	1.7 (1st)	1st	2:28.3	2 1/2 lengths	Kenichi Ikezoe	(Win Variation)	
23 Oct	Turf 3000 m (Firm)	Kikuka Sho	GI	Kyoto	18	1.4 (1st)	1st	3:02.8	2 1/2 lengths	Kenichi Ikezoe	(Win Variation)	
25 Dec	Turf 2500 m (Firm)	Arima Kinen	GI	Nakayama	13	2.2 (1st)	1st	2:36.0	3/4 length	Kenichi Ikezoe	(Eishin Flash)	
2012 – Four-year-old season
18 Mar	Turf 3000 m (Good)	Hanshin Daishoten	GII	Hanshin	12	1.1 (1st)	2nd	3:11.9	(1/2 length)	Kenichi Ikezoe	Gustave Cry	
29 Apr	Turf 3200 m (Firm)	Tenno Sho (Spring)	GI	Kyoto	18	1.3 (1st)	11th	3:15.6	(11 1/2 lengths)	Kenichi Ikezoe	Beat Black	
24 Jun	Turf 2200 m (Firm)	Takarazuka Kinen	GI	Hanshin	16	3.2 (1st)	1st	2:10.9	2 lengths	Kenichi Ikezoe	(Rulership)	
16 Sep	Turf 2400 m (Good)	Prix Foy	GII	Longchamp	5	1.9 (1st)	1st	2:34.26	1 length	Christophe Soumillon	(Meandre)	
7 Oct	Turf 2400 m (Heavy)	Prix de l'Arc de Triomphe	GI	Longchamp	18	6.0 (2nd)	2nd	--	(neck)	Christophe Soumillon	Solemia	
25 Nov	Turf 2400 m (Firm)	Japan Cup	GI	Tokyo	17	2.0 (1st)	2nd	2:23.1	(nose)	Kenichi Ikezoe	Gentildonna	
2013 – Five-year-old season
31 Mar	Turf 2000 m (Firm)	Sankei Osaka Hai	GII	Hanshin	14	1.2 (1st)	1st	1:59.0	1/2 length	Kenichi Ikezoe	(Shonan Mighty)	
15 Sep	Turf 2400 m (Soft)	Prix Foy	GII	Longchamp	9	1.67 (1st)	1st	2:41.47	3 lengths	Christophe Soumillon	(Very Nice Name)	
6 Oct	Turf 2400 m (Soft)	Prix de l'Arc de Triomphe	GI	Longchamp	17	3.0 (1st)	2nd	--	(5 lengths)	Christophe Soumillon	Treve	
22 Dec	Turf 2500 m (Firm)	Arima Kinen	GI	Nakayama	16	1.6 (1st)	1st	2:32.3	8 lengths	Kenichi Ikezoe	(Win Variation)	

== Pedigree ==
Pedigree of Orfevre (JPN), chestnut stallion, 2008
Sire Stay Gold (JPN) 1994	Sunday Silence (USA); 1986	Halo (USA)	Hail To Reason (USA)
Sire Stay Gold (JPN) 1994	Sunday Silence (USA); 1986	Halo (USA)	Cosmah (USA)
Sire Stay Gold (JPN) 1994	Sunday Silence (USA); 1986	Wishing Well (USA)	Understanding (USA)
Sire Stay Gold (JPN) 1994	Sunday Silence (USA); 1986	Wishing Well (USA)	Mountain Flower (USA)
Sire Stay Gold (JPN) 1994	Golden Sash (JPN); 1988	Dictus (FR)	Sanctus (FR)
Sire Stay Gold (JPN) 1994	Golden Sash (JPN); 1988	Dictus (FR)	Doronic (FR)
Sire Stay Gold (JPN) 1994	Golden Sash (JPN); 1988	Dyna Sash (JPN)	Northern Taste (CAN)
Sire Stay Gold (JPN) 1994	Golden Sash (JPN); 1988	Dyna Sash (JPN)	Royal Sash (GB)
Dam Oriental Art (JPN) 1997	Mejiro McQueen (JPN); 1987	Mejiro Titan (JPN)	Mejiro Asama (JPN)
Dam Oriental Art (JPN) 1997	Mejiro McQueen (JPN); 1987	Mejiro Titan (JPN)	Cheryl (FR)
Dam Oriental Art (JPN) 1997	Mejiro McQueen (JPN); 1987	Mejiro Aurora (JPN)	Remand (GB)
Dam Oriental Art (JPN) 1997	Mejiro McQueen (JPN); 1987	Mejiro Aurora (JPN)	Mejiro Iris (JPN)
Dam Oriental Art (JPN) 1997	Electro Art (JPN); 1986	Northern Taste (CAN)	Northern Dancer (CAN)
Dam Oriental Art (JPN) 1997	Electro Art (JPN); 1986	Northern Taste (CAN)	Lady Victoria (CAN)
Dam Oriental Art (JPN) 1997	Electro Art (JPN); 1986	Grandma Stevens (USA)	Lt. Stevens (USA)
Dam Oriental Art (JPN) 1997	Electro Art (JPN); 1986	Grandma Stevens (USA)	Dhow (USA) (Family:8-c)

- Orfevre is inbred 3 x 4 to Northern Taste, meaning that this stallion appears in both the third and fourth generations of his pedigree, as well as in that of his full brother Dream Journey.
