= Captain Thule =

Japanese Thoroughbred racehorse (2005)

Captain Thule; キャプテントゥーレ
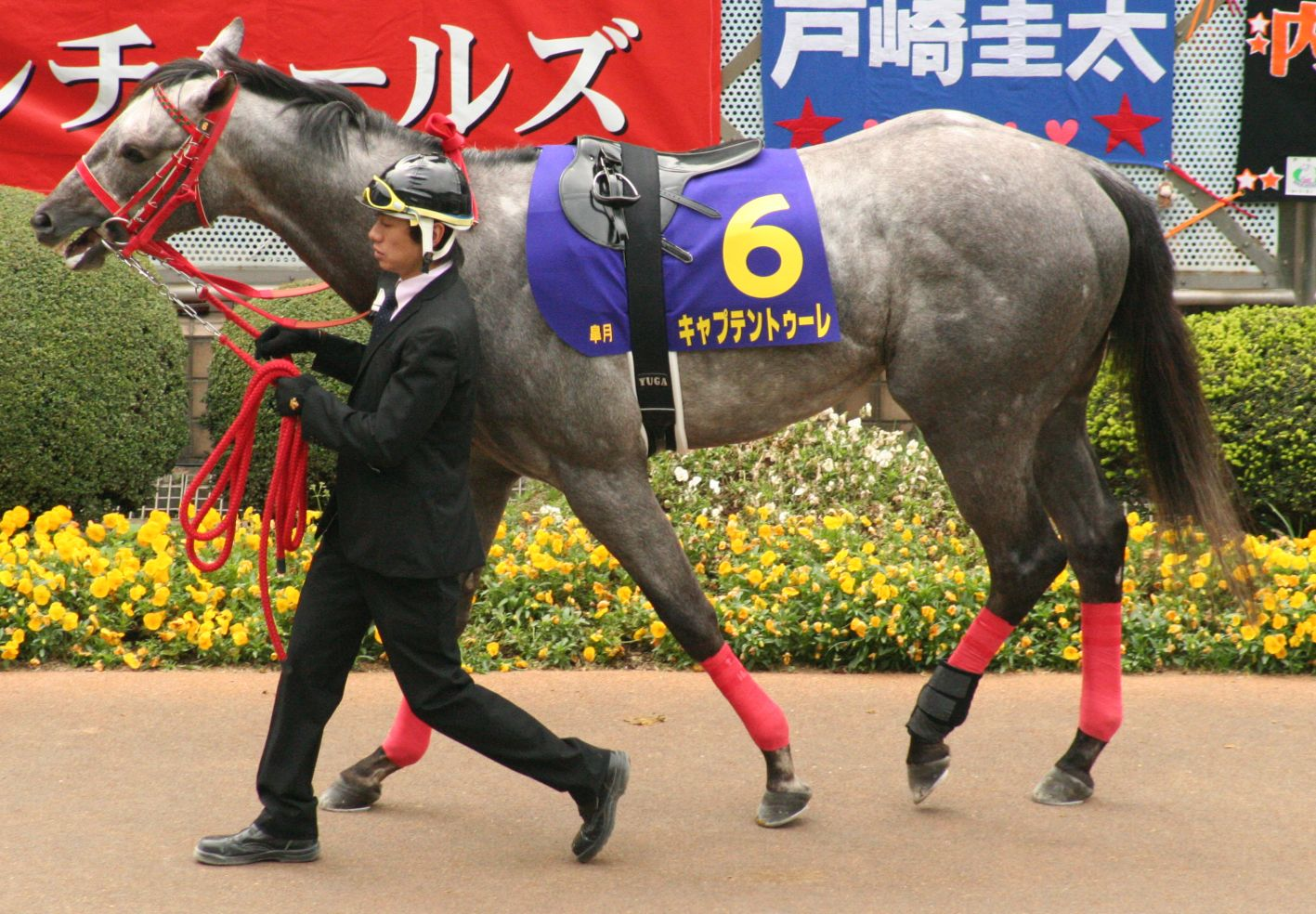
- Captain Thule at the 2008 Satsuki Sho paddock.
- Breed: Thoroughbred
- Sire: Agnes Tachyon (JPN)
- Grandsire: Sunday Silence (USA)
- Dam: Air Thule (JPN)
- Damsire: Tony Bin (IRE)
- Sex: Stallion
- Foaled: April 5, 2005 (age 21)
- Country: Japan
- Colour: Gray
- Breeder: Shadai Farm
- Owner: Shadai Race Horse Co.
- Racing colours
- Trainer: Hideyuki Mori
- Jockey: Yuga Kawada; Futoshi Komaki
- Record: 20: 5-2-3
- Earnings: ¥380,972,000

Major wins
- Daily Hai Nisai Stakes (2007); Asahi Challenge Cup (2009, 2010); Japanese Classic Race wins: Satsuki Shō (2008)
- Last updated on October 12, 2026

Captain Thule (Japanese: キャプテントゥーレ, Hepburn: Kyaputento~ūre; April 5, 2005) is a former Japanese thoroughbred racehorse and stud. His biggest win of his career came at the 2008 Satsuki Sho, where he led the race from start to finish and gave the first ever classic win for Yuga Kawada. He also won the 2007 Daily Hai Nisai Stakes and back to back title at the Asahi Challenge Cup in 2009 and 2010.

== Background ==
Captain Thule was foaled out of Air Thule, the winner of the 2001 Hanshin Himba Stakes, and finished second behind May Ball in the 2001 Prix Maurice de Gheest. Air Thule was also a successful broodmare, having foaled Centaur Stakes and Silk Road Stakes winner Ultima Thule as well as Kokura Kinen winner Crans Montana and Stayers Stakes winner Silver Sonic. Captain Thule's granddam, Ski Paradise was the winner of 1994 Prix du Moulin de Longchamp whilst her great dam dam, Ski Goggle was the winner of 1983 Acorn Stakes. He was sired by Agnes Tachyon, the 2001 Satsuki Sho winner and the 2008 leading sire in Japan, the one who toppled his grandsire from that title for thirteen years straight, Sunday Silence.

The Captain moniker came from a tribute to his uncle, the winner of the 1995 Kisaragi Sho, Ski Captain and Thule came directly from his dam which symbolised the limitless potential of the horse inspired by the domestic's and international's dominance of his predecessors.

== Racing career ==
=== 2007: two-year-old season ===
He made his debut in the 1800 metre race at Hanshin with Yutaka Take on his saddle. As the first favourite, he tracked in a good position but failed to extend his lead in the final straight and dropped to eighth on the day. The winner for that debut was the eventual 2011 Takarazuka Kinen's winner, Earnestly. At the end of July, Take rode him better as he managed to stay at the lead and hold off Johnny Barows to win by half a length. Two months later, he ran in his first open-grade race, the Nojigiku Stakes. In this race, Take rode him mostly at the back, and he spurted forward in the later phase from second-to-last position. He challenged for the lead but was beaten in the straight and finished third. His next race would be in October, which was his first graded race, the Daily Hai Nisai Stakes with Yuga Kawada as his jockey. In the race, Kawada rode him in second until the final corner, then cued the horse to overtake the leader, Take Mikazuchi, and he maintained the lead to win by one and three-quarters length on the line. For his end-of-season race, he was registered for both Zen-Nippon Nisai Yushun and Asahi Hai Futurity Stakes, but the trainer opted for the latter as Kawada stayed as his jockey. On the day, he was held up a bit at the start but recovered well as the race progressed to finish third. In the post-race, Kawada was dejected with the start, thought he could at least finish in second, and admitted that the winner, Goshawk Ken, was strong despite running at a comfortable pace.

=== 2008: three-year-old season ===
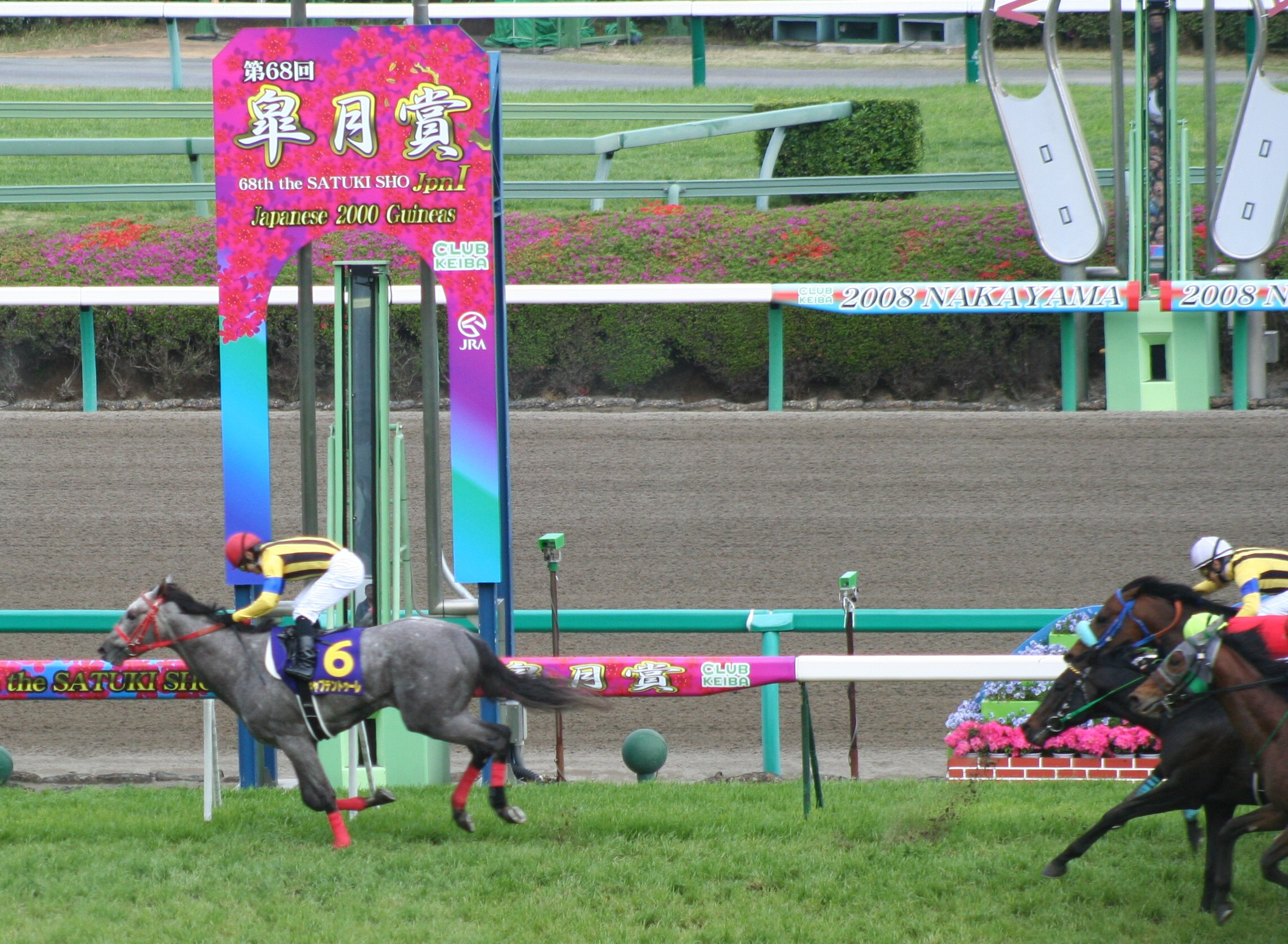
Captain Thule (number 6) winning the 68th Satsuki Sho.

After the turn of the new year, Captain Thule underwent training for the trial race of the Satsuki Sho, which was the Yayoi Sho. The training went well as he kept up with his training mate in his final workout. On the day, the horse finished in fourth place. Despite a poor finish, Kawada said the performance was good enough as a preparation for the eventual Satsuki Sho. In April, he was registered for the Satsuki Sho. The training for the day went well as one of his assistant trainer said that he almost hit the condition when he was winning the Daily Hai Nisai Stakes a year ago. When the gates open, Kawada nailed the good start from gate 6, controlled the rhythm for the whole distance and won the race by two and a half lengths over the next finisher, Take Mikazuchi. In the post race, Kawada exclaimed that the runaway was planned and as they were approaching the final straight, he knew that they were safely going to take the win. This win was the first classic win and G1 victory for Kawada himself. However, this race took a heavy toll on his physique, as he was diagnosed with a left foreleg fracture that would require a year to recover. His trainer, Hideyuki Mori, said that it was deeply frustrating that his fracture happened after the horse worked so hard and hoped that he would recover early next year, with a target at the American Jockey Club Cup race.

=== 2009: four-year-old season ===
As it turned out, Captain Thule took 16 months to recuperate from his injury and only made his comeback at the Sekiya Kinen in August. The training for this race was light and careful but the assistant trainer said he was in good shape and almost up to full speed for the race. As usual, he was front-running from the get-go but gassed out in the final straight and came home in fourth. Mori commented that the horse did not fell out from the lead pack and prayed that the horse would stay healthy for a good campaign. In September, he ran in the Asahi Challenge Cup, a G3 race held in Hanshin. He was in good shape and clocking great times in his final workout leading up to this race. When the race began, the horse tracked the leaders from a good position, took the lead halfway down the straight, and won by a neck in a fierce battle with the fourth favorite Break Run Out, who came from the outside. That exciting duel in the end was noted by Kawada after the race as he glad that he won the race and the horse came home safely. Right after this win, Captain Thule joined his first G1 race since the injury, the Tenno Sho (Autumn). He came to the Tokyo Racecourse in good physical condition coming off the win. Unfortunately, the good condition did not translate into the race day as he fell out of rhythm and only finished in 12th. Kawada said that the challenge from Matsurida Gogh basically made it tough for Captain Thule to run at his own pace at the end. The horse ended his season with a run at the Mile Championship in late November as he was drawn to start from gate 9. Along the way, he challenged the Tenno Sho (Autumn)'s winner, Company in second position. He ran to the outside track on the homestretch and made a bid for the win but slightly losing speed in the straight and finished in fourth on the line as Meiner Falke and Sahpresa surpassed him.

=== 2010: five-year-old season ===
This year, he started his year early at the America Jockey Club Cup in January. On this occasion, his jockey switched to Christophe Lemaire, who was happy with his first workout with the horse. Even though he was touted as the favourite, once again he did not make a good impression and finished in a lowly 11th. In March, Captain Thule got an invitation to run at the Singapore Airlines International Cup, but it was rejected as his next journey would be at the Yomiuri Milers Cup in April and back with Kawada once again. In the training, Kawada make sure that the horse was not over exerting himself with the workout. He made a good late charge in the race but only finished in third place for the day one and a quarter lengths behind Reach The Crown and Triumph March. He went straight to Yasuda Kinen in June after this, as a sole horse that already won the G1 in their careers. On the day with Norihiro Yokoyama on his saddle, he raced hard in fourth place, but struggled to gain ground in the straight and finished seventh behind Showa Modern. Speaking about the result, Yokoyama praised that the horse had done his best on the day. He rested up for the summer before returning to the turf on the Asahi Challenge Cup to defend his title the previous year. Futoshi Komaki took the reins from then on as he commented that he can run faster than what he showed in training. That saying was not fluff, as he did lead the race wire-to-wire to get his back-to-back win and his fourth graded stakes win. His final race for the year would be another attempt at the Tenno Sho (Autumn). Speaking about the possible poor track conditions, the assistant trainer shushed it off and welcomed the challenge that was expected. This word turned out poorly for the team as Captain Thule finished 13th after losing momentum on the final straight from second position. Komaki reflected after the race that it was not going well since the start as the outside gate draws messed up his rhythm along the way.

=== 2011: six-year-old season ===
His first race for this year would be at the Nakayama Kinen in Nakayama in February. When the gates opened, Komaki nailed a great start and maintained the pace until the homestretch, where Victoire Pisa stole the win from the back of the pack as he came home in second place, two and a half lengths behind. His connection decided to rest him for a while and decided that the next race for the campaign would be the Sankei Osaka Hai in April. This time, he lost more time on the final straight against his competitors after leading the majority of the race and finished in fifth. Komaki said in the post-race that he thought the horse was able to pull away in the final straight, but he could not and admitted his horse did not have the needed finishing speed in the final phase. Two months later, he ran in the Kinko Sho. He was comfortably leading the way and nearing his fifth graded stakes win until Rulership, who started late early on, surged from behind in the final straight and pulled away to win by three quarters of a length on the line. Komaki thought he had a chance that day and the ground was not a problem, but the winning horse was stronger. This year, he did not rest up in the summer, skipped the Takarazuka Kinen, and joined the Tanabata Sho in July as the favourite. At first, he led the race mostly in second position but faltered as the race went on and ended up in 12th place on the day. Komaki said that this time he was not fixated on leading, but the horse wanted to do that. As soon as others caught up, the horse lost the rhythm compared to when he was running alone, as he could not show his true quality when leading in a group. This race turned out to be his last race as in October, he was retired from racing, deregistered from the racing registry and put into stud duty at Shadai Stallion Station.

== Racing form ==
Captain Thule won five races and hit five more podiums out of 20 starts. This data is based on JBIS and netkeiba.

Date	Track	Race	Grade	Distance (Condition)	Entry	HN	Odds (Favored)	Finish	Time	Margins	Jockey	Winner (Runner-up)
2007 – two-year-old season
Jul 8	Hanshin	2yo debut		1,800 m (Firm)	15	14	1.8（1）	8th	1:50.3	1.6	Yutaka Take	Earnestly
Jul 29	Kokura	2yo maiden		1,800 m (Firm)	15	12	2.6（1）	1st	1:50.4	–0.1	Yutaka Take	(Johnny Barows)
Sep 16	Hanshin	Nojigiku Stakes	OP	1,800 m (Firm)	8	4	2.1（1）	3rd	1:47.9	0.3	Yutaka Take	Osumi Martial
Oct 13	Kyoto	Daily Hai Nisai Stakes	GII	1,600 m (Firm)	13	5	7.5（3）	1st	1:35.6	–0.3	Yuga Kawada	(Take Mikazuchi)
Dec 9	Nakayama	Asahi Hai Futurity Stakes	GI	1,600 m (Firm)	16	7	8.3（4）	3rd	1:33.9	0.4	Yuga Kawada	Goshawk Ken
2008 – three-year-old season
Mar 9	Nakayama	Yayoi Sho	GII	2,000 m (Firm)	16	15	8.7（5）	4th	2:02.2	0.4	Yuga Kawada	Meiner Charles
Apr 20	Nakayama	Satsuki Sho	GI	2,000 m (Firm)	18	6	17.1（7）	1st	2:01.7	–0.4	Yuga Kawada	(Take Mikazuchi)
2009 – four-year-old season
Aug 9	Niigata	Sekiya Kinen	GIII	1,600 m (Good)	18	17	9.7（4）	4th	1:33.2	0.5	Yuga Kawada	Smile Jack
Sep 12	Hanshin	Asahi Challenge Cup	GIII	2,000 m (Good)	16	6	2.4（1）	1st	2:00.0	0.0	Yuga Kawada	(Break Run Out)
Nov 1	Tokyo	Tenno Sho (Autumn)	GI	2,000 m (Firm)	18	8	16.0（6）	12th	1:58.5	1.3	Yuga Kawada	Company
Nov 22	Kyoto	Mile Championship	GI	1,600 m (Firm)	18	9	8.8（3）	4th	1:33.4	0.2	Yuga Kawada	Company
2010 – five-year-old season
Jan 24	Nakayama	American Jockey Club Cup	GII	2,200 m (Firm)	13	4	3.3（1）	11th	2:14.5	1.9	Christophe Lemaire	Never Bouchon
Apr 17	Hanshin	Yomiuri Milers Cup	GII	1,600 m (Firm)	18	12	7.5（5）	3rd	1:33.1	0.2	Yuga Kawada	Reach the Crown
Jun 6	Tokyo	Yasuda Kinen	GI	1,600 m (Firm)	18	8	7.2（3）	7th	1:32.0	0.3	Norihiro Yokoyama	Showa Modern
Sep 11	Hanshin	Asahi Challenge Cup	GIII	2,000 m (Firm)	9	6	3.1（2）	1st	1:59.2	–0.3	Futoshi Komaki	(Provinage)
Oct 31	Tokyo	Tenno Sho (Autumn)	GI	2,000 m (Good)	18	16	28.4（9）	13th	2:00.1	1.9	Futoshi Komaki	Buena Vista
2011 – six-year-old season
Feb 27	Nakayama	Nakayama Kinen	GII	1,800 m (Firm)	12	3	10.3（4）	2nd	1:46.4	0.4	Futoshi Komaki	Victoire Pisa
Apr 3	Hanshin	Sankei Osaka Hai	GII	2,000 m (Firm)	15	5	4.3（2）	5th	1:57.9	0.1	Futoshi Komaki	Hiruno d'Amour
May 28	Kyoto	Kinko Sho	GII	2,000 m (Heavy)	16	5	3.9（2）	2nd	2:02.5	0.1	Futoshi Komaki	Rulership
Jul 10	Nakayama	Tanabata Sho	GIII	2,000 m (Firm)	17	9	2.2（1）	12th	2:01.4	0.9	Futoshi Komaki	Italian Red

Legend:
Turf

== Stud career ==
Captain Thule stayed at Shadai Stallion Station between 2011 and 2015 and moved out to finish off his stud career at Lex Stud in 2016. He was sent back to the Shadai Farm at the beginning of 2017 to spend the rest of his life there. During his stud years, he bred with 257 mares, produced 155 foals, registered 152 of them as race horses with earnings of ¥873,584,500 and AEI of 0.45.

== Pedigree ==
Pedigree of Captain Thule (JPN), gray stallion, 2005
Sire Agnes Tachyon (JPN) 1998	Sunday Silence (USA); 1986	Halo	Hail to Reason
Sire Agnes Tachyon (JPN) 1998	Sunday Silence (USA); 1986	Halo	Cosmah
Sire Agnes Tachyon (JPN) 1998	Sunday Silence (USA); 1986	Wishing Well	Understanding
Sire Agnes Tachyon (JPN) 1998	Sunday Silence (USA); 1986	Wishing Well	Mountain Flower
Sire Agnes Tachyon (JPN) 1998	Agnes Flora (JPN); 1987	Royal Ski	Raja Baba
Sire Agnes Tachyon (JPN) 1998	Agnes Flora (JPN); 1987	Royal Ski	Coz o'Nijinsky
Sire Agnes Tachyon (JPN) 1998	Agnes Flora (JPN); 1987	Agnes Lady	Remand
Sire Agnes Tachyon (JPN) 1998	Agnes Flora (JPN); 1987	Agnes Lady	Ikoma Eikan
Dam Air Thule (JPN) 1997 F. no: 3-l	Tony Bin (IRE); 1983	Kampala (GB)	Kalamoun
Dam Air Thule (JPN) 1997 F. no: 3-l	Tony Bin (IRE); 1983	Kampala (GB)	State Pension
Dam Air Thule (JPN) 1997 F. no: 3-l	Tony Bin (IRE); 1983	Severn Bridge (GB)	Hornbeam
Dam Air Thule (JPN) 1997 F. no: 3-l	Tony Bin (IRE); 1983	Severn Bridge (GB)	Priddy Fair
Dam Air Thule (JPN) 1997 F. no: 3-l	Ski Paradise (USA); 1990	Lyphard (USA)	Northern Dancer
Dam Air Thule (JPN) 1997 F. no: 3-l	Ski Paradise (USA); 1990	Lyphard (USA)	Goofed
Dam Air Thule (JPN) 1997 F. no: 3-l	Ski Paradise (USA); 1990	Ski Goggle (USA)	Royal Ski
Dam Air Thule (JPN) 1997 F. no: 3-l	Ski Paradise (USA); 1990	Ski Goggle (USA)	Mississippi Siren

- Captain Thule is an inbred by 3 x 4 to Royal Ski.
