= Silver Sonic (horse) =

Japanese Thoroughbred racehorse (foaled 2016)

Silver Sonic; シルヴァーソニック
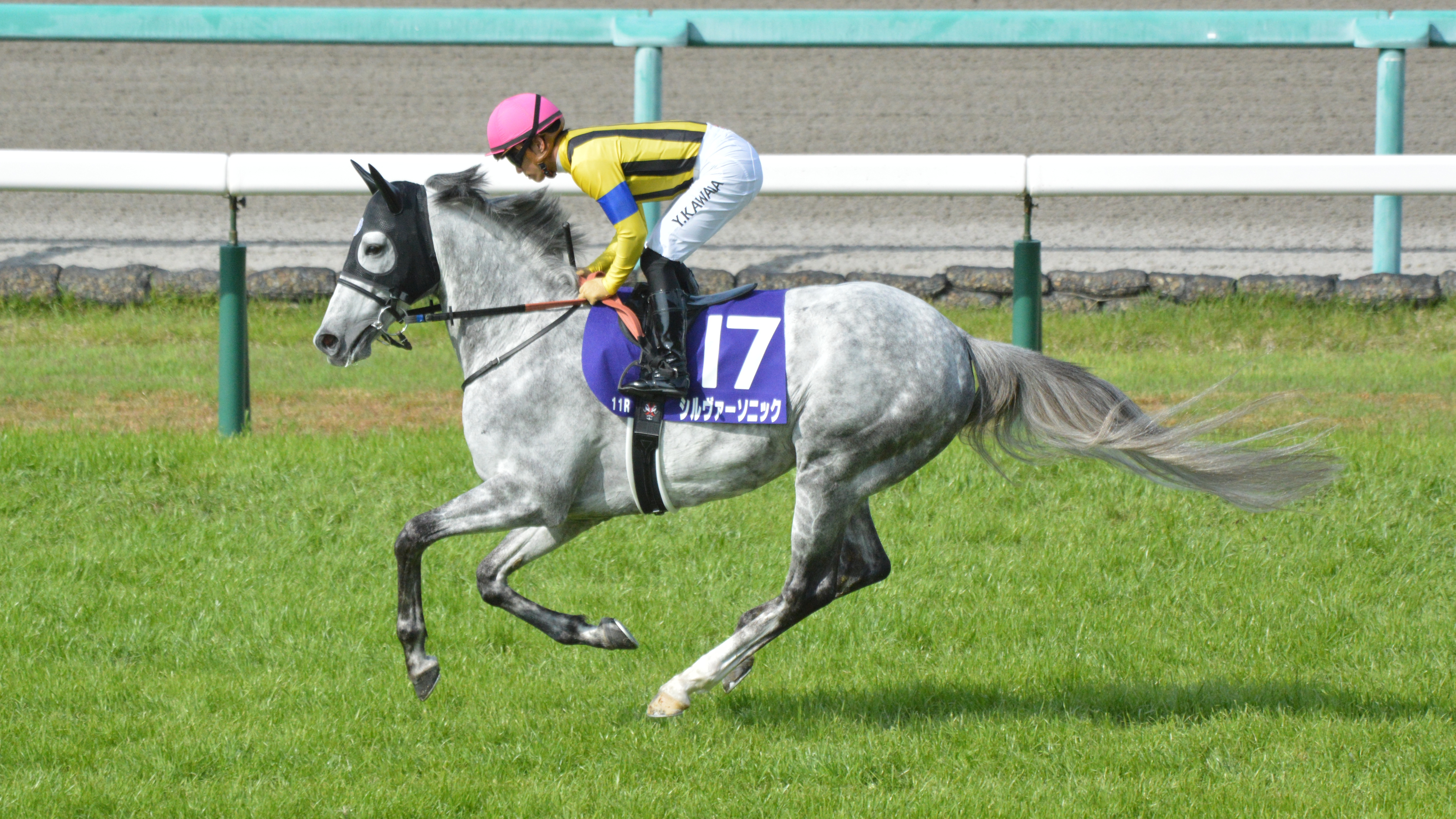
- Silver Sonic at the 2022 Tennō Shō (Spring)
- Breed: Thoroughbred
- Sire: Orfevre
- Grandsire: Stay Gold
- Dam: Air Thule
- Damsire: Tony Bin
- Sex: Stallion
- Foaled: 22 March 2016 (age 10)
- Country: Japan
- Colour: Grey
- Breeder: Shadai Farm
- Owner: Shadai Race Horse
- Racing colours
- Trainer: Yasutoshi Ikee
- Jockey: Kohei Matsuyama; Kota Fujioka; Brenton Avdulla; Yuga Kawada; Hironobu Tanabe; Kanichiro Fujii; Daisaku Matsuda; Yutaka Take; Mirai Iwata; Takuya Ono; Christophe Lemaire; Shu Ishibashi; Hiroyuki Uchida; Damian Lane; Mirco Demuro
- Record: 24: 6-3-7
- Earnings: ¥434,347,400

Major wins
- Stayers Stakes (2022); Red Sea Turf Handicap (2023)

Silver Sonic (Japanese: シルヴァーソニック, Shiruvā Sonikku; foaled 22 March 2016) is a retired Japanese Thoroughbred racehorse. He recorded six wins from twenty-four starts between 2019 and 2024, including the Stayers Stakes (GII) in 2022 and the Red Sea Turf Handicap (G3) in 2023. In the 2022 Tennō Shō (Spring), he unseated his jockey at the start and ran on riderless, passing the post second before falling; he was uninjured. He was rated 115 on the 2023 Longines World's Best Racehorse Rankings. His name means "silver of the speed of sound".

== Background ==
Silver Sonic is a grey stallion bred in Chitose, Hokkaido, by Shadai Farm. He was sired by Orfevre, a son of Stay Gold, and his dam was Air Thule, a grey mare by Tony Bin who won the Hanshin Himba Stakes. He was owned by Shadai Race Horse and trained by Yasutoshi Ikee at the JRA's Ritto Training Center. His half-brother Captain Thule (by Agnes Tachyon) won the Satsuki Shō, and his half-sister Ultima Thule (by Fuji Kiseki) won the Centaur Stakes and the Silk Road Stakes. His granddam Ski Paradise won the Prix du Moulin de Longchamp and the Keio Hai Spring Cup.

He was nicknamed "Silvie" by his groom, Keita Ikemoto.

== Racing career ==
=== 2019: three-year-old season ===
Silver Sonic did not race as a two-year-old. He debuted on 20 January 2019 in a 3-year-old newcomer race over 1600 metres on turf at Kyoto Racecourse, finishing second. After two further second-place finishes, he won his maiden race on 2 June at Hanshin Racecourse. He then won the Kunisaki Tokubetsu on 27 July and the Hyogo Tokubetsu on 29 September, recording three consecutive wins.

=== 2020: four-year-old season ===
He ran four times in 2020 without winning, recording a third-place finish in the Karasuma Stakes as his best result.

=== 2021: five-year-old season ===
Silver Sonic began the year with unplaced and minor finishes in allowance races. On 12 June, he won the June Stakes at Tokyo Racecourse, entering the open class. After a sixth-place finish in the October Stakes, he contested the Stayers Stakes (GII) on 4 December at Nakayama Racecourse, his first graded stakes start, and finished third behind Divine Force.

=== 2022: six-year-old season ===
He began the year with third-place finishes in the Manyo Stakes and the Hanshin Daishōten (GII). On 1 May, he contested the Tennō Shō (Spring) (GI) at Hanshin. He stumbled shortly after the start, unseating jockey Yuga Kawada. He continued to run riderless, passing the post second behind the winner Titleholder, before tripping over the outer rail. He sustained only minor abrasions.

He missed the remainder of the season with a splint bone injury in his left foreleg. After being excluded from the Copa Republica Argentina by ballot, he returned on 3 December in the Stayers Stakes at Nakayama. Ridden by Damian Lane, he advanced along the inside rail in the straight and won by 0.1 seconds from Plume d'Or, recording his first graded stakes victory. The win was the 800th JRA victory for trainer Yasutoshi Ikee.

=== 2023: seven-year-old season ===
On 25 February, Silver Sonic contested the Red Sea Turf Handicap (G3) at King Abdulaziz Racetrack in Saudi Arabia. Ridden by Damian Lane, he took the lead at the entrance of the straight and won by 2.5 lengths from Enemy, recording his first overseas victory. The win made him the third consecutive generation of his sire line, after Stay Gold and Orfevre, to win a graded stakes race outside Japan. On 30 April, he ran in the Tennō Shō (Spring) at Kyoto, finishing third behind Justin Palace and Deep Bond. A planned autumn campaign in Australia, including the Melbourne Cup, was cancelled after swelling in his left fetlock, and he did not race again that year.

=== 2024: eight-year-old season ===
Silver Sonic was entered for the Red Sea Turf Handicap but withdrew after being allocated a top weight of 61 kg. He ran in the Hanshin Daishōten on 17 March, finishing 11th, and in the Tennō Shō (Spring) on 28 April, finishing 16th. He was subsequently diagnosed with severe suspensory ligament inflammation, and his retirement was announced on 26 May 2024. His JRA registration was cancelled on 29 May 2024, and he became a riding horse at Shadai Farm. In the 2024 Idol Horse Audition, he received 23,457 votes, the most of any horse, placing first in the retired horse division.

== Race record ==
The following table details all 24 starts of Silver Sonic's racing career based on official JBIS, netkeiba, and Racing Post records. Record current as of his final start on 28 April 2024.

| Date | Distance (Condition) | Race | Class | Course | Odds (Favourite) | Field | Finish | Time | Jockey | Winning (Losing) Margin | Winner (2nd Place) | Ref |
|---|---|---|---|---|---|---|---|---|---|---|---|---|
2019 – three-year-old season
| Jan 20 | Turf 1600 m (Yielding) | 3-Y-O Newcomer | Maiden | Kyoto | 3.9 (2nd) | 16 | 2nd | 1:37.6 | Kohei Matsuyama | 0.7 | Andraste | |
| Feb 24 | Turf 1800 m (Good) | 3-Y-O Maiden | Maiden | Kokura | 3.9 (1st) | 16 | 2nd | 1:48.4 | Kota Fujioka | 0.0 | Black Badge | |
| May 12 | Turf 1800 m (Good) | 3-Y-O Maiden | Maiden | Kyoto | 1.5 (1st) | 13 | 2nd | 1:48.1 | Brenton Avdulla | 0.0 | Jun Sarobetsu | |
| Jun 2 | Turf 1800 m (Good) | 3-Y-O Maiden | Maiden | Hanshin | 1.5 (1st) | 17 | 1st | 1:48.2 | Kota Fujioka | –0.4 | (Hagino Belleequipe) | |
| Jul 27 | Turf 2000 m (Good) | Kunisaki Tokubetsu | 1-win | Kokura | 2.0 (1st) | 11 | 1st | 1:59.3 | Yuga Kawada | –0.0 | (Ritmicamente) | |
| Sep 29 | Turf 2400 m (Good) | Hyogo Tokubetsu | 2-win | Hanshin | 3.0 (1st) | 9 | 1st | 2:24.9 | Kohei Matsuyama | –0.1 | (Wissen) | |
2020 – four-year-old season
| Jan 11 | Turf 2200 m (Good) | Geishun Stakes | 3-win | Nakayama | 4.4 (2nd) | 13 | 5th | 2:15.0 | Hironobu Tanabe | 0.6 | Ocea Great | |
| Apr 19 | Turf 2400 m (Good) | Midosuji Stakes | 3-win | Hanshin | 5.7 (3rd) | 8 | 5th | 2:27.9 | Kanichiro Fujii | 1.2 | Barack Palinka | |
| May 24 | Turf 2400 m (Good) | Karasuma Stakes | 3-win | Kyoto | 12.9 (7th) | 16 | 3rd | 2:25.6 | Daisaku Matsuda | 0.7 | Miss Mamma Mia | |
| Jun 13 | Turf 2400 m (Heavy) | June Stakes | 3-win | Tokyo | 8.4 (4th) | 18 | 6th | 2:33.9 | Yutaka Take | 0.8 | Sanrei Pocket | |
2021 – five-year-old season
| Jan 31 | Turf 2200 m (Good) | Mino Stakes | 3-win | Chukyo | 26.2 (8th) | 15 | 4th | 2:14.0 | Mirai Iwata | 1.2 | Heat on Beat | |
| Feb 27 | Turf 3200 m (Good) | Shorai Stakes | 3-win | Hanshin | 18.3 (5th) | 14 | 3rd | 3:15.4 | Mirai Iwata | 0.5 | Diastima | |
| May 15 | Turf 2400 m (Good) | Ryokufu Stakes | 3-win | Tokyo | 16.8 (7th) | 11 | 3rd | 2:24.2 | Takuya Ono | 0.0 | Iron Barows | |
| Jun 12 | Turf 2400 m (Good) | June Stakes | 3-win | Tokyo | 2.8 (1st) | 11 | 1st | 2:24.6 | Christophe Lemaire | –0.1 | (Anticipate) | |
| Oct 17 | Turf 2000 m (Yielding) | October Stakes | Listed | Tokyo | 11.6 (3rd) | 18 | 6th | 2:00.6 | Shu Ishibashi | 0.6 | Panthalassa | |
| Dec 4 | Turf 3600 m (Good) | Stayers Stakes | GII | Nakayama | 6.6 (5th) | 13 | 3rd | 3:47.9 | Hiroyuki Uchida | 0.3 | Divine Force | |
2022 – six-year-old season
| Jan 5 | Turf 3000 m (Good) | Manyo Stakes | Open | Chukyo | 5.2 (2nd) | 13 | 3rd | 3:04.5 | Yuga Kawada | 0.2 | Machaon d'Or | |
| Mar 20 | Turf 3000 m (Good) | Hanshin Daishōten | GII | Hanshin | 14.5 (3rd) | 13 | 3rd | 3:05.4 | Yuga Kawada | 0.4 | Deep Bond | |
| May 1 | Turf 3200 m (Yielding) | Tennō Shō (Spring) | GI | Hanshin | 35.8 (8th) | 18 | DNF | – | Yuga Kawada | – | Titleholder | |
| Dec 3 | Turf 3600 m (Good) | Stayers Stakes | GII | Nakayama | 5.4 (3rd) | 14 | 1st | 3:46.3 | Damian Lane | –0.1 | (Plume d'Or) | |
2023 – seven-year-old season
| Feb 25 | Turf 3000 m (Good to firm) | Red Sea Turf Handicap | G3 | King Abdulaziz | 6.0 (2nd) | 13 | 1st | 3:06.46 | Damian Lane | –0.38 | (Enemy) | |
| Apr 30 | Turf 3200 m (Yielding) | Tennō Shō (Spring) | GI | Kyoto | 22.5 (6th) | 17 | 3rd | 3:16.7 | Damian Lane | 0.6 | Justin Palace | |
2024 – eight-year-old season
| Mar 17 | Turf 3000 m (Yielding) | Hanshin Daishōten | GII | Hanshin | 8.6 (4th) | 15 | 11th | 3:09.0 | Yutaka Take | 2.2 | T O Royal | |
| Apr 28 | Turf 3200 m (Good) | Tennō Shō (Spring) | GI | Kyoto | 34.6 (7th) | 17 | 16th | 3:20.0 | Mirco Demuro | 5.8 | T O Royal | |

== Pedigree ==
Pedigree of Silver Sonic (JPN)
| Sire Orfevre (JPN) 2008 | Stay Gold (JPN); 1994 | Sunday Silence (USA) | Halo |
| Sire Orfevre (JPN) 2008 | Stay Gold (JPN); 1994 | Sunday Silence (USA) | Wishing Well |
| Sire Orfevre (JPN) 2008 | Stay Gold (JPN); 1994 | Golden Sash (JPN) | Dictus |
| Sire Orfevre (JPN) 2008 | Stay Gold (JPN); 1994 | Golden Sash (JPN) | Dyna Sash |
| Sire Orfevre (JPN) 2008 | Oriental Art (JPN); 1997 | Mejiro McQueen (JPN) | Mejiro Titian |
| Sire Orfevre (JPN) 2008 | Oriental Art (JPN); 1997 | Mejiro McQueen (JPN) | Mejiro Aurora |
| Sire Orfevre (JPN) 2008 | Oriental Art (JPN); 1997 | Electro Art (JPN) | Northern Taste |
| Sire Orfevre (JPN) 2008 | Oriental Art (JPN); 1997 | Electro Art (JPN) | Grandma Stevens |
| Dam Air Thule (JPN) 1997 | Tony Bin (IRE); 1983 | Kampala (GB) | Kalamoun |
| Dam Air Thule (JPN) 1997 | Tony Bin (IRE); 1983 | Kampala (GB) | State Pension |
| Dam Air Thule (JPN) 1997 | Tony Bin (IRE); 1983 | Severn Bridge (GB) | Hornbeam |
| Dam Air Thule (JPN) 1997 | Tony Bin (IRE); 1983 | Severn Bridge (GB) | Priddy Fair |
| Dam Air Thule (JPN) 1997 | Ski Paradise (USA); 1990 | Lyphard (USA) | Northern Dancer |
| Dam Air Thule (JPN) 1997 | Ski Paradise (USA); 1990 | Lyphard (USA) | Goofed |
| Dam Air Thule (JPN) 1997 | Ski Paradise (USA); 1990 | Ski Goggle (USA) | Royal Ski |
| Dam Air Thule (JPN) 1997 | Ski Paradise (USA); 1990 | Ski Goggle (USA) | Mississippi Siren |

- Silver Sonic is inbred 5 × 4 to Northern Taste and 5 × 4 to Northern Dancer.
- His dam Air Thule won the Hanshin Himba Stakes (GII).
- His half-brother Captain Thule won the Satsuki Shō, and his half-sister Ultima Thule won the Centaur Stakes and the Silk Road Stakes.
- His granddam Ski Paradise won the Moulin de Longchamp (FR G1) and the Keio Hai Spring Cup (GII).
- His great-granddam Ski Goggle won the Acorn Stakes (USA G1).

== See also ==
- Thoroughbred racing in Japan
- Admire Terra
