= Mejiro McQueen =

Japanese-bred Thoroughbred racehorse

Mejiro McQueen メジロマックイーン
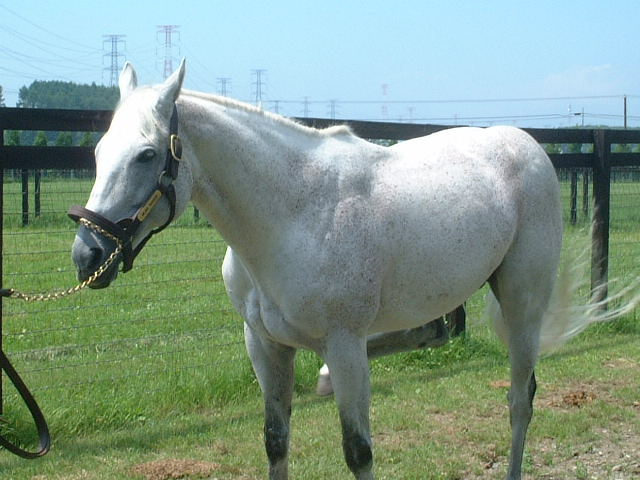
- Mejiro McQueen at Shadai Stallion Station in 2002.
- Breed: Thoroughbred
- Sire: Mejiro Titan (JPN)
- Grandsire: Mejiro Asama (JPN)
- Dam: Mejiro Aurora (JPN)
- Damsire: Remand (GB)
- Sex: Stallion
- Foaled: April 3, 1987
- Died: April 3, 2006 (aged 19)
- Country: Japan
- Colour: Grey
- Breeder: Katashi Yoshida
- Owner: Mejiro Shouji Co., Ltd.
- Racing colors
- Trainer: Yasuo Ikee
- Jockey: Yoshiyuki Muramoto; Koichi Uchida; Yutaka Take
- Record: 21: 12-6-1
- Earnings: ¥1,014,657,700

Major wins
- Hanshin Daishoten (1991, 1992); Tenno Sho (Spring) (1991,1992); Kyōto Daishōten (1991, 1993); Sankei Ōsaka Hai (1993); Takarazuka Kinen (1993); Japanese Classic Race wins: Kikuka Sho (1990)

Awards
- JRA Award for Best Older Male Horse (1991)

Honours
- Japan Racing Association Hall of Fame (1994)

Mejiro McQueen (Japanese: メジロマックイーン, Hepburn: Mejiro Makkuīn; April 3, 1987 – April 3, 2006) was a Japanese Thoroughbred racehorse and sire. He was a late-maturing horse who did not emerge as a top-class performer until the autumn of his three-year-old season when he won the Kikuka Sho. Over the next three years he proved himself one of the best stayers in Japan with wins in the Tenno Sho (twice), Takarazuka Kinen, Sankei Ōsaka Hai, Kyōto Daishōten (twice) and Hanshin Daishoten (twice). He won the JRA Award for Best Older Male Horse in 1991 and was inducted into the Japan Racing Association Hall of Fame shortly after his retirement from racing.

== Background ==
Mejiro McQueen was a grey horse bred in Japan by Katashi Yoshida. During his racing career he was owned by Mejiro Shouji Co Ltd and trained by Yasuo Ikee.

Mejiro McQueen was sired by Mejiro Titan, who won the Autumn Tenno Sho in 1982. His dam Mejiro Aurora showed modest racing ability, winning one minor race from 24 starts but was more prevalent as a broodmare and also produced the Kikuka Sho winner Mejiro Durren. She descended from the British broodmare Astonishment, who was imported to Japan in the first decade of the 20th century.

His name came from the crown name Mejiro and combined with a suffix from an American actor, Steve McQueen.

== Racing career ==
Mejiro McQueen did not race as a two-year-old but made a successful racecourse debut over 1700 metres on dirt in February 1990 at Hanshin Racecourse. He was beaten in his next three starts before taking two minor races at Hakodate Racecourse in September. On 4 November at Kyoto Racecourse he recorded his first major success in his last run of the year when he took the 3000 metre Kikuka Sho.

On his first appearance as a four-year-old, Mejiro McQueen won the Grade 2 Hanshin Daishoten at Chukyo Racecourse, setting a record time of 3:07.3 for the 3000 metre turf course. In April at Kyoto he took his second Grade 1 prize as he won the spring edition of the Tenno Sho over 3200 metres. When dropped in trip for the Takarazuka Kinen over 2200 metres in June he ran well again, but was beaten by Mejiro Ryan, falling into second place. After the customary summer break, he returned in October to win the Grade 2 Kyoto Daishoten and then finished first in the autumn Tenno Sho. In the latter race, however, he was disqualified and placed last of the eighteen runners; he had been drawn outside and hampered several horses when his jockey tracked over to the inside rail just after the start. He put up good efforts in defeat on his last two starts that year, coming home fourth behind the American horse Golden Pheasant in the Japan Cup and finishing a close second to Dai Yusaku in the Arima Kinen. In the JRA Awards for 1991 he was voted the year's Best Older Male Horse.

Mejiro McQueen's 1992 campaign was restricted to two races, but he won them both. He began by taking the Hanshin Daishoten for the second successive year. On 26 April at Kyoto he followed up his 1991 success by winning the spring Tenno Sho for a second time. Injury complications kept the horse off the track for the rest of the year.

After an absence of more than eleven months, Mejiro McQueen returned in April 1993 and won the Grade 2 Osaka Hai at Hanshin with a record time of 2:03.2. His attempt to win an unprecedented third edition of the spring Tenno Sho narrowly failed as he finished second of the fifteen runners behind Rice Shower. On 13 June at Hanshin he won the Takarazuka Kinen at the second attempt to record his fourth Grade 1 success. He returned in October to win a second Kyoto Daishoten in a record time of 2:22.7 in what proved to be his final start. After winning the Kyoto Daishoten, McQueen was diagnosed with degenerative suspensory ligament desmitis just four days before he was scheduled to run in the Autumn Tenno Sho. This ultimately proved to be the reason why he retired in Autumn 1993.

Throughout Mejiro McQueen's racing career, spanning from 1990 to 1993, his record was 21 starts, 12 first place finishes, 6 second place finishes, 1 third place finish, and 2 other place finishes, his total earnings garnering ¥1,014,657,700 JPY. McQueen was the first horse to win over a billion yen, and in 1994, Mejiro McQueen was inducted into the Japan Racing Association Hall of Fame.

== Stud record ==
Mejiro McQueen retired from racing, becoming a breeding stallion at Shadai Stallion Station. He sired the Grade 3 winners Time Fair Lady and Eidai Queen. He performed a valuable service at stud as he formed a close bond with Sunday Silence and acted as a calming influence on the hitherto obstreperous American stallion. Mejiro McQueen's daughters did well as broodmares and he was the damsire of Dream Journey, Orfevre and Gold Ship. He died of heart failure in 2006 on his 19th birthday.

=== Notable progeny ===
The data below is based on JBIS Stallion Reports.

c = colt, f = filly, g = gelding

**Foaled**	**Name**	**Sex**	**Major Wins**
1995	Eidai Queen	f	Daily Hai Queen Cup
1998	Time Fair Lady	f	Flower Cup
2002	Yamaninmerveilleux	f	Queen Stakes, Nakayama Himba Stakes
2004	Hokuto Sultan	c	Meguro Kinen
2006	Dear Geena	f	Daily Hai Queen Cup, Flora Stakes

==== Broodmare sire ====
The data below is based on JBIS BMS Reports.

bold = grade 1 stakes

- Dream Journey (2004) : Kokura Kinen, Asahi Challenge Cup, Kobe Shimbun Hai, Sankei Osaka Hai, **Asahi Hai Futurity Stakes, Takarazuka Kinen, Arima Kinen** (by Stay Gold)
- Taisei Legend (2007) : Cluster Cup, Tokyo Hai, **JBC Sprint** (by King Kamehameha)
- Fateful War (2008) : Keisei Hai, St. Lite Kinen (by Stay Gold)
- Orfevre (2008) : Prix Foy (2x), Spring Stakes, Kobe Shimbun Hai, Sankei Osaka Hai, **Satsuki Sho, Tokyo Yushun, Kikuka Sho, Takarazuka Kinen, Arima Kinen** (2x) (by Stay Gold)
- Gold Ship (2009) : Kyodo Tsushin Hai, Kobe Shimbun Hai, Hanshin Daishoten (3x), **Satsuki Sho, Kikuka Sho, Takarazuka Kinen** (2x), **Arima Kinen, Tenno Sho (Spring)** (by Stay Gold)
- Hula Bride (2009) : Nakayama Himba Stakes, Aichi Hai (by Gold Allure)
- Love is Boo Shet (2009) : Hakodate Kinen (by Manhattan Cafe)

== In popular culture ==
An anthropomorphized version of Mejiro McQueen appears as a character in the Japanese multimedia franchise Umamusume: Pretty Derby, voiced by Saori Ōnishi. She is depicted as a petite, lavender-haired young woman of the prestigious Mejiro family who, despite initially appearing snobbish and aloof at first glance, is responsible and kindhearted. While she seemingly appears unbothered by most things, she secretly harbors a major sweet tooth, and is often the subject of various antics from her classmate, Gold Ship, which leave her rather irritated. She serves as the main protagonist of the second season of the anime alongside Tokai Teio, while being one of the protagonists in the first and third seasons of the anime.

== Racing statistics ==
Date	Age	Track	Race	Grade	Type/Distance	Field	Finish	Time	Jockey	Winner (2nd Place)
February 3, 1990	3	Hanshin	Debut	Maiden	Dirt 1700m	10	1st	1:47.7	Yoshiyuki Muramoto	(Hagino Legend)
February 25, 1990	3	Hanshin	Yukiyanagi Sho		Turf 2000m	13	2nd	2:04.6	Yoshiyuki Muramoto	Symboli Deva
May 12, 1990	3	Kyoto	Ayame Sho		Turf 1800m	15	3rd	2:17.5	Yoshiyuki Muramoto	Houyu Royal
September 2, 1990	3	Hakodate	Oshima Special		Dirt 1700m	10	2nd	1:46.6	Koichi Uchida	Manjuden Kabuto
September 16, 1990	3	Hakodate	Kikonai Special		Dirt 1700m	8	1st	1:47.3	Koichi Uchida	(Rixan Royal)
September 23, 1990	3	Hakodate	Onuma Stakes	OP	Turf 2000m	14	1st	2:04.5	Koichi Uchida	(Tosho Eye)
October 13, 1990	3	Kyoto	Arashiyama Stakes	OP	Turf 3000m	9	2nd	3:06.6	Koichi Uchida	Mister Adams
November 4, 1990	3	Kyoto	Kikuka Sho	G1	Turf 3000m	17	1st	R3:06.2	Koichi Uchida	(White Stone)
March 10, 1991	4	Chukyo	Hanshin Daishoten	G2	Turf 3000m	9	1st	R3:07.3	Yutaka Take	(Go Sign)
April 28, 1991	4	Kyoto	Tenno Sho (Spring)	G1	Turf 3200m	18	1st	3:18.8	Yutaka Take	(Mister Adams)
June 9, 1991	4	Kyoto	Takarazuka Kinen	G1	Turf 2200m	10	2nd	2:13.8	Yutaka Take	Mejiro Ryan
October 6, 1991	4	Kyoto	Kyoto Daishoten	G2	Turf 2400m	7	1st	2:26.5	Yutaka Take	(Meisho Vitoria)
October 27, 1991	4	Tokyo	Tenno Sho (Autumn)	G1	Turf 2000m	18	18th (Note: Demoted from 1st place due to the penalty.)	2:02.9	Yutaka Take	Prekrasnie
November 24, 1991	4	Tokyo	Japan Cup	G1	Turf 2400m	15	4th	2:25.3	Yutaka Take	Golden Pheasant
December 22, 1991	4	Nakayama	Arima Kinen	G1	Turf 2500m	15	2nd	2:30.8	Yutaka Take	Dai Yusaku
March 15, 1992	5	Hanshin	Hanshin Daishoten	G2	Turf 3000m	6	1st	3:13.8	Yutaka Take	(Kamino Cresse)
April 26, 1992	5	Kyoto	Tenno Sho (Spring)	G1	Turf 3200m	14	1st	3:20.0	Yutaka Take	(Kamino Cresse)
April 4, 1993	6	Hanshin	Sankei Osaka Hai	G2	Turf 2000m	16	1st	R2:03.3	Yutaka Take	(Nice Nature)
April 25, 1993	6	Kyoto	Tenno Sho (Spring)	G1	Turf 3200m	15	2nd	3:17.5	Yutaka Take	Rice Shower
June 13, 1993	6	Hanshin	Takarazuka Kinen	G1	Turf 2200m	11	1st	2:17.7	Yutaka Take	(Ikuno Dictus)
October 10, 1993	6	Kyoto	Kyoto Daishoten	G2	Turf 2400m	11	1st	R2:22.7	Yutaka Take	(Legacy World)

== Pedigree ==
Pedigree of Mejiro McQueen
Sire Mejiro Titan	Mejiro Asama	Partholon	Milesian
Sire Mejiro Titan	Mejiro Asama	Partholon	Paleo
Sire Mejiro Titan	Mejiro Asama	Sweet Sixteen	First Fiddle
Sire Mejiro Titan	Mejiro Asama	Sweet Sixteen	Blue Eyed Momo
Sire Mejiro Titan	Cheryl	Snob	Mourne
Sire Mejiro Titan	Cheryl	Snob	Senones
Sire Mejiro Titan	Cheryl	Chanel	Pan
Sire Mejiro Titan	Cheryl	Chanel	Barley Corn
Dam Mejiro Aurora	Remand	Alcide	Alycidon
Dam Mejiro Aurora	Remand	Alcide	Chenille
Dam Mejiro Aurora	Remand	Admonish	Palestine
Dam Mejiro Aurora	Remand	Admonish	Warning
Dam Mejiro Aurora	Mejiro Iris	Hindostan	Bois Roussel
Dam Mejiro Aurora	Mejiro Iris	Hindostan	Sonibai
Dam Mejiro Aurora	Mejiro Iris	Asama Yuri	Bostonian
Dam Mejiro Aurora	Mejiro Iris	Asama Yuri	Tomoe (Family 7-c)

== See also ==
- List of racehorses
