= Tsurumaru Tsuyoshi =

Japanese Thoroughbred racehorse (1995–2026)

Tsurumaru Tsuyoshi ツルマルツヨシ
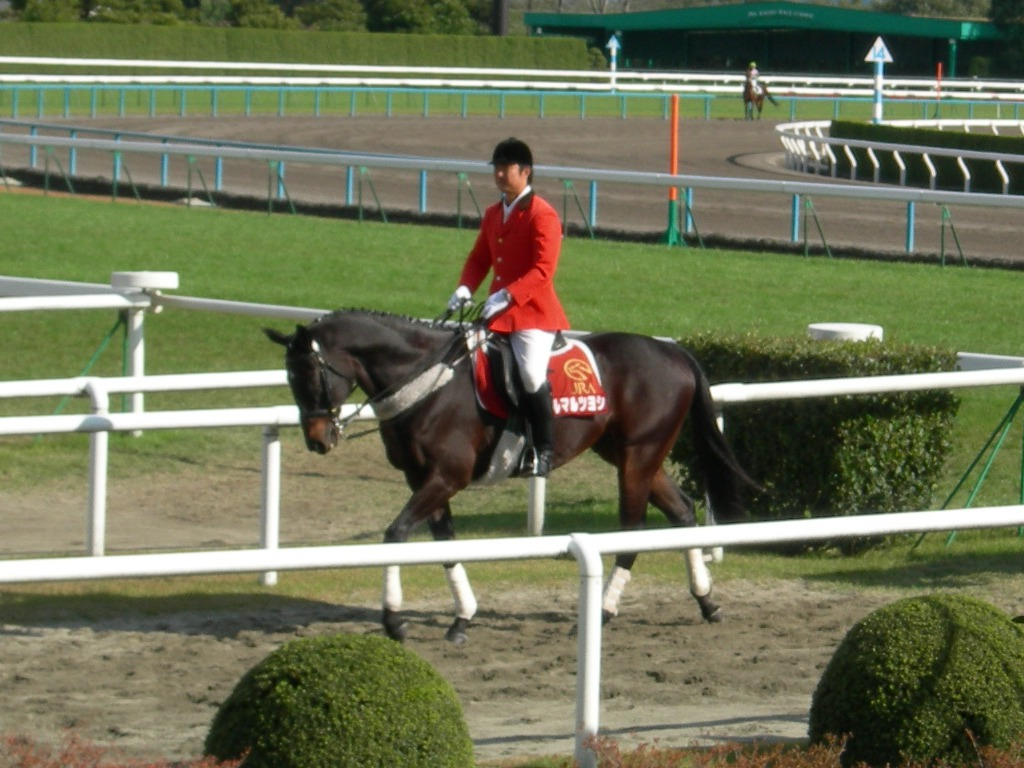
- Tsurumaru Tsuyoshi as a lead horse at Kyoto Racecourse in 2006.
- Breed: Thoroughbred
- Sire: Symboli Rudolf
- Grandsire: Partholon
- Dam: Sweet Cielo
- Damsire: Conquistador Cielo
- Sex: Stallion
- Foaled: 6 April 1995
- Died: 2 August 2026 (aged 31)
- Country: Japan
- Colour: Dark Bay
- Breeder: Symboli Stud
- Owner: Takao Tsuruda
- Racing colours
- Trainer: Hisao Nibun
- Jockey: S. Fujita; T. Sato
- Record: 11: 5-0-1
- Earnings: ¥174,280,000

Major wins
- Asahi Challenge Cup (1999); Kyoto Daishoten (1999)

Tsurumaru Tsuyoshi (Japanese: ツルマルツヨシ, Hepburn: Tsurumaru Tsuyoshi; 6 April 1995 – 2 August 2026) was a Japanese Thoroughbred racehorse active from 1998 to 2000. He was considered the last big star of Symboli Rudolf's progeny, following Tokai Teio and Ayrton Symboli. His most notable wins include the 1999 Asahi Challenge Cup and Kyoto Daishoten.

== Background ==
Tsurumaru Tsuyoshi was foaled on 6 April 1995 at Symboli Farm. His sire, Symboli Rudolf, won the Japanese Triple Crown undefeated and sired numerous other graded winners including Tokai Teio. His dam Sweet Cielo was a daughter of Conquistador Cielo who won several graded races including the 1982 Belmont Stakes and Met Mile.

== Racing career ==
Tsurumaru Tsuyoshi made his debut in 1998 in a race for 4-year-olds without a win at Kyoto Racecourse, securing a victory in his first start. Afterward, partly due to his delicate constitution, he alternated between racing and rest periods; however, starting in the summer of 1999—when he turned 5—he began to compete consistently, winning the Asahi Challenge Cup in the fall and becoming a graded stakes winner. In his next start, the Kyoto Daishoten, he defeated top contenders such as Mejiro Bright, T. M. Opera O, Stay Gold, and Special Week to claim victory. In the Tenno Sho (Autumn), he was backed as the second favorite to win and emerged as one of the leading contenders on the GI circuit; however, after finishing fourth in the 44th Arima Kinen that same year, he developed an osteochondroma and entered another long layoff, not returning to racing until the following fall. In the Arima Kinen, his second consecutive appearance in the race, he was withdrawn from the race on the final straight. He had ruptured the suspensory ligament in his left front leg and was diagnosed as having lost his ability to race, leading to the decision to retire him from racing.

== Retirement and death ==
Upon retirement, the decision was made not to have Tsurumaru Tsuyoshi become a breeding stallion. After recuperating at the Miyazaki Convalescent Center, he underwent castration surgery, followed by training to transition to a lead horse at Kyoto Racecourse. In 2002, he made his debut as a lead horse on the opening day of the 5th Kyoto racing meet, even leading the Kyoto Daishoten, much to the delight of fans. Ultimately, the condition of Tsurumaru Tsuyoshi's legs became a cause for concern among staff, and he retired from the position at the conclusion of the 4th Kyoto meet in 2007.

Upon his second retirement, with funding from the Retired Racehorse Care and Exhibition Program, he spent some time at a riding club in Miyazaki City, Miyazaki Prefecture. Beginning in 2012, he was supported by the Tsurumaru Tsuyoshi Association, established by Shigeo Nakanishi, with others who had served as his stablehands during his racing career. In November 2017, he was moved to Yoshino Ranch in Aya Town, Higashimorokata District, Miyazaki Prefecture, where he was kept until his passing.

Tsurumaru Tsuyoshi died on 2 August 2026, at Yoshino Ranch, where he was grazing. He was 31. Nakanishi announced the news of his death on his blog that afternoon.

== In popular culture ==
An anthropomorphized version of Tsurumaru Tsuyoshi appears as a character in the Japanese multimedia franchise Umamusume: Pretty Derby, voiced by Yoshino Aoyama. She is depicted with a weak constitution with health problems like her real-life counterpart, although often exaggerated for comedic effect.

== Racing form ==
The following racing form is based on information available on JBIS search and netkeiba.com.

Date	Age	Racecourse	Race	Grade	Distance	Gate	Odds	Fav.	Fin.	Time	Margin	Jockey	Winner (Runner-Up)
2 May 1998	2	Kyoto	Four-Year-Old Maiden	Maiden	1800m	5	6.7	5	1st	1:25.6	-0.2	S.Fujita	(T.M.Tiger)
9 Nov 1998	2	Kyoto	Osakayama Tokubetsu	Pre-OP	1800m	4	18.5	8	5th	1:47.3	0.4	S.Fujita	Sunday Sarah
28 Nov 1998	2	Chukyo	Inuyama Tokubetsu	Pre-OP	2000m	10	5.2	2	1st	2:02.1	-0.6	T.Sato	(State Fellow)
17 Jan 1999	3	Kyoto	Inari Tokubetsu	Pre-OP	2000m	4	Scratched					S.Fujita	Suehiro Commander
6 Jun 1999	3	Chukyo	Mikawa Tokubetsu	Pre-OP	1800m	8	2.3	1	1st	1:48.8	-0.4	S.Fujita	(Elegant More)
25 Jul 1999	3	Kokura	Kitakyushu Kinen	G3	1800m	4	5.9	3	3rd	1:46.0	0.4	S.Fujita	Eishin Vincennes
12 Sep 1999	3	Hanshin	Asahi Challenge Cup	G3	2000m	1	7.0	5	1st	1:59.5	-0.2	S.Fujita	(Meisho Odo)
10 Oct 1999	3	Kyoto	Kyoto Daishoten	G2	2400m	4	13.4	4	1st	2:24.3	-0.1	S.Fujita	(Mejiro Bright)
31 Oct 1999	3	Tokyo	Tenno Sho (Autumn)	G1	2000m	17	6.0	2	8th	1:58.6	0.6	S.Fujita	Special Week
26 Dec 1999	3	Nakayama	Arima Kinen	G1	2500m	10	12.1	6	4th	2:37.3	0.1	S.Fujita	Grass Wonder
8 Oct 2000	4	Kyoto	Kyoto Daishoten	G2	2400m	9	11.9	3	6th	2:26.7	0.7	S.Fujita	T. M. Opera O
24 Dec 2000	4	Nakayama	Arima Kinen	G1	2500m	1	13.1	4	DNF			S.Fujita	T. M. Opera O

Legend
Turf Dirt

== Pedigree ==
Pedigree of Tsurumaru Tsuyoshi
Sire Symboli Rudolf 1981	Partholon; 1960	Milesian; 1953	My Babu; 1945
Sire Symboli Rudolf 1981	Partholon; 1960	Milesian; 1953	Oatflake; 1942
Sire Symboli Rudolf 1981	Partholon; 1960	Paleo; 1953	Pharis; 1936
Sire Symboli Rudolf 1981	Partholon; 1960	Paleo; 1953	Colonice; 1940
Sire Symboli Rudolf 1981	Sweet Luna; 1972	Speed Symboli; 1963	Royal Challenger; 1951
Sire Symboli Rudolf 1981	Sweet Luna; 1972	Speed Symboli; 1963	Sweet Inn; 1958
Sire Symboli Rudolf 1981	Sweet Luna; 1972	Dance Time; 1957	Palestine; 1947
Sire Symboli Rudolf 1981	Sweet Luna; 1972	Dance Time; 1957	Samaritaine; 1949
Dam Sweet Cielo 1987	Conquistador Cielo; 1979	Mr. Prospector; 1970	Raise a Native; 1961
Dam Sweet Cielo 1987	Conquistador Cielo; 1979	Mr. Prospector; 1970	Gold Digger; 1962
Dam Sweet Cielo 1987	Conquistador Cielo; 1979	K D Princess; 1971	Bold Commander; 1960
Dam Sweet Cielo 1987	Conquistador Cielo; 1979	K D Princess; 1971	Tammy's Turn; 1965
Dam Sweet Cielo 1987	Change Water; 1969	Swaps; 1952	Khaled; 1943
Dam Sweet Cielo 1987	Change Water; 1969	Swaps; 1952	Iron Reward; 1946
Dam Sweet Cielo 1987	Change Water; 1969	Portage; 1952	War Admiral; 1934
Dam Sweet Cielo 1987	Change Water; 1969	Portage; 1952	Carillon; 1939
