= Ōsaka Hai =

Osaka Hai
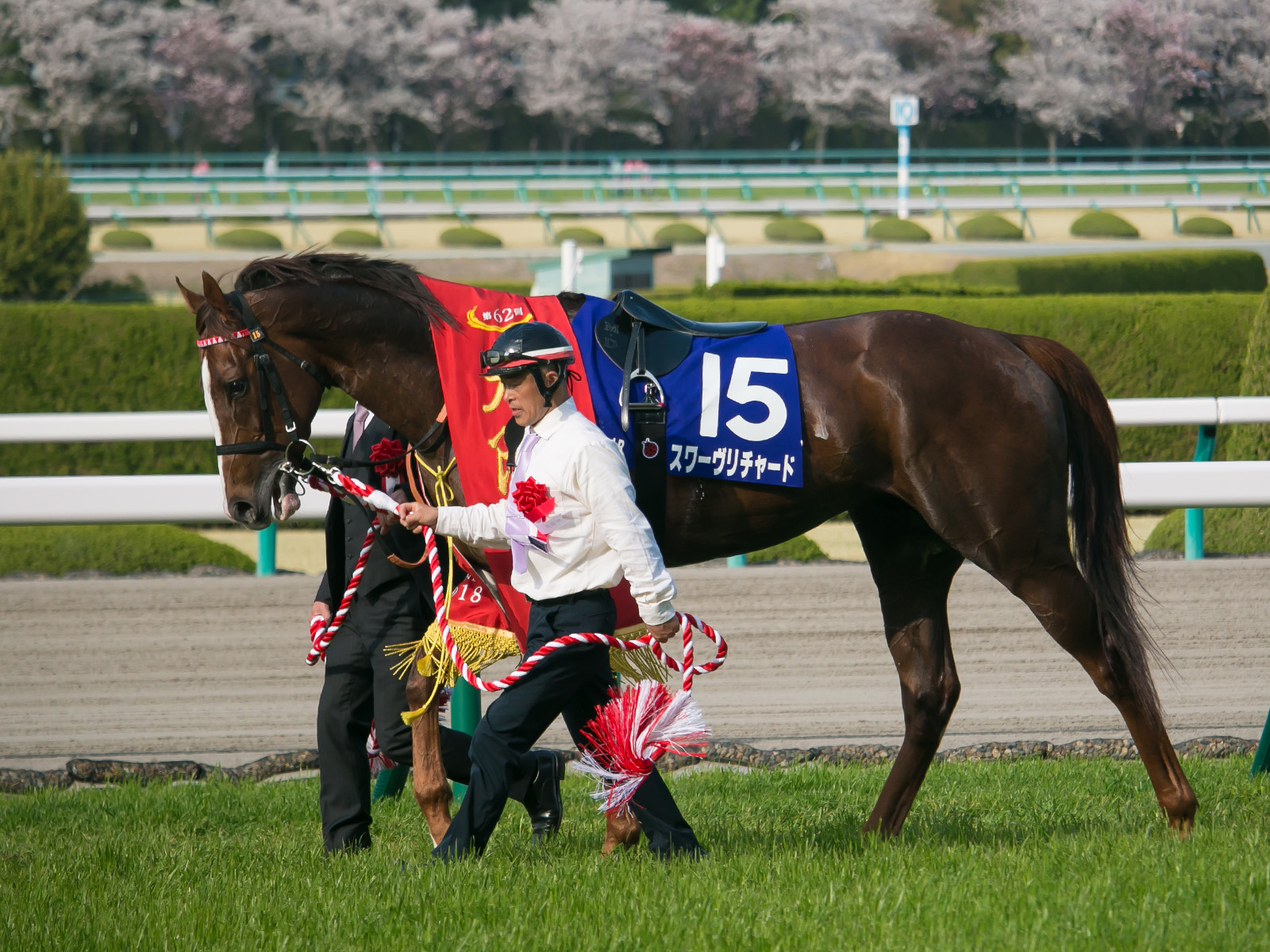
- Suave Richard after winning the 2018 Osaka Hai
- Class: Grade 1
- Location: Hanshin Racecourse, Takarazuka, Hyogo
- Inaugurated: March 17, 1957
- Race type: Thoroughbred Flat racing

Race information
- Distance: 2000 metres
- Surface: Turf
- Track: Right-handed
- Qualification: 4-y-o +
- Weight: 4-y-o & up 58 kg Allowances; 2 kg for fillies and mares
- Purse: ¥ 648,000,000 (as of 2025): 1st: ¥ 300,000,000; 2nd: ¥ 120,000,000; 3rd: ¥ 75,000,000
- Bonuses: Winner of the following in the same year: Ōsaka Hai, Tennō Shō (Spring), Takarazuka Kinen; Domestic: ¥ 300,000,000; International: ¥ 150,000,000; Winner of any three of the following in the same year: Ōsaka Hai, Tennō Shō (Spring/Autumn), Japan Cup, Takarazuka Kinen, Arima Kinen; Domestic: ¥ 200,000,000; International: ¥ 100,000,000

The Ōsaka Hai (大阪杯) is a Grade 1 horse race in Japan for Thoroughbred colts and fillies aged four and over run over a distance of 2,000 metres at Hanshin Racecourse. The race is also known as the Sankei Ōsaka Hai (産経大阪杯) (until 2016) and the Ōsaka Cup. The race is run in early April.

It was first run in 1957 over 1800 metres. The distance was increased to 1900 metres in 1966 before the race was run over its current distance for the first time in 1972.

Among the winners of the race have been Katsuragi Ace, Tokai Teio, Mejiro McQueen, Air Groove, Neo Universe, Meisho Samson, Daiwa Scarlet, Orfevre and Kizuna.

The Ōsaka Hai was promoted from Grade 2 status (as it has been since 1984) to Grade 1 in 2017. Prior to 2017, the race was known as the Sankei Ōsaka Hai and served as a trial race for the spring edition of the Tenno Sho. From 2017 the winner will have a guaranteed and complimentary entry to that season's Irish Champion Stakes.

== Trial races ==
Trial races provide automatic berths to the winning horses.

Race	Grade	Racecourse	Distance	Condition
Nakayama Kinen	GII	Nakayama	1,800 metres	Winner
Kinko Sho	GII	Chukyo	2,000 metres	Winner

== Records ==
Speed record:

- Fastest: Bellagio Opera (2025): 1:56.2
- Slowest: Tokai Teio (1992): 2:06.3

Most wins by horse:

- 2 — Sunrise Pegasus: (2002, 2005)
- 2 — Bellagio Opera: (2024, 2025)

Most wins by jockey:

- 6 — Yutaka Take: Mejiro McQueen (1993), Marvelous Sunday (1997), Air Groove (1998), Kizuna (2014), Kitasan Black (2017), Jack d'Or (2023)

Most wins by trainer:

- 3 — Yasutoshi Ikee: Dream Journey (2009), Orfevre (2013), Al Ain (2019)

Most wins by owner:

- 5 — Sunday Racing: Dream Journey (2009), Orfevre (2013), Al Ain (2019), Lucky Lilac (2020), Croix Du Nord (2026)

== Winners since 1992 ==
Year	Winner	Age	Jockey	Trainer	Owner	Time
Sankei Ōsaka Hai (Grade 2)
1992	Tokai Teio	4	Yukio Okabe	Shoichi Matsumoto	Masanori Uchimura	2:06.3
1993	Mejiro McQueen	6	Yutaka Take	Yasuo Ikee	Mejiro Shoji	2:03.3
1994	Nehai Caesar	4	Katsumi Shiomura	Tadashi Fuse	Daimaru Kigyo	2:01.2
1995	Inter My Way	5	Mikio Matsunaga	Hitoshi Nakamura	Tomee Matsuoka	1:59.3
1996	Taiki Blizzard	5	Yukio Okabe	Kazuo Fujisawa	Taiki Farm	2:00.7
1997	Marvelous Sunday	5	Yutaka Take	Makoto Osawa	Sadao Sasahara	2:02.0
1998	Air Groove	5	Yutaka Take	Yuji Ito	Lucky Field	2:01.3
1999	Silent Hunter	6	Yutaka Yoshida	Yokichi Okubo	Hiroyoshi Usuda	1:59.9
2000	Meisho Odo	5	Yuji Iida	Ahihiro Iida	Yoshio Matsumoto	2:00.8
2001	Toho Dream	4	Katsumi Ando	Yoshiyasu Tajima	Toho Bussan	1:58.4
2002	Sunrise Pegasus	4	Katsumi Ando	Sei Ishizaka	Takao Matsuoka	1:59.1
2003	Tagano My Bach	4	Katsumi Ando	Hiroyoshi Matsuda	Ryoji Yagi	1:59.1
2004	Neo Universe	4	Mirco Demuro	Tsutomo Setoguchi	Shadai Race Horse	1:59.6
2005	Sunrise Pegasus	7	Hideaki Miyuki	Sei Ishizaka	Takao Matsuoka	1:59.0
2006	Company	5	Yuichi Fukunaga	Hidetaki Otonashi	Eiko Kondo	2:04.5
2007	Meisho Samson	4	Mamoru Ishibashi	Shigetada Takahashi	Yoshio Matsumoto	2:01.4
2008	Daiwa Scarlet	4	Katsumi Ando	Kunihide Matsuda	Keizo Oshiro	1:58.7
2009	Dream Journey	5	Kenichi Ikezoe	Yasutoshi Ikee	Sunday Racing	1:59.7
2010	T M Encore	6	Suguru Hamanaka	Masami Shibata	Masatsugu Takezono	1:59.5
2011	Hiruno d'Amour	4	Shinji Fujita	Mitsugu Kon	Masafumi Hirukawa	1:57.8
2012	Shonan Mighty	4	Suguru Hamanaka	Tomoyuki Umeda	Tetsuhide Kunimoto	2:05.5
2013	Orfevre	5	Kenichi Ikezoe	Yasutoshi Ikee	Sunday Racing	1:59.0
2014	Kizuna	4	Yutaka Take	Shozo Sasaki	Shinji Maeda	2:00.3
2015	Lachesis	5	Christophe Lemaire	Katsuhiko Sumii	Masaya Oshima	2:02.9
2016	Ambitious	4	Norihiro Yokoyama	Hidetaka Otonashi	Eiko Kondo	1:59.3
Ōsaka Hai (Grade 1)
2017	Kitasan Black	5	Yutaka Take	Hisashi Shimizu	Ono Shoji	1:58.9
2018	Suave Richard	4	Mirco Demuro	Yasushi Shono	NICKS	1:58.2
2019	Al Ain	5	Yuichi Kitamura	Yasutoshi Ikee	Sunday Racing	2:01.0
2020	Lucky Lilac	5	Mirco Demuro	Mikio Matsunaga	Sunday Racing	1:58.4
2021	Lei Papale	4	Yuga Kawada	Tomokazu Takano	Carrot Farm	2:01.6
2022	Potager	5	Hayato Yoshida	Yasuo Tomomichi	Makoto Kaneko	1:58.4
2023	Jack d'Or	5	Yutaka Take	Kenichi Fujioka	Toshiyuki Maehara	1:57.4
2024	Bellagio Opera	4	Kazuo Yokoyama	Hiroyuki Uemura	Shorai Hayashida	1:58.2
2025	Bellagio Opera	5	Kazuo Yokoyama	Hiroyuki Uemura	Shorai Hayashida	1:56.2 (Note: Set the current track record)
2026	Croix Du Nord	4	Yuichi Kitamura	Takashi Saito	Sunday Racing	1:57.6

== Earlier winners ==
- 1957 – Homare Ichi
- 1958 – Katsura Homare
- 1959 – Kiyo Sugata
- 1960 – Wildeal
- 1961 – Kodame
- 1962 – Sugihime
- 1963 – Ryu Z
- 1964 – Tetsuno O
- 1965 – Young Hero
- 1966 – Ballymoss Nisei
- 1967 – Ryu Pharos
- 1968 – Yama Pit
- 1969 – Date Horai
- 1970 – Shunsaku O
- 1971 – Tokino Shin O
- 1972 – Kei Takashi
- 1973 – Takuma O
- 1974 – Nihon Pillow Moutiers
- 1975 – Sky Leader
- 1976 – Long Hawk
- 1977 – Gold Eagle
- 1978 – King Lanark
- 1979 – Metro Jumbo
- 1980 – Hashi Kranz
- 1981 – Sancy Doll
- 1982 – Sanei Tholon
- 1983 – Hikari Duel
- 1984 – Katsuragi Ace
- 1985 – State Jaguar
- 1986 – Sakura Yutaka O
- 1987 – Nishino Raiden
- 1988 – Fresh Voice
- 1989 – Yaeno Muteki
- 1990 – Super Creek
- 1991 – White Stone

== See also ==
- Horse racing in Japan
- List of Japanese flat horse races
