= Challenge Cup (horse race) =

Horse race in Japan

Challenge Cup チャレンジカップ
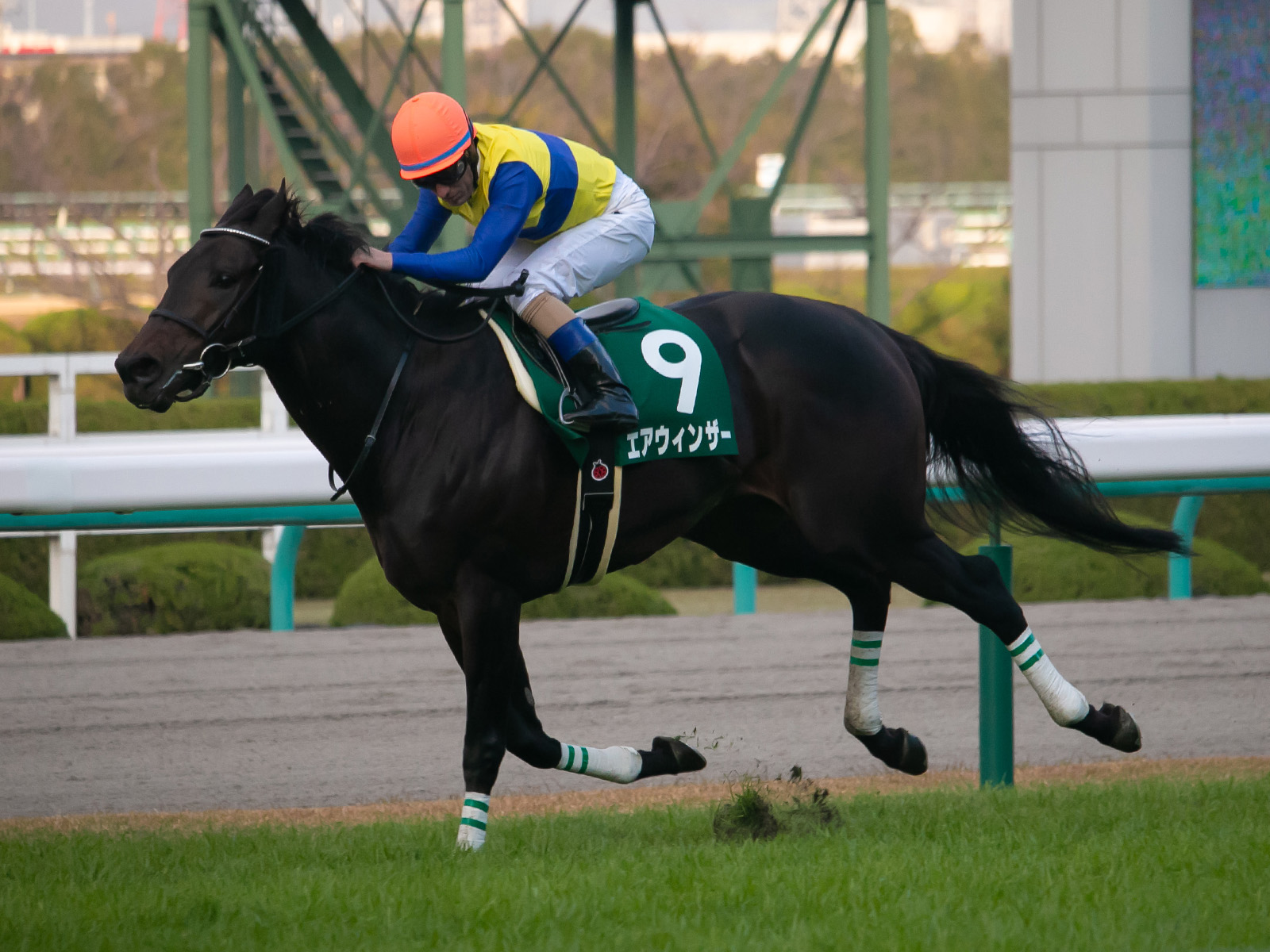
- Air Windsor wins the 2018 Challenge Cup
- Class: Grade 3
- Location: Hanshin Racecourse
- Inaugurated: 1950
- Race type: Thoroughbred Flat racing

Race information
- Distance: 2000 metres
- Surface: Turf
- Track: Right-handed
- Qualification: 3-y-o+
- Weight: Handicap
- Purse: ¥ 92,980,000 (as of 2024): 1st: ¥ 43,000,000; 2nd: ¥ 17,000,000; 3rd: ¥ 11,000,000

The Challenge Cup (チャレンジカップ) is a Japanese Grade 3 horse race for Thoroughbreds aged three and over, run in September over a distance of 2000 metres on turf at Hanshin Racecourse.

The Challenge Cup was first run in 1950 and has held Grade 3 status since 1984. The race was run at Kyoto Racecourse in 1966 and 1995 and at Chukyo Racecourse in 1979, 1990, 1991, 1994 and 2006. It was run over 1800 metres from 2012 to 2016. The race was held in November or December for most years, but from 2025 the race is held in September. The race was also changed to a handicap race.

From 1953, the race was called the "Asahi Challenge Cup", but returned to just the "Challenge Cup" in 2014.

== Winners since 2000 ==
Year	Winner	Age	Jockey	Trainer	Owner	Time
2000	Mikki Dance	4	Tetsuzo Sato	Toshiyuki Hattori	Hisashi Miki	1:58.3
2001	Ibuki Government	5	Hiroshi Kawachi	Kojiro Hashiguchi	Ibuki	1:59.4
2002	Tap Dance City	5	Tetsuzo Sato	Shozo Sasaki	Yushun Horse Club	1:58.1
2003	Camphor Best	4	Katsumi Ando	Yoshikatsu Sato	Kiyoharu Okumura	1:58.3
2004	Suzuka Mambo	3	Yutaka Take	Mitsuru Hashida	Keiji Nagai	2:01.6
2005	One More Chatter	5	Yuichi Fukunaga	Yasuo Tomomichi	Ichizo Matsui	1:59.4
2006	Trillion Cut	6	Ryuji Wada	Hidetaka Otonashi	Carrot Farm	1:57.4
2007	Inti Raimi	5	Tetsuzo Sato	Shozo Sasaki	Sunday Racing	2:00.0
2008	Dream Journey	4	Kenichi Ikezoe	Yasutoshi Ikee	Sunday Racing	1:58.5
2009	Captain Thule	4	Yuga Kawada	Hideyuki Mori	Shadai Race Horse	2:00.0
2010	Captain Thule	5	Futoshi Komaki	Hideyuki Mori	Shadai Race Horse	1:59.2
2011	Mikki Dream	4	Ryuji Wada	Hidetaka Otonashi	Mizuki Noda	1:59.6
2012	Shoryu Moon	5	Shinichiro Akiyama	Shozo Sasaki	Wataru Ueda	1:46.6
2013	Archimedes	4	Mickael Barzalona	Hideaki Fujiwara	Mohammed bin Rashid Al Maktoum	1:46.5
2014	Tosen Stardom	3	Yutaka Take	Yasutoshi Ikee	Takaya Shimakawa	1:45.9
2015	Fluky	5	Mirco Demuro	Katsuhiko Sumii	Makoto Kaneko	1:46.1
2016	Meiner Honey	3	Daichi Shibata	Hironuki Korita	Thoroughbred Club Ruffian	1:46.5
2017	Satono Chronicle	3	Mirco Demuro	Yasutoshi Ikee	Satomi Horse Company	1:58.6
2018	Air Windsor	4	Mirco Demuro	Kazuya Nakatake	Lucky Field	1:58.3
2019	Lord My Way	3	Christophe Lemaire	Haruki Sugiyama	Lord Horse Club	1:59.1
2020	Lei Papale	3	Yuga Kawada	Tomokazu Takano	Carrot Farm	1:59.9
2021	So Valiant	3	Christophe Lemaire	Masahiro Otake	Shadai Race Horse	2:01.0
2022	So Valiant	4	Christophe Lemaire	Masahiro Otake	Shadai Race Horse	1:57.5
2023	Bellagio Opera	3	Kazuo Yokoyama	Hiroyuki Uemura	Shorai Hayashida	1:58.8
2024	Ravel	4	Yuga Kawada	Yoshito Yahagi	Carrot Farm Co. Ltd.	1:58.2
2025	Allnatt	4	João Moreira	Masahiro Otake	Silk Racing	1:58.0
2026	Giovanni	4	Kohei Matsuyama	Haruki Sugiyama	KR Japan	1:57.6

== Earlier winners ==
- 1950 - Takakura Yama
- 1951 - Sachihomare
- 1952 - Nobel
- 1953 - Dainikatsu Fuji
- 1954 - Miss Bambuton
- 1955 - Yasaka
- 1956 - Final Score
- 1957 - Salth
- 1958 - A. Time
- 1959 - Miss Ieryu
- 1960 - Caesar
- 1961 - Miss Hatsurai
- 1962 - Ryulight
- 1963 - Passport
- 1964 - Ballymoss Nisei
- 1965 - Golden Pass
- 1966 - Nasuno Kotobuki
- 1967 - Toughness
- 1968 - Tanino Harromore
- 1969 - Date Horai
- 1970 - Kei Santa
- 1971 - Kei Santa
- 1972 - Shingun
- 1973 - Tanino Chikara
- 1974 - Three York
- 1975 - Long Hawk
- 1976 - Keishu Ford
- 1977 - Hokuto Boy
- 1978 - Hashi Kotobuki
- 1979 - Bambton Court
- 1980 - Agnes Lady
- 1981 - Lafontaice
- 1982 - Hikari Duel
- 1983 - Miss Radical
- 1984 - Nihon Pillow Winner
- 1985 - Wakao Raiden
- 1986 - Dokan Yashima
- 1987 - President City
- 1988 - Tanino Suesei
- 1989 - Hatushiba Ace
- 1990 - Foundry Popo
- 1991 - Nuevo Tosho
- 1992 - Let It Be
- 1993 - Wish Dream
- 1994 - Tsurumaru Girl
- 1995 - My Shinzan
- 1996 - Marvelous Sunday
- 1997 - Shin Kaiun
- 1998 - Run For The Dream
- 1999 - Tsurumaru Tsuyoshi

== See also ==
- Horse racing in Japan
- List of Japanese flat horse races
