= Stayers Stakes =

Horse race in Japan

Stayers Stakes ステイヤーズステークス
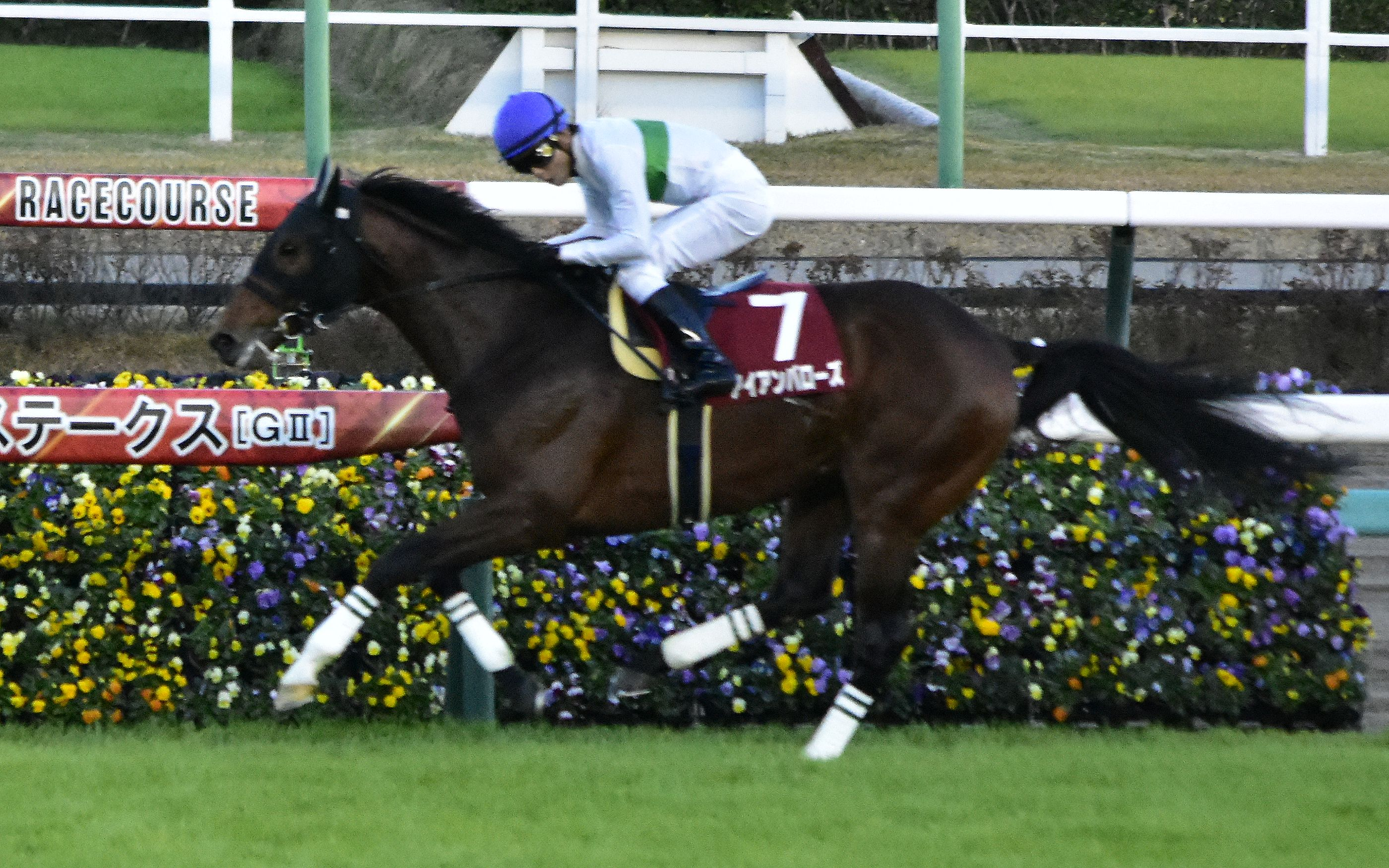
- 2023 Stayers Stakes winner Iron Barows
- Class: Grade 2
- Location: Nakayama Racecourse
- Inaugurated: 1967
- Race type: Thoroughbred Flat racing

Race information
- Distance: 3600 metres
- Surface: Turf
- Track: Right-handed
- Qualification: 3-y-o +
- Weight: Special Weight
- Purse: ¥ 134,620,000 (as of 2025): 1st: ¥ 62,000,000; 2nd: ¥ 25,000,000; 3rd: ¥ 16,000,000

The Stayers Stakes (Japanese ステイヤーズステークス) is a Grade 2 horse race in Japan for Thoroughbreds aged three and over run in December over a distance of 3,600 metres at Nakayama Racecourse.

It was first run in early Autumn of 1967 before being moved to December from 1972. The Stayers Stakes was promoted to Grade 3 in 1984, and Grade 2 in 1997.

== Weight ==
55 kg for three-year-olds, 57 kg for four-year-olds and above.

Allowances:

- 2 kg for fillies / mares
- 2 kg for southern hemisphere bred three-year-olds

Penalties (excluding two-year-old race performance):

- If a graded stakes race has been won within a year:
  - 2 kg for a grade 1 win (1 kg for fillies / mares)
  - 1 kg for a grade 2 win
- If a graded stakes race has been won for more than a year:
  - 1 kg for a grade 1 win

== Winners since 2000 ==
Year	Winner	Age	Jockey	Trainer	Owner	Time
2000	Hot Secret	4	Yoshitomi Shibata	Yoshiyuki Goto	Makoto Kaneko	3:45.6
2001	Erimo Brian	4	Norihiro Yokoyama	Izumi Shimizu	Shinichi Yamamoto	3:43.3
2002	Hot Secret	6	Yukio Okabe	Yoshiyuki Goto	Makoto Kaneko	3:45.6
2003	Chakra	3	Hiroki Goto	Akio Adachi	Eiko Tadokoro	3:48.2
2004	Daitaku Bertram	6	Mirco Demuro	Kojiro Hashiguchi	Taiyo Farm	3:44.8
2005	Delta Blues	4	Olivier Peslier	Katsuhiko Sumii	Sunday Racing	3:47.7
2006	Eye Popper	6	Olivier Peslier	Izumi Shimizu	Sunday Racing	3:43.4
2007	Makihata Cyborg	5	Yutaka Yoshida	Megumu Shinkawa	Makimoto Bokujo	3:44.9
2008	Air Zipangu	5	Norihiro Yokoyama	Hideaki Fujiwara	Lucky Field	3:48.1
2009	Forgettable	3	Christophe Soumillon	Yasutoshi Ikee	Makoto Kaneko	3:51.3
2010	Cosmo Helenos	3	Masami Matsuoka	Masatatsu Kikukawa	Big Red Farm	3:43.4
2011	Meiner Kitz	8	Kousei Miura	Sakae Kunieda	Thoroughbred Club Ruffian	3:50.8
2012	Tokai Trick	10	Hiroshi Kitamura	Kenji Nonaka	Masanori Uchimura	3:46.5
2013	Desperado	5	Norihiro Yokoyama	Akio Adachi	Yoshimi Ichikawa	3:45.2
2014	Desperado	6	Norihiro Yokoyama	Akio Adachi	Yoshimi Ichikawa	3:47.8
2015	Albert	4	Ryan Moore	Noriyuki Hori	Masamichi Hayashi	3:45.9
2016	Albert	5	Ryan Moore	Noriyuki Hori	Masamichi Hayashi	3:47.8
2017	Albert	6	Ryan Moore	Noriyuki Hori	Masamichi Hayashi	3:43.0
2018	Ridge Man	5	Masayoshi Ebina	Yasushi Shono	Tsuji Bokujo	3:45.2
2019	Mondo Intero	7	William Buick	Takahisa Tezuka	Silk Racing	3:46.1
2020	Ocea Great	4	Norihiro Yokoyama	Masatatsu Kikukawa	IHR	3:52.0
2021	Divine Force	5	Hironobu Tanabe	Ryo Terashima	Haruya Yoshida	3:47.6
2022	Silver Sonic	6	Damian Lane	Yasutoshi Ikee	Shadai Race Horse	3:46.3
2023	Iron Barows	6	Shu Ishibashi	Hiroyuki Uemura	Hirotsugu Inokuma	3:45.4
2024	Chevalier Rose	6	Yuichi Kitamura	Hisashi Shimizu	Carrot Farm Co. Ltd.	3:46.7
2025	Hohelied	4	Keita Tosaki	Toshiaki Tajima	Haruya Yoshida	3:47.2

== Earlier winners ==
- 1967 - Riko
- 1968 - New Onward
- 1969 - Attack Blue
- 1970 - Continental
- 1971 - Race Cancelled
- 1972 - Zieger
- 1973 - Toyo Asahi
- 1974 - Excel Runner
- 1975 - Tosho Rock
- 1976 - Hokkai Noble
- 1977 - Lancelot
- 1978 - Fujino High Hat
- 1979 - Sakura Eiryu
- 1980 - Fujino High Hat
- 1981 - Pure Symboli
- 1982 - Pure Symboli
- 1983 - Bright Symboli
- 1984 - Kane Kuroshio
- 1985 - Hokkai Pegasus
- 1986 - See Nan Lady
- 1987 - Mount Nizon
- 1988 - Slew O Dyna
- 1989 - Slew O Dyna
- 1990 - Doctor Spurt
- 1991 - Meisho Vitoria
- 1992 - Ayrton Symboli
- 1993 - Ayrton Symboli
- 1994 - Air Dublin
- 1995 - Stage Champ
- 1996 - Sage Wells
- 1997 - Mejiro Bright
- 1998 - Inter Flag
- 1999 - Painted Black

== See also ==
- Horse racing in Japan
- List of Japanese flat horse races
