= Twin Turbo (horse) =

Japanese thoroughbred racehorse

Twin Turbo ツインターボ
- Twin Turbo mid-race at the 1991 Radio Tampa Sho.
- Breed: Thoroughbred
- Sire: Lyra Ridge
- Grandsire: Lyphard
- Dam: Racing Jean
- Damsire: Sancy
- Sex: Stallion
- Foaled: May 13, 1988
- Died: January 15, 1998 (aged 9)
- Country: Japan
- Color: Bay
- Breeder: Toshihiro Fukuoka
- Owner: Haruo Kuroiwa
- Racing colors
- Trainer: Takehisa Sasakura
- Record: 35: 6-2-0
- Earnings: 186,707,600 yen

Major wins
- Radio Tampa Sho (G3, 1991); Tanabata Sho (G3, 1993); Sankei Sho All Comers (G3, 1993)
- Last updated on 2026 October 11

Twin Turbo (Japanese: ツインターボ; Hepburn: Tsuin Taabo; April 13, 1988 – January 15, 1998) was a Japanese Thoroughbred racehorse and stud. His main victories were at the 1993 Tanabata Sho and Sankei Sho All Comers. Despite few high placements in races, he was widely popular with fans throughout his career for his extreme front-running style, which led to him burning out and losing miserably more often than not. He has become just as well-known as Silence Suzuka among Japanese front-runners.

== Background ==
Twin Turbo was foaled in 1988 in Shizunai, Hokkaido. He had a powerful spring in his legs from a young age, but he didn't eat much and was extremely small. He was reared and trained at Nikko Kentucky Farm at one year old, and in the spring of the following year he entered Takehisa Sasakura's stable at Miho Training Center in Ibaraki prefecture.

He was a docile horse while in the stable, but he would thoroughly rebel against anyone who mounted him, making him difficult to train. It took four months for him to pass the required gate test, meaning that his racing debut wouldn't be until next year in 1991.

== Racing career ==
=== 1991: three-year-old season ===
Twin Turbo made his debut in a maiden race at Nakayama Racecourse on March 2, 1991. Sasakura's only instructions for his jockey, Nobuhiro Ishizuka, were "Let him run how he likes. Put him in front. Then just hold onto the reins." Ishizuka did as instructed, having the horse run to the front out of the starting gate, and won the race by three lengths. He went on to win a second race, a condition race called the Mokuren Sho.

After the horse's two consecutive victories, he was on the verge of earning the right to run in the Tokyo Yushun (Japanese Derby). The team switched his jockey to Shoichi Osaki and entered him into the Aoba Sho (then an open stakes race) that served as a Derby trial race. Halfway down the final straight, Twin Turbo lost speed and was defeated for the first time, placing 9th to Leo Durban. He then entered another condition race, the Komakusa Sho, where he placed 5th jockeyed by Masato Shibata.

In his next graded race, the G3 Radio Tampa Sho, Osaki took the reins again, pushing Twin Turbo far out in to the lead on the back stretch and giving the horse his first graded win. This was also Sasakura's first graded thoroughbred victory.

After a midsummer recuperation, Twin Turbo's autumn season started by contesting the St Lite Kinen. With Osaki jockeying once again, he held fast in second place a neck from Strong Kaiser. Near the end, Leo Durban—who had beaten him in a showdown at the Aoba Sho and who would win his next race, the Kikuka Sho—surged up the field, but Twin Turbo held him to a neck's length to finish 2nd.

Twin Turbo didn't contest the final race of the thoroughbred classic year, the Kikuka Sho, instead opting for the Fukushima Kinen, a G3 race held at Fukushima Racecourse just like the Radio Tampa Sho. There, he came in 2nd for a second consecutive time, this time to Yagura Stella.

He then contested the Arima Kinen, a grand prix race and his first G1, but only managed to place 14th. After the race, it was discovered that he had a nosebleed.

=== 1992: four-year-old season ===
At the beginning of the year, Twin Turbo's physical condition worsened, forcing him into a long hiatus until November to recover. His comeback race was the Fukushima Minyu Cup (an open stakes race), his only race of the year, where he was the number-one favorite. However, he finished in 10th.

=== 1993: five-year-old season ===
Twin Turbo's poor results continued into 1993, with a 6th place finish at the Kimpai (East), 6th at the Nakayama Kinen, and 8th at the Niigata Daishoten.

In July, he contested the Tanabata Sho, a Grade 3 race at Fukushima Racecourse, where he'd previously done well. Twin Turbo had always been slow out of the gates, and to fix that, Eiji Nakadate came in. The jockey was a specialist when it came to front-running and skillful at coming out of the gates. Nakadate is reported as saying that he'd always wanted to ride Twin Turbo at least once.

The day of the race saw a record 47,391 attendees at Fukushima Racecourse, and Twin Turbo was third-favorite to win. He pulled out far into the lead at a high pace of 57.4 seconds in the first 1000 meters, and he maintained that speed all the way to the finish line, beating Ayrton Symboli by four lengths and achieving his first victory in about two years. Nakadate commented that "I just held the reins. The horse won a brilliant victory by himself."

After a break, Twin Turbo came back two months later to compete in the G3 All Comers, once again with Eiji Nakadate at the reins. The field included strong racers like Rice Shower, who had won 2 G1 races including that year's spring Tenno Sho. Twin Turbo was the third favorite behind Rice Shower and Sister Tosho, winner of the 1991 Oka Sho.

As always, Twin Turbo pulled far out ahead at the start, getting about 10 lengths from second-place White Stone; the front pack was also ten lengths in front of the rear pack. Twin Turbo ran alone, never slowing down on the final straightaway and reaching the finish line five lengths ahead of Hashiru Shogun, earning his second graded victory. Masato Shibata, who jockeyed White Stone (4th) during the race, said "If I'd chased any deeper, White Stone would have collapsed." He would indeed go on to see disastrous results in a later race by pushing too hard. Still, Twin Turbo's pace in the front 1000 meters was relatively fast at 59.5 seconds. While watching the patrol film after the race, Nakadate commented that "I was in disbelief. How were we that far ahead?"

Twin Turbo's next attempt at a G1 race was the autumn Tenno Sho, where he was first favorite the day before and third favorite the day of. His rival horses were cautious of his extreme front-running style, though, and he was unable to pull into a lead. He finished last in the race at 17th, finishing 2.8 seconds behind the winner Yamanin Zephyr.

=== 1994–1996: later seasons and retirement ===
The next two years for Twin Turbo saw a string of nine races where he would create a huge lead at first, then lose speed on the final straightaway, ultimately becoming unable to win another JRA race after his All Comers victory. Nakadate commented "I feel like he might have burned himself out at the All Comers," but even during this slump, the horse continued to receive fan support for what they saw as honorable defeats.

Later in 1995, he transferred to a new public stable at Kaminoyama Racecourse. While he won his first race there, he then had an 11-race losing streak. At eight years old in 1996, he entered his last run at the Cluster Cup before retiring. While he became a stud horse at Saito Bokujo in Miyagi Prefecture in 1997, he only foaled five children in a single generation before dying of heart failure on January 15, 1998.

In 2014, the JRA held a sixtieth-anniversary memorial race at the year's Tanabata Sho on July 13, featuring the "Idaten Twin Turbo Cup" as a semi-main race that day. The race's name was determined based on a fan vote, but Twin Turbo had over twice the number of votes as the second-place horse, Miyabi Ranveli.

== Running style and popularity ==
The term "oo-nige" (huge lead) came to be synonymous with Twin Turbo. His manner of either winning by an overwhelming margin or losing speed and losing miserably made him a unique type of front-runner. When the Japan Racing Association's PR magazine, Yushun, ran a "ten most unique racehorses" poll in 2014, the voting for front-runners in the 1980s to 2000s ended with Twin Turbo at second place behind Silence Suzuka both in terms of fan vote and expert vote. Silence Suzuka had gained fame as one of the strongest front-runners of all time, and the judge Shohei Shimosaka said that there had been a fierce debate before the expert panel cast their votes about whether to choose Silence Suzuka or Twin Turbo.

As part of his commentary on Twin Turbo for this project, writer Takuya Sanga wrote that even if Turbo burned out ninety-nine times in a row, everyone still hoped he would escape to the finish on the hundredth try. "The audience would all be relaxed, wondering when he'd stop. And the moment he lost speed and began to fall behind, both those who had bet on him and those who hadn't would all burst out laughing. He burned out without it feeling tragic or grim. Have there been any other horses like him? No. Only Twin Turbo has managed that." Horse-racing manga-ka Miho Yoshida talked about him in his own work, saying "When his front-running style worked, it felt amazing, and when others caught up to him it was good too." "He didn't win the big races, but horseracing wouldn't be fun without horses like him. He was a widely-loved horse." In 2000, when the JRA selected its most famous racehorses, Twin Turbo's popularity garnered 848 fan votes, and he was chosen as 91st favorite. The only other horses selected for this who hadn't won a single Grade 1 race (or any of the big eight races before the introduction of the grading system) were Stay Gold (34th, though he won a G1 after this project) and Nice Nature (71st).

During the commentary panel for Dream Horses 2000, author Makoto Yoshikawa commented about Twin Turbo's selection that "Horseracing nowadays has grown boring, and I think responsibility for that lies with jockeys for everyone riding their horses the same way," criticizing it as a widespread problem among jockeys. In addition, the only race in Twin Turbo's career in which he didn't adopt a front-running strategy was at the Teio Sho, when he got out of the gates late and started in last place. Yutaka Take, his jockey for the race, made comments to the effect of not having planned to run to begin with. In response, writer Sakae Kato criticized the jockey for betraying the expectations of the hosts and fans, saying "Take ran an incredibly dull race." He also lambasted the man: "Twin Turbo is no longer a lifelong front-runner. He put a blemish on the horse's history."

On the other hand, Take claimed that after the late start, he had desperately grappled with the horse's reins, but he ran poorly and could barely even keep up with the pack. While looking back on this Teio Sho during a variety TV show, he said that "(Late out the gate and covered in dirt) he was in no shape to race. Naturally that meant we were bringing up the rear."

== In popular culture ==
An anthropomorphized version of Twin Turbo appears as a character in the Japanese multimedia franchise Umamusume: Pretty Derby, voiced by Miharu Hanai. She is depicted as a bombastic, rambunctious, and foolhardy girl with a tendency to sprint and act recklessly without a second thought, oftentimes tiring herself out. However, she endears herself to others with her determination and can-do attitude, such as when she inspires Tokai Teio in the final episode of the second season of the anime series, in which she can been seen on a recording winning a race representing her real-life counterpart's victory at the 1993 Sankei Sho All Comers. Similar to Haru Urara, her blue hair is not based on the horse's fur, but rather on the color of her real-life counterpart's racing mask.

In a chapter of Miho Yoshida's manga Umanari 1-haron Gekijo (馬なり1ハロン劇場; Horse Racing One Furlong Theater), there is a scene at the Arima Kinen where Mejiro Palmer, another unique front-runner from Twin Turbo's generation, takes the lead and Twin Turbo picks a fight with him.

== Racing Records ==
The following form is based on information from JBIS-Search and netkeiba. (Note: Prior to Japan's revision of the way it counts horse ages to match the international standard in 2001, newborns used to be considered 1 year old, thus there is a one-year difference in the names of certain races.)

Date	Age	Racecourse	Name	Grade	Field	Finished	Jockey	Distance/Type	Time	Winner (2nd place)
March 2, 1991	3	Nakayama	Maiden race		12	1st	Nobuhiro Ishizuka	Dirt 1800m	1:57.2	(Kochi Port)
March 24, 1991	3	Nakayama	Mokuren Sho	500k-under	11	1st	Nobuhiro Ishizuka	Turf 2000m	2:03.4	(Sanei Luck)
April 27, 1991	3	Tokyo	Aoba Sho	Open	17	9th	Shoichi Osaki	Turf 2400m	2:28.9	Leo Durban
May 26, 1991	3	Tokyo	Komakusa Sho	900k-under	18	5th	Masato Shibata	Turf 2000m	2:02.0	Strong Kaiser
June 30, 1991	3	Fukushima	Radio Tampa Sho	G3	11	1st	Shoichi Osaki	Turf 1800m	1:48.5	(Kamino Sword)
September 22, 1991	3	Nakayama	St Lite Kinen	G2	13	2nd	Shoichi Osaki	Turf 2200m	2:12.8	Strong Kaiser
November 17, 1991	3	Fukushima	Fukushima Kinen	G3	14	2nd	Shoichi Osaki	Turf 2000m	2:01.4	Yagura Stella
December 22, 1991	3	Nakayama	Arima Kinen	G1	15	14th	Shoichi Osaki	Turf 2500m	2:34.4	Dai Yusaku
November 8, 1992	4	Fukushima	Fukushima Minyu Cup	Open	10	10th	Yoshitomi Shibata	Turf 1800m	1:52.0	Rabbit Ball
January 5, 1993	5	Nakayama	Kimpai (East)	G3	13	6th	Yoshitomi Shibata	Turf 2000m	2:00.9	Sekitei Ryu O
March 14, 1993	5	Nakayama	Nakayama Kinen	G2	14	6th	Yoshitomi Shibata	Turf 1800m	1:47.5	Movie Star
May 16, 1993	5	Niigata	Niigata Daishoten	G3	14	8th	Shoichi Osaki	Turf 2200m	2:14.4	Hashino Kenshiro
July 11, 1993	5	Fukushima	Tanabata Sho	G3	16	1st	Eiji Nakadate	Turf 2000m	1:59.5	(Ayrton Symboli)
September 19, 1993	5	Nakayama	Sankei Sho All Comers	G3	13	1st	Eiji Nakadate	Turf 2200m	2:12.6	(Hashiru Shogun)
October 31, 1993	5	Tokyo	Tenno Sho (Autumn)	G1	17	17th	Eiji Nakadate	Turf 2000m	2:01.7	Yamanin Zephyr
January 23, 1994	6	Nakayama	American Jockey Club Cup	G2	14	6th	Eiji Nakadate	Turf 2200m	2:14.7	Matikanetannhauser
March 20, 1994	6	Nakayama	Nikkei Sho	G2	9	6th	Eiji Nakadate	Turf 2500m	2:34.4	Stage Champ
August 21, 1994	6	Sapporo	Hakodate Kinen	G3	14	11th	Hiromasa Tamogi	Turf 2000m	2:03.8	Wako Chikako
November 20, 1994	6	Fukushima	Fukushima Kinen	G3	14	8th	Tohru Munakata	Turf 2000m	2:02.7	Silk Grayish
December 25, 1994	6	Nakayama	Arima Kinen	G1	13	13th	Katsuharu Tanaka	Turf 2500m	2:37.2	Narita Brian
January 22, 1995	7	Nakayama	American Jockey Club Cup	G2	10	10th	Eiji Nakadate	Turf 2200m	2:17.4	Sakura Chitose O
April 13, 1995	7	Ohi	Teio Sho	Graded	15	15th	Yutaka Take	Dirt 2000m	2:10.9	Lively Mount
May 14, 1995	7	Fukushima	Niigata Daishoten	G3	14	11th	Tohru Munakata	Turf 2000m	2:06.2	Irish Dance
July 23, 1995	7	Kaminoyama	Fumizuki Tokubetsu	A2	7	1st	Eiji Kaikata	Dirt 1700m	1:52.5	(Azuree Symboli)
August 20, 1995	7	Kaminoyama	Three-year-old & Up	A2	9	9th	Eiji Kaikata	Dirt 1700m	1:55.1	Tiger Berg
September 3, 1995	7	Kaminoyama	Three-year-old & Up	A2	8	7th	Eiji Kaikata	Dirt 1700m	1:54.5	Air in Heart
September 19, 1995	7	Kaminoyama	Nagatsuki Tokubetsu	A1	10	10th	Tashiro Yoshihisa	Dirt 1800m	2:00.0	Takeden Mangetsu
October 15, 1995	7	Kaminoyama	Kannazuki Tokubetsu	A2	9	9th	Tashiro Yoshihisa	Dirt 1700m	1:55.2	Hokusai Roller
October 31, 1995	7	Kaminoyama	Three-year-old & Up	A1	10	9th	Tashiro Yoshihisa	Dirt 1800m	2:02.3	Air in Heart
November 26, 1995	7	Kaminoyama	Three-year-old & Up	A2	6	Scratched	Sho Yamanaka	Dirt 1700m	–	Lilliput Queen
April 16, 1996	8	Kaminoyama	Three-year-old & Up	A1	10	9th	Eiji Kaikata	Dirt 1800m	2:05.2	Hokusai Roller
April 29, 1996	8	Kaminoyama	Three-year-old & Up	A1	9	9th	Eiji Kaikata	Dirt 1800m	2:04.7	Noiseless Winner
June 10, 1996	8	Kaminoyama	Minazuki Tokubetsu	A2	9	9th	Tatsuki Endo	Dirt 1700m	1:55.6	Kagarisky
July 9, 1996	8	Kaminoyama	Fumizuki Tokubetsu	A1	9	7th	Tatsuki Endo	Dirt 1800m	1:59.9	Tannhauser
July 22, 1996	8	Kaminoyama	Three-year-old & Up	A2	7	7th	Tatsuki Endo	Dirt 1700m	1:54.8	Namura Create
August 13, 1996	8	Morioka	Cluster Cup	G3	12	11th	Eiji Kaikata	Dirt 1200m	1:13.3	Tokio Crafty

== Pedigree ==
Pedigree of Twin Turbo
Sire Lyra Ridge	Lyphard	Northern Dancer	Nearctic
Sire Lyra Ridge	Lyphard	Northern Dancer	Natalma
Sire Lyra Ridge	Lyphard	Goofed	Court Martial
Sire Lyra Ridge	Lyphard	Goofed	Barra
Sire Lyra Ridge	Riverside	Sheshoon	Precipitation
Sire Lyra Ridge	Riverside	Sheshoon	Noorani
Sire Lyra Ridge	Riverside	Renounce	Big Game
Sire Lyra Ridge	Riverside	Renounce	Refreshed
Dam Racing Jean	Sancy	Sanctus	Fine Top
Dam Racing Jean	Sancy	Sanctus	Sanelta
Dam Racing Jean	Sancy	Wordys	Worden
Dam Racing Jean	Sancy	Wordys	Princesse d'Ys
Dam Racing Jean	Mauta Jo O	Faberge	Princely Gift
Dam Racing Jean	Mauta Jo O	Faberge	Spring Offensive
Dam Racing Jean	Mauta Jo O	Hard Hope	Die Hard
Dam Racing Jean	Mauta Jo O	Hard Hope	Mejiro Hohpu
