= Hishi Iguazu =

Japanese Thoroughbred racehorse (foaled 2016)

Hishi Iguazu; ヒシイグアス
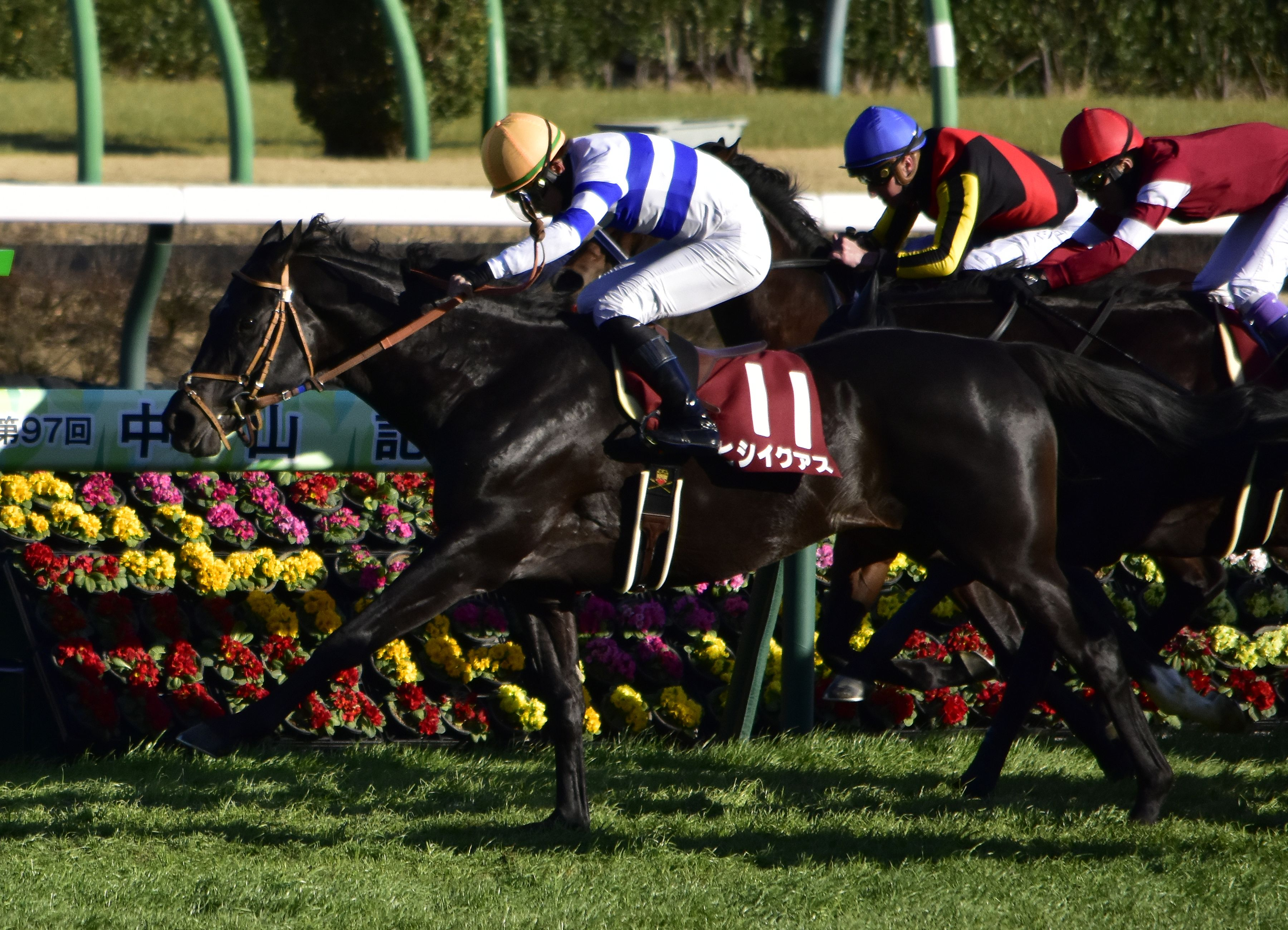
- Hishi Iguazu at the 2023 Nakayama Kinen
- Breed: Thoroughbred
- Sire: Heart's Cry
- Grandsire: Sunday Silence
- Dam: Larys
- Damsire: Bernstein
- Sex: Stallion
- Foaled: 22 January 2016 (age 10)
- Country: Japan
- Colour: Dark bay
- Breeder: Northern Farm
- Owner: Masahide Abe
- Racing colours
- Trainer: Noriyuki Hori
- Jockey: Ryan Moore; Christophe Lemaire; Filip Minařík; Mirco Demuro; Damian Lane; Kohei Matsuyama; Kenichi Ikezoe; João Moreira; Suguru Hamanaka; Rachel King
- Record: 22: 7-5-1
- Earnings: ¥553,843,900

Major wins
- Nakayama Kinen (2021, 2023); Nakayama Kimpai (2021)

Hishi Iguazu (Japanese: ヒシイグアス, Hishi Iguasu; foaled 22 January 2016) is a retired Japanese Thoroughbred racehorse. He recorded seven wins from twenty-two starts between 2018 and 2024, including the Nakayama Kinen (GII) in 2021 and 2023 and the Nakayama Kimpai (GIII) in 2021. He also finished second in the 2021 Hong Kong Cup (G1) and the 2022 Takarazuka Kinen (GI), and third in the 2023 Hong Kong Cup. He was rated 117 in 2021, 120 in 2022, and 119 in 2023 on the World's Best Racehorse Rankings. His name combines the owner's prefix "Hishi" with Iguazu Falls, the largest waterfall in Argentina. In Hong Kong he raced under the name 滂薄無比.

== Background ==
Hishi Iguazu is a dark bay stallion bred in Abira, Hokkaido, by Northern Farm. He was sired by Heart's Cry, a son of Sunday Silence, and his dam was Larys (ARG), a mare by Bernstein who was a sprinter in Argentina, winning two Group 3 races and finishing second in a Group 1 sprint race. He was owned by Masahide Abe and trained by Noriyuki Hori at the JRA's Miho Training Center.

== Racing career ==
=== 2018: two-year-old season ===
Hishi Iguazu debuted on 25 November 2018 in a 2-year-old newcomer race over 1800 metres on turf at Tokyo Racecourse. Ridden by Ryan Moore, he contested the finish with Last Draft and finished second. On 15 December, he won his maiden race over 2000 metres at Nakayama Racecourse with Christophe Lemaire.

=== 2019: three-year-old season ===
He began the season on 19 January by winning the Wakatake Sho at Nakayama with Filip Minarik. On 17 March, he made his graded stakes debut in the Spring Stakes (GII) at Nakayama, finishing fifth behind Emeral Fight as the 3rd favourite. On 30 June, he started 1st favourite in the Radio Nikkei Sho (GIII) at Fukushima Racecourse but finished ninth on heavy ground.

=== 2020: four-year-old season ===
After a six-month break, he finished second in two consecutive 2-win class races, on 18 January behind Daiwa Douglas and on 29 February behind Hermetikist, both with Minarik. On 26 April, ridden by Damian Lane, he won the Isawa Special at Tokyo, defeating Upright Spin by 3/4 length. Following a further seven-month break, he won the Welcome Stakes (3-win class) at Tokyo on 29 November with Kohei Matsuyama, defeating Shonan Hallelujah by 3/4 length.

=== 2021: five-year-old season ===
On 5 January, Hishi Iguazu won the Nakayama Kimpai (GIII) as the 1st favourite, defeating Kokoro no Todai by a neck. On 28 February, he started 1st favourite at 2.5 odds in the Nakayama Kinen (GII) at Nakayama. He took the lead in the final 50 metres and defeated Cadence Call by a neck, extending his winning streak to four races and giving Matsuyama his third win from three rides on the horse. On 31 October, he contested the Tennō Shō (Autumn) (GI) at Tokyo, his first Grade 1 start. Drawn wide in stall 15, he finished fifth behind Efforia. On 12 December, he ran in the Hong Kong Cup (G1) at Sha Tin Racecourse. Ridden by João Moreira, he briefly took the lead in the straight but was repassed on the inside by Loves Only You, finishing second by a short head.

=== 2022: six-year-old season ===
He was originally scheduled to run in the Queen Elizabeth II Cup in Hong Kong in April, but the plan was cancelled after the host authority suspended the acceptance of overseas horses due to the COVID-19 pandemic. Instead, he ran in the Osaka Hai (GI) on 3 April at Hanshin, finishing fourth behind Potager with Kenichi Ikezoe. On 26 June, he ran in the Takarazuka Kinen (GI) at Hanshin. Ridden by Damian Lane, he recorded the fastest final three furlongs of the race but finished second, two lengths behind Titleholder. After the race, he suffered severe heat stroke upon his return to the Miho Training Center and was in a life-threatening condition. He recovered after hospitalisation and time in an air-conditioned stall, and was sent to recuperate in Hokkaido before moving to Northern Farm Shigaraki.

=== 2023: seven-year-old season ===
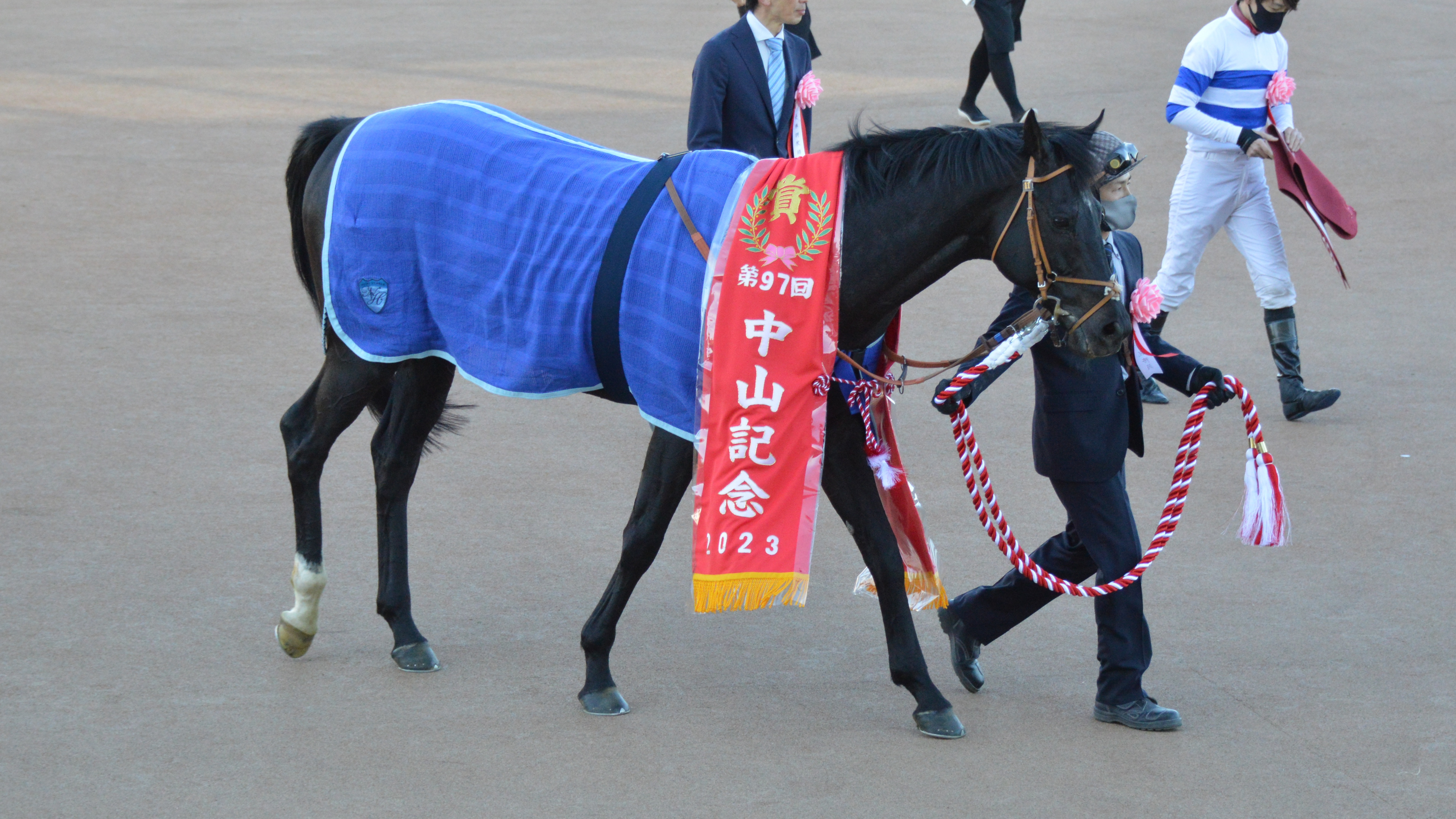
Hishi Iguazu after the 2023 Nakayama Kinen

Hishi Iguazu returned to Miho on 28 January and contested the Nakayama Kinen (GII) on 26 February after an eight-month layoff. He was held in mid-field on the inside, advanced on the final turn, and switched to the outside in the straight to win by 0.1 seconds, recording his third graded stakes victory. He then finished seventh in the Osaka Hai on 2 April, fifth in the Sapporo Kinen (GII) on 20 August, and ninth in the Tennō Shō (Autumn) on 29 October. On 10 December, he ran in the Hong Kong Cup at Sha Tin, finishing third behind Romantic Warrior.

=== 2024: eight-year-old season ===
He began the season on 25 February in the Nakayama Kinen, ridden by Rachel King, and finished 11th. He accepted an invitation to the Queen Elizabeth II Cup (G1) at Sha Tin on 28 April, his third overseas start, and finished fifth behind Romantic Warrior. His JRA registration was cancelled on 16 November 2024, and he became a lead horse at Nakayama Racecourse.

== Characteristics ==
Hishi Iguazu recorded five wins and two second-place finishes from nine starts at Nakayama Racecourse, and all three of his graded stakes victories came at the course. He was referred to by the media as a Nakayama specialist and as the "Nakayama Shogun".

== Race record ==
The following table details all 22 starts of Hishi Iguazu's racing career based on official JBIS, netkeiba, and Hong Kong Jockey Club records. Record current as of his final start on 28 April 2024.

| Date | Distance (Condition) | Race | Class | Course | Odds (Favourite) | Field | Finish | Time | Jockey | Winning (Losing) Margin | Winner (2nd Place) | Ref |
|---|---|---|---|---|---|---|---|---|---|---|---|---|
2018 – two-year-old season
| Nov 25 | Turf 1800 m (Good) | 2-Y-O Newcomer | Maiden | Tokyo | 5.2 (3rd) | 11 | 2nd | 1:49.6 | Ryan Moore | 0.0 | Last Draft | |
| Dec 15 | Turf 2000 m (Good) | 2-Y-O Maiden | Maiden | Nakayama | 1.5 (1st) | 18 | 1st | 2:01.5 | Christophe Lemaire | –0.5 | (Ho O Victory) | |
2019 – three-year-old season
| Jan 19 | Turf 1800 m (Good) | Wakatake Sho | 1-win | Nakayama | 1.9 (1st) | 8 | 1st | 1:50.4 | Filip Minařík | –0.0 | (Folktale) | |
| Mar 17 | Turf 1800 m (Good) | Spring Stakes | GII | Nakayama | 6.0 (3rd) | 16 | 5th | 1:48.0 | Filip Minarik | 0.2 | Emeral Fight | |
| Jun 30 | Turf 1800 m (Heavy) | Radio Nikkei Sho | GIII | Fukushima | 5.6 (1st) | 16 | 9th | 1:51.0 | Mirco Demuro | 1.2 | Breaking Dawn | |
2020 – four-year-old season
| Jan 18 | Turf 1800 m (Yielding) | 2-win class | 2-win | Nakayama | 3.2 (1st) | 10 | 2nd | 1:51.6 | Filip Minarik | 0.0 | Daiwa Douglas | |
| Feb 29 | Turf 1800 m (Good) | Tomisato Special | 2-win | Nakayama | 2.0 (1st) | 12 | 2nd | 1:48.4 | Filip Minarik | 0.3 | Hermeticist | |
| Apr 26 | Turf 1800 m (Good) | Isawa Special | 2-win | Tokyo | 1.9 (1st) | 10 | 1st | 1:48.0 | Damian Lane | –0.1 | (Upright Spin) | |
| Nov 29 | Turf 2000 m (Good) | Welcome Stakes | 3-win | Tokyo | 8.9 (5th) | 16 | 1st | 2:00.7 | Hiroyuki Matsuyama | –0.2 | (Shonan Hallelujah) | |
2021 – five-year-old season
| Jan 5 | Turf 2000 m (Good) | Nakayama Kimpai | GIII | Nakayama | 3.1 (1st) | 17 | 1st | 2:00.9 | Kohei Matsuyama | –0.0 | (Kokorono Todai) | |
| Feb 28 | Turf 1800 m (Good) | Nakayama Kinen | GII | Nakayama | 2.5 (1st) | 14 | 1st | 1:44.9 | Kohei Matsuyama | –0.0 | (Cadence Call) | |
| Oct 31 | Turf 2000 m (Good) | Tennō Shō (Autumn) | GI | Tokyo | 40.4 (7th) | 16 | 5th | 1:58.7 | Kohei Matsuyama | 0.8 | Efforia | |
| Dec 12 | Turf 2000 m (Good) | Hong Kong Cup | G1 | Sha Tin | 5.8 (3rd) | 12 | 2nd | 2:00.68 | João Moreira | 0.02 | Loves Only You | |
2022 – six-year-old season
| Apr 3 | Turf 2000 m (Good) | Osaka Hai | GI | Hanshin | 27.4 (5th) | 16 | 4th | 1:58.7 | Kenichi Ikezoe | 0.3 | Potager | |
| Jun 26 | Turf 2200 m (Good) | Takarazuka Kinen | GI | Hanshin | 9.5 (5th) | 17 | 2nd | 2:10.0 | Damian Lane | 0.3 | Titleholder | |
2023 – seven-year-old season
| Feb 26 | Turf 1800 m (Good) | Nakayama Kinen | GII | Nakayama | 9.2 (4th) | 14 | 1st | 1:47.1 | Kohei Matsuyama | –0.1 | (Lagulf) | |
| Apr 2 | Turf 2000 m (Good) | Osaka Hai | GI | Hanshin | 8.1 (4th) | 16 | 7th | 1:58.0 | Kohei Matsuyama | 0.6 | Jack d'Or | |
| Aug 20 | Turf 2000 m (Yielding) | Sapporo Kinen | GII | Sapporo | 16.9 (7th) | 15 | 5th | 2:02.8 | Suguru Hamanaka | 1.3 | Prognosis | |
| Oct 29 | Turf 2000 m (Good) | Tennō Shō (Autumn) | GI | Tokyo | 141.9 (8th) | 11 | 9th | 1:57.6 | Kohei Matsuyama | 2.4 | Equinox | |
| Dec 10 | Turf 2000 m (Good) | Hong Kong Cup | G1 | Sha Tin | 14.0 (6th) | 11 | 3rd | 2:02.05 | João Moreira | 0.05 | Romantic Warrior | |
2024 – eight-year-old season
| Feb 25 | Turf 1800 m (Yielding) | Nakayama Kinen | GII | Nakayama | 7.2 (3rd) | 16 | 11th | 1:49.4 | Rachel King | 1.3 | Matenro Sky | |
| Apr 28 | Turf 2000 m (Yielding) | Queen Elizabeth II Cup | G1 | Sha Tin | 18.7 (5th) | 11 | 5th | 2:01.6 | Damian Lane | 0.6 | Romantic Warrior | |

== Pedigree ==
Pedigree of Hishi Iguazu (JPN)
| Sire Heart's Cry (JPN) 2001 | Sunday Silence (USA); 1986 | Halo | Hail to Reason |
| Sire Heart's Cry (JPN) 2001 | Sunday Silence (USA); 1986 | Halo | Cosmah |
| Sire Heart's Cry (JPN) 2001 | Sunday Silence (USA); 1986 | Wishing Well | Understanding |
| Sire Heart's Cry (JPN) 2001 | Sunday Silence (USA); 1986 | Wishing Well | Mountain Flower |
| Sire Heart's Cry (JPN) 2001 | Irish Dance (JPN); 1990 | Tony Bin | Kampala |
| Sire Heart's Cry (JPN) 2001 | Irish Dance (JPN); 1990 | Tony Bin | Severn Bridge |
| Sire Heart's Cry (JPN) 2001 | Irish Dance (JPN); 1990 | Bupers Dance | Lyphard |
| Sire Heart's Cry (JPN) 2001 | Irish Dance (JPN); 1990 | Bupers Dance | My Bupers |
| Dam Larys (ARG) 2004 | Bernstein (USA); 1997 | Storm Cat | Storm Bird |
| Dam Larys (ARG) 2004 | Bernstein (USA); 1997 | Storm Cat | Terlingua |
| Dam Larys (ARG) 2004 | Bernstein (USA); 1997 | La Affirmed | Affirmed |
| Dam Larys (ARG) 2004 | Bernstein (USA); 1997 | La Affirmed | La Mesa |
| Dam Larys (ARG) 2004 | La Marlene (ARG); 1995 | Rainbow Corner | Rainbow Quest |
| Dam Larys (ARG) 2004 | La Marlene (ARG); 1995 | Rainbow Corner | Kingscote |
| Dam Larys (ARG) 2004 | La Marlene (ARG); 1995 | La Cardinale | Southern Halo |
| Dam Larys (ARG) 2004 | La Marlene (ARG); 1995 | La Cardinale | La Bozan |

- Hishi Iguazu is inbred 3 × 5 to Halo and 5 × 5 to Northern Dancer.
- His dam Larys was a sprinter in Argentina who won two Group 3 races and finished second in a Group 1 sprint race.

== See also ==
- Thoroughbred racing in Japan
