= Tanabata Sho =

Tanabata Sho 七夕賞
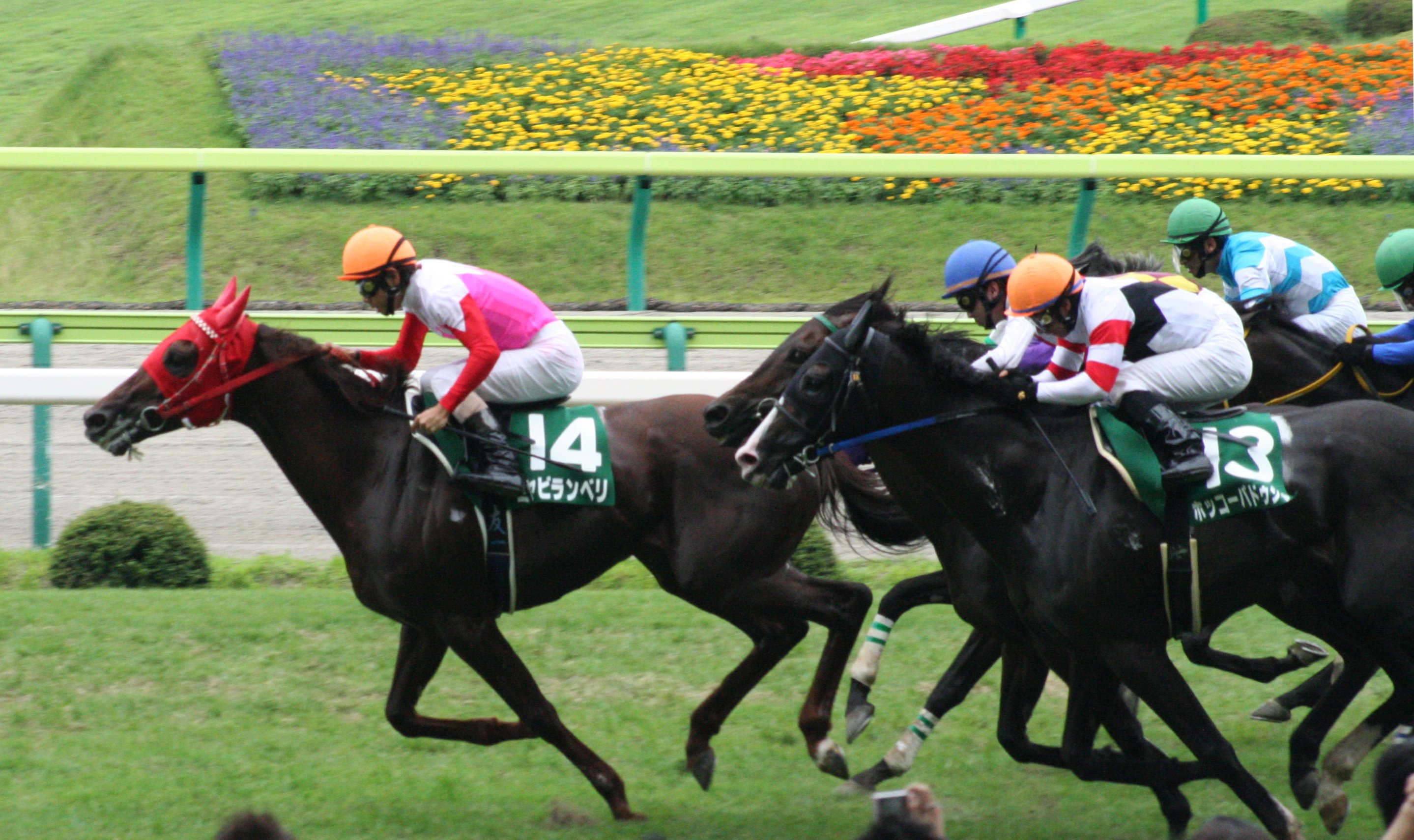
- Miyabi Ranveli wins the 2013 Tanabata Sho
- Class: Grade 3
- Location: Fukushima Racecourse
- Inaugurated: 1965
- Race type: Thoroughbred Flat racing

Race information
- Distance: 2000 metres
- Surface: Turf
- Track: Right-handed
- Qualification: 3-y-o+
- Weight: Handicap
- Purse: ¥ 92,980,000 (as of 2024): 1st: ¥ 43,000,000; 2nd: ¥ 17,000,000; 3rd: ¥ 11,000,000

The Tanabata Sho (Japanese 七夕賞) is a Japanese Grade 3 horse race for Thoroughbreds aged three and over. It is run in July each year over a distance of 2000 metres on turf at Fukushima Racecourse.

It was first run in 1965 and has held Grade 3 status since 1984. The race was initially run over 1800 metres before being moved up to its current distance in 1980. It was run at Niigata Racecourse in 1974 and 1989, Tokyo Racecourse in 2000 and Nakayama Racecourse in 2011.

== Winners since 2000 ==
Year	Winner	Age	Jockey	Trainer	Owner	Time
2000	Long Kaiun	7	Takanori Kikuzawa	Hiroyuki Nagahama	Toshio Nakai	2:01.1
2001	Gaily Tomahawk	5	Hiroshi Gohara	Akiyama Masakazu	Tokyo Thoroughbred Bureau	2:01.2
2002	Eagle Cafe	5	Katsuharu Tanaka	Futoshi Kojima	Kiyoshi Nishikawa	1:59.2
2003	Mideon Bit	6	Katsuharu Tanaka	Michifumi Kono	Mideon Kogyo	2:00.7
2004	Cheers Brightly	6	Yoshitomi Shibata	Kenji Yamauchi	Kiyoko Kitamura	2:01.7
2005	Daiwa Raiders	6	Hiroki Goto	Yasuhisa Matsuyama	Keizo Oshiro	2:00.4
2006	Meisho Kaido	7	Yutaka Take	Masahiro Sakaguchi	Yoshio Matsumoto	1:59.3
2007	San Valentin	6	Hiroki Goto	Shozo Sasaki	Katsumi Yoshida	2:00.3
2008	Miyabi Ranveli	5	Yutaka Yoshida	Keiji Kato	Yoshikatsu Murakami	1:59.8
2009	Miyabi Ranveli	6	Yuichi Kitamura	Keiji Kato	Yoshikatsu Murakami	2:00.2
2010	Domonarazu	5	Yohitomi Shibata	Hidetaka Otonashi	Yuichi Odagiri	2:00.4
2011	Italian Red	5	Eiji Nakadate	Sei Ishizaka	Tokyo Horse Racing	2:00.5
2012	Asuka Kurichan	5	Hiroyuki Uchida	Naosuke Sugai	Takeshi Ueno	2:01.1
2013	Meiner Lacrima	5	Daichi Shibata	Hiroyuki Uehara	Thoroughbred Club Ruffian	1:58.9
2014	Meisho Naruto	6	Hironobu Tanabe	Hiroshi Takeda	Yoshio Matsumoto	1:58.7
2015	Grandezza	6	Yuga Kawada	Osamu Hirata	Shadai Race Horse	1:58.2
2016	Albert Dock	4	Keita Tosaki	Naosuke Sugai	G1 Racing	1:58.4
2017	Seewind	4	Keita Tosaki	Tetsuya Kimura	Silk Racing	1:58.2
2018	Meadowlark	7	Kyosuke Maruta	Mitsuru Hashida	Katsumi Yoshida	2:00.8
2019	Mikki Swallow	5	Kazuki Kikuzawa	Takanori Kikuzawa	Mizuki Noda	1:59.6
2020	Crescendo Love	6	Hiroyuki Uchida	Toru Hayashi	Hiroo Race	2:02.5
2021	Taurus Gemini	5	Keita Tosaki	Satoru Kobiyama	Sakae Shibahara	2:02.2
2022	Echt	5	Katsuharu Tanaka	Hideyuki Mori	Yu Hirai	1:57.8
2023	Seiun Hades	4	Hideaki Miyuki	Shinsuke Hashiguchi	Shigeyuki Nishiyama	1:59.8
2024	Red Radiance	5	Keita Tosaki	Yasuo Tomomichi	Tokyo Horse Racing	1:57.9
2025	Cosmo Fliegen	5	Daichi Shibata	Yoshihiro Hatakeyama	Big Red Farm	2:00.5
2026	Ask Nice Show	5	Hironobu Tanabe	Eiji Nakadate	Toshihiro Hirosaki	1:57.9

== Earlier winners ==
- 1965 - Panasonic
- 1966 - Hyades
- 1967 - Hishi Yakushin
- 1968 - Daring Hime
- 1969 - Matsu Sedan
- 1970 - Hakusetsu
- 1971 - Josetsu
- 1972 - Suijin
- 1973 - Sanyoko
- 1974 - Mutsumi Baron
- 1975 - Noboru Toko
- 1976 - Nissho
- 1977 - Nissho Dia
- 1978 - Kamino Falcon
- 1979 - Takeno Tenjin
- 1980 - Sakura Eiryu
- 1981 - Bizen Seiryu
- 1982 - Sweet Native
- 1983 - Speedy Tiger
- 1984 - Hokuto Kimpai
- 1985 - Russian Blue
- 1986 - Sakura Toko
- 1987 - Dyna Shoot
- 1988 - Kosei
- 1989 - Valeroso
- 1990 - Idaten Turbo
- 1991 - Sea Carrier
- 1992 - Riesen Schlag
- 1993 - Twin Turbo
- 1994 - Nifty Dancer
- 1995 - Fujiyama Kenzan
- 1996 - Sakura Eiko O
- 1997 - Meiner Bridge
- 1998 - Offside Trap
- 1999 - Sunday Sarah

== See also ==
- Horse racing in Japan
- List of Japanese flat horse races
