= Fukushima Himba Stakes =

Fukushima Himba Stakes 福島牝馬ステークス
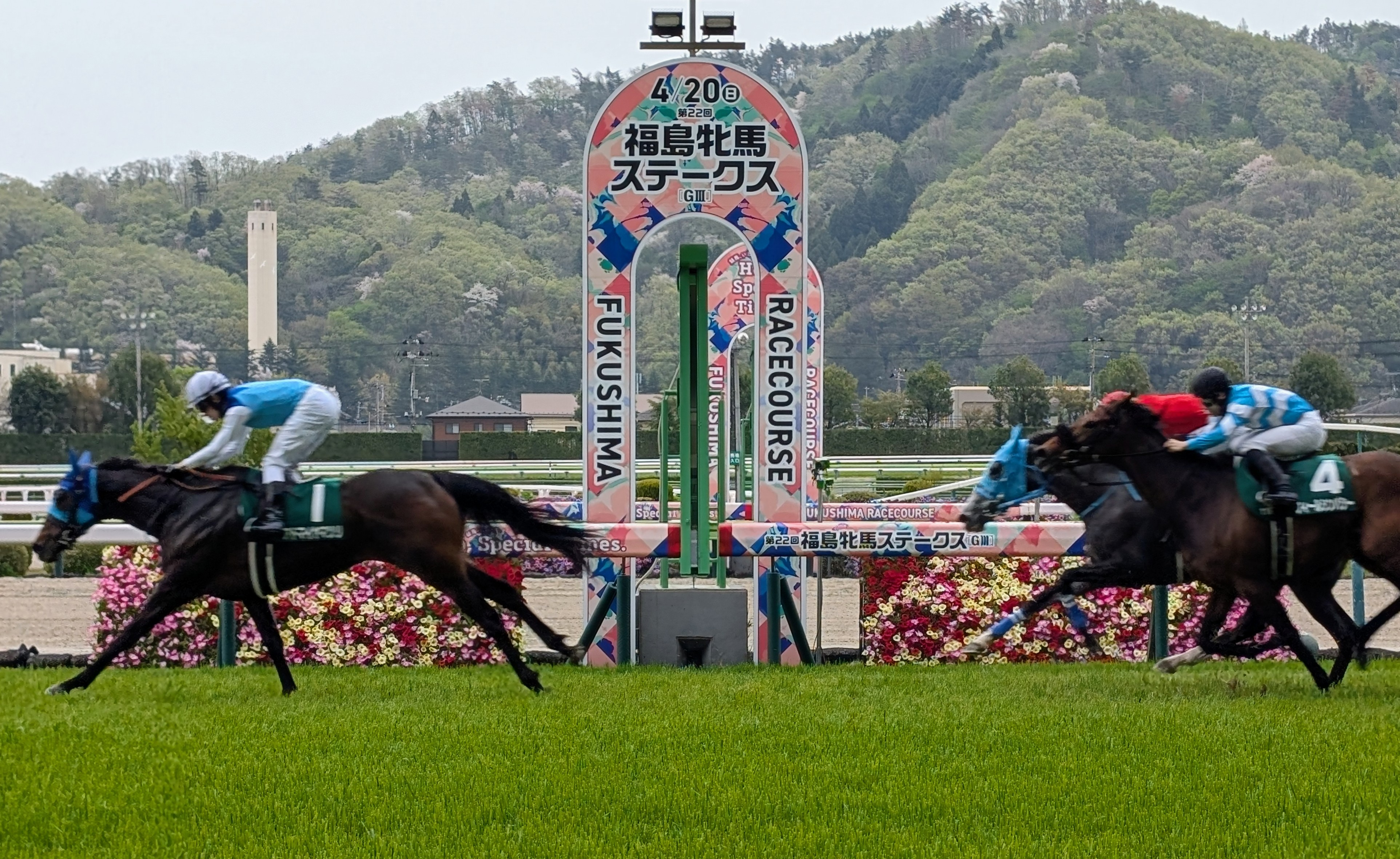
- Admire Matsuri winning the 2025 Fukushima Himba Stakes
- Class: Grade 3
- Location: Fukushima Racecourse
- Inaugurated: 2004
- Race type: Thoroughbred flat racing

Race information
- Distance: 1,800 meters
- Surface: Turf
- Track: Right-handed
- Qualification: 4-y-o+ fillies and mares
- Weight: Special Weight
- Purse: ¥ 86,400,000 (as of 2025): 1st: ¥ 40,000,000; 2nd: ¥ 16,000,000; 3rd: ¥ 10,000,000

The Fukushima Himba Stakes (Japanese 福島牝馬ステークス) is a Grade 3 horse race in Japan for Thoroughbred fillies and mares aged four and over. It is run in April over a distance of 1,800 meters on turf at Fukushima Racecourse.

The Fukushima Himba Stakes was first run in 2004 and has held Grade 3 status ever since. The race was run at Niigata Racecourse in 2011 as the racecourse was heavily damaged by the 2011 Tōhoku earthquake and tsunami. The race was once again ran in Niigata in 2021 due to the racecourse being damaged by the 2021 Fukushima earthquake.

== Race details ==
The race is run at Fukushima Racecourse over a distance of 1,800 meters on turf.

=== Weight ===
55 kg for four-year-olds and above.
Allowances:

- 1 kg for southern hemisphere bred three-year-olds

Penalties (excluding two-year-old race performance):

- If a graded stakes race has been won within a year:
  - 3 kg for a grade 1 win
  - 2 kg for a grade 2 win
  - 1 kg for a grade 3 win
- If a graded stakes race has been won for more than a year:
  - 2 kg for a grade 1 win
  - 1 kg for a grade 2 win

== Past winners ==
Year	Winner	Age	Jockey	Trainer	Owner	Time
2004	Osumi Cosmo	5	Masayoshi Ebina	Tadashi Nakao	Hidenori Yamaji	1:46.6
2005	Meisho Oscar	4	Hiroki Goto	Akio Adachi	Yoshio Matsumoto	1:49.4
2006	Lofty Aim	4	Hayato Yoshida	Yoshitaka Ninomiya	Sunday Racing	1:48.5
2007	Spring Drew	7	Yuichi Shibayama	Noriyuki Hori	Haruo Kato	1:46.6
2008	Meine Canna	4	Hayato Yoshida	Sakae Kunieda	Thoroughbred Club Ruffian	1:47.1
2009	Bravo Daisy	4	Kenichi Syono	Hidetada Otonashi	Takao Matsuoka	1:53.7
2010	Reginetta	5	Eiji Nakadate	Hidekazu Asami	Shadai Race Horse	1:48.9
2011 (Note: The race took place at Niigata Racecourse)	Fumino Imagine	5	Keisuke Dazai	Masaru Honda	Tsuzuki Tani	1:45.4
2012	All That Jazz	4	Yusuke Fujioka	Katsuhiko Sumii	Yoshimi Ichikawa	1:46.1
2013	All That Jazz	5	Cristian Demuro	Katsuhiko Sumii	Yoshimi Ichikawa	1:46.4
2014	Keiai Elegant	5	Yutaka Yoshida	Mitsuhiro Ogata	Kazuhiro Kameda	1:47.0
2015	Sweet Salsa	5	Katsuharu Tanaka	Masatatsu Kikukawa	Symboli Stud	1:46.0
2016	Makoto Brillar	6	Yuichi Kitamura	Ippo Sameshima	Diamant	1:47.5
2017	Ukiyono Kaze	7	Hayato Yoshida	Takanori Kikuzawa	Jun Kokubu	1:46.8
2018	Kinsho Yukihime	5	Shinichiro Akiyama	Hitoshi Nakamura	Hideo Isono	1:46.8
2019	Denko Ange	6	Yoshitomi Shibata	Yoshiyuki Arakawa	Yasuhiro Tanaka	1:48.1
2020	Fairy Polka	4	Ryuji Wada	Masayuki Nishimura	Takeshi Yamamoto	1:46.8
2021	Dirndl	5	Taisei Danno	Yutaka Okumura	Silk Racing	1:46.9
2022	Another Lyric	4	Akihide Tsumura	Toru Hayashi	Silk Racing	1:47.0
2023	Stellaria	5	Taisei Danno	Takashi Saito	Shadai Race Horse	1:47.9
2024	Costa Bonita	5	Mirai Iwata	Yoshiaki Sugiyama	Tatsuo Tanigake	1:46.9
2025	Admire Matsuri	4	Hironobu Tanabe	Keisuke Miyata	Junko Kondo	1:46.2
2026	Koganeno Sora	5	Kazuki Kikuzawa	Takanori Kikuzawa	Big Red Farm	1:45.6

== See also ==
- Horse racing in Japan
- List of Japanese flat horse races
