= Nakayama Kimpai =

Nakayama Kimpai 中山金杯
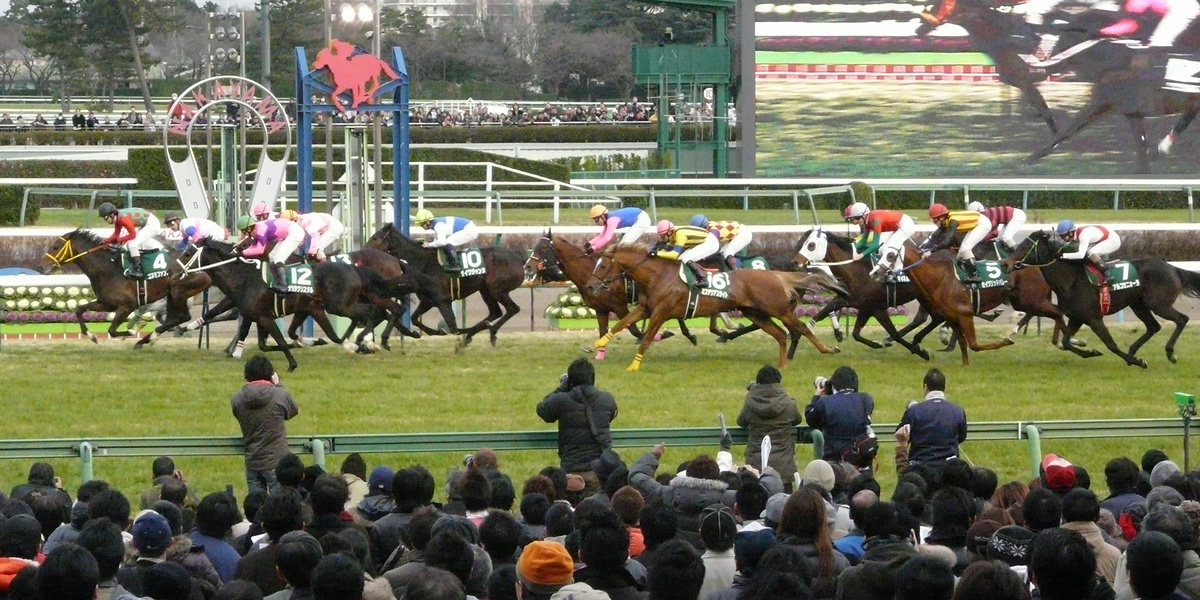
- 2011 Nakayama Kimpai
- Class: Grade 3
- Location: Nakayama Racecourse
- Inaugurated: January 20, 1952
- Race type: Thoroughbred Flat racing

Race information
- Distance: 2000 metres
- Surface: Turf
- Track: Right-handed
- Qualification: 4-y-o +
- Weight: Handicap
- Purse: ¥ 92,980,000 (as of 2025): 1st: ¥ 43,000,000; 2nd: ¥ 17,000,000; 3rd: ¥ 11,000,000

The Nakayama Kimpai (中山金杯) is a Grade 3 (GIII) flat horse race in Japan.

== Background ==
The Nakayama Kimpai is a Grade III Thoroughbred handicap race in Japan, open to horses aged four years and older. It is held annually on January 5 (or the nearest available date) at Nakayama Racecourse over a distance of 2,000 meters on turf (inner course). Eligible entrants must have raced at least once and cannot be unraced or maiden horses. The field includes JRA-trained horses, up to two certified NAR (local) horses, and foreign-trained horses with priority entry. As a handicap race, weights are assigned based on each horse's past performance to ensure competitive balance. The first-place prize in 2026 is ¥43 million.

The race is officially titled the “Nikkan Sports Sho Nakayama Kimpai”, sponsored by Nikkan Sports newspaper (Tokyo headquarters), and the winner receives the Nikkan Sports Newspaper Prize.

== History ==
The Nakayama Kimpai was first run on January 20, 1952, as the “Kin Hai” (金杯) for horses aged five and older (equivalent to four-year-olds under current standards) over 2,600 meters on turf at Nakayama Racecourse. From 1954 to 1960, it was briefly run under weight-for-age (別定) conditions, but reverted to handicap thereafter. In 1961, the race underwent a change: it swapped distance and timing with the newly created American Jockey Club Cup, shortening to 2,000 meters and moving to early January, becoming Japan's traditional opening graded stakes race of the New Year.

From 1966 to 1995, a separate “Kin Hai” was also held at Kyoto Racecourse (now the Kyoto Kimpai). To distinguish the two, the Nakayama version was officially renamed “Nikkan Sports Sho Nakayama Kimpai” in 1996. The race was designated Grade III in 1984 with the introduction of JRA's grading system. International participation expanded gradually: foreign-bred horses were allowed from 1994, foreign-trained horses from 2006 (initially 4 runners, later 8 in 2007 and 9 in 2015), and NAR horses from 2020. The venue has seen occasional changes due to external factors: it was held at Tokyo (1970–1979, 1996, 2002) and even Fukushima in 1972 due to equine influenza and labor strikes. Since 1980, however, it has been permanently set at Nakayama.

The race is affectionately known among fans by the pun: “Ichinen no kei wa Kinpai ni ari” (“The year’s plan lies in the Kimpai”), echoing the New Year proverb.

== Past winners ==
Year	Winner	Age	Length (in m)	Jockey	Trainer	Owner	Time
1952	Sachifusa	4	T2600	Takegoro Ebina	Tomiyoshi Fujimoto	Tohoku Farm Co. Ltd.	2:46.2
1953	Asatomo	4	T2600	Ryoji Furuyama	Yoichiro Mochizuki	Eiichi Tezuka	2:47.2
1954	Gaisei	4	T2600	Takayoshi Yasuda	Tokichi Ogata	Toshiaki Iwasaki	2:53.4
1955	Hakuryu	5	T2600	Takayoshi Yasuda	Tokichi Ogata	Hiroshi Nishi	2:45.2
1956	Kuri Chikara	6	T2600	Hiroaki Moriyasu	Tokichi Ogata	Tomoji Kuribayashi	2:57.2
1957	Homa Lemon	4	T2600	Isao Yamamoto	Tokichi Ogata	Masaichi Nagata	2:44.1
1958	Onward There	4	T2600	Yoshio Nohira	Toshio Nihonyanagi	Junzo Kashiyama	2:53.4
1959	Tosa O	4	T2600	Yuji Nohira	Kichisaburo Matsuyama	Gizo Mizomoto	2:47.3
1960	Kane Chikara	4	T2600	Hiroaki Moriyasu	Shotaro Abe	Yoshiaki Kanesashi	2:48.1
1961	Yamanin More	4	T2000	Katsuhiko Fujimoto	Tomiyoshi Fujimoto	Koji Doi	2:05.8
1962	Onslaught	4	T2000	Yamaoka Ken	Hiroshi Nakamura	Masashi Araki	2:03.3
1963	Kanetsu Seki	4	T2000	Takeo Ito	Kinzo Kubota	Masaki Shimizu	2:03.4
1964	Toast	5	T2000	Takayoshi Yasuda	Ogata Fujiyoshi	Masaichi Nagata	2:04.1
1965	Asahoko	5	T2000	Takemi Kaga	Tomiyoshi Fujimoto	Eiichi Tezuka	2:04.2
1966	Yamadori	5	T2000	Hiroaki Moriyasu	Morisuenosuke	Yutaro Shimizu	2:03.8
1967	Higashi Thonella O	5	T2000	Takeo Ito	Kinzo Kubota	Seigoro Sakamoto	2:06.1
1968	Onward Hill	5	T2000	Mitsuo Makino	Hiroshi Nakamura	Junzo Kashiyama	2:04.8
1969	Hakusetsu	4	T2000	Yukio Okabe	Hideo Takahashi	Katsugoro Nakamura	2:04.4
1970	Sweet Flag	6	T2000	Yuji Nohira	Shozo Nohira	Tomohiro Wada	2:03.8
1971	Kojo	5	D2100	Masato Yoshinaga	Kichisaburo Matsuyama	Morihiro Sato	2:12.0
1972	Koyo	4	T2000	Masao Kawakami	Takeichi Kawakami	Kinji Sato	2:01.6
1973	Kuri Iwai	4	T2000	Hiroyuki Gohara	Katsuyuki Okubo	Tomoji Kuribayashi	2:04.8
1974	Ina Boreas	5	T2000	Jin Miyata	Sueyoshi Okubo	Takato Inatomi	2:01.4
1975	Western Dash	4	T2000	Masanori Ito	Ogata Fujiyoshi	Nishikawa Shoji Co. Ltd.	2:03.1
1976	Eyeful	5	T2000	Yasuo Sugawara	Yoshio Nakazumi	Yoshiaki Fujimoto	2:03.1
1977	Harbor Young	5	T2000	Yukio Okabe	Hideo Inaba	Harbor Co. Ltd.	2:02.0
1978	Shimano Katsuharu	5	D2100	Futoshi Kojima	Ryoji Furuyama	Katsuji Takahashi	2:09.7
1979	C.B. Cross	4	T2000	Masato Yoshinaga	Kichisaburo Matsuyama	Chigira Bokujo	2:00.6
1980	Yoshinosky	4	T2000	Hitoshi Matoba	Seisuke Sato	Misako Yoshizawa	2:08.4
1981	Droppo Lord	4	T2000	Eiji Nakano	Shizuo Araki	Shuzo Takimura	2:02.0
1982	Eighty Tosho	4	T2000	Hiroyuki Nakajima	Shinji Okudaira	Tosho Sangyo Co. Ltd.	2:04.4
1983	Yorozu Happiness	4	T2000	Masanori Ito	Mitsuhiro Ogata	IKT Owners Co. Ltd.	2:02.2
1984	Dokan Yashima	4	T2000	Eizaburo Otsuka	Tojiro Tanaka	Arai Kogyo Co. Ltd.	2:01.8
1985	Suzu Parade	4	T2000	Masamitsu Tamura	Rokuro Tomita	Yoshio Komurasaki	2:00.4
1986	Kushiro King	4	T2000	Yukio Okabe	Takayoshi Nakano	Akira Abe	2:01.6
1987	Tochino Nishiki	5	T2000	Seiji Ebiwawa	Hironori Kurita	Mitsuo Soutome	2:02.6
1988	Iron Ciro	6	T2000	Hayato Minata	Suenosuke Mori	Masayuki Nishiyama	2:01.9
1989	Nishino Mirror	5	T2000	Yoshinori Muto	Masahiro Sato	Masayuki Nishiyama	2:00.7
1990	Mejiro Monterey	4	T2000	Norihiro Yokoyama	Shinji Okudaira	Mejiro Farm Ltd.	2:00.4
1991	Carib Song	5	T2000	Masato Shibata	Shuho Kato	Ogibushi Ranch Racing Club Co. Ltd.	2:00.4
1992	Tosho Falco	6	T2000	Masato Shibata	Shinsekiryoku	Tosho Sangyo Co. Ltd.	1:59.6
1993	Sekitai Ryu O	4	T2000	Katsuharu Tanaka	Toshifumi Fujiwara	Shingen Tourism Co. Ltd.	2:00.5
1994	Hidaka Hayato	7	T2000	Eizaburo Otsuka	Hiroaki Moriyasu	Seiho Shokusan Co. Ltd.	2:00.7
1995	Sakura Laurel	4	T2000	Futoshi Kojima	Katsutaro Sakai	Shoretsu Zen	2:00.5
1996	Best Tie Up	4	T2000	Norihiro Yokoyama	Yasuhisa Matsuyama	Teruya Yoshida	1:59.3
1997	Best Tie Up	5	T2000	Yukio Okabe	Yasuhisa Matsuyama	Teruya Yoshida	2:01.5
1998	Gourmet Frontier	6	T2000	Yukio Okabe	Kiyotaka Tanaka	Masayoshi Ishii	2:01.4
1999	Silent Hunter	6	T2000	Yutaka Yoshida	Yokichi Okubo	Hiroyoshi Usuda	2:00.8
2000	Jo Big Bang	5	T2000	Kazuhiro Yamada	Masanao Tsubo	Keiko Ueda	2:01.4
2001	Charisma Sun Opera	4	T2000	Eiji Nakadate	Hiroki Sakiyama	Toshiyuki Kuroyanagi	2:01.2
2002	Big Gold	4	T2000	Yoshitomi Shibata	Tadashi Nakao	Big Co. Ltd.	1:59.0
2003	Toho Shiden	6	T2000	Katsuharu Tanaka	Kiyotaka Tanaka	Toho Bussan Co. Ltd.	2:00.0
2004	Asaka Defeat	6	T2000	Eiji Nakadate	Akio Tsurudome	Yoshio Asakawa	1:59.2
2005	Craft Work	5	T2000	Norihiro Yokoyama	Yohiyuki Goto	Sunday Racing Ltd.	1:59.0
2006	Vita Rosa	6	T2000	Yuichi Shibayama	Kojiro Hahiguchi	Sunday Racing Ltd.	1:59.4
2007	Shadow Gate	5	T2000	Katsuharu Tanaka	Yukihiro Kato	Tomokazu Iizuka	2:02.4
2008	Admire Fuji	6	T2000	Yuga Kawada	Mitsuru Hashida	Riichi Kondo	2:00.7
2009	Admire Fuji	7	T2000	Yuga Kawada	Mitsuru Hashida	Riichi Kondo	1:58.5
2010	Axion	7	T2000	Shinji Fujita	Yohitaka Ninomiya	Tohru Nakata	2:00.8
2011	Cosmo Phantom	4	T2000	Masami Matsuoka	Toru Miya	Big Red Farm Ltd.	1:59.8
2012	Federalist	5	T2000	Masayoshi Ebina	Tsuyoshi Tanaka	Shadai Race Horse Ltd.	1:59.4
2013	Touch Me Not	7	T2000	Norihiro Yokoyama	Isamu Shibasaki	Teruya Yoshida	1:59.8
2014	Ocean Blue	6	T2000	Fran Berry	Yasutoshi Ikee	Aoshiba Shoji Co. Ltd.	2:00.1
2015	Lovely Day	5	T2000	Fran Berry	Yasutoshi Ikee	Kaneko Masato Holdings Co. Ltd.	1:57.8
2016	Yamakatsu Ace	4	T2000	Kenichi Ikezoe	Kaneo Ikezoe	Kazuo Yamada	2:01.2
2017	Tsukuba Azuma O	6	T2000	Yutaka Yoshida	Mitsuhiro Ogata	Shoji Hagiwara	2:00.6
2018	Seda Brillantes	4	T2000	Keita Tosaki	Takahisa Tezuka	Silk Racing Ltd.	1:59.8
2019	Win Bright	5	T2000	Masami Matsuoka	Yoshihiro Hatakeyama	Win Co. Ltd.	1:59.2
2020	Triomphe	6	T2000	Mirco Demuro	Naosuke Sugai	Kuwata Farm Co. Ltd.	1:59.5
2021	Hishi Iguazu	5	T2000	Kohei Matsuyama	Noriyuki Hori	Masahide Abe	2:00.9
2022	Red Galant	7	T2000	Arata Saito	Takayuki Yasuda	Tokyo Horse Racing Co. Ltd.	2:00.1
2023	Lagulf	4	T2000	Keita Tosaki	Yoshitada Munakata	Takashi Muraki	2:00.2
2024	Licancabur	5	T2000	Akihide Tsumura	Katsunori Tanaka	La Mer Co. Ltd.	1:58.9
2025	Al Naseem	6	T2000	Yusuke Fujioka	Shinsuke Hashiguchi	Lion Race Horse Co. Ltd.	1:58.1
2026	Kalamatianos	4	T2000	Akihide Tsumura	Takeshi Okumura	Sunday Racing Co. Ltd.	2:00.3

== See also ==
- Horse racing in Japan
- List of Japanese flat horse races

=== Netkeiba ===
- 1956 en, 1957 en, 1958 en, 1959 en, 1960 en, 1961 en, 1962 en, 1963 en, 1964 en, 1965 en, 1966 en, 1967 en, 1968 en, 1969 en, 1970 en, 1971 en, 1972 en, 1973 en, 1974 en, 1975 en, 1976 en, 1977 en, 1978 en, 1979 en, 1980 en, 1981 en, 1982 en, 1983 en, 1984 en, 1985 en, 1986 en, 1987 en, 1988 en, 1989 en, 1990 en, 1991 en, 1992 en, 1993 en, 1994 en, 1995 en, 1996 en, 1997 en, 1998 en, 1999 en, 2000 en, 2001 en, 2002 en, 2003 en, 2004 en, 2005 en, 2006 en, 2007 en, 2008 en, 2009 en, 2010 en, 2011 en, 2012 en, 2013 en, 2014 en, 2015 en, 2016 en, 2017 en, 2018 en, 2019 en, 2020 en, 2021 en, 2022 en, 2023 en, 2024 en, 2025 en, 2026 en
