= Radio Nikkei Sho =

Radio Nikkei Sho ラジオNIKKEI賞
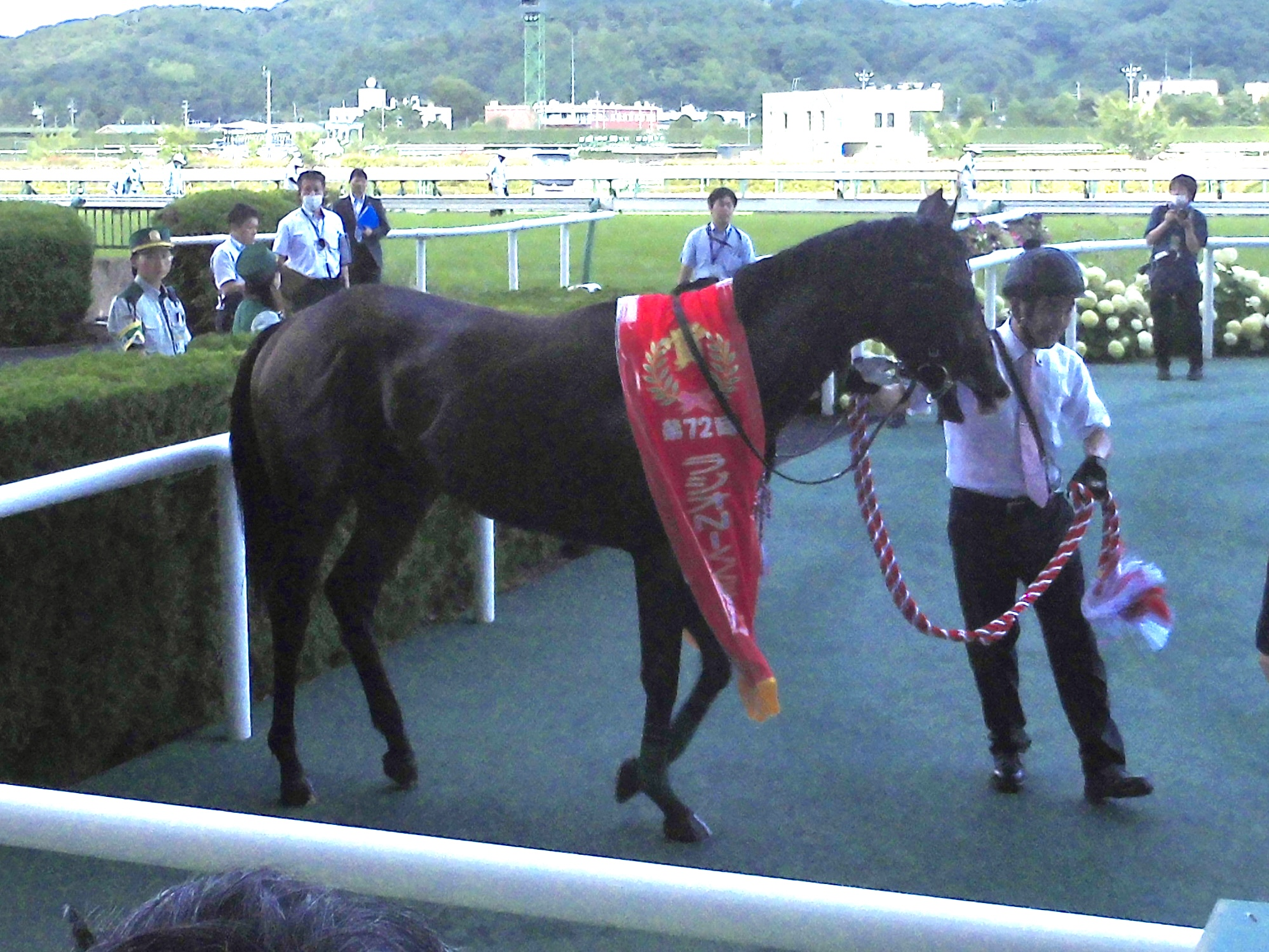
- 2023 Radio Nikkei Sho winner, Elton Barrows, in the winner's circle
- Class: Grade 3
- Location: Fukushima Racecourse
- Inaugurated: 1952
- Race type: Thoroughbred Flat racing

Race information
- Distance: 1800 metres
- Surface: Turf
- Track: Right-handed
- Qualification: 3-y-o
- Weight: Handicap
- Purse: ¥ 87,960,000 (as of 2025): 1st: ¥ 41,000,000; 2nd: ¥ 16,000,000; 3rd: ¥ 10,000,000

The Radio Nikkei Sho (Japanese ラジオNIKKEI賞) is a Grade 3 horse race for three-year-old Thoroughbreds in Japan run in late June or early July over a distance of 1800 metres at Fukushima Racecourse.

The race was first run in 1952 and was promoted to Grade 3 status in 1984. The race was run at Tokyo Racecourse and Nakayama Racecourse before moving to its current venue in 1979. It was run at Niigata Racecourse in 1989, Tokyo in 2000 and Nakayama in 2011.

== Winners since 2000 ==
Year	Winner	Jockey	Trainer	Owner	Time
2000	Renaissance^{[a]}	Naohiro Onishi	Yutaka Takahashi	Yukiyoshi Nakazawa	1:49.4
2001	Trust Fire	Katsuharu Tanaka	Michifumi Kono	Mitsuru Suganami	1:49.4
2002	Kattsu Mi	Hiroyuki Uchida	Masaaki Minamida	Shigeo Abe	1:48.3
2003	Vita Rosa	Masayoshi Ebina	Kojiro Hashiguchi	Sunday Racing Co. Ltd.	1:48.4
2004	Keiai Guard	Mikio Matsunaga	Taira Furakawa	Morihiro Kameda	1:47.1
2005	Conrad	Norihiro Yokoyama	Takahisa Tezuka	Sunday Racing Co. Ltd.	1:47.2
2006	Tamamo Support	Akihide Tsumura	Kenichi Fujioka	Tamamo Co. Ltd.	1:50.5
2007	Roc de Cambes	Yuichi Shibayama	Noriyuki Hori	Kazumi Yoshida	1:47.7
2008	Leo Meister	Hiroyuki Uchida	Masaaki Koga	Leo Co. Ltd.	1:46.8
2009	Strong Garuda	Masayoshi Ebina	Takashi Kubota	Atsushi Muraki	1:48.3
2010	Aroma Cafe	Yoshitomi Shibata	Futoshi Kojima	Koichi Nishikawa	1:47.3
2011	Frere Jacques ^{[b]}	Yuichi Fukunaga	Yasuo Tomomichi	Carrot Farm Co. Ltd.	1:46.9
2012	Final Form	Keita Tosaki	Noriyuki Hori	Shadai Race Horse Co. Ltd.	1:47.9
2013	K I Chosan	Norihiro Yokoyama	Michihiro Ogasa	Chosan Co. Ltd.	1:47.9
2014	Win Malerei	Masami Matsuoka	Noboru Takagi	Win Co. Ltd.	1:45.9
2015	Ambitious	Christophe Lemaire	Hidetaka Otonashi	Hideko Kondo	1:46.4
2016	Seewind	Keita Tosaki	Tetsuya Kimura	Silk Racing Co. Ltd.	1:47.0
2017	Seda Brillantes	Yukito Ishikawa	Takahisa Tezuka	Silk Racing Co. Ltd.	1:46.6
2018	Meisho Tekkon	Kohei Matsuyama	Yoshitada Takahashi	Yoshio Matsumoto	1:46.1
2019	Breaking Dawn	Hironobu Tanabe	Kazuya Nakatake	Koki Maeda	1:49.8
2020	Babbitt	Hiroyuki Uchida	Tamio Hamada	Naoya Miyata	1:47.3
2021	Weiss Meteor	Genki Maruyama	Tetsuya Kimura	Silk Racing Co. Ltd.	1:48.0
2022	Feengrotten	Fuma Matsuwaka	Hiroshi Miyamoto	Sunday Racing Co. Ltd.	1:46.7
2023	Elton Barows	Atsuya Nishimura	Haruki Sugiyama	Hirotsugu Inokuma	1:46.9
2024	Off Trail	Hironobu Tanabe	Keiji Yoshimura	Godolphin	1:45.3
2025	Excite Bio	Kiwamu Ogino	Teiichi Konno	Bio K.	1:46.9
2026	Sanono Greater	Hironobu Tanabe	Kazuyuki Ogata	Nobuyuki Sano	1:45.2

^{a} The 2000 race took place at Tokyo
^{b} The 2011 race took place at Nakayama

== Earlier winners ==
- 1952 - Asatomo
- 1953 - Cheerio
- 1954 - Golden Wave
- 1955 - Hide Homare
- 1956 - Fair Manna
- 1957 - Onward There
- 1958 - Katsutoshi
- 1959 - Shigeminoru
- 1960 - Big Yoruka
- 1961 - Azuma Tenran
- 1962 - Suzu Hope
- 1963 - Kaneno Hikaru
- 1964 - Flower Wood
- 1965 - Verona
- 1966 - Hiro Isami
- 1967 - Munehisa
- 1968 - Asaka O
- 1969 - Haku Eiho
- 1970 - Higashi Light
- 1971 - Mineral Symboli
- 1972 - Sugano Homare
- 1973 - Ichifuji Isami
- 1974 - Suruga Sumpujo
- 1975 - Hakuchi Chikatsu
- 1976 - Toridejo
- 1977 - Maruzensky
- 1978 - Kitano Kongo
- 1979 - Hokusei Midori
- 1980 - Hawaiian Image
- 1981 - Eighty Tosho
- 1982 - Aki Bingo
- 1983 - Umeno Shin O
- 1984 - Suzu Parade
- 1985 - Derby Rich
- 1986 - Dyna Cosmos
- 1987 - Leo Tenzan
- 1988 - Takara Flash
- 1989 - Daiwa Gehrig
- 1990 - Tsurumai Aswan
- 1991 - Twin Turbo
- 1992 - Shinko Lovely
- 1993 - A P Grand Prix
- 1994 - Yashima Sovereign
- 1995 - Prest Symboli
- 1996 - Big Baillamont
- 1997 - Air Guts
- 1998 - Biwa Takehide
- 1999 - Silk Guardian

== See also ==
- Horse racing in Japan
- List of Japanese flat horse races
