= Fukushima Racecourse =

Horse Racing course in Fukushima, Japan

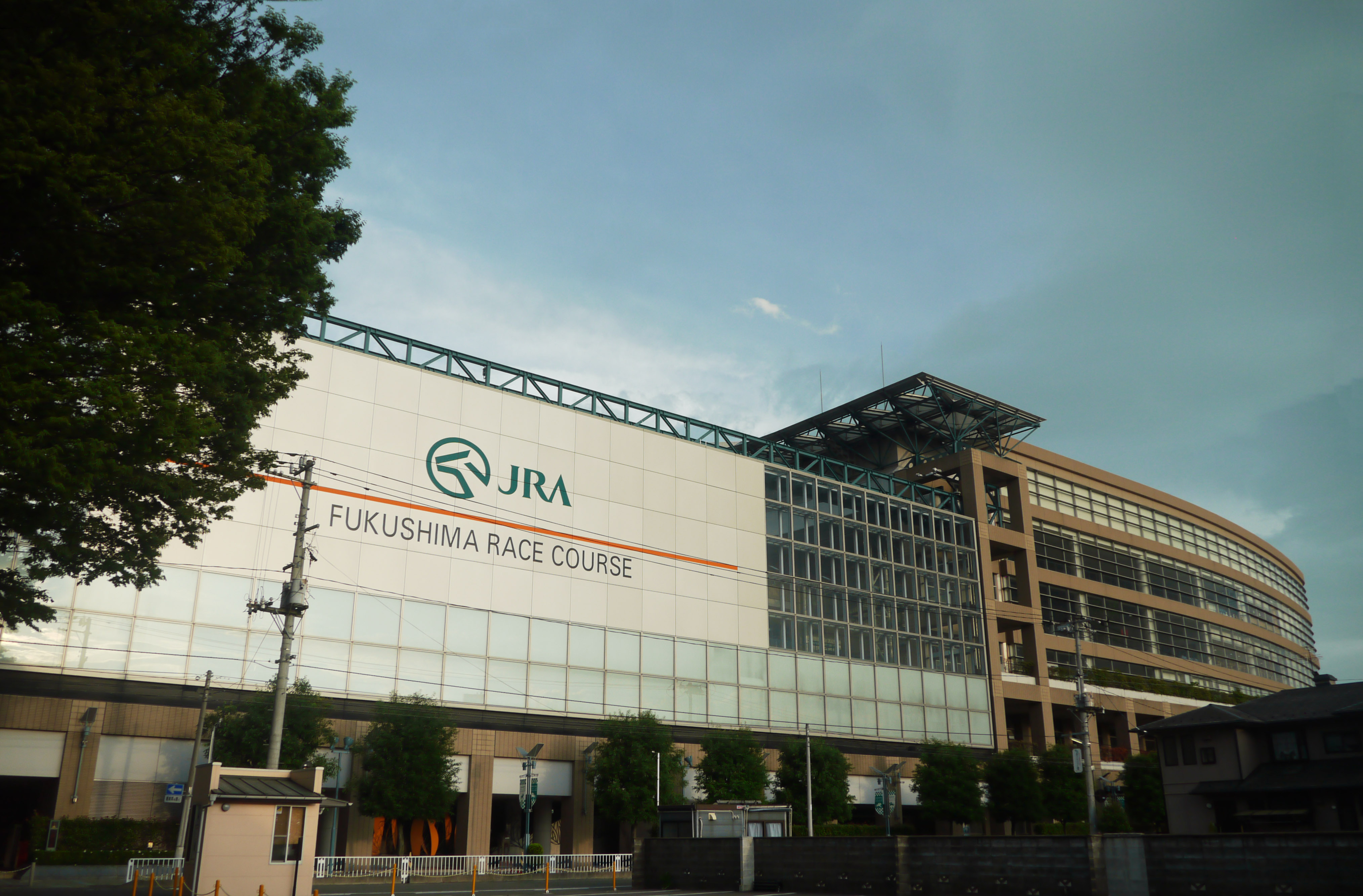
- Interactive map of Fukushima Racecourse
- Location: 9-23, Matsunami-chō; Fukushima, Fukushima, Japan
- Coordinates: 37°45′52.4″N 140°28′57.1″E
- Owned by: Japan Racing Association
- Date opened: 1918
- Race type: Thoroughbred - Flat racing
- Course type: Grass, Dirt

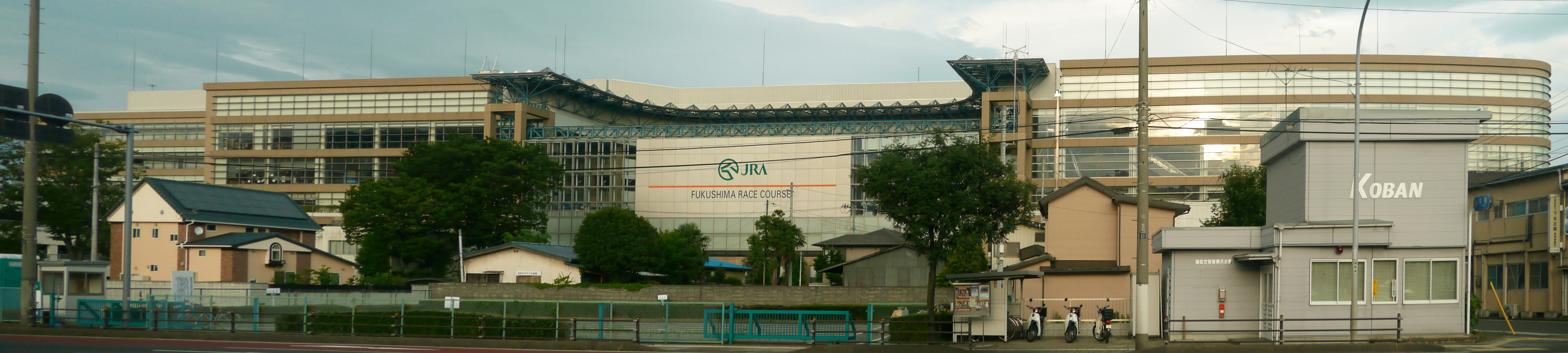
Fukushima Racecourse as seen from Japan National Route 4

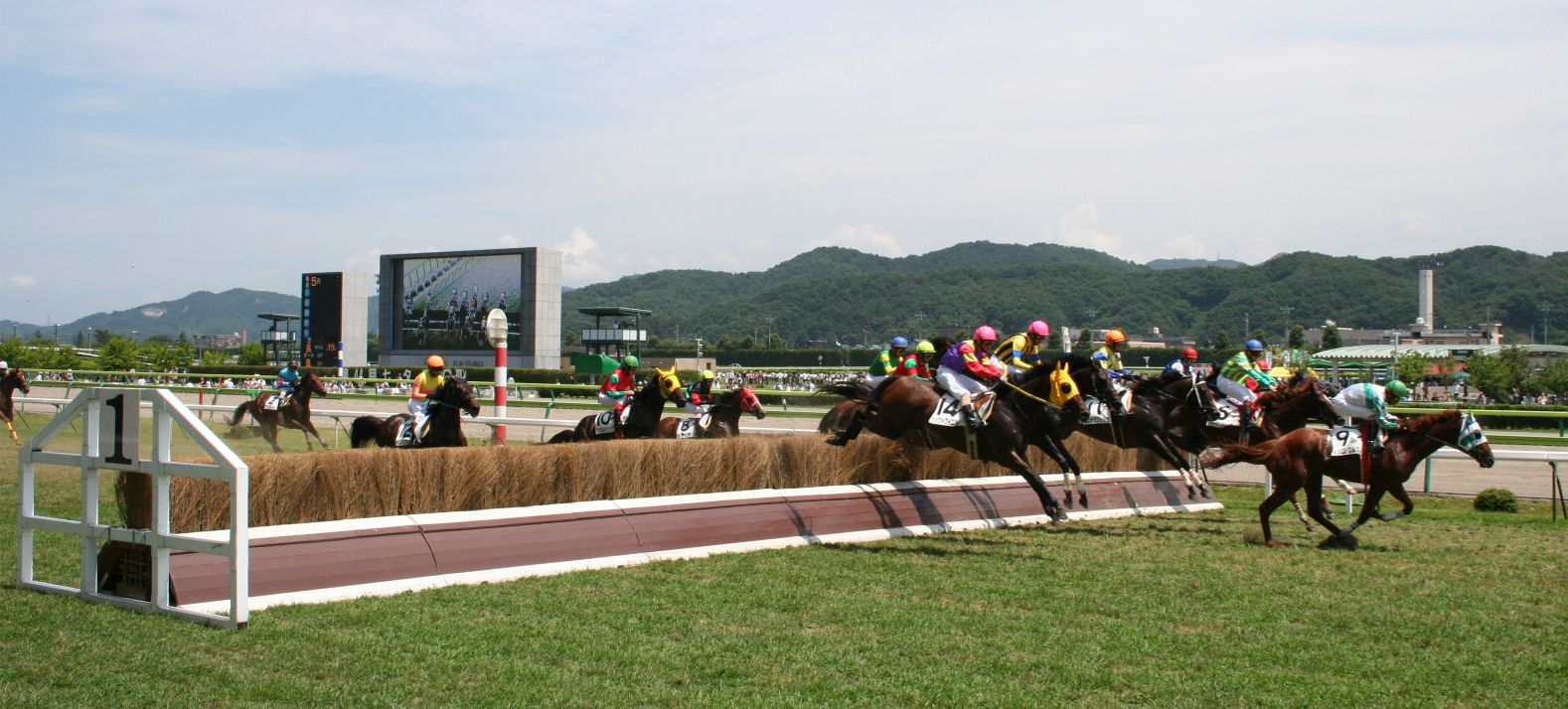
Racers jumping over hurdle #1

Fukushima Racecourse (福島競馬場, Fukushima keibajō) is a horse racing course located in Fukushima, Fukushima, Japan. It was built in 1918.

== Courses ==
Fukushima Racecourse has both a turf and a dirt course. It is the smallest racecourse that holds Japan Racing Association races.

The turf course measures 1600m. Races can be run on the "A Course" rail setting (on the hedge), the "B Course" setting (rail out 2 meters), or the "C Course" setting (rail out 4 meters).

The dirt course measures 1444.6 meters.

== Notable races ==
| Month | Race | Distance | Age/Sex |
Grade III
| Apr. | Fukushima Himba Stakes (Victoria Mile Trial) | Turf 1800m | 4yo + f |
| Jul. | Radio Nikkei Sho (Handicap) | Turf 1800m | 3yo |
| Jul. | Tanabata Sho (Handicap) | Turf 2000m | 3yo + |
| Nov. | Fukushima Kinen (Handicap) | Turf 2000m | 3yo + |

== Track records ==
Source：レコードタイム表 (Record time table) -> 福島競馬場 (Fukushima Racecourse)

- † Reference Time.
- Last updated on June 20, 2026.

=== Turf course (2yo) ===
| Distance | Time | Racehorse | Sex | Weight | Jockey | Date Recorded |
|---|---|---|---|---|---|---|
| 1000m | 57.1 | Cosmo Youkorin | Filly | 54kg | Hayato Yoshida | June 21, 2008 |
| 1200m | 1:08.4 | G T Maika | Filly | 55kg | Kohei Matsuyama | June 28, 2026 |
| 1700m | 1:41.5 | Condor Quest | Colt | 55kg | Hiroshi Kitamura | October 25, 2003 |
| 1800m | 1:46.2 | Meiner Surpass | Colt | 55kg | Yuji Tannai | November 4, 2018 |
| 2000m | 1:59.9 | Tarte aux Pommes | Colt | 54kg | Kazuo Yokoyama | November 16, 2013 |

=== Turf course (3yo+) ===
| Distance | Time | Racehorse | Sex | Weight | Jockey | Date Recorded |
|---|---|---|---|---|---|---|
| 1000m | 56.7 | Brightia Leaf | Filly 3 | 50kg | Takahiro Nozaki | July 15, 2000 |
| 1200m | 1:07.0 | Silky Lagoon | Mare 5 | 54kg | Katsuharu Tanaka | June 19, 2005 |
| 1700m | 1:40.4 | Spark Tosho | Mare 5 | 55kg | Yutaka Yoshida | July 4, 1998 |
| 1800m | 1:45.2 | Sanono Greater | Colt 3 | 56kg | Hironobu Tanabe | June 28, 2026 |
| 2000m | 1:56.7 | Maglia Iridata | Mare 4 | 56kg | Ryusei Sakai | June 27, 2026 |
| 2600m | 2:37.3 | Success Pursuit | Colt 4 | 57kg | Hayato Yoshida | November 3, 2012 |

=== Dirt course (2yo) ===
| Distance | Time | Racehorse | Sex | Weight | Jockey | Date Recorded |
|---|---|---|---|---|---|---|
| 1000m | 59.1 | Vegaskaranotegami | Colt | 53kg | Takanori Kikuzawa | October 25, 1997 |
| 1150m | 1:07.4 | Nishino Mizukaze | Filly | 54kg | Hironobu Tanabe | July 12, 2020 |
| 1700m | 1:45.1 | Kotohodo Sayoni | Colt | 56kg | Yoshimasa Kido | November 18, 2023 |

=== Dirt course (3yo+) ===
| Distance | Time | Racehorse | Sex | Weight | Jockey | Date Recorded |
|---|---|---|---|---|---|---|
| 1000m | 58.0 | Oath no Musume | Filly 3 | 50kg | Hiroto Mayuzumi | October 20, 2007 |
| 1150m | 1:06.0 | American Ticket | Gelding 5 | 58kg | Ryoya Kozaki | June 27, 2026 |
| 1700m | 1:42.6 | World Tachyon | Horse 5 | 58kg | Yamato Tsunoda | November 19, 2023 |
| 2400m | 2:30.2 | Sun Athletic | Gelding 4 | 56kg | Hayato Matoba | April 20, 2008 |
